= 2022–23 Galatasaray S.K. season =

Galatasaray
2022–23 season
- President: Dursun Özbek
- Head coach: Okan Buruk
- Stadium: Nef Stadium
- Süper Lig: 1st
- Turkish Cup: Quarter-finals
- Top goalscorer: League: Mauro Icardi (22); All: Mauro Icardi (23)
- Highest home attendance: 51,005 vs Fenerbahçe (Süper Lig, 4 June 2023)
- Lowest home attendance: 21,981 vs Kastamonuspor 1966 (Turkish Cup, 19 October 2022)
- Average home league attendance: 45,516
- Biggest win: 7–0 (vs. Kastamonuspor 1966 (H), 19 October 2022, Turkish Cup); 0–7 (vs. İstanbul Başakşehir (A), 12 November 2022, Süper Lig)
- Biggest defeat: 3–1 (vs. Beşiktaş (A), 30 April 2023, Süper Lig)
Home colours	Away colours	Third colours

The 2022–23 season was the 118th season in the existence of Galatasaray and the club's 65th consecutive season in the top flight of Turkish football. In addition to the domestic league, Galatasaray participated in this season's edition of the Turkish Cup.

== Overview ==
=== June ===
On 11 June 2022, Dursun Özbek has been elected as the new club chairman. This has been the second Özbek era in Galatasaray history.

On 20 June 2022, the contract of Galatasaray Football Team Sporting Director Pasquale Sensibile was terminated.

Cenk Ergün was appointed as the Football Director of Galatasaray Sports Club on 20 June 2022.

As of 21 June 2022, the contracts of Coach Domènec Torrent and his assistants Jordi Gris Vila, Jordi Guerrero Costa, Julián Jiménez Serrano and Ricard Segarra Aragay have been terminated.

On 23 June 2022, Okan Buruk was appointed as the Football Team Coach.

On 27 June 2022, Galatasaray performed the first training of the 2022–23 season at Florya Metin Oktay Facilities under the management of Coach Okan Buruk.

On 28 June 2022, Albert Riera, who was an assistant coach, left his job.

=== October ===
On 24 October 2022, the new assistant coach of the yellow-reds, Moritz Volz also took part in the training.

=== November ===
In the notification made on 28 November 2022, it was announced that the Galatasaray Football Team will camp in Antalya between 8–16 December in the interim given to the Süper Lig due to the World Cup.

== Club ==
=== Board of directors ===
Position	Staff
President	(Turkey) Dursun Özbek
Second President	(Turkey) Metin Öztürk
Vice President	(Turkey) Niyazi Yelkencioğlu
Vice President	(Turkey) Ahmet Cemal Özgörkey
General Secretary	(Turkey) Eray Yazgan
Accounting Member	(Turkey) Levent Yaz
Board Spokesperson	(Turkey) Rıza Tevfik Morova
Board Member	(Turkey) Bora İsmail Bahçetepe
Board Member	(Turkey) Mehmet İsmail Sarıkaya
Board Member	(Turkey) Mehmet Saruhan Cibara
Board Member	(Turkey) Dikran Gülmezgil
Board Member	(Turkey) Can Natan
Board Member	(Turkey) Emir Aral
Board Member	(Turkey) Cansu Ak Yılmaz
Board Member	(Turkey) Tanur Lara Yılmaz
Board Member	(Turkey) Cem Soylu

Last updated: 8 June 2023
Source: Galatasaray.org, Galatasaray.org

=== Sportif AŞ Board of directors ===
Position	Staff
Chairman of the Board	(Turkey) Dursun Özbek
Vice President	(Turkey) Erden Timur
Board Member	(Turkey) Metin Öztürk
Board Member	(Turkey) Niyazi Yelkencioğlu
Board Member	(Turkey) Eray Yazgan
Board Member	(Turkey) Can Natan
Board Member	(Turkey) İbrahim Hatipoğlu
Board Member	(Turkey) Mustafa Aktaş
Independent Board Member	(Turkey) Maruf Güneş
Independent Board Member	(Turkey) Nihat Kırmızı
Independent Board Member	(Turkey) Fatih Süleyman Demircan
Independent Board Member	(Turkey) Emin İmanov

Last updated: 8 June 2023
Source: Galatasaray.org

=== Facilities ===
Position	Staff
Stadium	(Turkey) Nef Stadium
Sports Complex	(Turkey) Ali Sami Yen Sports Complex
Training facility	(Turkey) Florya Metin Oktay Facilities

Last updated: 8 June 2023
Source: Galatasaray.org

== Kits ==
Galatasaray's 2022–23 kits, manufactured by Nike, released on 17 June 2022 and were up for sale on the same day.

- Supplier: Nike
- Main sponsor: Sixt
- Back sponsor: Nesine.com
- Sleeve sponsor: Tunç Holding
- Short sponsor: Ödeal
- Socks sponsor: —

Home
Away
Third
Goalkeeper 1
Goalkeeper 2
Goalkeeper 3

== Management team ==
Position	Staff
Football Director	(Turkey) Cenk Ergün
Head Coach	(Turkey) Okan Buruk
Assistant Coach	(Turkey) İrfan Saraloğlu
Assistant Coach	(Spain) Ismael García Gómez
Assistant Coach	(Germany) Moritz Volz
Goalkeeping Coach	(Turkey) Fadıl Koşutan
Goalkeeping Coach	(Turkey) Can Okuyucu
Athletic Performance Coach	(Turkey) Dursun Genç
Athletic Performance Coach	(Turkey) Kaan Arısoy
Athletic Performance Coach	(Turkey) Yusuf Köklü
Athletic Performance Coach	(Turkey) Gürkan Fuat Demir
Match and Performance Analyst	(Turkey) Yılmaz Yüksel
Match and Performance Analyst	(Turkey) Serhat Doğan
Match and Performance Analyst	(Turkey) M. Can Mutlu
Administrative Manager	(Turkey) Uğur Yıldız
Scouting and Performance Analysis Manager	(Turkey) Emre Utkucan
Research and Development Director	(Germany) (Turkey) Fatih Demireli
Doctor	(Turkey) Yener İnce
Doctor	(Turkey) Hakan Çelebi
Media and Communications Manager	(Turkey) Coşkun Gülbahar
Media Officer	(Turkey) Egehan Şengül
Interpreter	(Turkey) Ersan Zeren
Interpreter	(Turkey) Utku Yurtbil
Nutritionist	(Turkey) Mestan Hüseyin Çilekçi
Physiotherapist	(Turkey) Mustafa Korkmaz
Physiotherapist	(Turkey) Burak Koca
Physiotherapist	(Turkey) Samet Polat
Physiotherapist	(Turkey) Erkan Özyılmaz
Masseur	(Turkey) Sedat Peker
Masseur	(Turkey) Batuhan Erkan
Masseur	(Turkey) Ozan Abaylı
Masseur	(Turkey) Serdal Yılmaz
Material Manager	(Turkey) Hasan Çelik
Material Manager	(Turkey) Veli Muğlı
Material Manager	(Turkey) İlyas Gökçe

Last updated: 2 April 2023.
Source: Futbol A Takım İdari ve Teknik Kadro – GALATASARAY.ORG

== Players ==
=== Squad information ===
Players and squad numbers last updated on 5 May 2023. Appearances include all competitions.
Note: Flags indicate national team as has been defined under FIFA eligibility rules. Players may hold more than one non-FIFA nationality.

No.	Player	Nat.	Position(s)	Date of birth (age)	Signed in	Contract ends	Signed from / Last club	Transfer Fee
Goalkeepers
1	Fernando Muslera (captain)	(Uruguay)	GK	16 June 1986 (age 40)	2011	2024	(Italy) Lazio	€6,750,000 + Cana
34	Okan Kocuk	(Turkey)	GK	27 July 1995 (age 31)	2019	2023	(Turkey) Bursaspor	Free
50	Jankat Yılmaz	(Turkey)	GK	16 August 2004 (age 22)	2022	2025	Academy	Trainee
Defenders
2	Léo Dubois	(France)	RB	14 September 1994 (age 32)	2022	2025	(France) Lyon	€2,500,000
4	Mathias Ross	(Denmark)	CB	15 January 2001 (age 25)	2022	2026	(Denmark) AaB	€1,750,000
13	Emre Taşdemir	(Turkey)	LB	8 August 1995 (age 31)	2019	2023	(Turkey) Bursaspor	Free
23	Kaan Ayhan	(Turkey)	CB	10 November 1994 (age 31)	2023	2023	(Italy) Sassuolo	Loan
25	Victor Nelsson	(Denmark)	CB	14 October 1998 (age 28)	2021	2026	(Denmark) Copenhagen	€7,000,000
32	Sam Adekugbe	(Canada)	LB	16 January 1995 (age 31)	2023	2023	(Turkey) Hatayspor	Loan
40	Emin Bayram	(Turkey)	CB	2 April 2003 (age 23)	2019	2026	Academy	Trainee
42	Abdülkerim Bardakcı	(Turkey)	CB	7 September 1994 (age 32)	2022	2025	(Turkey) Konyaspor	€2,800,000
46	Gökay Güney	(Turkey)	CB	19 May 1999 (age 27)	2020	2024	Academy	Trainee
88	Kazımcan Karataş	(Turkey)	LB	16 January 2003 (age 23)	2022	2027	(Turkey) Altay	€1,150,000
93	Sacha Boey	(France)	RB	13 September 2000 (age 26)	2021	2025	(France) Rennes	Undisclosed
Midfielders
5	Lucas Torreira	(Uruguay)	DM	11 February 1996 (age 30)	2022	2026	(England) Arsenal	€6,000,000
6	Fredrik Midtsjø	(Norway)	CM	11 August 1993 (age 33)	2022	2025	(Netherlands) AZ	€3,500,000
7	Kerem Aktürkoğlu (3rd captain)	(Turkey)	LW	21 October 1998 (age 28)	2020	2026	(Turkey) 24 Erzincanspor	Free
11	Yunus Akgün	(Turkey)	RW	7 July 2000 (age 26)	2018	2026	Academy	Trainee
17	Nicolò Zaniolo	(Italy)	AM	2 July 1999 (age 27)	2023	2027	(Italy) Roma	€15,000,000
22	Berkan Kutlu	(Turkey)	CM	25 January 1998 (age 28)	2021	2026	(Turkey) Alanyaspor	Undisclosed
26	Milot Rashica	(Kosovo)	RW	28 June 1996 (age 30)	2022	2023	(England) Norwich City	Loan
27	Sérgio Oliveira	(Portugal)	CM	2 June 1992 (age 34)	2022	2026	(Portugal) Porto	€3,000,000
30	Yusuf Demir	(Austria)	RW	2 June 2003 (age 23)	2022	2026	(Austria) Rapid Wien	€6,000,000
53	Barış Alper Yılmaz	(Turkey)	LW	23 May 2000 (age 26)	2021	2027	(Turkey) Ankara Keçiörengücü	Undisclosed
63	Özgür Baran Aksaka	(Turkey)	AM	29 January 2003 (age 23)	2022	2026	Academy	Trainee
64	Juan Mata	(Spain)	AM	28 April 1988 (age 38)	2022	2023	(England) Manchester United	Free
81	Hamza Akman	(Turkey)	CM	27 September 2004 (age 22)	2022	2024	Academy	Trainee
Forwards
10	Dries Mertens	(Belgium)	CF	6 May 1987 (age 39)	2022	2023	(Italy) Napoli	Free
18	Bafétimbi Gomis (vice-captain)	(France)	CF	6 August 1985 (age 41)	2022	2023	(Saudi Arabia) Al Hilal	Free
99	Mauro Icardi	(Argentina)	CF	19 February 1993 (age 33)	2022	2023	(France) Paris Saint-Germain	Loan
Player(s) on loan during the season
3	Patrick van Aanholt	(Netherlands)	LB	29 August 1990 (age 36)	2021	2024	(England) Crystal Palace	Undisclosed
5	Alpaslan Öztürk	(Turkey)	CB	16 July 1993 (age 33)	2021	2024	(Turkey) Göztepe	Free
8	Taylan Antalyalı	(Turkey)	DM	8 January 1995 (age 31)	2019	2026	(Turkey) BB Erzurumspor	Free
11	Mostafa Mohamed	(Egypt)	CF	28 November 1997 (age 28)	2021	2025	(Egypt) Zamalek	$4,000,000
12	Batuhan Şen	(Turkey)	GK	3 February 1999 (age 27)	2019	2026	Academy	Trainee
17	Oğulcan Çağlayan	(Turkey)	RW	22 March 1996 (age 30)	2020	2024	(Turkey) Çaykur Rizespor	Free
21	Olimpiu Moruțan	(Romania)	AM	25 April 1999 (age 27)	2021	2026	(Romania) FCSB	€3,500,000
24	Işık Kaan Arslan	(Turkey)	CB	28 January 2001 (age 25)	2017	2025	Academy	Trainee
28	Christian Luyindama	(Democratic Republic of the Congo)	CB	8 January 1994 (age 32)	2019	2024	(Belgium) Standard Liège	€5,000,000
30	Atalay Babacan	(Turkey)	AM	28 June 2000 (age 26)	2019	2023	Academy	Trainee
33	Alexandru Cicâldău	(Romania)	AM	8 July 1997 (age 29)	2021	2026	(Romania) Universitatea Craiova	€6,500,000
47	Abdussamed Karnuçu	(Turkey)	DM	4 February 2000 (age 26)	2020	2024	Academy	Trainee
54	Emre Kılınç	(Turkey)	RW	23 August 1994 (age 32)	2020	2024	(Turkey) Sivasspor	Free
62	Eren Aydın	(Turkey)	CF	12 February 2003 (age 23)	2022	2024	Academy	Trainee
90	Metehan Baltacı	(Turkey)	CB	3 November 2002 (age 24)	2021	2026	Academy	Trainee
98	Berk Balaban	(Turkey)	GK	1 January 2000 (age 26)	2020	2025	Academy	Trainee
Player(s) transferred out during the season
9	Haris Seferovic	(Switzerland)	CF	22 February 1992 (age 34)	2022	2023	(Portugal) Benfica	Loan
23	Emre Akbaba	(Turkey)	AM	4 October 1992 (age 34)	2018	2023	(Turkey) Alanyaspor	€4,000,000
—	İsmail Çipe	(Turkey)	GK	5 January 1995 (age 31)	2016	2023	Academy	Trainee

== Transfers ==
=== In ===
==== Summer ====
Date	No.	Pos.	Player	Transferred from	Fee	Source
25 June 2022	42	DF	(Turkey) Abdülkerim Bardakcı	(Turkey) Konyaspor	€2,800,000	
30 June 2022
30 June 2022	—	DF	(Turkey) Süleyman Luş	(Turkey) Bandırmaspor	Loan return	—
30 June 2022	34	GK	(Turkey) Okan Kocuk	(Turkey) Giresunspor	Loan return	—
30 June 2022	—	MF	(Turkey) Abdussamed Karnuçu	(Turkey) Tuzlaspor	Loan return	—
30 June 2022	40	DF	(Turkey) Emin Bayram	(Turkey) Boluspor	Loan return	—
30 June 2022	88	DF	(Turkey) Gökay Güney	(Turkey) Bandırmaspor	Loan return	—
30 June 2022	23	DF	(Turkey) Emre Taşdemir	(Turkey) Giresunspor	Loan return	—
30 June 2022	49	DF	(Nigeria) Valentine Ozornwafor	(Belgium) Sporting Charleroi	Loan return	—
30 June 2022	80	FW	(Turkey) Ali Yavuz Kol	(Turkey) Ankara Keçiörengücü	Loan return	—
30 June 2022	20	MF	(Turkey) Emre Akbaba	(Turkey) Alanyaspor	Loan return	—
30 June 2022	70	MF	(Turkey) Yunus Akgün	(Turkey) Adana Demirspor	Loan return	—
30 June 2022	60	MF	(Turkey) Erkan Süer	(Turkey) Uşakspor	Loan return	—
30 June 2022	30	MF	(Turkey) Atalay Babacan	(Turkey) Ümraniyespor	Loan return	—
30 June 2022	27	DF	(Democratic Republic of the Congo) Christian Luyindama	(Saudi Arabia) Al-Taawoun	Loan return	—
30 June 2022	77	MF	(Nigeria) Jesse Sekidika	(Turkey) Eyüpspor	Loan return	—
30 June 2022	35	MF	(Turkey) Aytaç Kara	(Turkey) Göztepe	Loan return	—
30 June 2022	17	MF	(Turkey) Oğulcan Çağlayan	(Turkey) Eyüpspor	Loan return	—
30 June 2022	98	GK	(Turkey) Berk Balaban	(Turkey) Niğde Anadolu	Loan return	—
1 July 2022	88	DF	(Turkey) Kazımcan Karataş	(Turkey) Altay	€1,150,000	
9 July 2022	27	MF	(Portugal) Sérgio Oliveira	(Portugal) Porto	€3,000,000	
20 July 2022	2	DF	(France) Léo Dubois	(France) Lyon	€2,500,000	
31 July 2022	6	MF	(Norway) Fredrik Midtsjø	(Netherlands) AZ	€3,500,000	
6 August 2022	5	MF	(Uruguay) Lucas Torreira	(England) Arsenal	€6,000,000	
6 August 2022	10	FW	(Belgium) Dries Mertens	(Italy) Napoli	Free	
7 September 2022	30	MF	(Austria) Yusuf Demir	(Austria) Rapid Wien	€6,000,000	
7 September 2022	4	DF	(Denmark) Mathias Ross	(Denmark) AaB	€1,750,000	
8 September 2022	64	MF	(Spain) Juan Mata	(England) Manchester United	Free	

==== Winter ====
Date	No.	Pos.	Player	Transferred from	Fee	Source
8 February 2023	17	MF	(Italy) Nicolò Zaniolo	(Italy) Roma	€15,000,000	

=== Loan in ===
==== Summer ====
Date	No.	Pos.	Player	From	Fee	Option to buy	Source
19 July 2022	9	FW	(Switzerland) Haris Seferovic	(Portugal) Benfica	€1,000,000	Yes	
7 September 2022	99	FW	(Argentina) Mauro Icardi	(France) Paris Saint-Germain	Free	No	
7 September 2022	26	MF	(Kosovo) Milot Rashica	(England) Norwich City	Free	No	

==== Winter ====
Date	No.	Pos.	Player	From	Fee	Option to buy	Source
30 January 2023	23	DF	(Turkey) Kaan Ayhan	(Italy) Sassuolo	€400,000	Yes	
17 February 2023	32	DF	(Canada) Sam Adekugbe	(Turkey) Hatayspor	Free	Yes	

=== Out ===
==== Summer ====
Date	No.	Pos.	Player	Transferred to	Fee	Source
27 May 2022	49	DF	(Nigeria) Valentine Ozornwafor	(Belgium) Sporting Charleroi	€100,000	
30 June 2022	67	FW	(Turkey) Halil Dervişoğlu	(England) Brentford	Loan return	—
30 June 2022	23	GK	(Spain) Iñaki Peña	(Spain) Barcelona	Loan return	—
30 June 2022	15	MF	(Chile) Erick Pulgar	(Italy) Fiorentina	Loan return	—
30 June 2022	99	GK	(France) Fatih Öztürk	Retired	End of contract	—
30 June 2022	8	MF	(Netherlands) Ryan Babel	(Turkey) Eyüpspor	End of contract	
30 June 2022	88	DF	(Turkey) Semih Kaya	Retired	End of contract	
30 June 2022	63	MF	(Turkey) Bartuğ Elmaz	(France) Olympique de Marseille	End of contract	
30 June 2022	66	MF	(Turkey) Arda Turan	Retired	End of contract	
30 June 2022	89	MF	(Algeria) Sofiane Feghouli	(Turkey) Fatih Karagümrük	End of contract	
8 July 2022	45	DF	(Brazil) Marcão	(Spain) Sevilla	€15,000,000	
8 July 2022	—	MF	(Turkey) Erkan Süer	(Turkey) İskenderunspor	Undisclosed	
14 July 2022	80	FW	(Turkey) Ali Yavuz Kol	(Turkey) Adana Demirspor	Undisclosed	
18 July 2022	90	FW	(Senegal) Mbaye Diagne	(Turkey) Fatih Karagümrük	Contract termination	
19 July 2022	—	MF	(Turkey) Selman Faruk Dibek	(Turkey) 1461 Trabzon	Undisclosed	
19 July 2022	—	FW	(Turkey) Atalay Yıldırım	(Turkey) 1461 Trabzon	Free	
2 August 2022	35	MF	(Turkey) Aytaç Kara	(Turkey) Kasımpaşa	Contract termination	
3 August 2022	—	FW	(Turkey) Sarper Çaglar	(Turkey) Hatayspor	Free	
15 August 2022	77	MF	(Nigeria) Jesse Sekidika	(Turkey) Eyüpspor	Contract termination	
2 September 2022	14	DF	(Norway) Omar Elabdellaoui	(Norway) Bodø/Glimt	Contract termination	
8 September 2022	19	DF	(Turkey) Ömer Bayram	(Turkey) Eyüpspor	Contract termination	
9 September 2022	23	MF	(Turkey) Emre Akbaba	(Turkey) Adana Demirspor	€500,000	

==== Winter ====
Date	No.	Pos.	Player	Transferred to	Fee	Source
31 January 2023	9	FW	(Switzerland) Haris Seferovic	(Spain) Celta de Vigo	Contract termination	
17 February 2023	—	GK	(Turkey) İsmail Çipe	(Turkey) Boluspor	Undisclosed	

=== Loan out ===
==== Summer ====
Date	Until	No.	Pos.	Player	Transferred to	Fee	Source
30 June 2022	End of season	5	DF	(Turkey) Alpaslan Öztürk	(Turkey) Eyüpspor	Undisclosed	
6 July 2022	End of season	—	DF	(Turkey) Berkan Mahmut Keskin	(Turkey) Bandırmaspor	Undisclosed	
19 July 2022	End of season	11	FW	(Egypt) Mostafa Mohamed	(France) Nantes	€250,000	
4 August 2022	End of season	21	MF	(Romania) Olimpiu Moruțan	(Italy) Pisa	€150,000	
5 August 2022	End of season	50	DF	(Turkey) Süleyman Luş	(Turkey) Tuzlaspor	Undisclosed	
9 August 2022	End of season	47	MF	(Turkey) Abdussamed Karnuçu	(Turkey) Tarsus İdman Yurdu	Undisclosed	—
9 August 2022	End of season	12	GK	(Turkey) Batuhan Şen	(Turkey) Fatih Karagümrük	Free	
17 August 2022	End of season	24	DF	(Turkey) Işık Kaan Arslan	(Turkey) Sarıyer	Undisclosed	
17 August 2022	End of season	62	FW	(Turkey) Eren Aydın	(Turkey) Sarıyer	Undisclosed	
23 August 2022	End of season	98	GK	(Turkey) Berk Balaban	(Turkey) İskenderun	Undisclosed	
27 August 2022	End of season	33	MF	(Romania) Alexandru Cicâldău	(United Arab Emirates) Al-Ittihad Kalba SC	Undisclosed	
8 September 2022	End of season	54	MF	(Turkey) Emre Kılınç	(Turkey) Ankaragücü	Free	
8 September 2022	End of season	8	MF	(Turkey) Taylan Antalyalı	(Turkey) Ankaragücü	Free	
8 September 2022	End of season	28	DF	(Democratic Republic of the Congo) Christian Luyindama	(Turkey) Antalyaspor	Free	
8 September 2022	End of season	30	MF	(Turkey) Atalay Babacan	(Turkey) Sarıyer	Undisclosed	
8 September 2022	End of season	17	MF	(Turkey) Oğulcan Çağlayan	(Turkey) Giresunspor	Free	

==== Winter ====
Date	Until	No.	Pos.	Player	Transferred to	Fee	Source
12 January 2023	End of season	47	MF	(Turkey) Abdussamed Karnuçu	(Turkey) Amedspor	Undisclosed	
16 January 2023	End of season	17	MF	(Turkey) Oğulcan Çağlayan	(Turkey) Pendikspor	Free	
1 February 2023	30 June 2024	3	DF	(Netherlands) Patrick van Aanholt	(Netherlands) PSV	Undisclosed	
2 February 2023	End of season	90	DF	(Turkey) Metehan Baltacı	(Turkey) Manisa	Undisclosed	

=== Overall transfer activity ===
==== Expenditure ====
Summer: €31,540,000 ▼

Winter: €15,400,000 ▼

Total: €46,940,000 ▼

==== Income ====
Summer: €13,000,000 ▲

Winter: ▲

Total: €13,000,000 ▲

==== Net totals ====
Summer: €18,540,000 ▼

Winter: €15,400,000 ▼

Total: €33,940,000 ▼

=== Contracts renewals ===
No.	Pos.	Nat.	Player	Date	Until	Source
12	GK	(Turkey)	Batuhan Şen	9 August 2022	30 June 2026	
11	MF	(Turkey)	Yunus Akgün	6 December 2022	30 June 2026	
40	DF	(Turkey)	Emin Bayram	16 January 2023	30 June 2026	
63	MF	(Turkey)	Özgür Baran Aksaka	17 January 2023	30 June 2026	
50	GK	(Turkey)	Jankat Yılmaz	26 January 2023	30 June 2025	
90	DF	(Turkey)	Metehan Baltacı	1 February 2023	30 June 2026	
53	MF	(Turkey)	Barış Alper Yılmaz	4 May 2023	30 June 2027	

== Pre-season and friendlies ==
Win Draw Loss Fixtures

=== Pre-season ===
9 July 2022 Friendly	Sturm Graz (Austria)	2–1	(Turkey) Galatasaray	Graz, Austria
20:30 TRT (UTC+3)	Højlund 54', 57'; Schnegg (yellow card) 89'	Report	Çağlayan 7'	Stadium: Merkur Arena; Attendance: 7,500; Referee: Rene Eisner

13 July 2022 Friendly	Galatasaray (Turkey)	0–1	(Hungary) Fehérvár	Hartberg, Austria
20:00 TRT (UTC+3)		Report 1 Report 2	Kodro 31' (yellow card) 50'; Fiola (yellow card) 67'	Stadium: Profertil Arena Hartberg; Attendance: 1,500; Referee: Harald Lechner

16 July 2022 Friendly	Galatasaray (Turkey)	2–0	(Czech Republic) Sigma Olomouc	Hartberg, Austria
20:00 TRT (UTC+3)	Akgün 59'; Gomis 65'	Report 1 Report 2	Růsek (yellow card) 75'	Stadium: Profertil Arena Hartberg; Attendance: 100; Referee: Walter Altmann

19 July 2022 Friendly	Galatasaray (Turkey)	0–0	(Czech Republic) Pardubice	Graz, Austria
19:00 TRT (UTC+3)		Report 1 Report 2	Černý (yellow card) 30'	Stadium: Sportzentrum Graz-Weinzödl

24 July 2022 Friendly	Galatasaray (Turkey)	2–1	(Turkey) Kasımpaşa	Sarıyer, Istanbul
20:00 TRT (UTC+3)	Aktürkoğlu 29'; Kutlu (yellow card) 52'; Seferovic 66'	Report 1 Report 2	Petretta (yellow card) 8'; Hajradinović 35'	Stadium: Nef Stadium; Attendance: 25,000; Referee: Burak Taşkınsoy

27 July 2022 Friendly	Galatasaray (Turkey)	1–1	(Italy) Salernitana	Innsbruck, Austria
20:00 TRT (UTC+3)	Seferovic 13'; Bardakcı (yellow card) 51'; Kılınç (yellow card) 65'	Report 1 Report 2	Botheim 11'; Moțoc (yellow card) 22'	Stadium: Tivoli Stadion Tirol; Attendance: 500; Referee: Walter Altmann

31 July 2022 Friendly	Galatasaray (Turkey)	2–1	(Italy) Fiorentina	Grödig, Austria
19:00 CEST (UTC+1)	Aktürkoğlu 5'; Muslera (yellow card) 37'; Oliveira (yellow card) 41'; Akbaba 42'; Elabdellaoui (yellow card) 46'; Kutlu (yellow card) 69'	Report 1 Report 2	Cabral (yellow card) 49'; González (yellow card) 69'; Sottil 72'; Dodô (yellow card) 89'	Stadium: Untersberg-Arena; Attendance: 3,000; Referee: Andreas Heiß

24 September 2022 Friendly	Galatasaray (Turkey)	2–1	(Turkey) İstanbulspor	Sarıyer, Istanbul
19:00 TRT (UTC+3)	Yılmaz 12'; Icardi 65' (pen.)	Report 1 Report 2	Mehremić 30'	Stadium: Nef Stadium; Attendance: 20,793

=== Mid-season ===
3 December 2022 Friendly	Galatasaray (Turkey)	0–1	(Spain) Rayo Vallecano	Sarıyer, Istanbul
16:00 TRT (UTC+3)		Report 1 Report 2	Martín 34'	Stadium: Nef Stadium; Attendance: 24,128; Referee: Ali Şansalan

6 December 2022 Friendly	Galatasaray (Turkey)	3–4	(Spain) Villarreal	Sarıyer, Istanbul
20:00 TRT (UTC+3)	Gomis 42'; Bardakcı 58'; Aktürkoğlu (yellow card) 81'; Baltacı (yellow card) 85'; Demiroğlu 90' (pen.)	Report 1 Report 2	Coquelin 22'; Mojica 27'; Chukwueze 32'; Medina 44'; Baena (yellow card) 70'; Capoue (yellow card) 81'; Parejo (yellow card) 81'	Stadium: Nef Stadium; Attendance: 2,000; Referee: Çağdaş Altay

10 December 2022 Friendly	Galatasaray (Turkey)	2–2	(Turkey) Adana Demirspor	Antalya
20:00 TRT (UTC+3)	Demir 50', 75'	Report 1 Report 2	Gulbrandsen 13', 60'	Stadium: Mardan Sports Complex; Attendance: 500

13 December 2022 Friendly	Galatasaray (Turkey)	1–2	(Italy) Lazio	Antalya
18:00 TRT (UTC+3)	Yılmaz 4'	Report 1 Report 2	Anderson 11'; Alberto 46'; Zaccagni (yellow card) 60'	Stadium: Emir Hotels Sports Complex

16 December 2022 Friendly	Galatasaray (Turkey)	2–1	(France) Toulouse	Antalya
17:00 TRT (UTC+3)	Gomis 45' (pen.); Mertens 60'	Report 1 Report 2	Nicolaisen 41'; Begraoui (yellow card) 56'	Stadium: Mardan Sports Complex; Attendance: 500

22 February 2023 Friendly	Galatasaray (Turkey)	2–2	(Turkey) Gençlerbirliği	Antalya
14:00 TRT (UTC+3)	Icardi 45'; Yılmaz 90'	Report 1 Report 2	Güreler 50'; Eyibil 63'	Stadium: Kempinski Hotel Belek

22 February 2023 Friendly	Galatasaray (Turkey)	3–1	(Turkey) Pendikspor	Antalya
19:00 TRT (UTC+3)	Kutlu; Akgün; Rashica	Report 1 Report 2		Stadium: Titanic Mardan Stadium

26 February 2023 Friendly	Alanyaspor (Turkey)	2–4	(Turkey) Galatasaray	Alanya, Antalya
18:00 TRT (UTC+3)	Cavaleiro 17'; Eduardo 90'	Report 1 Report 2	Rashica 31'; Yılmaz 69'; Kutlu 77'; Zaniolo 90'	Stadium: Kırbıyık Holding Stadium; Attendance: 8,000; Referee: Murat Erdoğan

4 March 2023 Friendly	İstanbulspor (Turkey)	0–6	(Turkey) Galatasaray	Esenyurt, Istanbul
17:00 TRT (UTC+3)		Report 1 Report 2	Rashica 8'; Oliveira 19'; Gomis 40'; Bayram 55'; Zaniolo 84'; Dubois 88'	Stadium: Esenyurt Necmi Kadıoğlu Stadium; Attendance: 4,000; Referee: Ozan Ergün

26 March 2023 Friendly	Qarabağ (Azerbaijan)	1–2	(Turkey) Galatasaray	Baku, Azerbaijan
19:00 TRT (UTC+3)	Xhixha 19'; Guerrier (yellow card) 32'; Romão (yellow card) 90'	Report 1 Report 2	Gomis 4'; Kutlu (yellow card) 33'; Zaniolo (yellow card) 56'; Icardi 87' (pen.)	Stadium: Baku Olympic Stadium; Attendance: 55,200; Referee: Aliyar Aghayev

== Competitions ==
=== Overall record ===
Competition	First match	Last match	Starting round	Final position	Record							
Competition	First match	Last match	Starting round	Final position	Pld	W	D	L	GF	GA	GD	Win %
Süper Lig	7 August 2022	7 June 2023	Matchday 1	Winners	36	28	4	4	83	27	+56	77.78
Turkish Cup	19 October 2022	5 April 2023	Third round	Quarter-finals	5	4	0	1	14	5	+9	80.00
Total					41	32	4	5	97	32	+65	78.05

Last updated: 7 June 2023
Source: Soccerway

=== Süper Lig ===
==== League table ====
Pos	Team	Pld	W	D	L	GF	GA	GD	Pts	Qualification or relegation
1	Galatasaray (C)	36	28	4	4	83	27	+56	88	Qualification for the Champions League second qualifying round
2	Fenerbahçe	36	25	5	6	87	42	+45	80	Qualification for the Europa Conference League second qualifying round
3	Beşiktaş	36	23	9	4	78	36	+42	78	Qualification for the Europa Conference League second qualifying round
4	Adana Demirspor	36	20	9	7	76	45	+31	69	Qualification for the Europa Conference League second qualifying round
5	Başakşehir	36	18	8	10	54	37	+17	62	

Source: Süper Lig
Rules for classification: 1) Points; 2) Head-to-head points; 3) Head-to-head goal difference; 4) Head-to-head goals scored; 5) Goal difference; 6) Goals scored; 7) Play-off.
(C) Champions

==== Results summary ====
Overall								Home						Away					
Pld	W	D	L	GF	GA	GD	Pts	W	D	L	GF	GA	GD	W	D	L	GF	GA	GD
36	28	4	4	83	27	+56	88	15	2	1	41	15	+26	13	2	3	42	12	+30

Source: TFF.org

Pld = Matches played; W = Matches won; D = Matches drawn; L = Matches lost; GF = Goals for; GA = Goals against; GD = Goal difference; Pts = Points

==== Results by round ====
Round	1	2	3	4	5	6	7	8	9	10	11	12	13	14	15	16	17	18	19	20	21	22	23	24	25	26	27	28	29	30	31	32	33	34	35	36	37	38
Ground	A	H	A	A	H	A	H	A	B	A	H	A	H	A	H	A	H	A	H	H	A	H	H	A	H	A	H	B	H	A	H	A	H	A	H	A	H	A
Result	W	L	W	D	W	W	W	D	B	L	D	W	W	W	W	W	W	W	W	W	W	W	W	W	W	L	W	B	W	W	D	L	W	W	W	W	W	W
Position	5	10	8	7	7	5	2	4	6	7	8	5	3	2	1	1	1	1	1	1	1	1	1	1	1	1	1	1	1	1	1	1	1	1	1	1	1	1

Source: TFF.org
A = Away; H = Home; B = Bye; W = Win; D = Draw; L = Loss

==== Matches ====
7 August 2022 1	Antalyaspor	0–1	Galatasaray	Muratpaşa, Antalya
21:45 TRT	Toprak (yellow card) 43'; Adriano (penalty missed) 45+4'; Kudryashov (yellow card) 90+4'	Report 1 Report 2	Nelsson (yellow card) 14'; Kutlu (yellow card) 45'; Muslera (yellow card) 45+1'; Gomis 90' (yellow card) 90+3'	Stadium: Antalya Stadium; Attendance: 20,085; Referee: Atilla Karaoğlan; Assistant referees: Mustafa Emre İyisoy, İbrahim Çağlar Uyarcan; Fourth official: Suat Arslanboğa

13 August 2022 2	Galatasaray	0–1	Giresunspor	Sarıyer, Istanbul
21:45 TRT	Oliveira (yellow card) 16'; van Aanholt (yellow card) 40'; Aktürkoğlu (yellow card) 74'	Report 1 Report 2	Sainz (yellow card) 26' (goal) 76'; Uludağ (yellow card) 74'	Stadium: Nef Stadium; Attendance: 45,484; Referee: Kadir Sağlam; Assistant referees: Abdullah Bora Özkara, Mustafa Savranlar; Fourth official: Adnan Deniz Kayatepe

19 August 2022 3	Ümraniyespor	0–1	Galatasaray	Başakşehir, Istanbul
21:00 TRT	Göksu (yellow card) 45'; Del Valle (yellow card) 55'; Gheorghe (yellow card) 72'; Gürbulak (yellow card) 76'; Sackey (yellow card) 77'; Gagnidze (yellow card) 86'	Report 1 Report 2	Bardakcı (yellow card) 35'; Gomis 86'; Boey (yellow card) 90+2'	Stadium: Atatürk Olympic Stadium; Attendance: 12,095; Referee: Ali Şansalan; Assistant referees: Samet Çavuş, Ata Yıldırım; Fourth official: Sarper Barış Saka

28 August 2022 4	Trabzonspor	0–0	Galatasaray	Ortahisar, Trabzon
21:45 TRT	Trézéguet (yellow card) 21'; Toköz (yellow card) 47'; Elmalı (yellow card) 63'	Report 1 Report 2	Akgün (yellow card) 15'; Aktürkoğlu (yellow card) 45+4'	Stadium: Şenol Güneş Sports Complex; Attendance: 34,803; Referee: Ali Palabıyık; Assistant referees: Ceyhun Sesigüzel, Kemal Yılmaz; Fourth official: Burak Şeker

5 September 2022 5	Galatasaray	2–1	Gaziantep	Sarıyer, Istanbul
21:00 TRT	Bardakcı (yellow card) 31' (yellow-red card) 45'; Gomis 36' (penalty missed) 73'; Oliveira (yellow card) 40'; Torreira (yellow card) 45'; Kitsiou 90+1' (o.g.)	Report 1 Report 2	Sagal 27'; Güvenç (yellow card) 40'; Maxim (yellow card) 45+5'; Eskihellaç (yellow card) 54'; Soyalp (yellow card) 89'; Kitsiou (yellow card) 90'	Stadium: Nef Stadium; Attendance: 44,100; Referee: Yaşar Kemal Uğurlu; Assistant referees: Ali Saygın Ögel, Alpaslan Dedeş; Fourth official: Çağdaş Altay
Note: Manager Okan Buruk were both cautioned (yellow card) in the 45+4nd minute.

11 September 2022 6	Kasımpaşa	2–3	Galatasaray	Kasımpaşa, Istanbul
20:00 TRT	Eysseric (yellow card) 5'; Bahoken 16'; Çiftpınar 90'; Kara (yellow card) 90+4'	Report 1 Report 2	Gomis 20'; Aktürkoğlu 50', 69'	Stadium: Recep Tayyip Erdoğan Stadium; Attendance: 6,261; Referee: Volkan Bayarslan; Assistant referees: Serkan Ok, Erdinç Sezertam; Fourth official: Ali Şansalan

16 September 2022 7	Galatasaray	2–1	Konyaspor	Sarıyer, Istanbul
20:00 TRT	Oliveira 1'; Aktürkoğlu (yellow card) 21'; Calvo 82' (o.g.); Muslera (yellow card) 89'; Icardi (yellow card) 89'; Midtsjø (yellow card) 90+9'	Report 1 Report 2	Çekiçi 15'; Calvo (yellow card) 68'; Ülgün (yellow card) 84'; Šehić (yellow card) 86' (yellow-red card) 89'	Stadium: Nef Stadium; Attendance: 46,925; Referee: Abdulkadir Bitigen; Assistant referees: Volkan Ahmet Narinç, Hakan Yemişken; Fourth official: Neslihan Muratdağı

1 October 2022 8	Adana Demirspor	0–0	Galatasaray	Sarıçam, Adana
20:00 TRT	Stambouli (yellow card) 43' (yellow-red card) 64'	Report 1 Report 2	Boey (yellow card) 50'; Torreira (yellow card) 84'; Mata (yellow card) 90+3'; Bardakcı (yellow card) 90+4'; Yılmaz (yellow card) 90+8'	Stadium: New Adana Stadium; Attendance: 29,327; Referee: Halil Umut Meler; Assistant referees: Mustafa Emre Eyisoy, Cevdet Kömürcüoğlu; Fourth official: Sarper Barış Saka

9	Bye

15 October 2022 10	Kayserispor	2–1	Galatasaray	Kayseri
20:00 TRT	Gavranović 22'; Bulut 34'; Kemen (yellow card) 38'; Cardoso (yellow card) 66'	Report 1 Report 2	Boey (yellow card) 28'; Yılmaz 86'	Stadium: Kadir Has Stadium; Attendance: 16,441; Referee: Arda Kardeşler; Assistant referees: Aleks Taşcıoğlu, Bahtiyar Birinci; Fourth official: Kadir Sağlam

23 October 2022 11	Galatasaray	2–2	Alanyaspor	Sarıyer, Istanbul
20:00 TRT	Mertens 11'; Icardi 21'; Boey (red card) 32'; Muslera (yellow card) 32'; Rashica (yellow card) 45+3'; Kutlu (yellow card) 90+2'; Bardakcı (red card) 90+4'	Report 1 Report 2	Candeias (yellow card) 18'; Özdemir (yellow card) 30'; Balkovec 68'; Aydın (yellow card) 72'; Hassan 90+1'	Stadium: Nef Stadium; Attendance: 45,034; Referee: Ali Palabıyık; Assistant referees: Erdem Bayık, Serkan Çimen; Fourth official: Erkan Özdamar

28 October 2022 12	Fatih Karagümrük	0–2	Galatasaray	Başakşehir, Istanbul
20:00 TRT	Ugur (red card) 33'; Borini (yellow card) 42'; Durmaz (yellow card) 77'	Report 1 Report 2	Taşdemir 60'; Bayram (yellow card) 78'; Mata 85'	Stadium: Atatürk Olympic Stadium; Attendance: 8,579; Referee: Bahattin Şimşek; Assistant referees: Kerem Ersoy, Mustafa Sönmez; Fourth official: Burak Şeker

5 November 2022 13	Galatasaray	2–1	Beşiktaş	Sarıyer, Istanbul
20:00 TRT	Icardi 18', 59'; Mertens (yellow card) 42'; Oliveira (yellow card) 89'; Torreira (yellow card) 90+1'	Report 1 Report 2	Tosun 28'; Souza (yellow card) 73'; Redmond (yellow card) 73'; Uysal (yellow card) 77'; Bingöl (yellow card) 90+3'	Stadium: Nef Stadium; Attendance: 50,237; Referee: Halil Umut Meler; Assistant referees: Mustafa Emre Eyisoy, İbrahim Çağlar Uyarcan; Fourth official: Kadir Sağlam

12 November 2022 14	Başakşehir	0–7	Galatasaray	Başakşehir, Istanbul
20:00 TRT	Ndayishimiye (yellow card) 44'; Aleksić (yellow card) 83'	Report 1 Report 2	Aktürkoğlu 14', 59', 85'; Icardi 45' (pen.); Ndayishimiye 45+3' (o.g.); Mertens 65'; Rashica (yellow card) 74'; Muslera (yellow card) 76'; Bardakcı 88'	Stadium: Başakşehir Fatih Terim Stadium; Attendance: 7,771; Referee: Atilla Karaoğlan; Assistant referees: Ceyhun Sesigüzel, Serkan Ok; Fourth official: Ali Şansalan

25 December 2022 15	Galatasaray	2–1	İstanbulspor	Sarıyer, Istanbul
19:00 TRT	Gomis 15', 37'; Karataş (yellow card) 50'; Mertens (yellow card) 57'; Bardakcı (yellow card) 81'; Torreira (yellow card) 88'	Report 1 Report 2	Aksu (yellow card) 31'; Rroca (yellow card) 69'; Yeşil 82'	Stadium: Nef Stadium; Attendance: 40,935; Referee: Abdulkadir Bitigen; Assistant referees: Serkan Olguncan, Aleks Taşcıoğlu; Fourth official: Kadir Sağlam

29 December 2022 16	Sivasspor	1–2	Galatasaray	Sivas
17:00 TRT	Saba (yellow card) 23'; Çiftçi (yellow card) 62'; Yeşilyurt (yellow card) 70' (yellow-red card) 90+9' (goal) 80'	Report 1 Report 2	Mertens 27' (yellow card) 59'; van Aanholt (yellow card) 34'; Boey (yellow card) 44'; Oliveira (yellow card) 48'; Yılmaz 90+5' (yellow card) 90+10'	Stadium: New Sivas 4 Eylül Stadium; Attendance: 9,532; Referee: Erkan Özdamar; Assistant referees: Cevdet Kömürcüoğlu, Ali Saygın Ögel; Fourth official: Turgut Doman

4 January 2023 17	Galatasaray	2–1	Ankaragücü	Sarıyer, Istanbul
20:00 TRT	Yılmaz 16' (yellow card) 72'; Gomis 30'; Midtsjø (yellow card) 71'	Report 1 Report 2	Antalyalı 7'; Zahid (yellow card) 50'; Diack (yellow card) 77'; Güreler (yellow card) 90+6'	Stadium: Nef Stadium; Attendance: 42,124; Referee: Zorbay Küçük; Assistant referees: Kerem Ersoy, Abdullah Bora Özkara; Fourth official: Burak Şeker

8 January 2023 18	Fenerbahçe	0–3	Galatasaray	Kadıköy, Istanbul
19:00 TRT	Henrique (yellow card) 11'; Kahveci (red card) 86'; Valencia (yellow card) 87'; Yandaş (yellow card) 88'	Report 1 Report 2	Boey (yellow card) 26'; Oliveira (yellow card) 26' (goal) 32'; Nelsson (yellow card) 34'; Mertens (yellow card) 45'; Kutlu (yellow card) 75'; Aktürkoğlu 78'; Dubois (yellow card) 87'; Icardi 90+10' (yellow card) 90+10'	Stadium: Şükrü Saracoğlu Stadium; Attendance: 45,798; Referee: Halil Umut Meler; Assistant referees: Mustafa Emre Eyisoy, Süleyman Özay; Fourth official: Abdulkadir Bitigen

13 January 2023 19	Galatasaray	4–0	Hatayspor	Sarıyer, Istanbul
20:00 TRT	Aktürkoğlu 9'; Mata 45+4', 45+6'; Gomis 76'	Report 1 Report 2		Stadium: Nef Stadium; Attendance: 43,052; Referee: Kadir Sağlam; Assistant referees: Murat Altan, Ogün Kamacı; Fourth official: Sarper Barış Saka

21 January 2023 20	Galatasaray	2–1	Antalyaspor	Sarıyer, Istanbul
19:00 TRT	Icardi 50'; Floranus 59' (o.g.); Oliveira (yellow card) 90+3'; Bardakcı (yellow card) 90+10'	Report 1 Report 2	Vural (yellow card) 15'; Adriano 55' (red card) 90+10'; Larsson (yellow card) 60'; Balcı (yellow card) 90+2'	Stadium: Nef Stadium; Attendance: 47,033; Referee: Ali Şansalan; Assistant referees: Serkan Olguncan, Mehmet Emin Tuğral; Fourth official: Tugay Kaan Numanoğlu

28 January 2023 21	Giresunspor	0–4	Galatasaray	Giresun
19:00 TRT	Arias (yellow card) 42'; Bajić (yellow card) 62'; Savićević (yellow card) 63'	Report 1 Report 2	Icardi (penalty missed) 45'; Mertens 45+3'; Dubois 60'; Rashica 88'; Akgün 90+5'	Stadium: Çotanak Sports Complex; Attendance: 14,924; Referee: Bahattin Şimşek; Assistant referees: Cevdet Kömürcüoğlu, Candaş Elbil; Fourth official: Yiğit Arslan

1 February 2023 22	Galatasaray	3–2	Ümraniyespor	Sarıyer, Istanbul
20:00 TRT	Bardakcı 32'; Icardi 60' (pen.), 83'	Report 1 Report 2	Nayir 11' (yellow card) 90+2'; Gürbulak 39'; Avounou (yellow card) 45' (yellow-red card) 77'	Stadium: Nef Stadium; Attendance: 43,832; Referee: Cihan Aydın; Assistant referees: İbrahim Çağlar Uyarcan, Aleks Taşcıoğlu; Fourth official: Mustafa Kürşad Filiz

5 February 2023 23	Galatasaray	2–1	Trabzonspor	Sarıyer, Istanbul
19:00 TRT	Mertens 18'; Nelsson (yellow card) 20'; Icardi 53' (pen.)	Report 1 Report 2	Gómez 1'; Elmalı (yellow card) 20'; Trézéguet (yellow card) 51'; Gbamin (yellow card) 77'	Stadium: Nef Stadium; Attendance: 48,656; Referee: Halil Umut Meler; Assistant referees: Cevdet Kömürcüoğlu, Ekrem Kan; Fourth official: Kadir Sağlam

5 March 2023 24	Gaziantep	0–3 (w/o)	Galatasaray	Şehitkamil, Gaziantep
		Report		Stadium: Gaziantep Stadium
Note: Originally scheduled to be played on 13 February 2023. Postponed due to the 2023 Turkey–Syria earthquake. Gaziantep withdrew from the league due to the 2023 Turkey–Syria earthquake and Galatasaray, therefore, were awarded a 3–0 win.

11 March 2023 25	Galatasaray	1–0	Kasımpaşa	Sarıyer, Istanbul
19:00 TRT	Torreira (yellow card) 47'; Zaniolo 57' (yellow card) 90+4'; Nelsson (yellow card) 75'	Report 1 Report 2	Malsa (yellow card) 44'; Tırpan (yellow card) 50'	Stadium: Nef Stadium; Attendance: 45,908; Referee: Atilla Karaoğlan; Assistant referees: Ceyhun Sesigüzel, Kerem Ersoy; Fourth official: Burak Şeker
Note: Originally scheduled to be played on 20 February 2023. Postponed due to the 2023 Turkey–Syria earthquake.

17 March 2023 26	Konyaspor	2–1	Galatasaray	Selçuklu, Konya
20:00 TRT	Emreli (yellow card) 15'; Oğuz (yellow card) 15'; Dikmen 62'; Calvo (yellow card) 69'; Çekiçi (yellow card) 89'; Ülgün 90+3' (yellow card) 90+4'; Šehić (yellow card) 90+4'	Report 1 Report 2	Rashica 31'; Kutlu (yellow card) 36'; Icardi (yellow card) 36'; Boey (yellow card) 61'; Muslera (yellow card) 90+4'	Stadium: Konya Metropolitan Municipality Stadium; Attendance: 28,008; Referee: Zorbay Küçük; Assistant referees: Ali Saygın Ögel, Furkan Ürün; Fourth official: Cihan Aydın
Note: Originally scheduled to be played on 26 February 2023. Postponed due to the 2023 Turkey–Syria earthquake.

1 April 2023 27	Galatasaray	2–0	Adana Demirspor	Sarıyer, Istanbul
20:30 TRT	Oliveira (yellow card) 31'; Mertens (yellow card) 55'; Adekugbe (yellow card) 59'; Midtsjø 86'; Zaniolo 90+8' (pen.); Boey (yellow card) 90+12'	Report 1 Report 2	Svensson (yellow card) 35'; Akbaba (yellow card) 38'; David (yellow card) 40'; Gulbrandsen (yellow card) 90+11'	Stadium: Nef Stadium; Attendance: 44,782; Referee: Ali Şansalan; Assistant referees: Serkan Olguncan, Serkan Ok; Fourth official: Yiğit Arslan

28	Bye

14 April 2023 29	Galatasaray	6–0	Kayserispor	Sarıyer, Istanbul
20:30 TRT	Icardi 18', 42' (pen.), 45+12' (penalty missed) 45+12'; Rashica 24'; Mertens (yellow card) 35'; Aktürkoğlu 59'; Zaniolo 72'; Adekugbe (yellow card) 80'	Report 1 Report 2	Hosseini (red card) 45+10'	Stadium: Nef Stadium; Attendance: 42,379; Referee: Mustafa Kürşad Filiz; Assistant referees: Cevdet Kömürcüoğlu, Candaş Elbil; Fourth official: Yiğit Arslan

18 April 2023 30	Alanyaspor	1–4	Galatasaray	Alanya, Antalya
20:30 TRT	Karaca 16' (pen.); Özdemir (yellow card) 31'; Doumbia (yellow card) 56'; Pereira (yellow card) 85'	Report 1 Report 2	Bardakcı 14'; Icardi 42'; Mertens 48'; Rashica 63'; Yılmaz (yellow card) 90+1'	Stadium: Kırbıyık Holding Stadium; Referee: Abdulkadir Bitigen; Assistant referees: Mustafa Emre Eyisoy, Mustafa Savranlar; Fourth official: Mert Güzenge

23 April 2023 31	Galatasaray	3–3	Fatih Karagümrük	Sarıyer, Istanbul
19:00 TRT	Aktürkoğlu 3'; Oliveira 45+1' (pen.); Icardi (penalty missed) 67'; Boey 80'	Report 1 Report 2	Diagne 18'; Borini 26', 31'; Nicholas (yellow card) 48'; Mercan (yellow card) 85'; Drešević (yellow card) 90+4'	Stadium: Nef Stadium; Attendance: 45,101; Referee: Volkan Bayarslan; Assistant referees: Erdem Bayık, Esat Sancaktar; Fourth official: Murat Erdoğan

30 April 2023 32	Beşiktaş	3–1	Galatasaray	Beşiktaş, Istanbul
19:00 TRT	Saïss 35' (yellow card) 67'; Hadžiahmetović 59'; Masuaku (yellow card) 69'; Rosier (yellow card) 70'; Uçan (yellow card) 75'; Aboubakar 90+4' (yellow card) 90+4'; Colley (yellow card) 90+6'	Report 1 Report 2	Icardi 20'; Rashica (yellow card) 45+3'; Yılmaz (yellow card) 72'	Stadium: Vodafone Park; Attendance: 39,165; Referee: Ali Şansalan; Assistant referees: Ceyhun Sesigüzel, Mehmet Emin Tuğral; Fourth official: Tugay Kaan Numanoğlu

8 May 2023 33	Galatasaray	1–0	Başakşehir	Sarıyer, Istanbul
20:00 TRT	Boey (yellow card) 38'; Icardi 45+7' (pen.); Torreira (yellow card) 60'	Report 1 Report 2	Biglia (yellow card) 10'	Stadium: Nef Stadium; Attendance: 47,708; Referee: Halil Umut Meler; Assistant referees: Mustafa Emre Eyisoy, Kerem Ersoy; Fourth official: Çağdaş Altay

16 May 2023 34	İstanbulspor	0–2	Galatasaray	Kasımpaşa, Istanbul
20:00 TRT	Rroca (yellow card) 41'; Aksu (yellow card) 45+9'; Erdoğan (yellow card) 83'	Report 1 Report 2	Icardi 45+11' (pen.), 89'; Midtsjø (yellow card) 71'; Zaniolo (red card) 75'	Stadium: Recep Tayyip Erdoğan Stadium; Referee: Tugay Kaan Numanoğlu; Assistant referees: Abdullah Bora Özkara, Cem Özbay; Fourth official: Direnç Tonusluoğlu

20 May 2023 35	Galatasaray	2–0	Sivasspor	Sarıyer, Istanbul
19:00 TRT	Icardi 13', 63'; Mertens (yellow card) 55'	Report 1 Report 2	Yalçın (yellow card) 45+1'	Stadium: Nef Stadium; Attendance: 44,992; Referee: Arda Kardeşler; Assistant referees: Cevdet Kömürcüoğlu, İbrahim Çağlar Uyarcan; Fourth official: Çağdaş Altay

30 May 2023 36	Ankaragücü	1–4	Galatasaray	Eryaman, Ankara
20:00 TRT	Milson 16'; Kızıldağ (yellow card) 24'; Diack (yellow card) 34'; Mujakić (yellow card) 54'	Report 1 Report 2	Icardi 7', 39'; Yılmaz 73'; Oliveira 77'	Stadium: Eryaman Stadium; Referee: Volkan Bayarslan; Assistant referees: Ceyhun Sesigüzel, Volkan Ahmet Narinç; Fourth official: Burak Şeker

4 June 2023 37	Galatasaray	3–0	Fenerbahçe	Sarıyer, Istanbul
19:00 TRT	Nelsson (yellow card) 12'; Zaniolo 28', 79'; Icardi 71'	Report 1 Report 2	Kahveci (yellow card) 36'; Peres (red card) 61'; Zajc (yellow card) 82'; Yüksek (yellow card) 90+1'	Stadium: Nef Stadium; Attendance: 51,005; Referee: Abdulkadir Bitigen; Assistant referees: Mustafa Savranlar, Süleyman Özay; Fourth official: Arda Kardeşler

7 June 2023 38	Hatayspor	0–3 (w/o)	Galatasaray	Antakya, Hatay
		Report		Stadium: New Hatay Stadium
Note: Hatayspor withdrew from the league due to the 2023 Turkey–Syria earthquake and Galatasaray, therefore, are awarded a 3–0 win.

=== Turkish Cup ===
19 October 2022 Third round	Galatasaray	7–0	Kastamonuspor 1966	Sarıyer, Istanbul
21:00 TRT	Rashica 27', 56'; Gomis (yellow card) 37' (goal) 53'; Seferovic 39'; Ross 65'; Akman (yellow card) 70' (goal) 81'; Aktürkoğlu 74'	Report 1 Report 2	Gürbüz (yellow card) 26'; Olkan (yellow card) 40'; Yücel (yellow card) 45'	Stadium: Nef Stadium; Attendance: 21,981; Referee: Yiğit Arslan; Assistant referees: Güner Mumcu Taştan, Çağrıcan Pazarcıklı; Fourth official: Feridun Daldaş

8 November 2022 Fourth round	Galatasaray	2–1	Yeşilyurt Ofspor	Sarıyer, Istanbul
21:00 TRT	Seferovic 37'; Kutlu 79'	Report 1 Report 2	Türkyılmaz 18'; Erçin (yellow card) 62'; Işık (yellow card) 67'	Stadium: Nef Stadium; Attendance: 23,005; Referee: Cihan Aydın; Assistant referees: Cemal Alpay, Mehmet Akıncık; Fourth official: Oğuzhan Çakır

22 December 2022 Fifth round	Galatasaray	1–0	Ankara Keçiörengücü	Sarıyer, Istanbul
21:00 TRT	Seferovic (penalty missed) 41'; Gomis 82'; Muslera (yellow card) 90+4'	Report 1 Report 2	Camara (yellow card) 20'; Muhammed (yellow card) 60'	Stadium: Nef Stadium; Referee: Çağdaş Altay; Assistant referees: Volkan Ahmet Narinç, Gökhan Barcın; Fourth official: Onur Özütoprak

17 January 2023 Round of 16	Alanyaspor	1–2	Galatasaray	Alanya, Antalya
20:30 TRT	Eduardo (yellow card) 43'; Cavaleiro 67'; Aksoy (yellow card) 85'	Report 1 Report 2	Nelsson 16'; Mertens 38'; Dubois (yellow card) 85'; Kocuk (yellow card) 90+6'	Stadium: Kırbıyık Holding Stadium; Referee: Volkan Bayarslan; Assistant referees: Ekrem Kan, Samet Çiçek; Fourth official: Fatih Tokail

5 April 2023 Quarter-finals	Galatasaray	2–3	Başakşehir	Sarıyer, Istanbul
20:30 TRT	Ayhan 20'; Icardi 51'	Report 1 Report 2	Szysz 12', 66'; Tekdemir (yellow card) 16'; Aleksić 30'; Biglia (yellow card) 90+4'	Stadium: Nef Stadium; Attendance: 31,629; Referee: Kadir Sağlam; Assistant referees: Volkan Ahmet Narinç, Mustafa Sönmez; Fourth official: Burak Pakkan

== Statistics ==
=== Appearances and goals ===
No.	Pos	Nat	Player	Total		Süper Lig		Turkish Cup	
No.	Pos	Nat	Player	Apps	Goals	Apps	Goals	Apps	Goals
Goalkeepers
1	GK	(Uruguay) URU	Fernando Muslera	35	0	33	0	2	0
34	GK	(Turkey) TUR	Okan Kocuk	5	0	2	0	3	0
50	GK	(Turkey) TUR	Jankat Yılmaz	0	0	0	0	0	0
Defenders
2	DF	(France) FRA	Léo Dubois	25	1	21	1	4	0
4	DF	(Denmark) DEN	Mathias Ross	2	1	0	0	2	1
13	DF	(Turkey) TUR	Emre Taşdemir	6	1	5	1	1	0
23	DF	(Turkey) TUR	Kaan Ayhan	6	1	5	0	1	1
25	DF	(Denmark) DEN	Victor Nelsson	35	1	33	0	2	1
32	DF	(Canada) CAN	Sam Adekugbe	6	0	6	0	0	0
40	DF	(Turkey) TUR	Emin Bayram	11	0	7	0	4	0
42	DF	(Turkey) TUR	Abdülkerim Bardakcı	33	3	30	3	3	0
46	DF	(Turkey) TUR	Gökay Güney	0	0	0	0	0	0
88	DF	(Turkey) TUR	Kazımcan Karataş	12	0	11	0	1	0
93	DF	(France) FRA	Sacha Boey	33	1	31	1	2	0
Midfielders
5	MF	(Uruguay) URU	Lucas Torreira	34	0	31	0	3	0
6	MF	(Norway) NOR	Fredrik Midtsjø	25	1	21	1	4	0
7	MF	(Turkey) TUR	Kerem Aktürkoğlu	38	10	34	9	4	1
11	MF	(Turkey) TUR	Yunus Akgün	28	1	25	1	3	0
17	MF	(Italy) ITA	Nicolò Zaniolo	11	5	10	5	1	0
22	MF	(Turkey) TUR	Berkan Kutlu	28	1	24	0	4	1
26	MF	(Kosovo) KOS	Milot Rashica	30	6	26	4	4	2
27	MF	(Portugal) POR	Sérgio Oliveira	34	4	32	4	2	0
30	MF	(Austria) AUT	Yusuf Demir	6	0	5	0	1	0
53	MF	(Turkey) TUR	Barış Alper Yılmaz	30	4	25	4	5	0
63	MF	(Turkey) TUR	Özgür Baran Aksaka	3	0	1	0	2	0
64	MF	(Spain) ESP	Juan Mata	18	3	16	3	2	0
81	MF	(Turkey) TUR	Hamza Akman	2	1	1	0	1	1
Forwards
10	FW	(Belgium) BEL	Dries Mertens	33	7	30	6	3	1
18	FW	(France) FRA	Bafétimbi Gomis	28	10	23	8	5	2
99	FW	(Argentina) ARG	Mauro Icardi	26	23	24	22	2	1
Players transferred/loaned out during the season
3	DF	(Netherlands) NED	Patrick van Aanholt	14	0	10	0	4	0
8	MF	(Turkey) TUR	Taylan Antalyalı	1	0	1	0	0	0
9	FW	(Switzerland) SUI	Haris Seferovic	13	2	10	0	3	2
23	MF	(Turkey) TUR	Emre Akbaba	5	0	5	0	0	0
33	MF	(Romania) ROU	Alexandru Cicâldău	1	0	1	0	0	0
54	MF	(Turkey) TUR	Emre Kılınç	2	0	2	0	0	0
90	DF	(Turkey) TUR	Metehan Baltacı	2	0	0	0	2	0

Last updated: 4 June 2023.
Source: FBref.com, ntvspor.net

=== Goalscorers ===
Rank	No.	Pos	Nat	Name	Süper Lig	Turkish Cup	Total
1	99	FW	(Argentina)	Mauro Icardi	22	1	23
2	7	MF	(Turkey)	Kerem Aktürkoğlu	9	1	10
2	18	FW	(France)	Bafétimbi Gomis	8	2	10
3	10	FW	(Belgium)	Dries Mertens	6	1	7
4	26	MF	(Kosovo)	Milot Rashica	4	2	6
5	17	MF	(Italy)	Nicolò Zaniolo	5	0	5
6	27	MF	(Portugal)	Sérgio Oliveira	4	0	4
6	53	MF	(Turkey)	Barış Alper Yılmaz	4	0	4
7	42	DF	(Turkey)	Abdülkerim Bardakcı	3	0	3
7	64	MF	(Spain)	Juan Mata	3	0	3
8	9	FW	(Switzerland)	Haris Seferovic	0	2	2
9	2	DF	(France)	Léo Dubois	1	0	1
9	4	DF	(Denmark)	Mathias Ross	0	1	1
9	6	MF	(Norway)	Fredrik Midtsjø	1	0	1
9	11	MF	(Turkey)	Yunus Akgün	1	0	1
9	13	DF	(Turkey)	Emre Taşdemir	1	0	1
9	22	MF	(Turkey)	Berkan Kutlu	0	1	1
9	23	DF	(Turkey)	Kaan Ayhan	0	1	1
9	25	DF	(Denmark)	Victor Nelsson	0	1	1
9	81	MF	(Turkey)	Hamza Akman	0	1	1
9	93	DF	(France)	Sacha Boey	1	0	1
Own goals					4	0	4
Awarded					6	0	6
Totals					83	14	97

Last updated: 7 June 2023.
Source: FBref.com, ntvspor.net

=== Hat-tricks ===
Player	Against	Result	Date	Competition	Ref
(Turkey) Kerem Aktürkoğlu	Başakşehir	7–0 (A)	12 November 2022	Süper Lig	
(Argentina) Mauro Icardi	Kayserispor	6–0 (H)	14 April 2023	Süper Lig	

(H) – Home; (A) – Away

=== Assists ===
Rank	No.	Pos	Nat	Name	Süper Lig	Turkish Cup	Total
1	7	MF	(Turkey)	Kerem Aktürkoğlu	11	2	13
2	99	FW	(Argentina)	Mauro Icardi	7	1	8
3	26	MF	(Kosovo)	Milot Rashica	6	0	6
4	27	MF	(Portugal)	Sérgio Oliveira	4	1	5
5	10	FW	(Belgium)	Dries Mertens	3	1	4
5	93	DF	(France)	Sacha Boey	4	0	4
6	2	DF	(France)	Léo Dubois	1	2	3
6	42	DF	(Turkey)	Abdülkerim Bardakcı	3	0	3
7	3	DF	(Netherlands)	Patrick van Aanholt	2	0	2
7	6	MF	(Norway)	Fredrik Midtsjø	2	0	2
7	11	MF	(Turkey)	Yunus Akgün	2	0	2
7	18	FW	(France)	Bafétimbi Gomis	0	2	2
7	22	MF	(Turkey)	Berkan Kutlu	0	2	2
7	53	MF	(Turkey)	Barış Alper Yılmaz	2	0	2
7	64	MF	(Spain)	Juan Mata	1	1	2
8	17	MF	(Italy)	Nicolò Zaniolo	0	1	1
8	32	DF	(Canada)	Sam Adekugbe	1	0	1
Totals					49	13	62

Last updated: 4 June 2023.
Source: FBref.com, ntvspor.net

=== Clean sheets ===
Rank	No.	Pos	Nat	Name	Süper Lig	Turkish Cup	Total
1	1	GK	(Uruguay)	Fernando Muslera	16	1	17
2	34	GK	(Turkey)	Okan Kocuk	0	1	1
3	50	GK	(Turkey)	Jankat Yılmaz	0	0	0
Totals					16	2	18

Last updated: 4 June 2023.
Source: FBref.com

=== Disciplinary record ===
No.	Pos	Nat	Name	Süper Lig			Turkish Cup			Total		
No.	Pos	Nat	Name	Yellow card	(yellow card) (yellow-red card)	Red card	Yellow card	(yellow card) (yellow-red card)	Red card	Yellow card	(yellow card) (yellow-red card)	Red card
1	GK	(Uruguay)	Fernando Muslera	5	0	0	1	0	0	6	0	0
2	DF	(France)	Léo Dubois	1	0	0	1	0	0	2	0	0
3	DF	(Netherlands)	Patrick van Aanholt	2	0	0	0	0	0	2	0	0
5	MF	(Uruguay)	Lucas Torreira	6	0	0	0	0	0	6	0	0
6	MF	(Norway)	Fredrik Midtsjø	3	0	0	0	0	0	3	0	0
7	MF	(Turkey)	Kerem Aktürkoğlu	3	0	0	0	0	0	3	0	0
10	FW	(Belgium)	Dries Mertens	7	0	0	0	0	0	7	0	0
11	MF	(Turkey)	Yunus Akgün	1	0	0	0	0	0	1	0	0
17	MF	(Italy)	Nicolò Zaniolo	1	0	1	0	0	0	1	0	1
18	FW	(France)	Bafétimbi Gomis	1	0	0	1	0	0	2	0	0
22	MF	(Turkey)	Berkan Kutlu	4	0	0	0	0	0	4	0	0
25	DF	(Denmark)	Victor Nelsson	5	0	0	0	0	0	5	0	0
26	MF	(Kosovo)	Milot Rashica	3	0	0	0	0	0	3	0	0
27	MF	(Portugal)	Sérgio Oliveira	7	0	0	0	0	0	7	0	0
32	DF	(Canada)	Sam Adekugbe	2	0	0	0	0	0	2	0	0
34	GK	(Turkey)	Okan Kocuk	0	0	0	1	0	0	1	0	0
40	DF	(Turkey)	Emin Bayram	1	0	0	0	0	0	1	0	0
42	DF	(Turkey)	Abdülkerim Bardakcı	4	1	1	0	0	0	4	1	1
53	MF	(Turkey)	Barış Alper Yılmaz	5	0	0	0	0	0	5	0	0
64	MF	(Spain)	Juan Mata	1	0	0	0	0	0	1	0	0
81	MF	(Turkey)	Hamza Akman	0	0	0	1	0	0	1	0	0
88	DF	(Turkey)	Kazımcan Karataş	1	0	0	0	0	0	1	0	0
93	DF	(France)	Sacha Boey	8	0	1	0	0	0	8	0	1
99	FW	(Argentina)	Mauro Icardi	3	0	0	0	0	0	3	0	0
Totals				74	1	3	5	0	0	79	1	3

Last updated: 4 June 2023.
Source: FBref.com, ntvspor.net

=== Game as captain ===
Rank	No.	Pos	Nat	Name	Süper Lig	Turkish Cup	Total
1	1	GK	(Uruguay)	Fernando Muslera	33	2	35
2	18	FW	(France)	Bafétimbi Gomis	1	3	4
Totals					34	5	39

Last updated: 4 June 2023.
Source: FBref.com

== Injury record ==
N	P	Nat.	Name	Type	Status	Source	Match	Inj. Date	Ret. Date
40	DF	(Turkey)	Emin Bayram	Unknown Injury		cnnturk.com	vs Pardubice	19 July 2022	15 August 2022
2	DF	(France)	Léo Dubois	Disrupted Calf Muscle		Galatasaray.org	vs Fiorentina	31 July 2022	11 September 2022
6	MF	(Norway)	Fredrik Midtsjø	Calf Strain		Galatasaray.org	in training	18 August 2022	12 September 2022
30	MF	(Austria)	Yusuf Demir	Foot Injury		GalatasaraySK	in training	30 September 2022	7 October 2022
99	FW	(Argentina)	Mauro Icardi	Muscular problems		GalatasaraySK	in training	30 September 2022	5 October 2022
30	MF	(Austria)	Yusuf Demir	Thigh Muscle Strain		cnnturk.com	in training	27 October 2022	13 November 2022
4	DF	(Denmark)	Mathias Ross	Twisted knee		fotomac.com.tr	vs Yeşilyurt Ofspor	8 November 2022	9 January 2023
26	MF	(Kosovo)	Milot Rashica	Ankle fracture		fotomac.com.tr	vs Medipol Başakşehir	12 November 2022	11 December 2022
13	DF	(Turkey)	Emre Taşdemir	Unknown Injury		cumhuriyet.com.tr	vs Medipol Başakşehir	12 November 2022	28 December 2022
27	MF	(Portugal)	Sérgio Oliveira	Ruptured sideband in the ankle		Galatasaray.org	in training	28 November 2022	23 December 2022
99	FW	(Argentina)	Mauro Icardi	Muscle Injury		Galatasaray.org	in training	30 November 2022	2 January 2023
11	MF	(Turkey)	Yunus Akgün	Twisted knee		Galatasaray.org	vs Villarreal	6 December 2022	30 December 2022
88	DF	(Turkey)	Kazımcan Karataş	Torn ankle ligament		Galatasaray.org	vs İstanbulspor	25 December 2022	19 January 2023
13	DF	(Turkey)	Emre Taşdemir	Unknown Injury		Galatasaray.org	in training	2 January 2023	8 January 2023
1	GK	(Uruguay)	Fernando Muslera	Foot Injury		Galatasaray.org	vs Trabzonspor	5 February 2023	8 March 2023
10	FW	(Belgium)	Dries Mertens	Twisted knee		Galatasaray.org	in training	20 February 2023	22 March 2023
6	MF	(Norway)	Fredrik Midtsjø	Thigh Muscle Strain		Galatasaray.org	vs Alanyaspor	26 February 2023	22 March 2023
42	DF	(Turkey)	Abdülkerim Bardakcı	Calf Strain		Galatasaray.org	in training	5 April 2023	12 April 2023
18	FW	(France)	Bafétimbi Gomis	Hip problems		beinsports.com.tr	in training	21 April 2023	26 April 2023

- Player is injured
- Player has recovered from injury
Last updated: 4 June 2023
Source: Galatasaray Sports Club

== Attendances ==
As of 04 June 2023

Competition	Total. Att.	Avg. Att.
Süper Lig	819,287	45,516
Turkish Cup	76,615	25,538
Total	895,902	42,662

- Sold season tickets: 40,105 (stopped at 40,105)
