= Kazımcan Karataş =

Turkish footballer

Personal information
- Date of birth: 16 January 2003 (age 23)
- Place of birth: İzmir, Turkey
- Height: 1.82 m (6 ft 0 in)
- Position: Left-back

Team information
- Current team: Galatasaray
- Number: 88

Youth career
- 2009–2020: Altay

Senior career*
Years	Team	Apps	(Gls)
2020–2022	Altay	30	(1)
2022–	Galatasaray	27	(0)
2024	→ Ankaragücü (loan)	11	(0)
2024–2025	→ Orenburg (loan)	18	(1)
2026	→ İstanbul Başakşehir (loan)	11	(0)

International career^{‡}
2019	Turkey U17	3	(0)
2021	Turkey U19	5	(0)
2022–	Turkey U21	10	(0)
- * Club domestic league appearances and goals as of 3 June 2026 ‡ National team caps and goals as of 21 November 2023

Kazımcan Karataş (born 16 January 2003) is a Turkish professional footballer who plays as a left back for Süper Lig club İstanbul Başakşehir on loan from Galatasaray.

== Professional career ==
=== Altay ===
Karataş is a youth product of Altay since the age of 6. He made his senior debut with them in January 2020 in the TFF First League. Shortly after, he signed his first professional contract with the club. He made his professional debut with Altay in a 1-0 Süper Lig loss to Antalyaspor on 6 November 2021.

=== Galatasaray ===
On 1 July 2022, Galatasaray announced that an agreement was reached with Karataş. It has been announced that an agreement has been reached with the football player for 5 seasons, starting from the 2022–23 season. Accordingly, a transfer fee of 1.150.000 Euros will be paid to Altay for the transfer of the young football player. He earned his first cap with Galatasaray on 13 August 2022, Saturday, coming from bench on 77th minute in match week 2 encounter against Giresunspor, in which Galatasaray lost at home 0–1.

Karataş became the champion in the Süper Lig in the 2022–23 season with the Galatasaray team. Defeating Ankaragücü 4-1 away in the match played in the 36th week on 30 May 2023, Galatasaray secured the lead with 2 weeks before the end and won the 23rd championship in its history.

=== Ankaragücü (loan) ===
On 8 February 2024, Ankaragücü signed Karataş on loan for the 2023–24 season.

=== Orenburg (loan) ===
On 29 July 2024, Karataş was loaned out to the Russian Premier League club Orenburg for one season.

=== İstanbul Başakşehir (loan) ===
On February 6, 2026, he signed a loan contract with İstanbul Başakşehir until the end of the season.

== International career ==
Born in Turkey, Karataş is an ethnic Turk from the former Yugoslavia. He is a youth international for Turkey, having represented the Turkey U17s and U19s.

He was called up to the Turkey national football team for the first time in September 2023 for a friendly against Japan, but remained on the bench in the game. He opted to represent North Macedonia internationally on 2 July 2026.

== Career statistics ==
As of match played 24 May 2025

Appearances and goals by club, season and competition
Club	Season	League			Cup		Europe		Other		Total	
Club	Season	Division	Apps	Goals	Apps	Goals	Apps	Goals	Apps	Goals	Apps	Goals
Altay	2019–20	TFF First League	1	0	0	0	—		—		1	0
Altay	2020–21	TFF First League	6	1	0	0	—		—		6	1
Altay	2021–22	Süper Lig	23	0	2	0	—		—		25	0
Altay	Total		30	1	2	0	—		—		32	1
Galatasaray	2022–23	Süper Lig	11	0	1	0	0	0	0	0	12	0
Galatasaray	2023–24	Süper Lig	8	0	2	0	2 (Note: Appearances in UEFA Champions League)	0	0	0	12	0
Galatasaray	Total		19	0	3	0	2	0	0	0	24	0
Ankaragücü (loan)	2023–24	Süper Lig	11	0	1	0	—		—		12	0
Orenburg (loan)	2024–25	Russian Premier League	18	1	4	0	—		—		22	1
Career total			78	2	10	0	2	0	0	0	90	2

== Honours ==
Galatasaray

- Süper Lig: 2022–23
