= Emin Bayram =

Turkish footballer (born 2003)

Personal information
- Date of birth: 2 April 2003 (age 23)
- Place of birth: Istanbul, Turkey
- Height: 1.92 m (6 ft 4 in)
- Position: Centre back

Team information
- Current team: Başakşehir
- Number: 23

Youth career
- 2013–2019: Galatasaray

Senior career*
Years	Team	Apps	(Gls)
2019–2024	Galatasaray	13	(0)
2021–2022	→ Boluspor (loan)	39	(2)
2023–2024	→ Westerlo (loan)	23	(1)
2024–2026	Westerlo	69	(5)
2026–	Başakşehir	1	(0)

International career^{‡}
2017	Turkey U15	6	(2)
2018–2019	Turkey U16	16	(1)
2019	Turkey U17	11	(2)
2020–2022	Turkey U19	10	(1)
2022–2024	Turkey U21	13	(2)
- * Club domestic league appearances and goals as of 16 August 2026 ‡ National team caps and goals as of 15 October 2024

Emin Bayram (born 2 April 2003) is a Turkish professional footballer who plays as a centre back for Süper Lig club Başakşehir.

== Club career ==
=== Galatasaray ===
He played his first match with Galatasaray on 4 December 2019, in the Tuzlaspor match in the Turkish Cup. Although Galatasaray lost 0–2, Bayram was admired for his performance. For the next few UEFA Champions League games, he waited in the booth.

He played his first league match with Galatasaray on 26 January 2020, away from Konyaspor. Bayram, who was included in the game in the extra time, ended the match before he could play much.

On 12 July 2020, Bayram became the youngest Galatasaray captain ever in a Süper Lig match against Ankaragücü.

==== Boluspor (loan) ====
On 1 February 2021, Bayram signed a loan agreement with the TFF First League team Boluspor. On 12 July 2021, Boluspor, one of the TFF First League teams, hired young defender Bayram from Galatasaray. Bayram, who was loaned to Boluspor at halftime last season, played 10 games in a red-white jersey. The 18-year-old player took the road to the Black Sea team again.

==== Return to Galatasaray ====
Bayram became the champion in the Süper Lig in the 2022–23 season with the Galatasaray team. Defeating Ankaragücü 4–1 away in the match played in the 36th week on 30 May 2023, Galatasaray secured the lead with 2 weeks before the end and won the 23rd championship in its history.

==== Westerlo (loan) ====
On 6 September 2023, Bayram signed for Westerlo on a season-long loan.

=== Westerlo ===
On 30 July 2024, Galatasaray announced that Bayram was transferred to the Belgian representative Westerlo team for a transfer fee of €4,000.000.

=== Başakşehir ===
On 10 July 2026, Bayram returned to Turkey and signed a four-year contract with Başakşehir.

== Career statistics ==
As of match played on 7 October 2023

Club statistics
Club	Season	League			National Cup		Other		Total	
Club	Season	Division	Apps	Goals	Apps	Goals	Apps	Goals	Apps	Goals
Galatasaray	2019–20	Süper Lig	4	0	1	0	—		5	0
Galatasaray	2020–21	Süper Lig	2	0	1	0	—		3	0
Galatasaray	2022–23	Süper Lig	7	0	4	0	0	0	11	0
Galatasaray	2023–24	Süper Lig	0	0	0	0	1 (Note: Appearance in the UEFA Champions League)	0	1	0
Total		13	0	6	0	1	0	20	0	
Boluspor (loan)	2020–21	TFF First League	10	0	0	0	—		10	0
Boluspor (loan)	2021–22	TFF First League	29	2	1	0	—		30	2
Boluspor (loan)	Total		39	2	1	0	0	0	40	2
Westerlo (loan)	2023–24	Belgian Pro League	23	1	1	0	—		24	1
Westerlo	2024–25	Belgian Pro League	8	1	0	0	—		8	1
Westerlo	Total		31	2	1	0	0	0	32	2
Career totals			83	4	8	0	1	0	92	4

== Honours ==
Galatasaray

- Süper Lig: 2022–23
