= Bağlarçeşme Historical Fountain =

- Tarihi Bağlar Çeşmesi (Turkish)
- Bağlarçeşme Historical Fountain in 2026
- Subject: Unknown
- Location: Istanbul, Turkey

Bağlarçeşme Historical Fountain, It is a historical fountain located in the Bağlarçeşme neighborhood of Esenyurt district in Istanbul. It is said that the fountain gave its name to the neighborhood in which it is located.

== Restoration ==
In 2021, the then Mayor of Esenyurt, Kemal Deniz Bozkurt, stated that the fountain would be restored. It was placed under protection by the Istanbul Metropolitan Municipality Cultural Heritage Department in 2022. Its restoration was completed in January 2023, and the fountain, which was in a dilapidated state, is now functioning again.
