= Danamandıra =

- Neighbourhood
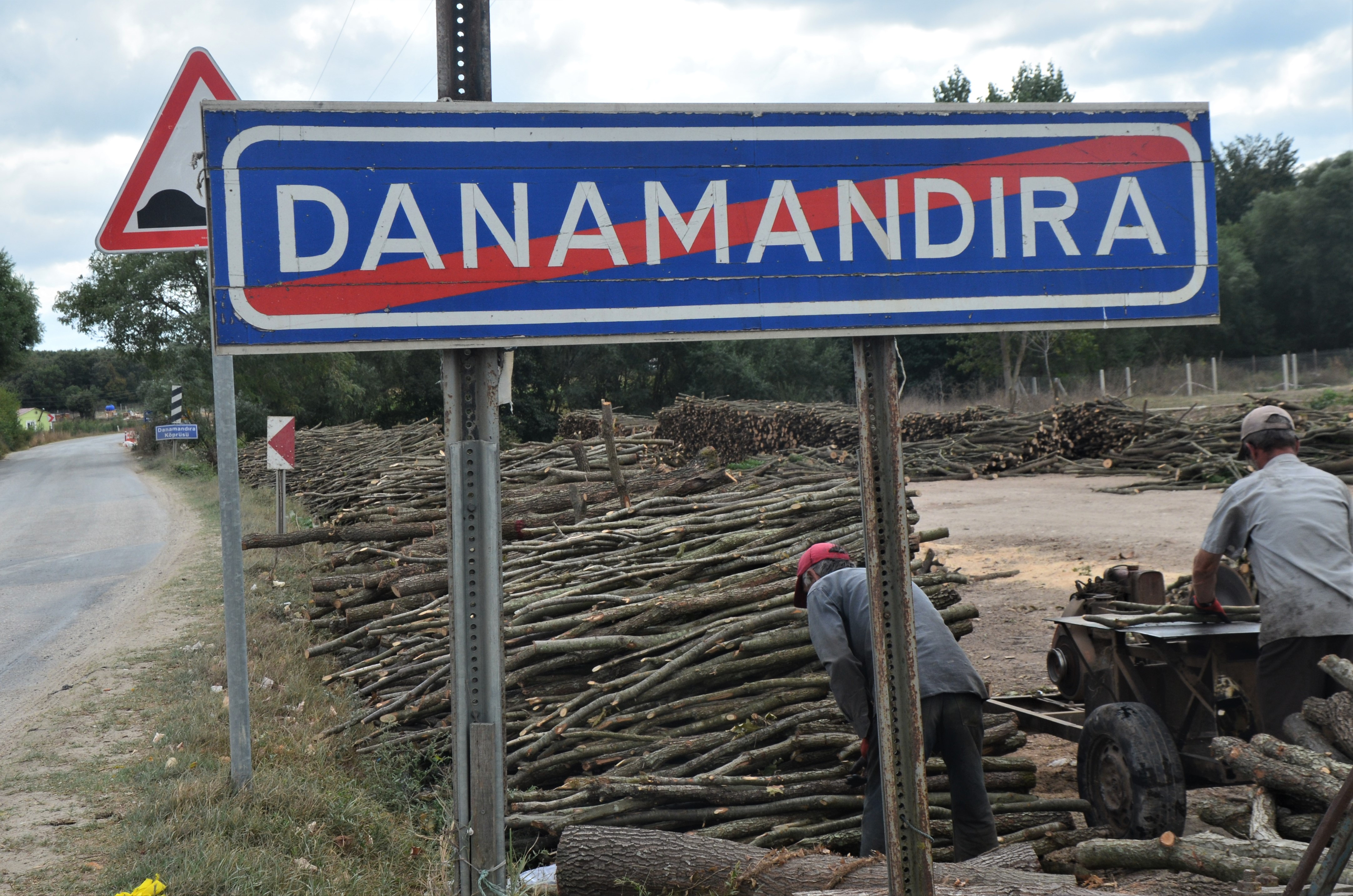
- Place name sign at city limit of Danamandıra

- Location within Turkey Location within Istanbul
- Coordinates: 41°18′28″N 28°14′37″E
- Country: Turkey
- Province: Istanbul
- District: Silivri
- Population (2022): 1,086
- Time zone: UTC+3 (TRT)
- Postal code: 34582
- Area code: 0212

Danamandıra is a neighbourhood in the municipality and district of Silivri, Istanbul Province, Turkey. Its population is 1,086 (2022). The village's name is a compound of the words "Dana" for calf and "mandıra" for dairy farm.

== History ==
Archaeological surveys were carried out by three domestic and two foreign universities between 2007 and 2016, in the forest area called "Aylapınarı" east of the village, where a cave, some tumuli, ancient quarries, remains of rock carvings and a monumental water structure point to a cult center. These revealed that the site was settled in the Late Neolithic and Chalcolithic periods, as well as in the Iron Age. The site was registered as first-grade archaeological protected area.

According to Nadir Tuna, an emigrant from Danamandıra, the local residents immigrated from a village in Razgrad Province, which was then part of the Ottoman Empire and now in Bulgaria, during the Russo-Turkish War (1877–1878), upon orders of the Ottoman Sultan Abdul Hamid II (r. 1876–1909). The immigrants settled in Danamandıra in 1882 by permission of the Sultan, after living temporarily in Çerkezköy and Ramis region.

== Geography ==
Being the farthermost settlement of the district, the distance of Danamandıra to Silivri is 35 km (22 mi), and it is 80 km (50 mi) far from Istanbul city. Danamandıra neighbors Karamandere in the north, Gümüşpınar and Kurfallı in the east, Küçük Sinekli and Büyük Sinekli in the south, and Sayalar and Aydınlar in the west.

== Population ==
Historical population
Year	Pop.	±% p.a.
2013	1,141	—
2017	1,109	−0.71%
2022	1,086	−0.42%
Source: TÜIK (2013-2022)

== Economy ==
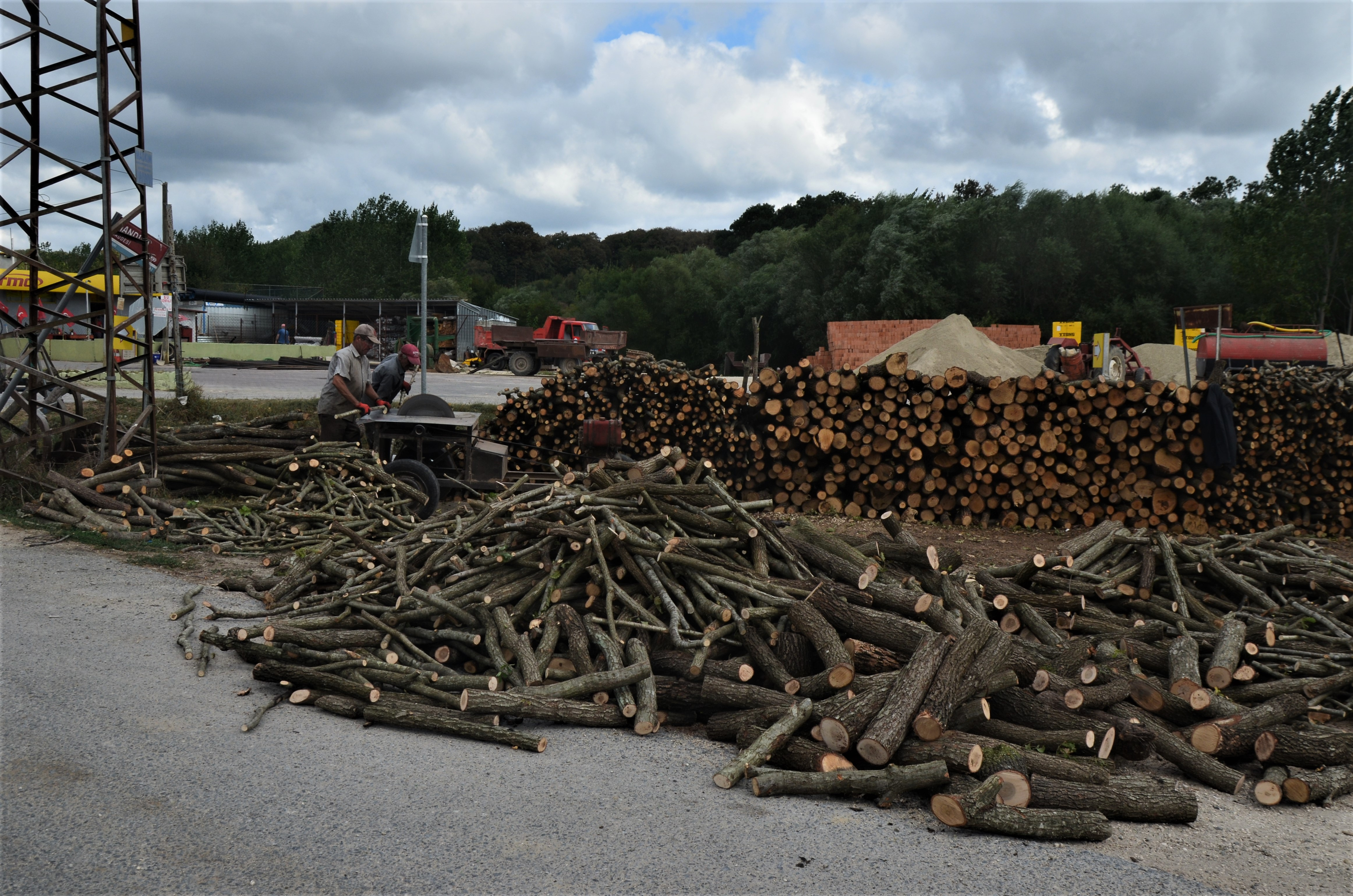
Firewood preparing in Damandıra.

The main economy of the village is agriculture, animal husbandry and forestry. The arable land area of the village stretching over 3,500 daa (3.5 km^{2}; 1.4 sq mi) is less than in the surrounding villages. There is a yogurt dairy and a cheese dairy in the village. The dairy products are sold even to high-class hotels. As of 2007, there were 671 dairy cattle (dairy cows and buffalos) and 251 sheep as livestock. In addition to diverse vegetables to meet the needs of the villagers, plants such as common bean, wheat and corn are grown. A coppiced forest of mostly oak trees covering 3,700 ha (9,100 acres) provides firewood and trade goods for the villagers. Charcoal produced by pyrolysis process of oak wood from Danamandıra forests is considered a high-quality product for barbecue.

== Recreation ==
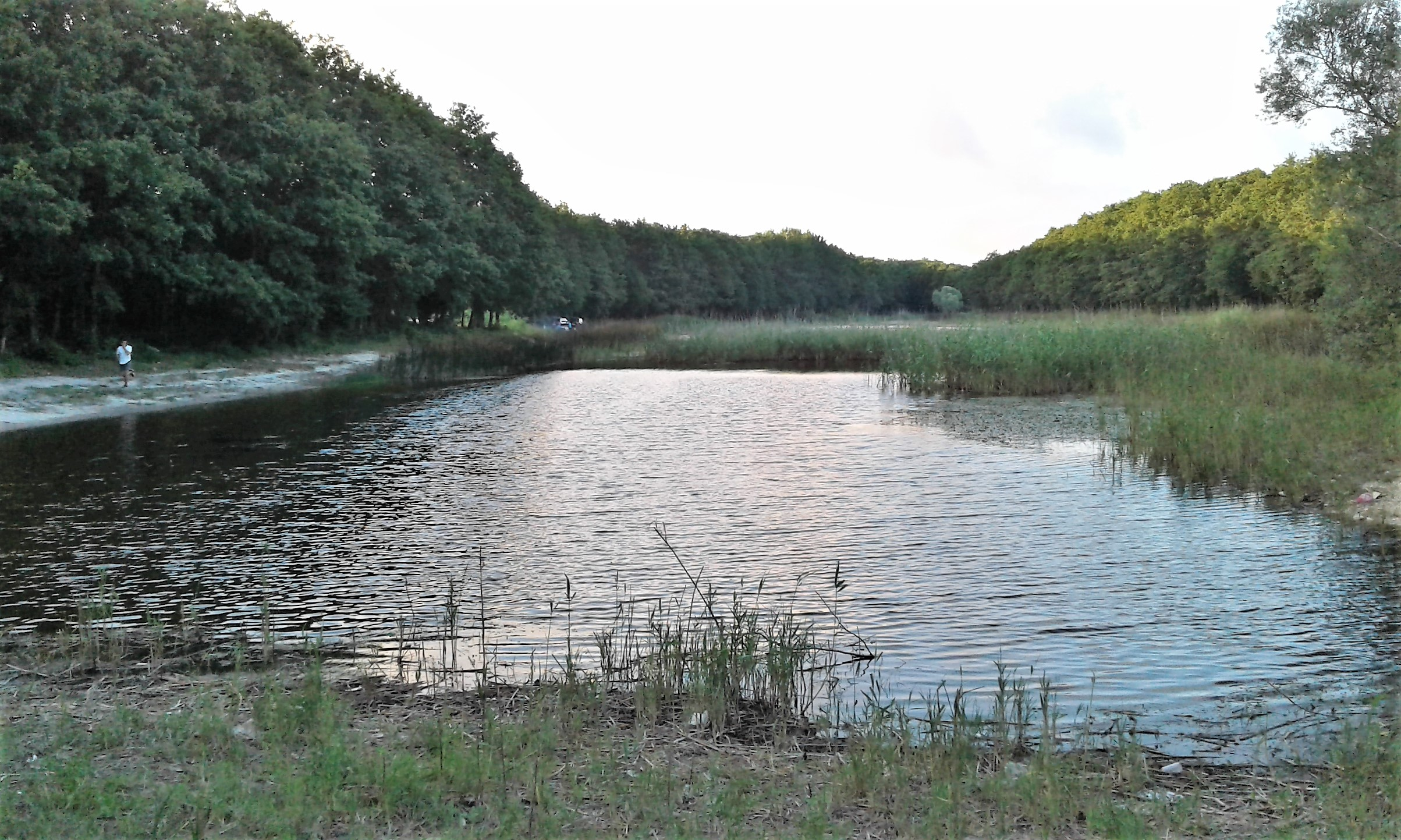
A view from the Danamandıra Nature Park.

The forest area with three lakes located southwest of the village was registered in 2006 as a protected area for conservation of nature. The recreational area became Danamandıra Nature Park in 2015.

== Events ==
The Turkish Foundation for Combating Soil Erosion (TEMA) organizes an acorn picking festival in the forest as part of its Oak Project in November.
