= Balıkyolu =

Neighborhood in Esenyurt district, Istanbul, Turkey

Balıkyolu is a neighborhood in the Esenyurt District on the European side of Istanbul, Turkey.

== Location ==
It is bordered on the north and east by the Avcılar District neighborhood of Yeşilkent, on the southeast by the Esenyurt neighborhood of Yunus Emre, on the south by the Esenyurt neighborhood of İnönü, and on the west by the Esenyurt neighborhoods of Sultaniye and Süleymaniye.

== Name ==
Balıkyolu means literally "fish way" (Turkish: balık + yol).

== Demographics ==
Its population is 28,458 (2018), and its surface area is 0.564437 square kilometers.

The neighborhood is home to many Romani people and to many Alevis. Many Syrians also live in the neighborhood (as of 2022).
