= Mehterçeşme =

Neighborhood in Esenyurt district, Istanbul, Turkey

Mehterçeşme is a neighborhood in the Esenyurt District, on the European side of Istanbul, Turkey.

Its population is 36,880 (2018). Its surface area is 0.60461 square kilometers. The neighborhood has had one of the fastest-growing populations in the area.

It is bordered on the northeast by the Talatpaşa neighborhood, on the southeast by the Mehmet Akif Ersoy neighborhood, on the southwest by the Mevlana and Cumhuriyet neighborhoods, and on the northwest by the Yeşilkent neighborhood.

== Name ==
Mehterçeşme means literally "military musician fountain" (Turkish: mehter + çeşme). The name is said to come from a historic fountain in the area.
