= Danamandıra Nature Park =

Nature park in Istanbul

- Danamandıra Tabiat Parkı
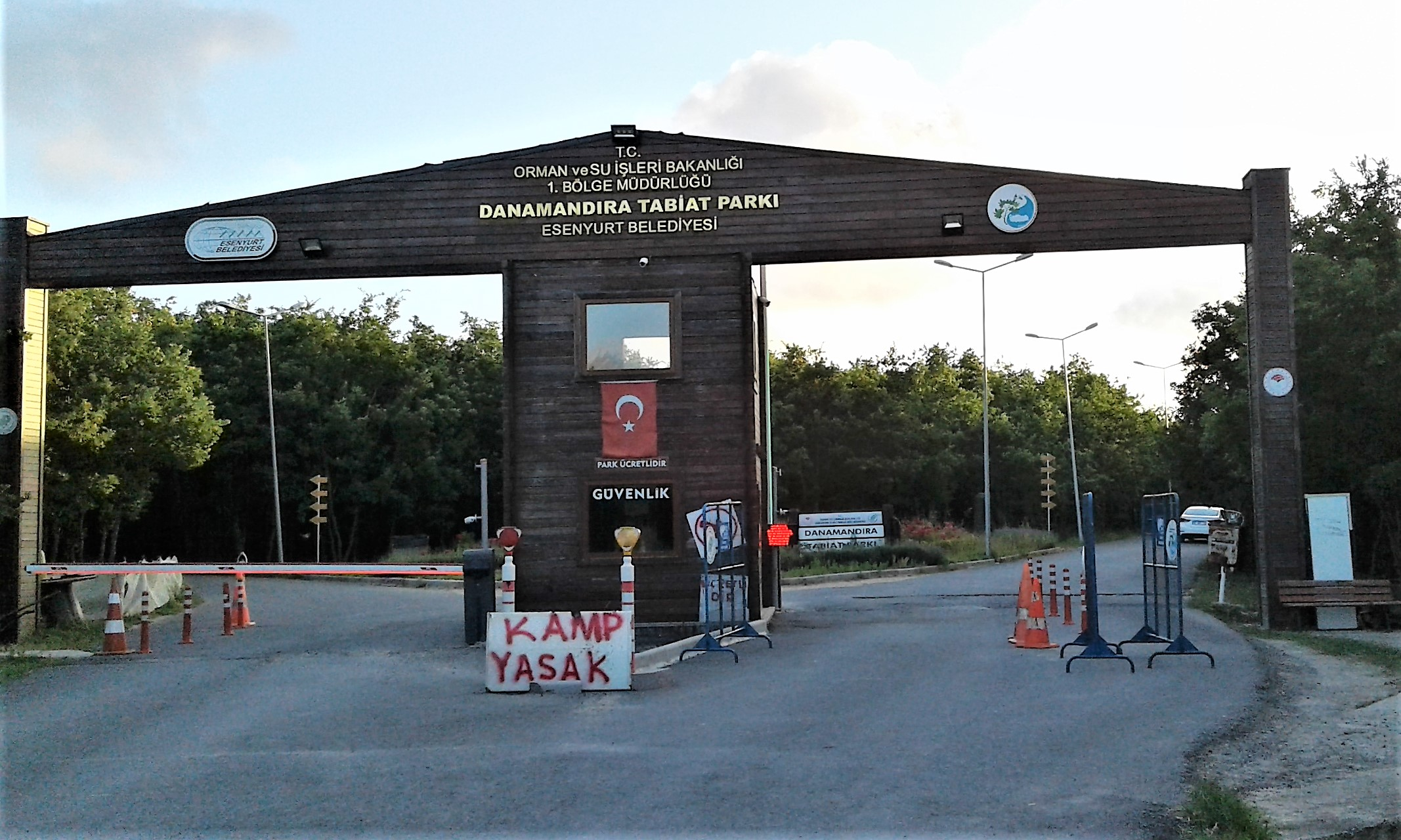
- Entrance of Danamandıra Nature Park.

- Location within Istanbul
- Location: Danamandıra, Silivri, Istanbul Province, Turkey
- Coordinates: 41°18′13″N 28°13′17″E
- Area: 381.09 ha (941.7 acres)
- Established: 16 December 2015; 10 years ago
- Governing body: Directorate-General of Nature Protection and National Parks; Ministry of Agriculture and Forestry
- Operator: Municipality of Esenyurt

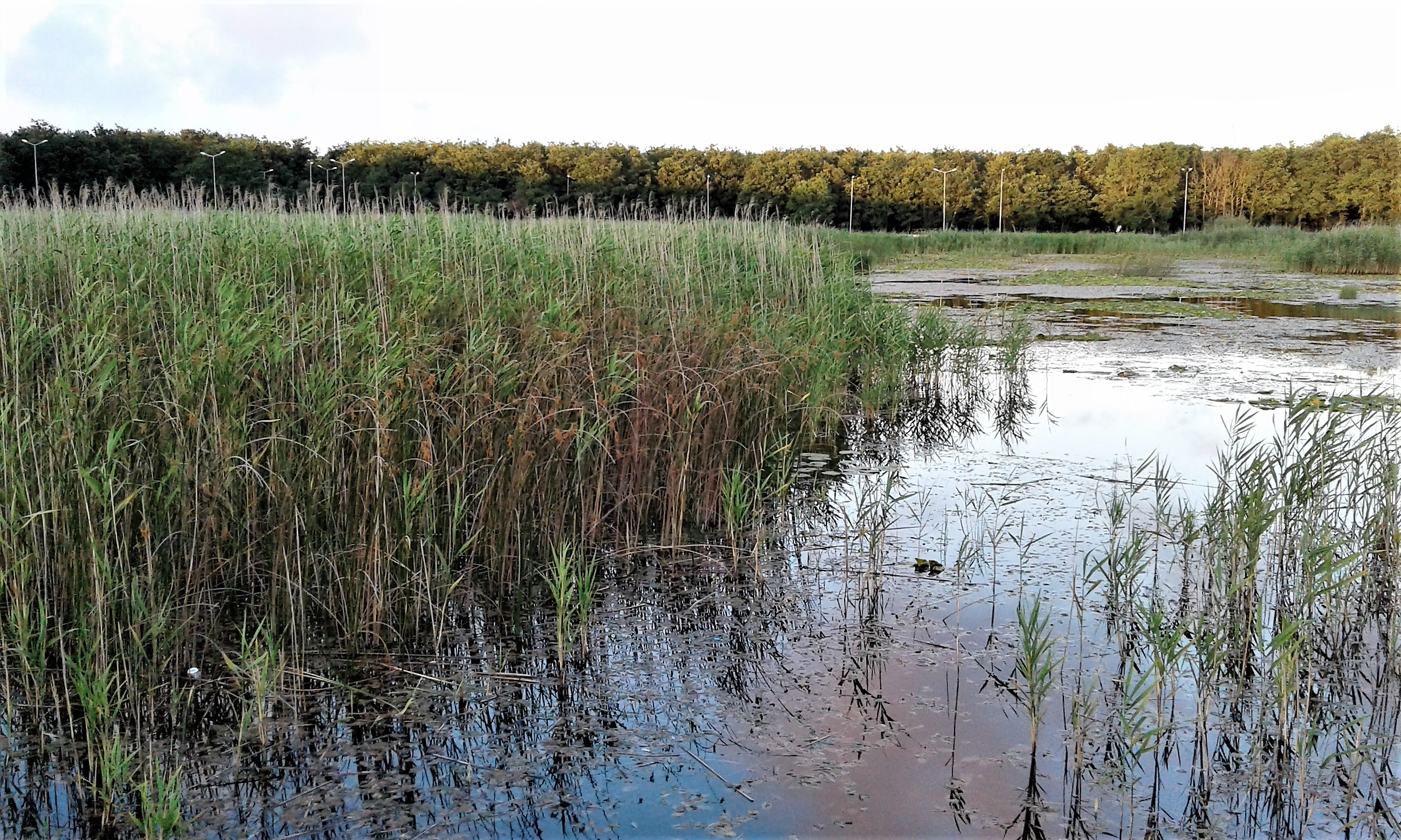
A view of the lake in the Nature Park.

Danamandıra Nature Park (Turkish: Danamandıra Tabiat Parkı) is a nature park in Silivri district of Istanbul Province, Turkey.

The forest area with lakes in it located just southwest of Danamandıra village in Silivri district in the European side of Istanbul Province was registered in 2006 as a protected area for the conservation of nature. On 16 December 2015, the recreational area was established as a nature park featuring three lakes, with reed covered shore.

In 2016, the nature park was leased by the municipality of the neighboring district Esenyurt for 49 years in order to provide a recreation area for its residents, who live in a crowded district. The opening took place in mid May that year.

A fee for vehicles is charged at the park entrance.
