= Bağlarçeşme =

Neighborhood in Esenyurt district, Istanbul, Turkey

Bağlarçeşme is a neighborhood in the Esenyurt District on the European side of Istanbul, Turkey.

Its population is 29,117 (2018), and its surface area is 0.610196 square kilometers.

It is bordered on the northeast corner by the Ardıçlı neighborhood, on the east by the Yenikent neighborhood, on the southeast corner by the Sultaniye neighborhood, on the south by the Fatih neighborhood, on the west by the Pınar neighborhood, and on the northwest by the Çınar and Örnek neighborhoods.

== Name ==
Bağlarçeşme means literally "vineyards fountain" (Turkish: bağ (plural) + çeşme). The name is said to come from a Bağlarçeşme Historical Fountain in the area.

== Demographics ==
The neighborhood is home to many Romani people. The neighborhood also has a large population of Syrians (as of 2021-2024), to the extent that it is known as Küçük Suriye ("Little Syria") and its main street is known as Suriye Caddesi (Syria Avenue) or Şam Sokağı (Damascus Street).
