= Istanbul Esenyurt Universty =

Istanbul Esenyurt University is a foundation university established in Istanbul in 2013 by the Yeşilköy 2001 Education, Health, Culture Foundation. The university's main campus is located in the Esenyurt district. The language of instruction is Turkish and English.

== History ==
The university was established by the Yeşilköy 2001 Education, Culture and Health Foundation on June 18, 2013, in accordance with the provisions of the Turkish Constitution, Law No. 2547 on Higher Education, and the Regulation on Foundation Higher Education Institutions, by Law No. 6492 published in the Resmi Gazete No. 28681. The university began its educational life in the fall semester of the 2013–2014 academic year, admitting 296 students through the supplementary placement system in 6 departments and 8 programs.

== Management ==
The university's rector is Süleyman Özdemir.

== Campuses ==
=== Esenyurt Campus ===
The appearance of Istanbul Esenyurt University's Esenyurt Campus in 2026.

The Esenyurt Campus is located on Adile Naşit Boulevard in the Zafer neighborhood of Esenyurt.

=== Gümüşyaka Campus ===
Gümüşyaka Campus is located on the side road of 13th Street in Silivri district of Istanbul.

=== Radio TV & Physical Education Campus ===
The Radio, Television & Physical Education and Sports Campus is located on 1674th Street in the Koza neighborhood of Esenyurt.
