= Ahmet Özer =

Turkish academic and politician

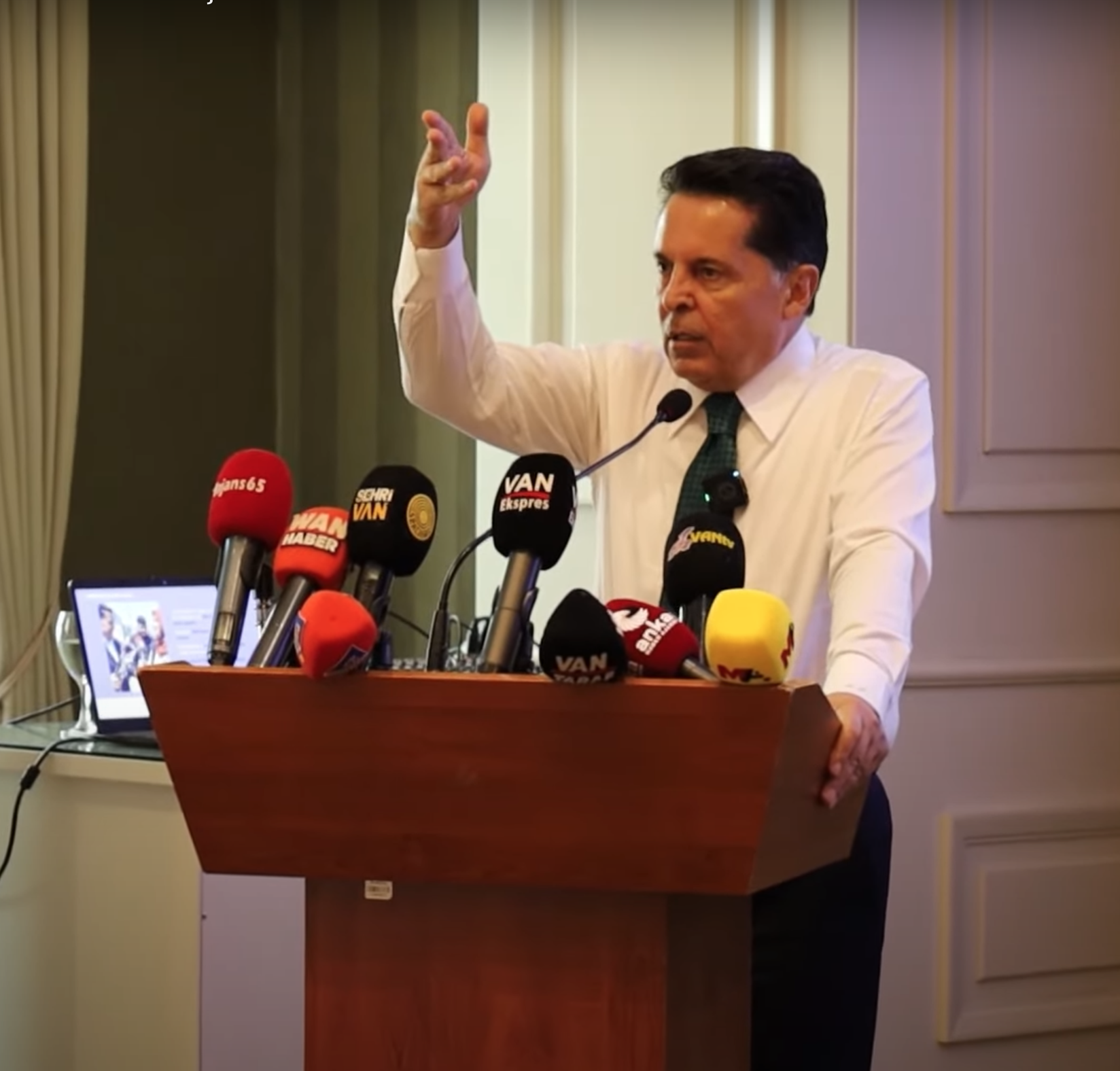

Mayor of Esenyurt
- Preceded by: Kemal Deniz Bozkurt
- Succeeded by: Can Aksoy

Personal details
- Born: 1960 (age 65–66) Muradiye, Van, Turkey
- Party: New Democracy Movement (1994-1996); Democratic People's Party (2002); Social Democratic People's Party (2004); Peoples' Democratic Party (2015); Republican People's Party (2011, 2023-2026); New Party (2026-present)

Ahmet Özer (born 1960, Van) is a Turkish academic and politician.

He is of Kurdish origin and was among the founders of the New Democracy Movement, which was active in the 1990s. In the 2024 Local Elections, he was elected mayor of Esenyurt, a district in Istanbul. However, following his arrest on charges of "being a member of an armed terrorist organization," he was temporarily removed from office by a decision of the Ministry of the Interior.
