= Hamza Akman =

Turkish footballer (born 2004)

Personal information
- Full name: Hamza Yiğit Akman
- Date of birth: 27 September 2004 (age 22)
- Place of birth: Şişli, Istanbul, Turkey
- Height: 1.70 m (5 ft 7 in)
- Position: Midfielder

Team information
- Current team: Eyüpspor
- Number: 18

Youth career
- 2014–2022: Galatasaray

Senior career*
| Years | Team | Apps | (Gls) |
| 2022–2024 | Galatasaray | 1 | (0) |
| 2024 | Sønderjyske | 0 | (0) |
| 2025– | Eyüpspor | 16 | (0) |
| 2025–2026 | → Pendikspor (loan) | 20 | (2) |

International career^{‡}
| 2019–2020 | Turkey U-16 | 8 | (0) |
| 2021–2022 | Turkey U-18 | 4 | (0) |
| 2022–2023 | Turkey U-19 | 6 | (2) |
| 2025– | Turkey U-21 | 2 | (0) |
- * Club domestic league appearances and goals as of 17 October 2026 ‡ National team caps and goals as of 3 June 2026

Hamza Yiğit Akman (born 27 September 2004) is a Turkish professional footballer who plays as a midfielder for Süper Lig club Eyüpspor. Akman represented Turkey at youth levels, latest at U21 level.

== Club career ==
=== Galatasaray ===
Akman contributed Galatasaray U19 squad with 8 goals and 6 assists at 2020–21 TFF U-19 Süper Lig, the youth development league governed by TFF, in which Galatasaray eventually won. On 8 September 2021, Galatasaray announced professional contract signing with Akman, effective until the end of 2023–24 season. Akman made his Süper Lig debut on 13 August 2022, Saturday, coming from bench on 82nd minute in match week 2 encounter against Giresunspor, in which Galatasaray lost at home 0–1.

Akman became the champion in the Süper Lig in the 2022–23 season with the Galatasaray team. Defeating Ankaragücü 4-1 away in the match played in the 36th week on 30 May 2023, Galatasaray secured the lead with 2 weeks before the end and won the 23rd championship in its history.

=== Sønderjyske ===
On 1 August 2024, Akman joined Danish Superliga club Sønderjyske on a three-year contract. On 1 November, Akman left by mutual consent.

=== Eyüpspor ===
In December 2024, Akman signed with Eyüpspor.

== Personal life ==
Hamza Akman is the son of former Turkish international footballer Ayhan Akman. His brother Efe plays at Galatasaray S.K. Football Academy as of 2022. Turkish youth international Ali Akman is his cousin.

== Career statistics ==
=== Club ===
As of 14 August 2022

Appearances and goals by club, season and competition
| Club | Season | League | | | Cup (Note: Includes Turkish Cup) | | Continental (Note: Includes UEFA Champions League and UEFA Europa League.) | | Other (Note: Includes Turkish Super Cup.) | | Total | |
| Club | Season | Division | Apps | Goals | Apps | Goals | Apps | Goals | Apps | Goals | Apps | Goals |
|---|---|---|---|---|---|---|---|---|---|---|---|---|
| Galatasaray | 2022–23 | Süper Lig | 1 | 0 | 1 | 1 | 0 | 0 | 0 | 0 | 2 | 1 |
| Career total | | | 1 | 0 | 1 | 1 | 0 | 0 | 0 | 0 | 2 | 1 |

== Honours ==
Galatasaray

- TFF U19 Süper Lig: 2020–21
- Süper Lig: 2022–23
