= Can Okuyucu =

Turkish association football coach and former player

Personal information
- Full name: Can Okuyucu
- Date of birth: 12 June 1968 (age 58)
- Place of birth: İzmir, Turkey
- Position: Goalkeeper

Team information
- Current team: Galatasaray (goalkeeping coach)

Senior career*
Years	Team	Apps	(Gls)
1988–1990	Kuşadasıspor		
1990–1992	Göztepe S.K.		
1992–1994	Fenerbahçe S.K.		
1993–1994	Balıkesirspor		
1994–1995	Bakırköyspor		
1996–2000	Kuşadasıspor		
2000–2001	Cizrespor		
2001–2002	Körfez Belediye		

Managerial career
- 2003: Muğlaspor (goalkeeping coach)
- 2003–2004: Bursaspor (goalkeeping coach)
- 2004–2005: Diyarbakırspor (goalkeeping coach)
- 2005–2006: Malatyaspor (goalkeeping coach)
- 2006: Karşıyaka (goalkeeping coach)
- 2007: Mardinspor (goalkeeping coach)
- 2007–2009: Altay (goalkeeping coach)
- 2013–2014: Altay (goalkeeping coach)
- 2015: Yeni Malatyaspor (goalkeeping coach)
- 2015–2016: Sivasspor (goalkeeping coach)
- 2016–2017: Göztepe (goalkeeping coach)
- 2017–2018: Akhisar Belediyespor (goalkeeping coach)
- 2018–2019: Çaykur Rizespor (goalkeeping coach)
- 2019–2021: İstanbul Başakşehir (goalkeeping coach)
- 2022–: Galatasaray (goalkeeping coach)
- * Club domestic league appearances and goals

Can Okuyucu (born 12 June 1968) is a Turkish association football coach and former player.

== Coaching career ==
He has been working as a Goalkeeper coach in head coach Okan Buruk team since 2015.

Since the 2022–23 season, Galatasaray coach Okan Buruk has been working as a goalkeeper coach in a team.

== Honours ==
=== Coach ===
Akhisarspor

- Turkish Cup: 2017–18

İstanbul Başakşehir

- Süper Lig: 2019–20

Galatasaray

- Süper Lig: 2022–23, 2023–24, 2024–25, 2025–26
- Turkish Cup: 2024–25
- Turkish Super Cup: 2023
