= Turkey national under-21 football team =

National under-21 association football team representing Turkey

Turkey Under-21
- Nickname(s): Ümit Millî (The Youth Team); Ay-Yıldızlılar (The Crescent-Stars); Bizim Çocuklar (Our Guys)
- Association: Turkish Football Federation (TFF)
- Confederation: UEFA (Europe)
- Head coach: Egemen Korkmaz
- Captain: Doğan Alemdar
- Most caps: Nihat Kahveci (32)
- Top scorer: Berkant Göktan (11)
First colours	Second colours

First international
- Turkey 3–1 Egypt (Ankara; 28 October 1950)

Biggest win
- Turkey 5–0 Austria (Istanbul; 15 November 1983)

Biggest defeat
- Germany 7–0 Turkey (Berlin; 25 October 1983)

UEFA U-21 Championship
- Appearances: 1 (first in 2000)
- Best result: Group stage

The Turkey national Under-21 football team (Turkish: Ümit Millî Futbol Takımı), also known as Turkey Under-21s or Turkey U-21s, is the Under-21 years of age team of the Turkey national football team.

== History ==
This team is for Turkish players aged 21 or under at the start of a two-year UEFA European Under-21 Championship campaign, so players can be, and often are, up to 23 years old. Also in existence are teams for Under-20s (for non-UEFA tournaments), Under-19s and Under 17s. As long as they are eligible, players can play at any level, making it possible to play for the U-21s, senior side and again for the U-21s, as Oğuzhan Özyakup has done recently. It is also possible to play for one country at youth level and another at senior level (providing the player is eligible).

== Competitive Record ==
=== Summer Olympics record ===
Olympic Games record
Year	Host	Round	Pos.	Pld.	W	D	L	GF	GA
1992	(Spain) Barcelona	did not qualify							
1996	(United States) Atlanta	did not qualify							
2000	(Australia) Sydney	did not qualify							
2004	(Greece) Athens	did not qualify							
2008	(China) Beijing	did not qualify							
2012	(United Kingdom) London	did not qualify							
2016	(Brazil) Rio de Janeiro	did not qualify							
2020	(Japan) Tokyo	did not qualify							
2024	(France) Paris	did not qualify							
Total			0/9	0	0	0	0	0	0

=== UEFA European Under-21 Championship Record ===
Edition	Round	M	W	D	L	GF	GA	GD
No host 1978	did not qualify							
No host 1980	did not qualify							
No host 1982	did not qualify							
No host 1984	did not qualify							
No host 1986	did not qualify							
No host 1988	did not qualify							
No host 1990	did not qualify							
No host 1992	did not qualify							
(France) 1994	did not qualify							
(Spain) 1996	did not qualify							
(Romania) 1998	did not qualify							
(Slovakia) 2000	Group stage	3	0	0	3	2	11	-9
(Switzerland) 2002	did not qualify							
(Germany) 2004	did not qualify							
(Portugal) 2006	did not qualify							
(Netherlands) 2007	did not qualify							
(Sweden) 2009	did not qualify							
(Denmark) 2011	did not qualify							
(Israel) 2013	did not qualify							
(Czech Republic) 2015	did not qualify							
(Poland) 2017	did not qualify							
(Italy) (San Marino) 2019	did not qualify							
(Hungary) (Slovenia) 2021	did not qualify							
(Romania) (Georgia (country)) 2023	did not qualify							
(Slovakia) 2025	did not qualify							
(Albania) (Serbia) 2027	To be determined							
Total:1/25	Group stage	3	0	0	3	2	11	-9

=== UEFA Under-23 Qualification ===
#	Year	M	W	D	L	GF	GA	GD
1	1972 UEFA European Under-23 Championship	6	0	3	3	0	8	-8
2	1974 UEFA European Under-23 Championship	2	0	0	2	1	4	-3
3	1976 UEFA European Under-23 Championship	2	1	0	1	2	4	-2
Total	3/3	10	1	3	6	3	16	-13

=== UEFA Under-21 Qualification ===
As of 2025

#	Year	M	W	D	L	GF	GA	GD
1	1978 UEFA European Under-21 Championship	4	1	2	1	5	8	-3
2	1980 UEFA European Under-21 Championship	4	1	0	3	2	11	-9
3	1982 UEFA European Under-21 Championship	4	1	1	2	2	5	-3
4	1984 UEFA European Under-21 Championship	6	1	1	4	6	11	-5
5	1986 UEFA European Under-21 Championship	6	0	4	2	3	7	-4
6	1988 UEFA European Under-21 Championship	4	1	2	1	4	6	-2
7	1990 UEFA European Under-21 Championship	6	1	2	3	4	11	-7
8	1992 UEFA European Under-21 Championship	6	1	1	4	6	11	-5
9	1994 UEFA European Under-21 Championship qualification	10	6	2	2	15	10	+5
10	1996 UEFA European Under-21 Championship qualification	8	4	2	2	13	12	+1
11	1998 UEFA European Under-21 Championship qualification	8	5	0	3	16	8	+8
12	2000 UEFA European Under-21 Championship qualification	8	4	4	0	11	4	+7
13	2002 UEFA European Under-21 Championship qualification	12	8	2	2	21	10	+11
14	2004 UEFA European Under-21 Championship qualification	10	7	2	1	19	7	+12
15	2006 UEFA European Under-21 Championship qualification	12	5	4	3	15	9	+6
16	2007 UEFA European Under-21 Championship qualification	2	0	2	0	0	0	0
17	2009 UEFA European Under-21 Championship qualification	10	7	1	2	19	8	+11
18	2011 UEFA European Under-21 Championship qualification	10	5	1	4	13	11	+2
19	2013 UEFA European Under-21 Championship qualification	8	5	0	3	13	7	+6
20	2015 UEFA European Under-21 Championship qualification	8	4	1	3	16	11	+5
21	2017 UEFA European Under-21 Championship qualification	8	3	2	3	7	8	-1
22	2019 UEFA European Under-21 Championship qualification	10	5	2	3	14	10	+4
23	2021 UEFA European Under-21 Championship qualification	10	4	1	5	15	18	-3
24	2023 UEFA European Under-21 Championship qualification	8	2	2	4	7	11	-4
25	2025 UEFA European Under-21 Championship qualification	10	4	1	5	21	15	+6
26	2027 UEFA European Under-21 Championship qualification	0	0	0	0	0	0	0
Total	26/26	192	85	42	65	267	219	+48

=== Toulon Tournament ===
- 2002 Toulon Tournament - 8th place
- 2004 Toulon Tournament - 7th place
- 2008 Toulon Tournament - 6th place
- 2012 Toulon Tournament - 2nd place
- 2018 Toulon Tournament - 3rd place

== Results and fixtures ==
Win Draw Loss

== Players ==
=== Current squad ===
Players born on or after 1 January 2004 are eligible for 2027 UEFA European Under-21 Championship qualifying games.

The following players were called up for the 2027 UEFA European Under-21 Championship qualification Group H matches against Ukraine and Hungary on 26 September and 6 October 2026; respectively.

Caps and goals updated as of 6 October 2026, after the match against Hungary.

No.	Pos.	Player	Date of birth (age)	Caps	Goals	Club
1	GK	Deniz Ertaş	20 March 2005 (age 21)	6	0	(Turkish Football Federation) Konyaspor
12	GK	Serhat Öztaşdelen	9 December 2004 (age 21)	1	0	(Turkish Football Federation) Kocaelispor
23	GK	Jankat Yılmaz	16 August 2004 (age 22)	5	0	(Turkish Football Federation) Galatasaray
2	DF	Ayberk Karapo	25 July 2004 (age 22)	21	0	(Turkish Football Federation) Kasımpaşa
3	DF	Yasin Özcan	20 April 2006 (age 20)	21	0	(Turkish Football Federation) Beşiktaş
4	DF	Yiğit Efe Demir	2 August 2004 (age 22)	8	0	(Turkish Football Federation) Fenerbahçe
5	DF	Yusuf Akçiçek	25 January 2006 (age 20)	2	0	(Saudi Arabian Football Federation) Al Hilal
14	DF	Deniz Ofli	29 March 2007 (age 19)	3	0	(German Football Association) Karlsruher SC
15	DF	Hamza Güreler	10 April 2006 (age 20)	14	1	(Turkish Football Federation) İstanbul Başakşehir
22	DF	Mertcan Ayhan	8 September 2006 (age 20)	2	0	(German Football Association) Schalke 04
6	MF	Yunus Emre Konak	10 January 2006 (age 20)	17	0	(The Football Association) Lincoln City
8	MF	Baran Ali Gezek	26 August 2005 (age 21)	6	1	(Turkish Football Federation) Alanyaspor
13	MF	Emirhan Boz	12 February 2006 (age 20)	2	0	(Turkish Football Federation) Kasımpaşa
16	MF	İzzet Çelik	20 June 2004 (age 22)	10	1	(Turkish Football Federation) Alanyaspor
18	MF	Hamza Akman	27 September 2004 (age 22)	2	0	(Turkish Football Federation) Eyüpspor
20	MF	İsak Vural	28 May 2006 (age 20)	5	0	(Italian Football Federation) Pisa
21	MF	Emirhan Acar	25 July 2005 (age 21)	2	0	(Turkish Football Federation) Erzurumspor
	MF	Emirhan İlkhan	1 June 2004 (age 22)	12	3	(Italian Football Federation) Torino
7	FW	İlhan Fakılı	20 January 2006 (age 20)	2	0	(Turkish Football Federation) Beşiktaş
9	FW	Ali Habeșoğlu	29 July 2004 (age 22)	10	3	(Turkish Football Federation) Trabzonspor
10	FW	Poyraz Efe Yıldırım	15 January 2005 (age 21)	10	1	(Turkish Football Federation) Muğlaspor
11	FW	Arda Usluoğlu	12 October 2006 (age 20)	2	0	(Turkish Football Federation) Alanyaspor
17	FW	Melih Bostan	8 April 2004 (age 22)	8	0	(Turkish Football Federation) Ümraniyespor
19	FW	Arda Çolak	8 December 2004 (age 21)	2	0	(Turkish Football Federation) Iğdır

=== Recent call-ups ===
The following players have been called up for the team within the last 12 months and are still eligible to represent.

Pos.	Player	Date of birth (age)	Caps	Goals	Club	Latest call-up
GK	Deniz Dilmen	5 June 2005 (age 21)	1	0	(Turkey) Pendikspor	v. Kosovo 3 June 2026
GK	Onuralp Çevikkan	2 January 2006 (age 20)	1	0	(Turkey) Trabzonspor	v. Kosovo 3 June 2026
DF	Berkay Yılmaz	25 February 2005 (age 21)	8	0	(Germany) 1. FC Nürnberg	v. Kosovo 3 June 2026
DF	Yusuf Kocatürk	27 July 2004 (age 22)	0	0	(Turkey) Ümraniyespor	v. Kosovo 3 June 2026
MF	Eyüp Aydın	2 August 2004 (age 22)	9	0	(Turkey) Kasımpaşa	v. Kosovo 3 June 2026
MF	Emre Demir	15 January 2004 (age 22)	3	0	(Turkey) Sakaryaspor	v. Kosovo 3 June 2026
MF	Salih Malkoçoğlu	23 February 2005 (age 21)	1	1	(Turkey) Trabzonspor	v. Kosovo 3 June 2026
FW	Başar Önal	6 July 2004 (age 22)	8	1	(Netherlands) NEC Nijmegen	v. Kosovo 3 June 2026
FW	Livan Burcu	28 September 2004 (age 22)	7	1	(Germany) Union Berlin	v. Kosovo 3 June 2026
FW	Mustafa Erhan Hekimoğlu	22 April 2007 (age 19)	7	1	(Turkey) Beşiktaş	v. Kosovo 3 June 2026

- ^{SEN} = Player have been called up to the senior team.
- ^{INJ} = Not part of the current squad due to injury.

== Player records ==
As of 3 June 2024

=== Most appearances ===
The following is the top 10 most capped under-21 players:

Rank	Name	Period	Caps	Goals
1	Berkant Göktan	1998–2001	29	10
1	Kemal Aslan	2000–2003	29	5
3	Serkan Aykut	1994–1997	24	12
3	Erhan Albayrak	1998–2000	24	7
3	Nihat Kahveci	1998–2000	24	1
3	Feti Okuroğlu	1990–1993	24	0
7	Serhat Akın	2000–2002	23	12
7	Güngör Öztürk	1997–2000	23	2
9	Mehmet Topuz	2004–2005	22	2
9	Hüseyin Çimşir	1998–2001	22	1
9	Ravil Tagir	2019–present	22	1
9	Metin Uzun	1990–1995	22	1
9	Mehmet Nas	1998–2001	22	0
9	Şenol Yavaş	1992–1995	22	0

=== Top goalscorers ===
The following is the top 10 under-21 players goalscorers

Rank	Player	Period	Goals	Caps	Ratio
1	Serhat Akın	2000–2002	12	23	0.52
1	Serkan Aykut	1994–1997	12	24	0.5
3	Tuncay Şanlı	2002–2003	10	14	0.71
3	Berkant Göktan	1998–2001	10	29	0.34
5	Oktay Derelioğlu	1994–1997	9	14	0.64
6	Halil Dervişoğlu	2018-2020	8	11	0.73
7	Bertuğ Yıldırım	2022-2024	7	11	0.64
7	Erhan Albayrak	1998-2000	7	24	0.29
9	Semih Kılıçsoy	2024-present	6	9	0.67
9	Bülent Uygun	1992–1993	6	14	0.43
9	Mustafa Özkan	1996–1997	6	15	0.4
9	Emrah Başsan	2012-2015	6	17	0.35
9	Enis Destan	2021-2024	6	21	0.29
9	Semih Şentürk	2003-2005	6	21	0.29

== Former squads ==
- 2000 UEFA European Under-21 Football Championship squads – Turkey

== Former players ==
- Abdullah Ercan
- Alpay Özalan
- Arda Turan
- Arif Erdem
- Berkant Göktan
- Bülent Korkmaz
- Colin Kazim-Richards
- Emre Aşık
- Emre Belözoğlu
- Fatih Terim
- Gökhan Töre
- Gökhan Zan
- Hakan Şükür
- Halil Altıntop
- Mehmet Topal
- Mehmet Topuz
- Nihat Kahveci
- Necati Ateş
- Nuri Şahin
- Okan Buruk
- Saffet Sancaklı
- Semih Şentürk
- Sergen Yalçın
- Tuncay Şanlı
- Ümit Özat
- Volkan Demirel
- Yıldıray Baştürk

== Former Coaches ==
- 1957–1959: (Turkey) Şeref Görkey
- 1960–1962: (Turkey) Şeref Görkey
- 1976–1977: (Turkey) Candan Tarhan
- 1981–1982: (Turkey) Şeref Görkey
- 1984–1984: (Turkey) Yılmaz Gökdel
- 1990–1993: (Turkey) Fatih Terim
- 1993–1996: (Turkey) Erdoğan Arıca
- 1996–1998: (Turkey) Rıza Çalımbay
- 1998–2005: (Turkey) Raşit Çetiner
- 2005–2006: (Turkey) Reha Kapsal
- 2006–2006: (Turkey) Tolunay Kafkas
- 2006–2007: (Turkey) Ünal Karaman
- 2007–2008: (Turkey) Ümit Davala
- 2008–2010: (Turkey) Hami Mandıralı
- 2010–2012: (Turkey) Raşit Çetiner
- 2013–2018: (Turkey) Abdullah Ercan
- 2018–2018: (Turkey) Alpay Özalan
- 2018–2020: (Turkey) Vedat İnceefe
- 2020–2023: (Turkey) Tolunay Kafkas
- 2023–2024: (Turkey) Levent Sürme
- 2024–2025 (Turkey) Gökhan Gönül
- 2025–present (Turkey) Egemen Korkmaz

== See also ==
- Turkey national football team
- Turkey national under-20 football team
- Turkey national under-19 football team
- Turkey national under-17 football team
- Turkey national youth football team
