= Esenyurt =

- District and municipality
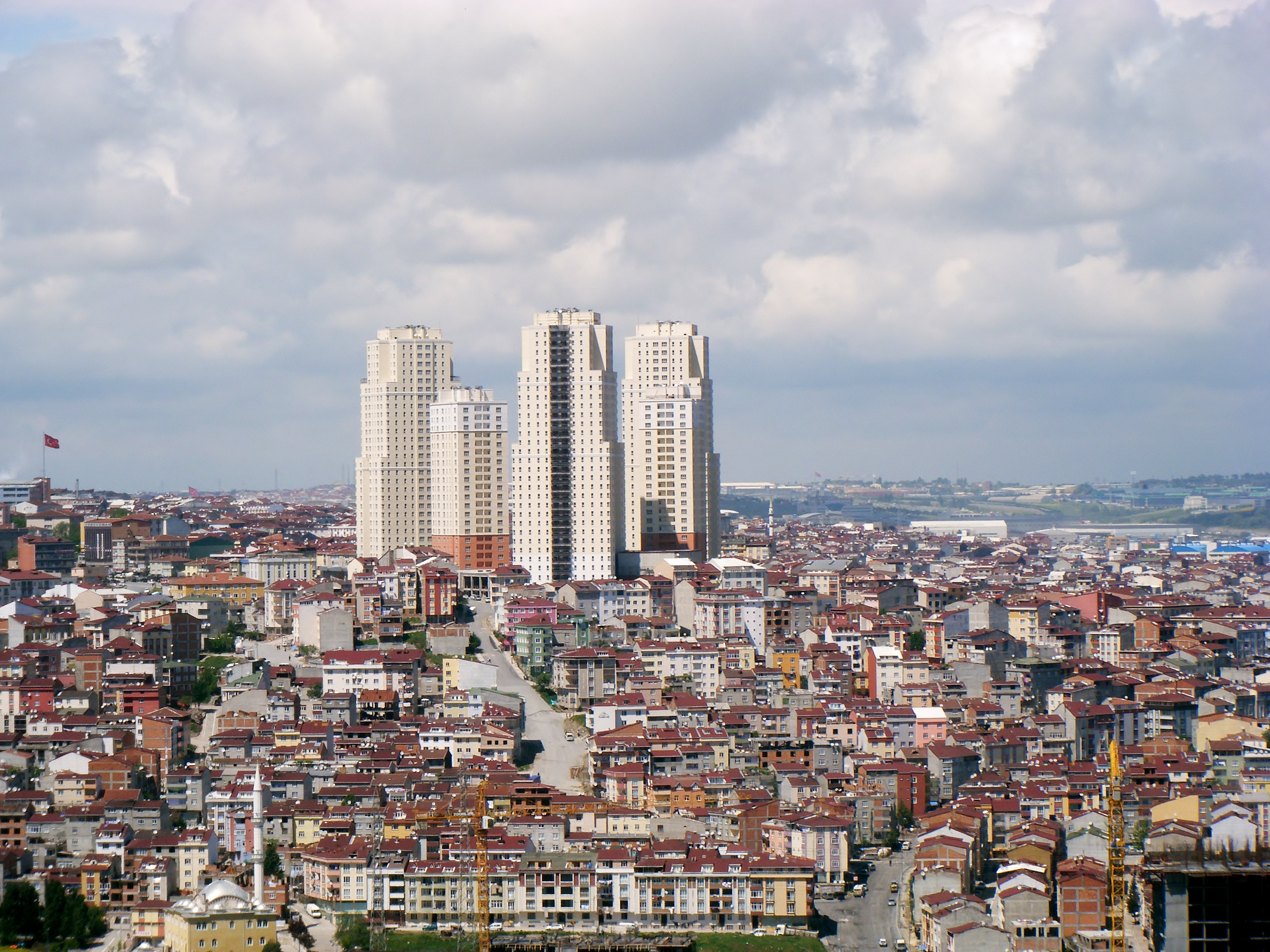
- Esenyurt Star Towers

- Logo

- Map showing Esenyurt District in Istanbul Province

- Location within Turkey Location within Istanbul
- Coordinates: 41°02′03″N 28°40′48″E
- Country: Turkey
- Province: Istanbul

Government
  - Mayor: Can Aksoy (State Appointment)
- Area: 43 km^{2} (17 sq mi)
- Population (2022): 983,571
  - Density: 23,000/km^{2} (59,000/sq mi)
- Time zone: UTC+3 (TRT)
- Postal code: 34510
- Area code: 0212
- Website: www.esenyurt.bel.tr

Esenyurt (Turkish: [eˈsɛnjuɾt]) is a municipality and district of Istanbul Province, Turkey. Its area is 43 km^{2}, and its population is 983,571 (2022). Located in the European side of Istanbul, Esenyurt borders with Avcılar and Lake Küçükçekmece on the east, Büyükçekmece on the west, Başakşehir, Arnavutköy and TEM road on the north and Beylikdüzü and E-5 motorway on the south.

With the construction boom of large residential complexes in the area in the past few years, Esenyurt benefited from a major development. It now has four cultural centres, which are Esenyurt Cultural Centre, Saadetdere Cultural Centre, Yenikent Cultural Centre and Yunus Balta Cultural Centre. Four parks built in Esenyurt (Recep Tayyip Erdoğan Park, Şehitler Park, Gaziler Park and Kadir Topbaş Park) are also situated among the complexes.

== History ==
The district is mainly built on the land owned by Ekrem Ömer Paşa in the 19th century. The name Esenyurt derives from one of the land owners Eşkinoz. Which in turn comes from the Greek Ksenos, (Greek: ξένος) meaning "foreigner".

The area received migration from Romania and Bulgaria between 1920 and 1938, and had more recent migration mainly from Ardahan and Kars, as well as Erzurum and Artvin. In 1990s, Kurds evicted from their villages during the armed conflict between Turkey and the Kurdistan Workers' Party (PKK) were settled in the district.

The municipality Esenyurt was established in 1989. In 2008 the district Esenyurt was created from part of the district Büyükçekmece.

In 2024, Ahmet Özer, the mayor of the district, was removed from office by the Turkish Interior Ministry, following his arrest.

== Esenyurt today ==
Esenyurt is a popular residential area due to the brand new properties and affordable property prices compared with Istanbul centre. Esenyurt is home to the Istanbul Esenyurt University, while being very close to Beykent University, Istanbul Arel University, Istanbul University and Istanbul Gelişim University. TUYAP Exhibition and Conference Centre is only 5km away from Esenyurt centre, while it is 26km away from the Istanbul Atatürk Airport. Shopping facilities are mainly gathered around shopping centres rather than individual shops along the streets. Esenyurt has three shopping centres, which are Eskule Shopping Centre, Torium Shopping Centre, City Center Shopping Centre and Akbatı AVM.

== Composition ==
There are 43 neighbourhoods in Esenyurt District:

- Akçaburgaz
- Akevler
- Akşemseddin
- Ardıçlı
- Aşık Veysel
- Atatürk
- Bağlarçeşme
- Balıkyolu
- Barbaros Hayrettin Paşa
- Battalgazi
- Çınar
- Cumhuriyet
- Esenkent
- Fatih
- Gökevler
- Güzelyurt
- Hürriyet
- İncirtepe
- İnönü
- İstiklal
- Koza
- Mehmet Akif Ersoy
- Mehterçeşme
- Mevlana
- Namık Kemal
- Necip Fazıl Kısakürek
- Orhan Gazi
- Örnek
- Osmangazi
- Pınar
- Piri Reis
- Saadetdere
- Şehitler
- Selahaddin Eyyubi
- Süleymaniye
- Sultaniye
- Talatpaşa
- Turgut Özal
- Üçevler
- Yenikent
- Yeşilkent
- Yunus Emre
- Zafer

== Transportation ==
=== Public buses to/from Esenyurt ===
- 142E Esenyurt Incirtepe - Aksaray
- 142K Esenyurt Kiptaş 4. Etap- 5. Etap- Avcılar
- 142T Esenyurt Public Hospital - TUYAP Exhibition and Conference Centre
- 429 Kıraç - Yenibosna Metro

=== Metrobus lines to/from Esenyurt ===
- 34B Beylikdüzü - Avcılar
- 34BZ Beylikdüzü - Zincirlikuyu (night service)
- 34C Beylikdüzü - Cevizlibağ
- 34G Beylikdüzü - Söğütlüçeşme (night service)

== Government ==
The mayor is Kemal Deniz Bozkurt of the center-left Republican People's Party (CHP).

== Education ==
- Beykent University Hadımköy Campus

== Sport ==
Süper Lig football club İstanbulspor plays their home matches at Esenyurt Necmi Kadıoğlu Stadium.

== Demographics ==
According to TURKSTAT, the population of Istanbul was 15 million 29 thousand 231 people in 2017, while the population increased by 38 thousand 493 in 2018 to 15 million 67 thousand 724 people. Istanbul's most populous districts are Esenyurt more than 891 thousand 120 people.

== Recreation ==
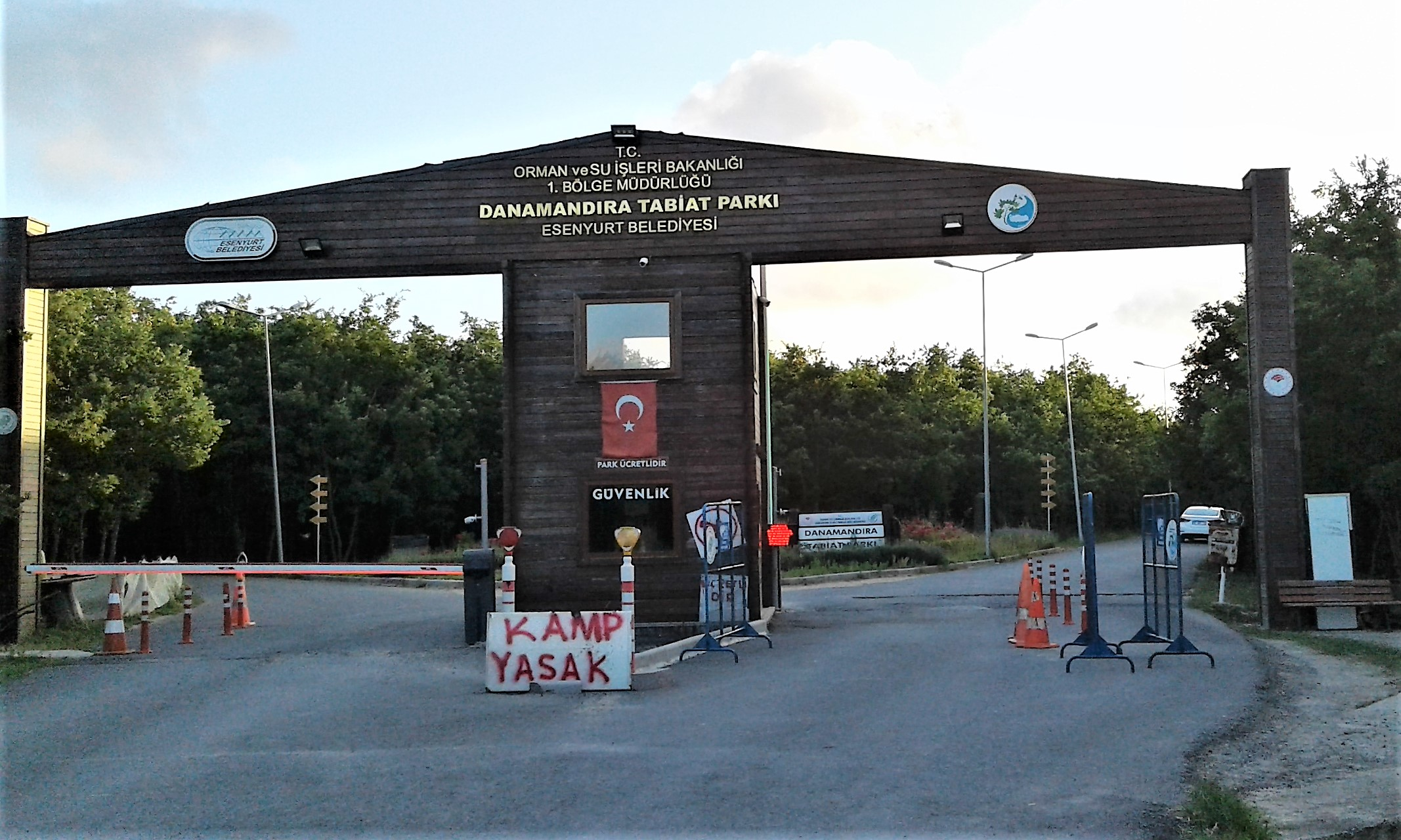
Entrance of the Danamandıra Nature Park in Silivri district.

In 2016, the municipality leased the Danamandıra Nature Park in Silivri district for 49 years in order to provide recreation area for the residents of the crowded district.

== Gallery ==
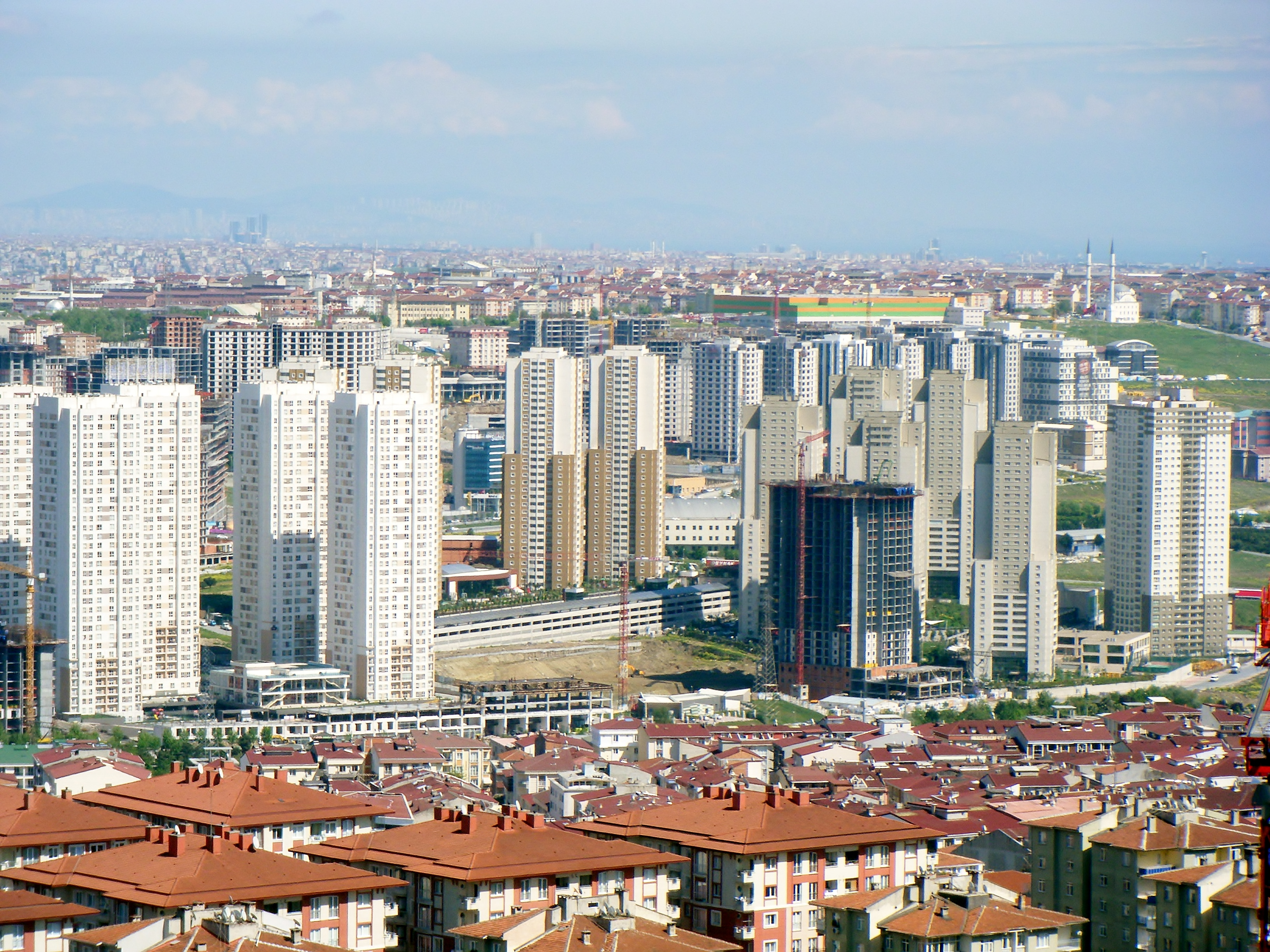
Haramidere Skyscrapers District
