= Jankat Yılmaz =

Turkish footballer (born 2004)

Personal information
- Date of birth: 16 August 2004 (age 22)
- Place of birth: Istanbul, Turkey
- Height: 1.88 m (6 ft 2 in)
- Position: Goalkeeper

Team information
- Current team: Galatasaray
- Number: 24

Youth career
- 2018–2023: Galatasaray

Senior career*
Years	Team	Apps	(Gls)
2022–	Galatasaray	1	(0)
2024–2025	→ Adanaspor (loan)	12	(0)
2025–2026	→ Eyüpspor (loan)	14	(0)
- * Club domestic league appearances and goals as of 30 August 2026 ‡ National team caps and goals as of 7 June 2023

Jankat Yılmaz (born 16 August 2004) is a Turkish professional footballer who plays as a goalkeeper for Süper Lig club Galatasaray.

== Youth career ==
On 22 September 2017 Jankat signed an amateur contract with Galatasaray. He transferred from his previous club, Akdeniz Kartalları Gençlik ve Spor. On 4 May 2019, Jankat played in the U16 finals against MKE Ankaragücü U16 in Antalya. They ended up losing the match 1–0.

Jankat started playing for the Galatasaray U19 in the 2021–22 season. He has played 36 matches for the team in the U19 league.

== Professional career ==
=== Galatasaray ===
Jankat signed a professional contract with Galatasaray on 1 July 2022. This contract was extended to the end of the 2024–25 season on 25 January 2023.

==== Adanaspor (loan) ====
On July 29, 2024, it was announced that he was loaned to Adanaspor until the end of the 2024–25 season.

==== Eyüpspor (loan) ====
On September 12, 2025, it was announced that he was loaned to Eyüpspor until the end of the 2025–26 season.

== Career statistics ==
As of match played 17 May 2026

Appearances and goals by club, season and competition
Club	Season	League			National cup		Europe		Other		Total	
Club	Season	Division	Apps	Goals	Apps	Goals	Apps	Goals	Apps	Goals	Apps	Goals
Galatasaray	2021–22	Süper Lig	0	0	0	0	0	0	—		0	0
Galatasaray	2022–23	Süper Lig	0	0	0	0	—		—		0	0
Galatasaray	2023–24	Süper Lig	0	0	0	0	0	0	—		0	0
Galatasaray	2024–25	Süper Lig	0	0	0	0	0	0	—		0	0
Galatasaray	Total		0	0	0	0	0	0	—		0	0
Yverdon-Sport (loan)	2024–25	TFF 1. Lig	12	0	0	0	—		—		12	0
Eyüpspor (loan)	2025–26	Süper Lig	14	0	3	0	—		—		17	0
Career total			26	0	3	0	0	0	0	0	29	0

== Honours ==
Galatasaray

- Süper Lig: 2022–23, 2023–24, 2024–25
- Turkish Super Cup: 2023
- Turkish Cup: 2024–25
