= 2023–24 Galatasaray S.K. season =

Galatasaray
2023–24 season
- President: Dursun Özbek
- Head coach: Okan Buruk
- Stadium: Rams Park
- Süper Lig: 1st
- Turkish Cup: Quarter-finals
- Turkish Super Cup: Winners
- UEFA Champions League: Group stage
- UEFA Europa League: Knockout round play-offs
- Top goalscorer: League: Mauro Icardi (25); All: Mauro Icardi (32)
- Highest home attendance: 53,755 vs Fenerbahçe, 19 May 2024, Süper Lig
- Lowest home attendance: 25,085 vs Ümraniyespor, 18 January 2024, Turkish Cup
- Average home league attendance: 43,251
- Biggest win: 6–1 vs Sivasspor (H), 5 May 2024, Süper Lig
- Biggest defeat: 1–4 vs Sparta Prague (A), 22 February 2024, UEFA Europa League
Home colours	Away colours	100th Anniversary colours

The 2023–24 season was the 119th season in the existence of Galatasaray S.K. and the club's 66th consecutive season in the top flight of Turkish football. In addition to the domestic league, Galatasaray participated in this season's edition of the Turkish Cup, Turkish Super Cup, UEFA Champions League and UEFA Europa League.

== Overview ==
=== July ===
On 18 July, Galatasaray were drawn against FK Žalgiris in the second qualifying roundof the UEFA Champions League.

On 18 July, the 2023–24 Süper Lig fixtures were announced.

On 20 July, a health sponsorship agreement was signed with Medicana Health Group.

On 21 July, Rams Global became the stadium title sponsor of Ali Sami Yen Sports Complex under the name Rams Park.

On 31 July, SOCAR became the energy and shirt sponsor in European competition matches for next three seasons. Galatasaray are set to receive €5,000,000 per year according to the sponsorship deal.

=== August ===
On 31 August, the group draw of the UEFA Champions League in the 2023–24 season was held in Monaco. Galatasaray were drawn into Group A with Bayern Munich, Manchester United and Copenhagen.

=== September ===
On 5 September, Galatasaray's team roster for the group stage of the UEFA Champions League was announced. Halil Dervişoğlu and Léo Dubois were left out of the squad.

On 23 September, Galatasaray Sports Club board member Levent Yaz announced that he was resigning from his position with immediate effect. Three days later, Mehmet İsmail Sarıkaya was appointed to the vacant board member position.

=== October ===
On 3 October, Galatasaray defeated Manchester United 3–2 at Old Trafford. It was the club's first ever win in England after 11 attempts.

On 10 October, Galatasaray Board Member Cemal Özgörkey announced that he resigned from his post with a post on social media.

On 18 October, Mehmet Saruhan Cibara was appointed as the Vice Chairman of the Board of Directors, which became vacant after Cemal Özgörkey resigned from his position.

=== May ===
On May 26, Galatasaray defeated Konyaspor 3-1 away. The team became the champion of the Süper Lig 2023–24 season with a record 102 points.

On May 26, Argentinian football player Mauro Icardi increased his number of goals in the league to 25 this season with the goals he scored against Konyaspor and finished the season as the top scorer.

On May 26, Dries Mertens finished the season as the assist king in Süper Lig. Mertens recorded 9 goals and 18 assists in 35 matches this season.

== Club ==
=== Board of directors ===
Position	Staff
President	(Turkey) Dursun Özbek
Second President	(Turkey) Metin Öztürk
Vice President	(Turkey) Niyazi Yelkencioğlu
Vice President	(Turkey) Mehmet Saruhan Cibara
General Secretary	(Turkey) Eray Yazgan
Accounting Member	(Turkey) Mehmet İsmail Sarıkaya
Board Spokesperson	(Turkey) Rıza Tevfik Morova
Board Member	(Turkey) Bora İsmail Bahçetepe
Board Member	(Turkey) Dikran Gülmezgil
Board Member	(Turkey) Can Natan
Board Member	(Turkey) Emir Aral
Board Member	(Turkey) Cansu Ak Yılmaz
Board Member	(Turkey) Tanur Lara Yılmaz
Board Member	(Turkey) Cem Soylu
Galatasaray HS Principal	(Turkey) Prof. Dr. Mustafa Reşat Dabak

Last updated: 6 February 2024
Source: Galatasaray.org, Galatasaray.org

=== Sportif AŞ Board of directors ===
Position	Staff
Chairman of the Board	(Turkey) Dursun Özbek
Vice President	(Turkey) Erden Timur
Board Member	(Turkey) Metin Öztürk
Board Member	(Turkey) Niyazi Yelkencioğlu
Board Member	(Turkey) Eray Yazgan
Board Member	(Turkey) Can Natan
Board Member	(Turkey) İbrahim Hatipoğlu
Board Member	(Turkey) Mustafa Aktaş
Independent Board Member	(Turkey) Maruf Güneş
Independent Board Member	(Turkey) Nihat Kırmızı
Independent Board Member	(Turkey) Fatih Süleyman Demircan
Independent Board Member	(Azerbaijan) (Turkey) Emin İmanov

Last updated: 8 June 2023
Source: Galatasaray.org

=== Facilities ===
Position	Staff
Stadium	(Turkey) Rams Park
Sports Complex	(Turkey) Ali Sami Yen Sports Complex
Training facility	(Turkey) Florya Metin Oktay Facilities

Last updated: 8 June 2023
Source: Galatasaray.org

== First team ==
=== First-team coaching staff ===
Position	Staff
Football Director	(Turkey) Cenk Ergün
Head Coach	(Turkey) Okan Buruk
Assistant Coach	(Turkey) İrfan Saraloğlu
Assistant Coach	(Spain) Ismael García Gómez
Goalkeeping Coach	(Turkey) Fadıl Koşutan
Goalkeeping Coach	(Turkey) Can Okuyucu
Athletic Performance Coach	(Turkey) Dursun Genç
Athletic Performance Coach	(Turkey) Kaan Arısoy
Athletic Performance Coach	(Turkey) Yusuf Köklü
Athletic Performance Coach	(Turkey) Gürkan Fuat Demir
Match and Performance Analyst	(Turkey) Yılmaz Yüksel
Match and Performance Analyst	(Turkey) Serhat Doğan
Match and Performance Analyst	(Turkey) M. Can Mutlu
Administrative Manager	(Turkey) Uğur Yıldız
Scouting and Performance Analysis Manager	(Turkey) Emre Utkucan
Research and Development Director	(Germany) (Turkey) Fatih Demireli
Doctor	(Turkey) Yener İnce
Doctor	(Turkey) Hakan Çelebi
Media and Communications Manager	(Turkey) Coşkun Gülbahar
Media Officer	(Turkey) Egehan Şengül
Interpreter	(Turkey) Ersan Zeren
Interpreter	(Turkey) Utku Yurtbil
Nutritionist	(Turkey) Mestan Hüseyin Çilekçi
Physiotherapist	(Turkey) Mustafa Korkmaz
Physiotherapist	(Turkey) Burak Koca
Physiotherapist	(Turkey) Samet Polat
Physiotherapist	(Turkey) Erkan Özyılmaz
Masseur	(Turkey) Sedat Peker
Masseur	(Turkey) Batuhan Erkan
Masseur	(Turkey) Ozan Abaylı
Masseur	(Turkey) Serdal Yılmaz
Material Manager	(Turkey) Hasan Çelik
Material Manager	(Turkey) Veli Muğlı
Material Manager	(Turkey) İlyas Gökçe

Last updated: 7 June 2023.
Source: Futbol A Takım İdari ve Teknik Kadro – GALATASARAY.ORG

=== First-team squad ===
Notes:

- Players and squad numbers last updated on 15 February 2024. Age as of 30 June 2024.
- Flags indicate national team as defined under FIFA eligibility rules. Players may hold more than one non-FIFA nationality.

No.	Player	Nat.	Position(s)	Date of birth (Age)	Signed in	Contract ends	Signed from	Transfer fee	Ref.
Goalkeepers
1	Fernando Muslera (captain)	(Uruguay) (Italy)	GK	16 June 1986 (aged 38)	2011	2025	(Italy) Lazio	€6,750,000 + Cana	
12	Atakan Nuri Ordu	(Turkey)	GK	29 March 2005 (aged 19)	2023	2025	Academy	N/A	
19	Günay Güvenç	(Turkey) (Germany)	GK	25 June 1991 (aged 33)	2023	2026	(Turkey) Gaziantep	€250,000	
50	Jankat Yılmaz	(Turkey)	GK	16 August 2004 (aged 19)	2022	2025	Academy	N/A	
Defenders
6	Davinson Sánchez	(Colombia)	CB	12 June 1996 (aged 28)	2023	2027	(England) Tottenham Hotspur	€9,500,000	
17	Derrick Köhn	(Germany)	LB	4 February 1999 (aged 25)	2024	2026	(Germany) Hannover 96	€3,350,000	
23	Kaan Ayhan	(Turkey) (Germany)	CB	10 November 1994 (age 32)	2023	2026	(Italy) Sassuolo	€2,800,000	
25	Victor Nelsson	(Denmark)	CB	14 October 1998 (aged 25)	2021	2026	(Denmark) Copenhagen	€7,000,000	
42	Abdülkerim Bardakcı	(Turkey)	CB	7 September 1994 (aged 29)	2022	2025	(Turkey) Konyaspor	€2,800,000	
58	Ali Yeşilyurt	(Turkey)	CB	30 July 2005 (aged 18)	2023	2025	Academy	N/A	
72	Ali Turap Bülbül	(Turkey)	RB	25 January 2005 (aged 19)	2023	2027	Academy	N/A	
92	Serge Aurier	(Ivory Coast)	RB	24 December 1992 (aged 31)	2024	2024	(England) Nottingham Forest	€100,000	
Midfielders
5	Eyüp Aydın	(Germany) (Turkey)	DM	2 August 2004 (aged 19)	2023	2026	(Germany) Bayern Munich II	€250,000	
7	Kerem Aktürkoğlu (vice-captain)	(Turkey)	LW	21 October 1998 (aged 25)	2020	2026	(Turkey) 24 Erzincanspor	Free	
8	Kerem Demirbay	(Germany) (Turkey)	CM	3 July 1993 (aged 30)	2023	2026	(Germany) Bayer Leverkusen	€3,700,000	
14	Wilfried Zaha	(Ivory Coast) (England)	RW	10 November 1992 (aged 31)	2023	2026	(England) Crystal Palace	Free	
18	Berkan Kutlu	(Turkey) (Switzerland)	CM	25 January 1998 (aged 26)	2021	2026	(Turkey) Alanyaspor	Undisclosed	
20	Tetê	(Brazil)	RW	15 February 2000 (aged 24)	2023	2027	(Ukraine) Shakhtar Donetsk	Free	
22	Hakim Ziyech	(Morocco) (Netherlands)	AM	19 March 1993 (aged 31)	2023	2024	(England) Chelsea	Loan	
27	Sérgio Oliveira	(Portugal)	CM	2 June 1992 (aged 32)	2022	2026	(Portugal) Porto	€3,000,000	
33	Gökdeniz Gürpüz	(Germany) (Turkey)	CM	1 March 2006 (aged 18)	2023	2026	(Germany) Borussia Dortmund	€220,000	
34	Lucas Torreira	(Uruguay) (Spain)	DM	11 February 1996 (aged 28)	2022	2026	(England) Arsenal	€6,000,000	
53	Barış Alper Yılmaz	(Turkey)	LW	23 May 2000 (aged 24)	2021	2027	(Turkey) Ankara Keçiörengücü	Undisclosed	
81	Hamza Akman	(Turkey)	CM	27 September 2004 (aged 19)	2022	2024	Academy	N/A	
83	Efe Akman	(Turkey)	DM	20 March 2006 (aged 18)	2023	2024	Academy	N/A	
91	Tanguy Ndombele	(France) (Democratic Republic of the Congo)	CM	28 December 1996 (aged 27)	2023	2024	(England) Tottenham Hotspur	Loan	
Forwards
9	Mauro Icardi	(Argentina) (Italy)	CF	19 February 1993 (aged 31)	2022	2026	(France) Paris Saint-Germain	€10,000,000	
10	Dries Mertens	(Belgium)	CF	6 May 1987 (aged 37)	2022	2024	(Italy) Napoli	Free	
56	Baran Demiroğlu	(Turkey)	CF	2 May 2005 (aged 19)	2023	2025	Academy	N/A	
95	Carlos Vinícius	(Brazil)	CF	25 March 1995 (aged 29)	2024	2024	(England) Fulham	Loan	
Player(s) on loan during the season
2	Léo Dubois	(France)	RB	14 September 1994 (aged 29)	2022	2025	(France) Lyon	€2,500,000	
4	Mathias Ross	(Denmark)	CB	15 January 2001 (aged 23)	2022	2026	(Denmark) AaB	€1,750,000	
8	Taylan Antalyalı	(Turkey)	DM	8 January 1995 (aged 29)	2019	2026	(Turkey) BB Erzurumspor	Free	
11	Yunus Akgün	(Turkey)	RW	7 July 2000 (aged 23)	2018	2026	Academy	N/A	
17	Nicolò Zaniolo	(Italy)	AM	2 July 1999 (aged 24)	2023	2027	(Italy) Roma	€15,000,000	
21	Halil Dervişoğlu	(Turkey) (Netherlands)	CF	8 December 1999 (aged 24)	2023	2027	(England) Brentford	€500,000	
24	Işık Kaan Arslan	(Turkey)	CB	28 January 2001 (aged 23)	2017	2025	Academy	N/A	
29	Eren Aydın	(Turkey)	CF	12 February 2003 (aged 21)	2022	2026	Academy	N/A	
30	Yusuf Demir	(Austria)	RW	2 June 2003 (aged 21)	2022	2026	(Austria) Rapid Wien	€6,000,000	
33	Alexandru Cicâldău	(Romania)	AM	8 July 1997 (aged 26)	2021	2026	(Romania) Universitatea Craiova	€6,500,000	
35	Batuhan Şen	(Turkey)	GK	3 February 1999 (aged 25)	2019	2026	Academy	N/A	
40	Emin Bayram	(Turkey)	CB	2 April 2003 (aged 21)	2019	2026	Academy	N/A	
59	Caner Doğan	(Turkey)	RW	23 February 2004 (aged 20)	2023	2025	Academy	N/A	
63	Baran Aksaka	(Turkey)	AM	29 January 2003 (aged 21)	2022	2026	Academy	N/A	
88	Kazımcan Karataş	(Turkey)	LB	16 January 2003 (aged 21)	2022	2027	(Turkey) Altay	€1,150,000	
90	Metehan Baltacı	(Turkey)	CB	3 November 2002 (aged 21)	2021	2026	Academy	N/A	
98	Berk Balaban	(Turkey)	GK	1 January 2000 (aged 24)	2020	2025	Academy	N/A	
–	İlhami Siraçhan Nas	(Turkey)	AM	20 June 2002 (aged 22)	2023	2028	(Turkey) Ankaraspor	€337,000	
Player(s) transferred out during the season
3	Angeliño	(Spain)	LB	4 January 1997 (aged 27)	2023	2024	(Germany) RB Leipzig	Loan	
6	Fredrik Midtsjø	(Norway)	CM	11 August 1993 (aged 30)	2022	2025	(Netherlands) AZ	€3,500,000	
80	Olimpiu Moruțan	(Romania)	AM	25 April 1999 (aged 25)	2021	2026	(Romania) FCSB	€3,500,000	
93	Sacha Boey	(France)	RB	13 September 2000 (aged 23)	2021	2025	(France) Rennes	Undisclosed	
94	Cédric Bakambu	(Democratic Republic of the Congo) (France)	CF	11 April 1991 (aged 33)	2023	2025	(United Arab Emirates) Al Nasr SC	€700,000	
–	Alpaslan Öztürk	(Turkey) (Belgium)	CB	16 July 1993 (aged 30)	2021	2024	(Turkey) Göztepe	Free	
–	Oğulcan Çağlayan	(Turkey)	RW	22 March 1996 (aged 28)	2020	2024	(Turkey) Çaykur Rizespor	Free	

== New contracts and transfers ==
=== New contracts ===
Date	No.	Pos.	Player	Transferred from	Fee	Team	Source
1 July 2023	23	DF	(Turkey) Kaan Ayhan	(Italy) Sassuolo	€2,800,000	First team	

=== Contract extensions ===
Date	No.	Pos.	Player	Status	Contract length	Contract ends	Team	Source
1 August 2023	29	FW	(Turkey) Eren Aydın	Extended	Three-year	30 June 2026	First team	
2 August 2023	59	MF	(Turkey) Caner Doğan	Extended	Two-year	30 June 2025	Academy	
18 September 2023	–	FW	(Kyrgyzstan) (Turkey) Beknaz Almazbekov	Extended	Three-year	30 June 2026	Academy	
2 February 2024	72	DF	(Turkey) Ali Turap Bülbül	Extended	Three-year	30 June 2027	Academy	
19 April 2024	1	GK	(Uruguay) Fernando Muslera	Extended	One-year	30 June 2025	First team	
19 April 2024	23	DF	(Turkey) Kaan Ayhan	Extended	n/a	n/a	First team	
19 April 2024	34	MF	(Uruguay) Lucas Torreira	Extended	n/a	n/a	First team	
19 April 2024	42	DF	(Turkey) Abdülkerim Bardakcı	Extended	n/a	n/a	First team	
19 April 2024	53	MF	(Turkey) Barış Alper Yılmaz	Extended	n/a	n/a	First team	

=== Transfers in ===
Date	No.	Pos.	Player	Transferred from	Fee	Team	Source
30 June 2023	5	DF	(Turkey) Alpaslan Öztürk	(Turkey) Eyüpspor	Loan return	First team	
30 June 2023	8	MF	(Turkey) Taylan Antalyalı	(Turkey) Ankaragücü	Loan return	First team	
30 June 2023	11	FW	(Egypt) Mostafa Mohamed	(France) Nantes	Loan return	First team	
30 June 2023	12	GK	(Turkey) Batuhan Şen	(Turkey) Fatih Karagümrük	Loan return	First team	
30 June 2023	17	MF	(Turkey) Oğulcan Çağlayan	(Turkey) Pendikspor	Loan return	First team	
30 June 2023	21	MF	(Romania) Olimpiu Moruțan	(Italy) Pisa	Loan return	First team	
30 June 2023	24	DF	(Turkey) Işık Kaan Arslan	(Turkey) Sarıyer	Loan return	First team	
30 June 2023	28	DF	(Democratic Republic of the Congo) Christian Luyindama	(Turkey) Antalyaspor	Loan return	First team	
30 June 2023	30	MF	(Turkey) Atalay Babacan	(Turkey) Sarıyer	Loan return	First team	
30 June 2023	33	MF	(Romania) Alexandru Cicâldău	(United Arab Emirates) Al-Ittihad Kalba SC	Loan return	First team	
30 June 2023	47	MF	(Turkey) Abdussamed Karnuçu	(Turkey) Amedspor	Loan return	First team	
30 June 2023	50	DF	(Turkey) Süleyman Luş	(Turkey) Tuzlaspor	Loan return	First team	
30 June 2023	54	MF	(Turkey) Emre Kılınç	(Turkey) Ankaragücü	Loan return	First team	
30 June 2023	90	DF	(Turkey) Metehan Baltacı	(Turkey) Manisa	Loan return	First team	
30 June 2023	98	GK	(Turkey) Berk Balaban	(Turkey) İskenderun	Loan return	First team	
15 July 2023	21	FW	(Turkey) Halil Dervişoğlu	(England) Brentford	€500,000	First team	
22 July 2023	94	FW	(Democratic Republic of the Congo) Cédric Bakambu	(United Arab Emirates) Al Nasr SC	€700,000	First team	
23 July 2023	14	MF	(Ivory Coast) Wilfried Zaha	(England) Crystal Palace	Free	First team	
28 July 2023	9	FW	(Argentina) Mauro Icardi	(France) Paris Saint-Germain	€10,000,000	First team	
1 August 2023	19	GK	(Turkey) Günay Güvenç	(Turkey) Gaziantep	€250,000	First team	
1 August 2023	8	MF	(Germany) Kerem Demirbay	(Germany) Bayer Leverkusen	€3,700,000	First team	
10 August 2023	20	MF	(Brazil) Tetê	(Ukraine) Shakhtar Donetsk	Free	First team	
12 August 2023	–	MF	(Turkey) İlhami Siraçhan Nas	(Turkey) Ankaraspor	€337,000	First team	
4 September 2023	6	DF	(Colombia) Davinson Sánchez	(England) Tottenham Hotspur	€9,500,000	First team	
14 September 2023	5	MF	(Germany) Eyüp Aydın	(Germany) Bayern Munich II	€250,000	First team	
21 September 2023	33	MF	(Turkey) Gökdeniz Gürpüz	(Germany) Borussia Dortmund	€220,000	First team	
12 January 2024	18	MF	(Turkey) Berkan Kutlu	(Italy) Genoa	Loan return	First team	
2 February 2024	92	DF	(Ivory Coast) Serge Aurier	(England) Nottingham Forest	€100,000	First team	
8 February 2024	17	DF	(Germany) Derrick Köhn	(Germany) Hannover 96	€3,350,000	First team	

=== Transfers out ===
Date	No.	Pos.	Player	Transferred to	Fee	Team	Source
14 June 2023	31	FW	(Egypt) Mostafa Mohamed	(France) Nantes	€5,750,000	First team	
30 June 2023	13	DF	(Turkey) Emre Taşdemir	(Turkey) Pendikspor	End of contract	First team	
30 June 2023	18	FW	(France) Bafétimbi Gomis	(Japan) Kawasaki Frontale	End of contract	First team	
30 June 2023	34	GK	(Turkey) Okan Kocuk	(Turkey) Samsunspor	End of contract	First team	
30 June 2023	64	MF	(Spain) Juan Mata	(Japan) Vissel Kobe	End of contract	First team	
30 June 2023	23	DF	(Turkey) Kaan Ayhan	(Italy) Sassuolo	Loan return	First team	
30 June 2023	26	MF	(Kosovo) Milot Rashica	(England) Norwich City	Loan return	First team	
30 June 2023	32	DF	(Canada) Sam Adekugbe	(Turkey) Hatayspor	Loan return	First team	
30 June 2023	99	FW	(Argentina) Mauro Icardi	(France) Paris Saint-Germain	Loan return	First team	
25 July 2023	–	DF	(Turkey) Gökay Güney	(Turkey) Kırşehir FK	Mutual agreement	First team	
28 July 2023	–	MF	(Turkey) Abdussamed Karnuçu	(Turkey) 68 Aksaray Belediye Spor	Undisclosed	First team	
31 July 2023	–	MF	(Turkey) Atalay Babacan	(Turkey) Boluspor	Undisclosed	First team	
4 August 2023	54	MF	(Turkey) Emre Kılınç	(Turkey) Samsunspor	Undisclosed	First team	
6 August 2023	73	DF	(Turkey) Süleyman Luş	(Turkey) Çorum FK	Undisclosed	First team	
20 August 2023	80	MF	(Romania) Olimpiu Moruțan	(Turkey) Ankaragücü	€3,000,000	First team	
25 August 2023	–	DF	(Turkey) Alpaslan Öztürk	(Turkey) Pendikspor	Undisclosed	First team	
7 September 2023	6	MF	(Norway) Fredrik Midtsjø	(Turkey) Pendikspor	€3,000,000	First team	
12 September 2023	–	MF	(Turkey) Oğulcan Çağlayan	(Turkey) Gaziantep	Mutual agreement	First team	
18 December 2023	–	DF	(Democratic Republic of the Congo) Christian Luyindama		Mutual agreement	First team	
28 January 2024	93	DF	(France) Sacha Boey	(Germany) Bayern Munich	€30,000,000 + Add-ons	First team	
30 January 2024	3	DF	(Spain) Angeliño	(Italy) Roma	Mutual agreement	First team	
2 February 2024	94	FW	(Democratic Republic of the Congo) Cédric Bakambu	(Spain) Real Betis	€5,000,000	First team	

=== Loans in ===
Date	No.	Pos.	Player	From	Fee	Option to buy	Team	Source
12 July 2023	3	DF	(Spain) Angeliño	(Germany) RB Leipzig	€1,500,000	Yes	First team	
19 August 2023	22	MF	(Morocco) Hakim Ziyech	(England) Chelsea	Free	Yes	First team	
4 September 2023	91	MF	(France) Tanguy Ndombele	(England) Tottenham Hotspur	Free	Yes	First team	
2 February 2024	95	FW	(Brazil) Carlos Vinícius	(England) Fulham	€600,000	No	First team	

=== Loans out ===
Date	No.	Pos.	Player	Transferred to	Fee	Until	Team	Source
8 March 2023	3	DF	(Netherlands) Patrick van Aanholt	(Netherlands) PSV	Undisclosed	End of season	First team	
21 July 2023	4	DF	(Denmark) Mathias Ross	(Netherlands) NEC	€250,000	End of season	First team	
20 July 2023	24	DF	(Turkey) Işık Kaan Arslan	(Turkey) Fethiyespor	Undisclosed	End of season	First team	
25 July 2023	8	MF	(Turkey) Taylan Antalyalı	(Turkey) Samsunspor	Undisclosed	End of season	First team	
1 August 2023	35	GK	(Turkey) Batuhan Şen	(Turkey) Gaziantep	Undisclosed	End of season	First team	
1 August 2023	33	MF	(Romania) Alexandru Cicâldău	(Turkey) Konyaspor	Undisclosed	End of season	First team	
6 August 2023	90	DF	(Turkey) Metehan Baltacı	(Turkey) Eyüpspor	Undisclosed	End of season	First team	
7 August 2023	29	FW	(Turkey) Eren Aydın	(Turkey) Ahlatcı Çorum FK	Undisclosed	End of season	First team	
16 August 2023	30	MF	(Austria) Yusuf Demir	(Switzerland) Basel	Undisclosed	End of season	First team	
18 August 2023	17	MF	(Italy) Nicolò Zaniolo	(England) Aston Villa	€5,000,000	End of season	First team	
23 August 2023	98	GK	(Turkey) Berk Balaban	(Turkey) Isparta 32 Spor	Undisclosed	End of season	First team	
23 August 2023	59	MF	(Turkey) Caner Doğan	(Turkey) Sarıyer	Undisclosed	End of season	First team	
26 August 2023	11	MF	(Turkey) Yunus Akgün	(England) Leicester City	€500,000	End of season	First team	
30 August 2023	–	MF	(Turkey) İlhami Siraçhan Nas	(Turkey) Ümraniyespor	Undisclosed	End of season	First team	
31 August 2023	22	MF	(Turkey) Berkan Kutlu	(Italy) Genoa	€250,000	End of season	First team	
6 September 2023	40	DF	(Turkey) Emin Bayram	(Belgium) Westerlo	Undisclosed	End of season	First team	
15 September 2023	63	MF	(Turkey) Baran Aksaka	(Turkey) Şanlıurfaspor	Undisclosed	End of season	First team	
15 September 2023	2	DF	(France) Léo Dubois	(Turkey) İstanbul Başakşehir	Undisclosed	End of season	First team	
8 February 2024	88	DF	(Turkey) Kazımcan Karataş	(Turkey) Ankaragücü	Undisclosed	End of season	First team	
9 February 2024	21	FW	(Turkey) Halil Dervişoğlu	(Turkey) Hatayspor	Undisclosed	End of season	First team	

=== Transfer summary ===
"Undisclosed fees as well as additional bonuses which may be applicable and might affect the transfer income are not included in transfer amounts"

Expenditure

Summer: ▼€29,540,000

Winter: ▼€4,050,000

Total: ▼€33,590,000

Income

Summer: ▲€17,750,000

Winter: ▲€35,000,000

Total: ▲€52,750,000

Net totals

Summer: ▼€11,790,000

Winter: ▲€30,950,000

Total: ▲€19,160,000

== Kits ==
Galatasaray and Nike unveiled the home kits for the 2023–24 season on 4 June 2023.

On 12 June 2023, Galatasaray introduced the new away kit.

On 13 October 2023, Galatasaray unveiled the new season's third kit.

=== Sponsor ===
- Supplier: Nike
- Main sponsor: Sixt
- Main sponsor (Europe): SOCAR
- Back sponsor: Tatilsepeti
- Sleeve sponsor: GKN Kargo, Yünsa, Bilyoner
- Sleeve sponsor (Europe): Turkish Airlines
- Kısa sponsor: Başkent İnşaat
- Sock sponsor: —

=== Match ===
Home
Home alt.
Home alt.2
Home alt.3
Away
Away alt.
100th Anniversary
Goalkeeper 1
Goalkeeper 2
Goalkeeper 3

== Friendlies ==
Win Draw Loss Fixtures

=== Pre-season ===
5 July 2023 Corendon Summer Tour 2023	Galatasaray (Turkey)	3–4	(England) Hull City	İzmit, Turkey
20:30 TRT	Bayram 28'; Kutlu 30'; Ayhan 35'	Report 1 Report 2	Tetteh 45'; Slater (yellow card) 71' (goal) 84'; Christie 83'; Estupiñán 86'	Stadium: Kocaeli Stadium; Attendance: 35,000; Referee: Volkan Bayarslan

10 July 2023 Friendly	Galatasaray (Turkey)	2–0	(Hungary) Kisvárda	Graz, Styria, Austria
19:30 CEST; 20:30 TRT	Yılmaz 7'; Boey 68'	Report 1 Report 2		Stadium: Liebenauer Stadium; Referee: Jakob Semler

14 July 2023 Friendly	Austria Wien	1–1	(Turkey) Galatasaray	Vienna, Austria
19:30 CEST; 20:30 TRT	Ranftl (yellow card) 40'; Holland 49'; Martins (yellow card) 61'; Meisl (red card) 75'	Report 1 Report 2	Yılmaz 83'	Stadium: Franz Horr Stadium

15 July 2023 Friendly	Galatasaray (Turkey)	4–2	(Hungary) Csákvár	Bad Waltersdorf, Austria
18:30 CEST; 19:30 TRT	Moruțan 3'; Ayhan 54'; Zaniolo 56', 59'	Report 1 Report 2	Tamás 51'; Simon 78'	Stadium: Thermenstadion

18 July 2023 Friendly	Sturm Graz (Austria)	2–0	(Turkey) Galatasaray	Graz, Styria, Austria
19:00 CEST; 20:00 TRT	Affengruber (yellow card) 29'; Dante (yellow card) 55'; Grgic 71', 82'	Report 1 Report 2	Zaniolo (yellow card) 44'	Stadium: Liebenauer Stadium; Attendance: 4,000; Referee: Christian-Petru Ciochirca (Austria)

== Competitions ==
=== Overall record ===
Competition	First match	Last match	Starting round	Final position	Record							
Competition	First match	Last match	Starting round	Final position	Pld	W	D	L	GF	GA	GD	Win %
Süper Lig	12 August 2023	26 May 2024	Matchday 1	Winners	38	33	3	2	92	26	+66	86.84
Turkish Cup	18 January 2024	29 February 2024	Fifth round	Quarter-finals	3	2	0	1	8	5	+3	66.67
Turkish Super Cup	7 April 2024		Final	Winners	1	1	0	0	3	0	+3	100.00
UEFA Champions League	25 July 2023	12 December 2023	Second qualifying round	Group stage	12	6	3	3	22	18	+4	50.00
UEFA Europa League	15 February 2024	22 February 2024	Knockout round play-offs	Knockout round play-offs	2	1	0	1	4	6	−2	50.00
Total					56	43	6	7	129	55	+74	76.79

Source: Soccerway

=== Süper Lig ===
==== League table ====
Pos	Team	Pld	W	D	L	GF	GA	GD	Pts	Qualification or relegation
1	Galatasaray (C)	38	33	3	2	92	26	+66	102	Qualification for the Champions League play-off round
2	Fenerbahçe	38	31	6	1	99	31	+68	99	Qualification for the Champions League second qualifying round
3	Trabzonspor	38	21	4	13	69	50	+19	67	Qualification for the Europa League second qualifying round
4	Başakşehir	38	18	7	13	57	43	+14	61	Qualification for the Conference League second qualifying round
5	Kasımpaşa	38	16	8	14	62	65	−3	56 (Note: Kasımpaşa are ahead of Beşiktaş on head-to-head points: Kasımpaşa 2–1 Beşiktaş, Beşiktaş 1–3 Kasımpaşa.)	

Source: Süper Lig
Rules for classification: 1) Points; 2) Head-to-head points; 3) Head-to-head goal difference; 4) Head-to-head goals scored; 5) Goal difference; 6) Goals scored; 7) Play-off.
(C) Champions

==== Results summary ====
Overall								Home						Away					
Pld	W	D	L	GF	GA	GD	Pts	W	D	L	GF	GA	GD	W	D	L	GF	GA	GD
38	33	3	2	92	26	+66	102	18	0	1	51	15	+36	15	3	1	41	11	+30

Source: TFF.org

Pld = Matches played; W = Matches won; D = Matches drawn; L = Matches lost; GF = Goals for; GA = Goals against; GD = Goal difference; Pts = Points

==== Results by round ====
Round	1	2	3	4	5	6	7	8	9	10	11	12	13	14	15	16	17	18	19	20	21	22	23	24	25	26	27	28	29	30	31	32	33	34	35	36	37	38
Ground	A	H	A	A	H	A	H	A	H	A	H	A	H	A	H	A	H	A	H	H	A	H	H	A	H	A	H	A	H	A	H	A	H	A	H	A	H	A
Result	D	W	W	W	W	W	W	W	W	W	W	L	W	W	W	D	W	D	W	W	W	W	W	W	W	W	W	W	W	W	W	W	W	W	W	W	L	W
Position	12	5	3	2	2	2	2	2	2	2	1	2	2	2	2	2	2	2	2	2	2	2	2	2	1	1	1	1	1	1	1	1	1	1	1	1	1	1
Points	1	4	7	10	13	16	19	22	25	28	31	31	34	37	40	41	44	45	48	51	54	57	60	63	66	69	72	75	78	81	84	87	90	93	96	99	99	102

Source: TFF.org
A = Away; H = Home; W = Win; D = Draw; L = Loss

==== Score overview ====
Win Draw Loss

Opposition	Home score	Away score	Aggregate score	Double
Adana Demirspor	3–1	3–0	6–1	Yes
Alanyaspor	4–0	4–0	8–0	Yes
Ankaragücü	2–1	3–0	5–1	Yes
Antalyaspor	2–1	2–0	4–1	Yes
Beşiktaş	2–1	1–0	3–1	Yes
Çaykur Rizespor	6–2	1–0	7–2	Yes
Fatih Karagümrük	1–0	3–2	4–3	Yes
Fenerbahçe	0–1	0–0	0–1	No
Gaziantep	2–1	3–0	5–1	Yes
Hatayspor	1–0	1–2	2–2	No
İstanbul Başakşehir	2–0	2–1	4–1	Yes
İstanbulspor	3–1	1–0	4–1	Yes
Kasımpaşa	2–1	4–3	6–4	Yes
Kayserispor	2–1	0–0	2–1	No
Konyaspor	3–0	3–1	6–1	Yes
Pendikspor	4–1	2–0	6–1	Yes
Samsunspor	4–2	2–0	6–2	Yes
Sivasspor	6–1	1–1	7–2	No
Trabzonspor	2–0	5–1	7–1	Yes

==== Matches ====
The league fixtures were announced on 18 July 2023.

Win Draw Loss Postponed

12 August 2023 1	Kayserispor	0–0	Galatasaray	Melikgazi, Kayseri
21:45 TRT (UTC+3)	Gezek (yellow card) 10'; Uzodimma (yellow card) 42'	Report 1 Report 2 Report 3	Yılmaz (yellow card) 13'; Boey (yellow card) 30'	Stadium: Kadir Has Stadium; Attendance: 15,993; Referee: Halil Umut Meler; Assistant referees: Mustafa Emre Eyisoy, Kerem Ersoy; Fourth official: Burak Şeker

19 August 2023 2	Galatasaray	2–0	Trabzonspor	Sarıyer, Istanbul
21:45 TRT (UTC+3)	Icardi 23', 90' (yellow card) 62'; Oliveira (yellow card) 76'; Muslera (yellow card) 86'; Angeliño (yellow card) 86'	Report 1 Report 2 Report 3	Kourbelis (yellow card) 65'; Bardhi (yellow card) 68'; Elmalı (yellow card) 90'	Stadium: Rams Park; Attendance: 46,295; Referee: Atilla Karaoğlan; Assistant referees: Ceyhun Sesigüzel, Mehmet Emin Tuğral; Fourth official: Çağdaş Altay

26 September 2023 3	İstanbulspor	0–1	Galatasaray	Başakşehir, Istanbul
20:00 TRT (UTC+3)	Rroca (yellow card) 90+3'	Report 1 Report 2 Report 3	Aktürkoğlu (penalty missed) 37'; Icardi 42'; Ayhan (yellow card) 85'; Bardakcı (yellow card) 90+3'	Stadium: Atatürk Olympic Stadium; Attendance: 4,365; Referee: Abdülkadir Bitigen; Assistant referees: Volkan Ahmet Narinç, Mustafa Savranlar; Fourth official: Yiğit Arslan
Note: Turkish Football Federation announced that the league matches they will play at the weekend were postponed to a later date so that Turkish clubs playing in the UEFA Champions League and UEFA Europa Conference League would not be adversely affected by the busy match schedule.

2 September 2023 4	Gaziantep	0–3	Galatasaray	Şehitkamil, Gaziantep
21:45 TRT (UTC+3)	Ersoy (yellow card) 37'; Djilobodji (yellow card) 75'	Report 1 Report 2 Report 3	Aktürkoğlu 5'; Icardi 65', 73' (pen.)	Stadium: Gaziantep Stadium; Attendance: 23,510; Referee: Ali Şansalan; Assistant referees: Aleks Taşcıoğlu, Erdem Bayık; Fourth official: Direnç Tonusluoğlu

16 September 2023 5	Galatasaray	4–2	Samsunspor	Sarıyer, Istanbul
20:00 TRT (UTC+3)	Aktürkoğlu 7', 29'; Bardakcı 42'; Nelsson (yellow card) 45+2'; Icardi 67'	Report 1 Report 2 Report 3	Çift (yellow card) 13'; Dimata 46'; Tait (yellow card) 50'; Holse 60'; Bola (yellow card) 90+1'	Stadium: Rams Park; Attendance: 43,413; Referee: Cihan Aydın; Assistant referees: İbrahim Çağlar Uyarcan, Osman Gökhan Bilir; Fourth official: Murat Erdoğan

23 September 2023 6	İstanbul Başakşehir	1–2	Galatasaray	Başakşehir, Istanbul
20:00 TRT (UTC+3)	Dennis (yellow card) 12'; Özcan (yellow card) 19'; Lima (yellow card) 32'; Dubois 64'	Report 1 Report 2 Report 3	Oliveira (yellow card) 33'; Ziyech 43'; Icardi 50' (pen.); Demirbay (yellow card) 83'	Stadium: Başakşehir Fatih Terim Stadium; Attendance: 6,183; Referee: Kadir Sağlam; Assistant referees: Abdullah Bora Özkara, Hakan Yemişken; Fourth official: Ümit Öztürk

30 September 2023 7	Galatasaray	2–1	Ankaragücü	Sarıyer, Istanbul
19:00 TRT (UTC+3)	Zaha 56'; Bilazer 69' (o.g.)	Report 1 Report 2 Report 3	Moruțan (yellow card) 42'; Cephas 48'; Çetin (yellow card) 56'; Mujakić (yellow card) 85'	Stadium: Rams Park; Attendance: 41,513; Referee: Volkan Bayarslan; Assistant referees: Cevdet Kömürcüoğlu, Süleyman Özay; Fourth official: Turgut Doman

7 October 2023 8	Antalyaspor	0–2	Galatasaray	Muratpaşa, Antalya
19:00 TRT (UTC+3)	Vural (yellow card) 30'	Report 1 Report 2 Report 3	Torreira (yellow card) 18'; Muslera (yellow card) 26'; Sánchez 58'; Aktürkoğlu (yellow card) 75'; Icardi 86'	Stadium: Antalya Stadium; Attendance: 22,308; Referee: Zorbay Küçük; Assistant referees: Furkan Ürün, Murat Temel; Fourth official: Burak Pakkan

21 October 2023 9	Galatasaray	2–1	Beşiktaş	Sarıyer, Istanbul
19:00 TRT (UTC+3)	Sánchez (yellow card) 17'; Icardi 26', 82' (pen.); Bakambu (yellow card) 84'; Muslera (yellow card) 90+2'	Report 1 Report 2 Report 3	Amartey (yellow card) 17'; Bingöl (yellow card) 18'; Günok (red card) 30'; Hadžiahmetović (yellow card) 57'; Oxlade-Chamberlain 69'; Masuaku (yellow card) 76'; Rebić (yellow card) 89'; Ghezzal (yellow card) End of the match'	Stadium: Rams Park; Attendance: 50,429; Referee: Halil Umut Meler; Assistant referees: Mustafa Emre Eyisoy, Kerem Ersoy; Fourth official: Mert Güzenge

28 October 2023 10	Çaykur Rizespor	0–1	Galatasaray	Rize
19:00 TRT (UTC+3)	Zeqiri (yellow card) 62'; Sauer (yellow card) 86'; Şahin (yellow card) End of the match'	Report 1 Report 2 Report 3	Güvenç (yellow card) 26'; Oliveira 69'; Sánchez (yellow card) 89'; Ziyech (yellow card) 90+5'	Stadium: City of Rize Stadium; Attendance: 11,092; Referee: Kadir Sağlam; Assistant referees: Esat Sancaktar, İbrahim Bozbey; Fourth official: Çağdaş Altay

3 November 2023 11	Galatasaray	2–1	Kasımpaşa	Sarıyer, Istanbul
20:00 TRT (UTC+3)	Zaha 34', 52'; Boey (yellow card) 45+2'; Bardakcı (yellow card) 64'	Report 1 Report 2 Report 2	Fall (yellow card) 21'; Omeruo 54'; Winck (yellow card) 64'; Saddiki (yellow card) 90+5'	Stadium: Rams Park; Attendance: 44,411; Referee: Arda Kardeşler; Assistant referees: Mehmet Emin Tuğral, Deniz Caner Özaral; Fourth official: Burak Şeker

11 November 2023 12	Hatayspor	2–1	Galatasaray	Yenişehir, Mersin (Note: Turkish Football Federation announced that Hatayspor will play their new seasons matches in Mersin due to the 2023 Turkey–Syria earthquake.)
19:00 TRT (UTC+3)	Rivas 14'; Zé 55'; Aburjania (yellow card) 89'; Hodzic (yellow card) 90+6'	Report 1 Report 2 Report 3	Zaha 28'; Sánchez (yellow card) 35'	Stadium: Mersin Arena; Attendance: 20,573; Referee: Bahattin Şimşek; Assistant referees: İbrahim Çağlar Uyarcan, Kamil Çetin; Fourth official: Mert Güzenge

25 November 2023 13	Galatasaray	4–0	Alanyaspor	Sarıyer, Istanbul
19:00 TRT (UTC+3)	Icardi 27'; Yılmaz (yellow card) 38'; Mertens 45+1', 59'; Zaha 69'	Report 1 Report 2 Report 3	Lima (yellow card) 31'	Stadium: Rams Park; Attendance: 43,470; Referee: Ali Şansalan; Assistant referees: Serkan Olguncan, Serkan Ok; Fourth official: Yiğit Arslan

2 December 2023 14	Pendikspor	0–2	Galatasaray	Pendik, Istanbul
19:00 TRT (UTC+3)	Vuković (yellow card) 74'; Çekiçi (yellow card) 90+1'	Report 1 Report 2 Report 3	Torreira (yellow card) 24'; Oliveira (yellow card) 45+1'; Bakambu 69'; Ziyech 82'; Boey (yellow card) 90+5'	Stadium: Pendik Stadium; Attendance: 1,405; Referee: Volkan Bayarslan; Assistant referees: Süleyman Özay, Aleks Taşcıoğlu; Fourth official: Direnç Tonusluoğlu

8 December 2023 15	Galatasaray	3–1	Adana Demirspor	Sarıyer, Istanbul
20:00 TRT (UTC+3)	Boey 22'; Aktürkoğlu 29'; Tetê (yellow card) 37'; Muslera (yellow card) 45+3'; Icardi 90+5' (pen.)	Report 1 Report 2 Report 3	Niang 45+4' (pen.)	Stadium: Rams Park; Attendance: 45,560; Referee: Abdulkadir Bitigen; Assistant referees: Erdem Bayık, Mustafa Savranlar; Fourth official: Burak Pakkan

11 January 2024 16	Sivasspor	1–1	Galatasaray	Sivas
17:00 TRT (UTC+3)	Koita 86' (pen.)	Report 1 Report 2 Report 3	Demirbay (yellow card) 27' (goal) 45+1'; Aktürkoğlu (yellow card) 85' (yellow-red card) 90'	Stadium: New Sivas 4 Eylül Stadium; Attendance: 5,012; Referee: Zorbay Küçük; Assistant referees: Mustafa Emre Eyisoy, Murat Tuğberk Curbay; Fourth official: Turgut Doman
Note: It was announced that the match, which was planned to be played on 16 December by the Turkish Football Federation, was postponed to a later date after the attack on referee Halil Umut Meler on 11 December.

20 December 2023 17	Galatasaray	1–0	Fatih Karagümrük	Sarıyer, Istanbul
20:00 TRT (UTC+3)	Ziyech (yellow card) 26'; Aktürkoğlu 40'; Torreira (yellow card) 69'; Yılmaz (yellow card) 72'	Report 1 Report 2 Report 3	Rohdén (yellow card) 12'; Mendes (yellow card) 45'; Paoletti (yellow card) 84'	Stadium: Rams Park; Attendance: 38,587; Referee: Tugay Kaan Numanoğlu; Assistant referees: Ceyhun Sesigüzel, Candaş Elbil; Fourth official: Mert Güzenge

24 December 2023 18	Fenerbahçe	0–0	Galatasaray	Kadıköy, Istanbul
19:00 TRT (UTC+3)	Osayi-Samuel (yellow card) 12'; Kahveci (yellow card) 57'; King (yellow card) 72'	Report 1 Report 2 Report 3	Torreira (yellow card) 63'; Boey (yellow card) 72'; Ziyech (yellow card) 85'; Aktürkoğlu (yellow card) 90+1'	Stadium: Şükrü Saracoğlu Stadium; Attendance: 45,401; Referee: Arda Kardeşler; Assistant referees: Mehmet Emin Tuğral, Süleyman Özay; Fourth official: Cihan Aydın

7 January 2024 19	Galatasaray	3–0	Konyaspor	Sarıyer, Istanbul
19:00 TRT (UTC+3)	Bardakcı (yellow card) 36' (goal) 63', 90+3'; Yılmaz (yellow card) 79'; Ayhan (yellow card) 81'; Zaha 90'	Report 1 Report 2 Report 3	Oliveira (yellow card) 51'; Demirbağ (yellow card) 62'; Calvo (yellow card) 63'	Stadium: Rams Park; Attendance: 36,340; Referee: Ali Şansalan; Assistant referees: Serkan Ok, Serkan Olguncan; Fourth official: Muhammet Ali Metoğlu

15 January 2024 20	Galatasaray	2–1	Kayserispor	Sarıyer, Istanbul
20:00 TRT (UTC+3)	Nelsson 26'; Mertens (yellow card) 52' (goal) 86' (pen.)	Report 1 Report 2 Report 3	Karimi (yellow card) 32'; Bahoken (penalty missed) 45'; Özbek (yellow card) 45+4'; Boa Morte 57'; Sazdağı (yellow card) 71'; Kocaman (yellow card) 80'; Kaldırım (yellow card) 85'; Civelek (yellow card) End of the match'	Stadium: Rams Park; Attendance: 33,859; Referee: Atilla Karaoğlan; Assistant referees: Cevdet Kömürcüoğlu, Abdullah Bora Özkara; Fourth official: Oğuzhan Çakır

21 January 2024 21	Trabzonspor	1–5	Galatasaray	Trabzon
19:00 TRT (UTC+3)	Baniya (yellow card) 38'; Destan 79'	Report 1 Report 2 Report 3	Zaha 13', 61'; Torreira (yellow card) 50'; Ayhan 64'; Bardakcı (yellow card) 66'; Nelsson (yellow card) 73'; Aktürkoğlu 81', 90+6'; Yılmaz (yellow card) 90+3'	Stadium: Şenol Güneş Sports Complex; Attendance: 36,352; Referee: Abdulkadir Bitigen; Assistant referees: Erdem Bayık, Mustafa Savranlar; Fourth official: Mert Güzenge

25 January 2024 22	Galatasaray	3–1	İstanbulspor	Sarıyer, Istanbul
20:00 TRT (UTC+3)	Aktürkoğlu 36' (pen.), 79' (yellow card) 39'; Zaha (yellow card) 45+3'; Icardi 90+2' (pen.)	Report 1 Report 2 Report 3	Sambissa 28'; Sarıkaya (yellow card) 34'; Erdoğan (yellow card) 45+3'; Gültekin (yellow card) 45+3'; Loshaj (yellow card) 62'; Arda (yellow card) 75'; Mamadou (red card) 89'	Stadium: Rams Park; Attendance: 39,017; Referee: Bahattin Şimşek; Assistant referees: Kamil Çetin, Murat Altan; Fourth official: Direnç Tonusluoğlu

29 January 2024 23	Galatasaray	2–1	Gaziantep	Sarıyer, Istanbul
20:00 TRT (UTC+3)	Kutlu (yellow card) 45'; Zaha 72'; Yılmaz 89'	Report 1 Report 2 Report 3	Kızıldağ 29' (yellow card) 90+1'; Drăguș (yellow card) 35'; Soyalp (yellow card) 40'; Sorescu (yellow card) 43'; Jevtović (yellow card) 76'	Stadium: Rams Park; Attendance: 36,058; Referee: Arda Kardeşler; Assistant referees: Mehmet Emin Tuğral, Esat Sancaktar; Fourth official: Muhammet Ali Metoğlu

2 February 2024 24	Samsunspor	0–2	Galatasaray	Tekkeköy, Samsun
20:00 TRT (UTC+3)	Öztürk (yellow card) 73'; Yavru (yellow card) 90+3'	Report 1 Report 2 Report 3	Nelsson 4'; Yılmaz 11'; Zaha (yellow card) 90+3'	Stadium: Samsun 19 Mayıs Stadium; Attendance: 12,922; Referee: Tugay Kaan Numanoğlu; Assistant referees: Aleks Taşcıoğlu, Mustafa Sönmez; Fourth official: Abdullah Buğra Taşkınsoy

10 February 2024 25	Galatasaray	2–0	İstanbul Başakşehir	Sarıyer, Istanbul
19:00 TRT (UTC+3)	Mertens (yellow card) 1' (goal) 31'; Yılmaz 25' (yellow card) 83'	Report 1 Report 2 Report 3	Souza (yellow card) 36'; Lima (yellow card) 90+2'	Stadium: Rams Park; Attendance: 45,811; Referee: Cihan Aydın; Assistant referees: Kerem Ersoy, Cevdet Kömürcüoğlu; Fourth official: Turgut Doman

18 February 2024 26	Ankaragücü	0–3	Galatasaray	Eryaman, Ankara
19:00 TRT (UTC+3)	Kitsiou (yellow card) 73'	Report 1 Report 2 Report 3	Demirbay 13'; Sánchez 14'; Icardi 39' (pen.); Köhn (yellow card) 59'	Stadium: Eryaman Stadium; Attendance: 16,825; Referee: Ali Şansalan; Assistant referees: Serkan Ok, Samet Çiçek; Fourth official: Mert Güzenge

26 February 2024 27	Galatasaray	2–1	Antalyaspor	Sarıyer, Istanbul
20:00 TRT (UTC+3)	Aktürkoğlu 12' (pen.), 45+1' (penalty missed) 59'; Torreira (yellow card) 45+7'; Ayhan (yellow card) 90+1'	Report 1 Report 2 Report 3	Sarı (yellow card) 17'; Vural (yellow card) 18'; van de Streek 33'; Yeşilyurt (yellow card) 60'; Buksa (yellow card) 90'	Stadium: Rams Park; Attendance: 41,737; Referee: Abdülkadir Bitigen; Assistant referees: Anıl Usta, Mustafa Savranlar; Fourth official: Direnç Tonusluoğlu

3 March 2024 28	Beşiktaş	0–1	Galatasaray	Beşiktaş, Istanbul
19:00 TRT (UTC+3)	Tosun (yellow card) 55'; Colley (red card) 90'; Ghezzal (yellow card) 90+7'	Report 1 Report 2 Report 3	Musrati 2' (o.g.)	Stadium: Beşiktaş Stadium; Attendance: 39,558; Referee: Halil Umut Meler; Assistant referees: Mustafa Emre Eyisoy, Kerem Ersoy; Fourth official: Bahattin Şimşek

8 March 2024 29	Galatasaray	6–2	Çaykur Rizespor	Sarıyer, Istanbul
20:00 TRT (UTC+3)	Köhn 9'; Icardi (yellow card) 22' (goal) 85'; Torreira 31'; Demirbay 40', 45', 64' (pen.)	Report 1 Report 2 Report 3	Topçu (yellow card) 36'; Højer 38'; Olawoyin 61'	Stadium: Rams Park; Attendance: 42,718; Referee: Bahattin Şimşek; Assistant referees: Serkan Olguncan, Osman Gökhan Bilir; Fourth official: Burak Şeker

17 March 2024 30	Kasımpaşa	3–4	Galatasaray	Kasımpaşa, Istanbul
16:00 TRT (UTC+3)	Ben Ouanes (yellow card) 14'; Omeruo (yellow card) 29'; Icardi 34' (o.g.); Gül (yellow card) 53'; Kara 57' (yellow card) 70'; da Costa 77'; Winck (red card) 79'	Report 1 Report 2 Report 3	Mertens 27'; Icardi 48', 83' (penalty missed) 81; Vinícius 90' (yellow card) 90+5'	Stadium: Recep Tayyip Erdoğan Stadium; Attendance: 7,454; Referee: Atilla Karaoğlan; Assistant referees: Cevdet Kömürcüoğlu, Abdullah Bora Özkara; Fourth official: Turgut Doman

2 April 2024 31	Galatasaray	1–0	Hatayspor	Sarıyer, Istanbul
20:30 TRT (UTC+3)	Icardi 13'; Nelsson (yellow card) 82'; Vinícius (yellow card) 90+1'	Report 1 Report 2 Report 3	Rivas (yellow card) 45+2'; Beyaz (yellow card) 45+3'	Stadium: Rams Park; Attendance: 41,220; Referee: Ali Şansalan; Assistant referees: Aleks Taşcıoğlu, Mehmet Kısal; Fourth official: Mehmet Türkmen

15 April 2024 32	Alanyaspor	0–4	Galatasaray	Alanya, Antalya
20:00 TRT (UTC+3)	Fer (yellow card) 46' (yellow-red card) 65'	Report 1 Report 2 Report 3	Yılmaz 56', 72'; Ziyech 61'; Icardi 83'	Stadium: Alanya Oba Stadium; Attendance: 6,762; Referee: Cihan Aydın; Assistant referees: Deniz Caner Özaral, Hakan Yemişken; Fourth official: Çağdaş Altay

21 April 2024 33	Galatasaray	4–1	Pendikspor	Sarıyer, Istanbul
19:00 TRT (UTC+3)	Icardi 35'; Bardakcı 40'; Torreira (yellow card) 45+1'; Mertens 77'; Aktürkoğlu 90+6' (pen.)	Report 1 Report 2 Report 3	Akça (yellow card) 44'; Öztürk 85'; Canpolat (yellow card) 90+2'	Stadium: Rams Park; Attendance: 48,689; Referee: Direnç Tonusluoğlu; Assistant referees: İbrahim Çağlar Uyarcan, Aleks Taşcıoğlu; Fourth official: Turgut Doman

26 April 2024 34	Adana Demirspor	0–3	Galatasaray	Sarıçam, Adana
20:00 TRT (UTC+3)	Mendoza (yellow card) 89'; Gravillon (yellow card) 90+2'	Report 1 Report 2 Report 3	Ziyech 53'; Demirbay 64'; Icardi 90+1'	Stadium: New Adana Stadium; Attendance: 24,620; Referee: Bahattin Şimşek; Assistant referees: Süleyman Özay, Osman Gökhan Bilir; Fourth official: Burak Şeker

5 May 2024 35	Galatasaray	6–1	Sivasspor	Sarıyer, Istanbul
19:00 TRT (UTC+3)	Ziyech 11', 60'; Mertens 38', 73'; Icardi 59', 85'	Report 1 Report 2 Report 3	Çiftçi (yellow card) 28'; Osmanpaşa 54'; Camara (yellow card) 90'; Manaj (yellow card) 90+1'	Stadium: Rams Park; Attendance: 48,892; Referee: Arda Kardeşler; Assistant referees: Esat Sancaktar, Serkan Olguncan; Fourth official: Burak Pakkan

12 May 2024 36	Fatih Karagümrük	2–3	Galatasaray	Başakşehir, Istanbul
19:00 TRT (UTC+3)	Mendes 34'; Marcão 84'	Report 1 Report 2 Report 3	Yılmaz 45+4'; Mertens 70'; Kutlu 90'	Stadium: Atatürk Olympic Stadium; Attendance: 25,731; Referee: Volkan Bayarslan; Assistant referees: Serkan Ok, Samet Çiçek; Fourth official: Çağdaş Altay

19 May 2024 37	Galatasaray	0–1	Fenerbahçe	Sarıyer, Istanbul
19:00 TRT (UTC+3)	Mertens (yellow card) 5'; Yılmaz (yellow card) 13'; Ziyech (yellow card) 59'; Kutlu (yellow card) 88'	Report 1 Report 2 Report 3	Djiku (yellow card) 12' (yellow-red card) 23'; Osayi-Samuel (yellow card) 13'; Batshuayi (yellow card) 34'; Yandaş (yellow card) 65'; Söyüncü 71'; Livaković (yellow card) 86'; Fred (yellow card) 90+4'	Stadium: Rams Park; Attendance: 53,755; Referee: Arda Kardeşler; Assistant referees: Mehmet Emin Tuğral, Süleyman Özay; Fourth official: Direnç Tonusluoğlu

26 May 2024 38	Konyaspor	1–3	Galatasaray	Selçuklu, Konya
19:00 TRT (UTC+3)	Ndao (yellow card) 45+2'; Ülgün (yellow card) 56'; Prip 78'	Report 1 Report 2 Report 3	Icardi 29', 51'; Sánchez (yellow card) 33'; Kutlu 53'; Yılmaz (yellow card) 56'	Stadium: Konya Metropolitan Municipality Stadium; Referee: Tugay Kaan Numanoğlu; Assistant referees: Murat Tuğberk Curbay, Candaş Elbil; Fourth official: Muhammet Ali Metoğlu

=== Turkish Cup ===
==== Fifth round ====
18 January 2024 Fifth round	Galatasaray	4–1	Ümraniyespor	Sarıyer, Istanbul
21:00 TRT (UTC+3)	Yılmaz (yellow card) 10' (goal) 33'; Tetê 45'; Bardakcı 57'; Dervişoğlu 87' (pen.)	Report 1 Report 2 Report 3	Yılmaz 23' (o.g.); Bouali (yellow card) 36'; Nas (yellow card) 59' (yellow-red card) 67'; Yıldız (yellow card) 61'	Stadium: Rams Park; Attendance: 25,805; Referee: Burak Pakkan; Assistant referees: Serkan Çimen, Anıl Usta; Fourth official: Ömer Faruk Turtay

==== Round of 16 ====
6 February 2024 Round of 16	Galatasaray	4–2	Bandırmaspor	Sarıyer, Istanbul
20:45 TRT (UTC+3)	Sánchez 27'; Dervişoğlu 36' (pen.); Tetê 41' (pen.); Aydın (yellow card) 58'; Vinícius 90+5'	Report 1 Report 2 Report 3	Özcan (yellow card) 36'; Piçinciol 45+3'; Alkan (yellow card) 67'; Mulumba 77'	Stadium: Rams Park; Referee: Muhammet Ali Metoğlu; Assistant referees: Mehmet Salih Mazlum, Murat Ergin Gözütok; Fourth official: Mehmet Türkmen

==== Quarter-finals ====
29 February 2024 Quarter-finals	Galatasaray	0–2	Fatih Karagümrük	Sarıyer, Istanbul
20:45 TRT (UTC+3)	Nelsson (yellow card) 56'	Report 1 Report 2 Report 3	Marcão 6'; Veseli (yellow card) 49'; Mendes 84'	Stadium: Rams Park; Referee: Arda Kardeşler; Assistant referees: Mehmet Emin Tuğral, İbrahim Çağlar Uyarcan; Fourth official: Oğuzhan Çakır

=== Turkish Super Cup ===
7 April 2024 Final	Galatasaray	3–0	Fenerbahçe	Haliliye, Şanlıurfa
21:30 TRT (UTC+3)	Icardi 1'	Report 1 Report 2 Report 3		Stadium: 11 Nisan Stadium; Referee: Volkan Bayarslan; Assistant referees: Serkan Olguncan, Serkan Ok; Fourth official: Burak Şeker
Note: The first location was planned to be played in Riyadh, but Saudi authorities refused permission for Fenerbahçe and Galatasaray to use banners and warm up in Mustafa Kemal Atatürk-themed t-shirts during the match opening ceremony in Riyadh. Both sides refused to play, resulting in the cancellation of the match.

Fenerbahçe has been sanctioned with a forfeit with a 3–0 loss of the game.

=== UEFA Champions League ===
==== Second qualifying round ====
25 July 2023 First leg	Žalgiris (Lithuania)	2–2	(Turkey) Galatasaray	Vilnius, Lithuania
19:00 EEST (UTC+3)	Gorobsov (yellow card) 29'; Oyewusi 48'; Hnid (yellow card) 76'; Kazlauskas 90+2' (yellow card) 80' (yellow-red card) 90+2'	Report 1 Report 2 Report 3	Kutlu (yellow card) 12'; Bardakcı 75'; Dervişoğlu 78'	Stadium: LFF Stadium; Attendance: 4,864; Referee: Luís Godinho (Portugal); Assistant referees: Rui Teixeira (Portugal), Pedro Almeida (Portugal); Fourth official: Ricardo Baixinho (Portugal)

2 August 2023 Second leg	Galatasaray (Turkey)	1–0 (3–2 agg.)	(Lithuania) Žalgiris	Sarıyer, Istanbul, Turkey
21:30 TRT (UTC+3)	Mertens 31' (yellow card) 62'; Ayhan (yellow card) 90+1'	Report 1 Report 2 Report 3	Bopesu (yellow card) 5'; Oyewusi (yellow card) 56'; Hnid (yellow card) 76'	Stadium: Rams Park; Attendance: 41,505; Referee: Willy Delajod (France); Assistant referees: Erwan Finjean (France), Cyril Mugnier (France); Fourth official: Thomas Léonard (France)

==== Third qualifying round ====
8 August 2023 First leg	Olimpija Ljubljana (Slovenia)	0–3	(Turkey) Galatasaray	Ljubljana, Slovenia
21:00 EEST (UTC+3)	Motika (yellow card) 54'; Jakupović (yellow card) 90'	Report 1 Report 2 Report 2	Aktürkoğlu 9'; Oliveira (yellow card) 42'; Mertens 48'; Dervişoğlu 90+1' (yellow card) 90+4'	Stadium: Stožice Stadium; Attendance: 13,712; Referee: Andreas Ekberg (Sweden); Assistant referees: Marcus Lundgren Klitte (Sweden), Niklas Nyberg (Sweden); Fourth official: Granit Maqedonci (Sweden)

15 August 2023 Second leg	Galatasaray (Turkey)	1–0 (4–0 agg.)	(Slovenia) Olimpija Ljubljana	Sarıyer, Istanbul, Turkey
21:00 TRT (UTC+3)	Icardi 24'; Boey (yellow card) 29'; Torreira (red card) 64'	Report 1 Report 2 Report 3	Posavec (yellow card) 7'; Sualehe (yellow card) 31'	Stadium: Rams Park; Attendance: 38,383; Referee: Marco Guida (Italy); Assistant referees: Ciro Carbone (Italy), Alessio Berti (Italy); Fourth official: Matteo Marcenaro (Italy)

==== Play-off round ====
23 August 2023 First leg	Molde (Norway)	2–3	(Turkey) Galatasaray	Molde, Norway
22:00 EEST (UTC+3)	Ellingsen 8'; Mannsverk (yellow card) 39'; Haugen 56'; Haugan (yellow card) 80'; Breivik (yellow card) 86'	Report 1 Report 2 Report 3	Oliveira 25'; Icardi 29'; Angeliño (yellow card) 85'; Midtsjø 90+3'	Stadium: Aker Stadion; Attendance: 9,553; Referee: Anthony Taylor (England); Assistant referees: Stuart Burt (England), Lee Betts (England); Fourth official: Robert Jones (England)

29 August 2023 Second leg	Galatasaray (Turkey)	2–1 (5–3 agg.)	(Norway) Molde	Sarıyer, Istanbul, Turkey
22:00 TRT (UTC+3)	Icardi 7' (pen.); Bardakcı (yellow card) 45+5'; Yılmaz (yellow card) 74'; Angeliño 90+3'	Report 1 Report 2 Report 3	Ellingsen (yellow card) 5'; Hestad 66'; Mannsverk (yellow card) 85'; Berisha (yellow card) 90+7'	Stadium: Rams Park; Attendance: 47,845; Referee: Szymon Marciniak (Poland); Assistant referees: Tomasz Listkiewicz (Poland), Adam Kupsik (Poland); Fourth official: Tomasz Musiał (Poland)

==== Group stage ====
The group stage draw was held on 31 August 2023.

Pos	Team	Pld	W	D	L	GF	GA	GD	Pts	Qualification	BAY	CPH	GAL	MUN
1	(Germany) Bayern Munich	6	5	1	0	12	6	+6	16	Advance to knockout phase	—	0–0	2–1	4–3
2	(Denmark) Copenhagen	6	2	2	2	8	8	0	8	Advance to knockout phase	1–2	—	1–0	4–3
3	(Turkey) Galatasaray	6	1	2	3	10	13	−3	5	Transfer to Europa League	1–3	2–2	—	3–3
4	(England) Manchester United	6	1	1	4	12	15	−3	4		0–1	1–0	2–3	—

Source: UEFA
Rules for classification: Group stage tiebreakers

20 September 2023 1	Galatasaray (Turkey)	2–2	(Denmark) Copenhagen	Sarıyer, Istanbul, Turkey
18:45 (19:45 TRT)	Ziyech (yellow card) 39'; Oliveira (yellow card) 77'; Boey 86'; Tetê 88'	Report 1 Report 2 Report 3	Lerager (yellow card) 11'; Elyounoussi 35'; Jelert (yellow card) 52' (yellow-red card) 73'; Gonçalves 58'; Diks (yellow card) 73'; Meling (yellow card) 82'	Stadium: Rams Park; Attendance: 46,911; Referee: Georgi Kabakov (Bulgaria); Assistant referees: Martin Margaritov (Bulgaria), Diyan Valkov (Bulgaria); Fourth official: Georgi Ginchev (Bulgaria); Man of the Match: Tetê

3 October 2023 2	Manchester United (England)	2–3	(Turkey) Galatasaray	Manchester, England
21:00 (20:00 BST)	Højlund 17', 67'; Casemiro (yellow card) 35' (yellow-red card) 77'; Dalot (yellow card) 38'	Report 1 Report 2 Report 3 Report 4	Zaha 23'; Torreira (yellow card) 31'; Boey (yellow card) 61'; Aktürkoğlu 71'; Icardi (penalty missed) 78'; Icardi 81'; Oliveira (yellow card) 86'	Stadium: Old Trafford; Attendance: 73,204; Referee: Ivan Kružliak (Slovakia); Assistant referees: Branislav Hancko (Slovakia), Jan Pozor (Slovakia); Fourth official: Peter Kralović (Slovakia); Man of the Match: Højlund

24 October 2023 3	Galatasaray (Turkey)	1–3	(Germany) Bayern Munich	Sarıyer, Istanbul, Turkey
18:45 (19:45 TRT)	Icardi 30' (pen.); Tetê (yellow card) 53'; Ayhan (yellow card) 62'	Report 1 Report 2 Report 3	Coman 8'; Sané (yellow card) 14'; Laimer (yellow card) 32'; Kane 73'; Musiala 79'; Davies (yellow card) 90+5'	Stadium: Rams Park; Attendance: 51,792; Referee: Davide Massa (Italy); Assistant referees: Filippo Meli (Italy), Stefano Alassio (Italy); Fourth official: Daniele Chiffi (Italy); Man of the Match: Coman

8 November 2023 4	Bayern Munich (Germany)	2–1	(Turkey) Galatasaray	Munich, Germany
21:00 CET	Davies (yellow card) 19'; Kane 80', 86'	Report 1 Report 2 Report 2	Bardakcı (yellow card) 34'; Bakambu 90+3' (yellow card) 90+6'	Stadium: Allianz Arena; Attendance: 75,000; Referee: António Nobre (Portugal); Assistant referees: Pedro Martins (Portugal), Paulo Brás (Portugal); Fourth official: André Narciso (Portugal); Man of the Match: Kane
Note: Manager Okan Buruk were both cautioned (yellow card) in the 60nd minute.

29 November 2023 5	Galatasaray (Turkey)	3–3	(England) Manchester United	Sarıyer, Istanbul, Turkey
18:45 (20:45 TRT)	Ziyech 29', 62'; Boey (yellow card) 42'; Ayhan (yellow card) 54'; Aktürkoğlu 71'	Report 1 Report 2 Report 3	Garnacho 11'; Fernandes 18' (yellow card) 27'; Amrabat (yellow card) 45+2'; McTominay 55'; Shaw (yellow card) 59'; Wan-Bissaka (yellow card) 64'	Stadium: Rams Park; Attendance: 51,741; Referee: José María Sánchez Martínez (Spain); Assistant referees: Raúl Cabañero (Spain), Iñigo Prieto (Spain); Fourth official: Guillermo Cuadra (Spain); Man of the Match: Ziyech

12 December 2023 6	Copenhagen (Denmark)	1–0	(Turkey) Galatasaray	Copenhagen, Denmark
21:00 CET	Jelert (yellow card) 37'; Lerager 58' (yellow card) 85' (yellow-red card) 90'	Report 1 Report 2 Report 3	Zaha (yellow card) 55'	Stadium: Parken Stadium; Attendance: 34,726; Referee: Daniele Orsato (Italy); Assistant referees: Ciro Carbone (Italy), Alessandro Giallatini (Italy); Fourth official: Michael Fabbri (Italy); Man of the Match: Falk

=== UEFA Europa League ===
==== Knockout phase ====
===== Knockout round play-offs =====
The draw for the knockout round play-offs was held on 18 December 2023.

15 February 2024 First leg	Galatasaray (Turkey)	3–2	(Czech Republic) Sparta Prague	Sarıyer, Istanbul, Turkey
20:45 TRT	Demirbay 19'; Yılmaz (yellow card) 47'; Mertens 61'; Nelsson (red card) 62'; Aktürkoğlu (yellow card) 82'; Icardi 90+1'	Report 1 Report 2 Report 3	Laçi (yellow card) 41'; Preciado 47'; Ryneš (yellow card) 50' (yellow-red card) 80'; Kuchta 65'; Birmančević (yellow card) 79'; Krejčí (yellow card) 82'	Stadium: Rams Park; Attendance: 46,802; Referee: Alejandro Hernández (Spain); Assistant referees: José Naranjo (Spain), Diego Sanchez Rojo (Spain); Fourth official: Alejandro Muñiz Ruiz (Spain)

22 February 2024 Second leg	Sparta Prague (Czech Republic)	4–1 (6–4 agg.)	(Turkey) Galatasaray	Prague, Czech Republic
21:00 CET	Preciado 8'; Sørensen (yellow card) 31'; Tuci 74'; Kuchta (yellow card) 76' (goal) 90+6'; Haraslín 80'; Preciado (yellow card) 85'	Report 1 Report 2 Report 3	Bardakcı 16'; Demirbay (yellow card) 22'; Kutlu (yellow card) 24'; Ayhan (red card) 68'; Vinícius (yellow card) 90+7'	Stadium: Stadion Letná; Attendance: 18,205; Referee: Anthony Taylor (England); Assistant referees: Gary Beswick (England), Adam Nunn (England); Fourth official: John Brooks (England)

== Starting 11 ==

=== Appearances and goals ===
Includes all competitions for senior teams.

No.	Pos	Nat	Player	Total		Süper Lig		Turkish Cup		Turkish Super Cup		Champions League		Europa League	
No.	Pos	Nat	Player	Apps	Goals	Apps	Goals	Apps	Goals	Apps	Goals	Apps	Goals	Apps	Goals
Goalkeepers
1	GK	(Uruguay) URU	Fernando Muslera	52	0	37	0	0	0	1	0	12	0	2	0
12	GK	(Turkey) TUR	Atakan Nuri Ordu	0	0	0	0	0	0	0	0	0	0	0	0
19	GK	(Turkey) TUR	Günay Güvenç	5	0	2	0	3	0	0	0	0	0	0	0
50	GK	(Turkey) TUR	Jankat Yılmaz	0	0	0	0	0	0	0	0	0	0	0	0
Defenders
6	DF	(Colombia) COL	Davinson Sánchez	32	3	23	2	3	1	0	0	4	0	2	0
17	DF	(Germany) GER	Derrick Köhn	15	1	13	1	1	0	1	0	0	0	0	0
23	DF	(Turkey) TUR	Kaan Ayhan	49	1	35	1	1	0	1	0	10	0	2	0
25	DF	(Denmark) DEN	Victor Nelsson	46	2	32	2	3	0	1	0	9	0	1	0
42	DF	(Turkey) TUR	Abdülkerim Bardakcı	44	7	27	4	2	1	1	0	12	1	2	1
58	DF	(Turkey) TUR	Ali Yeşilyurt	1	0	0	0	1	0	0	0	0	0	0	0
72	DF	(Turkey) TUR	Ali Turap Bülbül	5	0	3	0	2	0	0	0	0	0	0	0
92	DF	(Ivory Coast) CIV	Serge Aurier	4	0	4	0	0	0	0	0	0	0	0	0
Midfielders
5	MF	(Germany) GER	Eyüp Aydın	12	0	10	0	2	0	0	0	0	0	0	0
7	MF	(Turkey) TUR	Kerem Aktürkoğlu	54	15	37	12	2	0	1	0	12	3	2	0
8	MF	(Germany) GER	Kerem Demirbay	42	7	34	6	2	0	0	0	4	0	2	1
14	MF	(Ivory Coast) CIV	Wilfried Zaha	42	10	30	9	3	0	0	0	7	1	2	0
18	MF	(Turkey) TUR	Berkan Kutlu	32	2	20	2	3	0	1	0	6	0	2	0
20	MF	(Brazil) BRA	Tetê	45	3	33	0	3	2	0	0	7	1	2	0
22	MF	(Morocco) MAR	Hakim Ziyech	23	8	18	6	0	0	0	0	5	2	0	0
27	MF	(Portugal) POR	Sérgio Oliveira	24	2	12	1	1	0	0	0	10	1	1	0
33	MF	(Turkey) TUR	Gökdeniz Gürpüz	1	0	0	0	1	0	0	0	0	0	0	0
34	MF	(Uruguay) URU	Lucas Torreira	47	1	35	1	1	0	1	0	8	0	2	0
53	MF	(Turkey) TUR	Barış Alper Yılmaz	55	7	37	6	3	1	1	0	12	0	2	0
81	MF	(Turkey) TUR	Hamza Akman	1	0	0	0	1	0	0	0	0	0	0	0
83	MF	(Turkey) TUR	Efe Akman	2	0	1	0	1	0	0	0	0	0	0	0
91	MF	(France) FRA	Tanguy Ndombele	26	0	19	0	2	0	0	0	4	0	1	0
Forwards
9	FW	(Argentina) ARG	Mauro Icardi	47	32	34	25	0	0	1	1	10	5	2	1
10	FW	(Belgium) BEL	Dries Mertens	51	12	36	9	1	0	1	0	11	2	2	1
56	FW	(Turkey) TUR	Baran Demiroğlu	2	0	2	0	0	0	0	0	0	0	0	0
95	FW	(Brazil) BRA	Carlos Vinícius	14	2	10	1	2	1	0	0	0	0	2	0
Players transferred/loaned out during the season
2	DF	(France) FRA	Léo Dubois	3	0	1	0	0	0	0	0	2	0	0	0
3	DF	(Spain) ESP	Angeliño	19	1	8	0	0	0	0	0	11	1	0	0
6	MF	(Norway) NOR	Fredrik Midtsjø	3	1	0	0	0	0	0	0	3	1	0	0
11	MF	(Turkey) TUR	Yunus Akgün	5	0	1	0	0	0	0	0	4	0	0	0
17	MF	(Italy) ITA	Nicolò Zaniolo	1	0	0	0	0	0	0	0	1	0	0	0
21	FW	(Turkey) TUR	Halil Dervişoğlu	20	4	14	0	2	2	0	0	4	2	0	0
40	DF	(Turkey) TUR	Emin Bayram	1	0	0	0	0	0	0	0	1	0	0	0
63	MF	(Turkey) TUR	Baran Aksaka	0	0	0	0	0	0	0	0	0	0	0	0
80	MF	(Romania) ROU	Olimpiu Moruțan	2	0	0	0	0	0	0	0	2	0	0	0
88	DF	(Turkey) TUR	Kazımcan Karataş	12	0	8	0	2	0	0	0	2	0	0	0
93	DF	(France) FRA	Sacha Boey	31	2	19	1	0	0	0	0	12	1	0	0
94	FW	(Democratic Republic of the Congo) COD	Cédric Bakambu	16	2	10	1	0	0	0	0	6	1	0	0

Source: FBref.com, Mackolik.com

=== Goalscorers ===
Includes all competitions for senior teams. The list is sorted by squad number when season-total goals are equal. Players with no goals not included in the list.

Rank	No.	Pos	Nat	Name	Süper Lig	Turkish Cup	Turkish Super Cup	Champions League	Europa League	Total
1	9	FW	(Argentina)	Mauro Icardi	25	0	1	5	1	32
2	7	MF	(Turkey)	Kerem Aktürkoğlu	12	0	0	3	0	15
3	10	FW	(Belgium)	Dries Mertens	9	0	0	2	1	12
4	14	MF	(Ivory Coast)	Wilfried Zaha	9	0	0	1	0	10
5	22	MF	(Morocco)	Hakim Ziyech	6	0	0	2	0	8
6	8	MF	(Germany)	Kerem Demirbay	6	0	0	0	1	7
6	42	DF	(Turkey)	Abdülkerim Bardakcı	4	1	0	1	1	7
6	53	MF	(Turkey)	Barış Alper Yılmaz	6	1	0	0	0	7
9	21	FW	(Turkey)	Halil Dervişoğlu	0	2	0	2	0	4
10	6	DF	(Colombia)	Davinson Sánchez	2	1	0	0	0	3
10	20	MF	(Brazil)	Tetê	0	2	0	1	0	3
12	18	MF	(Turkey)	Berkan Kutlu	2	0	0	0	0	2
12	25	DF	(Denmark)	Victor Nelsson	2	0	0	0	0	2
12	27	MF	(Portugal)	Sérgio Oliveira	1	0	0	1	0	2
12	93	DF	(France)	Sacha Boey	1	0	0	1	0	2
12	94	FW	(Democratic Republic of the Congo)	Cédric Bakambu	1	0	0	1	0	2
12	95	FW	(Brazil)	Carlos Vinícius	1	1	0	0	0	2
18	3	DF	(Spain)	Angeliño	0	0	0	1	0	1
18	6	MF	(Norway)	Fredrik Midtsjø	0	0	0	1	0	1
18	17	DF	(Germany)	Derrick Köhn	1	0	0	0	0	1
18	23	DF	(Turkey)	Kaan Ayhan	1	0	0	0	0	1
18	34	MF	(Uruguay)	Lucas Torreira	1	0	0	0	0	1
Own goals					2	0	0	0	0	2
Awarded					0	0	2	0	0	2
Totals					92	8	3	22	4	129

Source: FBref.com, Mackolik.com

=== Hat-tricks ===
Player	Against	Result	Date	Competition	Ref
(Germany) Kerem Demirbay	Çaykur Rizespor	6–2 (H)	8 March 2024	Süper Lig	

(H) – Home; (A) – Away

=== Assists ===
Includes all competitions for senior teams. The list is sorted by squad number when season-total assists are equal. Players with no assists not included in the list.

Rank	No.	Pos	Nat	Name	Süper Lig	Turkish Cup	Turkish Super Cup	Champions League	Europa League	Total
1	10	FW	(Belgium)	Dries Mertens	16	0	0	0	0	16
2	9	FW	(Argentina)	Mauro Icardi	8	0	0	1	2	11
2	53	MF	(Turkey)	Barış Alper Yılmaz	6	0	1	3	1	11
4	7	MF	(Turkey)	Kerem Aktürkoğlu	6	0	0	2	0	8
5	8	MF	(Germany)	Kerem Demirbay	3	3	0	0	0	6
6	14	MF	(Ivory Coast)	Wilfried Zaha	3	0	0	1	0	4
6	20	MF	(Brazil)	Tetê	3	1	0	0	0	4
6	22	MF	(Morocco)	Hakim Ziyech	3	0	0	1	0	4
9	23	DF	(Turkey)	Kaan Ayhan	3	0	0	0	0	3
10	5	MF	(Germany)	Eyüp Aydın	1	1	0	0	0	2
10	6	DF	(Colombia)	Davinson Sánchez	0	0	0	2	0	2
10	17	DF	(Germany)	Derrick Köhn	2	0	0	0	0	2
10	27	MF	(Portugal)	Sérgio Oliveira	0	0	0	2	0	2
10	34	MF	(Uruguay)	Lucas Torreira	2	0	0	0	0	2
15	3	DF	(Spain)	Angeliño	1	0	0	0	0	1
15	11	MF	(Turkey)	Yunus Akgün	0	0	0	1	0	1
15	18	MF	(Turkey)	Berkan Kutlu	1	0	0	0	0	1
15	21	FW	(Turkey)	Halil Dervişoğlu	1	0	0	0	0	1
15	91	MF	(France)	Tanguy Ndombele	1	0	0	0	0	1
Totals					53	5	1	13	3	75

Source: FBref.com, Mackolik.com

=== Clean sheets ===
Includes all competitions for senior teams. The list is sorted by squad number when season-total clean sheets are equal. Numbers in parentheses represent games where both goalkeepers participated and both kept a clean sheet; the number in parentheses is awarded to the goalkeeper who was substituted on, whilst a full clean sheet is awarded to the goalkeeper who was on the field at the start of play. Goalkeepers with no clean sheets not included in the list.

Rank	No.	Pos	Nat	Name	Süper Lig	Turkish Cup	Turkish Super Cup	Champions League	Europa League	Total
1	1	GK	(Uruguay)	Fernando Muslera	17	0	1	3	0	21
2	19	GK	(Turkey)	Günay Güvenç	1	0	0	0	0	1
Totals					18	0	1	3	0	22

Source: FBref.com, Mackolik.com

=== Disciplinary record ===
Includes all competitions for senior teams. The list is sorted by red cards, then yellow cards (and by squad number when total cards are equal). Players with no cards not included in the list.

No.	Pos	Nat	Name	Süper Lig			Turkish Cup			Turkish Super Cup			Champions League			Europa League			Total		
No.	Pos	Nat	Name	Yellow card	(yellow card) (yellow-red card)	Red card	Yellow card	(yellow card) (yellow-red card)	Red card	Yellow card	(yellow card) (yellow-red card)	Red card	Yellow card	(yellow card) (yellow-red card)	Red card	Yellow card	(yellow card) (yellow-red card)	Red card	Yellow card	(yellow card) (yellow-red card)	Red card
1	GK	(Uruguay)	Fernando Muslera	4	0	0	0	0	0	0	0	0	0	0	0	0	0	0	4	0	0
3	DF	(Spain)	Angeliño	1	0	0	0	0	0	0	0	0	1	0	0	0	0	0	2	0	0
5	MF	(Germany)	Eyüp Aydın	0	0	0	1	0	0	0	0	0	0	0	0	0	0	0	1	0	0
6	DF	(Colombia)	Davinson Sánchez	4	0	0	0	0	0	0	0	0	0	0	0	0	0	0	4	0	0
7	MF	(Turkey)	Kerem Aktürkoğlu	3	1	0	0	0	0	0	0	0	0	0	0	1	0	0	4	1	0
8	MF	(Germany)	Kerem Demirbay	2	0	0	0	0	0	0	0	0	0	0	0	1	0	0	3	0	0
9	FW	(Argentina)	Mauro Icardi	2	0	0	0	0	0	0	0	0	0	0	0	0	0	0	2	0	0
10	FW	(Belgium)	Dries Mertens	3	0	0	0	0	0	0	0	0	1	0	0	0	0	0	4	0	0
14	MF	(Ivory Coast)	Wilfried Zaha	2	0	0	0	0	0	0	0	0	1	0	0	0	0	0	3	0	0
17	DF	(Germany)	Derrick Köhn	1	0	0	0	0	0	0	0	0	0	0	0	0	0	0	1	0	0
18	MF	(Turkey)	Berkan Kutlu	2	0	0	0	0	0	0	0	0	1	0	0	1	0	0	4	0	0
19	GK	(Turkey)	Günay Güvenç	1	0	0	0	0	0	0	0	0	0	0	0	0	0	0	1	0	0
20	MF	(Brazil)	Tetê	1	0	0	0	0	0	0	0	0	1	0	0	0	0	0	2	0	0
21	FW	(Turkey)	Halil Dervişoğlu	0	0	0	0	0	0	0	0	0	1	0	0	0	0	0	1	0	0
22	MF	(Morocco)	Hakim Ziyech	4	0	0	0	0	0	0	0	0	1	0	0	0	0	0	5	0	0
23	DF	(Turkey)	Kaan Ayhan	3	0	0	0	0	0	0	0	0	3	0	0	0	0	1	6	0	1
25	DF	(Denmark)	Victor Nelsson	3	0	0	1	0	0	0	0	0	0	0	0	0	0	1	4	0	1
27	MF	(Portugal)	Sérgio Oliveira	3	0	0	0	0	0	0	0	0	3	0	0	0	0	0	6	0	0
34	MF	(Uruguay)	Lucas Torreira	7	0	0	0	0	0	0	0	0	1	0	1	0	0	0	8	0	1
42	DF	(Turkey)	Abdülkerim Bardakcı	4	0	0	0	0	0	0	0	0	2	0	0	0	0	0	6	0	0
53	MF	(Turkey)	Barış Alper Yılmaz	8	0	0	1	0	0	0	0	0	1	0	0	1	0	0	11	0	0
93	DF	(France)	Sacha Boey	4	0	0	0	0	0	0	0	0	3	0	0	0	0	0	7	0	0
94	FW	(Democratic Republic of the Congo)	Cédric Bakambu	1	0	0	0	0	0	0	0	0	1	0	0	0	0	0	2	0	0
95	FW	(Brazil)	Carlos Vinícius	2	0	0	0	0	0	0	0	0	0	0	0	1	0	0	3	0	0
Totals				65	1	0	3	0	0	0	0	0	21	0	1	5	0	2	94	1	3

Source: FBref.com, Mackolik.com

=== Game as captain ===
Includes all competitions for senior teams. The list is sorted by squad number when season-total number of games where a player started as captain are equal. Players with no games started as captain not included in the list.

Rank	No.	Pos	Nat	Name	Süper Lig	Turkish Cup	Turkish Super Cup	Champions League	Europa League	Total
1	1	GK	(Uruguay)	Fernando Muslera	37	0	1	12	2	52
2	7	MF	(Turkey)	Kerem Aktürkoğlu	1	2	0	0	0	3
3	18	MF	(Turkey)	Berkan Kutlu	0	1	0	0	0	1
Totals					38	3	1	12	2	56

Source: FBref.com, Mackolik.com

== Injury record ==
N	P	Nat.	Name	Type	Status	Source	Match	Inj. Date	Ret. Date
34	MF	(Uruguay)	Lucas Torreira	Twisted knee		Galatasaray.org	vs Hull City	5 July 2023	3 August 2023
17	MF	(Italy)	Nicolò Zaniolo	groin strain		hurriyet.com.tr	in training	1 August 2023	22 August 2023
14	MF	(Ivory Coast)	Wilfried Zaha	unknown injury		fotomac.com.tr	vs Olimpija Ljubljana	15 August 2023	14 September 2023
27	MF	(Portugal)	Sérgio Oliveira	unknown injury		fotomac.com.tr	in training	29 August 2023	12 September 2023
88	DF	(Turkey)	Kazımcan Karataş	Twisted knee		Galatasaray.org	vs İstanbul Başakşehir	23 September 2023	4 October 2023
22	MF	(Morocco)	Hakim Ziyech	Foot injury		fanatik.com.tr	in training	25 September 2023	18 October 2023
9	FW	(Argentina)	Mauro Icardi	Peroneal tendon injury		Galatasaray.org	vs Beşiktaş	21 October 2023	24 October 2023
1	GK	(Uruguay)	Fernando Muslera	Muscle tear		Galatasaray.org	vs Kasımpaşa	3 November 2023	8 November 2023
6	DF	(Colombia)	Davinson Sánchez	Hamstring strain		Galatasaray.org	vs Alanyaspor	25 November 2023	10 December 2023
6	DF	(Colombia)	Davinson Sánchez	Toe injury		sporx.com	in training	12 December 2023	16 January 2024
27	MF	(Portugal)	Sérgio Oliveira	Chest injury		Galatasaray.org	in training	15 December 2023	12 February 2024
9	FW	(Argentina)	Mauro Icardi	Eyebow fracture		Galatasaray.org	vs Fenerbahçe	5 January 2024	19 January 2024
93	DF	(France)	Sacha Boey	Knee problems		ajansspor.com	in training	10 January 2024	14 January 2024
23	DF	(Turkey)	Kaan Ayhan	Groin problems		hurriyet.com.tr	in training	10 January 2024	14 January 2024
42	DF	(Turkey)	Abdülkerim Bardakcı	Hamstring strain		Galatasaray.org	vs Trabzonspor	21 January 2024	12 February 2024
22	MF	(Morocco)	Hakim Ziyech	Ankle injury		Galatasaray.org	vs Zambia	24 January 2024	3 March 2024
92	DF	(Ivory Coast)	Serge Aurier	strain		Galatasaray.org	vs Nigeria	11 February 2024	25 March 2024
23	DF	(Turkey)	Kaan Ayhan	unknown injury		hurriyet.com.tr	vs Sparta Prague	15 February 2024	22 February 2024
91	MF	(France)	Tanguy Ndombele	unknown injury		haberglobal.com.tr	in training	16 February 2024	27 February 2024
42	DF	(Turkey)	Abdülkerim Bardakcı	Hamstring strain		hurriyet.com.tr	in training	2 March 2024	14 March 2024
14	MF	(Ivory Coast)	Wilfried Zaha	Bone edema		hurriyet.com.tr	in training	2 March 2024	6 March 2024
6	DF	(Colombia)	Davinson Sánchez	unknown injury		aspor.com.tr	vs Beşiktaş	3 March 2024	18 March 2024
23	DF	(Turkey)	Kaan Ayhan	Hematoma		Galatasaray.org	vs Çaykur Rizespor	8 March 2024	13 March 2024

- Player is injured
- Player has recovered from injury
Source: Galatasaray Sports Club

== Attendances ==
As of 19 May 2024

Competition	Total	Games	Average
Süper Lig	821,774	19	43,251
Turkish Cup	25,805	1	25,805
Champions League	279,417	6	46,570
Europa League	46,802	1	46,802
Total	1,173,798	27	43,474
