= Gökdeniz =

Gökdeniz is Turkish masculine given name. Notable people with the name include:

- Gökdeniz Bayrakdar (born 2001), Turkish footballer
- Gökdeniz Gürpüz (born 2006), Turkish footballer
- Gökdeniz Karadeniz (born 1980), Turkish footballer

== See also ==
- Aselsan Gökdeniz – Turkish anti-aircraft gun
