= Barış Alper Yılmaz =

Turkish footballer

Barış Yılmaz
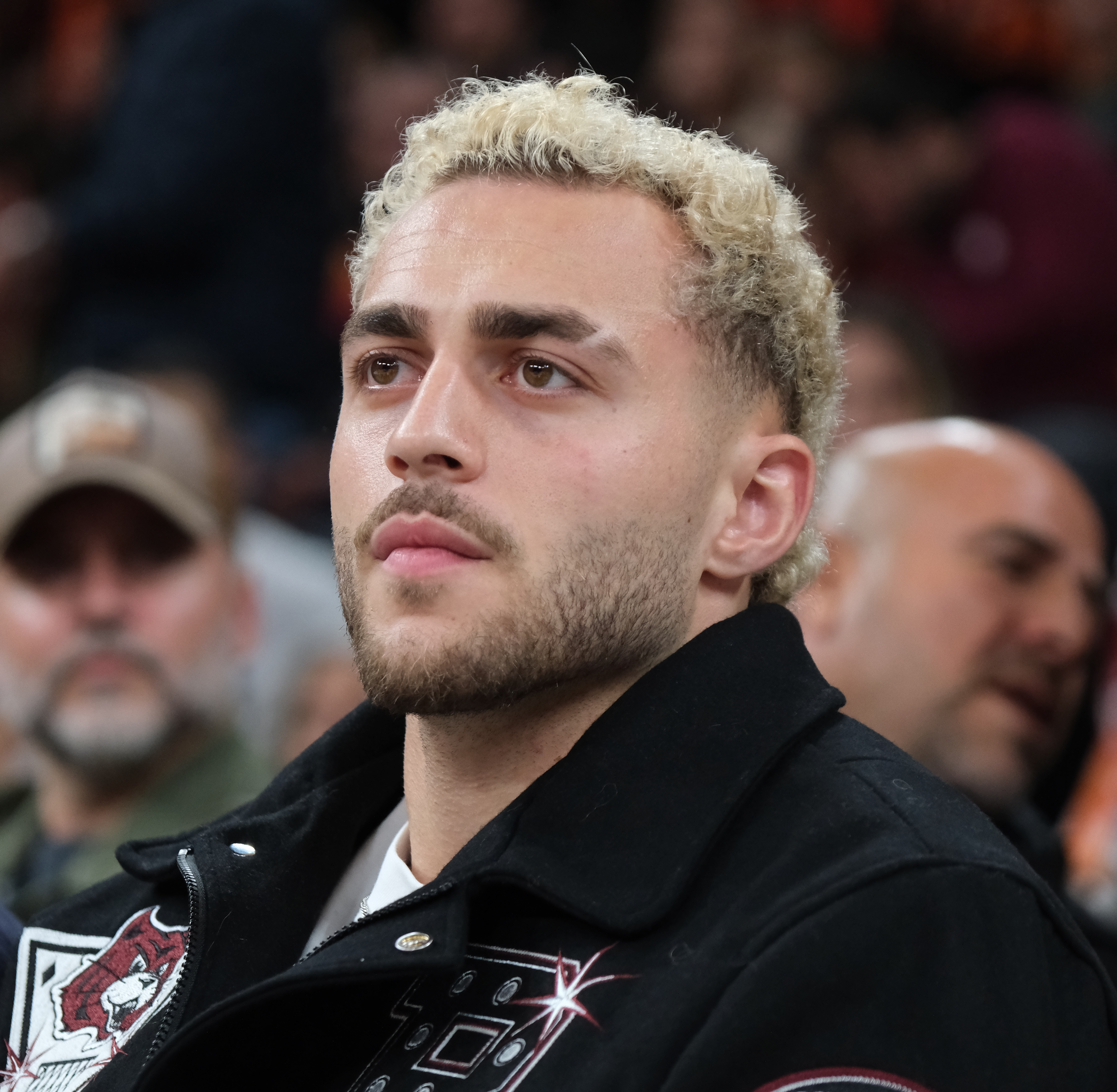
- Yılmaz in 2025

Personal information
- Full name: Barış Alper Yılmaz
- Date of birth: 23 May 2000 (age 26)
- Place of birth: Rize, Turkey
- Height: 1.86 m (6 ft 1 in)
- Position: Winger

Team information
- Current team: Galatasaray
- Number: 53

Youth career
- 2011–2017: Rize İl Özel İdarespor

Senior career*
Years	Team	Apps	(Gls)
2017–2020	Ankara Demirspor	39	(1)
2020–2021	Ankara Keçiörengücü	34	(8)
2021–	Galatasaray	151	(32)

International career^{‡}
2021–2022	Turkey U21	9	(2)
2021–	Turkey	43	(6)
- * Club domestic league appearances and goals as of 23:31, 7 November 2026 (UTC) ‡ National team caps and goals as of 15 November 2026

Barış Alper Yılmaz (born 23 May 2000) is a Turkish professional footballer who plays as a winger for Süper Lig club Galatasaray and the Turkey national team.

== Club career ==
=== Early career ===
Yılmaz started football in 2011 in Rize İl Özel İdarespor. In 2017, he was transferred to Ankara Demirspor, one of the third league teams. After playing here for three seasons, he was transferred to Ankara Keçiörengücü, which was promoted to the first league.

=== Galatasaray ===
Yılmaz transferred to Galatasaray on 9 July 2021. His contract was extended by Galatasaray on 4 May 2023 to be valid until the end of the 2026–27 season.

Yılmaz became the champion in the Süper Lig in the 2022–23 season with the Galatasaray team. Defeating Ankaragücü 4–1 away in the match played in the 36th week on 30 May 2023, Galatasaray secured the lead with two weeks before the end and won the 23rd championship in its history.

Yılmaz scored his first UEFA Champions League goal for Galatasaray on 25 February 2026 against Juventus, in a game Galatasaray lost 3-2 but advanced 7-5 on aggregate. On 26 April 2026 he scored his first goal against Fenerbahçe in a 3-0 win from a penalty kick.

== International career ==
Yılmaz played three matches with the Turkey under-21 national football team and scored 1 goal. He debuted with the senior Turkey national team in a 6–0 win over Gibraltar on 13 November 2021.

On 12 October 2023, Yılmaz scored his first goal for Turkey in a 1–0 UEFA Euro 2024 qualifying win over Croatia.

He was named in Turkey's 26-man squad for UEFA Euro 2024.

On 2 June 2026, Yılmaz was selected in the 26-man squad for Turkey's 2026 FIFA World Cup.

== Career statistics ==
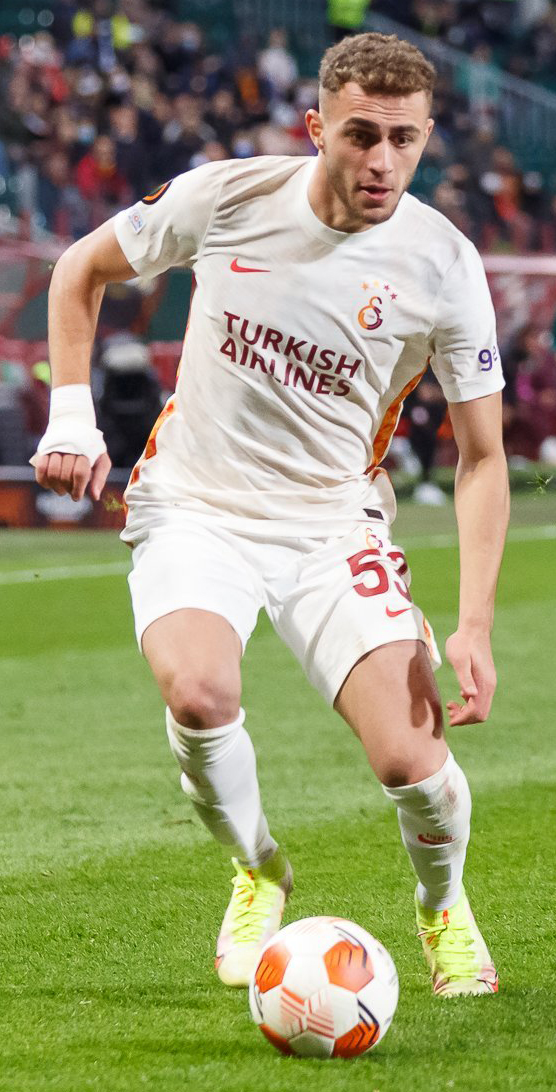
Yılmaz with Galatasaray in 2021

=== Club ===
As of match played 7 November 2026

Appearances and goals by club, season and competition
Club	Season	League			Turkish Cup		Europe		Other		Total	
Club	Season	Division	Apps	Goals	Apps	Goals	Apps	Goals	Apps	Goals	Apps	Goals
Ankara Demirspor	2017–18	TFF Third League	4	0	2	0	—		—		6	0
Ankara Demirspor	2018–19	TFF Third League	16	1	1	0	—		—		17	1
Ankara Demirspor	2019–20	TFF Third League	19	0	1	0	—		—		20	0
Ankara Demirspor	Total		39	1	4	0	—		—		43	1
Ankara Keçiörengücü	2020–21	TFF First League	34	8	2	0	—		—		36	8
Galatasaray	2021–22	Süper Lig	17	0	1	0	5 (Note: One appearance in UEFA Champions League, four appearances in UEFA Europa League)	0	—		23	0
Galatasaray	2022–23	Süper Lig	25	4	5	0	—		—		30	4
Galatasaray	2023–24	Süper Lig	37	6	3	1	14 (Note: Twelve appearances in UEFA Champions League, two appearances in UEFA Europa League)	0	1 (Note: Appearance(s) in Turkish Super Cup)	0	55	7
Galatasaray	2024–25	Süper Lig	32	12	4	1	11 (Note: Two appearances in UEFA Champions League, nine appearances and one goal in UEFA Europa League)	1	1	0	48	14
Galatasaray	2025–26	Süper Lig	30	8	5	2	12 (Note: Appearances in UEFA Champions League)	1	2	1	49	12
Galatasaray	2026–27	Süper Lig	10	2	0	0	4	0	0	0	14	2
Galatasaray	Total		151	32	18	4	46	2	4	1	219	39
Career total			224	41	24	4	46	2	4	1	298	48

=== International ===
As of match played 2 October 2026

Appearances and goals by national team and year
National team	Year	Apps	Goals
Turkey	2021	2	0
Turkey	2023	9	1
Turkey	2024	13	1
Turkey	2025	7	0
Turkey	2026	12	4
Total		43	6

Scores and results list Turkey's goal tally first, score column indicates score after each Yılmaz goal.

List of international goals scored by Barış Alper Yılmaz
No.	Date	Venue	Cap	Opponent	Score	Result	Competition
1	12 October 2023	Opus Arena, Osijek, Croatia	8	Croatia	1–0	1–0	UEFA Euro 2024 qualifying
2	10 June 2024	Stadion Narodowy, Warsaw, Poland	15	Poland	1–1	1–2	Friendly
3	1 June 2026	Şükrü Saracoğlu Stadium, Istanbul, Turkey	34	North Macedonia	4–0	4–0	Friendly
4	6 June 2026	Inter Miami CF Stadium, Fort Lauderdale, United States	35	Venezuela	1–1	2–1	Friendly
5	25 June 2026	SoFi Stadium, Inglewood, United States	38	United States	2–1	3–2	2026 FIFA World Cup
6	28 September 2026	Centennial Atatürk Stadium, Bursa, Turkey	40	Italy	1–3	1–4	2026–27 UEFA Nations League A

== Honours ==
Galatasaray

- Süper Lig: 2022–23, 2023–24, 2024–25, 2025–26
- Turkish Cup: 2024–25
- Turkish Super Cup: 2023

Individual

- Süper Lig Team of the Season: 2023–24, 2024–25, 2025–26
