= İrfan Saraloğlu =

Turkish football coach (born 1962)

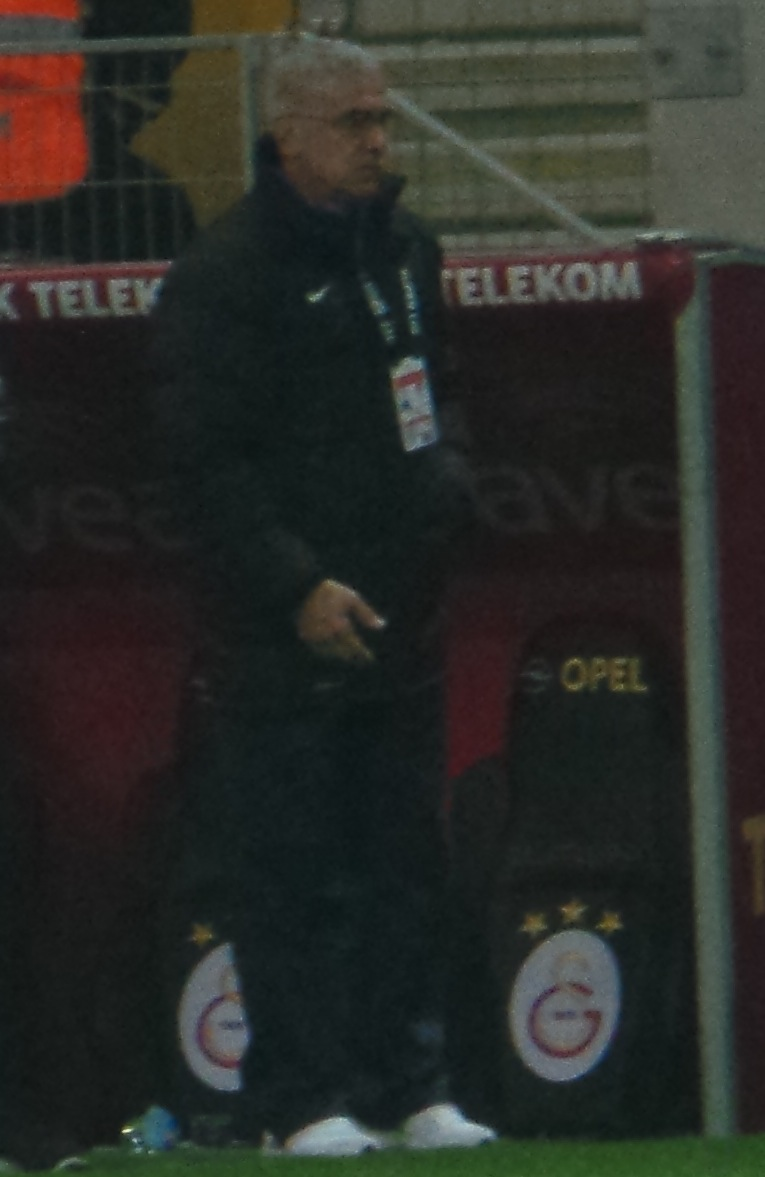

Personal information
- Date of birth: 16 September 1962 (age 64)
- Place of birth: Ardeşen, Rize, Turkey
- Position: Defender

Team information
- Current team: Galatasaray (assistant coach)

Senior career*
Years	Team	Apps	(Gls)
- Çaykur Rizespor
- Keşanspor
- Erdemirspor
- Maltepespor
- Sivasspor
- Edremit Belediyespor
- Siirtspor

Managerial career
- 2013–2014: Elazığspor (assistant)
- 2014–2015: Gaziantepspor (assistant)
- 2015–2016: Sivasspor (assistant)
- 2016–2017: Göztepe (assistant)
- 2017–2018: Akhisar Belediyespor (assistant)
- 2018–2019: Çaykur Rizespor (assistant)
- 2019–2021: İstanbul Başakşehir (assistant)
- 2022–: Galatasaray (assistant)
- * Club domestic league appearances and goals

İrfan Saraloğlu (born 16 September 1962) is a Turkish football coach and former professional football player. He is currently an assistant manager at Galatasaray. He played professionally for 14 years.

== Club career ==
Saraloğlu played for Çaykur Rizespor, Sivasspor, Maltepespor, Erdemir Ereğlispor, Düzcespor, Siirtspor and Keşanspor.

== Coaching career ==
He qualified his A category coaching licence in 1995. He has worked for Fenerbahçe S.K. and Fenerbahçe Youth Academy from 2004 until 2012. He also worked at West Ham United in 2000.

Since 2022 he is assisting coach for Okan Buruk, who currently manages Galatasaray.

== Personal life ==
Saraloğlu was born in Ardeşen, Rize. His son Utku Saraloğlu is a professional basketball player.

== Honours ==
=== Coach ===
Akhisarspor

- Turkish Cup: 2017–18

İstanbul Başakşehir

- Süper Lig: 2019–20

Galatasaray

- Süper Lig: 2022–23, 2023–24, 2024–25, 2025–26
- Turkish Cup: 2024–25
- Turkish Super Cup: 2023
