= Eyüp Aydın =

Turkish footballer

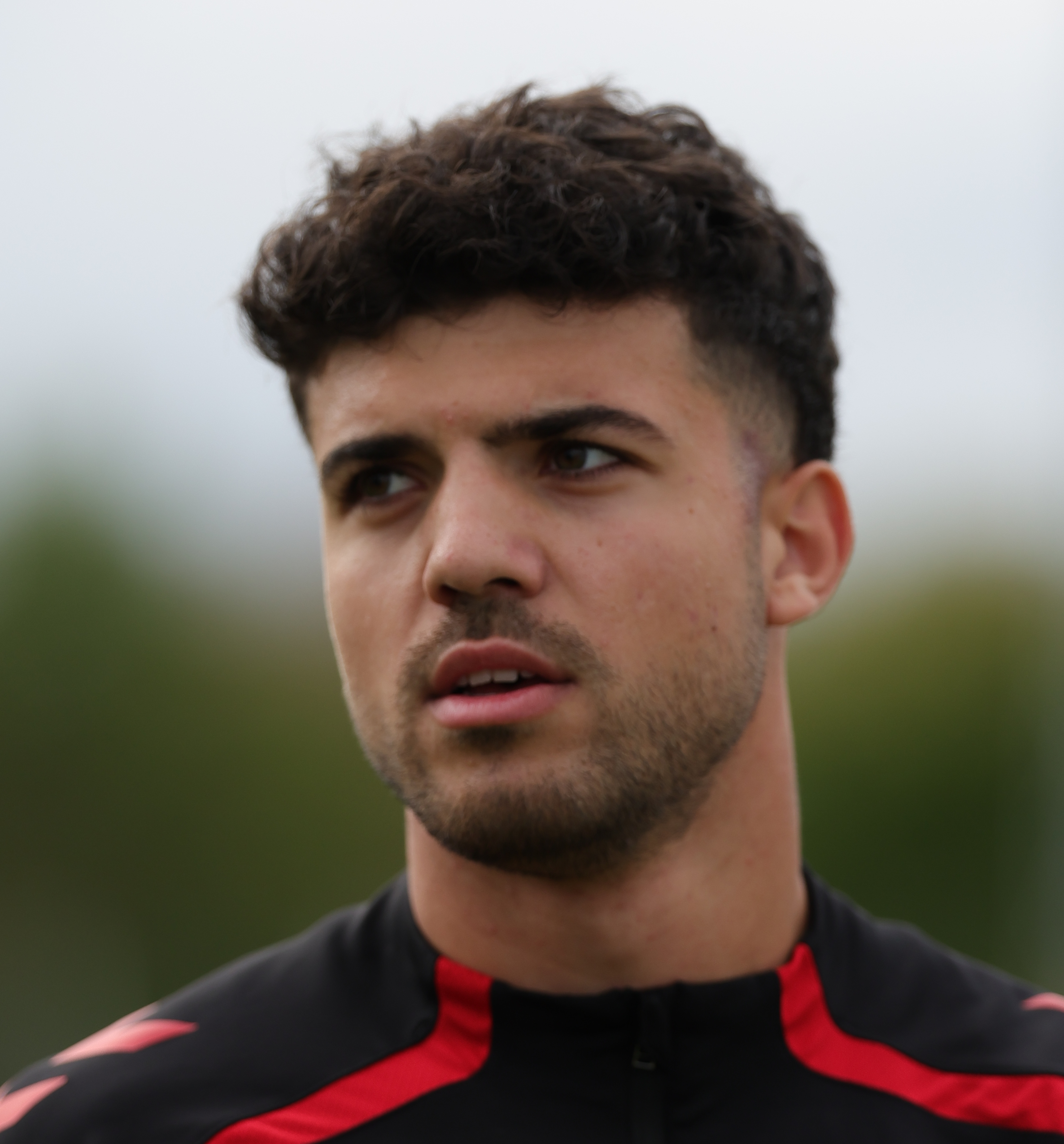

Personal information
- Full name: Murat Eyüp Aydın
- Date of birth: 2 August 2004 (age 22)
- Place of birth: Heidenheim an der Brenz, Germany
- Height: 1.81 m (5 ft 11 in)
- Position: Defensive midfielder

Team information
- Current team: Galatasaray

Youth career
- 2010–2012: SV Mergelstetten
- 2012–2017: 1. FC Heidenheim
- 2017–2021: Bayern Munich

Senior career*
| Years | Team | Apps | (Gls) |
| 2021–2023 | Bayern Munich II | 55 | (4) |
| 2023– | Galatasaray | 12 | (0) |
| 2025–2026 | → Samsunspor (loan) | 6 | (0) |
| 2026 | → Kasımpaşa (loan) | 3 | (0) |

International career^{‡}
| 2019 | Germany U15 | 1 | (1) |
| 2019–2020 | Germany U16 | 7 | (0) |
| 2025– | Turkey U21 | 8 | (0) |
- * Club domestic league appearances and goals as of 1 June 2026 ‡ National team caps and goals as of 23:45, 14 November 2025 (UTC)

Murat Eyüp Aydın (born 2 August 2004) is a professional footballer who plays as a defensive midfielder for Süper Lig club Kasımpaşa, on loan from Galatasaray. Born in Germany, he represents Turkey internationally at the youth level.

== Club career ==
=== Bayern Munich ===
Aydın began playing football with his local club SV Mergelstetten at the age of 6, he then moved to 1. FC Heidenheim at the age of 8, and finally joined the youth academy of Bayern Munich in 2017. He was promoted to Bayern Munich II at the age of 16 in 2021. On 22 July 2021, Aydın signed his first professional contract with Bayern Munich II, keeping him at the club until the summer of 2023. He made 55 appearances for Bayern's reserves in the Regionalliga, scoring 4 goals.

=== Galatasaray ===
On 15 September 2023, Aydın signed with the Turkish Süper Lig club Galatasaray on a 3-year contract.

==== Loan to Samsunspor ====
On September 12, 2025, he joined fellow Süper Lig club Samsunspor, on a one-year loan until the end of the 2025–26 season. On February 2, 2026, Samsunspor announced that his loan spell was mutually terminated.

==== Loan to Kasımpaşa ====
On February 3, 2026, Aydın joined fellow Süper Lig club Kasımpaşa on a six-month loan until the end of the season.

== International career ==
Born in Germany, Aydın is of Turkish descent. He represented his birth nation, having played up with the Germany U15s and then the U16s.

In November 2021, Aydın opted to play for Turkey internationally and was called up to a training camp for the Turkey U21s. In March 2026 while he was in the Turkey U21s camp, Aydın received an emergency call-up to the Turkey senior squad for the training squad against Romania.

== Career statistics ==
=== Club ===
As of 6 February 2026

Appearances and goals by club, season and competition
| Club | Season | League | | | National cup (Note: Includes Turkish Cup) | | Total | |
| Club | Season | Division | Apps | Goals | Apps | Goals | Apps | Goals |
|---|---|---|---|---|---|---|---|---|
| Bayern Munich II | 2021–22 | Regionalliga Bayern | 30 | 1 | – | | 30 | 1 |
| Bayern Munich II | 2022–23 | Regionalliga Bayern | 24 | 3 | – | | 30 | 3 |
| Bayern Munich II | Total | | 54 | 4 | – | | 54 | 4 |
| Galatasaray | 2023–24 | Süper Lig | 10 | 0 | 2 | 0 | 12 | 0 |
| Galatasaray | 2024–25 | Süper Lig | 2 | 0 | 2 | 1 | 4 | 1 |
| Galatasaray | Total | | 12 | 0 | 4 | 1 | 16 | 1 |
| Samsunspor (loan) | 2025–26 | Süper Lig | 6 | 0 | 0 | 0 | 6 | 0 |
| Kasımpaşa (loan) | 2025–26 | Süper Lig | 0 | 0 | 0 | 0 | 0 | 0 |
| Career total | | | 72 | 4 | 4 | 1 | 76 | 5 |

== Honours ==
Galatasaray

- Süper Lig: 2024–25
- Turkish Cup: 2024–25
- Turkish Super Cup: 2023
