= Victor Nelsson =

Danish footballer (born 1998)

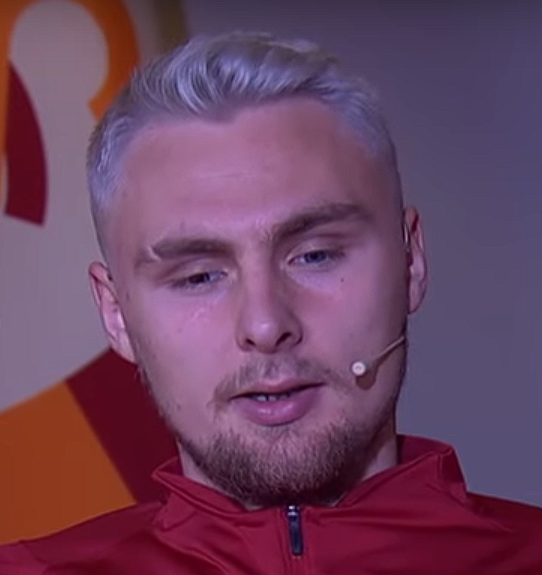
- Nelsson with Galatasaray in 2021

Personal information
- Full name: Victor Enok Nelsson
- Date of birth: 14 October 1998 (age 28)
- Place of birth: Hornbæk, Denmark
- Height: 1.85 m (6 ft 1 in)
- Position: Centre-back

Team information
- Current team: Nordsjælland
- Number: 5

Youth career
- 2002-2010: Hornbæk IF
- 2010–2016: Nordsjælland

Senior career*
| Years | Team | Apps | (Gls) |
| 2016–2019 | Nordsjælland | 90 | (1) |
| 2019–2021 | Copenhagen | 63 | (1) |
| 2021–2026 | Galatasaray | 112 | (3) |
| 2025 | → Roma (loan) | 4 | (0) |
| 2025–2026 | → Hellas Verona (loan) | 38 | (0) |
| 2026– | Nordsjælland | 5 | (0) |

International career^{‡}
| 2016 | Denmark U18 | 1 | (0) |
| 2016–2017 | Denmark U19 | 8 | (0) |
| 2017–2021 | Denmark U21 | 34 | (3) |
| 2020– | Denmark | 19 | (0) |
- * Club domestic league appearances and goals as of 18 October 2026 ‡ National team caps and goals as of 23:00, 14 November 2026 (UTC)

Victor Enok Nelsson (born 14 October 1998) is a Danish professional footballer who plays as a centre-back for Nordsjælland, and the Denmark national team.

== Early career ==
Nelsson started playing football when he was 4 years old with local youth club Hornbæk IF, where his father also was coaching. Later, he got contacted by scouts from fellow club FC Nordsjælland, and joined the club on 25 March 2010.

== Club career ==
=== FC Nordsjælland ===
Nelsson made his debut for FC Nordsjælland on 12 September 2016. Having started on the bench, he replaced compatriot Mathias Jensen in the 87nd minute in a 3–1 defeat against AGF in the Danish Superliga. On 14 October 2016, Nelsson signed his first professional contract with the club and was promoted to the first team squad. He played 23 league games for FCN in the 2016–17 season. Nelsson played the first two league games at the midfield, but was subsequently retrained to centre-back. He became a regular starter from the 2017–18 season.

At the age of 19 and after a great period in the first half part of the 2017–18 season, Nelsson got called up to the Denmark B national team by Åge Hareide, so he could look him forward and consider to pick him to the A national team. In the winter break 2017–18, he changed his shirt number from 36 to 4.

=== FC Copenhagen ===
On 5 July 2019, Nelsson signed for fellow Danish side FC Copenhagen, signing a five-year contract until 2024.

=== Galatasaray ===
On 11 August 2021, Turkish club Galatasaray announced that they had reached an agreement with Copenhagen that acquired Nelsson to join the club, for a reported transfer fee of €7 million to be paid within five years. In addition, according to the agreement, the unilateral release fee for him was determined as €25 million.

Nelsson became the champion in the Süper Lig in the 2022–23 season with the Galatasaray team. Defeating Ankaragücü 4–1 away in the match played in the 36th week on 30 May 2023, Galatasaray secured the lead with two weeks before the end and won the 23rd championship in its history.

==== Loan to Roma ====
On February 3, 2025, on transfer deadline day, it was confirmed that Nelsson joined Serie A club Roma on a season-long loan from Galatasaray, with an option to buy if obligations were met.

==== Loan to Hellas Verona ====
On 21 August 2025, Galatasaray announced that Nelsson had joined fellow Italian side Hellas Verona on loan for the rest of the 2025–26 season, with an option to buy at the end of the latter season.

==== Return to Galatasaray after loan ====
On September 2, 2026, the contract between Galatasaray and Nelsson was mutually terminated.

==== Return to FC Nordsjælland ====
Later the same day, after he had terminated his contract in Turkey, he signed with his former club FC Nordsjælland on a four-year contract.

== Career statistics ==
=== Club ===
As of match played 18 October 2026

Appearances and goals by club, season and competition
| Club | Season | League | | | National cup (Note: Includes Danish Cup, Turkish Cup, Coppa Italia) | | Europe | | Other | | Total | |
| Club | Season | Division | Apps | Goals | Apps | Goals | Apps | Goals | Apps | Goals | Apps | Goals |
|---|---|---|---|---|---|---|---|---|---|---|---|---|
| Nordsjælland | 2016–17 | Danish Superliga | 23 | 0 | 1 | 0 | — | | — | | 24 | 0 |
| Nordsjælland | 2017–18 | Danish Superliga | 33 | 1 | 1 | 0 | — | | — | | 34 | 1 |
| Nordsjælland | 2018–19 | Danish Superliga | 34 | 0 | 1 | 0 | 5 (Note: Appearances in UEFA Europa League) | 0 | — | | 40 | 0 |
| Nordsjælland | Total | | 90 | 1 | 3 | 0 | 5 | 0 | — | | 98 | 1 |
| Copenhagen | 2019–20 | Danish Superliga | 34 | 0 | 2 | 0 | 16 (Note: Four appearances in UEFA Champions League, twelve appearances in UEFA Europa League) | 0 | — | | 52 | 0 |
| Copenhagen | 2020–21 | Danish Superliga | 27 | 1 | 0 | 0 | 3 | 0 | — | | 30 | 1 |
| Copenhagen | 2021–22 | Danish Superliga | 2 | 0 | 0 | 0 | 2 (Note: Appearances in UEFA Conference League) | 0 | — | | 4 | 0 |
| Copenhagen | Total | | 63 | 1 | 2 | 0 | 21 | 0 | — | | 86 | 1 |
| Galatasaray | 2021–22 | Süper Lig | 36 | 1 | 1 | 0 | 8 | 0 | — | | 45 | 1 |
| Galatasaray | 2022–23 | Süper Lig | 33 | 0 | 2 | 1 | — | | — | | 35 | 1 |
| Galatasaray | 2023–24 | Süper Lig | 32 | 2 | 3 | 0 | 10 (Note: Nine appearances in UEFA Champions League, one appearance in UEFA Europa League) | 0 | 1 (Note: Appearance in Turkish Super Cup) | 0 | 46 | 2 |
| Galatasaray | 2024–25 | Süper Lig | 11 | 0 | 0 | 0 | 6 (Note: Two appearances in UEFA Champions League, four appearances in UEFA Europa League) | 0 | 1 | 0 | 18 | 0 |
| Galatasaray | Total | | 112 | 3 | 6 | 1 | 24 | 0 | 2 | 0 | 144 | 4 |
| Roma (loan) | 2024–25 | Serie A | 4 | 0 | 1 | 0 | 0 | 0 | — | | 5 | 0 |
| Hellas Verona (loan) | 2025–26 | Serie A | 38 | 0 | 0 | 0 | — | | — | | 38 | 0 |
| Nordsjælland | 2026–27 | Danish Superliga | 5 | 0 | 0 | 0 | 1 | 0 | — | | 6 | 0 |
| Career total | | | 312 | 5 | 12 | 1 | 51 | 0 | 2 | 0 | 377 | 6 |

== Honours ==
Galatasaray

- Süper Lig: 2022–23, 2023–24
- Turkish Super Cup: 2023
