= Baran Aksaka =

Turkish Footballer (born 2003)

Personal information
- Full name: Özgür Baran Aksaka
- Date of birth: 29 January 2003 (age 23)
- Place of birth: Tekirdağ, Turkey
- Height: 1.78 m (5 ft 10 in)
- Position: Midfielder

Team information
- Current team: İskenderunspor
- Number: 28

Youth career
- 2013–2023: Galatasaray

Senior career*
Years	Team	Apps	(Gls)
2022–2025	Galatasaray	1	(0)
2023	→ Şanlıurfaspor (loan)	2	(0)
2024	→ Gençlerbirliği (loan)	3	(0)
2024	→ Arda Kardzhali (loan)	15	(0)
2025	→ 68 Aksarayspor (loan)	7	(0)
2025–	İskenderunspor	22	(1)
- * Club domestic league appearances and goals as of 10:44, 11 March 2026 (UTC)

Özgür Baran Aksaka (Bulgarian: Йозгюр Баран Аксака; born 29 January 2003) is a Turkish-Bulgarian professional footballer who plays as a midfielder for İskenderunspor.

== Youth career ==
Aksaka was born Tekirdağ, Turkey, to a Turkish father and a mother of mixed Bulgarian and Turkish descent. Starting playing aged eight, he joined Galatasaray academy in 2013.

== Club career ==
=== Galatasaray ===
He made his debut for the first team on 19 October 2022 in a Turkish Cup match against Kastamonuspor. On 17 January 2023, Galatasaray extended his contract until the summer of 2026. He completed his professional debut on 4 January 2023 in a league match against Ankaragücü.

Aksaka became the champion in the Süper Lig in the 2022–23 season with the Galatasaray team. Defeating Ankaragücü 4-1 away in the match played in the 36th week on 30 May 2023, Galatasaray secured the lead with 2 weeks before the end and won the 23rd championship in its history.

==== Loans ====
On September 14, 2023, Aksaka has been loaned out to Şanlıurfaspor without an option to buy. In February 2024 he was sent on loan to Gençlerbirliği until end of the season.

On 17 July 2024 he signed a one year loan with the Bulgarian First League team Arda Kardzhali.

=== İskenderunspor (1978) ===
He signed a 2–year contract with İskenderunspor on August 11, 2025.

== International career ==
Aksaka holds dual citizenship making him available for both Turkey and Bulgaria. In December 2022 it was reported that he had received a call-up for Bulgaria U21 which he accepted. A few days later Tolunay Kafkas expressed the desire to call Aksaka in the Turkey U21. In an interview on 2 February 2023, Aleksandar Dimitrov, manager of Bulgaria U21, confirmed he had personally spoken with Aksaka about representing the team in the qualifications for European Under-21 Championship starting from March 2023. On 14 September 2023 he once again confirmed that Aksaka had decided to represent Bulgaria on international level and was not called up for U21 matches in September only because of lack of playing time on club level.

== Career statistics ==
=== Club ===
As of match played 4 January 2023

Appearances and goals by club, season and competition
Club	Season	League			Turkish Cup		Europe		Other		Total	
Club	Season	Division	Apps	Goals	Apps	Goals	Apps	Goals	Apps	Goals	Apps	Goals
Galatasaray	Süper Lig	2022–23	1	0	2	0	0	0	0	0	3	0
Galatasaray	Süper Lig	2023–24	0	0	0	0	0	0	0	0	0	0
Galatasaray	Total		1	0	2	0	0	0	0	0	3	0
Şanlıurfaspor (loan)	1. Lig	2023–24	0	0	0	0	–		–		0	0
Career total			1	0	2	0	0	0	0	0	3	0

== Honours ==
Galatasaray

- Süper Lig: 2022–23
