= Abdülkerim Bardakcı =

Turkish footballer

Personal information
- Full name: Abdülkerim Bardakcı
- Date of birth: 7 September 1994 (age 32)
- Place of birth: Meram, Turkey
- Height: 1.85 m (6 ft 1 in)
- Position: Centre-back

Team information
- Current team: Galatasaray
- Number: 42

Youth career
- 2007–2009: Fenerspor
- 2009–2011: Konyaspor

Senior career*
Years	Team	Apps	(Gls)
2011–2022	Konyaspor	104	(8)
2014	→ Anadolu Selçukluspor (loan)	6	(1)
2014–2015	→ Adana Demirspor (loan)	33	(3)
2017–2018	→ Samsunspor (loan)	32	(1)
2018	→ Giresunspor (loan)	13	(0)
2018–2019	→ Denizlispor (loan)	32	(2)
2019–2020	→ Altay (loan)	31	(3)
2022–	Galatasaray	119	(10)

International career^{‡}
2012	Turkey U18	6	(0)
2011–2013	Turkey U19	15	(0)
2012–2013	Turkey U20	6	(2)
2013–2015	Turkey U21	2	(0)
2023–	Turkey	35	(3)
- * Club domestic league appearances and goals as of 10 June 2026 ‡ National team caps and goals as of 15 November 2026

Abdülkerim Bardakcı (born 7 September 1994) is a Turkish professional footballer who plays as a centre-back for Süper Lig club Galatasaray, whom he captains, and the Turkey national team.

== Club career ==
Bardakcı made his Süper Lig debut on 17 August 2013 against Fenerbahçe.

On 25 June 2022, an agreement was reached with Bardakcı and his club Konyaspor on the transfer of the player. Accordingly, a net transfer fee of €2.8 million would be paid to the former club of the player.

Bardakcı became the champion in the Süper Lig in the 2022–23 season with the Galatasaray team. Defeating Ankaragücü 4–1 away in the match played in the 36th week on 30 May 2023, which secured Galatasaray their 23rd league championship in club history.

== International career ==
He was named in Turkey's 26-man squad for UEFA Euro 2024.

On 2 June 2026, Bardakcı was selected in the 26-man squad for the 2026 FIFA World Cup.

== Career statistics ==
=== Club ===
As of match played 9 May 2026

Appearances and goals by club, season and competition
Club	Season	League			Turkish Cup		Europe		Other		Total	
Club	Season	Division	Apps	Goals	Apps	Goals	Apps	Goals	Apps	Goals	Apps	Goals
Konyaspor	2011–12	TFF First League	18	0	1	0	–		–		19	0
Konyaspor	2012–13	TFF First League	2	0	0	0	–		–		2	0
Konyaspor	2013–14	Süper Lig	1	0	1	0	–		–		2	0
Konyaspor	2015–16	Süper Lig	7	1	6	0	–		–		13	1
Konyaspor	2016–17	Süper Lig	6	0	2	0	2 (Note: Appearances in UEFA Europa League)	0	–		10	0
Konyaspor	2020–21	Süper Lig	37	2	1	0	–		–		38	2
Konyaspor	2021–22	Süper Lig	33	5	2	1	–		–		35	6
Konyaspor	Total		104	8	13	1	2	0	–		119	9
Anadolu Selçukluspor (loan)	2013–14	TFF Second League	6	1	–		–		–		6	1
Adana Demirspor (loan)	2014–15	TFF First League	33	3	7	1	–		–		40	4
Giresunspor (loan)	2017–18	TFF First League	13	0	3	0	–		–		16	0
Denizlispor (loan)	2018–19	TFF First League	32	2	0	0	–		–		32	2
Altay (loan)	2019–20	TFF First League	31	3	0	0	–		–		31	3
Galatasaray	2022–23	Süper Lig	30	3	3	0	–		–		33	3
Galatasaray	2023–24	Süper Lig	27	4	2	1	14 (Note: Twelve appearances and one goal in UEFA Champions League, two appearances and one goal in UEFA Europa League)	2	1 (Note: Appearance(s) in Turkish Super Cup)	0	44	7
Galatasaray	2024–25	Süper Lig	32	3	5	1	11 (Note: One appearance in UEFA Champions League, ten appearances and one goal in UEFA Europa League)	1	1	0	49	5
Galatasaray	2025–26	Süper Lig	30	0	2	1	11 (Note: Appearances in UEFA Champions League)	0	2	0	45	1
Galatasaray	Total		119	10	12	3	36	3	4	0	171	16
Career total			338	27	35	5	38	3	4	0	415	35

=== International ===
As of match played 15 November 2026

Appearances and goals by national team and year
National team	Year	Apps	Goals
Turkey	2023	6	1
Turkey	2024	11	0
Turkey	2025	7	1
Turkey	2026	11	1
Total		35	3

Scores and results list Turkey's goal tally first.

List of international goals scored by Abdülkerim Bardakcı
No.	Date	Venue	Opponent	Score	Result	Competition
1.	16 June 2023	Skonto Stadium, Riga, Latvia	Latvia	1–0	3–2	UEFA Euro 2024 qualifying
2.	23 March 2025	Puskás Aréna, Budapest, Hungary	Hungary	3–0	3–0	2024–25 UEFA Nations League promotion/relegation play-offs
3.	15 November 2026	Stade Atlantique, Bordeaux, France	France	1–2	1–2	2026–27 UEFA Nations League A

== Honours ==
Galatasaray

- Süper Lig: 2022–23, 2023–24, 2024–25, 2025–26
- Turkish Cup: 2024–25
- Turkish Super Cup: 2023

Individual

- Süper Lig Team of the Season: 2022–23, 2024–25
