= Tetê =

Brazilian footballer (born 2000)

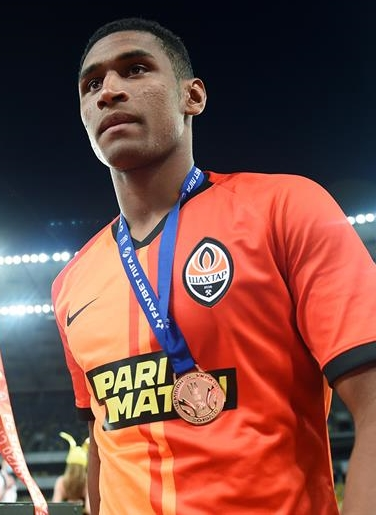
- Tetê with Shakhtar Donetsk in 2021

Personal information
- Full name: Mateus Cardoso Lemos Martins
- Date of birth: 15 February 2000 (age 26)
- Place of birth: Alvorada, Brazil
- Height: 1.75 m (5 ft 9 in)
- Position: Right winger

Team information
- Current team: Grêmio
- Number: 11

Youth career
- 2008–2019: Grêmio

Senior career*
Years	Team	Apps	(Gls)
2019–2023	Shakhtar Donetsk	75	(25)
2022–2023	→ Lyon (loan)	26	(8)
2023	→ Leicester City (loan)	13	(1)
2023–2024	Galatasaray	33	(0)
2024–2026	Panathinaikos	44	(7)
2026–	Grêmio	12	(2)

International career^{‡}
2015	Brazil U15	3	(0)
2016	Brazil U17	1	(0)
2019	Brazil U20	7	(0)
2020	Brazil U23	2	(0)
- * Club domestic league appearances and goals as of 7 April 2026 ‡ National team caps and goals as of 23 November 2025

Mateus Cardoso Lemos Martins (born 15 February 2000), commonly known as Tetê, or Furacão Tetê, is a Brazilian professional footballer who plays as a right winger for Campeonato Brasileiro Série A club Grêmio.

== Club career ==
=== Early career ===
Born in Alvorada, Rio Grande do Sul, Tetê joined the youth academy of Grêmio in 2008. In 2016, he scored 33 goals for the reserves. On 20 April 2018, his contract was extended until 2021.

=== Shakhtar Donetsk ===
On 20 February 2019, Tetê moved abroad and joined Ukrainian club Shakhtar Donetsk. On 13 April, he made his first team debut in a 3–0 league victory against Zorya Luhansk. On 6 November, he scored his first Champions League goal in a 3–3 away draw against Dinamo Zagreb in the 2019–20 season.

On 21 October 2020, Tetê scored the opening goal and provided one assist in Shakhtar's memorable 3–2 victory away to Real Madrid in the group stage of the UEFA Champions League.

==== Loans ====
On 7 March 2022, FIFA announced that, due to the Russian invasion of Ukraine, all the contracts of foreign players in Ukraine are suspended until 30 June 2022 and they are allowed to sign with clubs outside Ukraine until that day. On 31 March 2022, Tetê used the new rule to join Lyon in France until the end of June 2022. The arrangement was repeated for the 2022–23 season as FIFA has extended the system for another year.

On 29 January 2023, Tetê signed for Premier League side Leicester City on loan until June 2023. On 4 February 2023, he scored on his debut for Leicester City in a 4–2 win against Aston Villa in the Premier League.

In July 2023, Tetê announced he would not be returning to Shakhtar Donetsk, citing the ongoing war in Ukraine as a contributing factor. He said he had received indications of interest from a number of clubs, including Celtic.

=== Galatasaray ===
On 10 August 2023, Tetê signed for Galatasaray on a four-year contract with an option for an extra year. Thirteen days later, he made his debut for the first team, coming on in the 82nd minute to replace Yunus Akgün in a 3–2 away win against Molde in the Champions League play-off round game. He scored his first goal for the club in a 2–2 draw against Copenhagen in the group stage of the competition on 20 September.

=== Panathinaikos ===
On 25 July 2024, Tetê signed a four-year deal with the Greek side Panathinaikos.

=== Grêmio ===
On 11 January 2026, Tetê moved to his native Brazil signing with Grêmio in a deal worth €6,500,000.

== International career ==
Tetê has represented the under-20 team at the 2019 South American U-20 Championship. In March 2018, he was called up to train with the senior Brazil team, but he did not make a senior debut.

== Career statistics ==
As of match played 22 January 2026

Appearances and goals by club, season and competition
Club	Season	League			State league (Note: Includes Campeonato Gaúcho)		National cup (Note: Includes Ukrainian Cup, Coupe de France, FA Cup, Turkish Cup, Greek Football Cup)		Europe		Other		Total	
Club	Season	Division	Apps	Goals	Apps	Goals	Apps	Goals	Apps	Goals	Apps	Goals	Apps	Goals
Shakhtar Donetsk	2018–19	Ukrainian Premier League	8	2	—		2	2	0	0	0	0	10	4
Shakhtar Donetsk	2019–20	Ukrainian Premier League	26	8	—		0	0	7 (Note: Three appearances and one goal in UEFA Champions League, four appearances in UEFA Europa League)	1	1 (Note: Appearance in Ukrainian Super Cup)	0	34	9
Shakhtar Donetsk	2020–21	Ukrainian Premier League	24	6	—		1	0	10 (Note: Six appearances and one goal in UEFA Champions League, four appearances and one goal in UEFA Europa League)	2	1	0	36	8
Shakhtar Donetsk	2021–22	Ukrainian Premier League	17	9	—		1	0	10 (Note: Appearances in UEFA Champions League)	1	0	0	28	10
Shakhtar Donetsk	Total		75	25	—		4	2	27	4	2	0	108	31
Lyon (loan)	2021–22	Ligue 1	9	2	—		—		2 (Note: Appearances in UEFA Europa League)	0	—		11	2
Lyon (loan)	2022–23	Ligue 1	17	6	—		2	0	—		—		19	6
Lyon (loan)	Total		26	8	—		2	0	2	0	—		30	8
Leicester City (loan)	2022–23	Premier League	13	1	—		1	0	—		—		14	1
Galatasaray	2023–24	Süper Lig	33	0	—		3	2	9 (Note: Seven appearances and one goal in UEFA Champions League, two appearances in UEFA Europa League)	1	0	0	45	3
Panathinaikos	2024–25	Super League Greece	31	5	—		3	0	15 (Note: Three appearances and one goal in UEFA Europa League, twelve appearances and five goals in UEFA Conference League)	6	—		49	11
Panathinaikos	2025–26	Super League Greece	13	2	—		2	0	12 (Note: Two appearances in UEFA Champions League, ten appearances in UEFA Europa League)	0	—		27	2
Panathinaikos	Total		44	7	—		5	0	27	6	—		76	13
Grêmio	2026	Série A	0	0	1	0	0	0	0	0	—		1	0
Career total			193	41	1	0	15	4	65	11	2	0	274	85

== Honours ==
Shakhtar Donetsk

- Ukrainian Premier League: 2018–19, 2019–20
- Ukrainian Cup: 2018–19
- Ukrainian Super Cup: 2021

Galatasaray

- Süper Lig: 2023–24
- Turkish Super Cup: 2023

Grêmio

- Campeonato Gaúcho: 2026
