= İlhami Siraçhan Nas =

Turkish footballer

Personal information
- Full name: İlhami Siraçhan Nas
- Date of birth: 20 June 2002 (age 24)
- Place of birth: Samsun, Turkey
- Height: 1.77 m (5 ft 10 in)
- Position: Attacking midfielder

Team information
- Current team: Adana 01 FK

Youth career
- 2014–2015: Elazığspor
- 2015: Sivasspor
- 2015–2017: Yolspor
- 2017–2019: Çayyolu Spor
- 2019–2020: Osmanlıspor FK

Senior career*
Years	Team	Apps	(Gls)
2020–2023	Ankaraspor	38	(5)
2021–2022	→ Sivas Belediye (loan)	34	(3)
2023–2026	Galatasaray	0	(0)
2023–2024	→ Ümraniyespor (loan)	24	(3)
2024–2025	→ Boluspor (loan)	10	(2)
2025–2026	→ Kahramanmaraş İstiklal Spor (loan)	23	(2)
2026–	Adana 01 FK	0	(0)
- * Club domestic league appearances and goals as of 1 March 2025

İlhami Siraçhan Nas (born 20 June 2002) is a Turkish professional footballer who plays as an attacking midfielder for 2. Lig club Adana 01 FK.

== Career ==
=== Galatasaray ===
On 12 August 2023, he signed a 5-year contract with Galatasaray.

==== Ümraniyespor (loan) ====
On 30 August 2023, it was announced that he signed a one-year temporary contract with Ümraniyespor.

==== Boluspor (loan) ====
On August 27, 2024, it was announced that he was loaned to Boluspor until the end of the 2024–25 season.

==== Kahramanmaraş İstiklal Spor (loan) ====
On September 11, 2025, it was announced that he was loaned to Kahramanmaraş İstiklal Spor until the end of the 2025–26 season.

==== Return to Galatasaray after loan ====
On September 4, 2026, his contract with Galatasaray was mutually terminated.
