= 2023 Turkish Super Cup =

- Event: Turkish Super Cup
Galatasaray	Fenerbahçe
3	0
- Forfeited
- Date: 7 April 2024
- Venue: Şanlıurfa 11 Nisan Stadium, Şanlıurfa
- Referee: Volkan Bayarslan

The 2023 Turkish Super Cup, also known as 2023 Turkcell Super Cup (Turkish: 2023 Turkcell Süper Kupa) for sponsorship reasons, was the 50th edition of the Turkish Super Cup since its establishment as Presidential Cup in 1966, the annual Turkish football match contested by the winners of the previous season's top league and cup competitions (or cup runner-up in case the league- and cup-winning club is the same). The game, originally scheduled for 29 December 2023, between Galatasaray and Fenerbahçe, was intended to take place at the Al-Awwal Park in Riyadh, Saudi Arabia; however, it did not proceed as planned due to disagreements between the involved clubs and Saudi authorities.

Following this development, the Turkish Football Federation announced that the rescheduled game would take place on 7 April 2024 at the Şanlıurfa 11 Nisan Stadium in Şanlıurfa, Turkey.

The match was abandoned after just 1 minute, when Fenerbahçe (who fielded their U19's squad) walked off the pitch in protest of an alleged unfair testament, resulting in the referee to have no option but to abandon the game. As a result of this, Galatasaray celebrated winning the Super Cup. On 11 April 2024, TFF announced that Fenerbahçe had been sanctioned with a forfeit with a 3–0 loss of the game.

== Background ==
On 24 July 2023, the Turkish Football Federation announced that the Turkish Super Cup between the Süper Lig champions Galatasaray and the Turkish Cup champions Fenerbahçe would be held during the midseason break, citing congestion in the European cup schedules of both clubs as the rationale.

Dursun Özbek, the president of Galatasaray, responded to inquiries regarding the possibility of holding the Super Cup in Baku, the capital of Azerbaijan, stating that the decision rests with the federation. He expressed enthusiasm for the prospect, highlighting the positive experiences Galatasaray fans have had in Azerbaijan, comparable to those in Turkey. Özbek considered it an elegant idea and believed it would bring happiness to their counterparts in Azerbaijan. He mentioned plans to establish contact with relevant individuals to explore the possibility further and expressed hope that it would come to fruition.

On 8 September 2023, the Turkish Football Federation president Mehmet Büyükekşi conveyed a keen interest in hosting the Super Cup abroad, explicitly referring to Saudi Arabia's substantial interest in making significant investments in football. He elaborated that Saudi Arabia is actively investing in football, particularly emphasizing its impact on enhancing the country's global image. Büyükekşi pointed out the presence of both Italian and Spanish tournaments in the region. Additionally, he mentioned that the first meeting with the president of the Saudi Arabian Football Federation (SAFF) occurred in Sydney, Australia, where initial proposals were presented. While refraining from providing further details due to the absence of a clear outcome, he indicated that, in principle, the consideration of hosting the Super Cup in Saudi Arabia was underway.

On 20 October 2023, the Turkish Football Federation announced that the Super Cup would be played on 30 December 2023, at the Al-Awwal Park in Riyadh, the capital of Saudi Arabia. Following the announcement, the decision faced backlash from fans due to coinciding with the 100th anniversary of the establishment of the Republic of Turkey. Supporters expressed their preference for such a significant match to be played within the country in this momentous year.

In early November 2023, the Fenerbahçe High Council recommended that the Super Cup match be played at either the Atatürk Olympic Stadium or the Samsun 19 Mayıs Stadium. Similarly, the Galatasaray Council expressed a desire for the Super Cup to take place in Turkey. In a unanimously issued statement, it was conveyed that, for the cup of the century, known as the "Republic Cup" in the centennial year, they want it to be played in the Turkish homeland. According to the statement, this desire was grounded in the significance of the centennial year, symbolizing the culmination of a century of Turkish history earned and safeguarded by the blood, vitality, intellect, and wisdom of their ancestors. However, Büyükekşi defended the decision to hold the match in Saudi Arabia despite objections from the clubs, pointing out that Spain and Italy also host their tournaments there.

=== Ceremonial disagreement ===
Fenerbahçe's desire to participate in the opening ceremony with banners reading the phrase "Peace at Home, Peace in the World", and Galatasaray's intention to display the phrase "How happy is the one who says I am a Turk", along with warming up in Mustafa Kemal Atatürk-themed t-shirts before the match, were met with disapproval by Saudi officials. The disagreement stemmed from the Saudi authorities' refusal to accept these requests and their insistence on playing the national anthem of Saudi Arabia during the ceremony. Consequently, both sides refused to play, resulting in the cancellation of the match. A joint statement released by the teams and Turkish Football Federation later on said the game was postponed due to "glitches", without elaborating.

In a press release, the organizer Riyadh Season placed the blame on the teams. The clubs' decision not to play received unanimous support within Turkey. Beşiktaş JK, MKE Ankaragücü and Samsunspor shared their support and publicly offered their home fields for the match while other Turkish football teams, players from both sides, players of other clubs and other organizations responded by sharing Atatürk's pictures and words. Metro İstanbul, the operator of Istanbul Metro, encouraged fans to use public transport to welcome the teams at Istanbul's airports. Mayor of Beşiktaş, Rıza Akpolat, stated that the street where the Saudi Arabian consulate general of Istanbul is situated on will be named after Fahreddin Pasha, the Ottoman commander during the siege of Medina. It was also reported that S Sport, a Turkish sports network and subscription service, which holds rights to broadcast Saudi Pro League in Turkey, removed Saudi Pro League from their programming.

== Match ==
=== Details ===
7 April 2024
21:30 TRT (UTC+3)

Galatasaray	3–0	Fenerbahçe
Icardi 1'	Report

Şanlıurfa 11 Nisan Stadium, Şanlıurfa
Referee: Volkan Bayarslan

Win was awarded to Galatasaray as Fenerbahçe walked off the pitch in the 2nd minute, and sanctioned with a forfeit by TFF.

Galatasaray	Fenerbahçe

GK	1	(Uruguay) Fernando Muslera (c)
RB	23	(Turkey) Kaan Ayhan
CB	25	(Denmark) Victor Nelsson
CB	42	(Turkey) Abdülkerim Bardakcı
LB	17	(Germany) Derrick Köhn
CM	18	(Turkey) Berkan Kutlu
CM	34	(Uruguay) Lucas Torreira
AM	10	(Belgium) Dries Mertens
RW	53	(Turkey) Barış Alper Yılmaz
LW	7	(Turkey) Kerem Aktürkoğlu
CF	9	(Argentina) Mauro Icardi
Substitutes:
GK	19	(Turkey) Günay Güvenç
DF	6	(Colombia) Davinson Sánchez
DF	92	(Ivory Coast) Serge Aurier
MF	5	(Germany) Eyüp Aydın
MF	8	(Germany) Kerem Demirbay
MF	22	(Morocco) Hakim Ziyech
MF	91	(France) Tanguy Ndombele
FW	14	(Ivory Coast) Wilfried Zaha
FW	20	(Brazil) Tetê
FW	95	(Brazil) Carlos Vinícius
Manager:
(Turkey) Okan Buruk

GK	97	(Turkey) Furkan Onur Akyüz (c)
RB	55	(Turkey) Mustafa Emir Akyıldız
CB	56	(Turkey) Ümitcan Okan
CB	49	(Turkey) Muhammet İmre
LB	95	(Turkey) Yusuf Akçiçek
CM	92	(Turkey) Efekan Karayazı
CM	59	(Turkey) Kerem Kayaarası
AM	88	(Turkey) Zeki Dursun
RW	98	(Turkey) Emirhan Arkutcu
LW	58	(Turkey) Görkem İbrahim Demirel
CF	94	(Turkey) Çağrı Fedai
Substitutes:
GK	67	(Turkey) Doğukan Demir
DF	54	(Turkey) Yiğit Epözdemir
DF	96	(Turkey) Mehmet Can Gülerer
MF	57	(Turkey) Samet Seymen Sargın
Manager:
(Turkey) Zeki Murat Göle

Man of the Match:
Mauro Icardi (Galatasaray)

Assistant referees:
Serkan Olguncan
Serkan Ok
Fourth official:
Burak Şeker
Video assistant referee:
Koray Gençerler
Assistant video assistant referees:
Zorbay Küçük
Esat Sancaktar
Serkan Tokat

Match rules

- 90 minutes
- 30 minutes of extra time if necessary
- Penalty shoot-out if scores still level
- Ten named substitutes
- Maximum of five substitutions, with a sixth allowed in extra time (Note: Each team was given only three opportunities to make substitutions, with a fourth opportunity in extra time, excluding substitutions made at half-time, before the start of extra time and at half-time in extra time.)
