= Gökdeniz Gürpüz =

Turkish footballer (born 2006)

Personal information
- Date of birth: 25 February 2006 (age 20)
- Place of birth: Duisburg, Germany
- Height: 1.81 m (5 ft 11 in)
- Position: Midfielder

Team information
- Current team: 1. FC Saarbrücken
- Number: 8

Youth career
- –2014: Hamborn 07
- 2014–2016: FC Schalke 04
- 2016–2023: Borussia Dortmund
- 2023–2025: Galatasaray

Senior career*
Years	Team	Apps	(Gls)
2024–2026	Galatasaray	1	(0)
2026–	1. FC Saarbrücken	0	(0)

International career^{‡}
2021–2022	Germany U16	9	(1)
2022–2023	Turkey U17	9	(2)
2023–2024	Turkey U18	9	(2)
2024–2025	Turkey U19	12	(3)
- * Club domestic league appearances and goals as of 17 May 2026 ‡ National team caps and goals as of 25 March 2025

Gökdeniz Gürpüz (born 25 February 2006) is a professional footballer who plays as a midfielder for 3. Liga club 1. FC Saarbrücken. Born in Germany, he is a Turkey youth international.

== Early life ==
Gürpüz is a native of Duisburg, Germany.

== Club career ==
As a youth player, Gürpüz joined the youth academy of German side Hamborn 07. In 2014, he joined the youth academy of German side FC Schalke 04. In 2016, he joined the youth academy of German Bundesliga side Borussia Dortmund. In 2023, he joined the youth academy of Turkish side Galatasaray.

On 1 July 2026, he signed with German 3. Liga club 1. FC Saarbrücken.

== International career ==
Gürpüz has represented Turkey internationally at youth level. He has been regarded as one of the most promising prospects in Turkish football. He is eligible to represent Germany internationally, having been born in the country.

== Style of play ==
He mainly operates as a midfielder. He is right-footed.

== Personal life ==
He is the younger brother of Turkish footballer Göktan Gürpüz.

== Honours ==
Galatasaray

- Süper Lig: 2025–26
- Turkish Cup: 2024–25
