= 2024–25 Galatasaray S.K. season =

Galatasaray
2024–25 season
- President: Dursun Özbek
- Head coach: Okan Buruk
- Stadium: Rams Park
- Süper Lig: 1st
- Turkish Cup: Winners
- Turkish Super Cup: Runners-up
- UEFA Champions League: Play-off round
- UEFA Europa League: Knockout phase play-offs
- Top goalscorer: League: Victor Osimhen (26); All: Victor Osimhen (37)
- Highest home attendance: 52,795 vs Fenerbahçe, 24 February 2025, Süper Lig
- Lowest home attendance: 36,270 vs Adana Demirspor, 9 February 2025, Süper Lig
- Average home league attendance: 44,525
- Biggest win: 5–0 vs Rizespor (H), 14 September 2024, Süper Lig
- Biggest defeat: 0–5 vs Beşiktaş (N), 3 August 2024, Turkish Super Cup
Home colours	Away colours	Third colours

The 2024–25 season was the 120th season in the existence of Galatasaray S.K., and the club's 67th consecutive season in the top flight of Turkish football. In addition to the domestic league, Galatasaray participated in this season's edition of the Turkish Cup, Turkish Super Cup, UEFA Champions League and UEFA Europa League.

This was the final season to feature club legend Fernando Muslera. After 14 years and 19 trophies, Muslera would leave the team at the end of the season when his contract expired.

Additionally, this was the final season that Galatasaray's logo featured four stars. Having secured its 25th championship title at the end of the season, the team would add a fifth star to its logo.

== Season overview ==
=== Pre-season ===
On 7 June, head coach Okan Buruk signed a new two-year contract with the club.

On 28 June, Puma became the official jersey sponsor of Galatasaray. On 4 July, the club released their jerseys for the new season.

On 3 July, the yellow-reds started their preparations for the 2024–25 season with training at the Kemerburgaz Metin Oktay Facilities.

Galatasaray held its preparation camp in Austria ahead of the start of the 2024–25 season. The camp was held in two stages. From July 9 to July 18, the camp was held in Geinberg, while the second stage of the camp was held in Irdning from July 22 to July 27.

On 11 July, the Süper Lig fixtures were announced.

=== August ===
On 3 August, Galatasaray lost the Turkish Super Cup against Beşiktaş.

On 5 August, Galatasaray's opponent in the UEFA Champions League play-off round was selected to be BSC Young Boys from Switzerland.

On 28 August, Ali Yüce resigned from his position as a board member of Galatasaray Sports Club.

On 30 August, Galatasaray's opponents for the UEFA Europa League league phase were announced after Galatasaray lost both matches against BSC Young Boys in the UEFA Champions League play-off round, eliminating them from the tournament .

=== September ===
On 13 September, Galatasaray Football Director Cenk Ergün resigned.

On 4 September, Galatasaray signed Victor Osimhen on a one-year loan deal, making him one of the biggest signings in Süper Lig history.

On 25 September, Galatasaray President Dursun Özbek accepted the resignation of football director Cenk Ergün.

=== October ===
Galatasaray commenced October with a 1–0 home victory over Alanyaspor on 6 October, thanks to a first-half goal by Yunus Akgün. This was followed by a commanding 3–0 away win against Antalyaspor on 19 October, where Mauro Icardi scored twice and Victor Osimhen added a late goal. The month concluded with a significant 2–1 home win over arch-rivals Beşiktaş on 28 October, with goals from Davinson Sánchez and Osimhen securing the victory.

=== November ===
Osimhen made a significant impact in Europe by scoring his first UEFA goals for the club in a 3–2 home victory over Tottenham Hotspur in the Europa League, completing a brace within the opening minutes of the match. However, the celebration was tempered by a serious injury to Mauro Icardi, who was forced off the pitch with a knee injury in the second half. Icardi went down in pain as he attempted to close down a pass from Tottenham goalkeeper Fraser Forster. The club declared that he ruptured his ACL and damaged his meniscus and would undergo a "pre-operative rehabilitation" before an operation on his right knee. He was set to miss the rest of the season. In domestic action, Galatasaray earned a 3–2 win over Samsunspor on 10 November, where Michy Batshuayi and Osimhen again proved decisive. Later in the month, they defeated Bodrum FK 1–0 away, before being held to a 3–3 draw by Dynamo Kyiv in Europe, conceding a late equalizer after goals from Osimhen and Dries Mertens.

=== December ===
December opened with a 2–2 draw against Eyüpspor on 1 December, as Galatasaray rotated the squad amidst a congested fixture list. Barış Alper Yılmaz and Roland Sallai provided the goals in a spirited but defensively inconsistent display. On 10 December, promising centre-back Metehan Baltacı signed a contract extension through 2028.

=== January ===
The club's 26-match unbeaten streak across all competitions came to an end on 30 January with a 2–1 defeat to Ajax in the UEFA Europa League. Osimhen scored a consolation goal, but the result exposed the defensive frailties caused by Icardi's absence and fatigue from the packed schedule. Despite the loss of Icardi, Galatasaray opened the new year with solid domestic form. On 7 January, defender Ali Yeşilyurt extended his contract until 2028, signaling continued faith in local talent. A 1–1 draw against Hatayspor followed on 17 January, with Osimhen scoring from the penalty spot. On 23 January, the club strengthened its squad with the arrival of forward Ahmed Kutucu. Galatasaray returned to winning ways with a narrow 1–0 home victory over Konyaspor on 25 January, again relying on Osimhen's composure from the penalty spot.

=== February ===
On 9 February, Galatasaray and Adana Demirspor faced each other in the 23rd week of the Süper Lig. As the match was being played, with Gala leading 1–0, Adana Demirspor forfeited the match by withdrawing the team from the field in the 33rd minute. The match was canceled by referee Oğuzhan Çakır.

On 13 February, according to the statement published on the official website of the Turkish Football Federation, it was decided that Adana Demirspor, who withdrew from the field in the match against Galatasaray, would be deemed to have forfeited 3–0 and three points would be deducted.

=== March ===
Galatasaray began March with a 4–0 home victory over Antalyaspor on 14 March, where Victor Osimhen scored a hat-trick and Álvaro Morata added a goal via penalty. However, the team's momentum was halted on 29 March with a 2–1 defeat against arch-rivals Beşiktaş in the Bosphorus derby. This marked Galatasaray's first league loss of the season, during which Przemysław Frankowski received a red card in the 36th minute, and Lucas Torreira scored the equalizer before halftime. The match was decided by a second-half goal from Gedson Fernandes.

=== April ===
April was a pivotal month for Galatasaray. On 2 April, they faced Fenerbahçe in the Turkish Cup quarter-finals and secured a 2–1 victory, with both goals scored by Victor Osimhen. The match was marred by post-match altercations, notably when Fenerbahçe manager José Mourinho appeared to pinch Galatasaray coach Okan Buruk's nose, leading to his red card and widespread criticism.

In league play, Galatasaray rebounded from their March loss with a 2–0 away win over Samsunspor on 11 April, featuring goals from Yunus Akgün and Osimhen. They continued their strong form with a 2–0 home victory against Bodrum FK on 18 April, with goals from Lucas Torreira and Davinson Sánchez. On 22 April, Galatasaray faced Konyaspor in the Turkish Cup semi-finals and achieved a commanding 5–1 away win, advancing to the final.

The month concluded with a 5–1 away triumph over Eyüpspor on 27 April. Roland Sallai, Torreira, and Osimhen scored the first three goals, while Morata, coming on as a substitute in the 67th minute, assisted Osimhen and then scored twice himself in the 87th and 89th minutes.

=== May ===
Galatasaray commenced May with a dominant 4–1 home victory over Sivasspor on 3 May. Lucas Torreira opened the scoring, followed by a brace from Victor Osimhen and a goal from Barış Alper Yılmaz. This win extended Galatasaray's lead at the top of the Süper Lig to eight points over second-placed Fenerbahçe, which was lost to Beşiktaş at home in same week, bringing them closer to clinching the 25th Süper Lig title. Just 1 week later, on May 10, Galatasaray defeated Trabzonspor 2–0 away from home. This meant that the yellow-red team would secure the championship if they did not lose to Kayserispor the following week.

Just 4 days later, on 14 May, Galatasaray beat Trabzonspor 3–0 in 2025 Turkish Cup final and won the cup for 19th time.

Galatasaray secured the leadership with two weeks remaining by defeating Kayserispor 3–0 at home on 18 May 2025, becoming the first team in Turkish football history to earn the right to add a fifth star to their logo.

Galatasaray's experienced football player Dries Mertens ended his career in the red-yellow team with the İstanbul Başakşehir match played in the 38th and final week of the Süper Lig.

Galatasaray's legendary Uruguayan goalkeeper Fernando Muslera played his last match with the red-yellow jersey in the İstanbul Başakşehir match played in the 38th and final week of the Süper Lig. Muslera won a total of 19 trophies in his Galatasaray career.

== First team ==
=== First-team coaching staff ===
Position	Staff
Head Coach	(Turkey) Okan Buruk
Assistant Coach	(Turkey) İrfan Saraloğlu
Assistant Coach	(Spain) Ismael García Gómez
Goalkeeping Coach	(Turkey) Fadıl Koşutan
Goalkeeping Coach	(Turkey) Can Okuyucu
Athletic Performance Coach	(Turkey) Dursun Genç
Athletic Performance Coach	(Turkey) Kaan Arısoy
Athletic Performance Coach	(Turkey) Yusuf Köklü
Athletic Performance Coach	(Turkey) Gürkan Fuat Demir
Match and Performance Analyst	(Turkey) Yılmaz Yüksel
Match and Performance Analyst	(Turkey) Serhat Doğan
Match and Performance Analyst	(Turkey) M. Can Mutlu
Administrative Manager	(Turkey) Uğur Yıldız
Scouting and Performance Analysis Manager	(Turkey) Emre Utkucan
Research and Development Director	(Germany) (Turkey) Fatih Demireli
Doctor	(Turkey) Yener İnce
Doctor	(Turkey) Hakan Çelebi
Media and Communications Manager	(Turkey) Coşkun Gülbahar
Media Officer	(Turkey) Egehan Şengül
Interpreter	(Turkey) Ersan Zeren
Interpreter	(Turkey) Utku Yurtbil
Nutritionist	(Turkey) Mestan Hüseyin Çilekçi
Physiotherapist	(Turkey) Mustafa Korkmaz
Physiotherapist	(Turkey) Burak Koca
Physiotherapist	(Turkey) Samet Polat
Physiotherapist	(Turkey) Erkan Özyılmaz
Masseur	(Turkey) Sedat Peker
Masseur	(Turkey) Batuhan Erkan
Masseur	(Turkey) Ozan Abaylı
Masseur	(Turkey) Serdal Yılmaz
Material Manager	(Turkey) Hasan Çelik
Material Manager	(Turkey) Veli Muğlı
Material Manager	(Turkey) İlyas Gökçe

Last updated: 8 June 2024.
Source: Galatasaray.org

=== Staff changes ===
Change	Date	Staff member	Staff position	Ref.
Out	13 September 2024	(Turkey) Cenk Ergün	Football Director	

=== First-team squad ===
Notes:

- Players and squad numbers last updated on 18 May 2025. Age as of 30 June 2025.
- Flags indicate national team as defined under FIFA eligibility rules. Players may hold more than one non-FIFA nationality.

No.	Player	Nat.	Position(s)	Date of birth (Age)	Signed in	Contract ends	Transfer fee	Ref.
Goalkeepers
1	Fernando Muslera (captain)	(Uruguay) (Italy)	GK	16 June 1986 (aged 39)	2011	2025	€6,750,000 + Lorik Cana	
19	Günay Güvenç	(Turkey) (Germany)	GK	25 June 1991 (aged 34)	2023	2026	€250,000	
38	Atakan Nuri Ordu	(Turkey)	GK	29 March 2005 (aged 20)	2023	2025	Youth system	
50	Jankat Yılmaz	(Turkey)	GK	16 August 2004 (aged 19)	2022	2027	Youth system	
Defenders
4	Ismail Jakobs	(Senegal) (Germany)	LB	17 August 1999 (aged 25)	2024	2025	Loan	
6	Davinson Sánchez	(Colombia)	CB	12 June 1996 (aged 29)	2023	2027	€9,500,000	
17	Eren Elmalı	(Turkey)	LB	7 July 2000 (aged 24)	2025	2028	€3,500,000	
23	Kaan Ayhan	(Turkey) (Germany)	CB	10 November 1994 (aged 30)	2023	2027	€2,800,000	
24	Elias Jelert	(Denmark)	RB	12 June 2003 (aged 22)	2024	2029	€9,000,000	
26	Carlos Cuesta	(Colombia)	CB	9 March 1999 (aged 26)	2025	2028	€8,000,000	
42	Abdülkerim Bardakcı	(Turkey)	CB	7 September 1994 (aged 30)	2022	2026	€2,800,000	
65	Kadir Subaşı	(Turkey)	LB	27 August 2006 (aged 18)	2022	2027	Youth system	
90	Metehan Baltacı	(Turkey)	CB	3 November 2002 (aged 22)	2021	2028	Youth system	
91	Arda Ünyay	(Turkey)	CB	18 January 2007 (aged 18)	2025	2028	€500,000	
Midfielders
5	Eyüp Aydın	(Germany) (Turkey)	DM	2 August 2004 (aged 20)	2023	2026	€250,000	
7	Roland Sallai	(Hungary)	RW	22 May 1997 (aged 28)	2024	2028	€6,000,000	
8	Kerem Demirbay	(Germany) (Turkey)	CM	3 July 1993 (aged 31)	2023	2026	€3,700,000	
11	Yunus Akgün	(Turkey)	RW	7 July 2000 (aged 24)	2018	2026	Youth system	
18	Berkan Kutlu (vice-captain)	(Turkey) (Switzerland)	CM	25 January 1998 (aged 27)	2021	2026	Undisclosed	
20	Gabriel Sara	(Brazil)	CM	26 June 1999 (aged 26)	2024	2029	€18,000,000	
29	Przemysław Frankowski	(Poland)	RW/RWB	12 April 1995 (aged 30)	2025	2025	Loan	
30	Yusuf Demir	(Austria)	RW	2 June 2003 (aged 22)	2022	2026	€6,000,000	
33	Gökdeniz Gürpüz	(Germany) (Turkey)	CM	1 March 2006 (aged 19)	2023	2026	€220,000	
34	Lucas Torreira	(Uruguay) (Spain)	DM	11 February 1996 (aged 29)	2022	2028	€6,000,000	
53	Barış Alper Yılmaz	(Turkey)	LW	23 May 2000 (aged 25)	2021	2027	Undisclosed	
67	Berat Luş	(Turkey)	LW	20 April 2007 (aged 18)	2024	2027	Youth system	
83	Efe Akman	(Turkey)	DM	20 March 2006 (aged 19)	2023	2028	Youth system	
99	Mario Lemina	(Gabon)	DM	1 September 1993 (aged 31)	2025	2026	€2,500,000	
Forwards
9	Mauro Icardi (3rd captain)	(Argentina) (Italy)	CF	19 February 1993 (aged 32)	2022	2026	€10,000,000	
10	Dries Mertens	(Belgium)	CF	6 May 1987 (aged 38)	2022	2025	Free	
21	Ahmed Kutucu	(Turkey) (Germany)	CF	1 March 2000 (aged 25)	2025	2028	€5,962,500	
45	Victor Osimhen	(Nigeria)	CF	29 December 1998 (aged 26)	2024	2025	Loan	
77	Álvaro Morata	(Spain)	CF	23 October 1992 (aged 32)	2025	2026	Loan	
Player(s) on loan during the season
4	Mathias Ross	(Denmark)	CB	15 January 2001 (aged 24)	2022	2026	€1,750,000	
12	Batuhan Şen	(Turkey)	GK	3 February 1999 (aged 26)	2019	2026	Youth system	
14	Wilfried Zaha	(Ivory Coast) (England)	RW	10 November 1992 (aged 32)	2023	2026	Free	
17	Derrick Köhn	(Germany)	LB	4 February 1999 (aged 26)	2024	2026	€3,350,000	
21	Halil Dervişoğlu	(Turkey) (Netherlands)	CF	8 December 1999 (aged 25)	2023	2027	€500,000	
25	Victor Nelsson	(Denmark)	CB	14 October 1998 (aged 26)	2021	2027	€7,000,000	
47	İlhami Siraçhan Nas	(Turkey)	AM	20 June 2002 (aged 23)	2023	2028	€337,000	
48	Taylan Antalyalı	(Turkey)	DM	8 January 1995 (aged 30)	2019	2026	Free	
50	Jankat Yılmaz	(Turkey)	GK	16 August 2004 (aged 20)	2022	2027	Youth system	
56	Baran Demiroğlu	(Turkey)	CF	2 May 2005 (aged 20)	2023	2028	Youth system	
58	Ali Yeşilyurt	(Turkey)	CB	30 July 2005 (aged 19)	2023	2028	Youth system	
63	Baran Aksaka	(Turkey)	AM	29 January 2003 (aged 22)	2022	2026	Youth system	
64	Eren Aydın	(Turkey)	CF	12 February 2003 (aged 22)	2022	2026	Youth system	
72	Ali Turap Bülbül	(Turkey)	RB	25 January 2005 (aged 20)	2023	2027	Youth system	
88	Kazımcan Karataş	(Turkey)	LB	16 January 2003 (aged 22)	2022	2027	€1,150,000	
–	Nicolò Zaniolo	(Italy)	AM	2 July 1999 (aged 25)	2023	2027	€15,000,000	
–	Ali Efe Çördek	(Turkey)	LW	6 May 2005 (aged 20)	2024	2028	Undisclosed	
Player(s) transferred out during the season
7	Kerem Aktürkoğlu	(Turkey)	LW	21 October 1998 (aged 26)	2020	2026	Free	
15	Léo Dubois	(France)	RB	14 September 1994 (aged 30)	2022	2025	€2,500,000	
22	Hakim Ziyech	(Morocco) (Netherlands)	AM	19 March 1993 (aged 32)	2023	2026	Free	
27	Sérgio Oliveira	(Portugal)	CM	2 June 1992 (aged 33)	2022	2026	€3,000,000	
33	Alexandru Cicâldău	(Romania)	AM	8 July 1997 (aged 27)	2021	2026	€6,500,000	
44	Michy Batshuayi	(Belgium) (Democratic Republic of the Congo)	CF	2 October 1993 (aged 31)	2024	2027	Free	

== New contracts and transfers ==
=== New contracts ===
Date	No.	Pos.	Player	Transferred from	Fee	Team	Source
28 June 2024	22	MF	(Morocco) Hakim Ziyech	(England) Chelsea	Free	First team	

=== Contract extensions ===
Date	No.	Pos.	Player	Status	Contract length	Contract ends	Team	Source
3 July 2024	10	FW	(Belgium) Dries Mertens	Extended	One-year	30 June 2025	First team	
13 July 2024	83	MF	(Turkey) Efe Akman	Extended	Four-year	30 June 2028	First team	
29 July 2024	50	GK	(Turkey) Jankat Yılmaz	Extended	Two-year	30 June 2027	First team	
14 August 2024	56	FW	(Turkey) Baran Demiroğlu	Extended	Three-year	30 June 2028	First team	
10 December 2024	90	DF	(Turkey) Metehan Baltacı	Extended	Two-year	30 June 2028	First team	
7 January 2025	58	DF	(Turkey) Ali Yeşilyurt	Extended	Three-year	30 June 2028	First team	
7 January 2025	–	FW	(Turkey) Recep Yalın Dilek	Extended	Three-year	30 June 2028	Academy	
22 January 2025	–	MF	(Turkey) Berat Yılmaz	Extended	Three-year	30 June 2028	Academy	
17 April 2025	34	MF	(Uruguay) Lucas Torreira	Extended	Two-year	30 June 2028	First team	
17 April 2025	65	LB	(Turkey) Kadir Subaşı	Extended	Two-year	30 June 2027	First team	
30 April 2025	23	DF	(Turkey) Kaan Ayhan	Extended	One-year	30 June 2027	First team	

=== Transfers in ===
Date	No.	Pos.	Player	Transferred from	Fee	Team	Source
30 June 2024	–	GK	(Turkey) Berk Balaban	(Turkey) Isparta 32 Spor	Loan return	First team	
30 June 2024	–	GK	(Turkey) Batuhan Şen	(Turkey) Gaziantep	Loan return	First team	
30 June 2024	–	DF	(Denmark) Mathias Ross	(Netherlands) NEC	Loan return	First team	
30 June 2024	–	DF	(Turkey) Kazımcan Karataş	(Turkey) Ankaragücü	Loan return	First team	
30 June 2024	–	DF	(Turkey) Emin Bayram	(Belgium) Westerlo	Loan return	First team	
30 June 2024	–	DF	(France) Léo Dubois	(Turkey) İstanbul Başakşehir	Loan return	First team	
30 June 2024	–	DF	(Turkey) Metehan Baltacı	(Turkey) Eyüpspor	Loan return	First team	
30 June 2024	–	DF	(Turkey) Işık Kaan Arslan	(Turkey) Fethiyespor	Loan return	First team	
30 June 2024	–	MF	(Romania) Alexandru Cicâldău	(Turkey) Konyaspor	Loan return	First team	
30 June 2024	–	MF	(Turkey) Baran Aksaka	(Turkey) Şanlıurfaspor	Loan return	First team	
30 June 2024	–	MF	(Turkey) İlhami Siraçhan Nas	(Turkey) Ümraniyespor	Loan return	First team	
30 June 2024	–	MF	(Turkey) Yunus Akgün	(England) Leicester City	Loan return	First team	
30 June 2024	–	MF	(Turkey) Caner Doğan	(Turkey) Sarıyer	Loan return	First team	
30 June 2024	–	MF	(Turkey) Emirhan Kayar	(Turkey) Beyoğlu Yeni Çarşı FK	Loan return	First team	
30 June 2024	–	MF	(Italy) Nicolò Zaniolo	(England) Aston Villa	Loan return	First team	
30 June 2024	–	MF	(Austria) Yusuf Demir	(Switzerland) Basel	Loan return	First team	
30 June 2024	–	MF	(Turkey) Taylan Antalyalı	(Turkey) Samsunspor	Loan return	First team	
30 June 2024	–	FW	(Turkey) Halil Dervişoğlu	(Turkey) Hatayspor	Loan return	First team	
30 June 2024	–	FW	(Turkey) Eren Aydın	(Turkey) Çorum FK	Loan return	First team	
1 July 2024	44	FW	(Belgium) Michy Batshuayi	(Turkey) Fenerbahçe	Free	First team	
25 July 2024	24	DF	(Denmark) Elias Jelert	(Denmark) Copenhagen	€9,000,000	First team	
4 August 2024	20	MF	(Brazil) Gabriel Sara	(England) Norwich City	€18,000,000	First team	
12 September 2024	–	MF	(Turkey) Ali Efe Çördek	(Turkey) Bulvarspor	Undisclosed	First team	
13 September 2024	7	MF	(Hungary) Roland Sallai	(Germany) SC Freiburg	€6,000,000	First team	
23 January 2025	21	FW	(Turkey) (Germany) Ahmed Kutucu	(Turkey) Eyüpspor	€5,962,500	First team	
5 February 2025	99	MF	(Gabon) Mario Lemina	(England) Wolverhampton Wanderers	€2,500,000	First team	
6 February 2025	26	DF	(Colombia) Carlos Cuesta	(Belgium) Genk	€8,000,000	First team	
11 February 2025	91	DF	(Turkey) Arda Ünyay	(Turkey) Ankaragücü	€500,000	First team	
11 February 2025	17	DF	(Turkey) Eren Elmalı	(Turkey) Trabzonspor	€3,500,000	First team	

=== Transfers out ===
Date	No.	Pos.	Player	Transferred to	Fee	Team	Source
30 June 2024	22	MF	(Morocco) Hakim Ziyech	(England) Chelsea	Loan return	First team	
30 June 2024	91	MF	(France) Tanguy Ndombele	(England) Tottenham Hotspur	Loan return	First team	
30 June 2024	95	FW	(Brazil) Carlos Vinícius	(England) Fulham	Loan return	First team	
30 June 2024	81	MF	(Turkey) Hamza Akman	(Denmark) Sønderjyske	End of contract	First team	
30 June 2024	92	DF	(Ivory Coast) Serge Aurier		End of contract	First team	
25 July 2024	20	MF	(Brazil) Tetê	(Greece) Panathinaikos	€4,750,000	First team	
30 July 2024	40	DF	(Turkey) Emin Bayram	(Belgium) Westerlo	€4,000,000	First team	
30 July 2024	59	MF	(Turkey) Caner Doğan	(Turkey) Çorlu Spor 1947	Mutual agreement	First team	
31 July 2024	39	DF	(Turkey) Işık Kaan Arslan	(Turkey) Boluspor	Undisclosed	First team	
2 August 2024	43	MF	(Turkey) Emirhan Kayar	(Turkey) Çorlu Spor 1947	Mutual agreement	First team	
19 August 2024	98	GK	(Turkey) Berk Balaban	(Turkey) Isparta 32 Spor	Mutual agreement	First team	
31 August 2024	15	DF	(France) Léo Dubois	(Turkey) Eyüpspor	Mutual agreement	First team	
3 September 2024	7	MF	(Turkey) Kerem Aktürkoğlu	(Portugal) Benfica	€12,000,000	First team	
4 September 2024	27	MF	(Portugal) Sérgio Oliveira	(Greece) Olympiacos	Mutual agreement	First team	
9 September 2024	33	MF	(Romania) Alexandru Cicâldău	(Romania) Universitatea Craiova	Undisclosed	First team	
29 January 2025	22	MF	(Morocco) Hakim Ziyech	(Qatar) Al-Duhail SC	Mutual agreement	First team	
3 February 2025	44	FW	(Belgium) Michy Batshuayi	(Germany) Eintracht Frankfurt	€3,000,000	First team	

=== Loans in ===
Date	No.	Pos.	Player	From	Fee	Option to buy	Team	Source
2 September 2024	4	DF	(Senegal) Ismail Jakobs	(France) Monaco	€1,000,000	Yes	First team	
3 September 2024	45	FW	(Nigeria) Victor Osimhen	(Italy) Napoli	Free	No	First team	
2 February 2025	77	FW	(Spain) Álvaro Morata	(Italy) AC Milan	€6,000,000	Yes	First team	
10 February 2025	29	MF	(Poland) Przemysław Frankowski	(France) RC Lens	€1,000,000	Yes	First team	

=== Loans out ===
Date	No.	Pos.	Player	Transferred to	Fee	Until	Team	Source
5 July 2024	–	MF	(Italy) Nicolò Zaniolo	(Italy) Atalanta	€6,400,000	3 February 2025	First team	
16 July 2024	4	DF	(Denmark) Mathias Ross	(Czech Republic) Sparta Prague	Undisclosed	End of season	First team	
17 July 2024	63	MF	(Turkey) Baran Aksaka	(Bulgaria) Arda Kardzhali	Undisclosed	End of season	First team	
29 July 2024	50	GK	(Turkey) Jankat Yılmaz	(Turkey) Adanaspor	Undisclosed	End of season	First team	
29 July 2024	88	DF	(Turkey) Kazımcan Karataş	(Russia) Orenburg	Undisclosed	End of season	First team	
14 August 2024	56	FW	(Turkey) Baran Demiroğlu	(Turkey) Fatih Karagümrük	Undisclosed	End of season	First team	
27 August 2024	47	MF	(Turkey) İlhami Siraçhan Nas	(Turkey) Boluspor	Undisclosed	End of season	First team	
27 August 2024	64	FW	(Turkey) Eren Aydın	(Turkey) Boluspor	Undisclosed	13 January 2025	First team	
30 August 2024	17	DF	(Germany) Derrick Köhn	(Germany) Werder Bremen	Undisclosed	End of season	First team	
30 August 2024	14	MF	(Ivory Coast) (England) Wilfried Zaha	(France) Lyon	€3,000,000	22 January 2024	First team	
7 September 2024	48	DF	(Turkey) Taylan Antalyalı	(Turkey) Bodrum	Free	End of season	First team	
12 September 2024	–	MF	(Turkey) Ali Efe Çördek	(Turkey) Ankara Demirspor	Undisclosed	End of season	First team	
13 September 2024	21	FW	(Turkey) Halil Dervişoğlu	(Turkey) Gaziantep	Undisclosed	End of season	First team	
13 September 2024	72	DF	(Turkey) Ali Turap Bülbül	(Turkey) Ümraniyespor	Undisclosed	End of season	First team	
15 January 2025	64	FW	(Turkey) Eren Aydın	(Turkey) Sarıyer	Undisclosed	End of season	First team	
22 January 2025	–	MF	(Turkey) Berat Yılmaz	(Turkey) İskenderunspor	Undisclosed	End of season	Academy	
22 January 2025	14	MF	(Ivory Coast) (England) Wilfried Zaha	(United States) Charlotte FC	€2,680,000	17 January 2026	First team	
25 January 2025	12	GK	(Turkey) Batuhan Şen	(Turkey) Kocaelispor	Undisclosed	End of season	First team	
3 February 2025	–	MF	(Italy) Nicolò Zaniolo	(Italy) Fiorentina	€3,200,000	End of season	First team	
4 February 2025	25	DF	(Denmark) Victor Nelsson	(Italy) Roma	€500,000	End of season	First team	
12 February 2025	58	DF	(Turkey) Ali Yeşilyurt	(Moldova) Zimbru Chișinău	Undisclosed	26 January 2026	First team	

=== Transfer summary ===
"Undisclosed fees as well as additional bonuses which may be applicable and might affect the transfer income are not included in transfer amounts"

Expenditure

Summer: ▼€34,186,000

Winter: ▼€22,460,000

Total: ▼€56,646,000

Income

Summer: ▲€30,950,000

Winter: ▲€9,400,000

Total: ▲€40,350,000

Net totals

Summer: ▼€3,236,000

Winter: ▼€13,060,000

Total: ▼€16,296,000

== Kits ==
Galatasaray's 2024–25 kits, manufactured by Puma, were unveiled on 4 July 2024 and went on sale on the same day.

=== Sponsor ===
- Supplier: Puma
- Main sponsor: Sixt
- Main sponsor (Europe): SOCAR
- Back sponsor: Pasifik Holding
- Sleeve sponsor: Bilyoner, Arkham Intelligence
- Sleeve sponsor (Europe): Turkish Airlines
- Side sponsor: Alpcans
- Short sponsor: AHL Pay, Pasha Group
- Socks sponsor: NGN

=== Match ===
Home
Home alt.
Away
Away alt.
Third
Fourth
Goalkeeper 1
Goalkeeper 2
Goalkeeper 3

== Friendlies ==
Win Draw Loss Fixtures

=== Pre-season ===
11 July 2024 Summer Series Upper Austria	LASK (Austria)	3–2	(Turkey) Galatasaray	Linz, Austria
19:30 CEST	Dubois 23' (o.g.); Copado 64'; Koné 85'	Report 1 Report 2 Report 3	Baltacı 56', 71'	Stadium: Raiffeisen Arena; Attendance: 9,230; Referee: Julian Weinberger

15 July 2024 Summer Series Upper Austria	Galatasaray (Turkey)	2–5	(Germany) Fortuna Düsseldorf	Linz, Austria
19:30 CEST	Demirbay 35'; Mertens 59'	Report 1 Report 2 Report 3	Iyoha 22'; Niemiec 25'; Schmidt 64'; Zimmermann 73'; Affo 83'	Stadium: Raiffeisen Arena; Attendance: 4,000; Referee: Harald Lechner

18 July 2024 Summer Series Upper Austria	Galatasaray (Turkey)	4–1	(Slovakia) Trenčín	Linz, Austria
19:30 CEST	Köhn 7'; Ziyech 22'; Mertens 48'; Batshuayi 58'	Report 1 Report 2 Report 3	Uchegbu 82'	Stadium: Raiffeisen Arena; Attendance: 1,000; Referee: Walter Altmann

24 July 2024 Summer Series Upper Austria	Galatasaray (Turkey)	2–1	(Italy) Lecce	Linz, Austria
19:30 CEST	Ziyech 9'; Zaha 40'	Report 1 Report 2 Report 3	Gaspar 85'	Stadium: Raiffeisen Arena; Referee: Stefan Ebner

27 July 2024 Summer Series Upper Austria	Galatasaray (Turkey)	0–2	(Italy) Parma	Linz, Austria
20:15 CEST		Report 1 Report 2 Report 3	Hernani 42'; Man 70'	Stadium: Raiffeisen Arena; Referee: Alan Kijas

=== Mid-season ===
8 September 2024	Galatasaray (Turkey)	8–3	(Turkey) Esenler Erokspor	Istanbul, Turkey
18:30 TRT	Sara 12'; Batshuayi 27', 70', 73'; Demir 35'; Torreira 40'; Mertens 62'; Dervişoğlu 64'	Report 1 Report 2	Faye 10', 20'; Čataković 67'	Stadium: Florya Metin Oktay Facilities

== Competitions ==
=== Overall record ===
Competition	First match	Last match	Starting round	Final position	Record							
Competition	First match	Last match	Starting round	Final position	Pld	W	D	L	GF	GA	GD	Win %
Süper Lig	9 August 2024	30 May 2025	Matchday 1	Winners	36	30	5	1	91	31	+60	83.33
Turkish Cup	8 January 2025	14 May 2025	Group stage	Winners	6	4	2	0	16	5	+11	66.67
Turkish Super Cup	3 August 2024		Final	Runners-up	1	0	0	1	0	5	−5	0.00
UEFA Champions League	21 August 2024	27 August 2024	Play-off round	Play-off round	2	0	0	2	2	4	−2	0.00
UEFA Europa League	25 September 2024	20 February 2025	League phase	Knockout phase play-offs	10	3	5	2	22	22	+0	30.00
Total					55	37	12	6	131	67	+64	67.27

Source: Soccerway

Competition won

=== Süper Lig ===
==== League table ====
Pos	Team	Pld	W	D	L	GF	GA	GD	Pts	Qualification or relegation
1	Galatasaray (C)	36	30	5	1	91	31	+60	95	Qualification for the Champions League league phase
2	Fenerbahçe	36	26	6	4	90	39	+51	84	Qualification for the Champions League third qualifying round
3	Samsunspor	36	19	7	10	55	41	+14	64	Qualification for the Europa League play-off round (Note: The 2024–25 Turkish Cup winners qualified for the Europa League play-off round. Since the cup winners (Galatasaray) qualified based on league position, the Europa League play-off round spot was passed to the third-placed team, the Europa League second round spot was passed to the fourth-placed team, and the Conference League spot was passed to the fifth-placed team.)
4	Beşiktaş	36	17	11	8	59	36	+23	62	Qualification for the Europa League second qualifying round
5	Başakşehir	36	16	6	14	60	56	+4	54	Qualification for the Conference League second qualifying round

Source: Süper Lig
Rules for classification: 1) Points; 2) Head-to-head points; 3) Head-to-head goal difference; 4) Head-to-head goals scored; 5) Goal difference; 6) Goals scored; 7) Play-off.
(Note: Head-to-head record is used only after all the matches between the teams in question have been played)
(C) Champions

==== Results summary ====
Overall								Home						Away					
Pld	W	D	L	GF	GA	GD	Pts	W	D	L	GF	GA	GD	W	D	L	GF	GA	GD
36	30	5	1	91	31	+60	95	15	3	0	46	15	+31	15	2	1	45	16	+29

Source: TFF.org

Pld = Matches played; W = Matches won; D = Matches drawn; L = Matches lost; GF = Goals for; GA = Goals against; GD = Goal difference; Pts = Points

==== Results by round ====
Round	1	2	3	4	5	6	7	8	9	10	11	12	13	14	15	16	17	18	19	20	21	22	23	24	25	26	27	28	29	30	31	32	33	34	35	36	37	38
Ground	H	A	H	A	H	A	H	H	A	H	B	H	A	H	A	H	A	H	A	A	H	A	H	A	H	A	A	H	A	B	A	H	A	H	A	H	A	H
Result	W	W	W	W	W	W	D	W	W	W	B	W	W	D	W	W	W	W	W	D	W	W	W	W	D	D	W	W	L	B	W	W	W	W	W	W	W	W
Position	3	2	1	1	1	1	1	1	1	1	1	1	1	1	1	1	1	1	1	1	1	1	1	1	1	1	1	1	1	1	1	1	1	1	1	1	1	1
Points	3	6	9	12	15	18	19	22	25	28	28	31	34	35	38	41	44	47	50	51	54	57	60	63	64	65	68	71	71	71	74	77	80	83	86	89	92	95

Source: TFF.org
A = Away; H = Home; B = Bye; W = Win; D = Draw; L = Loss

==== Score overview ====
Win Draw Loss

Opposition	Home score	Away score	Aggregate score	Double
Adana Demirspor	3–0	5–1	8–1	Yes
Alanyaspor	1–0	2–1	3–1	Yes
Antalyaspor	4–0	3–0	7–0	Yes
Başakşehir	2–0	2–1	4–1	Yes
Beşiktaş	2–1	1–2	3–3	No
Bodrum	2–0	1–0	3–0	Yes
Eyüpspor	2–2	5–1	7–3	No
Fenerbahçe	0–0	3–1	3–1	No
Gaziantep	3–1	1–0	4–1	Yes
Göztepe	2–1	2–0	4–1	Yes
Hatayspor	2–1	1–1	3–2	No
Kasımpaşa	3–3	3–3	6–6	No
Kayserispor	3–0	5–1	8–1	Yes
Konyaspor	1–0	2–1	3–1	Yes
Rizespor	5–0	2–1	7–1	Yes
Samsunspor	3–2	2–0	5–2	Yes
Sivasspor	4–1	3–2	7–3	Yes
Trabzonspor	4–3	2–0	6–3	Yes

==== Matches ====
The league fixtures were announced on 11 July 2024.

Win Draw Loss Postponed

9 August 2024 1	Galatasaray	2–1	Hatayspor	Sarıyer
21:00 TRT (UTC+3)	Icardi 80' (pen.); Batshuayi 90'	Report 1 Report 2 Report 3	Fernandes 52' (yellow card) 55'; Yılmaz (yellow card) 79'; Çörekçi (yellow card) 90+2'	Stadium: Rams Park; Attendance: 41,055; Referee: Turgut Doman; Assistant referees: Kerem Ersoy, Candaş Elbil; Fourth official: Burak Pakkan

16 August 2024 2	Konyaspor	1–2	Galatasaray	Konya
21:00 TRT (UTC+3)	Ülgün 45'; Nayir (yellow card) 80'	Report 1 Report 2 Report 3	Aktürkoğlu 41'; Yılmaz 59'; Demirbay (yellow card) 70'	Stadium: Konya Metropolitan Municipality Stadium; Attendance: 31,427; Referee: Direnç Tonusluoğlu; Assistant referees: Deniz Caner Özaral, Osman Gökhan Bilir; Fourth official: Erdem Mertoğlu

17 September 2024 3	Galatasaray	3–1	Gaziantep	Sarıyer
20:00 TRT (UTC+3)	Yılmaz 11'; Akgün 27'; Ayhan (yellow card) 36'; Batshuayi 77'	Report 1 Report 2 Report 3	Kozłowski (yellow card) 73'; Soyalp 81'	Stadium: Rams Park; Referee: Cihan Aydın; Assistant referees: Samet Çiçek, Suat Güz; Fourth official: Oğuzhan Çakır
Note: It was planned to be played on 24 August 2024, but it was postponed by the Turkish Football Federation due to the match between Galatasaray and Young Boys in the UEFA Champions League play-off round.

31 August 2024 4	Adana Demirspor	1–5	Galatasaray	Adana
21:45 TRT (UTC+3)	Burak (yellow card) 20'; Aydoğan (yellow card) 40'; Kol (yellow card) 50'; Sarı (penalty missed) 66; Gravillon 79' (pen.); Kalender (red card) 89'	Report 1 Report 2 Report 3	Aktürkoğlu 9'; Güler 17' (o.g.); Yılmaz 31'; Mertens 37'; Bardakcı 60'; Batshuayi (penalty missed) 89	Stadium: New Adana Stadium; Attendance: 14,113; Referee: Kadir Sağlam; Assistant referees: Samet Çavuş, Bersan Duran; Fourth official: Muhammet Ali Metoğlu

14 September 2024 5	Galatasaray	5–0	Çaykur Rizespor	Sarıyer
20:00 TRT (UTC+3)	Sánchez 3'; Bardakcı 25'; Sara 49'; Mertens 62'; Yılmaz 80'	Report 1 Report 2 Report 3		Stadium: Rams Park; Attendance: 43,496; Referee: Arda Kardeşler; Assistant referees: Hakan Yemişken, Abdullah Uğur Sarı; Fourth official: Adnan Deniz Kayatepe

21 September 2024 6	Fenerbahçe	1–3	Galatasaray	Kadıköy
20:00 TRT (UTC+3)	Yandaş (yellow card) 26'; Džeko 63' (pen.); Fred (yellow card) 71'; En-Nesyri (yellow card) 75'	Report 1 Report 2 Report 3	Torreira 20'; Mertens 28'; Akgün (yellow card) 30'; Sánchez (yellow card) 36'; Ayhan (yellow card) 43'; Sara 59'; Bardakcı (yellow card) 62'; Yılmaz (yellow card) 65'; Jakobs (yellow card) 71'	Stadium: Şükrü Saracoğlu Stadium; Attendance: 44,514; Referee: Atilla Karaoğlan; Assistant referees: Ceyhun Sesigüzel, Süleyman Özay; Fourth official: Abdullah Buğra Taşkınsoy

28 September 2024 7	Galatasaray	3–3	Kasımpaşa	Sarıyer
19:00 TRT (UTC+3)	Osimhen 20', 28'; Icardi 34'; Bardakcı (yellow card) 66'; Mertens (yellow card) 69'	Report 1 Report 2 Report 3	Fall 44' (yellow card) 87'; Hajradinović (yellow card) 57' (goal) 83' (pen.); Gül (yellow card) 77'; da Costa 90+5'	Stadium: Rams Park; Attendance: 42,810; Referee: Oğuzhan Çakır; Assistant referees: Mehmet Akıncık, Ali Can Alp; Fourth official: Ozan Ergün

6 October 2024 8	Galatasaray	1–0	Alanyaspor	Sarıyer
19:00 TRT (UTC+3)	Akgün 28'; Ayhan (yellow card) 68'; Muslera (yellow card) 90+2'	Report 1 Report 2 Report 3	Balkovec (yellow card) 6'; Richard (yellow card) 29'; Janvier (yellow card) 66'	Stadium: Rams Park; Attendance: 40,412; Referee: Mehmet Türkmen; Assistant referees: Deniz Caner Özaral, Samet Çavuş; Fourth official: Turgut Doman

19 October 2024 9	Antalyaspor	0–3	Galatasaray	Antalya
19:00 TRT (UTC+3)	Vural (yellow card) 42'; Djenepo (yellow card) 74'	Report 1 Report 2 Report 3	Icardi 10', 52'; Torreira (yellow card) 20'; Kutlu (yellow card) 39'; Sánchez (yellow card) 83'; Ziyech (yellow card) 90+2'; Osimhen 90+3'	Stadium: Antalya Stadium; Attendance: 19,349; Referee: Ali Şansalan; Assistant referees: Kerem Ersoy, İbrahim Çağlar Uyarcan; Fourth official: Alper Akarsu

28 October 2024 10	Galatasaray	2–1	Beşiktaş	Sarıyer
20:00 TRT (UTC+3)	Sánchez 13' (yellow card) 62'; Ayhan (yellow card) 36'; Yılmaz (yellow card) 45+1'; Osimhen 67'; Torreira (yellow card) 80'	Report 1 Report 2 Report 3	Destanoğlu (yellow card) 67'; Topçu (yellow card) 82'; Immobile (yellow card) 89'; Muçi 90+4'	Stadium: Rams Park; Attendance: 51,750; Referee: Arda Kardeşler; Assistant referees: Ceyhun Sesigüzel, Süleyman Özay; Fourth official: Muhammet Ali Metoğlu

November 2024 11	Bye

10 November 2024 12	Galatasaray	3–2	Samsunspor	Sarıyer
16:00 TRT (UTC+3)	Osimhen 3', 55' (yellow card) 34'; Muslera (yellow card) 49'; Sánchez (yellow card) 70'; Batshuayi 85'	Report 1 Report 2 Report 3	Bennasser (yellow card) 30' (goal) 90+2' (pen.); Ntcham 50' (pen.); Kılınç (yellow card) 55'; Tait (yellow card) 90+5'; Muja (yellow card) 90+7'	Stadium: Rams Park; Attendance: 47,584; Referee: Halil Umut Meler; Assistant referees: İbrahim Bozbey, Anıl Usta; Fourth official: Ayberk Demirbaş

23 November 2024 13	Bodrum	0–1	Galatasaray	Bodrum
19:00 TRT (UTC+3)	Bilsel (yellow card) 21' (yellow-red card) 45'; Yalçın (yellow card) 45+3'	Report 1 Report 2 Report 3	Bardakcı (yellow card) 45+8'; Batshuayi 54'; Sallai (yellow card) 68'	Stadium: Bodrum District Stadium; Attendance: 3,651; Referee: Muhammet Ali Metoğlu; Assistant referees: İbrahim Çağlar Uyarcan, Mehmet Kısal; Fourth official: Yiğit Arslan

1 December 2024 14	Galatasaray	2–2	Eyüpspor	Sarıyer
19:00 TRT (UTC+3)	Sánchez (yellow card) 23'; Osimhen (yellow card) 45+1'; Yılmaz 45+5'; Sallai 47', (yellow card) 50'	Report 1 Report 2 Report 3	Akbaba 13'; Claro (yellow card) 36'; Thiam (yellow card) 45+3'; Ampem 71', (yellow card) 84'; Özer (yellow card) 90'	Stadium: Rams Park; Attendance: 42,699; Referee: Oğuzhan Çakır; Assistant referees: Serkan Olguncan, Murat Ergin Gözütok; Fourth official: Reşat Onur Coşkunses

8 December 2024 15	Sivasspor	2–3	Galatasaray	Sivas
16:00 TRT (UTC+3)	Sundberg (yellow card) 1'; Rodrigues 25'; Koita (yellow card) 31'; Nikolić (yellow card) 45+8'; Baldé (yellow card) 77'; Böke 90+1'; Manaj (yellow card) 90+5'	Report 1 Report 2 Report 3	Baltacı (red card) 15'; Akgün 37'; Osimhen 45+9' (pen.); Yılmaz 53'; Mertens (yellow card) 60'; Sallai (yellow card) 77'; Batshuayi (yellow card) 90+2'; Demirbay (yellow card) 90+7'; Muslera (yellow card) End of the match'	Stadium: New Sivas 4 Eylül Stadium; Attendance: 11,849; Referee: Turgut Doman; Assistant referees: Ceyhun Sesigüzel, Furkan Ürün; Fourth official: Davut Dakul Çelik

16 December 2024 16	Galatasaray	4–3	Trabzonspor	Sarıyer
21:00 TRT (UTC+3)	Mertens 8'; Akgün 29'; Jelert (yellow card) 55'; Batshuayi 63' (pen.); Sallai (yellow card) 65'; Yılmaz (yellow card) 76'; Yılmaz 90+8' (o.g.)	Report 1 Report 2 Report 3	Saatçi (yellow card) 15'; Tufan 17', 55', (yellow card) 22'; Elmalı (yellow card) 30'; Banza 51'; Mendy (yellow card) 90+3'	Stadium: Rams Park; Attendance: 48,438; Referee: Kadir Sağlam; Assistant referees: Candaş Elbil, Anıl Usta; Fourth official: Erdem Mertoğlu

22 December 2024 17	Kayserispor	1–5	Galatasaray	Kayseri
16:00 TRT (UTC+3)	Bahoken 14'; Bourabia (yellow card) 70'	Report 1 Report 2 Report 3	Osimhen 4' (pen.), 71'; Yılmaz 29', 87'; Akgün 51'	Stadium: Kadir Has Stadium; Attendance: 17,955; Referee: Mehmet Türkmen; Assistant referees: Mehmet Emin Tuğral, Serkan Çimen; Fourth official: Yusuf Ziya Gündüz

4 January 2025 18	Galatasaray	2–1	Göztepe	Sarıyer
19:00 TRT (UTC+3)	Osimhen 10' (pen.); Sara (yellow card) 58'; Akgün 61'	Report 1 Report 2 Report 3	Djalma (yellow card) 9'; Rômulo 27'; Dennis (yellow card) 37'	Stadium: Rams Park; Attendance: 47,710; Referee: Alper Akarsu; Assistant referees: Abdullah Bora Özkara, Deniz Caner Özaral; Fourth official: Mehmet Ali Özer

12 January 2025 19	Başakşehir	1–2	Galatasaray	Başakşehir
19:00 TRT (UTC+3)	Opoku (yellow card) 13'; Güreler (yellow card) 37'; Kény (yellow card) 45'; Piątek 53', (yellow card) 74'	Report 1 Report 2 Report 3	Akgün (yellow card) 16'; Ayhan (yellow card) 21'; Torreira (yellow card) 31'; Yılmaz 42', 59'; Sallai (yellow card) 79'	Stadium: Başakşehir Fatih Terim Stadium; Attendance: 7,914; Referee: Atilla Karaoğlan; Assistant referees: İbrahim Bozbey, Ali Can Alp; Fourth official: Ayberk Demirtaş

17 January 2025 20	Hatayspor	1–1	Galatasaray	Mersin
20:00 TRT (UTC+3)	Sertel 28'; Diack (yellow card) 45'; Çörekçi (yellow card) 59'; Fernandes (yellow card) 72'; Bekaj (yellow card) 88'	Report 1 Report 2 Report 3	Ayhan (yellow card) 18'; Osimhen 56' (pen.)	Stadium: Mersin Stadium; Attendance: 21,785; Referee: Cihan Aydın; Assistant referees: Bersan Duran, Bahtiyar Birinci; Fourth official: Süleyman Bahadır

25 January 2025 21	Galatasaray	1–0	Konyaspor	Sarıyer
19:00 TRT (UTC+3)	Osimhen 22' (pen.); Akgün (yellow card) 32'; Kutucu (yellow card) 72'	Report 1 Report 2 Report 3	Jevtović (yellow card) 90+5'	Stadium: Rams Park; Attendance: 46,529; Referee: Halil Umut Meler; Assistant referees: Kerem Ersoy, Samet Çiçek; Fourth official: Batuhan Kolak

3 February 2025 22	Gaziantep	0–1	Galatasaray	Gaziantep
20:00 TRT (UTC+3)	Lungoyi (yellow card) 24'; Viana (yellow card) 27'; Sorescu (yellow card) 32'; Kızıldağ (yellow card) 51'	Report 1 Report 2 Report 3	Kutucu 5'; Torreira (yellow card) 36'; Sara (yellow card) 42'; Yılmaz (yellow card) 78'; Muslera (yellow card) 81'; Bardakcı (yellow card) 90+6'	Stadium: Gaziantep Stadium; Attendance: 16,002; Referee: Kadir Sağlam; Assistant referees: Süleyman Özay, Murat Ergin Gözütok; Fourth official: Burak Olcar

9 February 2025 23	Galatasaray	3–0; Ruled	Adana Demirspor	Sarıyer
19:00 TRT (UTC+3)	Morata 12' (pen.)	Report 1 Report 2 Report 3	Kurtulan (yellow card) 21'	Stadium: Rams Park; Attendance: 36,270; Referee: Oğuzhan Çakır; Assistant referees: İbrahim Çağlar Uyarcan, Volkan Ahmet Narinç; Fourth official: Davut Dakul Çelik
Note: Adana Demirspor withdrew from the field in the 33rd minute in protest against the refereing decision to award a penalty to Galatasaray in the 12th minute. The match was eventually suspended and a 3–0 victory was ruled for Galatasaray by the Turkish Football Federation four days later, with Adana Demirspor deemed to have voluntary departed from play.

17 February 2025 24	Çaykur Rizespor	1–2	Galatasaray	Rize
20:00 TRT (UTC+3)	David (yellow card) 35'; Pala (yellow card) 45+4'; Sowe 54'; Çetin (yellow card) 84'	Report 1 Report 2 Report 3	Cuesta (yellow card) 23'; Osimhen 47', 86'; Muslera (yellow card) 90+6'	Stadium: City of Rize Stadium; Attendance: 12,523; Referee: Zorbay Küçük; Assistant referees: Esat Sancaktar, Mustafa Savranlar; Fourth official: Yiğit Arslan

24 February 2025 25	Galatasaray	0–0	Fenerbahçe	Sarıyer
20:00 TRT (UTC+3)	Osimhen (yellow card) 38'; Yılmaz (yellow card) 85'; Sallai (yellow card) 88'; Sánchez (yellow card) 90+1'; Akgün (yellow card) 90+2'	Report 1 Report 2 Report 3	Söyüncü (yellow card) 48'; Fred (yellow card) 90+2'	Stadium: Rams Park; Attendance: 52,795; Referee: Slavko Vinčić; Assistant referees: Tomaž Klančnik, Andraž Kovačič; Fourth official: Kadir Sağlam

2 March 2025 26	Kasımpaşa	3–3	Galatasaray	Kasımpaşa
16:00 TRT (UTC+3)	Özcan (yellow card) 2'; Ben Ouanes (yellow card) 5', (goal) 52'; Brekalo (yellow card) 55', (goal) 61'; Hajradinović 85' (pen.)	Report 1 Report 2 Report 3	Osimhen 12' (pen.), 71'; Lemina (yellow card) 65', (goal) 69'; Cuesta (yellow card) 85'	Stadium: Recep Tayyip Erdoğan Stadium; Attendance: 5,194; Referee: Cihan Aydın; Assistant referees: Bersan Duran, Murat Ergin Gözütok; Fourth official: Burak Pakkan

9 March 2025 27	Alanyaspor	1–2	Galatasaray	Antalya
20:30 TRT (UTC+3)	Vilhena 23'; Aliti (yellow card) 74'; Lima (yellow card) 82'	Report 1 Report 2 Report 3	Yılmaz (yellow card) 26'; Güvenç (red card) 45'; Lemina (yellow card) 45+1'; Aliti 51' (o.g.); Elmalı (yellow card) 52'; Muslera (yellow card) 57'; Osimhen 62'; Morata (yellow card) 74'; Sallai (yellow card) 86'; Kutucu (yellow card) 90+2'	Stadium: Alanya Oba Stadium; Attendance: 7,753; Referee: Yasin Kol; Assistant referees: İbrahim Çağlar Uyarcan, Samet Çiçek; Fourth official: Abdullah Buğra Taşkınsoy

14 March 2025 28	Galatasaray	4–0	Antalyaspor	Sarıyer
20:30 TRT (UTC+3)	Osimhen 30', 45+3', 52'; Morata 45' (pen.)	Report 1 Report 2 Report 3	Kałuziński (yellow card) 11'; Rakip (yellow card) 36'; Thalisson (yellow card) 75'	Stadium: Rams Park; Attendance: 39,461; Referee: Ozan Ergün; Assistant referees: Ceygun Sesigüzel, Mehmet Kısal; Fourth official: Yiğit Arslan

29 March 2025 29	Beşiktaş	2–1	Galatasaray	Beşiktaş
20:30 TRT (UTC+3)	Silva 22'; Svensson (yellow card) 56'; Fernandes 66'; Masuaku (yellow card) 69'; Rashica (yellow card) 90+2'; Kılıçsoy (red card) 90+6'	Report 1 Report 2 Report 3	Frankowski (red card) 36'; Torreira 45'; Yılmaz (yellow card) 69'; Sánchez (yellow card) 87'; Kutucu (yellow card) 90+7'	Stadium: Tüpraş Stadyumu; Attendance: 41,843; Referee: Yasin Kol; Assistant referees: Abdullah Bora Özkara, Samet Çiçek; Fourth official: Çağdaş Altay

April 2025 30	Bye

11 April 2025 31	Samsunspor	0–2	Galatasaray	Samsun
20:00 TRT (UTC+3)	Ntcham (yellow card) 64'; van Drongelen (yellow card) 65'	Report 1 Report 2 Report 3	Akgün 14'; Elmalı (yellow card) 45+1'; Osimhen 47'; Sara (yellow card) 51'; Sallai (yellow card) 70'; Jakobs (yellow card) 85'	Stadium: Samsun 19 Mayıs Stadium; Attendance: 31,472; Referee: Ozan Ergün; Assistant referees: Mehmet Emin Tuğral, Candaş Elbil; Fourth official: Yiğit Arslan

18 April 2025 32	Galatasaray	2–0	Bodrum	Sarıyer
20:00 TRT (UTC+3)	Torreira 29'; Yılmaz (yellow card) 32'; Sánchez 81'	Report 1 Report 2 Report 3		Stadium: Rams Park; Attendance: 42,696; Referee: Mehmet Türkmen; Assistant referees: Esat Sancaktar, Serkan Çimen; Fourth official: Burak Olcar

27 April 2025 33	Eyüpspor	1–5	Galatasaray	Kasımpaşa
19:00 TRT (UTC+3)	Mor (yellow card) 51'; Ampem (yellow card) 70'; Claro 79'	Report 1 Report 2 Report 3	Sallai 29', (yellow card) 59'; Frankowski (yellow card) 36'; Torreira 56'; Osimhen 71'; Morata 87', 90'	Stadium: Recep Tayyip Erdoğan Stadium; Attendance: 7,764; Referee: Çağdaş Altay; Assistant referees: Süleyman Özay, Hüseyin Aylak; Fourth official: Ömer Tolga Güldibi

3 May 2025 34	Galatasaray	4–1	Sivasspor	Sarıyer
19:00 TRT (UTC+3)	Torreira 9'; Osimhen 15', 31'; Yılmaz 21'; Mertens (yellow card) 76'	Report 1 Report 2 Report 3	Manaj 33', (yellow card) 74'; Koita (yellow card) 90+2'	Stadium: Rams Park; Attendance: 45,495; Referee: Ozan Ergün; Assistant referees: İbrahim Çağlar Uyarcan, Esat Sancaktar; Fourth official: Reşat Onur Coşkunses

10 May 2025 35	Trabzonspor	0–2	Galatasaray	Trabzon
19:00 TRT (UTC+3)	Cham (yellow card) 58'	Report 1 Report 2 Report 3	Muslera (yellow card) 44'; Bardakcı 66'; Morata 84', (yellow card) 90+4'	Stadium: Şenol Güneş Sports Complex; Attendance: 35,167; Referee: Atilla Karaoğlan; Assistant referees: Ceyhun Sesigüzel, Osman Gökhan Bilir; Fourth official: Batuhan Kolak

18 May 2025 36	Galatasaray	3–0	Kayserispor	Sarıyer
19:00 TRT (UTC+3)	Sallai (yellow card) 14'; Osimhen 26'; Yılmaz 29', (yellow card) 31'; Sara (yellow card) 42'; Muslera 89' (pen.), (yellow card) 90+1'	Report 1 Report 2 Report 3	Bayazıt (yellow card) 87'; Civelek (yellow card) 90'	Stadium: Rams Park; Attendance: 50,143; Referee: Ali Şansalan; Assistant referees: Volkan Ahmet Narinç, Mehmet Kısal; Fourth official: Fatih Tokail

24 May 2025 37	Göztepe	0–2	Galatasaray	İzmir
19:00 TRT (UTC+3)	Héliton (yellow card) 10'; Lis (yellow card) 69'; Rômulo (yellow card) 89'	Report 1 Report 2 Report 3	Ayhan 70'; Morata 90+1'	Stadium: Gürsel Aksel Stadium; Attendance: 17,696; Referee: Batuhan Kolak; Assistant referees: Samet Çiçek, Erkan Akbulut; Fourth official: Yunus Dursun

30 May 2025 38	Galatasaray	2–0	Başakşehir	Sarıyer
20:00 TRT (UTC+3)	Mertens 17' (pen.); Osimhen (yellow card) 45+2', (goal) 81'; Frankowski (yellow card) 51'	Report 1 Report 2 Report 3	Ba (yellow card) 28'	Stadium: Rams Park; Attendance: 39,738; Referee: Abdullah Buğra Taşkınsoy; Assistant referees: Ceyhun Sesigüzel, Deniz Caner Özaral; Fourth official: Ömer Faruk Gültekin

=== Turkish Cup ===
==== Group stage ====
The draw for the group stage was held on 20 December 2024.

Pos	Team	Pld	W	D	L	GF	GA	GD	Pts	KON	GAL	BAŞ	EYÜ	ÇOR	BOL
1	Konyaspor	3	2	1	0	4	1	+3	7				3–1		
2	Galatasaray	3	1	2	0	6	3	+3	5	0–0		2–2			
3	İstanbul Başakşehir	3	1	2	0	6	3	+3	5					4–1	
4	Eyüpspor	3	1	1	1	2	3	−1	4			0–0			1–0
5	Çorum	3	1	0	2	3	6	−3	3	0–1					2–1
6	Boluspor	3	0	0	3	2	7	−5	0		1–4				

Legend: Blue = home team win; Yellow = draw; Red = away team win.

8 January 2025 1	Galatasaray	2–2	Başakşehir	Sarıyer
20:30 TRT (UTC+3)	Torreira (yellow card) 40'; Sánchez (yellow card) 45+2', (goal) 51'; Batshuayi (yellow card) 53', (penalty missed) 90+7; Bardakcı 74'	Report 1 Report 2 Report 3	Türüç 36', (yellow card) 56'; Lima (yellow card) 50'; Piątek 54', (yellow card) 77'; Ergün (yellow card) 79' (yellow-red card) 86'; Şengezer (yellow card) 85'; Kemen (yellow card) 100'	Stadium: Rams Park; Attendance: 44,647; Referee: Ali Şansalan; Assistant referees: Mustafa Savranlar, Osman Gökhan Bilir; Fourth official: Batuhan Kolak

6 February 2025 2	Boluspor	1–4	Galatasaray	Bolu
16:00 TRT (UTC+3)	Isgandarli 12', (yellow card) 45'; Oulare (yellow card) 30'; Liço (yellow card) 66'; Erdoğan (yellow card) 81'	Report 1 Report 2 Report 3	Akman (yellow card) 8'; Morata 21'; Aydın 44'; Demir 72'; Kutucu 74'; Baltacı (yellow card) 90+3'	Stadium: Bolu Atatürk Stadium; Referee: Yiğit Arslan; Assistant referees: Deniz Caner Özaral, Egemen Savran; Fourth official: Hasan Kaçar

27 February 2025 3	Galatasaray	0–0	Konyaspor	Sarıyer
19:00 TRT (UTC+3)	Akgün (yellow card) 28'; Demir (yellow card) 60'	Report 1 Report 2 Report 3	Taşçı (yellow card) 14'; Bazoer (yellow card) 90+5'; Kramer (yellow card) 90+6'	Stadium: Rams Park; Attendance: 45,085; Referee: Muhammet Ali Metoğlu; Assistant referees: Hakan Yemişken, Mehmet Salih Mazlum; Fourth official: Ayberk Demirbaş

==== Quarter-finals ====
2 April 2025 Single leg	Fenerbahçe	1–2	Galatasaray	Kadıköy
20:45 TRT (UTC+3)	Szymański 45+1', (yellow card) 90+13'; Söyüncü (yellow card) 46'; Džeko (yellow card) 81'; Kahveci (yellow card) 85'; Škriniar (yellow card) 85'; Yandaş (red card) 90+2'; Fred (red card) End of the match'	Report 1 Report 2 Report 3	Osimhen 10', 27' (pen.), (yellow card) 85'; Sallai (yellow card) 80'; Elmalı (yellow card) 84'; Demirbay (red card) 90+2'; Yılmaz (red card) 90+2'; Frankowski (yellow card) 90+14'	Stadium: Ülker Stadium; Attendance: 45,470; Referee: Cihan Aydın; Assistant referees: Deniz Caner Özaral, Volkan Ahmet Narinç; Fourth official: Burak Bakkal

==== Semi-finals ====
22 April 2025 Single leg	Konyaspor	1–5	Galatasaray	Selçuklu
20:30 TRT (UTC+3)	Pedrinho 53'; Demirbağ (yellow card) 56'; Ertaş (yellow card) 56'	Report 1 Report 2 Report 3	Osimhen 26'; Sánchez (yellow card) 39'; Torreira 42', (yellow card) 68'; Sallai 47', 55'; Demir 90+1'	Stadium: Konya Metropolitan Municipality Stadium; Attendance: 39,316; Referee: Abdullah Buğra Taşkınsoy; Assistant referees: Bersan Duran, Bilal Gölen; Fourth official: Ali Yılmaz

==== Final ====
14 May 2025 Final	Galatasaray	3–0	Trabzonspor	Gaziantep
20:45 TRT (UTC+3)	Yılmaz 5'; Sara (yellow card) 27'; Osimhen 46', 63'; Mertens (yellow card) 79'; Sallai (yellow card) 90+1'	Report 1 Report 2 Report 3	Savić (yellow card) 20'; Lundstram (yellow card) 58'	Stadium: Gaziantep Stadium; Referee: Cihan Aydın; Assistant referees: Hakan Yemişken, Mustafa Savranlar; Fourth official: Ozan Ergün

=== Turkish Super Cup ===
3 August 2024 Final	Galatasaray	0–5	Beşiktaş	Başakşehir
20:45 TRT (UTC+3)	Kutlu (yellow card) 17'; Torreira (yellow card) 20'; Aktürkoğlu (yellow card) 42'; Yılmaz (yellow card) 73'; Nelsson (red card) 87'	Report 1 Report 2 Report 3	Immobile 1', 80' (pen.), (yellow card) 47'; Colley (yellow card) 11'; Kılıçsoy (yellow card) 20'; Svensson 53'; Fernandes (yellow card) 73'; Silva 90'; Hekimoğlu 90+2'	Stadium: Atatürk Olympic Stadium; Attendance: 70,847; Referee: Atilla Karaoğlan; Assistant referees: Abdullah Bora Özkara, Volkan Ahmet Narinç; Fourth official: Mehmet Türkmen

=== UEFA Champions League ===
==== Play-off round ====
The draw for the play-off round was held on 5 August 2024.

21 August 2024 First leg	Young Boys (Switzerland)	3–2	(Turkey) Galatasaray	Bern, Switzerland
22:00 TRT (UTC+3)	Monteiro 3', 45+4'; Hadjam (yellow card) 26'; Lauper (yellow card) 29'; Niasse (yellow card) 43'; Camara (yellow card) 70'; Ugrinić 86' (pen.)	Report 1 Report 2 Report 3	Bardakcı (yellow card) 22' (yellow-red card) 84'; Torreira (yellow card) 45+6'; Batshuayi 66', 72'	Stadium: Stadion Wankdorf; Attendance: 31,500; Referee: Daniel Siebert (Germany); Assistant referees: Jan Seidel (Germany), Rafael Foltyn (Germany); Fourth official: Daniel Schlager (Germany)

27 August 2024 Second leg	Galatasaray (Turkey)	0–1 (2–4 agg.)	(Switzerland) Young Boys	Istanbul, Turkey
22:00 TRT (UTC+3)	Nelsson (yellow card) 38'; Icardi (yellow card) 75'; Ayhan (yellow card) 84'; Muslera (red card) 88'; Mertens (yellow card) 90+6'	Report 1 Report 2 Report 3	Ganvoula (yellow card) 33'; Maleš (yellow card) 84'; Virginius 87' (yellow card) 89'; Husić (yellow card) 89'	Stadium: Rams Park; Attendance: 46,827; Referee: Espen Eskås (Norway); Assistant referees: Jan Erik Engan (Norway), Isaak Elias Bashevkin (Norway); Fourth official: Mohammad Usman Aslam (Norway)

=== UEFA Europa League ===
==== League phase ====
The draw for the league phase was held on 30 August 2024.

Pos	Team	Pld	W	D	L	GF	GA	GD	Pts	Qualification
12	(Royal Dutch Football Association) Ajax	8	4	1	3	16	8	+8	13	Advance to knockout phase play-offs (seeded)
13	(Royal Spanish Football Federation) Real Sociedad	8	4	1	3	13	9	+4	13	Advance to knockout phase play-offs (seeded)
14	(Turkish Football Federation) Galatasaray	8	3	4	1	19	16	+3	13	Advance to knockout phase play-offs (seeded)
15	(Italian Football Federation) Roma	8	3	3	2	10	6	+4	12	Advance to knockout phase play-offs (seeded)
16	(Football Association of the Czech Republic) Viktoria Plzeň	8	3	3	2	13	12	+1	12	Advance to knockout phase play-offs (seeded)

Source: UEFA
Rules for classification: League phase tiebreakers

Overall								Home						Away					
Pld	W	D	L	GF	GA	GD	Pts	W	D	L	GF	GA	GD	W	D	L	GF	GA	GD
8	3	4	1	19	16	+3	13	3	1	0	13	9	+4	0	3	1	6	7	−1

Last updated: 29 January 2025.
Source: UEFA

Round	1	2	3	4	5	6	7	8
Ground	H	A	H	H	A	A	H	A
Result	W	D	W	W	D	D	D	L
Position	5	8	5	3	4	6	9	14

Source: UEFA
A = Away; H = Home; W = Win; D = Draw; L = Loss

Win Draw Loss Postponed

25 September 2024 1	Galatasaray (Turkey)	3–1	(Greece) PAOK	Istanbul, Turkey
22:00 TRT (UTC+3)	Rahman 48' (o.g.); Ayhan (yellow card) 56'; Akgün 75'; Icardi 90+5'	Report 1 Report 2 Report 3	Ozdoyev (yellow card) 28'; Lucescu (yellow card) 28'; Konstantelias 67'	Stadium: Rams Park; Attendance: 50,700; Referee: Alejandro Hernández Hernández (Spain); Assistant referees: José Naranjo (Spain), Diego Sánchez Rojo (Spain); Fourth official: José Luis Munuera (Spain)

3 October 2024 2	RFS (Latvia)	2–2	(Turkey) Galatasaray	Riga, Latvia
18:45 CEST (UTC+2)	Panić (yellow card) 31'; Ikaunieks 40' (yellow card) 83'; Odisharia 55'	Report 1 Report 2 Report 3	Mertens 12'; Akgün (yellow card) 18' (goal) 38'; Demirbay (yellow card) 85'	Stadium: Daugava Stadium; Attendance: 8,502; Referee: Filip Glova (Slovakia); Assistant referees: Daniel Polacek (Slovakia), Peter Bednar (Slovakia); Fourth official: Lukáš Dzivjak (Slovakia)
Note: RFS will play their home matches at Daugava Stadium, Riga, instead of their regular stadium, LNK Sporta Parks, Riga, which did not meet UEFA requirements.

23 October 2024 3	Galatasaray (Turkey)	4–3	(Sweden) IF Elfsborg	Istanbul, Turkey
17:30 CET (UTC+3)	Icardi 28'; Pettersson 39' (o.g.); Yılmaz 44'; Akgün 83'	Report 1 Report 2 Report 3	Yegbe (yellow card) 38'; Hult 52' (yellow card) 79'; Baidoo 65' (pen.); Larsson 90+2'	Stadium: Rams Park; Attendance: 36,938; Referee: Matej Jug (Slovenia); Assistant referees: Matej Žunič (Slovenia), Manuel Vidali (Slovenia); Fourth official: Mihael Antic (Slovenia)

7 November 2024 4	Galatasaray (Turkey)	3–2	(England) Tottenham Hotspur	Istanbul, Turkey
20:45 TRT (UTC+3)	Akgün 6'; Mertens (yellow card) 16'; Osimhen 31', 39'; Sara (yellow card) 54'; Torreira (yellow card) 90+6'	Report 1 Report 2 Report 3	Lankshear 18', (yellow card) 53' (yellow-red card) 60'; Drăgușin (yellow card) 32'; Kulusevski (yellow card) 48'; Bissouma (yellow card) 60'; Solanke 69'; Bentancur (yellow card) 90+4'	Stadium: Rams Park; Attendance: 51,739; Referee: Lawrence Visser (Belgium); Assistant referees: Rien Vanyzere (Belgium), Thibaud Nijssen (Belgium); Fourth official: Simon Bourdeaud'hui (Belgium)

28 November 2024 5	AZ (Netherlands)	1–1	(Turkey) Galatasaray	Alkmaar, Netherlands
18:45 CET	Mijnans 2'; van Bommel (yellow card) 6'; Parrott (yellow card) 73'; Smit (yellow card) 88' (yellow-red card) 90+2'	Report 1 Report 2 Report 3	Osimhen 43', (yellow card) 88'; Mertens (yellow card) 84'; Sánchez (yellow card) 89'; Akgün (yellow card) 90+4'	Stadium: AFAS Stadion; Attendance: 16,229; Referee: Horațiu Feșnic (Romania); Assistant referees: Valentin Avram (Romania), Alexandru Cerei (Romania); Fourth official: Szabolcs Kovacs (Romania)

12 December 2024 6	Malmö FF (Sweden)	2–2	(Turkey) Galatasaray	Malmö, Sweden
18:45 CET	Botheim 24'; Bolin (yellow card) 32'; Rieks (yellow card) 39'; Peña 90+2'	Report 1 Report 2 Report 3	Jelert 43'; Torreira (yellow card) 53'; Akgün 56'; Baltacı (yellow card) 90+4'	Stadium: Eleda Stadion; Attendance: 19,489; Referee: John Brooks (England); Assistant referees: Simon Bennett (England), Daniel Robathan (England); Fourth official: Darren Bond (England)

21 January 2025 7	Galatasaray (Turkey)	3–3	(Ukraine) Dynamo Kyiv	Istanbul, Turkey
18:30 TRT (UTC+3)	Sánchez 6', (yellow card) 80'; Bardakcı 21'; Yılmaz (yellow card) 33'; Jakobs (yellow card) 40'; Osimhen 53' (pen.), (yellow card) 84'	Report 1 Report 2 Report 3	Shaparenko (yellow card) 40'; Vanat 44'; Tymchyk (yellow card) 52'; Yarmolenko 68', 81'; Pikhalyonok (yellow card) 72'; Mykhaylenko (yellow card) 74'; Vivcharenko (yellow card) 84'	Stadium: Rams Park; Attendance: 45,273; Referee: Kristo Tohver (Estonia); Assistant referees: Silver Koiv (Estonia), Sander Saga (Estonia); Fourth official: Kevin Kaivoja (Estonia)

30 January 2025 8	Ajax (Netherlands)	2–1	(Turkey) Galatasaray	Amsterdam, Netherlands
21:00 CET	Traoré 23', (yellow card) 72'; Fitz-Jim 58'	Report 1 Report 2 Report 3	Osimhen (yellow card) 38', (goal) 90+4'; Torreira (yellow card) 53'; Sánchez (yellow card) 79'	Stadium: Johan Cruyff Arena; Attendance: 54,100; Referee: Jesús Gil Manzano (Spain); Assistant referees: Diego Barbero (Spain), Ángel Nevado (Spain); Fourth official: Guillermo Cuadra (Spain)

==== Knockout phase ====
===== Play-offs =====
The draw for the knockout phase play-offs has been held on 31 January 2025.

13 February 2025 First leg	AZ (Netherlands)	4–1	(Turkey) Galatasaray	Alkmaar, Netherlands
23:00 TRT (UTC+3)	Mijnans 12'; Parrott 37' (pen.); Wolfe (yellow card) 49', (goal) 66'; Clasie 57', (yellow card) 76'	Report 1 Report 2 Report 3	Ayhan (yellow card) 11' (yellow-red card) 51'; Sallai 20'; Bardakcı (yellow card) 43'; Morata (yellow card) 59'	Stadium: AFAS Stadion; Attendance: 14,092; Referee: João Pinheiro (Portugal); Assistant referees: Bruno Jesus (Portugal), Luciano Maia (Portugal); Fourth official: João Gonçalves (Portugal)

20 February 2025 Second leg	Galatasaray (Turkey)	2–2 (3–6 agg.)	(Netherlands) AZ	Istanbul, Turkey
20:45 TRT (UTC+3)	Osimhen 56'; Jelert (yellow card) 65'; Sallai 70'	Report 1 Report 2 Report 3	Maikuma 42'; Kasius 55'	Stadium: Rams Park; Attendance: 37,343; Referee: Anthony Taylor (England); Assistant referees: Gary Beswick (England), Ian Hussin (England); Fourth official: Sam Barrott (England)

== Statistics ==
=== Appearances and goals ===
Includes all competitions for senior teams.

No.	Pos	Nat	Player	Total		Süper Lig		Turkish Cup		Turkish Super Cup		Champions League		Europa League	
No.	Pos	Nat	Player	Apps	Goals	Apps	Goals	Apps	Goals	Apps	Goals	Apps	Goals	Apps	Goals
Goalkeepers
1	GK	(Uruguay) URU	Fernando Muslera	43	1	34	1	0	0	1	0	2	0	6	0
19	GK	(Turkey) TUR	Günay Güvenç	15	0	3	0	6	0	0	0	2	0	4	0
38	GK	(Turkey) TUR	Atakan Nuri Ordu	0	0	0	0	0	0	0	0	0	0	0	0
Defenders
4	DF	(Senegal) SEN	Ismail Jakobs	23	0	17	0	3	0	0	0	0	0	3	0
6	DF	(Colombia) COL	Davinson Sánchez	44	5	31	3	4	1	0	0	0	0	9	1
17	DF	(Turkey) TUR	Eren Elmalı	16	0	13	0	3	0	0	0	0	0	0	0
23	DF	(Turkey) TUR	Kaan Ayhan	43	1	30	1	4	0	1	0	1	0	7	0
24	DF	(Denmark) DEN	Elias Jelert	34	1	20	0	3	0	0	0	2	0	9	1
26	DF	(Colombia) COL	Carlos Cuesta	9	0	5	0	2	0	0	0	0	0	2	0
42	DF	(Turkey) TUR	Abdülkerim Bardakcı	49	5	32	3	5	1	1	0	1	0	10	1
65	DF	(Turkey) TUR	Kadir Subaşı	1	0	0	0	1	0	0	0	0	0	0	0
90	DF	(Turkey) TUR	Metehan Baltacı	18	0	10	0	4	0	0	0	0	0	4	0
91	DF	(Turkey) TUR	Arda Ünyay	1	0	1	0	0	0	0	0	0	0	0	0
Midfielders
5	MF	(Germany) GER	Eyüp Aydın	4	1	2	0	2	1	0	0	0	0	0	0
7	MF	(Hungary) HUN	Roland Sallai	33	6	27	2	4	2	0	0	0	0	2	2
8	MF	(Germany) GER	Kerem Demirbay	34	0	20	0	3	0	1	0	1	0	9	0
11	MF	(Turkey) TUR	Yunus Akgün	44	12	30	7	5	0	1	0	0	0	8	5
18	MF	(Turkey) TUR	Berkan Kutlu	42	0	25	0	4	0	1	0	2	0	10	0
20	MF	(Brazil) BRA	Gabriel Sara	45	2	31	2	3	0	0	0	2	0	9	0
29	MF	(Poland) POL	Przemysław Frankowski	15	0	12	0	3	0	0	0	0	0	0	0
30	MF	(Austria) AUT	Yusuf Demir	17	2	8	0	4	2	0	0	0	0	5	0
33	MF	(Turkey) TUR	Gökdeniz Gürpüz	1	0	0	0	1	0	0	0	0	0	0	0
34	MF	(Uruguay) URU	Lucas Torreira	48	6	32	5	4	1	1	0	2	0	9	0
53	MF	(Turkey) TUR	Barış Alper Yılmaz	48	14	32	12	4	1	1	0	2	0	9	1
67	MF	(Turkey) TUR	Berat Luş	4	0	1	0	1	0	0	0	0	0	2	0
83	MF	(Turkey) TUR	Efe Akman	9	0	4	0	2	0	0	0	0	0	3	0
99	MF	(Gabon) GAB	Mario Lemina	16	1	12	1	4	0	0	0	0	0	0	0
Forwards
9	FW	(Argentina) ARG	Mauro Icardi	14	6	7	4	0	0	1	0	2	0	4	2
10	FW	(Belgium) BEL	Dries Mertens	52	6	34	5	5	0	1	0	2	0	10	1
21	FW	(Turkey) TUR	Ahmed Kutucu	18	2	14	1	4	1	0	0	0	0	0	0
45	FW	(Nigeria) NGR	Victor Osimhen	41	37	30	26	4	5	0	0	0	0	7	6
77	FW	(Spain) ESP	Álvaro Morata	16	7	12	6	3	1	0	0	0	0	1	0
Players transferred/loaned out during the season
–	MF	(Romania) ROU	Alexandru Cicâldău	0	0	0	0	0	0	0	0	0	0	0	0
4	DF	(Denmark) DEN	Mathias Ross	0	0	0	0	0	0	0	0	0	0	0	0
7	MF	(Turkey) TUR	Kerem Aktürkoğlu	5	2	2	2	0	0	1	0	2	0	0	0
12	GK	(Turkey) TUR	Batuhan Şen	0	0	0	0	0	0	0	0	0	0	0	0
14	MF	(Ivory Coast) CIV	Wilfried Zaha	1	0	0	0	0	0	1	0	0	0	0	0
15	DF	(France) FRA	Léo Dubois	3	0	2	0	0	0	0	0	1	0	0	0
17	DF	(Germany) GER	Derrick Köhn	4	0	1	0	0	0	1	0	2	0	0	0
21	FW	(Turkey) TUR	Halil Dervişoğlu	0	0	0	0	0	0	0	0	0	0	0	0
22	MF	(Morocco) MAR	Hakim Ziyech	11	0	5	0	0	0	1	0	2	0	3	0
25	DF	(Denmark) DEN	Victor Nelsson	18	0	11	0	0	0	1	0	2	0	4	0
27	MF	(Portugal) POR	Sérgio Oliveira	0	0	0	0	0	0	0	0	0	0	0	0
44	FW	(Belgium) BEL	Michy Batshuayi	29	7	17	5	1	0	1	0	2	2	8	0
47	MF	(Turkey) TUR	İlhami Siraçhan Nas	0	0	0	0	0	0	0	0	0	0	0	0
48	MF	(Turkey) TUR	Taylan Antalyalı	0	0	0	0	0	0	0	0	0	0	0	0
58	DF	(Turkey) TUR	Ali Yeşilyurt	0	0	0	0	0	0	0	0	0	0	0	0
63	MF	(Turkey) TUR	Baran Aksaka	0	0	0	0	0	0	0	0	0	0	0	0
72	DF	(Turkey) TUR	Ali Turap Bülbül	0	0	0	0	0	0	0	0	0	0	0	0
88	DF	(Turkey) TUR	Kazımcan Karataş	0	0	0	0	0	0	0	0	0	0	0	0

Source: FBref.com, Mackolik.com

=== Goalscorers ===
Includes all competitions for senior teams. The list is sorted by squad number when season-total goals are equal. Players with no goals not included in the list.

Rank	No.	Pos	Nat	Name	Süper Lig	Turkish Cup	Turkish Super Cup	Champions League	Europa League	Total
1	45	FW	(Nigeria)	Victor Osimhen	26	5	0	0	6	37
2	53	MF	(Turkey)	Barış Alper Yılmaz	12	1	0	0	1	14
3	11	MF	(Turkey)	Yunus Akgün	7	0	0	0	5	12
4	44	FW	(Belgium)	Michy Batshuayi	5	0	0	2	0	7
4	77	FW	(Spain)	Álvaro Morata	6	1	0	0	0	7
5	7	MF	(Hungary)	Roland Sallai	2	2	0	0	2	6
5	9	FW	(Argentina)	Mauro Icardi	4	0	0	0	2	6
5	10	FW	(Belgium)	Dries Mertens	5	0	0	0	1	6
5	34	MF	(Uruguay)	Lucas Torreira	5	1	0	0	0	6
6	6	DF	(Colombia)	Davinson Sánchez	3	1	0	0	1	5
6	42	DF	(Turkey)	Abdülkerim Bardakcı	3	1	0	0	1	5
7	7	MF	(Turkey)	Kerem Aktürkoğlu	2	0	0	0	0	2
7	20	MF	(Brazil)	Gabriel Sara	2	0	0	0	0	2
7	21	FW	(Turkey)	Ahmed Kutucu	1	1	0	0	0	2
7	30	MF	(Austria)	Yusuf Demir	0	2	0	0	0	2
8	1	MF	(Uruguay)	Fernando Muslera	1	0	0	0	0	1
8	5	MF	(Germany)	Eyüp Aydın	0	1	0	0	0	1
8	23	DF	(Turkey)	Kaan Ayhan	1	0	0	0	0	1
8	24	DF	(Denmark)	Elias Jelert	0	0	0	0	1	1
8	99	MF	(Gabon)	Mario Lemina	1	0	0	0	0	1
Own goals					3	0	0	0	2	5
Awarded					2	0	0	0	0	2
Totals					91	16	0	2	22	131

Source: FBref.com, Mackolik.com

=== Hat-tricks ===
Player	Against	Result	Date	Competition	Ref
(Nigeria) Victor Osimhen	Antalyaspor	4–0 (H)	14 March 2025	Süper Lig	

(H) – Home; (A) – Away

=== Clean sheets ===
Includes all competitions for senior teams. The list is sorted by squad number when season-total clean sheets are equal. Numbers in parentheses represent games where both goalkeepers participated and both kept a clean sheet; the number in parentheses is awarded to the goalkeeper who was substituted on, whilst a full clean sheet is awarded to the goalkeeper who was on the field at the start of play. Goalkeepers with no clean sheets not included in the list.

Rank	No.	Pos	Nat	Name	Süper Lig	Turkish Cup	Turkish Super Cup	Champions League	Europa League	Total
1	1	GK	(Uruguay)	Fernando Muslera	13	0	0	0	0	13
2	19	GK	(Turkey)	Günay Güvenç	2	2	0	0	0	4
Totals					15	2	0	0	0	17

Source: FBref.com, Mackolik.com

=== Disciplinary record ===
Includes all competitions for senior teams. The list is sorted by red cards, then yellow cards (and by squad number when total cards are equal). Players with no cards not included in the list.

No.	Pos	Nat	Name	Süper Lig			Turkish Cup			Turkish Super Cup			Champions League			Europa League			Total		
No.	Pos	Nat	Name	Yellow card	(yellow card) (yellow-red card)	Red card	Yellow card	(yellow card) (yellow-red card)	Red card	Yellow card	(yellow card) (yellow-red card)	Red card	Yellow card	(yellow card) (yellow-red card)	Red card	Yellow card	(yellow card) (yellow-red card)	Red card	Yellow card	(yellow card) (yellow-red card)	Red card
1	GK	(Uruguay)	Fernando Muslera	8	0	0	0	0	0	0	0	0	0	0	1	0	0	0	8	0	1
4	DF	(Senegal)	Ismail Jakobs	2	0	0	0	0	0	0	0	0	0	0	0	1	0	0	2	0	0
6	DF	(Colombia)	Davinson Sánchez	7	0	0	2	0	0	0	0	0	0	0	0	3	0	0	12	0	0
7	MF	(Turkey)	Kerem Aktürkoğlu	0	0	0	0	0	0	1	0	0	0	0	0	0	0	0	1	0	0
7	MF	(Hungary)	Roland Sallai	10	0	0	2	0	0	0	0	0	0	0	0	0	0	0	12	0	0
8	MF	(Germany)	Kerem Demirbay	2	0	0	0	0	1	0	0	0	0	0	0	1	0	0	3	0	1
9	FW	(Argentina)	Mauro Icardi	0	0	0	0	0	0	0	0	0	1	0	0	0	0	0	1	0	0
10	FW	(Belgium)	Dries Mertens	3	0	0	1	0	0	0	0	0	1	0	0	2	0	0	7	0	0
11	MF	(Turkey)	Yunus Akgün	4	0	0	1	0	0	0	0	0	0	0	0	2	0	0	7	0	0
17	DF	(Turkey)	Eren Elmalı	2	0	0	1	0	0	0	0	0	0	0	0	0	0	0	3	0	0
18	MF	(Turkey)	Berkan Kutlu	1	0	0	0	0	0	1	0	0	0	0	0	0	0	0	2	0	0
19	GK	(Turkey)	Günay Güvenç	0	0	1	0	0	0	0	0	0	0	0	0	0	0	0	0	0	1
20	MF	(Brazil)	Gabriel Sara	4	0	0	1	0	0	0	0	0	0	0	0	1	0	0	6	0	0
21	FW	(Turkey)	Ahmed Kutucu	3	0	0	0	0	0	0	0	0	0	0	0	0	0	0	3	0	0
22	MF	(Morocco)	Hakim Ziyech	1	0	0	0	0	0	0	0	0	0	0	0	0	0	0	1	0	0
23	DF	(Turkey)	Kaan Ayhan	6	0	0	0	0	0	0	0	0	1	0	0	1	1	0	8	1	0
24	DF	(Denmark)	Elias Jelert	1	0	0	0	0	0	0	0	0	0	0	0	1	0	0	2	0	0
25	DF	(Denmark)	Victor Nelsson	0	0	0	0	0	0	0	0	1	1	0	0	0	0	0	1	0	1
26	DF	(Colombia)	Carlos Cuesta	2	0	0	0	0	0	0	0	0	0	0	0	0	0	0	2	0	0
29	MF	(Poland)	Przemysław Frankowski	2	0	1	1	0	0	0	0	0	0	0	0	0	0	0	3	0	1
30	MF	(Austria)	Yusuf Demir	0	0	0	1	0	0	0	0	0	0	0	0	0	0	0	1	0	0
34	MF	(Uruguay)	Lucas Torreira	4	0	0	2	0	0	1	0	0	1	0	0	3	0	0	11	0	0
42	DF	(Turkey)	Abdülkerim Bardakcı	4	0	0	0	0	0	0	0	0	0	1	0	1	0	0	5	1	0
44	FW	(Belgium)	Michy Batshuayi	1	0	0	1	0	0	0	0	0	0	0	0	0	0	0	2	0	0
45	FW	(Nigeria)	Victor Osimhen	4	0	0	1	0	0	0	0	0	0	0	0	3	0	0	8	0	0
53	MF	(Turkey)	Barış Alper Yılmaz	9	0	0	0	0	1	1	0	0	0	0	0	1	0	0	11	0	1
77	FW	(Spain)	Álvaro Morata	2	0	0	0	0	0	0	0	0	0	0	0	1	0	0	3	0	0
83	MF	(Turkey)	Efe Akman	0	0	0	1	0	0	0	0	0	0	0	0	0	0	0	1	0	0
90	DF	(Turkey)	Metehan Baltacı	0	0	1	1	0	0	0	0	0	0	0	0	1	0	0	2	0	1
99	MF	(Gabon)	Mario Lemina	2	0	0	0	0	0	0	0	0	0	0	0	0	0	0	2	0	0
Totals				84	0	3	16	0	2	4	0	1	5	1	1	22	1	0	130	2	7

Source: FBref.com, Mackolik.com

=== Game as captain ===
Includes all competitions for senior teams. The list is sorted by squad number when season-total number of games where a player started as captain are equal. Players with no games started as captain not included in the list.

Rank	No.	Pos	Nat	Name	Süper Lig	Turkish Cup	Turkish Super Cup	Champions League	Europa League	Total
1	1	GK	(Uruguay)	Fernando Muslera	34	0	1	2	6	43
2	42	DF	(Turkey)	Abdülkerim Bardakcı	0	3	0	0	1	4
3	23	DF	(Turkey)	Kaan Ayhan	1	1	0	0	1	3
4	9	FW	(Argentina)	Mauro Icardi	0	0	0	0	2	2
4	18	MF	(Turkey)	Berkan Kutlu	0	2	0	0	0	2
5	10	FW	(Belgium)	Dries Mertens	1	0	0	0	0	1
Totals					36	6	1	2	10	55

Source: FBref.com, Mackolik.com

== Injury record ==
N	P	Nat.	Name	Type	Status	Source	Match	Inj. Date	Ret. Date
24	DF	(Denmark)	Elias Jelert	Fitness		hurriyet.com.tr	in training	30 July 2024	10 August 2024
6	DF	(Colombia)	Davinson Sánchez	Hamstring strain		Galatasaray.org	vs Hatayspor	9 August 2024	5 September 2024
9	FW	(Argentina)	Mauro Icardi	Torn thigh muscle		Galatasaray.org	vs Adana Demirspor	31 August 2024	20 September 2024
22	MF	(Morocco)	Hakim Ziyech	Partial muscle tear		Galatasaray.org	vs Lesotho	6 September 2024	29 September 2024
45	FW	(Nigeria)	Victor Osimhen	Muscle strain		Galatasaray.org	vs Kasımpaşa	28 September 2024	18 October 2024
53	MF	(Turkey)	Barış Alper Yılmaz	Hamstring strain		TFF.org	vs Montenegro	12 October 2024	17 October 2024
4	DF	(Senegal)	Ismail Jakobs	Muscle strain		Galatasaray.org	vs Antalyaspor	19 October 2024	8 November 2024
9	FW	(Argentina)	Mauro Icardi	Completely torn ACL; Meniscus tear PLC injury		Galatasaray.org; Galatasaray.org	vs Tottenham Hotspur	7 November 2024	18 July 2025
4	DF	(Senegal)	Ismail Jakobs	Muscle strain		Galatasaray.org	vs Samsunspor	10 November 2024	14 December 2024
23	DF	(Turkey)	Kaan Ayhan	Hamstring strain		Galatasaray.org	vs Bodrum	23 November 2024	14 December 2024
30	MF	(Austria)	Yusuf Demir	Bruise		ajansspor.com	in training	26 November 2024	14 December 2024
42	DF	(Turkey)	Abdülkerim Bardakcı	Ankle bone edema and ligament strain		Galatasaray.org	vs Eyüpspor	1 December 2024	10 December 2024
53	MF	(Turkey)	Barış Alper Yılmaz	Knee injury		Galatasaray.org	vs Sivasspor	8 December 2024	16 December 2024
45	FW	(Nigeria)	Victor Osimhen	Muscle injury		Galatasaray.org	vs Sivasspor	8 December 2024	15 December 2024
20	MF	(Brazil)	Gabriel Sara	Inner ligament stretch of the knee		Galatasaray.org	vs Başakşehir FK	8 January 2025	24 January 2025
4	DF	(Senegal)	Ismail Jakobs	Achilles tendon injury		Galatasaray.org	vs Konyaspor	25 January 2025	25 March 2025
8	MF	(Germany)	Kerem Demirbay	Groin injury		mackolik.com	in training	26 January 2025	7 February 2025
11	MF	(Turkey)	Yunus Akgün	Knee injury		Galatasaray.org	vs Ajax	30 January 2025	22 February 2025
77	FW	(Spain)	Álvaro Morata	Hamstring strain		Galatasaray.org	vs AZ	13 February 2025	3 March 2025
24	DF	(Denmark)	Elias Jelert	Unknown		Galatasaray.org	in training	28 March 2025	24 April 2025
23	DF	(Turkey)	Kaan Ayhan	Knee injury		Galatasaray.org	in training	10 April 2025	23 April 2025
77	FW	(Spain)	Álvaro Morata	Groin injury		Galatasaray.org	in training	20 April 2025	24 April 2025
11	MF	(Turkey)	Yunus Akgün	Meniscus tear		Galatasaray.org	in training	18 May 2025	11 June 2025
42	DF	(Turkey)	Abdülkerim Bardakcı	Hamstring strain		Galatasaray.org	in training	18 May 2025	11 June 2025

- Player is injured
- Player has recovered from injury
Last updated: 18 July 2025
Source: Galatasaray Sports Club

== Attendances ==
As of May 30, 2025

Competition	Total	Games	Average
Süper Lig	801,449	18	44,525
Turkish Cup	89,732	2	44,866
Champions League	46,827	1	46,827
Europa League	221,993	5	44,399
Total	1,160,001	26	44,615
