= 2024–25 Konyaspor season =

Konyaspor
2024–25 season
- Stadium: Konya Metropolitan Municipality Stadium
- Süper Lig: Pre-season
- Turkish Cup: Pre-season
- Average home league attendance: 12,700
| Home colours | Away colours |

The 2024–25 season is the 103rd season in the history of Konyaspor, and the club's 12th consecutive season in Süper Lig. In addition to the domestic league, the team is scheduled to participate in the Turkish Cup.

== Transfers ==
=== In ===
| Pos. | Player | Transferred from | Fee | Date | Source |
|---|---|---|---|---|---|
| MF | (Turkey) Melih İbrahimoğlu | (Albania) KF Egnatia | Undisclosed | 19 July 2024 | |
| FW | (Turkey) Umut Nayir | (Turkey) Fenerbahçe | €400,000 | 26 July 2024 | |
| FW | (Turkey) Melih Bostan | (Turkey) Fenerbahçe | Undisclosed | 26 July 2024 | |
| MF | (Serbia) Danijel Aleksić | (Turkey) Başakşehir | Free | 7 August 2024 | |

== Friendlies ==
=== Pre-season ===
| 18 July 2024 Friendly | Konyaspor (Turkey) | 3–2 | (Netherlands) Almere City FC | Kayseri |
| 17:00 UTC+3 | Moreno 16'; Demirbağ 67'; Sambou 81' | | Dors 75'; Akujobi 87' |
Note: Behind closed doors

| 24 July 2024 Friendly | Gorica (Croatia) | 1–1 | (Turkey) Konyaspor | Radomlje, Slovenia |
| 18:30 UTC+2 | Štiglec 80' | | Cikalleshi 70' | Stadium: Športni park Radomlje |

| 28 July 2024 Friendly | Udinese (Italy) | 1–0 | (Turkey) Konyaspor | St. Michael im Lungau, Austria |
| 16:00 UTC+2 | Lovrić 47' | | | Stadium: Sportplatz St. Michael |

| 30 July 2024 Friendly | Brinje Grosuplje (Slovenia) | 1–1 | (Turkey) Konyaspor | Kranjska Gora, Slovenia |
| 17:00 UTC+2 | 70' | | 90' |

| 2 August 2024 Friendly | Konyaspor (Turkey) | 1–0 | (Saudi Arabia) Al-Fayha | Slovenia |
| 16:20 UTC+2 | Louka Prip 49' |

== Competitions ==
=== Overall record ===
| Competition | First match | Last match | Starting round | Record | | | | | | | |
| Competition | First match | Last match | Starting round | Pld | W | D | L | GF | GA | GD | Win % |
|---|---|---|---|---|---|---|---|---|---|---|---|
| Süper Lig | 9–12 August 2024 | | Matchday 1 | 0 | 0 | 0 | 0 | 0 | 0 | +0 | — |
| Turkish Cup | | | | 0 | 0 | 0 | 0 | 0 | 0 | +0 | — |
| Total | | | | 0 | 0 | 0 | 0 | 0 | 0 | +0 | — |

Source: Competitions

=== Süper Lig ===
==== League table ====
| Pos | Team | Pld | W | D | L | GF | GA | GD | Pts |
|---|---|---|---|---|---|---|---|---|---|
| 9 | Rizespor | 36 | 15 | 4 | 17 | 52 | 58 | −6 | 49 |
| 10 | Kasımpaşa | 36 | 11 | 14 | 11 | 62 | 63 | −1 | 47 |
| 11 | Konyaspor | 36 | 13 | 7 | 16 | 45 | 50 | −5 | 46 |
| 12 | Gaziantep | 36 | 12 | 9 | 15 | 45 | 50 | −5 | 45 |
| 13 | Alanyaspor | 36 | 12 | 9 | 15 | 43 | 50 | −7 | 45 |

Source: Süper Lig
Rules for classification: 1) Points; 2) Head-to-head points; 3) Head-to-head goal difference; 4) Head-to-head goals scored; 5) Goal difference; 6) Goals scored; 7) Play-off.
(Note: Head-to-head record is used only after all the matches between the teams in question have been played)

==== Results summary ====
| Overall | | | | | | | | Home | | | | | | Away | | | | | |
| Pld | W | D | L | GF | GA | GD | Pts | W | D | L | GF | GA | GD | W | D | L | GF | GA | GD |
|---|---|---|---|---|---|---|---|---|---|---|---|---|---|---|---|---|---|---|---|
| 36 | 13 | 7 | 16 | 45 | 50 | −5 | 46 | 9 | 5 | 4 | 26 | 19 | +7 | 4 | 2 | 12 | 19 | 31 | −12 |

Source: Süper Lig

==== Results by round ====
| Round | 1 | 2 | 3 | 4 | 5 | 6 | 7 | 8 | 9 | 10 | 11 | 12 | 13 | 14 | 15 | 16 | 17 | 18 | 19 | 20 | 21 | 22 | 23 | 24 | 25 | 26 | 27 | 28 | 29 | 30 | 31 | 32 | 33 | 34 | 35 | 36 | 37 | 38 |
|---|---|---|---|---|---|---|---|---|---|---|---|---|---|---|---|---|---|---|---|---|---|---|---|---|---|---|---|---|---|---|---|---|---|---|---|---|---|---|
| Ground | A | H | A | H | A | H | A | H | A | A | H | A | H | A | H | A | B | A | H | H | A | H | A | H | A | H | A | H | H | A | H | A | H | A | H | B | H | A |
| Result | W | L | L | D | W | D | L | W | L | L | W | L | D | W | D | D | B | L | L | D | L | W | L | L | D | W | L | W | W | L | W | W | W | L | W | B | L | L |
| Position | 2 | 8 | 11 | 9 | 7 | 8 | 11 | 8 | 11 | 11 | 10 | 10 | 13 | 10 | 8 | 9 | 11 | 13 | 14 | 13 | 15 | 14 | 14 | 14 | 14 | 14 | 14 | 13 | 12 | 12 | 12 | 11 | 9 | 10 | 10 | 10 | 10 | 11 |

Source: TFF.org
A = Away; H = Home; B = Bye; W = Win; D = Draw; L = Loss

==== Matches ====
The match schedule was released on 31 May 2025.

| 10 August 2024 1 | Kasımpaşa | 2–3 | Konyaspor | Istanbul |
| 19:15 EEST | Omeruo (yellow card) 6'; Hajradinović (yellow card) 45+2'; Nuno da Costa 48'; Cláudio Winck 74' (yellow card) 80'; Ben Ouanes (yellow card) 85'; Çiftpınar (yellow card) 90+6' | Report | Pedrinho 7' (yellow card) 72'; Damjanović (yellow card) 43'; Aleksić (yellow card) 67' (goal) 81'; Nayir 89' | Stadium: Recep Tayyip Erdoğan Stadium; Attendance: 1,635; Referee: (Turkey) Muhammet Metoğlu |

| 16 August 2024 2 | Konyaspor | 1–2 | Galatasaray | Konya |
| 21:00 EEST | Ülgün 45'; Nayir (yellow card) 80' | Report | Aktürkoğlu 41'; Yılmaz 59'; Demirbay (yellow card) 70' | Stadium: Konya Metropolitan Municipality Stadium; Attendance: 28,290; Referee: (Turkey) Direnç Tonusluoğlu |

| 24 August 2024 3 | Bodrum | 3–1 | Konyaspor | Bodrum |
| 21:45 EEST | Demirbağ 28' (o.g.); Pușcaș 40'; Samet Yalçın (yellow card) 43'; Özer 88' (pen.) (yellow card) 90+1' | Report | Pedrinho 45+4'; Jevtović (yellow card) 47'; Słowik (yellow card) 90+1' | Stadium: Grey Beton Bodrum Stadyumu; Attendance: 2,759; Referee: (Turkey) Çağdaş Altay |

| 31 August 2024 4 | Konyaspor | 0–0 | Kayserispor | Konya |
| 19:15 EEST | Boateng (yellow card) 87' | Report | Miguel Cardoso (yellow card) 66' | Stadium: Konya Metropolitan Municipality Stadium; Attendance: 12,956; Referee: (Turkey) Emre Kargın |

| 14 September 2024 5 | Samsunspor | 0–1 | Konyaspor | Samsun |
| 17:00 EEST | | Report | Pedrinho 30'; Boranijašević (yellow card) 87'; Ülgün (yellow card) 90+7' | Stadium: Samsun 19 Mayıs Stadium; Attendance: 11,322; Referee: (Turkey) Oğuzhan Çakır |

| 21 September 2024 6 | Konyaspor | 0–0 | Sivasspor | Konya |
| 17:00 EEST | Nayir (yellow card) 36'; Ülgün (yellow card) 48'; Boranijašević (yellow card) 60'; Erdoğan (yellow card) 88'; İbrahimoğlu (yellow card) 90+5' | Report | Pritchard (yellow card) 32'; Moutoussamy (yellow card) 84'; Paluli (yellow card) 88'; Biegański (yellow card) 90' | Stadium: Konya Metropolitan Municipality Stadium; Attendance: 12,281; Referee: (Turkey) Yasin Kol |

| 29 September 2024 7 | Trabzonspor | 3–2 | Konyaspor | Trabzon |
| 16:00 EEST | Višća 16' (yellow card) 64'; Banza 45+4' (pen.) 54'; Denswil (yellow card) 76'; Pedro Malheiro (yellow card) 86'; Saatçı (yellow card) 90+8' | Report | Demirbağ 24' (yellow card) 90+8'; Keyta 89' | Stadium: Papara Park; Attendance: 17,427; Referee: (Turkey) Halil Umut Meler |

| 6 October 2024 8 | Konyaspor | 2–1 | Eyüpspor | Konya |
| 13:30 EEST | İbrahimoğlu (yellow card) 6'; Boranijašević (yellow card) 45+3'; Kramer (yellow card) 58'; Erdoğan 72'; Bazoer (yellow card) 78'; Aleksić 90+7' (yellow card) 90+8' | Report | Samuel Sáiz (yellow card) 33'; Midtsjø (yellow card) 45+4'; Kutucu 65' | Stadium: Konya Metropolitan Municipality Stadium; Attendance: 13,385; Referee: (Turkey) Erkan Özdamar |

| 20 October 2024 9 | Beşiktaş | 2–0 | Konyaspor | Istanbul |
| 16:00 EET | Immobile 29' (pen.); Rafa Silva 45+2' (yellow card) 50'; Svensson (yellow card) 60' | Report | Demirbağ (yellow card) 33'; Erdoğan (yellow card) 50'; Kramer (yellow card) 59'; Bostan (yellow card) 90+4' | Stadium: Beşiktaş Stadium; Attendance: 37,328; Referee: (Turkey) Kadir Sağlam |

| 27 October 2024 10 | Gaziantep | 3–1 | Konyaspor | Gaziantep |
| 12:30 EET | Ersoy (yellow card) 4' (goal) 28'; Lungoyi 61'; Dervişoğlu (yellow card) 64'; Sorescu 81' | Report | Demirbağ (yellow card) 6'; Ndao 13'; Bazoer (yellow card) 60'; Guilherme (yellow card) 90+8' | Stadium: Gaziantep Stadium; Attendance: 5,805; Referee: (Turkey) Burak Pakkan |

| 3 November 2024 11 | Konyaspor | 3–2 | İstanbul Başakşehir | Konya |
| 12:30 EET | Ndao 32' 50' 73'; Yazğılı (yellow card) 44'; Guilherme (yellow card) 88'; Ülgün (yellow card) 90+1' | Report | Şahiner (yellow card) 17'; Opoku 45+2'; Piątek 90+3'; Türüç (yellow card) 90+7' | Stadium: Konya Metropolitan Municipality Stadium; Attendance: 1,274; Referee: (Turkey) Emre Kargın |

| 10 November 2024 12 | Göztepe | 2–0 | Konyaspor | İzmir |
| 12:30 EET | Rômulo Cardoso (yellow card) 11' (goal) 90+8' (pen.); Bokele (yellow card) 13'; Köybaşı (yellow card) 90+7'; Matsuki 90+10' | Report | Kramer (yellow card) 6'; Bazoer (yellow card) 86'; Keyta (yellow card) 90+7' | Stadium: Gürsel Aksel Stadium; Attendance: 16,923; Referee: (Turkey) Muhammet Metoğlu |

| 24 November 2024 13 | Konyaspor | 1–1 | Hatayspor | Konya |
| 15:00 EET | Jevtović 17' (yellow card) 20'; Bazoer (yellow card) 32'; Pedrinho (yellow card) 62'; Keyta (yellow card) 78' | Report | Diack (yellow card) 31'; Calvo (yellow card) 81'; Aboubakar 90'; Kardeşler (yellow card) 90+6' | Stadium: Konya Metropolitan Municipality Stadium; Attendance: 8,052; Referee: (Turkey) Oğuzhan Çakır |

| 30 November 2024 14 | Adana Demirspor | 0–1 | Konyaspor | Adana |
| 15:00 EET | Abdulsamet Burak (yellow card) 9'; Çelik (yellow card) 90+6'; Güler (yellow card) 90+6' | Report | Boranijašević (yellow card) 29'; Jevtović 78'; Aleksić (yellow card) 90+1'; Słowik (yellow card) 90+3' | Stadium: New Adana Stadium; Attendance: 3,502; Referee: (Turkey) Atilla Karaoğlan |

| 7 December 2024 15 | Konyaspor | 1–1 | Antalyaspor | Konya |
| 12:30 EET | Demirbağ 16'; Bazoer (yellow card) 88'; Ndao (yellow card) 89'; Ülgün (yellow card) 90+8' | Report | Larsson 90+1' (pen.); Townsend (yellow card) 90+7' | Stadium: Konya Metropolitan Municipality Stadium; Attendance: 10,700; Referee: (Turkey) Halil Umut Meler |

| 14 December 2024 16 | Çaykur Rizespor | 1–1 | Konyaspor | Rize |
| 15:00 EET | Olawoyin (yellow card) 25'; Sowe 44'; Aliqulov (yellow card) 90' | Report | Jevtović (yellow card) 36'; Nayir (yellow card) 45+2'; Aleksić 53' | Stadium: Çaykur Didi Stadium; Attendance: 2,897; Referee: (Turkey) Alper Akarsu |

| December 2024 17 | Bye |

| January 3, 2025 18 | Alanyaspor | 2–1 | Konyaspor | Alanya |
| 19:00 EET | Makouta 8'; Özdemir (yellow card) 40'; Hwang Ui-jo (yellow card) 45'; Córdova 54' (yellow card) 67' | Report | Ülgün (yellow card) 13'; Demirbağ (yellow card) 45'; Jevtović (yellow card) 56'; Taşçı (yellow card) 74'; Kramer 90' | Stadium: Alanya Oba Stadium; Referee: (Turkey) Zorbay Küçük |

| January 13, 2025 19 | Konyaspor | 2–3 | Fenerbahçe | Konya |
| 19:00 EET | Pedrinho 1'; Ülgün (yellow card) 29'; Kramer 44'; Bostan (yellow card) 90+4' | Report | Tadić (yellow card) 10' (goal) 61'; Müldür 14'; Söyüncü 25'; Kostić (yellow card) 63' | Stadium: Konya Metropolitan Municipality Stadium; Referee: (Turkey) Direnç Tonusluoğlu |

| January 19, 2025 20 | Konyaspor | 3-3 | Kasımpaşa | Konya |
| 15:00 EET | Jevtović (yellow card) 5'; Kramer 20', 63'; Bazoer (yellow card) 30'; Nayir 82'; Prip (yellow card) 86' | Report | Winck (yellow card) 30'; Çiftpınar (yellow card) 39'; Brekalo 53'; Gül 70'; Barák 87' | Stadium: Konya Metropolitan Municipality Stadium; Referee: (Turkey) Burak Pakkan |

| January 25, 2025 21 | Galatasaray | 1–0 | Konyaspor | Istanbul |
| 18:00 EET | Osimhen 22' (pen.); Akgün (yellow card) 32'; Kutucu (yellow card) 72' | Report | Jevtović (yellow card) 90+5' | Stadium: Ali Sami Yen Sports Complex; Referee: (Turkey) Halil Umut Meler |

| January 31, 2025 22 | Konyaspor | 3–1 | Bodrum | Konya |
| 19:00 EET | Erdoğan 6' (yellow card) 34'; Bazoer (yellow card) 30'; Kramer 36', 55' | Report | Mohammed (yellow card) 41'; Antalyalı (penalty missed); Słowik 69' (o.g.) | Stadium: Konya Metropolitan Municipality Stadium; Referee: (Turkey) Ümit Öztürk |

| February 8, 2025 23 | Kayserispor | 3–2 | Konyaspor | Kayseri |
| 15:00 EET | Nazon 14', 55'; Cardoso 23' (yellow card) 70'; Kocaman (yellow card) 45'; Kaldırım (yellow card) 52' | Report | Boranijašević (yellow card) 5'; Demirbağ (yellow card) 21'; Aleksić 45+1'; Taşçı (yellow card) 52'; Kramer 69'; Boateng (red card) 90+1' | Stadium: Kadir Has Stadium; Referee: (Turkey) Çağdaş Altay |

| February 16, 2025 24 | Konyaspor | 0–1 | Samsunspor | Konya |
| 15:00 EET | Ülgün (yellow card) 8'; Słowik (yellow card) 25'; Aleksić (yellow card) 54'; Jevtović (yellow card) 66' | Report | Bola 2' (yellow card) 90'; Marius (yellow card) 19'; Holse (yellow card) 21'; Aït Bennasser (yellow card) 41'; Yüksel (yellow card) 58'; Aydoğdu (yellow card) 86' | Stadium: Konya Metropolitan Municipality Stadium; Referee: (Turkey) Yasin Kol |

| February 22, 2025 25 | Sivasspor | 1–1 | Konyaspor | Sivas |
| 12:30 EET | Başsan 8'; Paluli (yellow card) 37'; Radaković (red card) 80'; Moutoussamy (yellow card) 90' | Report | Erdoğan 13'; İbrahimoğlu (yellow card) 28'; Ndao (yellow card) 32'; Pedrinho (yellow card) 57'; Yazğılı (yellow card) 85' | Stadium: Sivas Stadium; Referee: (Turkey) Zorbay Küçük |

| March 3, 2025 26 | Konyaspor | 1–0 | Trabzonspor | Konya |
| 15:00 EET | Jevtović (yellow card) 42'; Keyta (yellow card) 90+7'; Yazğılı (yellow card) 90+7'; Nayir 90+10' (pen.) | Report | Malheiro (yellow card) 18'; Eskihellaç (yellow card) 69'; Višća (yellow card) 81'; Çanak (yellow card) 90+7'; Saatçı (yellow card) 90+7' | Stadium: Konya Metropolitan Municipality Stadium; Referee: (Turkey) Ozan Ergün |

| March 9, 2025 27 | Eyüpspor | 2–1 | Konyaspor | Istanbul |
| 15:00 EET | Akbaba 15' (pen.); Mor (yellow card) 23'; Yalçın (yellow card) 49' (yellow card) 90+8' (red card); Bozok 76' (yellow card) 90+4'; Claro (yellow card) 90'; Thiam (yellow card) 90+2' | Report | Ülgün (yellow card) 45+4'; Taşçı 58'; Nayir (yellow card) 90+8'; Kramer (yellow card) 90+9' | Stadium: Recep Tayyip Erdoğan Stadium; Referee: (Turkey) Atilla Karaoğlan |

| March 15, 2025 28 | Konyaspor | 1–0 | Beşiktaş | Konya |
| 19:30 EET | Bostan (red card) 27'; Ndao (yellow card) 27' (yellow card) 64' (red card); Yazğılı 45'; Demirbağ (yellow card) 67' | Report | Sanuç (yellow card) 39'; Kılıçsoy (yellow card) 64' | Stadium: Konya Metropolitan Municipality Stadium; Referee: (Turkey) Ali Şansalan |

| March 28, 2025 29 | Konyaspor | v | Gaziantep | Konya |
| 19:30 EET | Guilherme (yellow card) 16'; Aleksić (yellow card) 45+2'; Kramer (yellow card) 57' (goal) 67'; Ülgün (yellow card) 90+5' | Report | Daubin (yellow card) 32'; Ndiaye (yellow card) 66'; Husić (yellow card) 69'; Okereke (yellow card) 78' | Stadium: Konya Metropolitan Municipality Stadium; Referee: (Turkey) Oğuzhan Çakır |

| April 5, 2025 30 | İstanbul Başakşehir | 1–0 | Konyaspor | Istanbul |
| 15:00 EET | Kemen (yellow card) 41'; Piątek 71' (pen.); Türüç (yellow card) 74' | Report | İbrahimoğlu (yellow card) 38' | Stadium: Başakşehir Fatih Terim Stadium; Referee: (Turkey) Çağdaş Altay |

| April 12, 2025 31 | Konyaspor | 1–0 | Göztepe | Konya |
| 15:00 EET | Kramer 24' (yellow card) 75'; Demirbağ (yellow card) 76'; Ndao (yellow card) 85'; Ertaş (yellow card) 90+1' | Report | Héliton (yellow card) 33' | Stadium: Konya Metropolitan Municipality Stadium; Referee: (Turkey) Ümit Öztürk |

| April 18, 2025 32 | Hatayspor | 2–3 | Konyaspor | Mersin |
| 19:00 EET | Boutobba 28'; Parmak 32'; Çörekçi (yellow card) 70' | Report | Jevtović 10'; Demirbağ (yellow card) 45'; Prip 71'; Ülgün 90' | Stadium: Mersin Stadium; Referee: (Turkey) Halil Umut Meler |

| April 27, 2025 33 | Konyaspor | 3–1 | Adana Demirspor | Konya |
| 15:00 EET | Kramer (yellow card) 12'; İbrahimoğlu (yellow card) 24'; Bazoer (yellow card) 47' (goal) 69', 78'; Burak 90+4' (o.g.) | Report | Kavrazlı 45+3'; Kalender (yellow card) 79'; Kurtulan (yellow card) 90+3'; Demirbağ (yellow card) 90+5' | Stadium: Konya Metropolitan Municipality Stadium; Referee: (Turkey) Arda Kardeşler |

| May 2, 2025 34 | Antalyaspor | 1–0 | Konyaspor | Antalya |
| 19:00 EET | Balcı (yellow card) 28'; Safouri 62' (yellow card) 72'; Sarı (yellow card) 85'; Samudio (yellow card) 86'; Thalisson (yellow card) 90' | Report | Kramer (penalty missed); İbrahimoğlu (yellow card) 64' (yellow card) 86' (red card); Demirbağ (yellow card) 90' | Stadium: Antalya Stadium; Referee: (Turkey) Cihan Aydın |

| May 10, 2025 35 | Konyaspor | 2–1 | Çaykur Rizespor | Konya |
| 15:00 EET | Nayir 47', 77'; Ertaş (yellow card) 90'; Boranijašević (yellow card) 90' | Report | Pala (yellow card) 18'; Alikulov (yellow card) 52'; Varešanović 71' | Stadium: Konya Metropolitan Municipality Stadium; Referee: (Turkey) Ozan Ergün |

| May 2025 36 | Bye |

| May 25, 2025 37 | Konyaspor | 1–2 | Alanyaspor | Konya |
| 18:00 EET | Nayir (yellow card) 44' (goal) 52'; Kramer (yellow card) 55'; İbrahimoğlu (yellow card) 84'; Ülgün (red card) 84'; Pedrinho (yellow card) 90' | Report | Karaca (yellow card) 11'; Hwang Ui-jo 38'; Özdemir 40'; Lima (yellow card) 44'; Aksoy (yellow card) 51'; Aliti (yellow card) 59'; Richard (yellow card) 84' | Stadium: Konya Metropolitan Municipality Stadium; Referee: (Turkey) Atilla Karaoğlan |

| May 31, 2025 38 | Fenerbahçe | 2–1 | Konyaspor | Istanbul |
| 15:00 EET | Talisca (yellow card) 28'; İrfan Can Kahveci 75' (yellow card) 77'; En-Nesyri 82'; Yüksek (yellow card) 84'; Söyüncü (yellow card) 90' | Report | Bostan 4' | Stadium: Şükrü Saracoğlu Stadium; Referee: (Turkey) Oğuzhan Çakır |

=== Turkish Cup ===
| 29 October 2024 Third round | 23 Elazığ | 0-4 | Konyaspor | Elazığ |
| 16:30 EET | Sezer Kahraman (yellow card) 12'; Fatih Onay (yellow card) 65'; Haktan Yüce (yellow card) 88' | Report | Ülgün (yellow card) 24'; Bostan 25' 73'; Adem Eren Kabak 61'; Subaşı 66' (pen.) | Stadium: Elazığ Atatürk; Referee: (Turkey) Yiğit Arslan |

| 4 December 2024 Fourth round | Konyaspor | 9-0 | Kepezspor | Konya |
| 17:00 EET | Kramer 7' 45+2'; Bostan 11' 70' 85'; Prip 36'; Taşçı 42'; Boateng (yellow card) 47'; Aleksić 77'; İbrahimoğlu 89' | Report | | Stadium: Konya Metropolitan Municipality Stadium; Referee: (Turkey) Yusuf Gündüz |
