= Jakub Słowik =

Polish footballer

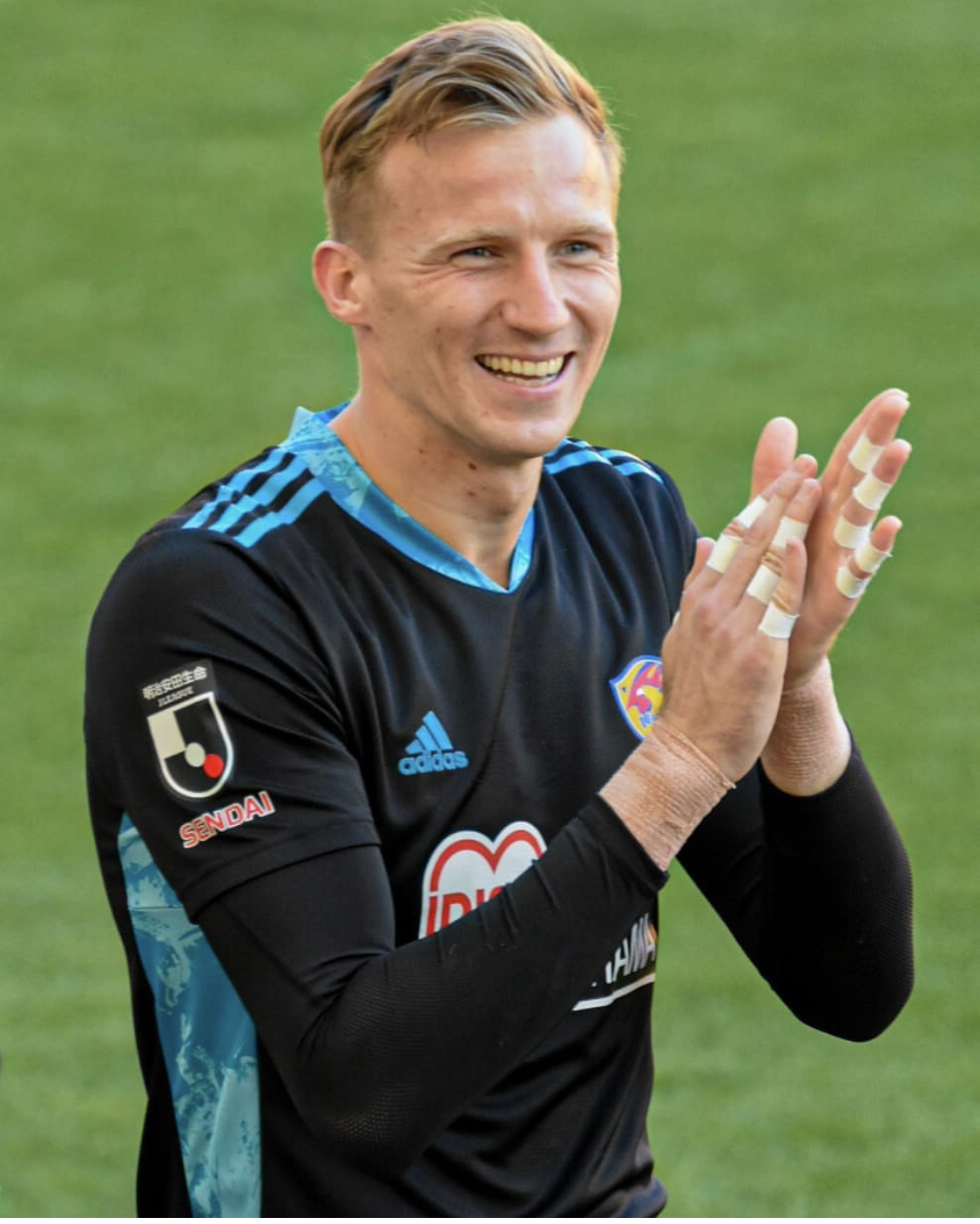
- Słowik in 2021

Personal information
- Full name: Jakub Waldemar Słowik
- Date of birth: 31 August 1991 (age 35)
- Place of birth: Nowy Sącz, Poland
- Height: 1.90 m (6 ft 3 in)
- Position: Goalkeeper

Team information
- Current team: Mito HollyHock (on loan from Yokohama FC)

Youth career
- Sandecja Nowy Sącz
- MSP Szamotuły
- 2007: Sparta Szamotuły
- 2010–2011: Jagiellonia Białystok

Senior career*
Years	Team	Apps	(Gls)
2008	Sparta Szamotuły		
2008–2010	Sparta Oborniki	37	(0)
2010–2014	Jagiellonia Białystok	48	(0)
2012	→ Warta Poznań (loan)	10	(0)
2014	Jagiellonia Białystok II	14	(0)
2015–2017	Pogoń Szczecin	37	(0)
2015–2017	Pogoń Szczecin II	14	(0)
2017–2019	Śląsk Wrocław	55	(1)
2019–2021	Vegalta Sendai	79	(0)
2022–2024	FC Tokyo	57	(0)
2024–2025	Konyaspor	38	(0)
2025–	Yokohama FC	12	(0)
2026–	→ Mito HollyHock (loan)	0	(0)

International career
2010–2011	Poland U20	2	(0)
	Poland U23	1	(0)
2013	Poland	1	(0)
- * Club domestic league appearances and goals as of 22:47, 15 December 2025 (UTC)

Jakub Waldemar Słowik (born 31 August 1991) is a Polish professional footballer who plays as a goalkeeper for J1 League club Mito HollyHock, on loan from Yokohama FC.

== Career ==
In January 2015, Słowik went on a week-long trial with English Championship side Reading. In June 2015, Słowik signed a two-year contract to play for Pogoń Szczecin.

On 22 June 2017, he signed a contract with Śląsk Wrocław.

== Career statistics ==
As of match played 6 December 2025

Appearances and goals by club, season and competition
Club	Season	League			National cup (Note: Includes Polish Cup, Emperor's Cup)		League cup (Note: Includes J. League Cup)		Continental		Other		Total	
Club	Season	Division	Apps	Goals	Apps	Goals	Apps	Goals	Apps	Goals	Apps	Goals	Apps	Goals
Sparta Oborniki	2008–09	III liga, gr. C	13	0	—		—		—		—		13	0
Sparta Oborniki	2009–10	III liga, gr. C	24	0	—		—		—		—		24	0
Sparta Oborniki	Total		37	0	—		—		—		—		37	0
Jagiellonia Białystok	2010–11	Ekstraklasa	1	0	0	0	—		0	0	—		1	0
Jagiellonia Białystok	2011–12	Ekstraklasa	4	0	0	0	—		0	0	—		4	0
Jagiellonia Białystok	2012–13	Ekstraklasa	23	0	3	0	—		—		—		26	0
Jagiellonia Białystok	2013–14	Ekstraklasa	17	0	2	0	—		—		—		19	0
Jagiellonia Białystok	2014–15	Ekstraklasa	3	0	1	0	—		—		—		4	0
Jagiellonia Białystok	Total		48	0	6	0	—		0	0	—		54	0
Warta Poznań (loan)	2011–12	I liga	10	0	—		—		—		—		10	0
Jagiellonia Białystok II	2013–14	III liga, gr. B	4	0	—		—		—		—		4	0
Jagiellonia Białystok II	2014–15	III liga, gr. B	10	0	—		—		—		—		10	0
Jagiellonia Białystok II	Total		14	0	—		—		—		—		14	0
Pogoń Szczecin	2015–16	Ekstraklasa	17	0	1	0	—		—		—		18	0
Pogoń Szczecin	2016–17	Ekstraklasa	20	0	4	0	—		—		—		24	0
Pogoń Szczecin	Total		37	0	5	0	—		—		—		42	0
Pogoń Szczecin II	2015–16	III liga, gr. D	6	0	—		—		—		—		6	0
Pogoń Szczecin II	2016–17	III liga, gr. II	8	0	—		—		—		—		8	0
Pogoń Szczecin II	Total		14	0	—		—		—		—		14	0
Śląsk Wrocław	2017–18	Ekstraklasa	20	0	1	0	—		—		—		21	0
Śląsk Wrocław	2018–19	Ekstraklasa	35	0	0	0	—		—		—		35	0
Śląsk Wrocław	Total		55	0	1	0	—		—		—		56	0
Vegalta Sendai	2019	J1 League	15	0	1	0	0	0	—		—		16	0
Vegalta Sendai	2020	J1 League	27	0	—		1	0	—		—		28	0
Vegalta Sendai	2021	J1 League	37	0	0	0	1	0	—		—		38	0
Vegalta Sendai	Total		79	0	1	0	2	0	—		—		82	0
FC Tokyo	2022	J1 League	33	0	0	0	1	0	—		—		34	0
FC Tokyo	2023	J1 League	24	0	1	0	2	0	—		—		27	0
FC Tokyo	Total		57	0	1	0	3	0	—		—		61	0
Konyaspor	2023–24	Süper Lig	14	0	0	0	—		—		—		14	0
Konyaspor	2024–25	Süper Lig	24	0	0	0	—		—		—		24	0
Konyaspor	Total		38	0	0	0	—		—		—		38	0
Yokohama FC	2025	J1 League	12	0	0	0	0	0	—		—		12	0
Yokohama FC	2026	J2/J3	0	0	—		—		—		—		0	0
Yokohama FC	Total		12	0	0	0	0	0	—		—		12	0
Mito HollyHock (loan)	2026–27	J1 League	0	0	0	0	0	0	—		—		0	0
Career total			391	0	14	0	5	0	—		—		410	0
