= Batuhan Şen =

Turkish association football player

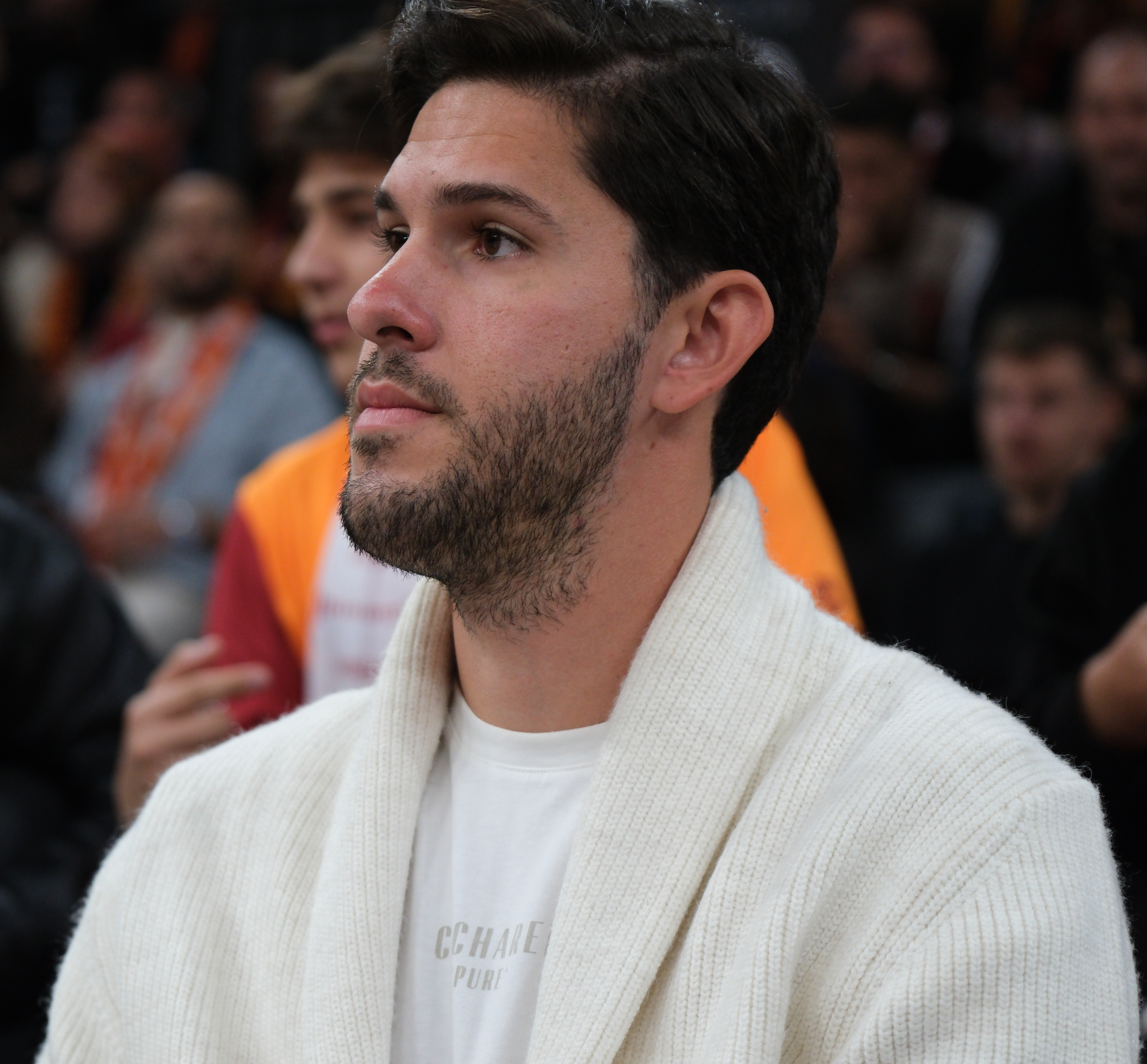

Personal information
- Full name: Batuhan Ahmet Şen
- Date of birth: 3 February 1999 (age 27)
- Place of birth: Bakırköy, Turkey
- Height: 1.94 m (6 ft 4 in)
- Position: Goalkeeper

Team information
- Current team: Fatih Karagümrük
- Number: 23

Youth career
- 2014–2018: Galatasaray

Senior career*
Years	Team	Apps	(Gls)
2018–2026	Galatasaray	2	(0)
2020–2021	→ Hekimoğlu Trabzon (loan)	10	(0)
2021–2022	→ Menemenspor (loan)	41	(0)
2022–2023	→ Fatih Karagümrük (loan)	17	(0)
2023–2024	→ Gaziantep (loan)	4	(0)
2025	→ Kocaelispor (loan)	3	(0)
2026–	Fatih Karagümrük	0	(0)

International career^{‡}
2012	Turkey U14	2	(0)
2014	Turkey U15	1	(0)
2014–2015	Turkey U16	7	(0)
2015–2016	Turkey U17	8	(0)
2016	Turkey U18	2	(0)
2017–2018	Turkey U19	5	(0)
2022	Turkey U23	1	(0)
- * Club domestic league appearances and goals as of 10 June 2026 ‡ National team caps and goals as of 12 August 2022

Batuhan Ahmet Şen (born 3 February 1999) is a Turkish professional footballer who plays as a goalkeeper for TFF 1. Lig club Fatih Karagümrük.

== Professional career ==
=== Galatasaray ===
Galatasaray announced on August 9, 2022 that Şen's contract was extended until the end of the 2025-26 season.

==== Hekimoğlu Trabzon (loan) ====
On 16 January 2020, Galatasaray officially announced that the then 20-year-old goalkeeper Batuhan was loaned to Hekimoğlu Trabzon.

==== Menemenspor (loan) ====
On 26 January 2021, Galatasaray loaned the young goalkeeper to Menemenspor, coached by Ümit Karan.

==== Fatih Karagümrük (loan) ====
Galatasaray announced on 9 August 2022 that Şen was being loaned to the Süper Lig team Fatih Karagümrük club for 1 year.

==== Gaziantep (loan) ====
On 1 August 2023, he was loaned to Gaziantep, the Süper Lig team, for one year.

== Honours ==
Galatasaray

- Süper Lig: 2017–18, 2018–19, 2024–25, 2025–26
- Turkish Cup: 2018–19, 2024–25
