= Metehan Baltacı =

Turkish association football player

Personal information
- Date of birth: 3 November 2002 (age 24)
- Place of birth: Fatih, Turkey
- Height: 1.89 m (6 ft 2 in)
- Position: Centre-back

Team information
- Current team: Gençlerbirliği (on loan from Galatasaray)

Youth career
- 2012–2021: Galatasaray

Senior career*
Years	Team	Apps	(Gls)
2021–	Galatasaray	12	(0)
2021–2022	→ İskenderunspor (loan)	27	(2)
2023	→ Manisa (loan)	9	(0)
2023–2024	→ Eyüpspor (loan)	27	(0)
2026–	→ Gençlerbirliği (loan)	0	(0)

International career^{‡}
2019–2020	Turkey U18	7	(0)
2022–2024	Turkey U21	12	(1)
- * Club domestic league appearances and goals as of 10 June 2026 ‡ National team caps and goals as of 22:49, 15 October 2024 (UTC)

Metehan Baltacı (born 3 November 2002) is a Turkish footballer who plays as a centre-back for Gençlerbirliği.

== Professional career ==
=== Galatasaray ===
Baltacı is a product of the Galatasaray youth academy, joining in 2012.

==== İskenderunspor (loan) ====
A youth product of Galatasaray, Baltacı began his senior career on a season-long loan with İskenderunspor in the TFF Third League on 7 August 2021.

==== Return to Galatasaray after loan ====
He returned to Galatasaray the following season and on 19 October 2022, he made his senior debut with Galatasaray in a 7–0 Turkish Cup win over Kastamonuspor on 19 October 2022. On 1 February 2022, he extended his contract with Galatasaray until 2026.

==== Manisa (loan) ====
That same day, he joined Manisa on loan for the second half of the 2022–23 season in the TFF First League.

==== Eyüpspor (loan) ====
On 6 August 2023, he joined Eyüpspor on loan for the 2023–24 season in the TFF First League.

==== Return to Galatasaray after second loan ====
On 13 November 2025, Baltacı was banned from playing for 9 months for his involvement in the 2025 Turkish football betting scandal. He is being remanded in custody, meaning he is in prison.

==== Gençlerbirliği (loan) ====
On August 22, 2026, he signed a loan agreement with Gençlerbirliği valid until the end of the 2026–27 season.

== International career ==
Baltacı is a youth international for Turkey, having played up to the Turkey U21s since 2022.

== Betting investigation ==
As part of an investigation conducted by the Istanbul Chief Public Prosecutor's Office, known to the public as the “Football Betting Investigations,” Metehan Baltacı was detained on 5 December 2025 after it was determined that he had placed bets on legal betting sites. On 27 February 2026, an indictment was prepared against him, seeking a prison sentence ranging from 4 to 13 years. Baltacı was released on March 25.

== Honours ==
Eyüpspor

- TFF 1. Lig: 2023–24

Galatasaray

- Süper Lig: 2022–23, 2024–25, 2025–26
- Turkish Cup: 2024–25
