= Baran Demiroğlu =

Turkish footballer (born 2005)

Personal information
- Date of birth: 2 May 2005 (age 21)
- Place of birth: Bahçelievler, Turkey
- Height: 1.85 m (6 ft 1 in)
- Position: Forward

Team information
- Current team: Pendikspor
- Number: 19

Youth career
- 2014–2016: Bakirköy Aslanspor
- 2016–2024: Galatasaray

Senior career*
| Years | Team | Apps | (Gls) |
| 2024–2025 | Galatasaray | 2 | (0) |
| 2024–2025 | → Fatih Karagümrük (loan) | 14 | (2) |
| 2025 | Sarıyer | 0 | (0) |
| 2025–2026 | Menemen | 27 | (6) |
| 2026– | Pendikspor | 0 | (0) |

International career^{‡}
| 2022 | Turkey U18 | 2 | (1) |
- * Club domestic league appearances and goals as of 7 November 2026 ‡ National team caps and goals as of 5 January 2023

Baran Demiroğlu (born 2 May 2005) is a Turkish professional footballer who plays as a forward for TFF 1. Lig club Pendikspor.

== Youth career ==
Demiroğlu is a youth product of Bakirköy Aslanspor, before moving to Galatasaray's youth academy in 2016.

== Club career ==
=== Galatasaray ===
In November 2022 he received his first call-up to the senior team, and signed a professional contract until 2025. He made his senior and professional debut with Galatasaray as a late substitute in a 1–1 Süper Lig tie with Sivasspor on 11 January 2024.

On 14 August 2024, it was announced that Demiroğlu's contract was extended until the end of the 2027–28 season.

==== Fatih Karagümrük (loan) ====
On 14 August 2024, it was announced that he was loaned to Fatih Karagümrük until the end of the 2024–25 season.

=== Sarıyer ===
He signed a 2–year contract with Sarıyer on 18 July 2025. The contract was mutually terminated on 21 September 2025.

=== Menemen ===
On 2 September 2025, Demiroğlu signed a two-season contract with Menemen in TFF 2. Lig.

== International career ==
Demiroğlu is a youth international for Turkey, having played for the Turkey U18s for a set of friendlies in August 2022.
