= Melih İbrahimoğlu =

Turkish footballer (born 2000)

Personal information
- Date of birth: 17 July 2000 (age 26)
- Place of birth: Vienna, Austria
- Height: 1.75 m (5 ft 9 in)
- Position: Attacking midfielder

Team information
- Current team: Konyaspor
- Number: 77

Youth career
- –2018: Rapid Wien

Senior career*
Years	Team	Apps	(Gls)
2018–2021	Rapid Wien II	42	(11)
2019–2021	Rapid Wien	4	(0)
2021–2024	Heracles Almelo	7	(0)
2023	→ Admira Wacker (loan)	12	(0)
2024	Egnatia	20	(4)
2024–	Konyaspor	58	(1)

International career^{‡}
2019	Austria U20	2	(0)
2020	Turkey U21	1	(0)
- * Club domestic league appearances and goals as of 10 June 2026 ‡ National team caps and goals as of 17 November 2020

Melih İbrahimoğlu (born 17 July 2000) is a professional footballer who plays as an attacking midfielder for Süper Lig club Konyaspor. Born in Austria, he represents Turkey internationally.

== Club career ==
In the 2018–19 season, Ibrahimoglu scored 7 goals and made 12 assists for Rapid Wien II, Rapid Wien's reserve team playing in the Austrian third tier. In the following 2019–20 season he made his first-team debut in the Austrian Bundesliga in a 3–3 draw against TSV Hartberg.

On 23 December 2022, İbrahimoğlu agreed to join Admira Wacker on loan for the second half of the 2022–23 season.

== International career ==
Born in Austria, Ibrahimoglu is of Turkish descent. Ibrahimoglu made two appearances for the Austria U20 national team in 2019. İbrahimoğlu switched to represent the Turkey U21s, and debuted with them in a 3–0 win over Kosovo U21 on 17 November 2020.
