= Pedrinho (footballer, born 1996) =

Brazilian footballer

Personal information
- Full name: Pedro Henrique Oliveira dos Santos
- Date of birth: 19 December 1996 (age 29)
- Place of birth: Mauá, Brazil
- Height: 1.76 m (5 ft 9 in)
- Position: Forward

Team information
- Current team: Batman Petrolspor
- Number: 10

Youth career
- Atlético Goianiense

Senior career*
Years	Team	Apps	(Gls)
2016–2018	Tigres do Brasil		
2018	Bolamense	8	(1)
2018–2019	America RJ	10	(2)
2020–2023	Volta Redonda	61	(16)
2021	→ Criciúma (loan)	29	(4)
2023	CSKA 1948 II	2	(1)
2023–2024	CSKA 1948	46	(12)
2024–2026	Konyaspor	47	(5)
2026–	Batman Petrolspor	10	(3)
- * Club domestic league appearances and goals as of 18 October 2026

Pedro Henrique Oliveira dos Santos (born 19 December 1996), known also as Pedrinho is a Brazilian professional footballer who plays as a forward for Turkish TFF 1. Lig club Batman Petrolspor.

== Career ==
In 2022 Pedrinho joined Volta Redonda. In February 2021 he moved on loan to Criciúma, before returning again for Volta. On 17 December 2022, he was announced as the new player of CSKA 1948.
