= Deniz Ertaş =

Moldovan-Turkish professional footballer

Personal information
- Date of birth: 20 March 2005 (age 21)
- Place of birth: Konak, Turkey
- Height: 1.93 m (6 ft 4 in)
- Position: Goalkeeper

Team information
- Current team: Konyaspor
- Number: 1

Youth career
- 2015–2017: Kuşadası Küçükadaspor
- 2017–2018: Altınordu
- 2018–2019: Bursaspor
- 2019–2023: Konyaspor

Senior career*
Years	Team	Apps	(Gls)
2023–	Konyaspor	31	(0)

International career
2022	Turkey U17	1	(0)
2022–2023	Turkey U18	4	(0)
2023–2024	Turkey U19	4	(0)
2024–	Turkey U20	3	(0)
- * Club domestic league appearances and goals as of 10 June 2026

Deniz Ertaş (born 20 March 2005) is a Moldovan-Turkish professional footballer who plays as a goalkeeper for Konyaspor.

== Club career ==
Ertaş is a youth product of Kuşadası Küçükadaspor, Altınordu, Bursaspor and Konyaspor. On 2 November 2022, he signed his first professional contract with Konyaspor for 3 years. He made his senior and professional debut with Konyaspor in a 3–0 Turkish Cup win over Erbaaspor on 2 November 2023. On 5 December 2023, he again extended his contract with the club until 2027. In January 2024, he started making league appearances in the Süper Lig with the senior team.

== International career ==
Born in Izmir, Turkey, Ertaş is of Moldovan descent through his mother, and holds dual Turkish-Moldovan citizenship. In April 2021, he was first called up to the Turkey U16s for a preparatory camp. He was part of the Turkey U19 squad for the 2024 UEFA European Under-19 Championship. In October 2024, he was called up to the Turkey U20s for Under 20 Elite League matches.

== Career statistics ==
=== Club ===
As of match played 17 May 2026

Appearances and goals by club, season and competition
Club	Season	League			Cup		Europe		Other		Total	
Club	Season	Division	Apps	Goals	Apps	Goals	Apps	Goals	Apps	Goals	Apps	Goals
Konyaspor	2022–23	Süper Lig	0	0	0	0	—		—		38	8
Konyaspor	2023–24	Süper Lig	7	0	5	0	—		—		12	0
Konyaspor	2024–25	Süper Lig	12	0	8	0	—		—		20	0
Konyaspor	2025–26	Süper Lig	12	0	6	0	—		—		18	0
Konyaspor	Total		31	0	19	0	—		—		50	0
Career total			31	0	19	0	0	0	0	0	50	0
