= 2025–26 Galatasaray S.K. season =

Galatasaray
2025–26 season
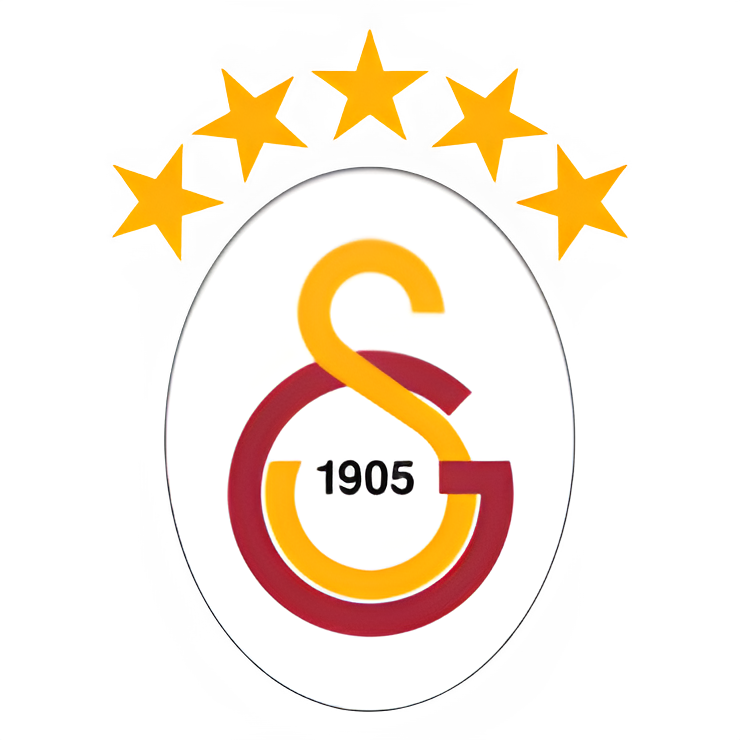
- President: Dursun Özbek
- Head coach: Okan Buruk
- Stadium: Rams Park
- Süper Lig: 1st
- Turkish Cup: Quarter-finals
- Turkish Super Cup: Runners-up
- UEFA Champions League: Round of 16
- Top goalscorer: League: Victor Osimhen (15); All: Victor Osimhen (22)
- Highest home attendance: 53,513 vs Fenerbahçe, 26 April 2026, Süper Lig
- Lowest home attendance: 27,741 vs Gaziantep 17 January 2026, Süper Lig
- Average home league attendance: 45,432
- Biggest win: 4–0 vs Kayserispor (A), 24 August 2025, Süper Lig; 4–0 vs Kayserispor (H), 1 February 2026, Süper Lig; 5–1 vs Eyüpspor (H), 13 February 2026, Süper Lig
- Biggest defeat: 1–5 vs Eintracht Frankfurt (A), 18 September 2025, UEFA Champions League; 0–4 vs Liverpool (A), 18 March 2026, UEFA Champions League
Home colours	Away colours	Third colours

The 2025–26 season was the 121st season in the existence of Galatasaray S.K., and the club's 68th consecutive season in the top flight of Turkish football. In addition to the domestic league, Galatasaray participated in this season's edition of the Turkish Cup, Turkish Super Cup and UEFA Champions League.

== Kits ==
Galatasaray's 2025–26 kits, manufactured by Puma, were unveiled on 26 June 2025 and went on sale on the same day.

=== Sponsor ===
- Supplier: Puma
- Main sponsor: Pasifik Holding
- Main sponsor (Europe): SOCAR
- Side sponsor: Alfemo
- Back sponsor: CW Enerji
- Sleeve sponsor: Arkham Intelligence, Misli
- Sleeve sponsor (Europe): Turkish Airlines
- Shorts sponsor: Lydia Holding, Bulls Yatırım
- Socks sponsor: NGN

=== Match ===
Home
Home alt.
Home alt.
Away
Third
Fourth
Goalkeeper 1
Goalkeeper 2
Goalkeeper 3

== Season overview ==
=== Pre-season ===
This season was the very first since 2010–11 without Fernando Muslera, who departed the club after his contract expired.

On 12 June, Leroy Sané transferred to the club from Bayern Munich and signed a contract until 2028.

On 19 June, Galatasaray signed a sponsorship deal with Pasifik Holding, which became the chest sponsor for the 2025–26 season during the domestic matches only in exchange for $10 million.

On 20 June, Galatasaray's pre-2025–26 season camp program was announced.

On 4 July, the 2025–26 Süper Lig fixtures were announced.

On 4 July, Galatasaray began its preparations for the 2025–26 season with a training session at Kemerburgaz Metin Oktay Facilities.

On 31 July, Victor Osimhen transferred to the club from Napoli permanently and signed a contract until 2029. Galatasaray paid Napoli a fee of €75 million for the transfer. Osimhen's transfer broke the record for the largest in Turkish football.

=== August ===
On 28 August, Wilfried Singo transferred to the club from AS Monaco and signed a contract until 2030.

On 28 August, Galatasaray's leagje phase opponents in the 2025–26 Champions League were announced.

=== September ===
On 2 September, Uğurcan Çakır transferred to the club from Trabzonspor and signed a contract until 2030.

On 2 September, İlkay Gündoğan transferred to the club from Manchester City and signed a contract until 2027.

=== November ===
On 13 November, Eren Elmalı was banned from playing for 45 days for his involvement in the 2025 Turkish football betting scandal.

On 13 November, Metehan Baltacı was banned from playing for 9 months for his involvement in the 2025 Turkish football betting scandal.

=== December ===
On 21 December, Mauro Icardi scored his 60th goal for Galatasaray against Kasımpaşa, breaking the legendary Gheorghe Hagi's record for most league goals scored by a foreign player for the club.

=== January ===
On 23 January, Noa Lang joined the team on loan from Napoli until the end of the season.

On 30 January, Galatasaray were drawn against Italian side Juventus in the Champions League knockout phase play-offs.

=== February ===
On 4 February, Icardi became the highest-scoring foreign player in the history of the club.

On 5 February, Sacha Boey joined the team on loan from Bayern Munich until the end of the season.

On 5 February, Renato Nhaga transferred to the club from Casa Pia and signed a contract until 2030.

On 17 February, Galatasaray defeated Juventus 5–2 in the first leg of the Champions League knockout phase play-offs.

On 25 February, Galatasaray, despite losing 3–2 after extra time to Juventus in extra time in the second leg, advanced to the Champions League round of 16 with a 7–5 victory on aggregate.

On 25 February, Nigerian player Victor Osimhen surpassed Milan Baroš (12) to become the foreign player with the most goals in European competitions in Galatasaray history (13).

On 27 February, the Champions League round of 16 pairings were announced. Galatasaray were drawn against English champions Liverpool, playing the first leg at home on 10 March and the return leg away on 18 March.

=== March ===
On 7 March, in the 25th matchday of the Süper Lig, Galatasaray defeated Beşiktaş 1–0 away in the derby match.

On 10 March, Galatasaray beat Liverpool 1–0 in the first leg of their Champions League round of 16 match, gaining an advantage ahead of the return leg.

=== May ===
On 9 May, in the 33rd matchday of the Süper Lig, Galatasaray defeated Antalyaspor 4–2 at home, securing the 2025–26 Süper Lig title with one match remaining.

== Management team ==
Position	Staff
Head coach	(Turkey) Okan Buruk
Assistant Coach	(Turkey) İrfan Saraloğlu
Assistant Coach	(Spain) Ismael García Gómez
Goalkeeping Coach	(Turkey) Fadıl Koşutan
Goalkeeping Coach	(Turkey) Can Okuyucu
Athletic Performance Coach	(Turkey) Dursun Genç
Athletic Performance Coach	(Turkey) Kaan Arısoy
Athletic Performance Coach	(Turkey) Yusuf Köklü
Athletic Performance Coach	(Turkey) Gürkan Fuat Demir
Match and Performance Analyst	(Turkey) Yılmaz Yüksel
Match and Performance Analyst	(Turkey) Serhat Doğan
Match and Performance Analyst	(Turkey) M. Can Mutlu
Administrative Manager	(Turkey) Uğur Yıldız
Scouting and Performance Analysis Manager	(Turkey) Emre Utkucan
Research and Development Director	(Germany) (Turkey) Fatih Demireli
Doctor	(Turkey) Yener İnce
Doctor	(Turkey) Hakan Çelebi
Media and Communications Manager	(Turkey) Coşkun Gülbahar
Media Officer	(Turkey) Egehan Şengül
Interpreter	(Turkey) Ersan Zeren
Interpreter	(Turkey) Utku Yurtbil
Nutritionist	(Turkey) Mestan Hüseyin Çilekçi
Physiotherapist	(Turkey) Mustafa Korkmaz
Physiotherapist	(Turkey) Burak Koca
Physiotherapist	(Turkey) Samet Polat
Physiotherapist	(Turkey) Erkan Özyılmaz
Masseur	(Turkey) Sedat Peker
Masseur	(Turkey) Batuhan Erkan
Masseur	(Turkey) Ozan Abaylı
Masseur	(Turkey) Serdal Yılmaz
Material Manager	(Turkey) Hasan Çelik
Material Manager	(Turkey) Veli Muğlı
Material Manager	(Turkey) İlyas Gökçe

Last updated: 24 May 2025.
Source: Galatasaray.org

== Players ==
=== First team ===
Notes:

- Players and squad numbers last updated on 3 May 2026. Age as of 30 June 2026.
- Flags indicate national team as defined under FIFA eligibility rules. Players may hold more than one non-FIFA nationality.

No.	Player	Nat.	Position(s)	Date of birth (Age)	Signed in	Contract ends	Transfer fee	Ref.
Goalkeepers
1	Uğurcan Çakır	(Turkey)	GK	5 April 1996 (aged 30)	2025	2030	€27,500,000	
12	Batuhan Şen	(Turkey)	GK	3 February 1999 (aged 27)	2019	2026	Youth system	
19	Günay Güvenç	(Turkey) (Germany)	GK	25 June 1991 (aged 35)	2023	2028	€250,000	
Defenders
3	Metehan Baltacı	(Turkey)	CB	3 November 2002 (aged 23)	2021	2028	Youth system	
4	Ismail Jakobs	(Senegal) (Germany)	LB	17 August 1999 (aged 26)	2024	2029	€8,000,000	
6	Davinson Sánchez	(Colombia)	CB	12 June 1996 (aged 30)	2023	2029	€9,500,000	
17	Eren Elmalı	(Turkey)	LB	7 July 2000 (aged 25)	2025	2028	€3,500,000	
23	Kaan Ayhan (vice-captain)	(Turkey) (Germany)	CB	10 November 1994 (aged 31)	2023	2028	€2,800,000	
42	Abdülkerim Bardakcı (3rd captain)	(Turkey)	CB	7 September 1994 (aged 31)	2022	2027	€2,800,000	
90	Wilfried Singo	(Ivory Coast)	RB	25 December 2000 (aged 25)	2025	2030	€30,800,000	
91	Arda Ünyay	(Turkey)	CB	18 January 2007 (aged 19)	2025	2028	€500,000	
93	Sacha Boey	(France)	RB	13 September 2000 (aged 25)	2026	2026	Loan	
Midfielders
7	Roland Sallai	(Hungary)	RW	22 May 1997 (aged 29)	2024	2028	€6,000,000	
8	Gabriel Sara	(Brazil)	CM	26 June 1999 (aged 27)	2024	2029	€18,000,000	
10	Leroy Sané	(Germany) (France)	RW	11 January 1996 (aged 30)	2025	2028	Free	
11	Yunus Akgün	(Turkey)	RW	7 July 2000 (aged 25)	2018	2029	Youth system	
20	İlkay Gündoğan	(Germany)	CM	24 October 1990 (aged 35)	2025	2027	Free	
22	Yáser Asprilla	(Colombia)	RW	19 November 2003 (aged 22)	2026	2026	Loan	
27	Can Armando Güner	(Argentina) (Germany)	RW	7 January 2008 (aged 18)	2026	2030	€350,000	
33	Gökdeniz Gürpüz	(Germany) (Turkey)	CM	1 March 2006 (aged 20)	2023	2026	€225,000	
34	Lucas Torreira	(Uruguay) (Spain)	DM	11 February 1996 (aged 30)	2022	2028	€6,000,000	
53	Barış Alper Yılmaz	(Turkey)	LW	23 May 2000 (aged 26)	2021	2028	Undisclosed	
74	Renato Nhaga	(Guinea-Bissau) (Portugal)	CM	27 March 2007 (aged 19)	2026	2030	€6,500,000	
77	Noa Lang	(Netherlands) (Suriname)	LW	17 June 1999 (aged 27)	2026	2026	Loan	
99	Mario Lemina	(Gabon) (France)	DM	1 September 1993 (aged 32)	2025	2026	€2,500,000	
Forwards
9	Mauro Icardi (captain)	(Argentina) (Italy)	CF	19 February 1993 (aged 33)	2022	2026	€10,000,000	
21	Ahmed Kutucu	(Turkey) (Germany)	CF	1 March 2000 (aged 26)	2025	2028	€5,900,000	
45	Victor Osimhen	(Nigeria)	CF	29 December 1998 (aged 27)	2024	2029	€75,000,000	
Player(s) on loan during the season
5	Eyüp Aydın	(Germany) (Turkey)	DM	2 August 2004 (aged 21)	2023	2027	€250,000	
14	Wilfried Zaha	(Ivory Coast) (England)	RW	10 November 1992 (aged 33)	2023	2026	Free	
22	Nicolò Zaniolo	(Italy)	AM	2 July 1999 (aged 26)	2023	2027	€15,000,000	
24	Elias Jelert	(Denmark)	RB	12 June 2003 (aged 23)	2024	2029	€9,000,000	
25	Victor Nelsson	(Denmark)	CB	14 October 1998 (aged 27)	2021	2027	€7,000,000	
26	Carlos Cuesta	(Colombia)	CB	9 March 1999 (aged 27)	2025	2028	€8,000,000	
29	Przemysław Frankowski	(Poland)	RW/RWB	12 April 1995 (aged 30)	2025	2028	€7,000,000	
47	İlhami Siraçhan Nas	(Turkey)	AM	20 June 2002 (aged 24)	2023	2028	€340,000	
50	Jankat Yılmaz	(Turkey)	GK	16 August 2004 (aged 21)	2022	2027	Youth system	
58	Ali Yeşilyurt	(Turkey)	CB	30 July 2005 (aged 20)	2023	2028	Youth system	
67	Berat Luş	(Turkey)	LW	20 April 2007 (aged 19)	2024	2027	Youth system	
72	Ali Turap Bülbül	(Turkey)	RB	25 January 2005 (aged 21)	2023	2027	Youth system	
88	Kazımcan Karataş	(Turkey)	LB	16 January 2003 (aged 23)	2022	2027	€1,150,000	
–	Halil Dervişoğlu	(Turkey) (Netherlands)	CF	8 December 1999 (aged 26)	2023	2027	€500,000	
–	Ali Efe Çördek	(Turkey)	LW	6 May 2005 (aged 21)	2024	2028	Undisclosed	

=== Reserve team ===
N	Pos.	Nat.	Name	Age	EU	Since	App	Goals	Ends	Transfer fee	Notes
57	MF	(Turkey)	Necati Oğulcan Yançel	17	Non-EU	2025	0	0	–	Youth system	
62	FW	(Turkey)	Ada Yüzgeç	17	Non-EU	2024	0	0	–	Youth system	
63	MF	(Turkey)	İsa Halidi	20	Non-EU	2023	0	0	2027	Youth system	
64	DF	(Turkey)	Yusuf Dağhan Kahraman	18	Non-EU	2025	0	0	2028	Youth system	
65	MF	(Turkey)	Ege Araç	19	Non-EU	2024	0	0	2027	Youth system	
67	MF	(Turkey)	Eyüp Can Karasu	19	Non-EU	2024	0	0	–	Youth system	
68	MF	(Turkey)	Furkan Koçak	18	Non-EU	2024	0	0	–	Youth system	
70	GK	(Turkey)	Enes Emre Büyük	20	Non-EU	2023	0	0	2027	Youth system	
72	FW	(Turkey)	Çağrı Hakan Balta	18	Non-EU	2024	0	0	2026	Youth system	

- Last updated: 13 January 2026
- Source: Galatasaray.org
- Ordered by squad number.

== Contracts and transfers ==
=== New contracts ===
Date	No.	Pos.	Player	Until	Team	Ref.
5 August 2025	11	MF	(Turkey) Yunus Akgün	30 June 2029	First team	
15 August 2025	19	GK	(Turkey) (Germany) Günay Güvenç	30 June 2028	First team	
15 August 2025	6	DF	(Colombia) Davinson Sánchez	30 June 2029	First team	
15 August 2025	70	GK	(Turkey) Enes Emre Büyük	30 June 2027	Academy	
23 September 2025	5	MF	(Turkey) (Germany) Eyüp Aydın	30 June 2027	First team	

=== Transfers in ===
Date	No.	Pos.	Player	From	Fee	Team	Ref.
11 June 2025	10	MF	(Germany) (France) Leroy Sané	(Germany) Bayern Munich	Free	First team	
1 July 2025	4	DF	(Senegal) (Germany) Ismail Jakobs	(France) Monaco	€8,000,000	First team	
1 July 2025	29	DF	(Poland) Przemysław Frankowski	(France) Lens	€7,000,000	First team	
30 July 2025	45	FW	(Nigeria) Victor Osimhen	(Italy) Napoli	€75,000,000	First team	
3 August 2025	–	FW	(Turkey) Mustafa Duru	(Turkey) Altınordu	Undisclosed	Academy	
3 August 2025	–	GK	(Turkey) Arda Yılmaz	(Turkey) Altınordu	Undisclosed	Academy	
28 August 2025	90	DF	(Ivory Coast) Wilfried Singo	(France) Monaco	€30,800,000	First team	
2 September 2025	1	GK	(Turkey) Uğurcan Çakır	(Turkey) Trabzonspor	€27,500,000 + Add-ons	First team	
2 September 2025	20	MF	(Germany) İlkay Gündoğan	(England) Manchester City	Free	First team	
5 February 2026	74	MF	(Guinea-Bissau) (Portugal) Renato Nhaga	(Portugal) Casa Pia	€6,500,000	First team	
5 February 2026	27	MF	(Argentina) (Germany) Can Armando Güner	(Germany) Borussia Mönchengladbach II	€350,000	First team	

=== Loans in ===
Date	No.	Pos.	Player	From	Fee	Option to buy	Team	Ref.
23 January 2026	77	MF	(Netherlands) (Suriname) Noa Lang	(Italy) Napoli	€2,000,000	Yes	First team	
25 January 2026	22	MF	(Colombia) Yáser Asprilla	(Spain) Girona	Free	Yes	First team	
5 February 2026	93	DF	(France) Sacha Boey	(Germany) Bayern Munich	€500,000	Yes	First team	

=== Loan returns ===
Date	No.	Pos.	Player	Returning from	Fee	Team	Ref.
30 June 2025	4	DF	(Denmark) Mathias Ross	(Czech Republic) Sparta Prague	Loan return	First team	
30 June 2025	12	GK	(Turkey) Batuhan Şen	(Turkey) Kocaelispor	Loan return	First team	
30 June 2025	17	DF	(Germany) (Ghana) Derrick Köhn	(Germany) Werder Bremen	Loan return	First team	
30 June 2025	17	MF	(Italy) Nicolò Zaniolo	(Italy) Fiorentina	Loan return	First team	
30 June 2025	21	FW	(Turkey) (Netherlands) Halil Dervişoğlu	(Turkey) Gaziantep	Loan return	First team	
30 June 2025	25	DF	(Denmark) Victor Nelsson	(Italy) Roma	Loan return	First team	
30 June 2025	47	MF	(Turkey) İlhami Siraçhan Nas	(Turkey) Boluspor	Loan return	First team	
30 June 2025	48	DF	(Turkey) Taylan Antalyalı	(Turkey) Bodrum	Loan return	First team	
30 June 2025	56	FW	(Turkey) Baran Demiroğlu	(Turkey) Fatih Karagümrük	Loan return	First team	
30 June 2025	63	MF	(Turkey) (Bulgaria) Baran Aksaka	(Turkey) 68 Aksarayspor	Loan return	First team	–
30 June 2025	64	FW	(Turkey) Eren Aydın	(Turkey) Sarıyer	Loan return	First team	
30 June 2025	72	DF	(Turkey) Ali Turap Bülbül	(Turkey) Ümraniyespor	Loan return	First team	
30 June 2025	88	DF	(Turkey) Kazımcan Karataş	(Russia) Orenburg	Loan return	First team	
30 June 2025	–	MF	(Turkey) Ali Efe Çördek	(Turkey) Ankara Demirspor	Loan return	First team	
30 June 2025	–	MF	(Turkey) Berat Yılmaz	(Turkey) İskenderunspor	Loan return	Academy	
1 September 2025	–	DF	(Turkey) Ali Yeşilyurt	(Moldova) Zimbru Chișinău	Loan return	First team	
2 February 2026	5	MF	(Germany) (Turkey) Eyüp Aydın	(Turkey) Samsunspor	Loan return	First team	

=== Released ===
Date	No.	Pos.	Player	Subsequent club	Fee	Team	Ref.
30 June 2025	38	GK	(Turkey) Atakan Nuri Ordu	(Turkey) Galata Spor Kulübü	End of contract	First team	
30 June 2025	1	GK	(Uruguay) (Italy) Fernando Muslera	(Argentina) Estudiantes (LP)	End of contract	First team	
30 June 2025	10	FW	(Belgium) Dries Mertens	Retired	End of contract	First team	

=== Transfers out ===
Date	No.	Pos.	Player	To	Fee	Team	Ref.
2 July 2025	8	MF	(Germany) (Turkey) Kerem Demirbay	(Turkey) Eyüpspor	Contract termination	First team	
4 July 2025	–	DF	(Denmark) Mathias Ross	(England) Plymouth Argyle	Contract termination	First team	
8 July 2025	48	MF	(Turkey) Taylan Antalyalı	(Turkey) Çaykur Rizespor	Contract termination	First team	
18 July 2025	56	FW	(Turkey) Baran Demiroğlu	(Turkey) Sarıyer	Contract termination	First team	
11 August 2025	77	FW	(Spain) Álvaro Morata	(Italy) Milan	€5,000,000	First team	
11 August 2025	63	MF	(Turkey) (Bulgaria) Baran Aksaka	(Turkey) İskenderunspor	Contract termination	First team	
19 August 2025	27	DF	(Germany) (Ghana) Derrick Köhn	(Germany) Union Berlin	€4,000,000 + Add-ons	First team	
1 September 2025	83	MF	(Turkey) Efe Akman	(Spain) Andorra	Undisclosed	First team	
5 September 2025	64	FW	(Turkey) Eren Aydın	(Ukraine) Veres Rivne	Contract termination	First team	
4 January 2026	18	MF	(Turkey) (Switzerland) Berkan Kutlu	(Turkey) Konyaspor	Contract termination	First team	
5 February 2026	30	MF	(Austria) Yusuf Demir	(Austria) Rapid Wien	Undisclosed	First team	

=== Loans ended ===
Date	No.	Pos.	Player	Returning to	Fee	Team	Ref.
30 June 2025	4	DF	(Senegal) (Germany) Ismail Jakobs	(France) Monaco	Loan return	First team	
30 June 2025	29	MF	(Poland) Przemysław Frankowski	(France) RC Lens	Loan return	First team	
30 June 2025	45	FW	(Nigeria) Victor Osimhen	(Italy) Napoli	Loan return	First team	

=== Loans out ===
Date	No.	Pos.	Player	Loaned to	Fee	On loan until	Team	Ref.
22 January 2025	14	MF	(Ivory Coast) (England) Wilfried Zaha	(United States) Charlotte FC	€4,000,000	30 June 2026	First team	
12 February 2025	58	DF	(Turkey) Ali Yeşilyurt	(Moldova) Zimbru Chișinău	Undisclosed	26 January 2026	First team	
8 July 2025	–	FW	(Turkey) (Netherlands) Halil Dervişoğlu	(Turkey) Çaykur Rizespor	Undisclosed	End of season	First team	
27 July 2025	67	MF	(Turkey) Berat Luş	(Turkey) Esenler Erokspor	Undisclosed	End of season	First team	
3 August 2025	29	DF	(Poland) Przemysław Frankowski	(France) Stade Rennais	€5,500,000 + Add-ons	30 June 2027	First team	
4 August 2025	72	DF	(Turkey) Ali Turap Bülbül	(Turkey) Ümraniyespor	Undisclosed	End of season	First team	
18 August 2025	65	DF	(Turkey) Kadir Subaşı	(Turkey) Ankara Demirspor	Undisclosed	End of season	Academy	
21 August 2025	25	DF	(Denmark) Victor Nelsson	(Italy) Hellas Verona	€650,000 + Add-ons	End of season	First team	
29 August 2025	–	MF	(Turkey) Ali Efe Çördek	(Turkey) Arnavutköy Belediyesi FSK	Undisclosed	End of season	First team	
31 August 2025	24	DF	(Denmark) Elias Jelert	(England) Southampton	€300,000 + Add-ons	End of season	First team	
1 September 2025	22	MF	(Italy) Nicolò Zaniolo	(Italy) Udinese	€2,500,000	End of season	First team	
1 September 2025	26	DF	(Colombia) Carlos Cuesta	(Brazil) Vasco da Gama	€750,000 + Add-ons	31 December 2026	First team	
1 September 2025	–	DF	(Turkey) Ali Yeşilyurt	(Turkey) Yalova FK	Undisclosed	End of season	First team	
11 September 2025	47	MF	(Turkey) İlhami Siraçhan Nas	(Turkey) Kahramanmaraş İstiklal Spor	Undisclosed	End of season	First team	
12 September 2025	50	GK	(Turkey) Jankat Yılmaz	(Turkey) Eyüpspor	Undisclosed	End of season	First team	
12 September 2025	5	MF	(Germany) (Turkey) Eyüp Aydın	(Turkey) Samsunspor	Undisclosed	End of season	First team	
3 February 2026	5	MF	(Germany) (Turkey) Eyüp Aydın	(Turkey) Kasımpaşa	Undisclosed	End of season	First team	
6 February 2026	88	DF	(Turkey) Kazımcan Karataş	(Turkey) İstanbul Başakşehir	Undisclosed	End of season	First team	

== Friendlies ==
Win Draw Loss Fixtures

=== Pre-season ===
12 July 2025 Friendly	Ümraniyespor (Turkey)	2–5	(Turkey) Galatasaray	Istanbul, Turkey
21:30 TRT (UTC+3)	Soukou 11'; Kosoko 64'	Report 1 Report 2 Report 3	Kutlu 7'; Zaniolo 33'; Köhn 59'; Baltacı 69'; Yüzgeç 86'	Stadium: Ümraniye Municipality City Stadium; Attendance: 2,000; Referee: Melih Aldemir

20 July 2025 Summer Series Upper Austria	Galatasaray (Turkey)	2–1	(Austria) Admira Wacker	Linz, Austria
20:30 TRT (UTC+3)	Köhn 10'; Ünyay 57'	Report 1 Report 2 Report 3	Schmidt 58'	Stadium: Raiffeisen Arena; Attendance: 10,000

23 July 2025 Summer Series Upper Austria	Galatasaray (Turkey)	3–1	(Italy) Cagliari	Linz, Austria
20:30 TRT (UTC+3)	Sallai 20'; Yılmaz 30'; Ünyay 58'	Report 1 Report 2 Report 3	Adopo 16'	Stadium: Raiffeisen Arena; Attendance: 8,000; Referee: Sebastian Gishamer

26 July 2025 Friendly	Galatasaray (Turkey)	3–1	(France) RC Strasbourg	Istanbul, Turkey
21:00 TRT (UTC+3)	Sallai 5'; Yılmaz 50', 69'	Report 1 Report 2 Report 3	Luković 81'	Stadium: Rams Park; Attendance: 40,000; Referee: Kadir Sağlam

2 August 2025 Friendly	Galatasaray (Turkey)	2–2	(Italy) Lazio	Istanbul, Turkey
21:00 TRT (UTC+3)	Torreira 10', 74'	Report 1 Report 2 Report 3	Sánchez 33' (o.g.); Zaccagni 45+1'	Stadium: Rams Park; Attendance: 34,748; Referee: Mehmet Türkmen

== Competitions ==
=== Overall record ===
Competition	First match	Last match	Starting round	Final position	Record							
Competition	First match	Last match	Starting round	Final position	Pld	W	D	L	GF	GA	GD	Win %
Süper Lig	8 August 2025	17 May 2026	Matchday 1	Winners	34	24	5	5	77	30	+47	70.59
Turkish Cup	18 December 2025	22 April 2026	Group stage	Quarter-finals	5	4	0	1	8	5	+3	80.00
Turkish Super Cup	5 January 2026	10 January 2026	Semi-finals	Runners-up	2	1	0	1	4	3	+1	50.00
UEFA Champions League	18 September 2025	18 March 2026	League phase	Round of 16	12	5	1	6	17	20	−3	41.67
Total					53	34	6	13	106	58	+48	64.15

Source: Soccerway

=== Süper Lig ===
The Turkish Football Federation (TFF) announced that the 2025–26 season would begin on 8 August 2025 and conclude on 17 May 2026.

==== League table ====
Pos	Team	Pld	W	D	L	GF	GA	GD	Pts	Qualification or relegation
1	Galatasaray (C)	34	24	5	5	77	30	+47	77	Qualification for the Champions League league phase
2	Fenerbahçe	34	21	11	2	77	37	+40	74	Qualification for the Champions League second qualifying round
3	Trabzonspor	34	20	9	5	61	39	+22	69	Qualification for the Europa League play-off round (Note: The 2025–26 Turkish Cup winners qualified for the Europa League play-off round. Since the cup winners (Trabzonspor) qualified based on league position, the Europa League play-off round spot was passed to the third-placed team, the Europa League second round spot was passed to the fourth-placed team, and the Conference League spot was passed to the fifth-placed team.)
4	Beşiktaş	34	17	9	8	59	40	+19	60	Qualification for the Europa League second qualifying round
5	Başakşehir	34	16	9	9	58	35	+23	57	Qualification for the Conference League second qualifying round

Source: Süper Lig
Rules for classification: 1) Points; 2) Head-to-head points; 3) Head-to-head goal difference; 4) Head-to-head goals scored; 5) Goal difference; 6) Goals scored; 7) Play-off.
(Note: Head-to-head record is used only after all the matches between the teams in question have been played)
(C) Champions

==== Results summary ====
Overall								Home						Away					
Pld	W	D	L	GF	GA	GD	Pts	W	D	L	GF	GA	GD	W	D	L	GF	GA	GD
34	24	5	5	77	30	+47	77	13	4	0	46	14	+32	11	1	5	31	16	+15

Source: TFF.org

Pld = Matches played; W = Matches won; D = Matches drawn; L = Matches lost; GF = Goals for; GA = Goals against; GD = Goal difference; Pts = Points

==== Results by round ====
Round	1	2	3	4	5	6	7	8	9	10	11	12	13	14	15	16	17	18	19	20	21	22	23	24	25	26	27	28	29	30	31	32	33	34
Ground	A	H	A	H	A	H	A	H	A	H	H	A	H	A	H	A	H	H	A	H	A	H	A	H	A	H	A	A	H	A	H	A	H	A
Result	W	W	W	W	W	W	W	D	W	W	D	L	W	D	W	W	W	D	W	W	W	W	L	W	W	W	W	L	D	W	W	L	W	L
Position	2	2	1	1	1	1	1	1	1	1	1	1	1	1	1	1	1	1	1	1	1	1	1	1	1	1	1	1	1	1	1	1	1	1
Points	3	6	9	12	15	18	21	22	25	28	29	29	32	33	36	39	42	43	46	49	52	55	55	58	61	64	67	67	68	71	74	74	77	77

Source: TFF.org
A = Away; H = Home; B = Bye; W = Win; D = Draw; L = Loss

==== Score overview ====
Win Draw Loss

Opposition	Home score	Away score	Aggregate score	Double
Alanyaspor	3–1	1–0	4–1	Yes
Antalyaspor	4–2	4–1	8–3	Yes
Başakşehir	3–0	2–1	5–1	Yes
Beşiktaş	1–1	1–0	2–1	No
Çaykur Rizespor	3–1	3–0	6–1	Yes
Eyüpspor	5–1	2–0	7–1	Yes
Fatih Karagümrük	3–0	3–1	6–1	Yes
Fenerbahçe	3–0	1–1	4–1	No
Gaziantep	1–1	3–0	4–1	No
Gençlerbirliği	3–2	2–1	5–3	Yes
Göztepe	3–1	3–1	6–2	Yes
Kasımpaşa	3–0	0–1	3–1	No
Kayserispor	4–0	4–0	8–0	Yes
Kocaelispor	1–1	0–1	1–2	No
Konyaspor	3–1	0–2	3–3	No
Samsunspor	3–2	1–4	4–6	No
Trabzonspor	0–0	1–2	1–2	No

==== Matches ====
The league fixtures were announced on 4 July 2025.

Win Draw Loss Postponed

8 August 2025 1	Gaziantep	0–3	Galatasaray	Gaziantep
21:30 TRT (UTC+3)	Rodrigues (yellow card) 12'; Maxim (yellow card) 41'; Bozan (red card) 65'	Report 1 Report 2 Report 3	Yılmaz 12' (pen.), 45+12' (pen.); Elmalı 16'; Sánchez (yellow card) 41'; Torreira (yellow card) 41'; Lemina (yellow card) 42'; Bardakcı (yellow card) 90+3'	Stadium: Gaziantep Stadium; Attendance: 21,465; Referee: Ali Şansalan; Assistant referees: Bersan Duran, Samet Çiçek; Fourth official: Gürcan Hasova

15 August 2025 2	Galatasaray	3–0	Fatih Karagümrük	Sarıyer
21:30 TRT (UTC+3)	Yılmaz 10'; Kuruçuk 74' (o.g.); Icardi 87'	Report 1 Report 2 Report 3	Doh (red card) 23'; Balkovec (yellow card) 74'	Stadium: Rams Park; Attendance: 46,453; Referee: Ozan Ergün; Assistant referees: Esat Sancaktar, Süleyman Özay; Fourth official: Ali Yılmaz

24 August 2025 3	Kayserispor	0–4	Galatasaray	Kayseri
21:30 TRT (UTC+3)	Sazdağı (yellow card) 45'; Cardoso (yellow card) 76'	Report 1 Report 2 Report 3	Elmalı 36', 46'; Sara (yellow card) 45'; Güvenç (yellow card) 77'; Osimhen 86'; Sané 90+3'	Stadium: Kadir Has Stadium; Attendance: 19,769; Referee: Alper Akarsu; Assistant referees: Deniz Caner Özaral, Mehmet Kısal; Fourth official: Fatih Tokail

30 August 2025 4	Galatasaray	3–1	Çaykur Rizespor	Sarıyer
21:30 TRT (UTC+3)	Sánchez 20'; Osimhen 65'; Sallai (yellow card) 90+1'; Icardi 90+2'	Report 1 Report 2 Report 3	Olawoyin (yellow card) 36'; Aliqulov (yellow card) 53'; Varešanović 73'; Højer (yellow card) 88'; Canpolat (yellow card) 90+3'	Stadium: Rams Park; Attendance: 47,517; Referee: Ali Yılmaz; Assistant referees: Ceyhun Sesigüzel, Mustafa Savranlar; Fourth official: Batuhan Kolak

13 September 2025 5	Eyüpspor	0–2	Galatasaray	Başakşehir
17:00 TRT (UTC+3)	Mujakić (yellow card) 77'; Sešlar (yellow card) 77'; Drăguș (yellow card) 78'	Report 1 Report 2 Report 3	Sánchez (yellow card) 56'; Icardi 72'; Akgün 89'	Stadium: Atatürk Olympic Stadium; Attendance: 11,207; Referee: Batuhan Kolak; Assistant referees: Anıl Usta, Hakan Yemişken; Fourth official: Burak Olcar

22 September 2025 6	Galatasaray	3–1	Konyaspor	Sarıyer
20:00 TRT (UTC+3)	Torreira (yellow card) 4', (goal) 65'; Akgün 22'; Icardi 45+1'	Report 1 Report 2 Report 3	Nayir 81'	Stadium: Rams Park; Attendance: 40,168; Referee: Yasin Kol; Assistant referees: Abdullah Bora Özkara, Bahtiyar Birinci; Fourth official: Yiğit Arslan

26 September 2025 7	Alanyaspor	0–1	Galatasaray	Antalya
20:00 TRT (UTC+3)	Makouta (yellow card) 32'; Aliti (yellow card) 40'	Report 1 Report 2 Report 3	Icardi 22'; Sánchez (yellow card) 62'	Stadium: Alanya Oba Stadium; Attendance: 8,521; Referee: Zorbay Küçük; Assistant referees: İbrahim Çağlar Uyarcan, Mehmet Salih Mazlum; Fourth official: Melih Aldemir

4 October 2025 8	Galatasaray	1–1	Beşiktaş	Sarıyer
20:00 TRT (UTC+3)	Sánchez (red card) 36'; Osimhen (yellow card) 40'; Gündoğan 55'	Report 1 Report 2 Report 3	Abraham 12'; Topçu (yellow card) 40'; Günok (yellow card) 40'; Sazdağı (yellow card) 59'; Uduokhai (yellow card) 80'; Kökçü (yellow card) 90'; Touré (yellow card) 90'	Stadium: Rams Park; Attendance: 51,641; Referee: Yasin Kol; Assistant referees: Abdullah Bora Özkara, Bahtiyar Birinci; Fourth official: Çağdaş Altay

18 October 2025 9	Başakşehir	1–2	Galatasaray	Başakşehir
20:00 TRT (UTC+3)	Harit (yellow card) 23'; Türüç (yellow card) 35'; Shomurodov 59'	Report 1 Report 2 Report 3	Elmalı (yellow card) 15'; Bardakcı (yellow card) 35'; Güvenç (yellow card) 37'; Ayhan (yellow card) 37'; Sané 45+3', 61'; Torreira (yellow card) 48'; Yılmaz (yellow card) 90+2'	Stadium: Başakşehir Fatih Terim Stadium; Attendance: 13,432; Referee: Atilla Karaoğlan; Assistant referees: Mehmet Emin Tuğral, Bersan Duran; Fourth official: Batuhan Kolak

26 October 2025 10	Galatasaray	3–1	Göztepe	Sarıyer
17:00 TRT (UTC+2)	Sánchez (yellow card) 16'; Osimhen 19'; Sara 63'; Icardi 66'	Report 1 Report 2 Report 3	Bekiroğlu 6'; Bokele (yellow card) 30' (yellow-red card) 42'	Stadium: Rams Park; Attendance: 46,069; Referee: Oğuzhan Çakır; Assistant referees: Mehmet Kısal, Candaş Elbil; Fourth official: İlkel Yasin Avcı

1 November 2025 11	Galatasaray	0–0	Trabzonspor	Sarıyer
20:00 TRT (UTC+2)		Report 1 Report 2 Report 3	Bouchouari (red card) 90'; Oulaï (yellow card) 90+3'	Stadium: Rams Park; Attendance: 50,617; Referee: Cihan Aydın; Assistant referees: Deniz Caner Özaral, Mustafa Savranlar; Fourth official: Adnan Deniz Kayatepe

9 November 2025 12	Kocaelispor	1–0	Galatasaray	İzmit
17:00 TRT (UTC+2)	Dijksteel (yellow card) 38'; Agyei 45'; Smolčić (yellow card) 47'	Report 1 Report 2 Report 3	Osimhen (yellow card) 28'	Stadium: Kocaeli Stadium; Attendance: 32,037; Referee: Çağdaş Altay; Assistant referees: Serkan Çimen, Bilal Gölen; Fourth official: Yiğit Arslan

22 November 2025 13	Galatasaray	3–2	Gençlerbirliği	Sarıyer
20:00 TRT (UTC+2)	Karataş (yellow card) 32'; Icardi 55'; Yılmaz 57'; Gündoğan 66', (yellow card) 84'; Sallai (red card) 90+4'	Report 1 Report 2 Report 3	Niang 22'; Thalisson (yellow card) 32' (yellow-red card) 60'; Mimaroğlu 77'; Demir (yellow card) 79'	Stadium: Rams Park; Attendance: 44,556; Referee: Ozan Ergün; Assistant referees: Furkan Ürün, Suat Güz; Fourth official: Erdem Mertoğlu

1 December 2025 14	Fenerbahçe	1–1	Galatasaray	Kadıköy
20:00 TRT (UTC+2)	Semedo (yellow card) 36'; Oosterwolde (yellow card) 54'; Ederson (yellow card) 66'; Durán 90+5'	Report 1 Report 2 Report 3	Sané 27'; Lemina (yellow card) 40'; Yılmaz (yellow card) 63'; Osimhen (yellow card) 71'; Çakır (yellow card) 78'	Stadium: Şükrü Saracoğlu Stadium; Attendance: 44,836; Referee: Yasin Kol; Assistant referees: Abdullah Bora Özkara, Bahtiyar Birinci; Fourth official: Ali Yılmaz

5 December 2025 15	Galatasaray	3–2	Samsunspor	Sarıyer
20:00 TRT (UTC+2)	Sané 8'; Osimhen 29', 90+3'; Kutlu (yellow card) 87'	Report 1 Report 2 Report 3	Musaba 56'; van Drongelen (yellow card) 83'; Kılınç 88', (yellow card) 90+8'	Stadium: Rams Park; Attendance: 40,933; Referee: Mehmet Türkmen; Assistant referees: İbrahim Çağlar Uyarcan, Anıl Usta; Fourth official: Direnç Tonusluoğlu

13 December 2025 16	Antalyaspor	1–4	Galatasaray	Antalya
20:00 TRT (UTC+2)	Giannetti (yellow card) 31'; van de Streek 69'	Report 1 Report 2 Report 3	Sané 7'; Sallai 11'; Osimhen 56', (yellow card) 85'; Karataş (yellow card) 90+3'; Icardi 90+3'	Stadium: Antalya Stadium; Attendance: 17,116; Referee: Ali Yılmaz; Assistant referees: Bersan Duran, Osman Gökhan Bilir; Fourth official: Burak Pakkan

21 December 2025 17	Galatasaray	3–0	Kasımpaşa	Sarıyer
20:00 TRT (UTC+2)	Akgün 9'; Karataş (yellow card) 51'; Torreira (yellow card) 67'; Sara 82'; Icardi 88'	Report 1 Report 2 Report 3	Espinoza (yellow card) 83'	Stadium: Rams Park; Attendance: 34,441; Referee: Alper Akarsu; Assistant referees: Mehmet Salih Mazlum, Suat Güz; Fourth official: Muhammet Ali Meteoğlu

17 January 2026 18	Galatasaray	1–1	Gaziantep	Sarıyer
20:00 TRT (UTC+2)	Yılmaz (yellow card) 53', (goal) 84'; Icardi (yellow card) 78'; Lemina (yellow card) 90+4'; Bardakcı (yellow card) End of the match'	Report 1 Report 2 Report 3	Sangaré (yellow card) 53'; Pérez (yellow card) 69'; Bayo 73'	Stadium: Rams Park; Attendance: 27,471; Referee: Oğuzhan Çakır; Assistant referees: Hakan Yemişken, Bilal Gölen; Fourth official: Yiğit Arslan

24 January 2026 19	Fatih Karagümrük	1–3	Galatasaray	Istanbul
20:00 TRT (UTC+2)	Kalaycı 27'	Report 1 Report 2 Report 3	Sara 1', 51'; Jakobs (yellow card) 23'; Osimhen 55'; Yılmaz (yellow card) 68'	Stadium: Atatürk Olympic Stadium; Attendance: 2,739; Referee: Atilla Karaoğlan; Assistant referees: Ceyhun Sesigüzel, Candaş Elbil; Fourth official: Melih Aldemir

1 February 2026 20	Galatasaray	4–0	Kayserispor	Sarıyer
20:00 TRT (UTC+2)	Opoku 7' (o.g.); Elmalı (yellow card) 21'; Osimhen 26' (pen.); Lemina (yellow card) 34'; Sara 60'; Icardi 90+2' (pen.)	Report 1 Report 2 Report 3	Bayazıt (yellow card) 25'; Civelek (yellow card) 45'; Soyalp (yellow card) 56'; Denswil (yellow card) 67'; Makarov (yellow card) 90+1'	Stadium: Rams Park; Attendance: 45,243; Referee: Adnan Deniz Kayatepe; Assistant referees: Süleyman Özay, Mehmet Kısal; Fourth official: Ayberk Demirbaş

8 February 2026 21	Çaykur Rizespor	0–3	Galatasaray	Rize
17:00 TRT (UTC+2)	Olawoyin (yellow card) 2'	Report 1 Report 2 Report 3	Yılmaz 19'; Osimhen (yellow card) 45+2', (goal) 73'; Akgün 62'	Stadium: Rize City Stadium; Attendance: 13,542; Referee: Ozan Ergün; Assistant referees: Bersan Duran, Suat Güz; Fourth official: Ömer Faruk Gültekin

13 February 2026 22	Galatasaray	5–1	Eyüpspor	Sarıyer
20:00 TRT (UTC+2)	Akgün 2'; Icardi 33', 48', 70'; Onguéné 87' (o.g.)	Report 1 Report 2 Report 3	Özyurt (red card) 38'; İlter (yellow card) 63'; Łęgowski (yellow card) 68'; Altunbaş 71'	Stadium: Rams Park; Attendance: 45,688; Referee: Çağdaş Altay; Assistant referees: Kerem Ersoy, Mücahid Adem Çelebi; Fourth official: Oğuzhan Gökçen

21 February 2026 23	Konyaspor	2–0	Galatasaray	Konya
20:00 TRT (UTC+2)	Boşluk (yellow card) 41'; Türüç (yellow card) 54'; Demirbağ 75'; Kramer 81', (yellow card) 82'; Güngördü (yellow card) 88'	Report 1 Report 2 Report 3	Elmalı (yellow card) 55'; Lemina (yellow card) 78'	Stadium: Konya Metropolitan Municipality Stadium; Attendance: 36,278; Referee: Atilla Karaoğlan; Assistant referees: Furkan Ürün, Samet Çavuş; Fourth official: Ömer Tolga Güldibi

28 February 2026 24	Galatasaray	3–1	Alanyaspor	Sarıyer
20:00 TRT (UTC+2)	Boey 45'; Torreira 58'; Lang (yellow card) 73'; Osimhen 83'; Singo (yellow card) 90+3'	Report 1 Report 2 Report 3	Lima (yellow card) 26'; Mounié 49'; Aliti (yellow card) 55'; Makouta (yellow card) 72'	Stadium: Rams Park; Attendance: 45,424; Referee: Ali Şansalan; Assistant referees: Bersan Duran, Murat Altan; Fourth official: Muhammet Ali Metoğlu

7 March 2026 25	Beşiktaş	0–1	Galatasaray	Istanbul
20:00 TRT (UTC+2)	Kökçü (yellow card) 29'; Murillo (yellow card) 31'; Olaitan (yellow card) 89'	Report 1 Report 2 Report 3	Osimhen (yellow card) 6', (goal) 39'; Sané (yellow card) 28', (red card) 62'; Bardakcı (yellow card); Lemina (yellow card) 77'; Çakır (yellow card) 80'; Sallai (yellow card) 84'; Singo (yellow card) 90+4'	Stadium: Beşiktaş Stadium; Attendance: 41,762; Referee: Ozan Ergün; Assistant referees: Anıl Usta, Mustafa Savranlar; Fourth official: Adnan Deniz Kayatepe

14 March 2026 26	Galatasaray	3–0	Başakşehir	Sarıyer
20:00 TRT (UTC+2)	Singo 57'; Osimhen 66'; Nhaga 85'	Report 1 Report 2 Report 3	Ebosele (yellow card) 28' (yellow-red card) 56'	Stadium: Rams Park; Attendance: 49,411; Referee: Batuhan Kolak; Assistant referees: İbrahim Çağlar Uyarcan, Kerem Ersoy; Fourth official: Reşat Onur Coşkunses

8 April 2026 27	Göztepe	1–3	Galatasaray	İzmir
20:00 TRT (UTC+2)	Juan 50'	Report 1 Report 2 Report 3	Yılmaz 5', (yellow card) 89'; Allan 19' (o.g.); Lemina 75'	Stadium: Gürsel Aksel Stadium; Attendance: 23,035; Referee: Alper Akarsu; Assistant referees: Gökhan Barcın, Esat Sancaktar; Fourth official: Melih Aldemir
Note: It was planned to be played on 18 March 2026, but it was postponed by the Turkish Football Federation due to the match between Galatasaray and Liverpool in the UEFA Champions League Round of 16.

4 April 2026 28	Trabzonspor	2–1	Galatasaray	Trabzon
20:00 TRT (UTC+2)	Onuachu 4'; Tufan (yellow card) 29'; Nwaiwu 63'; Onana (yellow card) 77'; Pina (yellow card) 78'; Çakıroğlu (yellow card) End of the match'	Report 1 Report 2 Report 3	Singo 48'; Yılmaz (yellow card) 51'; Sánchez (yellow card) 63'; Bardakcı (yellow card) 79' (yellow-red card) End of the match'	Stadium: Papara Park; Attendance: 39,664; Referee: Cihan Aydın; Assistant referees: Bersan Duran, Süleyman Özay; Fourth official: Alper Akarsu

12 April 2026 29	Galatasaray	1–1	Kocaelispor	Sarıyer
20:00 TRT (UTC+2)	Sané 30'	Report 1 Report 2 Report 3	Nonge (yellow card) 23'; Petković 72'	Stadium: Rams Park; Attendance: 52,607; Referee: Oğuzhan Çakır; Assistant referees: Ceyhun Sesigüzel, Mehmet Kısal; Fourth official: Direnç Tonusluoğlu

18 April 2026 30	Gençlerbirliği	1–2	Galatasaray	Ankara
20:00 TRT (UTC+2)	Tongya (yellow card) 50'; Niang 67'; Žužek (yellow card) 81'	Report 1 Report 2 Report 3	Icardi 2'; Akgün 35'; Sallai (yellow card) 48'; Çakır (yellow card) 89'	Stadium: Eryaman Stadium; Attendance: 22,921; Referee: Batuhan Kolak; Assistant referees: Furkan Ürün, Osman Gökhan Bilir; Fourth official: Ayberk Demirbaş

26 April 2026 31	Galatasaray	3–0	Fenerbahçe	Sarıyer
20:00 TRT (UTC+2)	Çakır (yellow card) 7'; Osimhen 40', (yellow card) 90+6'; Akgün (yellow card) 40'; Yılmaz 67' (pen.), (yellow card) 67'; Torreira 83', (yellow card) 85'	Report 1 Report 2 Report 3	Oosterwolde (yellow card) 7'; Talisca (penalty missed) 13'; Ederson (yellow card) 23' (yellow-red card) 66'; Brown (yellow card) 23'; Guendouzi (yellow card) 90+3'; Müldür (yellow card) 90+6'	Stadium: Rams Park; Attendance: 53,513; Referee: Yasin Kol; Assistant referees: Abdullah Bora Özkara, Bahtiyar Birinci; Fourth official: Çağdaş Altay

2 May 2026 32	Samsunspor	4–1	Galatasaray	Samsun
20:00 TRT (UTC+2)	Mouandilmadji 22', 71'; Coulibaly (yellow card) 30'; Gönül (yellow card) 34'; Ndiaye 57', 82'; Kayan (yellow card) 75'	Report 1 Report 2 Report 3	Akgün 9'; Güvenç (red card) 63'	Stadium: Samsun 19 Mayıs Stadium; Attendance: 31,134; Referee: Reşat Onur Coşkunses; Assistant referees: Bersan Duran, Hüseyin Aylak; Fourth official: Alper Akarsu

9 May 2026 33	Galatasaray	4–2	Antalyaspor	Sarıyer
20:00 TRT (UTC+2)	Bardakcı (yellow card) 33'; Lemina 56'; Osimhen 66' (pen.), 88', (yellow card) 78'; Lang (yellow card) 90'; Sánchez (yellow card) 90+1'; Ayhan 90+5'	Report 1 Report 2 Report 3	Dikmen 45+3', 62'; Yiğiter (yellow card) 70'; Yeşilyurt (yellow card) 78'; Giannetti (yellow card) 90'	Stadium: Rams Park; Attendance: 50,624; Referee: Çağdaş Altay; Assistant referees: Esat Sancaktar, Bilal Gölen; Fourth official: Ayberk Demirbaş

17 May 2026 34	Kasımpaşa	1–0	Galatasaray	Istanbul
20:00 TRT (UTC+2)	Benedyczak 27'	Report 1 Report 2 Report 3	Singo (yellow card) 90+4'	Stadium: Recep Tayyip Erdoğan Stadium; Referee: Adnan Deniz Kayatepe; Assistant referees: Murat Tuğberk Curbay, Osman Gökhan Bilir; Fourth official: İlker Yasin Avcı

=== Turkish Cup ===
==== Group stage ====
The draw for the group stage was held on 5 December 2025.

Pos	Team	Pld	W	D	L	GF	GA	GD	Pts	Qualification
1	Galatasaray	4	4	0	0	8	3	+5	12	Quarter-finals
2	Trabzonspor	4	3	0	1	13	4	+9	9	Quarter-finals
3	Alanyaspor	4	2	1	1	8	4	+4	7	Quarter-finals
4	Başakşehir	4	2	0	2	8	7	+1	6	
5	Fatih Karagümrük	4	1	2	1	5	6	−1	5	
6	Boluspor	4	0	2	2	1	6	−5	2	
7	İstanbulspor	4	0	2	2	2	9	−7	2	
8	Fethiyespor	4	0	1	3	1	7	−6	1	

Source: TFF.org

18 December 2025 1	Galatasaray	1–0	Başakşehir	Sarıyer
20:30 TRT (UTC+2)	Kutucu 22', (yellow card) 40'; Sallai (yellow card) 27'; Ünyay (yellow card) 79'	Report 1 Report 2 Report 3		Stadium: Rams Park; Attendance: 37,946; Referee: Halil Umut Meler; Assistant referees: Mehmet Emin Tuğral, Esat Sancaktar; Fourth official: Ömer Faruk Turtay

13 January 2026 2	Fethiyespor	1–2	Galatasaray	Fethiye
20:30 TRT (UTC+2)	Ayhan 90'	Report 1 Report 2 Report 3	Icardi (penalty missed) 38'; Bardakcı 73'; Yılmaz 80'	Stadium: Fethiye İlçe Stadium; Attendance: 8,000; Referee: Ayberk Demirbaş; Assistant referees: Erkan Akbulut, Murat Temel; Fourth official: Oğuzhan Gökçen

4 February 2026 3	Galatasaray	3–1	İstanbulspor	Sarıyer
20:30 TRT (UTC+2)	Icardi 5'; Torreira 24'; Kutucu 33'	Report 1 Report 2 Report 3	Mamadou 26'	Stadium: Rams Park; Attendance: 44,853; Referee: Reşat Onur Coşkunses; Assistant referees: Mehmet Şengül, Kerem İlitangil; Fourth official: Mustafa Hakan Belder

3 March 2026 4	Alanyaspor	1–2	Galatasaray	Antalya
20:30 TRT (UTC+2)	Mounié 78'	Report 1 Report 2 Report 3	Yılmaz 6' (pen.); Nhaga 29'	Stadium: Alanya Oba Stadium; Referee: Çağdaş Altay; Assistant referees: Candaş Elbil, Hüseyin Aylak; Fourth official: Alpaslan Şen

==== Quarter-finals ====
The draw for the quarter-finals and semi-finals was held on 11 March 2026.

22 April 2026 Single leg	Galatasaray	0–2	Gençlerbirliği	Sarıyer
20:30 TRT (UTC+3)	Ayhan (yellow card) 3'; Lemina (yellow card) 33'; Akgün (yellow card) 90+4'; Osimhen (yellow card) End of the match'	Report 1 Report 2 Report 3	Üzüm (yellow card) 35', (goal) 51'; Traoré 83'; Erentürk (yellow card) 90+4'	Stadium: Rams Park; Attendance: 48,894; Referee: Oğuzhan Aksu; Assistant referees: Bahtiyar Birinci, Kerem Ersoy; Fourth official: Melih Aldemir

=== Turkish Super Cup ===
5 January 2026 Semi-finals	Galatasaray	4–1	Trabzonspor	Gaziantep
20:30 TRT (UTC+3)	Sara (yellow card) 28'; Yılmaz 38'; Elmalı 45+2'; Akgün 63'; Icardi 81'	Report 1 Report 2 Report 3	Batahov (yellow card) 50'; Augusto 55'; Saatçı (yellow card) 90'	Stadium: Gaziantep Stadium; Attendance: 18,633; Referee: Cihan Aydın; Assistant referees: Anıl Usta, Serkan Çimen; Fourth official: Adnan Deniz Kayatepe

10 January 2026 Final	Galatasaray	0–2	Fenerbahçe	Istanbul
18:45 TRT (UTC+3)	Sánchez (yellow card) 18'; Sallai (yellow card) 33'; Sané (yellow card) 41'; Icardi (yellow card) 82'	Report 1 Report 2 Report 3	Müldür (yellow card) 23'; Guendouzi 28', (yellow card) 79'; Oosterwolde 48', (yellow card) 49'	Stadium: Atatürk Olympic Stadium; Attendance: 58,397; Referee: Halil Umut Meler; Assistant referees: İbrahim Çağlar Uyarcan, Abdullah Bora Özkara; Fourth official: Ozan Ergün

=== UEFA Champions League ===
==== League phase ====
The league phase draw was held on 28 August 2025.

===== League phase table =====
Pos	Team	Pld	W	D	L	GF	GA	GD	Pts	Qualification
18	(Hellenic Football Federation) Olympiacos	8	3	2	3	10	14	−4	11	Advance to knockout phase play-offs (unseeded)
19	(Royal Belgian Football Association) Club Brugge	8	3	1	4	15	17	−2	10	Advance to knockout phase play-offs (unseeded)
20	(Turkish Football Federation) Galatasaray	8	3	1	4	9	11	−2	10	Advance to knockout phase play-offs (unseeded)
21	(French Football Federation) Monaco	8	2	4	2	8	14	−6	10	Advance to knockout phase play-offs (unseeded)
22	(Association of Football Federations of Azerbaijan) Qarabağ	8	3	1	4	13	21	−8	10	Advance to knockout phase play-offs (unseeded)

Source: UEFA
Rules for classification: League phase tiebreakers

===== Results summary =====
Overall								Home						Away					
Pld	W	D	L	GF	GA	GD	Pts	W	D	L	GF	GA	GD	W	D	L	GF	GA	GD
8	3	1	4	9	11	−2	10	2	1	1	5	3	+2	1	0	3	4	8	−4

Last updated: 28 January 2026.
Source: UEFA

===== Results by round =====
Round	1	2	3	4	5	6	7	8
Ground	A	H	H	A	H	A	H	A
Result	L	W	W	W	L	L	D	L
Position	35	21	14	9	14	18	17	20
Points	0	3	6	9	9	9	10	10

Updated to match(es) played on 28 January 2026. Source: UEFA
A = Away; H = Home; W = Win; D = Draw; L = Loss; P = Postponed

===== Matches =====
18 September 2025 1	Eintracht Frankfurt (German Football Association)	5–1	(Turkish Football Federation) Galatasaray	Frankfurt, Germany
21:00 CEST (UTC+2)	Burkardt (yellow card) 5', (goal) 66'; Sánchez 37' (o.g.); Uzun 45+2'; Singo 45+4' (o.g.); Knauff 75'	Report 1 Report 2 Report 2	Akgün 8'	Stadium: Deutsche Bank Park; Attendance: 58,700; Referee: Marco Guida (Italy); Assistant referees: Giorgio Peretti (Italy), Giuseppe Perrotti (Italy); Fourth official: Daniele Chiffi (Italy); Man of the Match: Burkardt

30 September 2025 2	Galatasaray (Turkish Football Federation)	1–0	(The Football Association) Liverpool	Istanbul, Turkey
22:00 TRT (UTC+3)	Osimhen 16' (pen.); Lemina (yellow card) 36'; Bardakcı (yellow card) 61'; Icardi (yellow card) 76'; Jakobs (yellow card) 76'; Çakır (yellow card) 88'	Report 1 Report 2 Report 3	Gravenberch (yellow card) 45+3'; Bradley (yellow card) 73'; Jones (yellow card) 90+1'	Stadium: Rams Park; Attendance: 51,160; Referee: Clément Turpin (France); Assistant referees: Nicolas Danos (France), Benjamin Pages (France); Fourth official: Jérémy Stinat (France); Man of the Match: Osimhen

22 October 2025 3	Galatasaray (Turkish Football Federation)	3–1	(Norwegian Football Federation) Bodø/Glimt	Istanbul, Turkey
19:45 TRT (UTC+3)	Osimhen 3', 33'; Akgün 60'; Jakobs (yellow card) 89'	Report 1 Report 2 Report 3	Bjørkan (yellow card) 51'; Helmersen 75'	Stadium: Rams Park; Attendance: 45,275; Referee: Michael Oliver (England); Assistant referees: Stuart Burt (England), James Mainwaring (England); Fourth official: Andrew Madley (England); Man of the Match: Osimhen

5 November 2025 4	Ajax (Royal Dutch Football Association)	0–3	(Turkish Football Federation) Galatasaray	Amsterdam, Netherlands
21:00 CET (UTC+1)	Mokio (yellow card) 4'; Gaaei (yellow card) 38'; Klaassen (yellow card) 75'; McConnell (yellow card) 85'	Report 1 Report 2 Report 3	Osimhen 59', 66' (pen.), 78' (pen.)	Stadium: Johan Cruyff Arena; Attendance: 51,000; Referee: Benoît Bastien (France); Assistant referees: Hicham Zakrani (France), Aurélien Berthomieu (France); Fourth official: Thomas Léonard (France); Man of the Match: Osimhen

25 November 2025 5	Galatasaray (Turkish Football Federation)	0–1	(Royal Belgian Football Association) Union Saint-Gilloise	Istanbul, Turkey
20:45 TRT (UTC+3)	Gündoğan (yellow card) 13'; Torreira (yellow card) 63'; Sánchez (yellow card) 64'; Ünyay (yellow card) 80' (yellow-red card) 89'	Report 1 Report 2 Report 3	David (yellow card) 36', (goal) 57'; Khalaily (yellow card) 63'	Stadium: Rams Park; Attendance: 45,444; Referee: José María Sánchez Martínez (Spain); Assistant referees: Raúl Cabañero (Spain), Iñigo Prieto (Spain); Fourth official: Alejandro Muñiz Ruiz (Spain); Man of the Match: Zorgane

9 December 2025 6	AS Monaco (French Football Federation)	1–0	(Turkish Football Federation) Galatasaray	Monaco, France
21:00 CET (UTC+1)	Zakaria (penalty missed) 51'; Balogun 68'; Biereth (yellow card) 90+6'	Report 1 Report 2 Report 3	Sánchez (yellow card) 50'; Yılmaz (yellow card) 88'	Stadium: Stade Louis II; Attendance: 9,887; Referee: Danny Makkelie (Netherlands); Assistant referees: Hessel Steegstra (Netherlands), Jan de Vries (Netherlands); Fourth official: Allard Lindhout (Netherlands); Man of the Match: Minamino

21 January 2026 7	Galatasaray (Turkish Football Federation)	1–1	(Royal Spanish Football Federation) Atlético Madrid	Istanbul, Turkey
20:45 TRT (UTC+3)	Llorente 20' (o.g.); Osimhen (yellow card) 29'; Sallai (yellow card) 61'; Lemina (yellow card) 83'	Report 1 Report 2 Report 3	Simeone 4', (yellow card) 67'; Pubill (yellow card) 29'; Almada (yellow card) 41'; Barrios (yellow card) 49'	Stadium: Rams Park; Attendance: 48,443; Referee: István Kovács (Romania); Assistant referees: Mihai Marica (Romania), Ferencz Tunyogi (Romania); Fourth official: Szabolcs Kovacs (Romania); Man of the Match: Simeone

28 January 2026 8	Manchester City (The Football Association)	2–0	(Turkish Football Federation) Galatasaray	Manchester, England
20:00 GMT (UTC+0)	Haaland 11'; Cherki 29'	Report 1 Report 2 Report 3	Lemina (yellow card) 19'	Stadium: Etihad Stadium; Attendance: 35,259; Referee: Alejandro Hernández Hernández (Spain); Assistant referees: Diego Sánchez Rojo (Spain), José Naranjo (Spain); Fourth official: José Luis Munuera Montero (Spain); Man of the Match: Cherki

==== Knockout phase ====
===== Knockout phase play-offs =====
The knockout phase play-offs draw was held on 30 January 2026.

17 February 2026 First leg	Galatasaray (Turkish Football Federation)	5–2	(Italian Football Federation) Juventus	Istanbul, Turkey
20:45 TRT (UTC+3)	Sara 15'; Bardakcı (yellow card) 43'; Lang 49', 75'; Sánchez 60'; Boey 86'	Report 1 Report 2 Report 3	Koopmeiners 16', 32'; Cambiaso (yellow card) 18'; Cabal (yellow card) 59' (yellow-red card) 67'	Stadium: Rams Park; Attendance: 49,977; Referee: Danny Makkelie (Netherlands); Assistant referees: Hessel Steegstra (Netherlands), Jan de Vries (Netherlands); Fourth official: Allard Lindhout (Netherlands); Man of the Match: Sara

25 February 2026 Second leg	Juventus (Italian Football Federation)	3–2 (a.e.t.) (5–7 agg.)	(Turkish Football Federation) Galatasaray	Turin, Italy
21:00 CET (UTC+1)	Kelly (yellow card) 25'; Yıldız (yellow card) 31'; Locatelli 37' (pen.); Pinsoglio (yellow card) 41'; Kelly (red card) 48'; Gatti 70'; McKennie 82'	Report 1 Report 2 Report 3	Osimhen (yellow card) 14', (goal) 105+1'; Sallai (yellow card) 33'; Sara (yellow card) 60'; Çakır (yellow card) 111'; Yılmaz 119'	Stadium: Juventus Stadium; Attendance: 41,421; Referee: João Pinheiro (Portugal); Assistant referees: Bruno Jesus (Portugal), Luciano Maia (Portugal); Fourth official: João Gonçalves (Portugal); Man of the Match: Osimhen

===== Round of 16 =====
The round of 16 draw was held on 27 February 2026.

10 March 2026 First leg	Galatasaray (Turkish Football Federation)	1–0	(England) Liverpool	Istanbul, Turkey
18:45 (20:45 UTC+3)	Lemina 7'; Sánchez (yellow card) 90'	Report 1 Report 2 Report 3	Kerkez (yellow card) 33'; van Dijk (yellow card) 55'; Gravenberch (yellow card) 88'; Szoboszlai (yellow card) 90+5'	Stadium: Rams Park; Attendance: 51,373; Referee: Jesús Gil Manzano (Spain); Assistant referees: Ángel Nevado (Spain), Guadalupe Porras Ayuso (Spain); Fourth official: Juan Martínez Munuera (Spain); Man of the Match: Lemina

18 March 2026 Second leg	Liverpool (England)	4–0 (4–1 agg.)	(Turkish Football Federation) Galatasaray	Liverpool, England
21:00 (20:00 UTC+0)	Szoboszlai 25'; Salah (penalty missed) 45+4', 62'; Ekitike 51'; Gravenberch 53'	Report 1 Report 2 Report 3		Stadium: Anfield; Attendance: 59,980; Referee: Paweł Raczkowski (Poland); Assistant referees: Tomasz Listkiewicz (Poland), Adam Kupsik (Poland); Fourth official: Szymon Marciniak (Poland); Man of the Match: Szoboszlai

== Statistics ==
Italic written players transferred/loaned out during the season.

=== Appearances and goals ===
Includes all competitions for senior teams.

No.	Pos	Nat	Player	Total		Süper Lig		Turkish Cup		Turkish Super Cup		Champions League	
No.	Pos	Nat	Player	Apps	Goals	Apps	Goals	Apps	Goals	Apps	Goals	Apps	Goals
Goalkeepers
1	GK	(Turkey) TUR	Uğurcan Çakır	38	0	25	0	0	0	1	0	12	0
12	GK	(Turkey) TUR	Batuhan Şen	2	0	2	0	0	0	0	0	0	0
19	GK	(Turkey) TUR	Günay Güvenç	16	0	9	0	5	0	1	0	1	0
Defenders
3	DF	(Turkey) TUR	Metehan Baltacı	2	0	2	0	0	0	0	0	0	0
4	DF	(Senegal) SEN	Ismail Jakobs	39	0	25	0	2	0	0	0	12	0
6	DF	(Colombia) COL	Davinson Sánchez	45	2	30	1	2	0	2	0	11	1
17	DF	(Turkey) TUR	Eren Elmalı	41	4	25	3	4	0	2	1	10	0
23	DF	(Turkey) TUR	Kaan Ayhan	29	1	19	1	4	0	2	0	4	0
42	DF	(Turkey) TUR	Abdülkerim Bardakcı	45	1	30	0	2	1	2	0	11	0
64	DF	(Turkey) TUR	Yusuf Dağhan Kahraman	2	0	0	0	2	0	0	0	0	0
90	DF	(Ivory Coast) CIV	Wilfried Singo	29	2	19	2	3	0	0	0	7	0
91	DF	(Turkey) TUR	Arda Ünyay	11	0	8	0	2	0	0	0	1	0
93	DF	(France) FRA	Sacha Boey	17	2	11	1	2	0	0	0	4	1
Midfielders
7	MF	(Hungary) HUN	Roland Sallai	47	1	30	1	3	0	2	0	12	0
8	MF	(Brazil) BRA	Gabriel Sara	43	6	27	5	1	0	2	0	13	1
10	MF	(Germany) GER	Leroy Sané	42	7	28	7	3	0	2	0	9	0
11	MF	(Turkey) TUR	Yunus Akgün	43	10	29	7	3	0	2	1	9	2
20	MF	(Germany) GER	İlkay Gündoğan	38	2	24	2	4	0	2	0	8	0
22	MF	(Colombia) COL	Yáser Asprilla	9	0	7	0	2	0	0	0	0	0
27	MF	(Argentina) ARG	Can Armando Güner	2	0	1	0	1	0	0	0	0	0
33	MF	(Turkey) TUR	Gökdeniz Gürpüz	5	0	1	0	4	0	0	0	0	0
34	MF	(Uruguay) URU	Lucas Torreira	46	4	30	3	2	1	2	0	12	0
53	MF	(Turkey) TUR	Barış Alper Yılmaz	49	12	30	8	5	2	2	1	12	1
68	MF	(Turkey) TUR	Furkan Koçak	1	0	0	0	1	0	0	0	0	0
74	MF	(Guinea-Bissau) GBS	Renato Nhaga	5	2	3	1	2	1	0	0	0	0
77	MF	(Netherlands) NED	Noa Lang	19	2	13	0	2	0	0	0	4	2
99	MF	(Gabon) GAB	Mario Lemina	41	3	27	2	3	0	2	0	9	1
Forwards
9	FW	(Argentina) ARG	Mauro Icardi	47	16	31	14	4	1	2	1	10	0
21	FW	(Turkey) TUR	Ahmed Kutucu	18	2	10	0	5	2	2	0	1	0
45	FW	(Nigeria) NGR	Victor Osimhen	33	22	22	15	1	0	0	0	10	7
62	FW	(Turkey) TUR	Ada Yüzgeç	3	0	1	0	2	0	0	0	0	0
Players transferred/loaned out during the season
5	MF	(Germany) GER	Eyüp Aydın	0	0	0	0	0	0	0	0	0	0
18	MF	(Turkey) TUR	Berkan Kutlu	9	0	7	0	0	0	0	0	2	0
22	MF	(Italy) ITA	Nicolò Zaniolo	4	0	4	0	0	0	0	0	0	0
24	DF	(Denmark) DEN	Elias Jelert	0	0	0	0	0	0	0	0	0	0
25	DF	(Denmark) DEN	Victor Nelsson	0	0	0	0	0	0	0	0	0	0
26	DF	(Colombia) COL	Carlos Cuesta	0	0	0	0	0	0	0	0	0	0
30	MF	(Austria) AUT	Yusuf Demir	3	0	1	0	2	0	0	0	0	0
47	MF	(Turkey) TUR	İlhami Siraçhan Nas	0	0	0	0	0	0	0	0	0	0
50	GK	(Turkey) TUR	Jankat Yılmaz	0	0	0	0	0	0	0	0	0	0
72	DF	(Turkey) TUR	Ali Turap Bülbül	0	0	0	0	0	0	0	0	0	0
83	MF	(Turkey) TUR	Efe Akman	0	0	0	0	0	0	0	0	0	0
88	DF	(Turkey) TUR	Kazımcan Karataş	13	0	8	0	3	0	2	0	0	0

Last updated: 17 May 2026.
Source: FBref.com, Mackolik.com

=== Goalscorers ===
Includes all competitions for senior teams. The list is sorted by squad number when season-total goals are equal. Players with no goals not included in the list.

Rank	No.	Pos	Nat	Name	Süper Lig	Turkish Cup	Turkish Super Cup	Champions League	Total
1	45	FW	(Nigeria)	Victor Osimhen	15	0	0	7	22
2	9	FW	(Argentina)	Mauro Icardi	14	1	1	0	16
3	53	MF	(Turkey)	Barış Alper Yılmaz	8	2	1	1	12
4	11	MF	(Turkey)	Yunus Akgün	7	0	1	2	10
5	10	MF	(Germany)	Leroy Sané	7	0	0	0	7
6	8	MF	(Brazil)	Gabriel Sara	5	0	0	1	6
7	17	DF	(Turkey)	Eren Elmalı	3	0	1	0	4
7	34	MF	(Uruguay)	Lucas Torreira	3	1	0	0	4
8	99	MF	(Gabon)	Mario Lemina	2	0	0	1	3
9	6	DF	(Colombia)	Davinson Sánchez	1	0	0	1	2
9	20	MF	(Germany)	İlkay Gündoğan	2	0	0	0	2
9	21	FW	(Turkey)	Ahmed Kutucu	0	2	0	0	2
9	74	MF	(Guinea-Bissau)	Renato Nhaga	1	1	0	0	2
9	77	MF	(Netherlands)	Noa Lang	0	0	0	2	2
9	90	DF	(Ivory Coast)	Wilfried Singo	2	0	0	0	2
9	93	DF	(France)	Sacha Boey	1	0	0	1	2
10	7	MF	(Hungary)	Roland Sallai	1	0	0	0	1
10	23	DF	(Turkey)	Kaan Ayhan	1	0	0	0	1
10	42	DF	(Turkey)	Abdülkerim Bardakcı	0	1	0	0	1
Own goals					4	0	0	1	5
Totals					77	8	4	17	106

Last updated: 17 May 2026.
Source: FBref.com, Mackolik.com

=== Hat-tricks ===
Player	Against	Result	Date	Competition	Ref
(Nigeria) Victor Osimhen	(Netherlands) Ajax	3–0 (A)	5 November 2025	Champions League	
(Argentina) Mauro Icardi	(Turkey) Eyüpspor	5–1 (H)	13 February 2026	Süper Lig	

(H) – Home; (A) – Away

=== Assists ===
Includes all competitions for senior teams. The list is sorted by squad number when season-total assists are equal. Players with no assists not included in the list.

Rank	No.	Pos	Nat	Name	Süper Lig	Turkish Cup	Turkish Super Cup	Champions League	Total
1	53	MF	(Turkey)	Barış Alper Yılmaz	11	2	0	2	15
2	10	MF	(Germany)	Leroy Sané	5	1	1	2	9
2	11	MF	(Turkey)	Yunus Akgün	9	0	0	0	9
3	45	FW	(Nigeria)	Victor Osimhen	5	0	0	3	8
4	8	MF	(Brazil)	Gabriel Sara	4	0	0	1	5
5	7	MF	(Hungary)	Roland Sallai	3	0	1	0	4
5	20	MF	(Germany)	İlkay Gündoğan	3	1	0	0	4
5	34	MF	(Uruguay)	Lucas Torreira	4	0	0	0	4
6	9	FW	(Argentina)	Mauro Icardi	1	1	1	0	3
6	77	MF	(Netherlands)	Noa Lang	3	0	0	0	3
7	21	FW	(Turkey)	Ahmed Kutucu	1	1	0	0	2
7	88	DF	(Turkey)	Kazımcan Karataş	1	0	1	0	2
7	90	DF	(Ivory Coast)	Wilfried Singo	1	0	0	1	2
7	99	MF	(Gabon)	Mario Lemina	1	0	0	1	2
8	4	DF	(Senegal)	Ismail Jakobs	1	0	0	0	1
8	18	MF	(Turkey)	Berkan Kutlu	1	0	0	0	1
8	22	MF	(Italy)	Nicolò Zaniolo	1	0	0	0	1
8	42	DF	(Turkey)	Abdülkerim Bardakcı	1	0	0	0	1
Totals					56	6	4	10	76

Last updated: 17 May 2026.
Source: FBref.com, Mackolik.com

=== Clean sheets ===
Includes all competitions for senior teams. The list is sorted by squad number when season-total clean sheets are equal. Numbers in parentheses represent games where both goalkeepers participated and both kept a clean sheet; the number in parentheses is awarded to the goalkeeper who was substituted on, whilst a full clean sheet is awarded to the goalkeeper who was on the field at the start of play. Goalkeepers with no clean sheets not included in the list.

Rank	No.	Pos	Nat	Name	Süper Lig	Turkish Cup	Turkish Super Cup	Champions League	Total
1	1	GK	(Turkey)	Uğurcan Çakır	8	0	0	3	11
2	19	GK	(Turkey)	Günay Güvenç	4	1	0	0	5
3	12	GK	(Turkey)	Batuhan Şen	0	0	0	0	0
Totals					12	1	0	3	16

Last updated: 17 May 2026.
Source: FBref.com, Mackolik.com

=== Disciplinary record ===
Includes all competitions for senior teams. The list is sorted by red cards, then yellow cards (and by squad number when total cards are equal). Players with no cards not included in the list.

No.	Pos	Nat	Name	Süper Lig			Turkish Cup			Turkish Super Cup			Champions League			Total		
No.	Pos	Nat	Name	Yellow card	(yellow card) (yellow-red card)	Red card	Yellow card	(yellow card) (yellow-red card)	Red card	Yellow card	(yellow card) (yellow-red card)	Red card	Yellow card	(yellow card) (yellow-red card)	Red card	Yellow card	(yellow card) (yellow-red card)	Red card
1	GK	(Turkey)	Uğurcan Çakır	4	0	0	0	0	0	0	0	0	2	0	0	6	0	0
4	DF	(Senegal)	Ismail Jakobs	1	0	0	0	0	0	0	0	0	2	0	0	3	0	0
6	DF	(Colombia)	Davinson Sánchez	6	0	1	0	0	0	1	0	0	3	0	0	10	0	1
7	MF	(Hungary)	Roland Sallai	3	0	1	1	0	0	1	0	0	2	0	0	7	0	1
8	MF	(Brazil)	Gabriel Sara	1	0	0	0	0	0	1	0	0	1	0	0	3	0	0
9	FW	(Argentina)	Mauro Icardi	1	0	0	0	0	0	1	0	0	1	0	0	3	0	0
10	MF	(Germany)	Leroy Sané	1	0	1	0	0	0	1	0	0	0	0	0	2	0	1
11	MF	(Turkey)	Yunus Akgün	1	0	0	1	0	0	0	0	0	0	0	0	2	0	0
17	DF	(Turkey)	Eren Elmalı	3	0	0	0	0	0	0	0	0	0	0	0	3	0	0
18	MF	(Turkey)	Berkan Kutlu	1	0	0	0	0	0	0	0	0	0	0	0	1	0	0
19	GK	(Turkey)	Günay Güvenç	2	0	1	0	0	0	0	0	0	0	0	0	2	0	1
20	MF	(Germany)	İlkay Gündoğan	1	0	0	0	0	0	0	0	0	1	0	0	2	0	0
21	FW	(Turkey)	Ahmed Kutucu	0	0	0	1	0	0	0	0	0	0	0	0	1	0	0
23	DF	(Turkey)	Kaan Ayhan	1	0	0	1	0	0	0	0	0	0	0	0	2	0	0
34	MF	(Uruguay)	Lucas Torreira	5	0	0	0	0	0	0	0	0	1	0	0	6	0	0
42	DF	(Turkey)	Abdülkerim Bardakcı	5	1	0	0	0	0	0	0	0	2	0	0	7	1	0
45	FW	(Nigeria)	Victor Osimhen	8	0	0	1	0	0	0	0	0	2	0	0	11	0	0
53	MF	(Turkey)	Barış Alper Yılmaz	7	0	0	0	0	0	0	0	0	1	0	0	8	0	0
77	MF	(Netherlands)	Noa Lang	2	0	0	0	0	0	0	0	0	0	0	0	2	0	0
88	DF	(Turkey)	Kazımcan Karataş	3	0	0	0	0	0	0	0	0	0	0	0	3	0	0
90	DF	(Ivory Coast)	Wilfried Singo	3	0	0	0	0	0	0	0	0	0	0	0	3	0	0
91	DF	(Turkey)	Arda Ünyay	0	0	0	1	0	0	0	0	0	0	1	0	1	1	0
99	MF	(Gabon)	Mario Lemina	6	0	0	1	0	0	0	0	0	3	0	0	10	0	0
Totals				65	1	4	7	0	0	5	0	0	21	1	0	98	2	4

Last updated: 17 May 2026.
Source: FBref.com, Mackolik.com

=== Game as captain ===
Includes all competitions for senior teams. The list is sorted by squad number when season-total number of games where a player started as captain are equal. Players with no games started as captain not included in the list.

Rank	No.	Pos	Nat	Name	Süper Lig	Turkish Cup	Turkish Super Cup	Champions League	Total
1	42	DF	(Turkey)	Abdülkerim Bardakcı	19	0	0	9	28
2	9	FW	(Argentina)	Mauro Icardi	12	4	2	1	19
3	11	MF	(Turkey)	Yunus Akgün	1	0	0	1	2
4	20	MF	(Germany)	İlkay Gündoğan	0	0	0	1	1
4	23	DF	(Turkey)	Kaan Ayhan	0	1	0	0	1
4	34	MF	(Uruguay)	Lucas Torreira	1	0	0	0	1
4	53	MF	(Turkey)	Barış Alper Yılmaz	1	0	0	0	1
Totals					34	5	2	12	53

Last updated: 17 May 2026.
Source: FBref.com, Mackolik.com

== Injury record ==
No.	Pos.	Nat.	Name	Type	Status	Source	Match	Inj. Date	Ret. Date
9	FW	(Argentina)	Mauro Icardi	Completely torn ACL; Meniscus tear PLC injury		Galatasaray.org; Galatasaray.org	vs Tottenham Hotspur	7 November 2024	18 July 2025
99	MF	(Gabon)	Mario Lemina	Unknown injury		Galatasaray.org	in training	15 August 2025	27 August 2025
45	FW	(Nigeria)	Victor Osimhen	Sprained ankle		Galatasaray.org	vs Rwanda	6 September 2025	23 September 2025
90	DF	(Ivory Coast)	Wilfried Singo	Hamstring strain		Galatasaray.org	vs Beşiktaş	4 October 2025	31 October 2025
20	MF	(Germany)	İlkay Gündoğan	Hamstring strain		Galatasaray.org	in training	21 October 2025	18 November 2025
11	MF	(Turkey)	Yunus Akgün	Inguinal hernia		Galatasaray.org	vs Trabzonspor	1 November 2025	29 November 2025
23	DF	(Turkey)	Kaan Ayhan	Groin injury		TFF.org; Galatasaray.org	vs Bulgaria	15 November 2025	19 December 2025
42	DF	(Turkey)	Abdülkerim Bardakcı	unknown injury		TFF.org	vs Bulgaria	15 November 2025	19 November 2025
18	MF	(Turkey)	Berkan Kutlu	Hamstring strain		Galatasaray.org	in training	15 November 2025	1 December 2025
45	FW	(Nigeria)	Victor Osimhen	Hamstring strain		Galatasaray.org	vs DR Congo	16 November 2025	28 November 2025
99	MF	(Gabon)	Mario Lemina	muscular problems		Galatasaray.org	vs Gençlerbirliği	22 November 2025	30 November 2025
90	DF	(Ivory Coast)	Wilfried Singo	Hamstring strain		Galatasaray.org	vs Gençlerbirliği	22 November 2025	27 January 2026
4	DF	(Senegal)	Ismail Jakobs	Calf strain		Galatasaray.org	vs Union Saint-Gilloise	25 November 2025	8 December 2025
70	GK	(Turkey)	Enes Emre Büyük	Shoulder injury		Galatasaray.org	in training	1 December 2025	18 May 2026
99	MF	(Gabon)	Mario Lemina	muscular problems		Galatasaray.org	vs Samsunspor	5 December 2025	22 December 2025
1	GK	(Turkey)	Uğurcan Çakır	Hamstring injury		ntvspor.net	vs Monaco	9 December 2025	29 December 2025
18	MF	(Turkey)	Berkan Kutlu	Unknown injury		Galatasaray.org	in training	11 December 2025	5 January 2026
8	MF	(Brazil)	Gabriel Sara	Inner ligament stretch of the knee		Galatasaray.org	in training	12 January 2026	20 January 2026
91	DF	(Turkey)	Arda Ünyay	Hamstring strain		Galatasaray.org	vs Fethiyespor	13 January 2026	14 February 2026
10	MF	(Germany)	Leroy Sané	Torn lateral ankle ligament		Galatasaray.org	vs Manchester City	28 January 2026	12 February 2026
21	FW	(Turkey)	Ahmed Kutucu	Head injury		beinsports.com.tr	vs İstanbulspor	4 February 2026	14 February 2026
45	FW	(Nigeria)	Victor Osimhen	Knee problems		Galatasaray.org	vs Juventus	17 February 2026	23 February 2026
45	FW	(Nigeria)	Victor Osimhen	Forearm fracture		Galatasaray.org; Galatasaray.org	vs Liverpool	18 March 2026	15 April 2026
77	MF	(Netherlands)	Noa Lang	Finger injury		Galatasaray.org; Galatasaray.org	vs Liverpool	18 March 2026	26 March 2026
8	MF	(Brazil)	Gabriel Sara	Inner ligament tear in ankle joint		Galatasaray.org	in training	31 March 2026	7 April 2026
22	MF	(Colombia)	Yáser Asprilla	Edema in the knee		Galatasaray.org	vs Göztepe	8 April 2026	18 May 2026

- Player is injured
- Player has recovered from injury
Last updated: 18 May 2026
Source: Galatasaray Sports Club

== Attendances ==
As of May 09, 2026

Competition	Total	Games	Average
Süper Lig	772,346	17	45,432
Turkish Cup	131,693	3	43,898
Champions League	291,672	6	48,612
Total	1,195,711	26	45,989
