= Ismail Jakobs =

Senegal international footballer (born 1999)

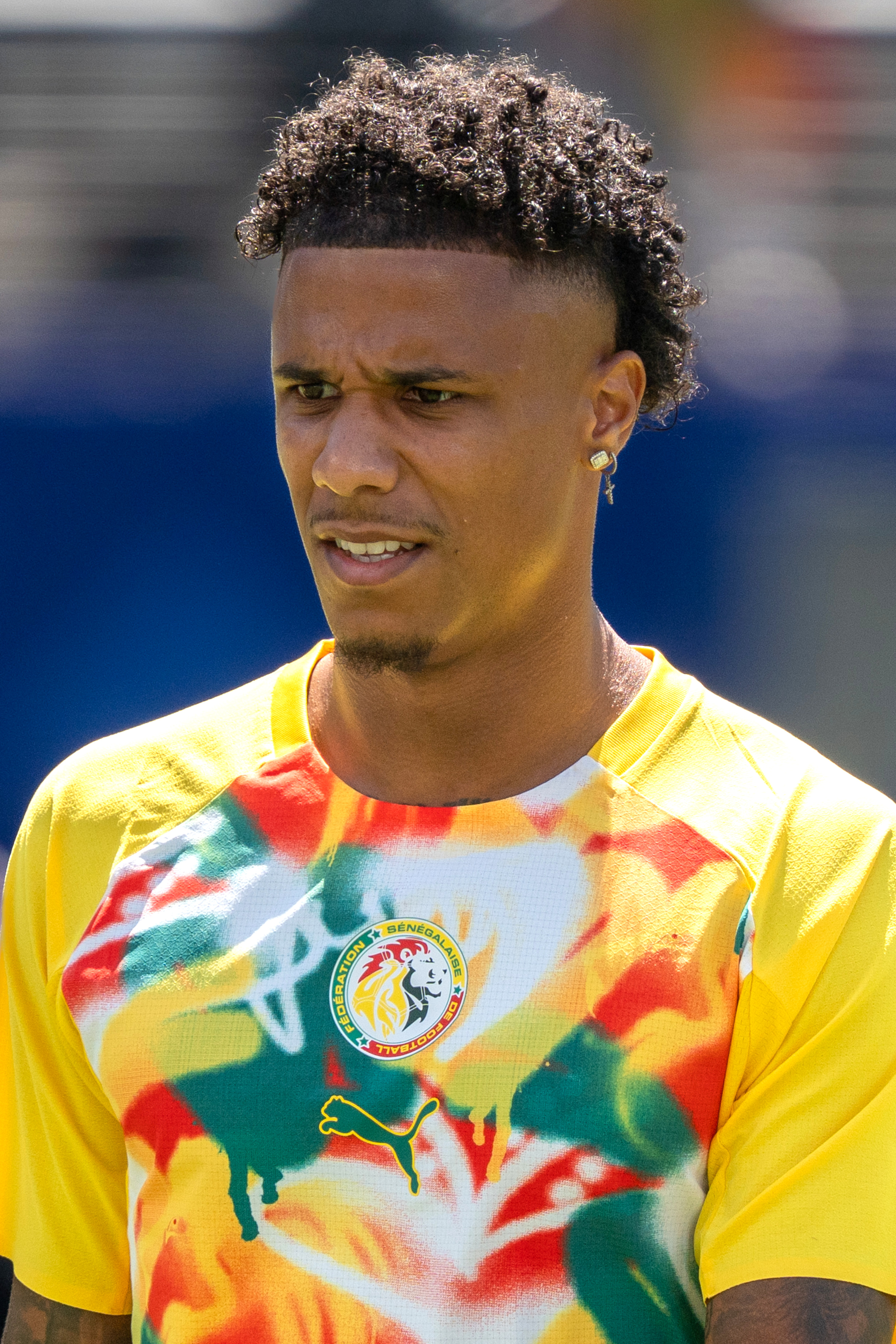
- Jakobs with Senegal in 2026

Personal information
- Full name: Ismail Joshua Jakobs
- Date of birth: 17 August 1999 (age 27)
- Place of birth: Cologne, Germany
- Height: 1.84 m (6 ft 0 in)
- Position: Left-back

Team information
- Current team: Galatasaray
- Number: 4

Youth career
- 2003–2012: BC Bliesheim
- 2012–2018: 1. FC Köln

Senior career*
Years	Team	Apps	(Gls)
2017–2019	1. FC Köln II	28	(3)
2019–2021	1. FC Köln	43	(3)
2021–2025	Monaco	84	(1)
2024–2025	→ Galatasaray (loan)	17	(0)
2025–	Galatasaray	25	(0)

International career^{‡}
2020–2021	Germany U21	9	(0)
2022–2026	Senegal	34	(0)
Medal record
Representing Germany
UEFA European Under-21 Championship
Winner	2021 Hungary-Slovenia
Representing Senegal
Africa Cup of Nations
Runner-up	2025 Morocco
- * Club domestic league appearances and goals as of 23:54, 17 May 2026 (UTC) ‡ National team caps and goals as of 03:54, 29 October 2026 (UTC)

Ismail Joshua Jakobs (born 17 August 1999) is a professional footballer who plays as a left-back for Süper Lig club Galatasaray. Born in Germany, he represented for the Senegal national team.

== Club career ==
=== 1. FC Köln ===
After starting his career at BC Bliesheim, Jakobs joined the youth academy of 1. FC Köln in 2012. In 2017, having progressed through all of the club's youth sides, he was introduced into Köln's U21 team competing in the fourth-tier Regionalliga West.

Ahead of the 2019–20 season Jakobs was promoted to the club's first team by then manager Achim Beierlorzer. On 8 November 2019, he made his debut appearance in a match against TSG Hoffenheim. On 18 December 2019, Jakobs scored his first goal as a professional in a 2–4 victory against Eintracht Frankfurt. In March 2020, the club announced that Jakobs' contract had been extended until 2022. In October of the same year, he signed a further extension keeping him at Köln until July 2024.

=== AS Monaco ===
On 12 July 2021, Jakobs was transferred to Ligue 1 side AS Monaco, where he signed a contract until 2026. He made his debut for the club in a 2–0 win over Sparta Prague in the third qualifying round of the UEFA Champions League on 3 August.

On 7 October 2023, he scored his first goal for Monaco against Stade de Reims during a 3-1 win in Champagne.

=== Galatasaray ===
On 2 September 2024, Jakobs joined Turkish Süper Lig club Galatasaray on loan from Monaco, until the end of the 2024–25 season, with an obligation to buy after.

== International career ==
On 21 August 2020, Jakobs was nominated for Germany's under-21 national team by manager Stefan Kuntz. He was a member of the squad that won the 2021 UEFA European Under-21 Championship.

Jakobs was selected for Germany's squad for the 2020 Summer Olympics, however, following his transfer to Monaco, he pulled out at the club's request.

Jakobs made his debut for the Senegal senior national team in 2022, appearing against Bolivia on 24 September. He played in all four of Senegal's matches at the 2022 FIFA World Cup as the nation reached the round of 16 for the first time since its debut in 2002.

In December 2023, he was named in Senegal's squad for the postponed 2023 Africa Cup of Nations held in the Ivory Coast.

On January 18, 2026, he won the 2025 Africa Cup of Nations with Senegal, defeating Morocco 1–0 after extra time. Two months later, the title was withdrawn from Senegal and awarded to Morocco by forfeit. The CAF sanctioned the Senegalese team for leaving the pitch to protest a refereeing decision before returning a few minutes later.

On May 21, 2026, Jakobs was officially selected by Senegal's coach Pape Thiaw from his list of 28 players to participate in the 2026 FIFA World Cup.

== Personal life ==
Born in Germany, Jakobs is Senegalese and French by his father. His mother is German, and he carries her surname. Jakobs holds Senegalese and French nationalities from his father.

In October 2025, Jakobs attracted criticism after reports emerged that he had travelled to Dubai with Ada Hunca, whom Turkish media identified as his girlfriend. The trip coincided with his absence from the Senegal national team's training camp, which he had initially missed due to an injury reported by Galatasaray. The situation generated controversy after the Senegalese Football Federation requested explanations from the club regarding the defender's absence. Turkish journalist Rasim Ozan Kütahyalı publicly claimed that the player had travelled to Dubai to enjoy a holiday and nightlife instead of joining the national team. Reports of his trip with Hunca were subsequently published by Turkish media outlets.

In May 2026, for the celebration of Galatasaray's 26th Super Lig title, Jakobs was presented alongside his partner, Chareese Amayah Vrij.

== Controversies ==
In June 2023, Jakobs was left out of AS Monaco's squad by manager Philippe Clement after violating the club's internal rules. The incident was reportedly related to his participation in the celebrations surrounding the Monaco Grand Prix, during which he allegedly consumed alcohol. The club decided to sanction him for failing to comply with its collective regulations. The AS Monaco supporters' group Ultra Monaco 1994 published a statement denouncing the lack of professionalism among several first-team players. Among its criticisms, the group accused some footballers of frequenting bars in Monaco and consuming large amounts of alcohol until five o'clock in the morning, despite having training sessions scheduled for 10:30 a.m. The statement did not identify individual players by name, although its publication coincided with the disciplinary action taken against Jakobs and other incidents involving the team's discipline.

In October 2024, Jakobs became involved in a dispute between Galatasaray and the Senegalese Football Federation (FSF) regarding his availability for international fixtures. The club reported that the player was injured and unavailable for national team duty, providing medical examinations to support its position. However, Jakobs played the entire league match against Alanyaspor, prompting dissatisfaction from the Senegalese federation, which formally requested his release to join the national team. The player subsequently travelled to Senegal. The FSF clarified that Jakobs had not been directly involved in the situation.

In October 2025, Jakobs was once again at the centre of a disagreement between Galatasaray and the Senegalese Football Federation. The defender initially failed to report to Senegal's training camp ahead of the 2026 FIFA World Cup qualifying matches against South Sudan and Mauritania. Galatasaray attributed his absence to an injury, although the player had previously featured in matches against Beşiktaş and Liverpool. The federation requested explanations from the club and asked for the player's release so that the national team's medical staff could assess his physical condition. The incident recalled the disagreement between the two institutions in October 2024.

In January 2026, following the Africa Cup of Nations final between Senegal and Morocco, Jakobs sparked controversy by suggesting that three Senegalese footballers may have been poisoned before the match. In an interview, he expressed suspicions of possible deliberate poisoning, although he acknowledged that he could not confirm them with certainty. His comments generated reactions in sports media, particularly due to the tension surrounding the final. The suspicions expressed by the player did not constitute evidence of poisoning.

On 4 November 2026, following Galatasaray's victory over Stuttgart in the UEFA Champions League, Jakobs was spotted alongside Lucas Torreira at a gay nightlife venue in the Etiler district of Istanbul. According to Turkish media, both footballers celebrated the result at the establishment and were photographed leaving the venue. The images attracted attention from sports and entertainment media, particularly after Jakobs attempted to cover his face while leaving the establishment.

== Career statistics ==
=== Club ===
As of match played 17 May 2026

Appearances and goals by club, season and competition
Club	Season	League			National cup (Note: Includes DFB-Pokal, Coupe de France, Turkish Cup)		Europe		Total	
Club	Season	Division	Apps	Goals	Apps	Goals	Apps	Goals	Apps	Goals
1. FC Köln II	2017–18	Regionalliga West	8	0	—		—		8	0
1. FC Köln II	2018–19	Regionalliga West	17	3	—		—		17	3
1. FC Köln II	2019–20	Regionalliga West	3	0	—		—		3	0
1. FC Köln II	Total		28	3	—		—		28	3
1. FC Köln	2019–20	Bundesliga	20	2	0	0	—		20	2
1. FC Köln	2020–21	Bundesliga	23	1	2	1	—		25	2
1. FC Köln	Total		43	3	2	1	—		45	4
Monaco	2021–22	Ligue 1	28	0	5	0	6 (Note: Three appearances in UEFA Champions League, three appearances in UEFA Europa League)	0	39	0
Monaco	2022–23	Ligue 1	32	0	1	0	8 (Note: Two appearances in UEFA Champions League, six appearances in UEFA Europa League)	0	41	0
Monaco	2023–24	Ligue 1	22	1	1	0	—		23	1
Monaco	2024–25	Ligue 1	2	0	—		—		2	0
Monaco	Total		84	1	7	0	14	0	105	1
Galatasaray (loan)	2024–25	Süper Lig	17	0	3	0	3 (Note: Appearances in UEFA Europa League)	0	23	0
Galatasaray	2025–26	Süper Lig	25	0	2	0	12 (Note: Appearances in UEFA Champions League)	0	39	0
Galatasaray	Galatasaray total		42	0	5	0	15	0	62	0
Career total			197	7	14	1	29	0	240	8

=== International ===
As of match played 1 July 2026

Appearances and goals by national team and year
National team	Year	Apps	Goals
Senegal	2022	6	0
Senegal	2023	6	0
Senegal	2024	10	0
Senegal	2025	4	0
Senegal	2026	8	0
Total		34	0

== Honours ==
Galatasaray

- Süper Lig: 2024–25, 2025–26
- Turkish Cup: 2024–25
