= Renato Nhaga =

Bissau-Guinean footballer

Personal information
- Full name: Renato Sam-Na Nhaga
- Date of birth: 27 March 2007 (age 19)
- Place of birth: Bissau, Guinea-Bissau
- Height: 1.72 m (5 ft 8 in)
- Position: Midfielder

Team information
- Current team: Galatasaray
- Number: 74

Youth career
- 2023–2025: Casa Pia

Senior career*
Years	Team	Apps	(Gls)
2025–2026	Casa Pia	21	(2)
2026–	Galatasaray	3	(1)

International career^{‡}
2025–	Guinea-Bissau	11	(1)
- * Club domestic league appearances and goals as of 10 June 2026 ‡ National team caps and goals as of 12 November 2026

Renato Sam-Na Nhaga (born 27 March 2007) is a Bissau-Guinean professional footballer who plays as a midfielder for the Süper Lig side Galatasaray, and the Guinea-Bissau national team.

== Early life ==
Born in Bissau, Nhaga moved to Portugal in 2022 and was originally banned from playing football for administrative reasons. In 2023, he joined the youth academy of Casa Pia.

== Club career ==
On 31 July 2024, Nhaga signed his first professional contract with Casa Pia for 2 seasons. He made his senior and professional debut with Casa Pia as a substitute in a 3–1 Primeira Liga loss to Estoril on 29 April, becoming Casa Pia's youngest debutant ever in the league at 18 years 1 month and 2 days old. On 2 July 2025, he extended his contract with Casa Pia until 2028. Four days later, he was named "Athlete of the Year" at Casa Pia.

On 5 February 2026, he signed a contract with Turkish giant Galatasaray until the end of the 2029–30 season. It was announced that a transfer fee of €6,500,000 will be paid to his club for this transfer.

He scored his first goal for the club on 3 March in a 2–1 win against Alanyaspor in the domestic cup, and scored his first league goal on 14 March in a 3–0 win against Istanbul Başakşehir.

== International career ==
In June 2025, Nhaga was called up to the Guinea-Bissau national team for a set of friendlies.

== Career statistics ==
=== Club ===
As of 13 February 2026

Appearances and goals by club, season and competition
Club	Season	League			National cup (Note: Includes Taça de Portugal)		Continental		Other		Total	
Club	Season	Division	Apps	Goals	Apps	Goals	Apps	Goals	Apps	Goals	Apps	Goals
Casa Pia	2024–25	Primeira Liga	3	0	0	0	–		–		3	0
Casa Pia	2025–26	Primeira Liga	18	2	3	0	–		–		21	2
Casa Pia	Total		21	2	3	0	–		–		24	2
Galatasaray	2025–26	Süper Lig	3	1	0	0	0	0	–		3	1
Career total			23	3	3	0	0	0	0	0	27	3

=== International goals ===
List of international goals scored by Renato Nhaga
No.	Date	Venue	Opponent	Score	Result	Competition
5	12 November 2026	Meknes Honor Stadium, Meknes, Morocco	Madagascar	1–1	1–1	2027 Africa Cup of Nations qualification

== Honours ==
Galatasaray

- Süper Lig: 2025–26
