= Arda Ünyay =

Turkish association football player

Personal information
- Full name: Arda Ünyay
- Date of birth: 18 January 2007 (age 19)
- Place of birth: Ankara, Turkey
- Height: 1.87 m (6 ft 2 in)
- Position: Centre-back

Team information
- Current team: Galatasaray
- Number: 91

Youth career
- 2018–2023: MKE Ankaragücü

Senior career*
Years	Team	Apps	(Gls)
2023–2025	MKE Ankaragücü	5	(0)
2025–	Galatasaray	9	(0)

International career
2022	Turkey U15	2	(0)
2022–2023	Turkey U16	9	(1)
2023–2024	Turkey U17	18	(1)
2024	Turkey U18	7	(1)
2024–	Turkey U19	2	(1)
- * Club domestic league appearances and goals as of 10 June 2026

Arda Ünyay (born 2006) is a Turkish professional footballer who plays as a centre-back for Galatasaray.

== Early life and youth career ==
Ünyay began his footballing journey with the youth academy of MKE Ankaragücü, where he developed into a promising central defender.

== Club career ==
=== MKE Ankaragücü ===
On 2 September 2022, he agreed his first professional contract with Ankaragücü. He made his professional debut for Ankaragücü and earned attention for his solid performance in a match against Pendikspor after coming on as a substitute in the 59th minute due to an injury to Mert Çetin.

=== Galatasaray ===
On 11 February 2025, Ünyay signed with Galatasaray for a reported fee of €500,000. He agreed to a contract lasting until the end of the 2027–28 season.

== Style of play ==
Ünyay plays as a centre-back. and is noted for his defensive positioning, composure, and ability to read the game. Despite his young age, he has demonstrated maturity and leadership on the field.

== Honours ==
Galatasaray

- Süper Lig: 2024–25, 2025–26
- Turkish Cup: 2024–25
