= Ali Turap Bülbül =

Turkish footballer

Personal information
- Date of birth: 25 January 2005 (age 21)
- Place of birth: Düzce, Turkey
- Height: 1.79 m (5 ft 10 in)
- Position: Right-back

Team information
- Current team: Amedspor
- Number: 81

Youth career
- 2016–2023: Galatasaray

Senior career*
Years	Team	Apps	(Gls)
2023–2026	Galatasaray	3	(0)
2024–2026	→ Ümraniyespor (loan)	46	(1)
2026–	Amedspor	3	(0)

International career^{‡}
2019	Turkey U14	2	(0)
2019	Turkey U15	3	(0)
2021–2022	Turkey U17	21	(1)
2022–2023	Turkey U18	3	(0)
2023–2024	Turkey U19	12	(1)
2024	Turkey U20	3	(0)
2025	Turkey U21	2	(0)
- * Club domestic league appearances and goals as of 6 May 2026 ‡ National team caps and goals as of 25 March 2025

Ali Turap Bülbül (born 25 January 2005) is a Turkish professional footballer who plays as a right-back for Süper Lig club Amedspor.

== Club career ==
=== Galatasaray ===
Born in Düzce, Bülbül joined the academy of Galatasaray in 2016. Having progressed through the youth ranks, he was taken on the team's pre-season tour of Austria in 2022, featuring in a number of friendlies.

==== Ümraniyespor (loan) ====
On 13 September 2024, it was announced that he was loaned to Ümraniyespor until the end of the 2024–25 season.

== International career ==
Bülbül has represented Turkey at youth international level.
