= Wilfried Singo =

Ivorian footballer (born 2000)

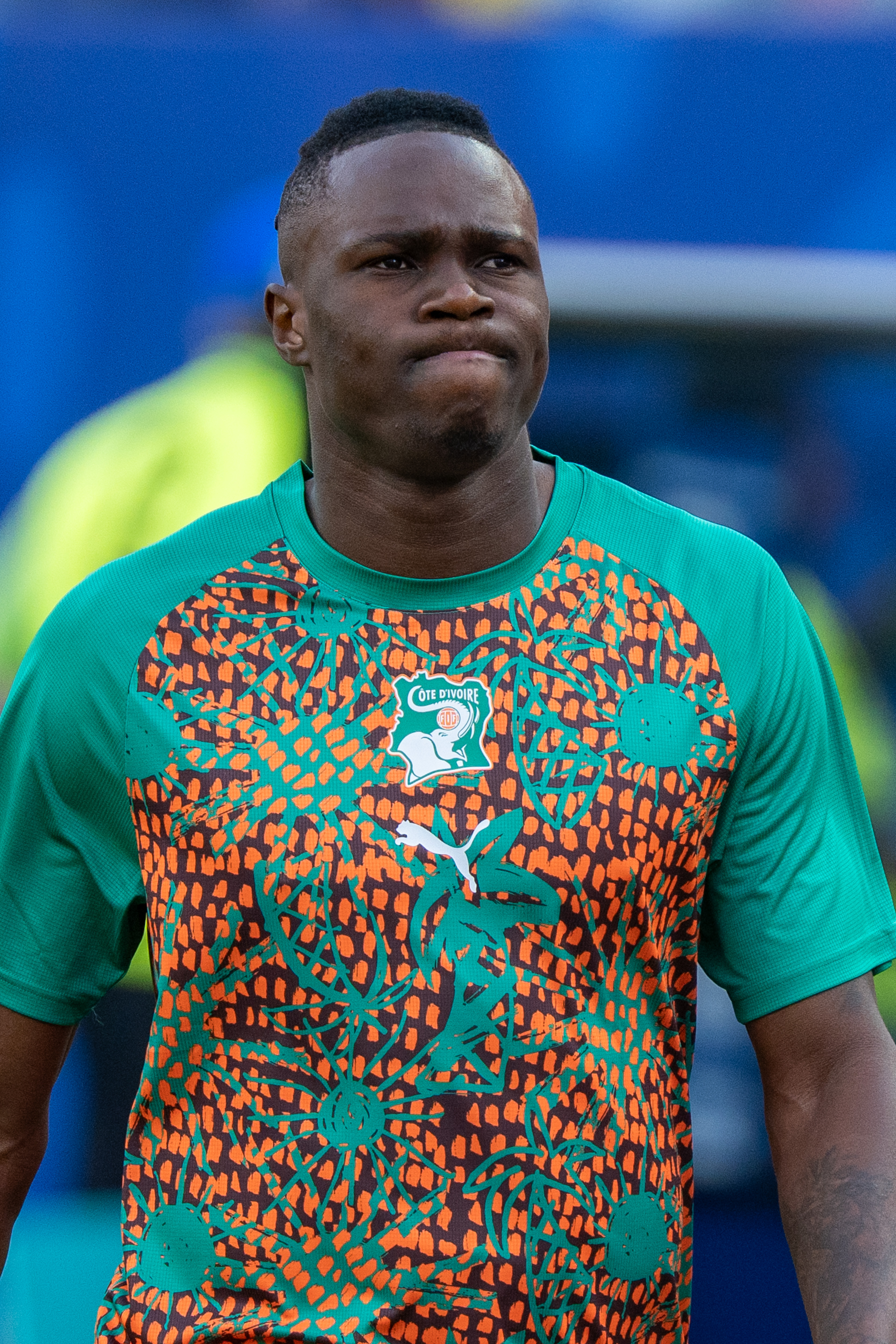
- Singo with the Ivory Coast in 2026

Personal information
- Full name: Wilfried Stephane Singo
- Date of birth: 25 December 2000 (age 25)
- Place of birth: Ouragahio, Ivory Coast
- Height: 1.90 m (6 ft 3 in)
- Position: Defender

Team information
- Current team: Galatasaray
- Number: 90

Youth career
- –2019: Denguélé
- 2019–2020: Torino

Senior career*
Years	Team	Apps	(Gls)
2020–2023	Torino	98	(7)
2023–2025	Monaco	52	(2)
2025–	Galatasaray	19	(2)

International career^{‡}
2018	Ivory Coast U20	2	(1)
2021	Ivory Coast Olympic	4	(0)
2021–	Ivory Coast	36	(1)
Medal record
Representing Ivory Coast
Men's football
Africa Cup of Nations
Winner	2023 Ivory Coast
- * Club domestic league appearances and goals as of 23:52, 17 May 2026 (UTC) ‡ National team caps and goals as of 22:22, 20 June 2026 (UTC)

Wilfried Stephane Singo (born 25 December 2000) is an Ivorian professional footballer who plays as a defender for Süper Lig club Galatasaray and the Ivory Coast national team.

== Club career ==
=== Early career ===
A youth product of Denguélé, Singo joined Torino in the summer of 2019 where he was assigned to the under-19 squad coached by Federico Coppitelli. Initially deployed as a centre back, he was progressively shifted to the right full-back position over the course of the season.

=== Torino ===
On 1 August 2019, Singo made his senior debut with Torino under Walter Mazzarri in a 4–1 UEFA Europa League win over Debreceni. He made his Serie A debut with the club on 27 June 2020, in a 4–2 away loss against Cagliari. In his first start for the club, he scored his first senior goal in the penultimate round of the season at home against Roma.

=== Monaco ===
On 17 August 2023, Singo officially joined Ligue 1 side Monaco for an undisclosed fee, signing a five-year contract with the Monégasque club. On 22 October 2024, he recorded his first Champions League goal and assist in a 5–1 victory over Red Star Belgrade.

=== Galatasaray ===
On 28 August 2025, Singo joined Süper Lig club Galatasaray on a five-year contract, for a reported fee of €30.8 million.

== International career ==
Singo represented the Ivory Coast U20s for 2019 Africa U-20 Cup of Nations qualification matches in 2018. He debuted for the Ivory Coast senior national team in a friendly 2–1 win over Burkina Faso on 5 June 2021.

Singo was a member of the Ivory Coast's squad for the 2020 Summer Olympics, making four appearances as the nation reached the quarter-finals of the Men's football tournament.

In December 2023, Singo was named in the Ivory Coast's squad for the 2023 Africa Cup of Nations and ended up winning the tournament.

On May 15, 2026, Singo was integrated by Ivory Coast coach Emerse Faé in his list of 26 players in order to participate in the 2026 World Cup.

== Style of play ==
Singo primarily plays as a central defender, having previously played as a right-sided wing-back or full-back. He possesses notable pace and strength as well as good individual technique.

== Career statistics ==
=== Club ===
As of match played 17 May 2026

Appearances and goals by club, season and competition
Club	Season	League			National cup (Note: Includes Coppa Italia, Coupe de France, Turkish Cup)		Europe		Total	
Club	Season	Division	Apps	Goals	Apps	Goals	Apps	Goals	Apps	Goals
Torino	2019–20	Serie A	4	1	0	0	3 (Note: Appearances in UEFA Europa League)	0	7	1
Torino	2020–21	Serie A	28	1	2	0	—		30	1
Torino	2021–22	Serie A	35	3	1	0	—		36	3
Torino	2022–23	Serie A	31	2	4	0	—		35	2
Torino	2023–24	Serie A	0	0	1	0	—		1	0
Torino	Total		98	7	8	0	3	0	109	7
Monaco	2023–24	Ligue 1	25	1	0	0	—		25	1
Monaco	2024–25	Ligue 1	27	1	2	0	6 (Note: Appearances in UEFA Champions League)	2	35	3
Monaco	Total		52	2	2	0	6	2	60	4
Galatasaray	2025–26	Süper Lig	19	2	3	0	7	0	29	2
Career total			169	11	13	0	16	2	198	13

=== International ===
As of match played 20 June 2026

Appearances and goals by national team and year
National team	Year	Apps	Goals
Ivory Coast	2021	2	0
Ivory Coast	2022	3	0
Ivory Coast	2023	5	0
Ivory Coast	2024	17	0
Ivory Coast	2025	4	0
Ivory Coast	2026	5	1
Total		36	1

Ivory Coast score listed first, score column indicates score after each Singo goal.

List of international goals scored by Singo
No.	Date	Venue	Opponent	Score	Result	Competition
1	28 March 2026	Stadium MK, Milton Keynes, England	South Korea	4–0	4–0	Friendly

== Honours ==
Galatasaray

- Süper Lig: 2025–26

Ivory Coast

- Africa Cup of Nations: 2023

Individual

- The Athletic Ligue 1 Team of the Season: 2023–24
