= Guadalupe Porras Ayuso =

Spanish football referee (born 1987)

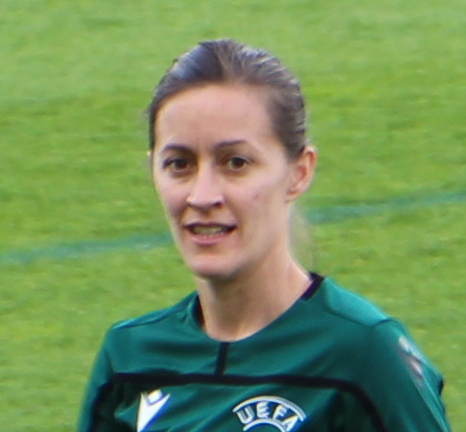
- Full name: Guadalupe Porras Ayuso
- Born: 1987 (age 38–39); Badajoz, Extremadura, Spain
- Other occupation: Former soldier and footballer

Domestic
Years	League	Role
2003–present	Spanish football	Assistant referee

International
Years	League	Role
2014–present	FIFA listed	Assistant referee

Guadalupe Porras Ayuso (born 1987) is a Spanish football assistant referee. In August 2019 she became the first woman to officiate as an assistant referee in La Liga, the top tier of Spanish men's football, and she has since been the first Spanish woman to take part in a Copa del Rey final and in UEFA Europa League, UEFA Champions League and UEFA Europa Conference League matches in the men's game, as well as a regular member of Spain's refereeing teams at major women's international tournaments.

== Early life and playing career ==
Porras Ayuso was born in Badajoz in 1987, although her parents are originally from Orellana la Vieja in the province of Badajoz. Before devoting herself to refereeing she played football as a forward for CF Puebla, in the same province. She was also a soldier in the Spanish Army for nine years, until 2014, when she left the military to focus on refereeing and on completing a degree in primary education; for a time, when she was 19, she combined her work as a soldier with her careers as a footballer and a referee.

== Refereeing career ==
=== Early career ===
Porras Ayuso joined the Extremadura Referees' Committee in 2003, at the age of 16, and made her debut in Tercera División. She spent one season in that category before being promoted to Segunda División B, where she officiated for eight seasons, and then two further seasons in Segunda División. She was added to the FIFA international list in 2014, and was promoted to La Liga for the 2019–20 season, taking over from Marisa Villa, who had earned the category but never made her debut because of the physical fitness requirements.

=== La Liga and Copa del Rey ===
Porras Ayuso made her La Liga debut on 17 August 2019 in RCD Mallorca versus SD Eibar (2–1) at the Estadi Mallorca Son Moix, on the team of referee Mario Melero López, becoming the first woman ever to officiate in the Spanish top flight. In January 2020 she was also the first woman to officiate at a Madrid derby between Real Madrid and Atlético Madrid, as part of Xavier Estrada Fernández's team. In October 2021, in a match between Getafe CF and Real Sociedad, she was part of the first refereeing team in the history of La Liga to be made up of two men and two women, alongside Marta Huerta de Aza, who acted as fourth official.

On 3 April 2021 Porras Ayuso became the first woman to officiate at a Copa del Rey final, working as assistant referee in the 2019–20 final between Athletic Club and Real Sociedad at the Estadio de La Cartuja in Seville, on Estrada Fernández's team alongside Roberto Alonso Fernández. Speaking ahead of the match, she said she hoped the day would come when "we would no longer look at who is on the touchline" and people would be judged purely on their work.

=== European competitions ===
On 29 October 2020 Porras Ayuso became the first Spanish woman to officiate a senior men's international match, working as assistant in the 2020–21 UEFA Europa League group-stage tie between LASK and Ludogorets at the Linzer Stadion in Linz, on Estrada Fernández's team with Roberto Alonso Fernández as the other assistant and José Luis Munuera Montero as fourth official.

On 7 September 2022 she became the first Spanish woman to take part in a men's UEFA Champions League match, serving as assistant in Napoli versus Liverpool at the Stadio Diego Armando Maradona, in an all-Spanish team led by Carlos del Cerro Grande and including Pau Cebrián Devís as the other assistant and César Soto Grado as fourth official.

She was also assistant referee at the 2023 UEFA Europa Conference League final on 7 June 2023 at the Eden Arena in Prague, in which West Ham United defeated Fiorentina 2–1, again on Del Cerro Grande's team with Pau Cebrián Devís and with Jesús Gil Manzano as fourth official.

In January 2026 she officiated as assistant referee in Eintracht Frankfurt versus Tottenham Hotspur in the 2025–26 UEFA Champions League, in an entirely Extremadura-based refereeing team led by Gil Manzano with Ángel Nevado Rodríguez as the other assistant and Fran Hernández Maeso as fourth official. In April 2026 she was named assistant referee in the first leg of the 2025–26 Champions League semi-final between Paris Saint-Germain and Bayern Munich at the Parc des Princes, on the team of Swiss referee Sandro Schärer alongside Nevado Rodríguez, with Gil Manzano as fourth official and Del Cerro Grande as VAR.

=== Women's international tournaments ===
On 6 July 2022 Porras Ayuso was the first Extremadura-born referee to officiate at the opening match of the UEFA Women's Euro, working as assistant in England versus Austria at Old Trafford, with Marta Huerta de Aza as the principal referee. She was subsequently part of Spain's refereeing team at the 2022 FIFA U-20 Women's World Cup in Costa Rica and at the 2024 FIFA U-20 Women's World Cup in Colombia, in both cases alongside Huerta de Aza as principal referee. In 2023 she was also selected for Spain's team at the 2023 FIFA Women's World Cup in Australia and New Zealand.

In 2025 she was appointed by UEFA for UEFA Women's Euro 2025 in Switzerland, again as assistant on Marta Huerta de Aza's team. During the tournament she was assistant referee in the quarter-final between Sweden and England.

=== 2024 injury ===
On 25 February 2024, during a La Liga match between Real Betis and Athletic Club at the Estadio Benito Villamarín, Porras Ayuso collided with a steadycam operator while running back to the centre of the pitch after validating Real Betis's opening goal. She suffered a deep facial cut, had to be replaced by the fourth official and was taken to a hospital in Seville, where the wound was stitched and several tests were carried out before she was discharged later the same day. Porras Ayuso missed more than a month of competition, including a planned appointment at the U-20 Copa Libertadores in Uruguay, before returning to officiate the Cádiz CF versus Granada CF La Liga fixture on 29 March 2024; she required 25 stitches and later said in an interview with the RFEF that she remembered nothing of the play or of the match, describing the experience as "like having had a nightmare", and welcomed the change of protocol on the position of touchline cameras that followed.

== Awards and recognition ==
In November 2019 Porras Ayuso received the Premio Mujeres Progresistas in the women's sport category, awarded by the Federación de Mujeres Progresistas at a ceremony in Madrid; she dedicated the prize "to all those who suffer discrimination".

In March 2025 she was awarded the "Mujeres que rompen" distinction by the Delegation of the Government in Extremadura, together with paralympic athlete Loida Zabala and trade unionists Encarna Chacón and Patrocinio Sánchez, as part of the institutional events for International Women's Day.
