= Lucas Torreira =

Uruguayan footballer (born 1996)

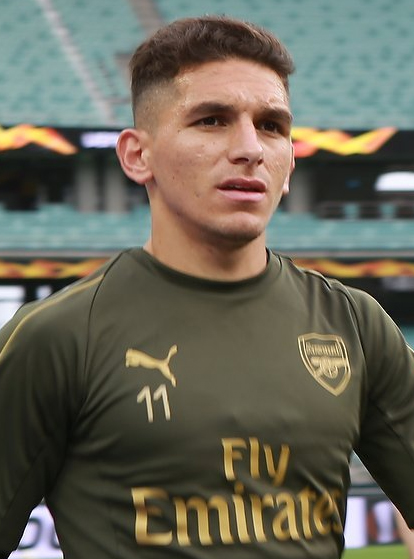
- Torreira with Arsenal in 2019

Personal information
- Full name: Lucas Sebastián Torreira Di Pascua
- Date of birth: 11 February 1996 (age 30)
- Place of birth: Fray Bentos, Uruguay
- Height: 1.66 m (5 ft 5 in)
- Position: Defensive midfielder

Team information
- Current team: Galatasaray
- Number: 34

Youth career
- 2010–2013: 18 de Julio
- 2013: Montevideo Wanderers
- 2013–2014: Pescara

Senior career*
Years	Team	Apps	(Gls)
2014–2015	Pescara	5	(0)
2015–2018	Sampdoria	71	(4)
2015–2016	→ Pescara (loan)	29	(4)
2018–2022	Arsenal	63	(3)
2020–2021	→ Atlético Madrid (loan)	19	(1)
2021–2022	→ Fiorentina (loan)	31	(5)
2022–	Galatasaray	133	(10)

International career^{‡}
2018–	Uruguay	44	(0)
- * Club domestic league appearances and goals as of 23:30, 13 September 2026 (UTC) ‡ National team caps and goals as of 01:30, 14 November 2026 (UTC)

Lucas Sebastián Torreira Di Pascua (Spanish pronunciation: [ˈlukas toˈrejɾa]; born 11 February 1996) is a Uruguayan professional footballer who plays as a defensive midfielder for Süper Lig club Galatasaray and the Uruguay national team.

== Club career ==
=== Early career ===
Torreira started his youth football career at hometown club I.A. 18 de Julio of Fray Bentos. In 2013, at age 16, he joined Montevideo Wanderers' youth team, before moving to Italy where he joined Pescara's youth team in January 2015.

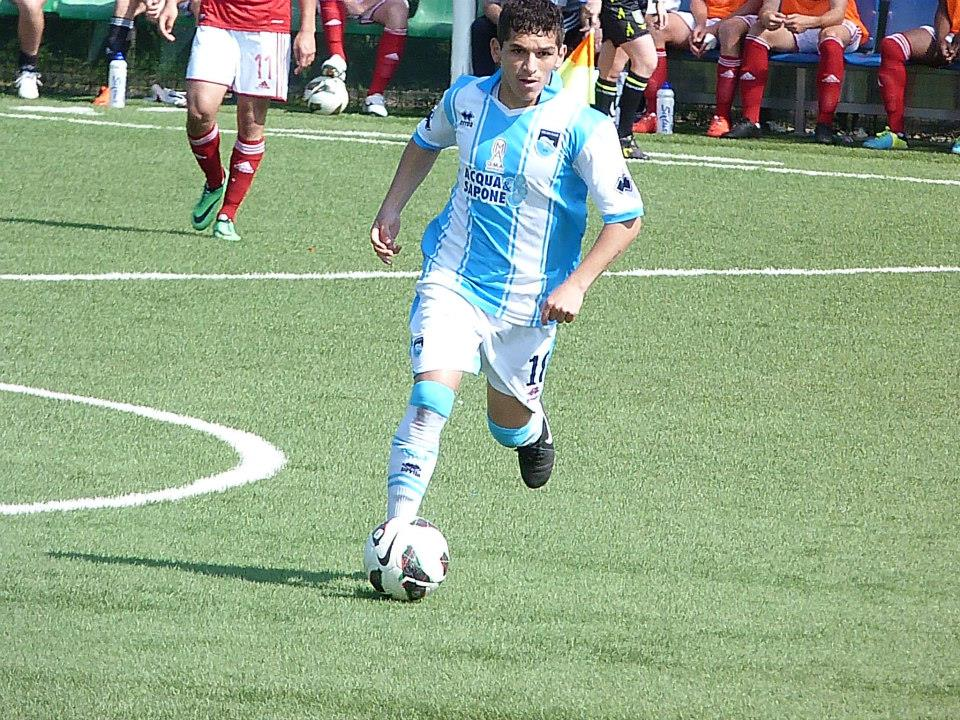
Torreira playing for Pescara in 2014

=== Pescara ===
Before the 2014–15 season, Torreira was called up for Pescara’s first team and, on 25 October 2014, he sat on the bench for the first time. He made his senior debut in Serie B on 16 May 2015 against Varese, playing the game as a starter. He played 58 minutes before being replaced by Matteo Politano.

=== Sampdoria ===
On 1 July 2015, Torreira was transferred to Sampdoria for €1.5 million, but he remained with Pescara on loan for the 2015–16 season to gain first-team experience. On 2 July, his loan to Pescara became official. On 9 August 2015, Torreira scored his first professional goal against F.C. Südtirol in the 2015–16 Coppa Italia.

After the Pescara loan ended, Torreira returned to Sampdoria on 1 July 2016. On 21 August 2016, Torreira made his Serie A debut in their opening game against Empoli at the Stadio Carlo Castellani. He started the game and played the entire match.

He became a regular for Sampdoria in the 2016–17 season, and continued showing his importance to the team in the 2017–18 season; scoring vital goals, including the second goal in Sampdoria's 3–2 win over Juventus in November.

=== Arsenal ===
On 10 July 2018, Torreira joined English club Arsenal for an undisclosed fee, believed to be around £26 million. Torreira was given the number 11 shirt, previously worn by Mesut Özil, who took the vacant number 10 following the departure of Jack Wilshere.

==== 2018–19: Debut season, European runner-up ====
Torreira made his Premier League debut on 12 August, coming on as a substitute on the 70th minute in a 2–0 defeat to Manchester City. Torreira registered his first assist of the season, by setting up Alexandre Lacazette's winning goal in a 3–2 win over Cardiff City. Torreira made his full-debut and his Europa League debut for Arsenal in the 4–2 win over FC Vorskla Poltava on 2 September, before being replaced in the 57th minute by Matteo Guendouzi. Torreira's performance in Arsenal's 1–1 draw with Liverpool drew particularly high praise from fans and pundits alike, picking up the man-of-the-match award. On 2 December, Torreira scored his first Arsenal goal and picked up another man-of-the-match award against Tottenham Hotspur when he latched on to a pass from Pierre-Emerick Aubameyang to slot the ball past Hugo Lloris to give Arsenal a fourth goal in a 4–2 North London derby victory. A week later, on 8 December, Torreira scored a late 83rd-minute winner against Huddersfield Town with a bicycle kick, giving him his second goal in as many games at the Emirates Stadium. In the match, Torreira was also awarded his fifth consecutive Arsenal Man of the Match performance. Torreira was dismissed in stoppage time during the club's reverse fixture against Tottenham at Wembley after a late challenge on Danny Rose. The match ended 1–1 and it was Torreira's first red card for Arsenal; although Arsenal attempted to appeal the ban, their appeal was rejected by the FA, which meant that Torreira's ban would still result in a three-match ban. As a result, Torreira would miss Arsenal's games against Manchester United, Newcastle United and Everton. ESPN's Bill Barnwell named Torreira the third best signing of the Premier League season.

==== 2019–20: FA Cup win ====
Torreira made his first appearance of the season in Arsenal's 2–1 win over Burnley on 17 August. Torreira scored his first goal of the season in Arsenal's 3–1 defeat to Liverpool after replacing Dani Ceballos in the 61st minute. He struggled for playing time early on in the season, but regained a starting position under new Arsenal manager Mikel Arteta. On 2 March, Torreira suffered a presumably season-ending ankle injury in an FA Cup win against Portsmouth. However, the Premier League suspension due to the COVID-19 pandemic gave Torreira enough time to heal and return to fitness by the time the season restarted in June. He played only sparingly for the rest of the season.

==== 2020–21: Loan to Atlético Madrid ====
On 5 October 2020, Torreira joined Atlético Madrid on a season-long loan. On 17 October, Torreira made his debut in a 2–0 win against Celta Vigo in La Liga. On 31 October, he came off the bench and scored his first goal for the club in a 3–1 league win over Osasuna.

==== 2021–22: Loan to Fiorentina ====
On 25 August 2021, Fiorentina announced the signing of Torreira on loan from Arsenal until 30 June 2022 with an option to buy him next summer for around £13 million. On 12 September, Torreira made his debut in Fiorentina's 2–1 win over Atalanta, after being named in Vincenzo Italiano's starting eleven.

=== Galatasaray ===
On 8 August 2022, Torreira signed for Süper Lig club Galatasaray on a four-year contract, for a reported fee of €6 million.

Torreira became Süper Lig champion in the 2022–23 season with Galatasaray. Defeating Ankaragücü 4-1 away in the match played in the 36th week on 30 May 2023, Galatasaray secured the lead with two weeks before the end and won the 23rd championship in its history.

== International career ==
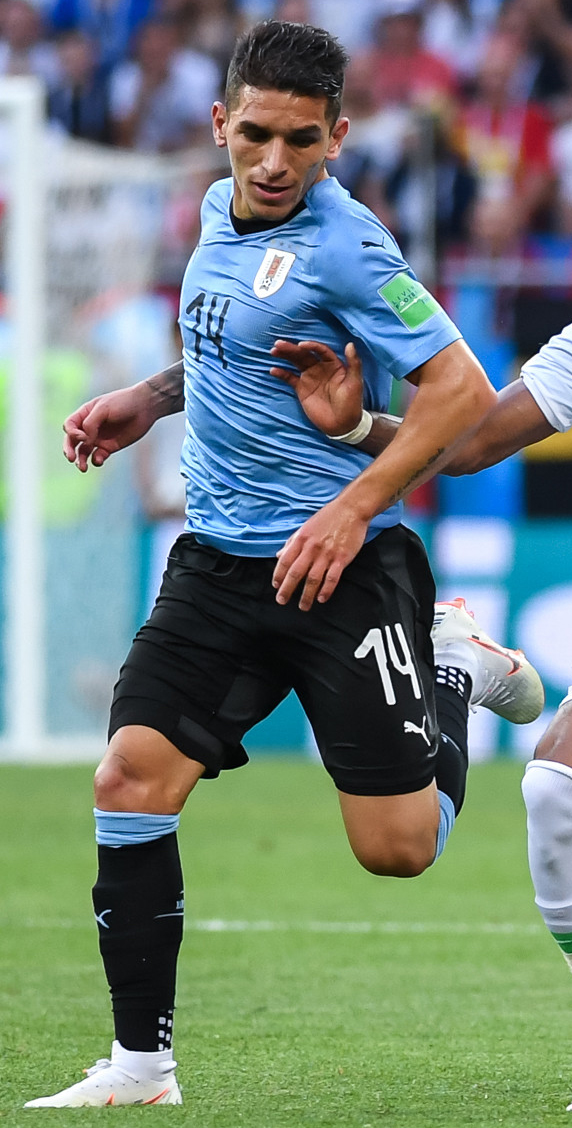
Torreira playing for Uruguay at the 2018 FIFA World Cup

Torreira was born in Uruguay, and is of Spanish descent through his paternal grandfather from Galicia. He holds a Spanish passport, and was scouted by the senior Italy national football team before he was capped by Uruguay.

Torreira was called up to the senior Uruguay squad for the 2018 China Cup in March 2018. He made his debut in the 2–0 win over the Czech Republic in the China Cup semi-final on 23 March.

In June 2018, he was named in Uruguay's final 23-man squad for the 2018 FIFA World Cup in Russia. The tournament served as a breakthrough for Torreira, who played in all five of Uruguay's games.

== Style of play ==
Upon signing for Arsenal in 2018, The Independent's Jack Austin stated "Torreira is exactly the kind of no-nonsense midfielder the club have been craving", adding that in Uruguay colours during the 2018 World Cup "he went about his job as the deep-lying pivot in the middle of the park with none of the fuss and all of the discipline of a player who has built a tidy reputation for himself in Serie A", while assessing his chief weaknesses as a lack of height in aerial duels and little goal threat.

WhoScored notes that Torreira is a player who likes to shoot from distance and often gets fouled. They also note that he likes to play short passes and make tackles.

Atlético Madrid manager, Diego Simeone, praised Torreira for his high work rate and speed on the pitch.

== Career statistics ==
=== Club ===
As of match played 9 May 2026

Appearances and goals by club, season and competition
Club	Season	League			National cup (Note: Includes Coppa Italia, FA Cup, Copa del Rey, Turkish Cup)		League cup (Note: Includes EFL Cup)		Continental		Other		Total	
Club	Season	Division	Apps	Goals	Apps	Goals	Apps	Goals	Apps	Goals	Apps	Goals	Apps	Goals
Pescara	2014–15	Serie B	5	0	0	0	—		—		3 (Note: Appearances in Serie B promotion play-offs)	0	8	0
Pescara (loan)	2015–16	Serie B	29	4	2	1	—		—		3	1	34	6
Sampdoria	2016–17	Serie A	35	0	1	0	—		—		—		36	0
Sampdoria	2017–18	Serie A	36	4	2	0	—		—		—		38	4
Sampdoria	Total		71	4	3	0	0	0	—		—		74	4
Arsenal	2018–19	Premier League	34	2	1	0	3	0	12 (Note: Appearances in UEFA Europa League)	0	—		50	2
Arsenal	2019–20	Premier League	29	1	2	0	2	1	6	0	—		39	2
Arsenal	Total		63	3	3	0	5	1	18	0	—		89	4
Atlético Madrid (loan)	2020–21	La Liga	19	1	2	0	—		5 (Note: Appearances in UEFA Champions League)	0	—		26	1
Fiorentina (loan)	2021–22	Serie A	31	5	4	0	—		—		—		35	5
Galatasaray	2022–23	Süper Lig	31	0	3	0	—		—		—		34	0
Galatasaray	2023–24	Süper Lig	35	1	1	0	—		10 (Note: Eight appearances in UEFA Champions League, two appearances in UEFA Europa League)	0	1 (Note: Appearance(s) in Turkish Super Cup)	0	47	1
Galatasaray	2024–25	Süper Lig	32	5	4	1	—		11 (Note: Two appearances in UEFA Champions League, nine appearances in UEFA Europa League)	0	1	0	48	6
Galatasaray	2025–26	Süper Lig	30	3	2	1	—		12	0	2	0	46	4
Galatasaray	2026–27	Süper Lig	12	2	0	0	—		4	0	0	0	16	2
Galatasaray	Total		140	11	10	2	—		37	0	4	0	191	13
Career total			358	28	24	3	5	2	60	0	10	1	457	33

=== International ===
As of match played 13 November 2026

Appearances and goals by national team and year
National team	Year	Apps	Goals
Uruguay	2018	13	0
Uruguay	2019	10	0
Uruguay	2020	3	0
Uruguay	2021	9	0
Uruguay	2022	5	0
Uruguay	2023	0	0
Uruguay	2024	0	0
Uruguay	2025	0	0
Uruguay	2026	4	0
Total		44	0

== Honours ==
Arsenal

- FA Cup: 2019–20
- UEFA Europa League runner-up: 2018–19

Atletico Madrid

- La Liga: 2020–21

Galatasaray

- Süper Lig: 2022–23, 2023–24, 2024–25, 2025–26
- Turkish Cup: 2024–25
- Turkish Super Cup: 2023

Individual

- Süper Lig Team of the Season: 2022–23, 2023–24, 2024–25
