= Turkey national under-15 football team =

National association football team

Turkey U15
- Nickname: Genç Milliler
- Association: Turkish Football Federation (TFF)
- Confederation: UEFA (Europe)
- Head coach: Tolga Şanbay
- Most caps: Mustafa Beşir (20)
- Top scorer: Melih Bostan (11)
- FIFA code: TUR
First colours	Second colours

First international
- Turkey 1 - 2 Switzerland (Istanbul, Turkey; 10 April 2001)

Biggest win
- Turkey 6 - 0 Montenegro (Istanbul, Turkey; 12 September 2022)

Biggest defeat
- England 5 - 2 Turkey (Staffordshire, England; 17 December 2012)

The Turkey national under-15 football team is the association football team that represents the nation of Turkey at the under-15 level.

Turkey U-15, being a part of the UEFA development programmes, also competes in the UEFA tournaments to give opportunities for elite youth talents.

== Fixtures ==
=== Friendlies ===
26 February 2026	Turkey	3–2	Hungary	Manavgat Atatürk Stadium, Manavgat
13:00	Deniz Demirci 22'; Furkan Bera Kaya 69'; Utku Efe Özkan 88'	Report	Levente Sarok 40'; Milas Farkas 90'	Referee: İbrahim Güner (Turkey)

== Current squad ==
- The following players were called up for the training camp, held between 18 and 27 September 2024.
- Caps and goals correct as of 15 May 2024, after the match against Montenegro.

No.	Pos.	Player	Date of birth (age)	Caps	Goals	Club
	GK	Eren Topaloğlu	6 January 2010 (age 16)	0	0	(Turkish Football Federation) Altınordu
	GK	Toprak Adatepe	26 May 2010 (age 16)	0	0	(Turkish Football Federation) Beşiktaş
	GK	Yağız Ekrem Çaçan	2 December 2010 (age 15)	0	0	(Turkish Football Federation) Galatasaray
	GK	Burak Efe Adıgüzel	24 February 2010 (age 16)	0	0	(Turkish Football Federation) Manisa
	GK	Yiğit Baynazoğlu	23 April 2010 (age 16)	0	0	(Turkish Football Federation) Sivasspor
	DF	Yusuf Sivaslıoğlu	13 March 2010 (age 16)	0	0	(Turkish Football Federation) Altınordu
	DF	Mert Sirkeci	9 November 2010 (age 15)	0	0	(Turkish Football Federation) Antalyaspor
	DF	Emirhan Karabulut	1 June 2010 (age 16)	0	0	(German Football Association) Bayer Leverkusen
	DF	Aras Çelik	22 January 2010 (age 16)	0	0	(Turkish Football Federation) Kayserispor
	DF	Haktan Yılmaz	3 May 2010 (age 16)	0	0	(Turkish Football Federation) Fatih Karagümrük
	DF	Efkan Faruk Kesim		0	0	(German Football Association) FC Ingolstadt
	DF	Rıdvan Harman	15 May 2011 (age 15)	0	0	(Turkish Football Federation) Fenerbahçe
	DF	Yağız Kaan Bilgili	16 March 2010 (age 16)	0	0	(Turkish Football Federation) Galatasaray
	DF	Kaya Kaan Akbulut		0	0	(Swiss Football Association) Grasshopper
	DF	Kuzey Ersoy	24 April 2010 (age 16)	0	0	(Turkish Football Federation) Samsunspor
	MF	Serdar Rüzgâr Kahraman	26 March 2010 (age 16)	0	0	(Turkish Football Federation) Altınordu
	MF	Kağan Hazar	27 January 2010 (age 16)	0	0	(Turkish Football Federation) Altınordu
	MF	Hürkan Aktaş	18 February 2010 (age 16)	0	0	(Turkish Football Federation) Beşiktaş
	MF	Ege Mehmet Özgül		0	0	(German Football Association) FC Ingolstadt
	MF	Arda Aydemir		0	0	(German Football Association) FC Ingolstadt
	MF	Eyüp Çetinkaya	3 March 2010 (age 16)	0	0	(Turkish Football Federation) Fenerbahçe
	MF	Kartal Yiğithan Yılmaz	28 August 2010 (age 16)	0	0	(Turkish Football Federation) Galatasaray
	MF	Diego Leandro Yakın		0	0	(Swiss Football Association) Grasshopper
	MF	Vincenzo Varrese		0	0	(Swiss Football Association) Grasshopper
	MF	Abdulsamet Yıldırım	2 February 2010 (age 16)	0	0	(Turkish Football Federation) Eyüpspor
	MF	Poyraz Efe Koca	31 March 2010 (age 16)	0	0	(Turkish Football Federation) Başakşehir
	MF	Yusuf Koloğlu	18 January 2010 (age 16)	0	0	(Turkish Football Federation) Samsunspor
	MF	Akın Ali Özcan	29 January 2010 (age 16)	0	0	(Royal Dutch Football Association) Vitesse
	FW	Doruk Kadiroğlu	8 November 2010 (age 15)	0	0	(Turkish Football Federation) Altınordu
	FW	Emir Âlim Yılmaz	2 June 2010 (age 16)	0	0	(Turkish Football Federation) Ümraniyespor
	FW	Muhammed Fatih Önkol	26 December 2010 (age 15)	0	0	(Turkish Football Federation) Ümraniyespor
	FW	Serhan İnal	28 March 2010 (age 16)	0	0	(Turkish Football Federation) Fatih Karagümrük
	FW	Nazım Demir Akıncı	23 December 2010 (age 15)	0	0	(Turkish Football Federation) Fenerbahçe
	FW	Arda Karaömer	6 March 2010 (age 16)	0	0	(Turkish Football Federation) Galatasaray
	FW	Mehmet Efe Bozkurt	27 March 2010 (age 16)	0	0	(Turkish Football Federation) Kasımpaşa
	FW	Onur Seferoğlu	15 February 2010 (age 16)	0	0	(Turkish Football Federation) Ankaragücü
	FW	Öztürk Mustafa Nohut	22 March 2010 (age 16)	0	0	(Turkish Football Federation) Trabzonspor
