= 2019–20 Galatasaray S.K. season =

Galatasaray
2019–20 season
- President: Mustafa Cengiz
- Head coach: Fatih Terim
- Stadium: Türk Telekom Stadium
- Süper Lig: 6th
- Turkish Cup: Quarter-finals
- Turkish Super Cup: Winners
- UEFA Champions League: Group stage
- Top goalscorer: League: Radamel Falcao (10); All: Adem Büyük and Radamel Falcao (11 each)
- Highest home attendance: 51,663 vs Fenerbahçe (Süper Lig, 28 September 2019)
- Lowest home attendance: 5,629 vs Tuzlaspor (Turkish Cup, 4 December 2019); 0 vs Beşiktaş (Süper Lig, 15 March 2020)
- Average home league attendance: 35,231
Home colours	Away colours	Third colours

The 2019–20 season was Galatasaray's 116th season in existence and the club's 62nd consecutive season in the top flight of Turkish football. The season covered the period from 1 July 2019 to 24 July 2020.

== Season overview ==
Galatasaray renewed the squad with new signings including Ryan Babel, Adem Büyük, Jimmy Durmaz and the Nigerian youngster Valentine Ozornwafor. Some key players whose loan contracts had ended at the end of the previous season left the club, including Henry Onyekuru and Badou Ndiaye.
The club began its pre-season with the first training and medical tests in Florya on 4 July 2019. The team stayed in Istanbul until 14 July before beginning their Austria camp in Seefeld in Tirol from 17 to 23 July. The pre-season concluded after training sessions in Florya on 24 July.

== Squad information ==
=== First team squad ===
N	Pos.	Nat.	Name	Age	EU	Since	App	Goals	Ends	Transfer fee	Notes
1	GK	(Uruguay)	Fernando Muslera (VC)	40	EU	2011	326	1	2021	€6.75M + Cana	Second nationality: Italian
2	DF	(Turkey)	Şener Özbayraklı	36	Non-EU	2019	0	0	2021	Free	
3	DF	(Turkey)	Emre Taşdemir	31	Non-EU	2019	10	0	2020	Free	
5	DF	(Turkey)	Ahmet Çalık	32	Non-EU	2017	41	3	2021	€2.5M	
6	MF	(Ivory Coast)	Jean Michaël Seri	35	Non-EU	2019	0	0	2020	Free	On loan from Fulham
7	FW	(Turkey)	Adem Büyük	39	Non-EU	2019	0	0	2021	Free	
8	MF	(Turkey)	Selçuk İnan (C)	41	Non-EU	2011	318	59	2020	Free	
9	FW	(Colombia)	Radamel Falcao	40	Non-EU	2019	0	0	2022	Free	
10	MF	(Morocco)	Younès Belhanda	36	EU	2017	70	7	2021	€8M	Second nationality: French
11	FW	(Netherlands)	Ryan Babel	39	EU	2019	0	0	2022	Free	Second nationality: Surinamese
14	DF	(Norway)	Martin Linnes	34	Non-EU	2016	104	5	2021	€2M	
15	DF	(Netherlands)	Ryan Donk	40	EU	2016	83	3	2020	€2.5M	Second nationality: Surinamese
19	MF	(Turkey)	Ömer Bayram	35	EU	2018	20	1	2021	€0.4M	Second nationality: Dutch
20	MF	(Turkey)	Emre Akbaba	33	EU	2018	21	3	2022	€4M	Second nationality: French
21	FW	(Sweden)	Jimmy Durmaz	37	EU	2019	0	0	2022	Free	Second nationality: Turkish
22	DF	(Brazil)	Mariano	40	Non-EU	2017	67	2	2020	€4M	
26	MF	(Turkey)	Mustafa Kapı	24	Non-EU	2017	1	0	2020	Youth system	
27	DF	(Democratic Republic of the Congo)	Christian Luyindama	32	Non-EU	2019	17	2	2022	€5M	
30	MF	(Turkey)	Atalay Babacan	26	Non-EU	2017	2	1	2020	Youth system	
34	GK	(Turkey)	Okan Kocuk	31	Non-EU	2019	0	0	2023	Free	
35	MF	(Turkey)	Yunus Akgün	26	Non-EU	2015	20	1	2020	Youth system	
40	DF	(Turkey)	Gökay Güney	27	Non-EU	2016	6	0	2024	Youth system	
45	DF	(Brazil)	Marcão	30	Non-EU	2019	21	0	2022	€4M	
52	MF	(Turkey)	Celil Yüksel	28	Non-EU	2018	5	0	2020	Youth system	
55	DF	(Japan)	Yuto Nagatomo	40	Non-EU	2017	41	1	2020	€2.5M	
89	MF	(Algeria)	Sofiane Feghouli	36	EU	2017	71	20	2022	€4.25M	Second nationality: French
92	MF	(France)	Steven Nzonzi	37	EU	2019	1	0	2020	Free	On loan from Roma; Second nationality: DR Congo
97	FW	(Turkey)	Emre Mor	29	EU	2019	0	0	2020	€0.6M	On loan from Celta Vigo; Second nationality: Danish

- Last updated: 22 August 2019
- Source: Galatasaray.org, Players in / out, Wikipedia players' articles (for EU passport)
- Ordered by Last season starting 11 and position on pitch (from back right to front left).

== Transfers and loans ==
Due to breach of the UEFA Financial Fair Play Regulations, Galatasaray and UEFA agreed on a settlement lasting until the end of the 2021–22 season. This meant that the club had a calculated restriction on the number of new transfers it could include within the first team squad for the purposes of participation in UEFA club competitions. This calculation was based on the club's net transfer position in each respective registration period covered by the settlement agreement.

=== Transfers in ===
Entry date	Position	No.	Player	From club	Fee	Ref.
1 July 2019	DF	27	(Democratic Republic of the Congo) Christian Luyindama	(Belgium) Standard Liège	€5,000,000	
1 July 2019	MF		(Turkey) Birhan Vatansever	(Turkey) Sancaktepe Belediyespor	Loan return	
1 July 2019	MF		(Turkey) Doğan Can Davas	(Turkey) Bandırmaspor	Loan return	
1 July 2019	FW		(Netherlands) Ryan Babel	(England) Fulham	Free	
1 July 2019	FW		(Turkey) Adem Büyük	(Turkey) Malatyaspor	Free	
1 July 2019	DF		(Nigeria) Valentine Ozornwafor	(Nigeria) Enyimba	€300,000	
2 July 2019	FW		(Sweden) Jimmy Durmaz	(France) Toulouse	Free	
2 July 2019	DF		(Turkey) Şener Özbayraklı	(Turkey) Fenerbahçe	Free	
18 July 2019	GK		(Turkey) Okan Kocuk	(Turkey) Bursaspor	Free	
Total					€5,300,000	

=== Transfers out ===
Exit date	Position	No.	Player	To club	Fee	Ref.
1 July 2019	FW	9	(Switzerland) Eren Derdiyok	(Turkey) Göztepe	Free	
1 July 2019	FW	21	(Nigeria) Henry Onyekuru	(England) Everton	Loan Return	
1 July 2019	FW	11	(Germany) Sinan Gümüş	(Italy) Genoa	Free	
1 July 2019	MF	17	(Senegal) Badou Ndiaye	(England) Stoke City	Loan Return	
1 July 2019	DF	26	(Turkey) Semih Kaya	(Czech Republic) Sparta Prague	Loan Return	
1 July 2019	FW	88	(Turkey) Muğdat Çelik	(Turkey) Gazişehir Gaziantep	Free	
5 July 2019	MF		(Turkey) Birhan Vatansever	(Turkey) Bandırmaspor	Free	
11 July 2019	MF	25	(Brazil) Fernando	(Spain) Sevilla	€4,500,000	
14 July 2019	DF		(Turkey) Emirhan Civelek	(Turkey) Kayserispor	Free	
13 August 2019	FW		(Turkey) Çekdar Orhan	(Turkey) Akhisarspor	Free	
Total					€4,500,000	

=== Loans in ===
Start date	End date	Position	No.	Player	From club	Fee	Ref.
18 July 2019	31 May 2020	MF		(Ivory Coast) Jean Michaël Seri	(England) Fulham	€1,500,000 (Note: Option to buy for €18,000,000 end of the season.)	
2 August 2019	31 May 2020	FW		(Turkey) Emre Mor	(Spain) Celta Vigo	€600,000 (Note: Option to buy for €8,000,000 end of the season.)	
15 August 2019	31 May 2020	MF		(France) Steven Nzonzi	(Italy) Roma	Free (Note: Option to buy for €16,000,000 end of the season.)	

=== Loans out ===
Start date	End date	Position	No.	Player	To club	Fee	Ref.
1 July 2019	31 May 2020	FW		(Turkey) Recep Gül	(Belgium) Westerlo	Free (Note: Option to buy for €80,000 end of the season.)	
12 July 2019	31 May 2020	MF		(Turkey) Doğan Can Davas	(Turkey) Bandırmaspor	Free	
10 August 2019	31 May 2021	GK		(Turkey) İsmail Çipe	(Turkey) Kayserispor	€20,000	
22 August 2019	31 May 2021	FW		(Greece) Kostas Mitroglou	(Netherlands) PSV	€1,250,000	
22 August 2019	31 May 2021	DF		(Nigeria) Valentine Ozornwafor	(Spain) Almería	Undisclosed	

=== Transfer summary ===
Undisclosed fees are not included in the transfer totals.

Expenditure

Summer: ▼€7,400,000

Winter: ▼€0,000,000

Total: ▼€7,400,000

Income

Summer: ▲€4,500,000

Winter: ▲€0,000,000

Total: ▲€4,500,000

Net totals

Summer: ▼€2,900,000

Winter: €0,000,000

Total: ▼€2,900,000

== Statistics ==
=== Squad appearances and goals ===
Last updated on 25 May 2019.

No.	Pos	Nat	Player	Total		Süper Lig		Champions League		Turkish Cup		Super Cup	
No.	Pos	Nat	Player	Apps	Goals	Apps	Goals	Apps	Goals	Apps	Goals	Apps	Goals
Goalkeepers
Defenders
Midfielders
Forwards

=== Squad statistics ===
	League	Europe	Cup	Others	Total
Games played	-	-	-	-	-
Games won	-	-	-	-	-
Games drawn	-	-	-	-	-
Games lost	-	-	-	-	-
Goals scored	-	-	-	-	-
Goals conceded	-	-	-	-	-
Goal difference	-	-	-	-	-
Clean sheets	-	-	-	-	-
Goal by Substitute	-	-	-	-	-
Total shots	–	–	–	–	–
Shots on target	–	–	–	–	–
Corners	–	–	–	–	–
Players used	–	–	–	–	–
Offsides	–	–	–	–	–
Fouls suffered	–	–	–	–	–
Fouls committed	–	–	–	–	–
Yellow cards	-	-	-	-	-
Red cards	-	-	-	-	-

Last updated: 25 May 2019

=== Goalscorers ===
No.	Pos.	Nation	Name	Süper Lig	Champions League	Turkish Cup	Super Cup	Total
TOTAL				-	-	-	-	-

As of match played 25 May 2019.

=== Disciplinary record ===
N	P	Nat.	Name	Süper Lig			Champions League			Turkish Cup			Super Cup			Total			Notes
N	P	Nat.	Name	Yellow card	Second yellow card	Red card	Yellow card	Second yellow card	Red card	Yellow card	Second yellow card	Red card	Yellow card	Second yellow card	Red card	Yellow card	Second yellow card	Red card	Notes

Last updated: 25 May 2019
Source: NTVspor.net
Ordered by (red card) , (second yellow card) and (yellow card)
(yellow card) = Number of bookings; (second yellow card) = Number of sending offs after a second yellow card; (red card) = Number of sending offs by a direct red card.

== Pre-season and friendlies ==
Win Draw Loss

19 July 2019 Pre-season	RB Leipzig (Germany)	3–2	(Turkey) Galatasaray	Innsbruck
18:00 CEST	Halstenberg 57'; Poulsen 58'; Augustin 59'; Cândido (yellow card) 84'; Cunha (yellow card) 85'	Report	Babel 28', 89'; Çalık (yellow card) 34'; Donk (yellow card) 55'	Stadium: Tivoli-Neu; Referee: Felix Ouschan (Austria)

25 July 2019 Pre-season	FC Augsburg (Germany)	4–1	(Turkey) Galatasaray	Innsbruck
19:00 CEST	Niederlechner 14'; Gruezo 31'; Hahn 53'; Russo 54'	Report	Bayram 87'	Stadium: Tivoli-Neu

28 July 2019 Pre-season	Bordeaux (France)	1–3	(Turkey) Galatasaray	Innsbruck
16:30 CEST	Kalu 74'	Report	Babel 7'; Babacan 45'; Büyük 67'; Donk (yellow card) 84'	Stadium: Tivoli-Neu; Referee: Stefan Ebner (Austria)

3 August 2019 Pre-season	Galatasaray (Turkey)	2–1	(Greece) Panathinaikos	Istanbul
21:00 TRT	Büyük 11'; Nagatomo (yellow card) 34'; Donk 61'	Report	Insúa (yellow card) 13'; Johansson (yellow card) 45+3'; Poungouras (yellow card) 59'; Nunes (yellow card) 69'; Alexandropoulos (yellow card) 87'; Konan 90+2'	Stadium: Türk Telekom Stadium; Referee: Atilla Karaoğlan (Turkey)

11 August 2019 Pre-season	Fiorentina (Italy)	4–1	(Turkey) Galatasaray	Florence
21:00 CEST	Boateng 42' (pen.); Sottil 45+3'; Castrovilli (yellow card) 55'; Biraghi (yellow card) 59'; Benassi 61'; Simeone 83'	Report	Marcão (yellow card) 22'; Mor 50'	Stadium: Stadio Artemio Franchi; Referee: Rosario Abisso (Italy)

12 October 2019 Friendly	Galatasaray (Turkey)	3–2	(Turkey) İstanbulspor	Istanbul
12:00 TRT	Durmaz 18'; Antalyalı 20'; Mor 38'	Report	Diouf 4'; Yalçın 81' (pen.)	Stadium: Florya Metin Oktay Facilities

16 November 2019 Friendly	Galatasaray (Turkey)	4–0	(Turkey) Ümraniyespor	Istanbul
12:00 TRT	Durmaz 1'; İnan 46'; Mor 56'; Büyük 84' (pen.)	Report		Stadium: Florya Metin Oktay Facilities

10 January 2020 Friendly	Galatasaray (Turkey)	3–1	(Turkey) Altay	Belek
16:05 TRT	Falcao 9' (pen.); Donk (yellow card) 14'; Belhanda 52'; Akbaba 62'; Durmaz (yellow card) 84'	Report	Alhassan (yellow card) 18'; Demirci 72'	Stadium: Sueno Sports Center - Pitch 1

11 January 2020 Friendly	Galatasaray (Turkey)	1–0	(Turkey) Adana Demirspor	Belek
18:05 TRT	Feghouli 7'	Report	Mitrović (yellow card) 79'	Stadium: Sueno Sports Center - Pitch 1

== Competitions ==
Win Draw Loss

=== Overview ===
Competition	First match	Last match	Starting round	Final position	Record							
Competition	First match	Last match	Starting round	Final position	Pld	W	D	L	GF	GA	GD	Win %
Süper Lig	16 August 2019	24 July 2020	Matchday 1	6th	34	15	11	8	55	37	+18	44.12
Turkish Cup	4 December 2019	12 February 2020	Fifth round	Quarter-finals	6	3	1	2	10	7	+3	50.00
Turkish Super Cup	7 August 2019	7 August 2019	Final	Winners	1	1	0	0	1	0	+1	100.00
Champions League	18 September 2019	11 December 2019	Group stage	Group stage	6	0	2	4	1	14	−13	0.00
Total					47	19	14	14	67	58	+9	40.43

Source: Competitions

=== Süper Lig ===
==== Standings ====
Pos	Team	Pld	W	D	L	GF	GA	GD	Pts	Qualification or relegation
4	Sivasspor	34	17	9	8	55	38	+17	60	Qualification for the Europa League group stage
5	Alanyaspor	34	16	9	9	61	37	+24	57	Qualification for the Europa League third qualifying round
6	Galatasaray	34	15	11	8	55	37	+18	56	Qualification for the Europa League second qualifying round
7	Fenerbahçe	34	15	8	11	58	46	+12	53	
8	Gaziantep	34	11	13	10	49	50	−1	46	

Source: Süper Lig, Soccerway
Rules for classification: 1) Points; 2) Head-to-head points; 3) Head-to-head goal difference; 4) Head-to-head goals scored; 5) Goal difference; 6) Goals scored; 7) Play-off.

==== Results summary ====
Overall								Home						Away					
Pld	W	D	L	GF	GA	GD	Pts	W	D	L	GF	GA	GD	W	D	L	GF	GA	GD
34	15	11	8	55	37	+18	56	10	5	2	32	15	+17	5	6	6	23	22	+1

==== Results by round ====
Round	1	2	3	4	5	6	7	8	9	10	11	12	13	14	15	16	17	18	19	20	21	22	23	24	25	26	27	28	29	30	31	32	33	34
Ground	A	H	A	H	A	H	A	H	A	H	A	H	A	H	H	A	H	H	A	H	A	H	A	H	A	H	A	H	A	H	A	A	H	A
Result	L	D	W	W	D	D	D	W	L	W	W	L	D	W	D	L	W	W	W	W	W	W	W	W	D	D	L	D	D	L	L	L	W	D
Position	15	14	9	5	7	7	10	6	7	7	6	8	8	6	6	7	7	6	6	6	5	3	3	3	3	3	4	4	4	4	5	5	5	6

Source: Süper Lig
A = Away; H = Home; W = Win; D = Draw; L = Loss

==== Matches ====
16 August 2019 1	Denizlispor	2–0	Galatasaray	Denizli
20:30 TRT	Niyaz 75'; Rodallega 90+4'	Report		Stadium: Denizli Atatürk Stadium; Attendance: 13,666; Referee: Abdulkadir Bitigen

25 August 2019 2	Galatasaray	1–1	Konyaspor	Istanbul
21:45 TRT	Babel 60'	Report	Jønsson 90+6'	Stadium: Türk Telekom Stadı; Attendance: 38,445; Referee: Mete Kalkavan

30 August 2019 3	Kayserispor	2–3	Galatasaray	Kayseri
20:30 TRT	Pedro Henrique 37'; Bulut 90+1'	Report	Belhanda 66' (pen.); Babel 87'; Büyük 90+9'	Stadium: Kadir Has Stadium; Attendance: 20,034; Referee: Mustafa Öğretmenoğlu

13 September 2019 4	Galatasaray	1–0	Kasımpaşa	Istanbul
19:30 TRT	Falcao 38'	Report		Stadium: Türk Telekom Stadı; Attendance: 43,475; Referee: Ali Palabıyık

22 September 2019 5	Yeni Malatyaspor	1–1	Galatasaray	Malatya
19:00 TRT	Guilherme 88'	Report	Seri 23'	Stadium: Malatya Arena; Attendance: 16,463; Referee: Arda Kardeşler

28 September 2019 6	Galatasaray	0–0	Fenerbahçe	Istanbul
20:00 TRT		Report		Stadium: Türk Telekom Stadı; Attendance: 51,663; Referee: Cüneyt Çakır

5 October 2019 7	Gençlerbirliği	0–0	Galatasaray	Ankara
20:00 TRT		Report		Stadium: Eryaman Stadium; Attendance: 10,275; Referee: Halil Umut Meler

18 October 2019 8	Galatasaray	3–2	Sivasspor	Istanbul
20:30 TRT	Andone 21', 42' (pen.); Babel 74'	Report	Koné 69'; Yesilyurt 84'	Stadium: Türk Telekom Stadı; Attendance: 35,315; Referee: Ali Palabıyık

27 October 2019 9	Beşiktaş	1–0	Galatasaray	Istanbul
19:00 TRT	Nayir 69'	Report		Stadium: Vodafone Park; Attendance: 35,791; Referee: Mete Kalkavan

1 November 2019 10	Galatasaray	2–0	Çaykur Rizespor	Istanbul
20:30 TRT	Talbi 15' (o.g.); Babel 18' (pen.)	Report		Stadium: Türk Telekom Stadı; Attendance: 29,861; Referee: Abdulkadir Bitigen

9 November 2019 11	Gaziantep FK	0–2	Galatasaray	Gaziantep
20:00 TRT		Report	Bayram 21'; Feghouli 43'	Stadium: New Gaziantep Stadium; Attendance: 15,648; Referee: Cüneyt Çakır

22 November 2019 12	Galatasaray	0–1	İstanbul Başakşehir	Istanbul
20:30 TRT		Report	Gulbrandsen 78'	Stadium: Türk Telekom Stadı; Attendance: 35,650; Referee: Yaşar Kemal Uğurlu

1 December 2019 13	Trabzonspor	1–1	Galatasaray	Trabzon
19:00 TRT	Sørloth 50'	Report	Nagatomo 90'	Stadium: Medical Park Stadyumu; Attendance: 37,260; Referee: Ali Palabıyık

7 December 2019 14	Galatasaray	1–0	Alanyaspor	Istanbul
20:00 TRT	Belhanda 20' (pen.)	Report		Stadium: Türk Telekom Stadı; Attendance: 28,460; Referee: Halil Umut Meler

14 December 2019 15	Galatasaray	2–2	Ankaragücü	Istanbul
20:00 TRT	Feghouli 53'; Belhanda 83' (pen.)	Report	Parlak 88' (pen.); Kitsiou 90+1'	Stadium: Türk Telekom Stadı; Attendance: 28,328; Referee: Ali Şansalan

21 December 2019 16	Göztepe	2–1	Galatasaray	İzmir
20:00 TRT	Jerome 9'; Akbunar 61'	Report	Gassama 27' (o.g.)	Stadium: Doğanlar Stadium; Attendance: 8,784; Referee: Serkan Tokat

28 December 2019 17	Galatasaray	5–0	Antalyaspor	Istanbul
20:00 TRT	Falcao 10' (pen.), 28'; Čelůstka 37' (o.g.); Babel 82'; Antalyalı 89'	Report		Stadium: Türk Telekom Stadı; Attendance: 25,344; Referee: Abdulkadir Bitigen

19 January 2020 18	Galatasaray	2–1	Denizlispor	Istanbul
16:00 TRT	Akbaba 26'; Falcao 57'	Report	Özkal 64'	Stadium: Türk Telekom Stadı; Attendance: 32,996; Referee: Yaşar Kemal Uğurlu

26 January 2020 19	Konyaspor	0–3	Galatasaray	Konya
19:00 TRT		Report	Falcao 26'; Akbaba 39'; Büyük 79'	Stadium: Konya Büyükşehir Stadı; Attendance: 26,081; Referee: Koray Gençerler

2 February 2020 20	Galatasaray	4–1	Kayserispor	Istanbul
19:00 TRT	Büyük 5'; Donk 21'; Feghouli 64', 90+4'	Report	Mešanović 69'	Stadium: Türk Telekom Stadı; Attendance: 32,876; Referee: Zorbay Küçük

9 February 2020 21	Kasımpaşa	0–3	Galatasaray	Istanbul
19:00 TRT		Report	Meriah 7' (o.g.); Büyük 22' (pen.), 41'	Stadium: Recep Tayyip Erdoğan Stadı; Attendance: 4,950; Referee: Mete Kalkavan

16 February 2020 22	Galatasaray	1–0	Yeni Malatyaspor	Istanbul
19:00 TRT	Büyük 45' (pen.)	Report		Stadium: Türk Telekom Stadı; Attendance: 36,553; Referee: Alper Ulusoy

23 February 2020 23	Fenerbahçe	1–3	Galatasaray	Istanbul
19:00 TRT	Kruse 21' (pen.)	Report	Donk 40'; Falcao 80' (pen.); Onyekuru 90+7'	Stadium: Şükrü Saracoğlu Stadium; Attendance: 45,096; Referee: Halil Umut Meler

1 March 2020 24	Galatasaray	3–0	Gençlerbirliği	Istanbul
19:00 TRT	Donk 3'; Falcao 33', 69'	Report		Stadium: Türk Telekom Stadı; Attendance: 40,035; Referee: Arda Kardeşler

8 March 2020 25	Sivasspor	2–2	Galatasaray	Sivas
19:00 TRT	Arslan 7'; Kılınç 59'	Report	Falcao 14'; Feghouli 37'	Stadium: 4 Eylül Stadı; Attendance: 19,438; Referee: Mete Kalkavan

15 March 2020 26	Galatasaray	0–0	Beşiktaş	Istanbul
19:00 TRT		Report		Stadium: Türk Telekom Stadium; Attendance: 0 Referee: Abdulkadir Bitigen

14 June 2020 27	Rizespor	2–0	Galatasaray	Rize
21:45 TRT	Škoda 42'; Torun 53'	Report		Stadium: Yeni Rize Şehir Stadium; Attendance: 0 Referee: Yaşar Kemal Uğurlu

21 June 2020 28	Galatasaray	3–3	Gaziantep	Istanbul
21:45 TRT	Falcao 36'; Belhanda 40'; Feghouli 66'	Report	Djilobodji 17'; Twumasi 78'; Maxim 90+14' (pen.)	Stadium: Türk Telekom Stadium; Attendance: 0 Referee: Alper Ulusoy

28 June 2020 29	İstanbul Başakşehir	1–1	Galatasaray	Istanbul
21:45 TRT	Aleksić 51'	Report	Akbaba 67'	Stadium: Başakşehir Fatih Terim Stadium; Attendance: 0 Referee: Ali Palabıyık

5 July 2020 30	Galatasaray	1–3	Trabzonspor	Istanbul
21:00 TRT	Seri 90+3' (pen.)	Report	Sosa 41' (pen.); Novák 70'; Sørloth 90+5'	Stadium: Türk Telekom Stadium; Attendance: 0 Referee: Cüneyt Çakır

8 July 2020 31	Alanyaspor	4–1	Galatasaray	Alanya
21:00 TRT	Cissé 43', 45+2'; Bakasetas 89'; Pektemek 90+4'	Report	Büyük 45+3'	Stadium: Bahçeşehir Okulları Stadium; Attendance: 0 Referee: Mete Kalkavan

12 July 2020 32	Ankaragücü	1–0	Galatasaray	Ankara
18:30 TRT	Scarione 62' (pen.)	Report		Stadium: Eryaman Stadium; Attendance: 0 Referee: Atilla Karaoğlan

18 July 2020 33	Galatasaray	3–1	Göztepe	Istanbul
21:00 TRT	Saracchi 60'; Akbaba 81'; Akgün 90+6'	Report	Napoleoni 77'	Stadium: Türk Telekom Stadium; Attendance: 0 Referee: Koray Gençerler

24 July 2020 34	Antalyaspor	2–2	Galatasaray	Antalya
21:00 TRT	Fredy 19'; Leschuk 90+2'	Report	Saracchi 58'; Belhanda 65' (pen.)	Stadium: New Antalya Stadium; Attendance: 0 Referee: Suat Arslanboğa

=== Turkish Super Cup ===
7 August 2019	Galatasaray	1–0	Akhisarspor	Ankara
20:45 TRT	Belhanda 39', (yellow card) 66'; Mariano (yellow card) 66'	Report	Bjarnason (yellow card) 34'; Ünlü (yellow card) 56'; Bayar (yellow card) 80'	Stadium: Eryaman Stadium; Attendance: 16,000; Referee: Halil Umut Meler

=== Turkish Cup ===
==== Fifth round ====
4 December 2019	Galatasaray	0–2	Tuzlaspor	Istanbul
20:45 TRT		Report	Baş 53'; Sönmez 90'	Stadium: Türk Telekom Stadı; Attendance: 5,629; Referee: Volkan Bayarslan

17 December 2019	Tuzlaspor	0–4 (2–4 agg.)	Galatasaray	Istanbul
20:45 TRT		Report	Nagatomo 10'; Falcao 16'; Feghouli 45+1'; Belhanda 90+2'	Stadium: Esenyurt Necmi Kadıoğlu; Referee: Koray Gençerler

==== Round of 16 ====
15 January 2020	Çaykur Rizespor	1–1	Galatasaray	Rize
20:30 TRT	Boldrin 38'	Report	Akbaba 39'	Stadium: Yeni Rize Şehir Stadium; Referee: Halis Özkahya

23 January 2020	Galatasaray	2–1 (3–2 agg.)	Çaykur Rizespor	Istanbul
20:30 TRT	Büyük 60' (pen.); Lemina 82'	Report	Çağlayan 77' (pen.)	Stadium: Türk Telekom Stadı; Attendance: 19,797; Referee: Atilla Karaoğlan

==== Quarter-finals ====
5 February 2020	Alanyaspor	2–0	Galatasaray	Antalya
20:30 TRT	Bakasetas 20'; Fernándes 55'	Report		Stadium: Bahçeşehir Okulları Stadium; Referee: Ali Şansalan

12 February 2020	Galatasaray	3–1 (3–3 (a) agg.)	Alanyaspor	Istanbul
20:30 TRT	Akbaba 9'; Büyük 55' (pen.), 85'	Report	Bammou 31'	Stadium: Türk Telekom Stadı; Attendance: 27,025; Referee: Yasar Kemal Uğurlu

=== UEFA Champions League ===
==== Group stage ====
Pos	Team	Pld	W	D	L	GF	GA	GD	Pts	Qualification
1	(France) Paris Saint-Germain	6	5	1	0	17	2	+15	16	Advance to knockout phase
2	(Spain) Real Madrid	6	3	2	1	14	8	+6	11	Advance to knockout phase
3	(Belgium) Club Brugge	6	0	3	3	4	12	−8	3	Transfer to Europa League
4	(Turkey) Galatasaray	6	0	2	4	1	14	−13	2	

Source: UEFA
Rules for classification: Group stage tiebreakers

18 September 2019 1	Club Brugge (Belgium)	0–0	(Turkey) Galatasaray	Bruges
18:55 CEST		Report		Stadium: Jan Breydel Stadium; Attendance: 26,616; Referee: Slavko Vinčić (Slovenia)

1 October 2019 2	Galatasaray (Turkey)	0–1	(France) Paris Saint-Germain	Istanbul
21:00 CEST		Report	Icardi 52'	Stadium: Türk Telekom Stadı; Attendance: 46,532; Referee: Szymon Marciniak (Poland)

22 October 2019 3	Galatasaray (Turkey)	0–1	(Spain) Real Madrid	Istanbul
21:00 CEST		Report	Kroos 18'	Stadium: Türk Telekom Stadium; Attendance: 49,528; Referee: Daniele Orsato (Italy)

6 November 2019 4	Real Madrid (Spain)	6–0	(Turkey) Galatasaray	Madrid
21:00 CEST	Rodrygo 4', 7', 90+3'; Ramos 13' (pen.); Benzema 45', 81'	Report		Stadium: Santiago Bernabéu; Attendance: 65,492; Referee: Felix Zwayer (Germany)

26 November 2019 5	Galatasaray (Turkey)	1–1	(Belgium) Club Brugge	Istanbul
18:55 CEST	Büyük 11'	Report	Diatta 90+2'	Stadium: Türk Telekom Stadium; Attendance: 34,500; Referee: Ivan Kružliak (Slovakia)

11 December 2019 6	Paris Saint-Germain (France)	5–0	(Turkey) Galatasaray	Paris
21:00 CEST	Icardi 32'; Sarabia 35'; Neymar 47'; Mbappé 63'; Cavani 84' (pen.)	Report		Stadium: Parc des Princes; Attendance: 46,509; Referee: István Kovács (Romania)

=== Attendances ===
Competition	Total. Att.	Avg. Att.
Süper Lig	458,001	35,231
Turkish Cup	52,451	17,484
Europe	130,560	43,520
Total	641,012	33,737

- Sold season tickets: 47,729

== See also ==
- 2019–20 Süper Lig
- 2019–20 Turkish Cup
- 2019–20 UEFA Champions League
