= 2020–21 Galatasaray S.K. season =

Galatasaray
2020–21 season
- President: Mustafa Cengiz
- Head coach: Fatih Terim
- Stadium: Türk Telekom Stadium
- Süper Lig: 2nd
- Turkish Cup: Quarter-finals
- UEFA Europa League: Play-off round
- Top goalscorer: League: Mbaye Diagne; Radamel Falcao (9 each); All: Mbaye Diagne (11)
- Biggest win: 6–0 (9 January 2021 vs Gençlerbirliği, Süper Lig)
- Biggest defeat: 3–4 (5 January 2021 vs Konyaspor, Süper Lig); 3–4 (19 March 2021 vs Çaykur Rizespor, Süper Lig)
Home colours	Away colours	Third colours

The 2020–21 Galatasaray S.K. season was the club's 117th season in existence and the club's 63rd consecutive season in the top flight of Turkish football. In addition to the domestic league, Galatasaray participated in this season's editions of the Turkish Cup and the UEFA Europa League. The season covered the period from 27 July 2020 to 30 June 2021.

== Club ==
=== Board of directors ===
You can see the fields of the board members by moving the pointer to the dotted field.

Position	Staff
Chairman	(Turkey) Mustafa Cengiz
Deputy Chairman	(Turkey) Abdurrahim Albayrak
Deputy Chairman	(Turkey) Yusuf Günay
Deputy Chairman	(Turkey) Kaan Kançal
Secretary General	(Turkey) İlber Aydemir
Deputy Member	(Turkey) Dorukhan Acar
Deputy Member	(Turkey) Prof. Dr. Emre Erdoğan
Deputy Member	(Turkey) Mahmut Recevik
Deputy Member	(Turkey) F.Okan Böke
Deputy Member	(Turkey) M.Ömer Cansever
Deputy Member	(Turkey) F.Dilek Kutlu
Deputy Member	(Turkey) Metin Karakaya
Deputy Member	(Turkey) Banu Vahapoğlu Akgün

Last updated: 27 July 2020
Source: Galatasaray.org

=== Staff ===
The list of the staff is below.

Field	Name
Manager	(Turkey) Fatih Terim
Assistant coach	(Turkey) Levent Şahin
Assistant coach	(Turkey) Ümit Davala
Assistant coach	(Spain) Albert Riera
Assistant coach	(Turkey) Necati Ateş
Assistant coach	(Turkey) Selçuk İnan
Goalkeeping coach	(Turkey) Fadıl Koşutan
Athletic performance coach	(United States) Scott Piri
Athletic performance coach	(Turkey) Yasin Küçük
Managing director	(Turkey) Şükrü Hanedar
Managing director assistant	(Turkey) Hakan Balta
Administrative manager	(Turkey) Uğur Yıldız
Administrative manager assistant	(Turkey) Mert Çetin
Communication coordinator	(Turkey) Aslı İşliel
Media and communication	(Turkey) Eray Sözen
Team Translator	(Turkey) Ersan Zeren
Match analysis officer	(Turkey) Halil Cihan Ünal
Computing expert	(Turkey) Olgu Şimşek
Doctor	(Turkey) Dr. Yener İnce
Doctor	(Turkey) Dr. İsmail Erman Büyükgök
Dietitian	(Turkey) Mestan Hüseyin Çilekçi
Physiotherapist	(Turkey) Mustafa Korkmaz
Physiotherapist	(Turkey) Burak Koca
Physiotherapist	(Turkey) Samet Polat
Masseur	(Turkey) Sedat Peker
Masseur	(Turkey) Batuhan Erkan
Masseur	(Turkey) Ozan Abaylı
Outfitter	(Turkey) Hasan Çelik
Outfitter	(Turkey) Veli Muğlı
Outfitter	(Turkey) İlyas Gökçe

=== Facilities ===
Position	Staff
Stadium	(Turkey) Türk Telekom Stadium
Sports Complex	(Turkey) Ali Sami Yen Sports Complex
Training facility	(Turkey) Florya Metin Oktay Facilities

== Kits ==
Galatasaray and Nike introduced their home and away jerseys on 27 July 2020.

- Supplier: Nike
- Main sponsor: Sixt
- Back sponsor: Magdeburger Sigorta
- Sleeve sponsor: Nesine.com
- Socks sponsor: $GAL Fan Token

== Transfers ==
=== Transfers in ===
No.	Pos.	Nat.	Name	Age	Moving from	Type	Transfer window	Ends	Transfer fee	Source
3	DF	(Turkey)	Emre Taşdemir	24	(Turkey) Kayserispor	End of loan	Summer	2021	Free	
11	FW	(Netherlands)	Ryan Babel	33	(Netherlands) AFC Ajax	End of loan	Summer	2022	Free	Fotomac.com.tr
66	DF	(Nigeria)	Valentine Ozornwafor	21	(Spain) UD Almería	End of loan	Summer	2023	Free	
91	FW	(Senegal)	Mbaye Diagne	28	(Belgium) Club Brugge KV	End of loan	Summer	2023	Free	Fotomac.com.tr
	DF	(Brazil)	Maicon Pereira Roque	31	(Saudi Arabia) Al-Nassr FC	End of loan	Summer	2021	Free	
66	MF	(Turkey)	Arda Turan	33	(Spain) Barcelona	Transfer	Summer	2022	Free	KAP.org.tr
17	MF	(Turkey)	Oğulcan Çağlayan	24	(Turkey) Çaykur Rizespor	Transfer	Summer	2024	Free	KAP.org.tr
54	MF	(Turkey)	Emre Kılınç	25	(Turkey) Sivasspor	Transfer	Summer	2024	Free	KAP.org.tr
99	GK	(France)	Fatih Öztürk	33	(Turkey) Kasımpaşa S.K.	Transfer	Summer	2022	Free	KAP.org.tr
3	DF	(Norway)	Omar Elabdellaoui	28	(Greece) Olympiacos F.C.	Transfer	Summer	2023	Free	KAP.org.tr
18	MF	(Turkey)	Kerem Aktürkoğlu	21	(Turkey) 24 Erzincanspor	Transfer	Summer	2024	Free	KAP.org.tr
22	DF	(United States)	DeAndre Yedlin	27	(England) Newcastle United F.C.	Transfer	Winter	2023	Free	KAP.org.tr

=== Loans in ===
No.	Pos.	Nat.	Name	Age	Moving from	Type	Transfer window	Ends	Transfer fee	Source
13	MF	(Nigeria)	Peter Etebo	24	(England) Stoke City F.C.	Loan	Summer	2021	€0.675M	KAP.org.tr
11	FW	(Turkey)	Halil Dervişoğlu	21	(England) Brentford F.C.	Loan	Winter	2021	Free	KAP.org.tr
7	MF	(Nigeria)	Henry Onyekuru	23	(France) AS Monaco FC	Loan	Winter	2021	€0.65M	KAP.org.tr
31	FW	(Egypt)	Mostafa Mohamed	23	(Egypt) Zamalek SC	Loan	Winter	2022	€2.50M	KAP.org.tr
83	MF	(Portugal)	Gedson Fernandes	22	(Portugal) S.L. Benfica	Loan	Winter	2021	€0.50M	KAP.org.tr

=== Transfers out ===
No.	Pos.	Nat.	Name	Age	Moving to	Type	Transfer window	Transfer fee	Source
6	MF	(Ivory Coast)	Jean Michaël Seri	29	(England) Fulham F.C.	End of loan	Summer	Free	
8	MF	(Turkey)	Selçuk İnan	35	Retired	Retirement	Summer	Free	Galatasaray.org
22	DF	(Brazil)	Mariano	34	(Brazil) Atlético Mineiro	End of contract	Summer	Free	Galatasaray.org
23	FW	(Romania)	Florin Andone	27	(England) Brighton & Hove Albion F.C.	End of loan	Summer	Free	Sporx.com
26	MF	(Turkey)	Mustafa Kapı	17	(France) Lille OSC	End of contract	Summer	€0.3M	Galatasaray.org
55	DF	(Japan)	Yuto Nagatomo	33	(France) Olympique de Marseille	End of contract	Summer	Free	OM Twitter
70	FW	(Nigeria)	Henry Onyekuru	23	(France) AS Monaco FC	End of loan	Summer	Free	Galatasaray.org
99	MF	(Gabon)	Mario Lemina	26	(England) Southampton F.C.	End of loan	Summer	Free	Hurriyet.com.tr
	DF	(Brazil)	Maicon Pereira Roque	31	(Saudi Arabia) Al-Nassr FC	Transfer	Summer	€1.43M	Galatasaray.org
7	FW	(Turkey)	Adem Büyük	33	(Turkey) Yeni Malatyaspor	Transfer	Summer	Free	KAP.org.tr
52	MF	(Turkey)	Celil Yüksel	22	(Turkey) Adanaspor	Transfer	Summer	€0.1M	KAP.org.tr
5	DF	(Turkey)	Ahmet Yılmaz Çalık	26	(Turkey) Konyaspor	Transfer	Summer	Free	KAP.org.tr
41	FW	(Turkey)	Erencan Yardımcı	18	(Turkey) Eyüpspor	Transfer	Winter	€0.483M	KAP.org.tr
10	MF	(Morocco)	Younès Belhanda	31		Termination of Contract	Winter	Free	KAP.org.tr

=== Loans out ===
No.	Pos.	Nat.	Name	Age	Moving to	Type	Transfer window	Transfer fee	Source
46	DF	(Turkey)	Gökay Güney	21	(Turkey) Bandırmaspor	Loan	Summer	Free	beinsports.com
	MF	(Turkey)	Ferhan Evren	19	(Turkey) Bandırmaspor	Loan	Summer	Free	beinsports.com
	MF	(Turkey)	Abdussamed Karnucu	20	(Turkey) Tarsus İdman Yurdu	Loan	Summer	Free	aspor.com.tr
35	MF	(Turkey)	Yunus Akgün	20	(Turkey) Adana Demirspor	Loan	Summer	Free	Galatasaray SK Twitter
	GK	(Turkey)	Berk Balaban	20	(Turkey) Ankaraspor	Loan	Summer	Free	Galatasaray SK Twitter
21	MF	(Sweden)	Jimmy Durmaz	31	(Turkey) Fatih Karagümrük S.K.	Loan	Summer	€0.3M	KAP.org.tr
30	MF	(Turkey)	Atalay Babacan	20	(Turkey) Adanaspor	Loan	Summer	Free	Galatasaray SK Twitter
	DF	(Turkey)	Süleyman Luş	19	(Turkey) Şanlıurfaspor	Loan	Summer	Free	Hurriyet.com.tr
80	FW	(Turkey)	Ali Yavuz Kol	19	(Turkey) Denizlispor	Loan	Winter	Free	KAP.org.tr
77	MF	(Nigeria)	Jesse Sekidika	24	(Turkey) Konyaspor	Loan	Winter	Free	KAP.org.tr
91	FW	(Senegal)	Mbaye Diagne	28	(England) West Bromwich Albion F.C.	Loan	Winter	€1.3M	KAP.org.tr
40	DF	(Turkey)	Emin Bayram	17	(Turkey) Boluspor	Loan	Winter	Free	KAP.org.tr

Total spending: €0.412M ▼
Total income: €3.913M ▲
Expenditure: €4.325M ▲

== First team squad ==
N	Pos.	Nat.	Name	Age	EU	Since	App	Goals	Ends	Transfer fee	Notes
1	GK	(Uruguay)	Fernando Muslera (Captain)	40	EU	2011	385	1	2021	€6.75M + Cana	Second nationality: Italian
2	DF	(Turkey)	Şener Özbayraklı	36	Non-EU	2019	27	0	2021	Free	
3	DF	(Norway)	Omar Elabdellaoui	34	Non-EU	2020	13	0	2023	Free	
4	MF	(Turkey)	Taylan Antalyalı	31	Non-EU	2019	59	2	2023	€1M	
7	MF	(Nigeria)	Henry Onyekuru	29	Non-EU	2021	71	22	2021	€0.65M	On loan from AS Monaco
8	FW	(Netherlands)	Ryan Babel	39	EU	2019	57	13	2022	Free	Second nationality: Surinamese
9	FW	(Colombia)	Radamel Falcao	40	Non-EU	2019	40	20	2022	Free	
11	FW	(Turkey)	Halil Dervişoğlu	26	EU	2021	12	3	2021	Free	On loan from Brentford
13	MF	(Nigeria)	Peter Etebo	30	Non-EU	2020	29	0	2021	€0.675M	On loan from Stoke City
14	DF	(Norway)	Martin Linnes	34	Non-EU	2016	146	5	2021	€2M	
15	MF	(Suriname)	Ryan Donk (Vice-Captain)	40	EU	2016	155	8	2021	€2.5M	Second nationality: Dutch
17	FW	(Turkey)	Oğulcan Çağlayan	30	Non-EU	2020	20	4	2024	Free	
18	MF	(Turkey)	Kerem Aktürkoğlu	27	Non-EU	2020	29	6	2024	Free	
19	MF	(Turkey)	Ömer Bayram	35	EU	2018	98	2	2021	€0.4M	Second nationality: Dutch
20	MF	(Turkey)	Emre Akbaba	33	EU	2018	71	14	2022	€4M	Second nationality: French
22	DF	(United States)	DeAndre Yedlin	33	EU	2021	12	1	2023	Free	Second nationality: Latvia
23	DF	(Turkey)	Emre Taşdemir	31	Non-EU	2019	29	0	2021	Free	
27	DF	(Democratic Republic of the Congo)	Christian Luyindama	32	Non-EU	2019	60	4	2022	€5M	
31	FW	(Egypt)	Mostafa Mohamed	28	Non-EU	2021	17	9	2022	€2.50M	On loan from Zamalek SC
34	GK	(Turkey)	Okan Kocuk	31	Non-EU	2019	24	0	2023	Free	
36	DF	(Uruguay)	Marcelo Saracchi	28	EU	2020	43	2	2021	€0.6M	On loan from RB Leipzig
45	DF	(Brazil)	Marcão	30	Non-EU	2019	102	1	2022	€4M	
49	DF	(Nigeria)	Valentine Ozornwafor	27	Non-EU	2019	1	0	2023	€0.2M	
54	MF	(Turkey)	Emre Kılınç	31	Non-EU	2020	41	4	2024	Free	
63	MF	(Turkey)	Bartuğ Elmaz	23	Non-EU	2020	1	0	2022	Youth system	
66	MF	(Turkey)	Arda Turan (Vice-Captain)	39	Non-EU	2020	224	48	2022	Free	
83	MF	(Portugal)	Gedson Fernandes	27	EU	2021	18	1	2021	€0.50M	On loan from S.L. Benfica
89	MF	(Algeria)	Sofiane Feghouli	36	EU	2017	132	29	2022	€4.25M	Second nationality: French
99	GK	(France)	Fatih Öztürk	39	EU	2020	12	0	2022	Free	Second nationality: Turkish
Players sold or loaned out after the start of the season
10	MF	(Morocco)	Younès Belhanda	36	EU	2017	131	22	2021	€8M	Second nationality: French
21	MF	(Sweden)	Jimmy Durmaz	37	EU	2019	17	0	2022	Free	Second nationality: Turkish
40	DF	(Turkey)	Emin Bayram	23	Non-EU	2019	8	0	2022	Youth system	
41	FW	(Turkey)	Erencan Yardımcı	24	Non-EU	2019	1	0	2022	Youth system	
77	MF	(Nigeria)	Jesse Sekidika	30	Non-EU	2020	16	1	2024	€0.2M	
80	FW	(Turkey)	Ali Yavuz Kol	25	Non-EU	2018	7	0	2024	Youth system	
90	FW	(Senegal)	Mbaye Diagne	34	Non-EU	2019	39	22	2023	€13M	

- Last updated: 15 May 2021
- Source: Galatasaray.org
- Ordered by squad number.

== Statistics ==
=== Appearances ===
Last updated: 15 May 2021.
Source: ntvspor.net, uefa.com

No.	PMF.	Nat.	Player	Süper Lig						Turkish Cup						Europa League						Total					
No.	PMF.	Nat.	Player	Ap	G	A	Booked	(yellow card) (red card)	Sent off (straight red)	Ap	G	A	Booked	(yellow card) (red card)	Sent off (straight red)	Ap	G	A	Booked	(yellow card) (red card)	Sent off (straight red)	Ap	G	A	Booked	(yellow card) (red card)	Sent off (straight red)
1	GK	(Uruguay)	Fernando Muslera (Captain)	22	-	-	2	-	-	1	-	-	-	-	-	-	-	-	-	-	-	23	-	-	2	-	-
2	DF	(Turkey)	Şener Özbayraklı	12	-	2	1	-	-	2	-	-	-	-	-	-	-	-	-	-	-	14	-	2	1	-	-
3	DF	(Norway)	Omar Elabdellaoui	10	-	-	2	-	-	1	-	-	-	-	-	2	-	-	1	-	-	13	-	-	3	-	-
4	MF	(Turkey)	Taylan Antalyalı	34	1	2	8	-	-	2	-	-	-	-	-	3	-	-	-	-	-	39	1	2	8	-	-
7	MF	(Nigeria)	Henry Onyekuru	14	5	-	1	-	-	1	-	-	-	-	-	-	-	-	-	-	-	15	5	-	1	-	-
8	FW	(Netherlands)	Ryan Babel	32	7	5	5	-	-	2	-	-	-	-	-	3	1	-	-	-	-	37	8	5	5	-	-
9	FW	(Colombia)	Radamel Falcao	17	9	2	2	1	-	-	-	-	-	-	-	1	-	-	-	-	-	18	9	2	2	1	-
11	FW	(Turkey)	Halil Dervişoğlu	12	3	1	-	-	-	-	-	-	-	-	-	-	-	-	-	-	-	12	3	1	-	-	-
13	MF	(Nigeria)	Peter Etebo	24	-	-	4	1	-	3	-	-	-	-	-	2	-	-	-	-	-	29	-	-	4	1	-
14	DF	(Norway)	Martin Linnes	22	-	1	1	-	-	1	-	-	-	-	-	3	-	-	-	-	-	26	-	1	1	-	-
15	MF	(Suriname)	Ryan Donk (Vice-captain)	32	2	2	3	-	1	1	-	-	-	-	-	1	-	-	-	-	-	34	2	2	3	-	1
17	FW	(Turkey)	Oğulcan Çağlayan	18	4	1	1	-	-	2	-	-	-	-	-	-	-	-	-	-	-	20	4	1	1	-	-
18	MF	(Turkey)	Kerem Aktürkoğlu	27	6	2	1	-	-	2	-	-	-	-	-	-	-	-	-	-	-	29	6	2	1	-	-
19	MF	(Turkey)	Ömer Bayram	32	-	2	4	-	-	3	-	1	-	-	-	3	-	1	1	-	-	38	-	4	5	-	-
20	MF	(Turkey)	Emre Akbaba	27	5	2	2	-	-	3	-	-	-	-	-	-	-	-	-	-	-	30	5	2	2	-	-
22	DF	(United States)	DeAndre Yedlin	11	1	-	1	1	-	1	-	-	-	-	-	-	-	-	-	-	-	12	1	-	1	1	-
23	DF	(Turkey)	Emre Taşdemir	9	-	1	2	-	-	2	-	-	-	-	-	1	-	-	-	-	-	12	-	1	2	-	-
27	DF	(Democratic Republic of the Congo)	Christian Luyindama	24	-	1	4	-	-	2	1	-	-	-	-	2	1	-	-	-	-	28	2	1	4	-	-
31	FW	(Egypt)	Mostafa Mohamed	16	8	-	2	-	1	1	1	-	-	-	-	-	-	-	-	-	-	17	9	-	2	-	1
34	GK	(Turkey)	Okan Kocuk	10	-	-	1	-	-	1	-	-	-	-	-	-	-	-	-	-	-	11	-	-	1	-	-
36	DF	(Uruguay)	Marcelo Saracchi	27	-	2	2	-	-	1	-	-	-	-	-	1	-	-	1	-	-	29	-	2	3	-	-
45	DF	(Brazil)	Marcão	37	-	-	10	-	1	2	-	-	1	-	-	3	1	-	-	-	-	42	1	-	11	-	1
49	DF	(Nigeria)	Valentine Ozornwafor	1	-	-	-	-	-	-	-	-	-	-	-	-	-	-	-	-	-	1	-	-	-	-	-
54	MF	(Turkey)	Emre Kılınç	35	4	4	-	-	1	3	-	-	-	-	-	3	-	1	-	-	-	41	4	5	-	-	1
63	MF	(Turkey)	Bartuğ Elmaz	1	-	-	-	-	-	-	-	-	-	-	-	-	-	-	-	-	-	1	-	-	-	-	-
66	MF	(Turkey)	Arda Turan (Vice-captain)	32	4	2	7	-	-	1	-	-	-	-	-	1	-	-	-	-	-	34	4	2	7	-	-
83	MF	(Portugal)	Gedson Fernandes	17	-	3	2	-	-	1	1	-	-	-	-	-	-	-	-	-	-	18	1	3	2	-	-
89	MF	(Algeria)	Sofiane Feghouli	22	2	4	-	-	-	-	-	-	-	-	-	3	-	-	1	-	-	25	2	4	1	-	-
99	GK	(France)	Fatih Öztürk	8	-	-	2	-	-	1	-	-	-	-	-	3	-	-	-	-	-	12	-	-	2	-	-
10	MF	(Morocco)	Younès Belhanda	22	6	3	4	-	-	3	1	-	-	-	-	3	1	-	1	-	-	28	8	3	5	-	-
21	MF	(Sweden)	Jimmy Durmaz	1	-	-	-	-	-	-	-	-	-	-	-	1	-	-	-	-	-	2	-	-	-	-	-
40	DF	(Turkey)	Emin Bayram	2	-	-	-	-	-	1	-	-	-	-	-	-	-	-	-	-	-	3	-	-	-	-	-
41	DF	(Turkey)	Erencan Yardımcı	-	-	-	-	-	-	-	-	-	-	-	-	-	-	-	-	-	-	-	-	-	-	-	-
77	MF	(Nigeria)	Jesse Sekidika	6	1	-	-	-	-	1	-	-	-	-	-	-	-	-	-	-	-	7	1	-	-	-	-
80	FW	(Turkey)	Ali Yavuz Kol	4	-	-	1	-	-	1	-	-	-	-	-	-	-	-	-	-	-	5	-	-	1	-	-
90	FW	(Senegal)	Mbaye Diagne	15	9	-	1	-	1	1	-	-	-	-	-	3	2	-	-	-	-	19	11	-	1	-	1

=== Goals ===
Includes all competitive matches.

Last updated: 15 May 2021.
Source: ntvspor.net

Position	Nation	Number	Name	Süper Lig	Turkish Cup	UEFA Europa League	Total
1	(Senegal)	90	Mbaye Diagne	9	0	2	11
2	(Colombia)	9	Radamel Falcao	9	0	0	9
2	(Egypt)	31	Mostafa Mohamed	8	1	0	9
3	(Morocco)	10	Younes Belhanda	6	1	1	8
3	(Netherlands)	8	Ryan Babel	7	0	1	8
4	(Turkey)	18	Kerem Aktürkoğlu	6	0	0	6
5	(Nigeria)	7	Henry Onyekuru	5	0	0	5
5	(Turkey)	20	Emre Akbaba	5	0	0	5
6	(Turkey)	54	Emre Kılınç	4	0	0	4
6	(Turkey)	66	Arda Turan	4	0	0	4
6	(Turkey)	17	Oğulcan Çağlayan	4	0	0	4
7	(Turkey)	11	Halil Dervişoğlu	3	0	0	3
8	(Algeria)	89	Sofiane Feghouli	2	0	0	2
8	(Democratic Republic of the Congo)	27	Christian Luyindama	0	1	1	2
8	(Suriname)	15	Ryan Donk	2	0	0	2
9
9	(Portugal)	83	Gedson Fernandes	0	1	0	1
9	(Nigeria)	77	Jesse Sekidika	1	0	0	1
9	(Turkey)	4	Taylan Antalyalı	1	0	0	1
9	(Brazil)	45	Marcão	0	0	1	1
9	(United States)	22	DeAndre Yedlin	1	0	0	1
9			Own Goals	3	0	0	3
			TOTAL	80	4	6	90

=== Hat-tricks ===
Player	Against	Result	Date	Competition	Ref
(Senegal) Mbaye Diagne	Rizespor	4–0 (A)	28 November 2020	Süper Lig	
(Morocco) Younès Belhanda	Gençlerbirliği	6–0 (H)	9 January 2021	Süper Lig	
(Turkey) Kerem Aktürkoğlu	Göztepe	3–1 (A)	17 April 2021	Süper Lig	

(H) – Home; (A) – Away

=== Assists ===
Includes all competitive matches.

Last updated: 15 May 2021.
Source: ntvspor.net

Position	Nation	Number	Name	Süper Lig	UEFA Europa League	Turkish Cup	Total
1	(Netherlands)	8	Ryan Babel	5	0	0	5
1	(Turkey)	54	Emre Kılınç	4	1	0	5
2	(Suriname)	15	Ryan Donk	4	0	0	4
2	(Turkey)	19	Ömer Bayram	2	1	1	4
2	(Algeria)	89	Sofiane Feghouli	4	0	0	4
3	(Morocco)	10	Younes Belhanda	3	0	0	3
3	(Portugal)	83	Gedson Fernandes	3	0	0	3
3	(Turkey)	4	Taylan Antalyalı	2	1	0	3
4	(Turkey)	20	Emre Akbaba	2	0	0	2
4	(Turkey)	66	Arda Turan	2	0	0	2
4	(Colombia)	9	Radamel Falcao	2	0	0	2
4	(Norway)	14	Martin Linnes	1	1	0	2
4	(Turkey)	23	Emre Taşdemir	1	1	0	2
4	(Uruguay)	36	Marcelo Saracchi	2	0	0	2
4	(Turkey)	2	Şener Özbayraklı	2	0	0	2
4	(Turkey)	18	Kerem Aktürkoğlu	2	0	0	2
5	(Turkey)	11	Halil Dervişoğlu	1	0	0	1
5	(Turkey)	17	Oğulcan Çağlayan	1	0	0	1
5	(Brazil)	45	Marcão	0	1	0	1
5	(Democratic Republic of the Congo)	27	Christian Luyindama	1	0	0	1
			TOTAL	44	6	1	51

=== Clean sheets ===
Last updated: 15 May 2021.
Source: TFF.org Süper Lig, TFF.org Turkish Cup, UEFA.com Europa League

Rank	No.	Pos	Nat	Name	Süper Lig	Turkish Cup	Europa League	Total
1	1	GK	(Uruguay)	Fernando Muslera	9	0	0	9
2	34	GK	(Turkey)	Okan Kocuk	4	1	0	5
2	99	GK	(Turkey)	Fatih Öztürk	4	0	1	5
Totals					17	1	1	19

=== Disciplinary record ===
N	Pos.	Nat.	Name	Yellow card	Second yellow card	Red card	Notes
1	GK	(Uruguay)	Fernando Muslera	2			
2	DF	(Turkey)	Şener Özbayraklı	1			
3	DF	(Norway)	Omar Elabdellaoui	3			
4	MF	(Turkey)	Taylan Antalyalı	8			
7	MF	(Nigeria)	Henry Onyekuru	1			
8	FW	(Netherlands)	Ryan Babel	5			
9	FW	(Colombia)	Radamel Falcao	2	1		
10	MF	(Morocco)	Younès Belhanda	5			
11	FW	(Turkey)	Halil Dervişoğlu				
13	MF	(Nigeria)	Peter Etebo	4	1		
14	DF	(Norway)	Martin Linnes	1			
15	MF	(Suriname)	Ryan Donk	3		1	
17	MF	(Turkey)	Oğulcan Çağlayan	1			
18	MF	(Turkey)	Kerem Aktürkoğlu	1			
19	MF	(Turkey)	Ömer Bayram	5			
20	MF	(Turkey)	Emre Akbaba	2			
21	MF	(Sweden)	Jimmy Durmaz				
22	DF	(United States)	DeAndre Yedlin	1	1		
23	DF	(Turkey)	Emre Taşdemir	2			
27	DF	(Democratic Republic of the Congo)	Christian Luyindama	4			
31	FW	(Egypt)	Mostafa Mohamed	2		1	
34	GK	(Turkey)	Okan Kocuk	1			
36	DF	(Uruguay)	Marcelo Saracchi	3			
40	GK	(Turkey)	Emin Bayram				
41	DF	(Turkey)	Erencan Yardımcı				
45	DF	(Brazil)	Marcão	11		1	
49	DF	(Nigeria)	Valentine Ozornwafor				
54	MF	(Turkey)	Emre Kılınç			1	
63	MF	(Turkey)	Bartuğ Elmaz				
66	MF	(Turkey)	Arda Turan	7			
77	MF	(Nigeria)	Jesse Sekidika				
80	FW	(Turkey)	Ali Yavuz Kol	1			
83	MF	(Portugal)	Gedson Fernandes	2			
89	MF	(Algeria)	Sofiane Feghouli	1			
90	FW	(Senegal)	Mbaye Diagne	1		1	
99	GK	(Turkey)	Fatih Öztürk	2			

Last updated: 15 May 2021
Source: ntvspor.net
Only competitive matches
(yellow card) = Number of bookings; (second yellow card) = Number of sending offs after a second yellow card; (red card) = Number of sending offs by a direct red card.

=== Injury record ===
N	P	Nat.	Name	Type	Status	Source	Match	Inj. Date	Ret. Date
1	GK	(Uruguay)	Fernando Muslera	Tibia and Fibula Fracture		beinsports.com	2019–20 season	Pre-Season	29 November 2020
20	MF	(Turkey)	Emre Akbaba	Thigh Muscle Strain		fotomac.com.tr	vs Antalyaspor	24 July 2020	15 October 2020
36	DF	(Uruguay)	Marcelo Saracchi	Groin Injury		haberturk.com	vs Başakşehir	21 September 2020	15 October 2020
66	MF	(Turkey)	Arda Turan	Influenza		trtspor.com.tr	illness	28 September 2020	2 October 2020
4	MF	(Turkey)	Taylan Antalyalı	Groin Strain		ntvspor.net	in training	4 October 2020	17 October 2020
13	MF	(Nigeria)	Peter Etebo	Groin Strain		milligazete.com.tr	vs Kasımpaşa	4 October 2020	15 October 2020
14	DF	(Norway)	Martin Linnes	Unknown Injury		hurriyet.com.tr	unknown	19 October 2020	29 October 2020
89	MF	(Algeria)	Sofiane Feghouli	Back trouble		fanatik.com.tr	in training	22 October 2020	25 October 2020
10	MF	(Morocco)	Younès Belhanda	Thigh Muscle Strain		sozcu.com.tr	vs Erzurumspor	26 October 2020	5 November 2020
45	DF	(Brazil)	Marcão	Hamstring Injury		hurriyet.com.tr	in training	31 October 2020	7 November 2020
23	DF	(Turkey)	Emre Taşdemir	Injury to the ankle		fotomac.com.tr	vs Ankaragücü	31 October 2020	4 November 2020
36	DF	(Uruguay)	Marcelo Saracchi	Groin Injury		sabah.com.tr	vs Ankaragücü	1 November 2020	17 November 2020
9	FW	(Colombia)	Radamel Falcao	Thigh Muscle Strain		aa.com.tr	in training	5 November 2020	23 December 2020
3	DF	(Norway)	Omar Elabdellaoui	Corona virus		milliyet.com.tr	epidemic	13 November 2020	9 December 2020
27	DF	(Democratic Republic of the Congo)	Christian Luyindama	Unknown Injury		fotomac.com.tr	in training	13 November 2020	22 November 2020
8	FW	(Netherlands)	Ryan Babel	Corona virus		ntvspor.net	epidemic	15 November 2020	6 December 2020
10	MF	(Morocco)	Younès Belhanda	Corona virus		hurriyet.com.tr	epidemic	16 November 2020	3 December 2020
34	GK	(Turkey)	Okan Kocuk	Corona virus		gazetevatan.com	epidemic	16 November 2020	3 December 2020
66	MF	(Turkey)	Arda Turan	Corona virus		ntvspor.net	epidemic	17 November 2020	3 December 2020
36	DF	(Uruguay)	Marcelo Saracchi	Unknown Injury		hurriyet.com.tr	unknown	24 November 2020	16 December 2020
1	GK	(Uruguay)	Fernando Muslera	Fitness		cumhuriyet.com.tr	in training	29 November 2020	18 January 2021
8	FW	(Netherlands)	Ryan Babel	Back trouble		Galatasaray.org	in training	9 December 2020	3 January 2021
18	MF	(Turkey)	Kerem Aktürkoğlu	Corona virus		cnnturk.com	epidemic	13 December 2020	27 December 2020
99	GK	(Turkey)	Fatih Öztürk	Knee Problems		sozcu.com.tr	in training	14 December 2020	16 December 2020
23	DF	(Turkey)	Emre Taşdemir	Corona virus		twitter.com	epidemic	16 December 2020	27 December 2020
99	GK	(Turkey)	Fatih Öztürk	Corona virus		fotomac.com.tr	epidemic	16 December 2020	27 December 2020
13	MF	(Nigeria)	Peter Etebo	Thigh Muscle Strain		fanatik.com.tr	in training	21 December 2020	10 January 2021
90	FW	(Senegal)	Mbaye Diagne	Quarantine		hurriyet.com.tr	epidemic	25 December 2020	28 December 2020
89	MF	(Algeria)	Sofiane Feghouli	Thigh Muscle Strain		fanatik.com.tr	vs Trabzonspor	26 December 2020	14 January 2021
3	DF	(Norway)	Omar Elabdellaoui	Eye Injury		Galatasaray.org	at home	31 December 2020	25 January 2022
9	FW	(Colombia)	Radamel Falcao	Thigh muscle rupture		fotomac.com.tr	vs Antalyaspor	2 January 2021	3 February 2021
23	DF	(Turkey)	Emre Taşdemir	Thigh muscle rupture		fanatik.com.tr	vs Malatyaspor	12 January 2021	3 February 2021
2	DF	(Turkey)	Şener Özbayraklı	Muscle partial avulsion		cumhuriyet.com.tr	vs Beşiktaş	17 January 2021	7 February 2021
17	FW	(Turkey)	Oğulcan Çağlayan	Thigh Muscle Strain		ntvspor.net	vs Beşiktaş	17 January 2021	7 February 2021
89	MF	(Algeria)	Sofiane Feghouli	Hamstring Injury		fotomac.com.tr	vs Malatyaspor	24 January 2021	15 February 2021
83	MF	(Portugal)	Gedson Fernandes	Quarantine		ntvspor.net	epidemic	1 February 2021	7 February 2021
36	DF	(Uruguay)	Marcelo Saracchi	Muscle partial avulsion		aspor.com.tr	vs Fenerbahçe	7 February 2021	5 March 2021
11	FW	(Turkey)	Halil Dervişoğlu	Corona virus		takvim.com.tr	epidemic	8 February 2021	21 February 2021
15	MF	(Suriname)	Ryan Donk	Ruptured intraarticular ligament initiation in the ankle		trthaber.com	vs Sivasspor	7 March 2021	17 March 2021
54	MF	(Turkey)	Emre Kılınç	Corona virus		fotomac.com.tr	epidemic	26 March 2021	9 April 2021
18	MF	(Turkey)	Kerem Aktürkoğlu	Thigh Muscle Strain		hurriyet.com.tr	in training	28 March 2021	9 April 2021
4	MF	(Turkey)	Taylan Antalyalı	Corona virus		cnnturk.com	epidemic	31 March 2021	10 April 2021
14	DF	(Norway)	Martin Linnes	Groin Strain		trtspor.com.tr	in training	7 April 2021	25 April 2021
66	MF	(Turkey)	Arda Turan	Thigh Muscle Strain		trtspor.com.tr	in training	9 April 2021	13 April 2021
22	DF	(United States)	DeAndre Yedlin	Unknown Injury		sporx.com	vs Fatih Karagümrük	10 April 2021	29 April 2021
9	FW	(Colombia)	Radamel Falcao	Facial Fracture		galatasaray.org	in training	11 April 2021	25 April 2021
7	MF	(Nigeria)	Henry Onyekuru	Thigh Muscle Strain		hurriyet.com.tr	in training	13 April 2021	15 April 2021
31	FW	(Egypt)	Mostafa Mohamed	Corona virus		sozcu.com.tr	epidemic	13 April 2021	24 April 2021
7	MF	(Nigeria)	Henry Onyekuru	Thigh Muscle Strain		fanatik.com.tr	in training	20 April 2021	1 May 2021
27	DF	(Democratic Republic of the Congo)	Christian Luyindama	Corona virus		aspor.com.tr	epidemic	26 April 2021	6 May 2021
99	GK	(Turkey)	Fatih Öztürk	Corona virus		sporx.com	epidemic	26 April 2021	6 May 2021
49	DF	(Nigeria)	Valentine Ozornwafor	Corona virus		aspor.com.tr	epidemic	26 April 2021	6 May 2021
13	MF	(Nigeria)	Peter Etebo	Corona virus		fotomac.com.tr	epidemic	29 April 2021	9 May 2021
9	FW	(Colombia)	Radamel Falcao	Thigh Muscle Strain		ntvspor.net	in training	9 May 2021	16 May 2021
23	DF	(Turkey)	Emre Taşdemir	Calf Injury		ntvspor.net	in training	9 May 2021	16 May 2021
7	MF	(Nigeria)	Henry Onyekuru	Calf Problems		sozcu.com.tr	in training	11 May 2021	16 May 2021

- Player is injured
- Player has recovered from injury
Last updated: 28 January 2022
Source: Galatasaray Sports Club

== Pre-season, mid-season and friendlies ==
Win Draw Loss

24 August 2020 Pre-season	Galatasaray (Turkey)	6–2	(Turkey) Galatasaray U21	Istanbul
11:00 CEST	Falcao; Arda; Emre Kılınç; Emin Bayram; Diagne	Report	Goal	Stadium: Florya Metin Oktay Facilities; Attendance: 0

28 August 2020 Pre-season	Galatasaray (Turkey)	1–0	(Turkey) İstanbulspor	Istanbul
17:00 CEST	Diagne	Report		Stadium: Florya Metin Oktay Facilities; Attendance: 0

31 August 2020 Pre-season	Galatasaray (Turkey)	2–0	(Turkey) Ümraniyespor	Istanbul
16:00 CEST	Falcao 6'; Ömer 80'	Report		Stadium: Florya Metin Oktay Facilities; Attendance: 0

3 September 2020 Pre-season	Galatasaray (Turkey)	1–1	(Turkey) Hatayspor	Istanbul
17:00 CEST	Arda 32'	Report	66'	Stadium: Türk Telekom Stadium; Attendance: 0

9 October 2020 Mid-season	Galatasaray (Turkey)	0–0	Turkey national under-21 football team	Istanbul
17:00 CEST		Report		Stadium: Florya Metin Oktay Facilities; Attendance: 0

== Competitions ==
=== Overview ===
Competition	First match	Last match	Starting round	Final position	Record							
Competition	First match	Last match	Starting round	Final position	Pld	W	D	L	GF	GA	GD	Win %
Süper Lig	12 September 2020	15 May 2021	Matchday 1	2nd	40	26	6	8	80	36	+44	65.00
Turkish Cup	15 December 2020	10 February 2021	Fifth Round	Quarter-finals	3	1	1	1	4	4	+0	33.33
Europa League	17 September 2020	1 October 2020	Second qualifying round	Play-off round	3	2	0	1	6	3	+3	66.67
Total					46	29	7	10	90	43	+47	63.04

Last updated: 15 May 2021
Source: Competitions

=== Süper Lig ===
==== League table ====
Pos	Team	Pld	W	D	L	GF	GA	GD	Pts	Qualification or relegation
1	Beşiktaş (C)	40	26	6	8	89	44	+45	84	Qualification for the Champions League group stage
2	Galatasaray	40	26	6	8	80	36	+44	84	Qualification for the Champions League second qualifying round
3	Fenerbahçe	40	25	7	8	72	41	+31	82	Qualification for the Europa League play-off round
4	Trabzonspor	40	19	14	7	50	37	+13	71	Qualification for the Europa Conference League third qualifying round
5	Sivasspor	40	16	17	7	54	43	+11	65	Qualification for the Europa Conference League second qualifying round

Source: Süper Lig, Soccerway
Rules for classification: 1) Points; 2) Head-to-head points; 3) Head-to-head goal difference; 4) Head-to-head goals scored; 5) Goal difference; 6) Goals scored; 7) Play-off.
(C) Champions

==== Results summary ====
Overall								Home						Away					
Pld	W	D	L	GF	GA	GD	Pts	W	D	L	GF	GA	GD	W	D	L	GF	GA	GD
40	26	6	8	80	36	+44	84	12	6	2	45	17	+28	14	0	6	35	19	+16

Last updated: 15 May 2021.
Source: TFF.org

==== Results by round ====
Round	1	2	3	4	5	6	7	8	9	10	11	12	13	14	15	16	17	18	19	20	21	22	23	24	25	26	27	28	29	30	31	32	33	34	35	36	37	38	39	40	41	42
Ground	H	A	H	A	H	A	H	A	H	A	H	B	A	H	A	H	A	H	A	H	A	A	H	A	H	A	H	A	H	A	H	A	B	H	A	H	A	H	A	H	A	H
Result	W	W	D	L	L	W	W	W	D	W	W	B	L	W	W	D	L	W	L	W	W	W	W	W	W	W	W	L	D	W	L	L	B	D	W	D	W	W	W	W	W	W
Position	4	1	3	4	6	3	3	3	3	2	2	2	2	2	1	3	4	3	4	3	3	3	2	1	1	1	1	1	2	2	2	3	3	3	3	3	3	3	3	3	2	2

Updated to match(es) played on 15 May 2021. Source: TFF.org
A = Away; H = Home; B = Bye; W = Win; D = Draw; L = Loss

==== Matches ====
12 September 2020 1	Galatasaray	3–1	Gaziantep	Istanbul
20:00 TRT	Falcao 8' (pen.) 40'; Emre 28'; Luyindama (yellow card) 23'; Belhanda (yellow card) 78'	Report	André 53'; Kubilay (yellow card) 7'; Júnior Morais (yellow card) 63'; Jefferson (yellow card) 82'	Stadium: Türk Telekom Stadium; Attendance: 0 Referee: Bahattin Şimşek; Assistant referees: İbrahim Bozbey, İlker Takpak; Fourth official: Turgut Doman

20 September 2020 2	Başakşehir	0–2	Galatasaray	Istanbul
19:00 TRT	Epureanu (yellow card) 39'; Mahmut (yellow card) 45'; Ba (yellow card) 66'	Report	Falcao 14' (pen.); Belhanda 76'; Taylan (yellow card) 86'	Stadium: Başakşehir Fatih Terim Stadium; Attendance: 0 Referee: Atilla Karaoğlan; Assistant referees: Kerem Ersoy, Serkan Ok; Fourth official: Tugay Kaan Numanoğlu

27 September 2020 3	Galatasaray	0–0	Fenerbahçe	Istanbul
19:00 TRT	Luyindama (yellow card) 15'; Falcao (yellow card) 47'; Arda (yellow card) 61'; Taylan (yellow card) 62'; Etebo (yellow card) 82'; Marcão (yellow card) 85'; Belhanda (yellow card) 86'	Report	Sosa (yellow card) 12'; Tisserand (yellow card) 23'; Gökhan (yellow card) 70'; Luiz Gustavo (yellow card) 90'	Stadium: Türk Telekom Stadium; Attendance: 0 Referee: Ali Palabıyık; Assistant referees: Serkan Olguncan, Mehmet Cem Satman; Fourth official: Mete Kalkavan

4 October 2020 4	Kasımpaşa	1–0	Galatasaray	Istanbul
19:00 TRT	Yusuf 45'; Ramazan (yellow card) 79'	Report	Luyindama (yellow card) 85'	Stadium: Recep Tayyip Erdoğan Stadium; Attendance: 0 Referee: Cüneyt Çakır; Assistant referees: Tarık Ongun, Orkun Aktaş; Fourth official: Yasin Kol

19 October 2020 5	Galatasaray	1–2	Alanyaspor	Istanbul
20:00 TRT	Falcao 34' (pen.); Etebo (yellow card) 30' (yellow-red card) 45'; Marcão (yellow card) 42'; Belhanda (yellow card) 67'; Fatih (yellow card) 83'	Report	Babacar 43'; Davidson 90+6'; Babacar (yellow card) 21'; Salih (yellow card) 52'; Siopis (yellow card) 79'	Stadium: Türk Telekom Stadium; Attendance: 0 Referee: Tugay Kaan Numanoğlu; Assistant referees: Mustafa Emre Eyisoy, Mustafa Savranlar; Fourth official: Yiğit Arslan

24 October 2020 6	Erzurumspor	1–2	Galatasaray	Erzurum
19:00 TRT	Novikovas 45' (pen.)	Report	Emre 20'; Falcao 64'; Falcao (yellow card) 6' (yellow-red card) 73'; Ömer (yellow card) 70'; Arda (yellow card) 77'	Stadium: Kazım Karabekir Stadium; Attendance: 0 Referee: Arda Kardeşler; Assistant referees: Aleks Taşcıoğlu, Volkan Ahmet Narinç; Fourth official: Hakan Ceylan

31 October 2020 7	Galatasaray	1–0	Ankaragücü	Istanbul
19:00 TRT	Babel 45'; Emre (yellow card) 90'	Report		Stadium: Türk Telekom Stadium; Attendance: 0 Referee: Ali Şansalan; Assistant referees: Ali Saygın Ögel, Mehmet Cem Hanoğlu; Fourth official: Caner Ak

8 November 2020 8	Sivasspor	1–2	Galatasaray	Sivas
19:00 TRT	Fajr (penalty missed); Caner 76'	Report	Belhanda 19'; Arda 48'; Taylan (yellow card) 45+5'; Babel (yellow card) 52'; Okan (yellow card) 90+7'	Stadium: 4 Eylül Stadium; Attendance: 0 Referee: Abdulkadir Bitigen; Assistant referees: Kemal Yılmaz, Ceyhun Sesigüzel; Fourth official: Sarper Barış Saka

23 November 2020 9	Galatasaray	1–1	Kayserispor	Istanbul
19:30 TRT	Emre Akbaba (yellow card) 40'; Diagne 46' (pen.)	Report	Fernandes (yellow card) 48'; Muğdat (yellow card) 20' (yellow-red card) 62'; Campanharo 71'; Behich (yellow card) 78'	Stadium: Türk Telekom Stadium; Attendance: 0 Referee: Turgut Doman; Assistant referees: İsmail Şencan, Süleyman Özay; Fourth official: Caner Ak

28 November 2020 10	Çaykur Rizespor	0–4	Galatasaray	Rize
19:00 TRT	Baiano (yellow card) 23'; Melnjak (yellow card) 44'; Emir (yellow card) 44'; Morozyuk (yellow card) 64'; Boldrin (yellow card) 9' (yellow-red card) 77'	Report	Diagne 45', 52', 79'; Fatih (yellow card) 78'; Taylan 87'	Stadium: Yeni Rize Şehir Stadium; Attendance: 0 Referee: Atilla Karaoğlan; Assistant referees: Serkan Ok, Serkan Çimen; Fourth official: Kutluhan Bilgiç

5 December 2020 11	Galatasaray	3–0	Hatayspor	Istanbul
19:00 TRT	Diagne (yellow card) 9' (goal) 32'; Marcão (yellow card) 59'; Pablo 64' (o.g.); Emre Taşdemir (yellow card) 69'; Kerem 90'	Report	Gökhan (yellow card) 74' (yellow-red card) 80'	Stadium: Türk Telekom Stadium; Attendance: 0 Referee: Erkan Özdamar; Assistant referees: Kemal Yılmaz, Abdullah Bora Özkara; Fourth official: Bülent Birincioğlu

12	Bye

18 December 2020 13	Fatih Karagümrük	2–1	Galatasaray	Istanbul
19:00 TRT	Ndao 46'; Sobiech (yellow card) 62'; Alparslan (yellow card) 76'; Ramazan (yellow card) 84'; Koray (yellow card) 90+4'; Mevlüt 90+5'; Viviano (yellow card) 90+5'; Roco (yellow card) 90+9' (yellow-red card) 90+9'	Report	Donk (yellow card) 43'; Diagne 46' (pen.); Arda (yellow card) 69'; Ömer (yellow card) 90+1'; Ali Yavuz (yellow card) 90+7'; Marcão (red card) 90+14'	Stadium: Atatürk Olympic Stadium; Attendance: 0 Referee: Mustafa Öğretmenoğlu; Assistant referees: Serkan Ok, Murat Ergin Gözütok; Fourth official: Çağdaş Altay

22 December 2020 14	Galatasaray	3–1	Göztepe	Istanbul
19:00 TRT	Emre Kılınç 4'; Arda 12'; Elabdellaoui (yellow card) 58'; Feghouli 63'	Report	Soner 14'; Nwobodo (yellow card) 84'	Stadium: Türk Telekom Stadium; Attendance: 0 Referee: Mete Kalkavan; Assistant referees: Kerem Ersoy, Samet Çavuş; Fourth official: Yasin Kol

25 December 2020 15	Trabzonspor	0–2	Galatasaray	Trabzon
19:00 TRT	Flávio (yellow card) 35'; Abdülkadir (yellow card) 42'	Report	Taylan (yellow card) 14'; Elabdellaoui (yellow card) 24'; Arda 44'; Oğulcan 55'; Ömer (yellow card) 76'	Stadium: Şenol Güneş Stadium; Attendance: 0 Referee: Halil Umut Meler; Assistant referees: Mustafa Emre Eyisoy, İlker Takpak; Fourth official: Koray Gençerler

2 January 2021 16	Galatasaray	0–0	Antalyaspor	Istanbul
19:00 TRT	Emre Kılınç (red card) 51'; Marcão (yellow card) 55'; Arda (yellow card) 81'	Report	Fredy (yellow card) 69'; Hakan (yellow card) 80'; Ersan (yellow card) 90+3'; Gökdeniz (yellow card) 90+5'	Stadium: Türk Telekom Stadium; Attendance: 0 Referee: Abdulkadir Bitigen; Assistant referees: İbrahim Çağlar Uyarcan, Volkan Ahmet Narinç; Fourth official: Serkan Tokat

5 January 2021 17	Konyaspor	4–3	Galatasaray	Konya
19:00 TRT	Jevtović (yellow card) 34'; Daci 41', 46'; Abdülkerim (yellow card) 77'; Uğur 82' (pen.); Kravets 90+2'	Report	Ömer (yellow card) 39'; Donk (yellow card) 44'; Diagne 45+2', 77' (pen.); Oğulcan 90+5'	Stadium: Konya Büyükşehir Stadium; Attendance: 0 Referee: Arda Kardeşler; Assistant referees: Ali Saygın Ögel, Özgür Ertem; Fourth official: Ramazan Keleş

9 January 2021 18	Galatasaray	6–0	Gençlerbirliği	Istanbul
19:00 TRT	Diagne 1'; Belhanda 30', 44', 45+1'; Çağlayan 64'; Ryan Babel 67' (pen.)	Report	Ayité (yellow card) 25'; Polomat (yellow card) 29'; Piris Da Motta (yellow card) 69'	Stadium: Türk Telekom Stadium; Attendance: 0 Referee: Halis Özkahya; Assistant referees: Cevdet Kömürcüoğlu, İbrahim Bozbey; Fourth official: Emre Malok

17 January 2021 19	Beşiktaş	2–0	Galatasaray	Istanbul
19:00 TRT	Rosier (yellow card) 22'; Ghezzal (yellow card) 64'; Souza 79'; Nkoudou 90+1'	Report	Arda (yellow card) 13'; Oğulcan (yellow card) 33'; Diagne (red card) 58'	Stadium: Vodafone Park; Attendance: 0 Referee: Cüneyt Çakır; Assistant referees: Bahattin Duran, Tarık Ongun; Fourth official: Halis Özkahya

20 January 2021 20	Galatasaray	6–1	Denizlispor	Istanbul
19:00 TRT	Taylan (yellow card) 5'; Emre 9'; Feghouli 17'; Donk 45+1'; Muhammet 60' (o.g.); Belhanda 64'; Sekidika 90+1'	Report	Rodallega (yellow card) 30'; Tusha 48'	Stadium: Türk Telekom Stadium; Attendance: 0 Referee: Suat Arslanboğa; Assistant referees: Abdullah Bora Özkara, Volkan Ahmet Narinç; Fourth official: Onur Özütoprak

24 January 2021 21	Yeni Malatyaspor	0–1	Galatasaray	Malatya
16:00 TRT	Tetteh (yellow card) 65'; Chebake (yellow card) 88'; Ahmed (yellow card) 90+1'	Report	Taylan (yellow card) 81'; Babel 88' (yellow card) 90'	Stadium: Malatya Arena; Attendance: 0 Referee: Ali Palabıyık; Assistant referees: Kemal Yılmaz, Erdinç Sezertam; Fourth official: Bülent Birincioğlu

29 January 2021 22	Gaziantep	1–2	Galatasaray	Gaziantep
19:00 TRT	Djilobodji (yellow card) 86'; Maxim 90+7' (pen.)	Report	Onyekuru 51', 79'; Muslera (yellow card) 90+6'; Saracchi (yellow card) 100'	Stadium: New Gaziantep Stadium; Attendance: 0 Referee: Mete Kalkavan; Assistant referees: Ceyhun Sesigüzel, Serkan Ok; Fourth official: Murat Erdoğan

2 February 2021 23	Galatasaray	3–0	Başakşehir	Istanbul
19:00 TRT	Marcão (yellow card) 21'; Onyekuru 45'; Donk 64'; Mohamed 90+2' (pen.)	Report	Giuliano (penalty missed); Crivelli (yellow card) 40'; Deniz (yellow card) 43'	Stadium: Türk Telekom Stadium; Attendance: 0 Referee: Arda Kardeşler; Assistant referees: Ali Saygın Ögel, Serkan Olguncan; Fourth official: Emre Malok

6 February 2021 24	Fenerbahçe	0–1	Galatasaray	Istanbul
19:00 TRT	Mert (yellow card) 17'; Caner (yellow card) 90+8'	Report	Saracchi (yellow card) 28'; Mohamed 54'; Linnes (yellow card) 81'	Stadium: Şükrü Saracoğlu Stadium; Attendance: 0 Referee: Cüneyt Çakır; Assistant referees: Bahattin Duran, Tarık Ongun; Fourth official: Hüseyin Göçek

14 February 2021 25	Galatasaray	2–1	Kasımpaşa	Istanbul
16:00 TRT	Kerem 9'; Mohamed 89' (pen.)	Report	Thelin (yellow card) 15' (goal) 51'; Hajradinović (yellow card) 71'; Varga (yellow card) 82'; Tošić (yellow card) 84'	Stadium: Türk Telekom Stadium; Attendance: 0 Referee: Erkan Özdamar; Assistant referees: Serkan Ok, Mustafa Sönmez; Fourth official: Kutluhan Bilgiç

20 February 2021 26	Alanyaspor	0–1	Galatasaray	Alanya
19:00 TRT	Babacar (yellow card) 33'; Salih (yellow card) 59'; Tzavellas (yellow card) 65'	Report	Emre Kılınç 18'	Stadium: Bahçeşehir Okulları Stadium; Attendance: 0 Referee: Zorbay Küçük; Assistant referees: Kerem Ersoy, İbrahim Çağlar Uyarcan; Fourth official: Kadir Sağlam

27 February 2021 27	Galatasaray	2–0	Erzurumspor	Istanbul
19:00 TRT	Mohamed 38' 45' (yellow card) 79'; Etebo (yellow card) 23'; Taylan (yellow card) 81'	Report	Teikeu (yellow card) 47'; Chahechouhe (yellow card) 63'; El Kabir (yellow card) 90'	Stadium: Türk Telekom Stadium; Attendance: 0 Referee: Mete Kalkavan; Assistant referees: Ceyhun Sesigüzel, Kemal Yılmaz; Fourth official: Yasin Kol

3 March 2021 28	Ankaragücü	2–1	Galatasaray	Ankara
19:00 TRT	Atila (yellow card) 27'; Šarlija (yellow card) 36'; Lobzhanidze 55' (yellow card) 64'; İbrahim 45+1' (yellow card) 71'; Kitsiou (yellow card) 90+1'	Report	Yedlin (yellow card) 33'; Mohamed (red card) 57'; Etebo (yellow card) 64'; Marcão (yellow card) 77'; Babel (yellow card) 90+2'; Kerem 90+2'	Stadium: Eryaman Stadium; Attendance: 0 Referee: Halil Umut Meler; Assistant referees: Mustafa Emre Eyisoy, Cevdet Kömürcüoğlu; Fourth official: Direnç Tonusluoğlu

7 March 2021 29	Galatasaray	2–2	Sivasspor	Istanbul
19:00 TRT	Falcao 14' 68' (pen.); Belhanda (yellow card) 58'; Muslera (yellow card) 63'; Marcão (yellow card) 63'	Report	Gradel 9' (yellow card) 32' (yellow-red card) 90+6'; Boyd 38'; Yatabaré (yellow card) 43'; Ali (yellow card) 81'; Kayode (yellow card) 90+5'	Stadium: Türk Telekom Stadium; Attendance: 0 Referee: Ali Şansalan; Assistant referees: İbrahim Çağlar Uyarcan, Özgür Ertem; Fourth official: Sarper Barış Saka

13 March 2021 30	Kayserispor	0–3	Galatasaray	Kayseri
19:00 TRT	Uğur (yellow card) 41'; Muhar (yellow card) 76'	Report	Taylan (yellow card) 35'; Falcao 43'; Onyekuru 81' 89'	Stadium: Kadir Has Stadium; Attendance: 0 Referee: Halis Özkahya; Assistant referees: Hakan Yemişken, İbrahim Bozbey; Fourth official: Burak Şeker

19 March 2021 31	Galatasaray	3–4	Çaykur Rizespor	Istanbul
19:00 TRT	Yedlin 14' (yellow card) 52' (yellow-red card) 78'; Emre Akbaba 31'; Luyindama (yellow card) 45+3'; Yassine Meriah 74' (o.g.); Marcão (yellow card) 88'	Report	Samudio 2'; Selim (yellow card) 35'; Boldrin 41'; Morozyuk (yellow card) 45+1'; Škoda 54' (pen.); Fernando 90+3'	Stadium: Türk Telekom Stadium; Attendance: 0 Referee: Volkan Bayarslan; Assistant referees: Serkan Olguncan, Ali Saygın Ögel; Fourth official: Kutluhan Bilgiç

3 April 2021 32	Hatayspor	3–0	Galatasaray	Antakya
19:00 TRT	Diouf 21' 72'; Ribeiro 29'; Yusuf (yellow card) 36'; Mesut (yellow card) 52'; Kamara (yellow card) 52'; David (yellow card) 57'; Aabid (yellow card) 64'; Popov (red card) 79'	Report	Arda (yellow card) 24'; Şener (yellow card) 62'	Stadium: Hatay New Stadium; Attendance: 0 Referee: Abdulkadir Bitigen; Assistant referees: Aleks Taşcıoğlu, Erdem Bayık; Fourth official: Atilla Karaoğlan

33	Bye

10 April 2021 34	Galatasaray	1–1	Fatih Karagümrük	Istanbul
19:00 TRT	Mohamed (yellow card) 16'; Emre Akbaba (yellow card) 41'; Babel 62' (yellow card) 83'; Donk (red card) 79'; Fernandes (yellow card) 90'	Report	Roco (yellow card) 57'; Ndao 60'; Viviano (yellow card) 69'	Stadium: Türk Telekom Stadium; Attendance: 0 Referee: Ali Palabıyık; Assistant referees: Serkan Olguncan, Erdinç Sezertam; Fourth official: Sarper Barış Saka

17 April 2021 35	Göztepe	1–3	Galatasaray	İzmir
19:00 TRT	Diabaté 9'; Nwobodo (yellow card) 71'	Report	Kerem 19' 39' (yellow card) 45' (goal) 64' (pen.)	Stadium: Gürsel Aksel Stadium; Attendance: 0 Referee: Fırat Aydınus; Assistant referees: Aleks Taşcıoğlu, Erdem Bayık; Fourth official: Caner Ak

21 April 2021 36	Galatasaray	1–1	Trabzonspor	Istanbul
19:00 TRT	Marcão (yellow card) 56'; Emre Akbaba 90+5'	Report	Bakasetas (yellow card) 60'; Vitor Hugo (yellow card) 65'; Edgar (yellow card) 28' (goal) 76'	Stadium: Türk Telekom Stadium; Attendance: 0 Referee: Mete Kalkavan; Assistant referees: Ceyhun Sesigüzel, Süleyman Özay; Fourth official: Koray Gençerler

24 April 2021 37	Antalyaspor	0–1	Galatasaray	Antalya
20:30 TRT	Podolski (yellow card) 26' (yellow-red card) 59'; Mert (yellow card) 33'; Nuri (yellow card) 82'; Naldo (yellow card) 88'; Kudryashov (yellow card) 90+7' (yellow-red card) 90+7'	Report	Mohamed 77'; Arda (yellow card) 79'	Stadium: New Antalya Stadium; Attendance: 0 Referee: Mete Kalkavan; Assistant referees: Ceyhun Sesigüzel, Süleyman Özay; Fourth official: Burak Pakkan

28 April 2021 38	Galatasaray	1–0	Konyaspor	Istanbul
20:30 TRT	Emre Akbaba 87'	Report	Kravets (yellow card) 20'; Barış (yellow card) 73'	Stadium: Türk Telekom Stadium; Attendance: 0 Referee: Cüneyt Çakır; Assistant referees: Bahattin Duran, Tarık Ongun; Fourth official: Abdullah Buğra Taşkınsoy

2 May 2021 39	Gençlerbirliği	0–2	Galatasaray	Ankara
20:30 TRT	Lima (yellow card) 52'	Report	Fernandes (yellow card) 38'; Halil 44'; Emre Akbaba 53'	Stadium: Eryaman Stadium; Attendance: 0 Referee: Halis Özkahya; Assistant referees: İlker Takpak, İbrahim Bozbey; Fourth official: Mustafa Kürşad Filiz

8 May 2021 40	Galatasaray	3–1	Beşiktaş	Istanbul
20:30 TRT	Babel (yellow card) 7' (goal) 12'; Marcão (yellow card) 15'; Donk (yellow card) 41'; Falcao 45+1' (pen.); Onyekuru (yellow card) 63'; Arda 76'	Report	Souza (yellow card) 30'; Ghezzal 42' (pen.); Nsakala (yellow card) 43'; Hutchinson (yellow card) 44'	Stadium: Türk Telekom Stadium; Attendance: 0 Referee: Cüneyt Çakır; Assistant referees: Bahattin Duran, Tarık Ongun; Fourth official: Hüseyin Göçek

11 May 2021 41	Denizlispor	1–4	Galatasaray	Denizli
20:30 TRT	Sakıb (yellow card) 42'; Rodallega (yellow card) 43' (yellow-red card) 85'; Murawski (yellow card) 45'; Recep 62'; Emirhan (yellow card) 82'; Mešanović (yellow card) 85'	Report	Halil 24'; Babel 35' (pen.); Mohamed 87' (pen.) 89'	Stadium: Denizli Atatürk Stadium; Attendance: 0 Referee: Abdulkadir Bitigen; Assistant referees: Özgür Ertem, Mustafa Savranlar; Fourth official: Yasin Kol

15 May 2021 42	Galatasaray	3–1	Yeni Malatyaspor	Istanbul
20:30 TRT	Halil 53'; Babel 61'; Oğulcan 90+3'	Report	Adem 39'	Stadium: Türk Telekom Stadium; Attendance: 0 Referee: Cüneyt Çakır; Assistant referees: Mustafa Emre Eyisoy, Tarık Ongun; Fourth official: Kutluhan Bilgiç

=== Turkish Cup ===
15 December 2020 Fifth Round	Galatasaray	1–0	Darıca Gençlerbirliği	Istanbul
21:00 TRT	Belhanda 44' (pen.)	Report	Ahmet (yellow card) 27'; İbrahim (yellow card) 69'	Stadium: Türk Telekom Stadium; Attendance: 0 Referee: Direnç Tonusluoğlu; Assistant referees: Hüseyin Emre Çelimli, Emir Eray Eyisoy; Fourth official: Bayram Başkan

12 January 2021 Round of 16	Yeni Malatyaspor	1–1 (a.e.t.) (6–7 p)	Galatasaray	Malatya
20:45 TRT	Hadebe (yellow card) 90'; Umut 102'; Chebake (yellow card) 119'	Report	Luyindama 119'	Stadium: Malatya Arena; Attendance: 0 Referee: Özgür Yankaya; Assistant referees: Serkan Ok, İsmail Şencan; Fourth official: Caner Ak
	Penalties
	Ahmed (penalty scored); Lukoki (penalty scored); Chebake (penalty scored); Mustafa (penalty missed); Ndayishimiye (penalty scored); Wallace (penalty scored); Murat (penalty scored); Jetmir (penalty missed)		(penalty scored) Taylan; (penalty scored) Ömer; (penalty scored) Oğulcan; (penalty scored) Diagne; (penalty missed) Kerem; (penalty scored) Marcão; (penalty scored) Etebo; (penalty scored) Emre

10 February 2021 Quarter-finals	Galatasaray	2–3	Alanyaspor	Istanbul
20:45 TRT	Mohamed 83'; Marcão (yellow card) 90+2'; Fernandes 90+4'	Report	Babacar 31' 48' (pen.); Salih 41'; Mustafa (yellow card) 79'; Siopis (yellow card) 80'; Fatih (yellow card) 86'	Stadium: Türk Telekom Stadium; Attendance: 0 Referee: Abdulkadir Bitigen; Assistant referees: Mehmet Kısal, Mustafa Savranlar; Fourth official: Mustafa Kürşad Filiz

=== UEFA Europa League ===
17 September 2020 Second qualifying round	Neftçi (Azerbaijan)	1–3	(Turkey) Galatasaray	Baku, Azerbaijan
18:00	Ibara (yellow card) 18'; Alaskarov (yellow card) 35'; Mbodj 47'; Kane (yellow card) 69'; Krivotsyuk (yellow card) 87'; Bougrine (yellow card) 89'	Report	Diagne 19', 63'; Luyindama 48'; Feghouli (yellow card) 54'; Saracchi (yellow card) 90+2'	Stadium: Eighth Kilometer District Stadium; Attendance: 0 Referee: Kevin Clancy (Scotland)

24 September 2020 Third qualifying round	Galatasaray (Turkey)	2–0	(Croatia) Hajduk Split	Istanbul, Turkey
21:00	Belhanda 77'; Babel 86'; Ömer (yellow card) 37'	Report		Stadium: Türk Telekom Stadium; Attendance: 0 Referee: Craig Pawson

1 October 2020 Play-off round	Rangers (Scotland)	2–1	(Turkey) Galatasaray	Glasgow, Scotland
21:45	Arfield 52'; Tavernier 59'	Report	Marcão 87'; Elabdellaoui (yellow card) 29'; Belhanda (yellow card) 65'	Stadium: Ibrox Stadium; Attendance: 0 Referee: Andris Treimanis

=== Overall ===
As of 15 May 2021

	Total	Home	Away	Neutral
Games played	46	23	23	0
Games won	30	14	16	0
Games drawn	6	6	0	0
Games lost	10	3	7	0
Biggest win	6–0 vs Gençlerbirliği	6–0 vs Gençlerbirliği	4–0 vs Çaykur Rizespor	-
Biggest loss	4–3 vs Konyaspor; 4–3 vs Çaykur Rizespor	4–3 vs Çaykur Rizespor	4–3 vs Konyaspor	-
Biggest win (League)	6–0 vs Gençlerbirliği	6–0 vs Gençlerbirliği	4–0 vs Çaykur Rizespor	-
Biggest win (Cup)	1–0 vs Darıca Gençlerbirliği	1–0 vs Darıca Gençlerbirliği	-	-
Biggest win (UEFA)	3–1 vs Neftçi	2–0 vs Hajduk Split	3–1 vs Neftçi	-
Biggest loss (League)	4–3 vs Konyaspor	2–1 vs Alanyaspor	4–3 vs Konyaspor	-
Biggest loss (Cup)	3–2 vs Alanyaspor	3–2 vs Alanyaspor	-	-
Biggest loss (UEFA)	2–1 vs Rangers	-	2–1 vs Rangers	-
Clean sheets	19	10	9	-
Goals scored	90	50	40	-
Goals conceded	43	20	23	-
Goal difference	+47	+30	+17	-
Average GF per game	1.96	2.17	1.74	-
Average GA per game	0.93	0.87	1	-
Yellow cards	80	41	39	-
Red cards	8	4	4	-
Most appearances	(Brazil) Marcão (42)	(Brazil) Marcão (21)	(Turkey) Emre Kılınç (21) (Brazil) Marcão (21)	-
Most minutes played	(Brazil) Marcão (3795)	(Brazil) Marcão (1875)	(Brazil) Marcão (1920)	-
Most goals	(Senegal) Mbaye Diagne (11)	(Colombia) Radamel Falcao (6) (Morocco) Younes Belhanda (6)	(Senegal) Mbaye Diagne (8)	-
Most assists	(Netherlands) Ryan Babel (5) (Turkey) Emre Kılınç (5)	(Netherlands) Ryan Babel (2) (Turkey) Emre Kılınç (2)	(Netherlands) Ryan Babel (3) (Turkey) Emre Kılınç (3)	-
Points	96	48	48	-
Winning rate	65.22%	60.87%	69.57%	-
