= Taylan Antalyalı =

Turkish footballer (born 1995)

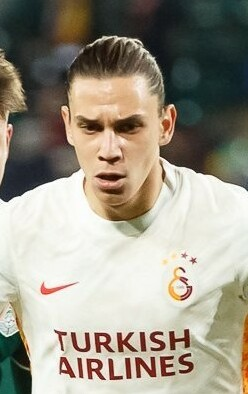
- Antalyalı playing for Galatasaray in 2021

Personal information
- Date of birth: 8 January 1995 (age 31)
- Place of birth: Yatağan, Turkey
- Height: 1.80 m (5 ft 11 in)
- Position: Central midfielder

Team information
- Current team: Çaykur Rizespor
- Number: 14

Youth career
- 2006–2009: Muğlaspor
- 2009–2012: Bucaspor

Senior career*
Years	Team	Apps	(Gls)
2012–2014	Bucaspor	39	(1)
2014–2017	Gençlerbirliği	2	(0)
2016	→ Kayseri Erciyesspor (loan)	13	(1)
2016–2017	→ Hacettepe (loan)	27	(2)
2017–2019	BB Erzurumspor	64	(10)
2019–2025	Galatasaray	72	(2)
2022–2023	→ Ankaragücü (loan)	30	(3)
2023–2024	→ Samsunspor (loan)	26	(2)
2024–2025	→ Bodrum (loan)	24	(1)
2025–	Çaykur Rizespor	28	(0)

International career^{‡}
2009–2010	Turkey U15	5	(1)
2011	Turkey U16	12	(4)
2011–2012	Turkey U17	11	(5)
2012–2013	Turkey U18	5	(0)
2013–2014	Turkey U19	8	(1)
2014–2015	Turkey U20	3	(0)
2021–2022	Turkey	9	(0)
- * Club domestic league appearances and goals as of 1 June 2026 ‡ National team caps and goals as of 22:41, 8 February 2026 (UTC)

Taylan Antalyalı (born 8 January 1995) is a Turkish professional footballer who plays as a central midfielder for Süper Lig club Çaykur Rizespor. He made nine appearances for the Turkey national team.

== Club career ==
=== Gençlerbirliği ===
Antalyalı was transferred to the Super League team Gençlerbirliği before the 2014–15 season. He made his professional debut in a 4–1 Süper Lig loss to Trabzonspor on 1 December 2014. He played only two times in Super League during its first season with this team but no game in the second season. So he was put on loan and joined the Kayseri Erciyesspor on 1 February 2016 en 1. Lig. He played 13 matches and scored one time. The next season, he was again put on loan for another team, Hacettepe SK playing 27 games in this 2. Lig team and scoring 2 goals.

=== Erzurumspor ===
On 1 August 2017, Antalyalı signed a three-year contract with BB Erzurumspor, joining on a free transfer. During this 1. Lig 2017–18 season he played 27 matches, scored 2 times and participated in the 6th place of the team qualifying it to the play-off. He played the three matches of the play-off, scoring during the first one and participating in the victory of its team in the Final against Gaziantep SK.

The Super League was difficult for the team while Antalyali played 31 match and scored 6 times. Erzurumspor was relegated to the 1.Lig.

=== Galatasaray ===
Antalyali began the next season in the 1. Lig for three match before being transferred to Galatasaray. He signed a four-year contract with Galatasaray in the 2019–20 season for €1 million.

On 8 September 2022, he signed a one-year loan contract with Süper Lig team Ankaragücü.

On 25 July 2023, he signed a one-year loan contract with Süper Lig team Samsunspor.

On 7 September 2024, it was announced that Antalyali was loaned to Bodrum until the end of the 2024–25 season.

== International career ==
Antalyali made his debut for Turkey national team on 24 March 2021 in a World Cup qualifier against Netherlands.

He was subsequently selected to participate in the UEFA Euro 2020. However, with a record of three losses in three games, eight goals scored and one goal scored, Turkey is eliminated from the first round of the competition.

== Career statistics ==
=== Club ===
As of 17 June 2024

Appearances and goals by club, season and competition
Club	Season	League			Cup		Continental		Other		Total	
Club	Season	Division	Apps	Goals	Apps	Goals	Apps	Goals	Apps	Goals	Apps	Goals
Bucaspor	2011–12	TFF First League	1	0	—		—		—		1	0
Bucaspor	2012–13	TFF First League	9	0	1	0	—		—		10	0
Bucaspor	2013–14	TFF First League	29	1	4	0	—		—		33	1
Bucaspor	Total		39	1	5	0	0	0	0	0	44	1
Gençlerbirliği	2014–15	Süper Lig	2	0	6	0	—		—		8	0
Gençlerbirliği	2015–16	Süper Lig	0	0	1	0	—		—		1	0
Gençlerbirliği	Total		2	0	7	0	0	0	0	0	9	0
Kayseri Erciyesspor (loan)	2015–16	TFF First League	13	1	0	0	—		—		13	1
Hacettepe (loan)	2016–17	TFF Second League	27	2	1	0	—		—		28	2
Erzurumspor	2017–18	TFF First League	30	3	3	0	—		—		33	3
Erzurumspor	2018–19	Süper Lig	31	6	1	0	—		—		32	6
Erzurumspor	2019–20	TFF First League	3	1	0	0	—		—		3	1
Erzurumspor	Total		64	10	4	0	0	0	0	0	68	10
Galatasaray	2019–20	Süper Lig	15	1	5	0	—		—		20	1
Galatasaray	2020–21	Süper Lig	34	1	2	0	3 (Note: Appearance(s) in UEFA Europa League)	0	—		39	1
Galatasaray	2021–22	Süper Lig	30	0	1	0	11	0	—		42	0
Galatasaray	2022–23	Süper Lig	1	0	0	0	—		—		1	0
Galatasaray	Total		80	2	8	0	14	0	—		102	2
MKE Ankaragücü (loan)	2022–23	Süper Lig	30	3	2	0	—		—		32	3
Samsunspor (loan)	2023–24	Süper Lig	26	2	0	0	—		—		26	2
Career total			281	21	27	0	14	0	0	0	322	21

=== International ===
Appearances and goals by national team and year
National team	Year	Apps	Goals
Turkey	2021	8	0
Turkey	2022	1	0
Total		9	0
