= Marcão (footballer, born 1996) =

Brazilian footballer

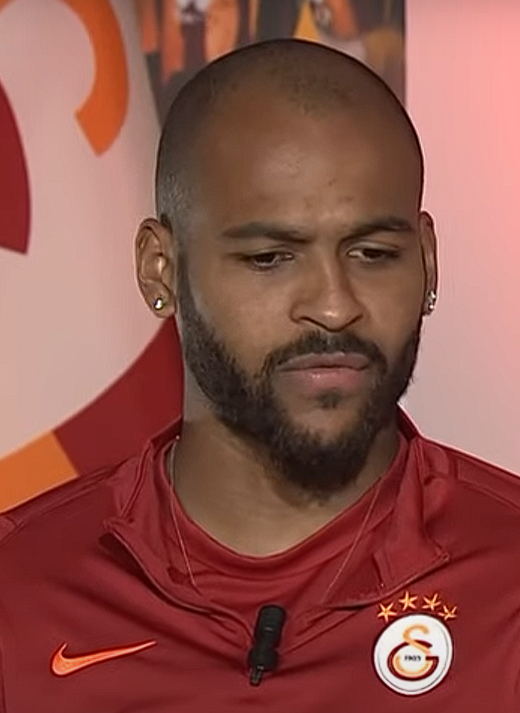
- Marcão with Galatasaray in 2021

Personal information
- Full name: Marcos do Nascimento Teixeira
- Date of birth: 5 June 1996 (age 30)
- Place of birth: Londrina, Brazil
- Height: 1.85 m (6 ft 1 in)
- Position: Centre-back

Team information
- Current team: Sevilla
- Number: 23

Youth career
- Avaí
- 2014–2015: Atlético Paranaense

Senior career*
Years	Team	Apps	(Gls)
2014	Avaí	0	(0)
2015–2018	Atlético Paranaense	23	(1)
2015	→ Guaratinguetá (loan)	8	(0)
2016	→ Ferroviária (loan)	14	(0)
2017	→ Atlético Goianiense (loan)	1	(0)
2017–2018	→ Rio Ave (loan)	20	(0)
2018–2019	Chaves	17	(2)
2019–2022	Galatasaray	106	(0)
2022–	Sevilla	37	(0)
- * Club domestic league appearances and goals as of 20 December 2025

Marcos do Nascimento Teixeira (born 5 June 1996), commonly known as Marcão, is a Brazilian professional footballer who plays as a centre-back for La Liga club Sevilla.

== Career ==
=== Avaí ===
Marcão was born in Londrina, Paraná, and started his career with Avaí. He made his senior debut on 12 April 2014 at the age of 17, starting in a 4–1 Campeonato Catarinense away loss against Chapecoense.

=== Atlético Paranaense ===
Marcão subsequently moved to Atlético Paranaense, and made his debut for the club on 5 February 2015 by starting in a 3–1 loss at Rio Branco for the Campeonato Paranaense championship.

=== Guaratinguetá (loan) ===
On 31 July 2015, he was loaned to Série C club Guaratinguetá, after a partnership between both clubs was established.

=== Ferroviária (loan) ===
On 15 December 2015, Marcão was loaned to Ferroviária, along with other Atlético teammates. After being a regular starter he returned to Furacão, now being definitely assigned to the first team.

Marcão made his Série A debut on 26 June 2016, coming on as a late substitute for Nikão in a 2–0 home win against Grêmio.

=== Galatasaray ===
==== 2018–19 season ====
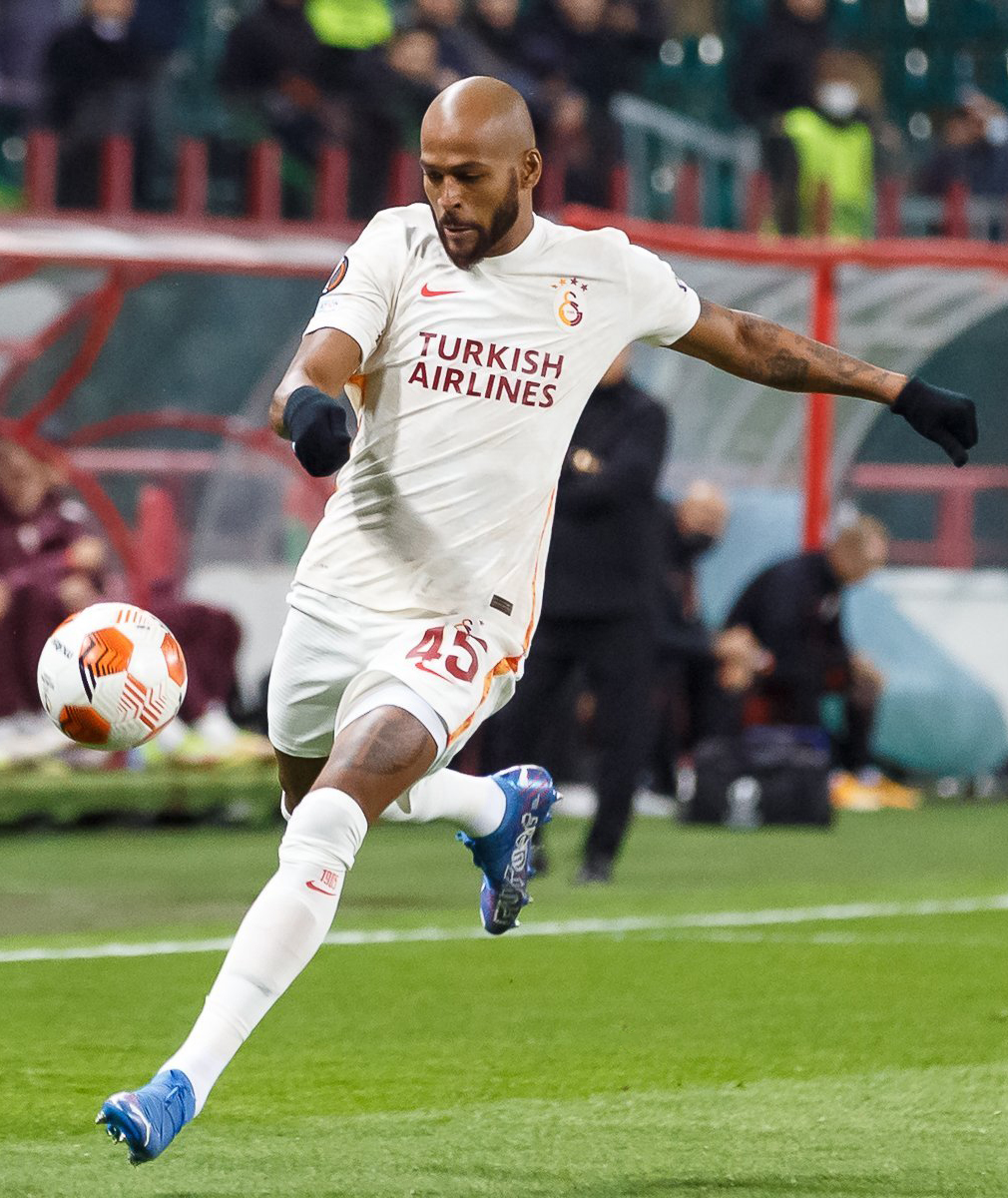
Marcão with Galatasaray in 2021.

On 14 January 2019, Marcão moved to Turkish side Galatasaray on a three-and-a-half-year contract for an initial fee of €4 million. He played his first official match with Galatasaray in the 18th week of the 2018–19 season, in the Ankaragücü match, which was played at Türk Telekom Stadium and Galatasaray won 6–0. Marcão, who started the match in the starting 11, remained on the field for 90 minutes.

After being included in the team, he played for 90 minutes in all ten league matches. He could not play in the Fenerbahçe derby, the 28th week of the league, due to a card penalty.

With the Benfica match he played on 14 February 2019, he made his first UEFA Europa League match of his career. He finished the year with 21 matches, 15 of which were in the Super League. When the season was completed, he won his first Super League and Turkish Cup championship with Galatasaray.

==== 2019–20 season ====
He started the 2019–20 football year with the Denizlispor match in the first week. In the 34th and 43rd times of the match, he was repeatedly banned from the game by receiving a yellow card. He could not find the opportunity to play in the second week due to his penalty. While he played for 90 minutes in the next seven matches, he missed the 10th week Çaykur Rizespor match again due to his penalty. He played in the UEFA Champions League for the first time with the Club Brugge match on 18 September 2019.

He stayed on the field for 90 minutes in all six matches played by Galatasaray football team in the Champions League. He finished the season with a total of 39 matches, 28 of which were league games. In addition, he won the TFF Super Cup for the first time in his career with the Akhisar Belediyespor match played on 7 August 2019 and Galatasaray won 3–1. A centre-back, Marcão wore only Galatasaray jersey in the super league.

==== 2020–21 season ====
While Galatasaray lost the league championship with goal difference, Marcão became the most stable player of the Yellow-Red team in the Super League throughout the season. The Brazilian football player stayed on the field for 3325 minutes in 37 matches, all of them in the first 11.

==== 2021–22 season ====
On 22 May 2021, Galatasaray extended Marcão's contract for two more years. The club announced the official announcement. During the game against Giresunspor on 16 August 2021, he was sent off for headbutting and punching his teammate Kerem Aktürkoğlu.

=== Sevilla ===
On 8 July 2022, Sevilla announced the signing of Marcão on a five-year contract subject to a medical.

== Personal life ==
His older brother Dionatan was also a professional footballer before he died of a heart attack at the age of 25. Marcão is married and has two children. His wife, Pamela Teixeira, successfully overcame breast cancer, completing her final chemotherapy session in October 2025.

== Career statistics ==
As of match played 20 December 2025

Appearances and goals by club, season and competition
Club	Season	League			National cup (Note: Includes Copa do Brasil, Taça de Portugal, Turkish Cup and Copa del Rey)		League cup (Note: Includes Taça da Liga)		Continental		Other		Total	
Club	Season	Division	Apps	Goals	Apps	Goals	Apps	Goals	Apps	Goals	Apps	Goals	Apps	Goals
Avaí	2014	Série B	0	0	0	0	—		—		1 (Note: Appearance in Campeonato Catarinense)	0	1	0
Athletico Paranaense	2015	Série A	0	0	0	0	—		—		5 (Note: Appearances in Campeonato Paranaense)	0	5	0
Athletico Paranaense	2016	Série A	12	0	0	0	—		—		0	0	12	0
Athletico Paranaense	2017	Série A	1	1	0	0	—		0	0	5	0	6	1
Athletico Paranaense	Total		13	1	0	0	—		0	0	10	0	23	1
Guaratinguetá (loan)	2015	Série C	8	0	0	0	—		—		—		8	0
Ferroviária (loan)	2016	Série D	0	0	4	0	—		—		14 (Note: Appearances in Campeonato Paulista)	0	18	0
Atlético Goianiense (loan)	2017	Série A	1	0	0	0	—		—		—		1	0
Rio Ave (loan)	2017–18	Primeira Liga	20	0	1	0	4	1	—		—		25	1
Chaves	2018–19	Primeira Liga	17	2	2	0	4	1	—		—		23	3
Galatasaray	2018–19	Süper Lig	15	0	4	0	—		2 (Note: Appearances in UEFA Europa League)	0	—		21	0
Galatasaray	2019–20	Süper Lig	28	0	4	0	—		6 (Note: Appearances in UEFA Champions League)	0	1 (Note: Appearance in Turkish Super Cup)	0	39	0
Galatasaray	2020–21	Süper Lig	37	0	2	0	—		3	1	—		42	1
Galatasaray	2021–22	Süper Lig	26	0	1	0	—		12 (Note: Two appearances in UEFA Champions League, ten appearances and one goal in UEFA Europa League)	1	—		39	1
Galatasaray	Total		106	0	11	0	—		23	2	1	0	141	2
Sevilla	2022–23	La Liga	5	0	0	0	—		6 (Note: Three appearances in UEFA Champions League, three appearances in UEFA Europa League)	0	—		11	0
Sevilla	2023–24	La Liga	7	0	3	1	—		0	0	0	0	10	1
Sevilla	2024–25	La Liga	12	0	3	0	—		—		—		15	0
Sevilla	2025–26	La Liga	13	0	0	0	—		—		—		13	0
Sevilla	Total		37	0	6	1	—		6	0	0	0	49	1
Career total			202	3	24	1	8	2	29	2	26	0	289	8

== Honours ==
Galatasaray

- Süper Lig: 2018–19
- Turkish Cup: 2018–19
- Turkish Super Cup: 2019

Sevilla

- UEFA Europa League: 2022–23

Individual

- Super Lig Defender of the Season: 2019–20
- Süper Lig Team of the Season: 2020–21
