= Ali Yavuz Kol =

Turkish footballer

Personal information
- Date of birth: 29 January 2001 (age 25)
- Place of birth: Antalya, Turkey
- Height: 1.75 m (5 ft 9 in)
- Position: Forward

Team information
- Current team: Kasımpaşa
- Number: 11

Youth career
- 2013: Kemerspor
- 2013–2014: Antalyaspor
- 2014–2018: Galatasaray

Senior career*
Years	Team	Apps	(Gls)
2018–2022	Galatasaray	4	(0)
2019–2020	→ Tarsus İdman Yurdu (loan)	26	(9)
2021	→ Denizlispor (loan)	8	(0)
2021–2022	→ Ankara Keçiörengücü (loan)	25	(3)
2022–2025	Adana Demirspor	28	(1)
2022–2023	→ 24 Erzincanspor (loan)	34	(3)
2023–2024	→ Esenler Erokspor (loan)	36	(9)
2025–	Kasımpaşa	24	(0)

International career^{‡}
2015	Turkey U14	3	(2)
2015–2016	Turkey U15	11	(2)
2016–2017	Turkey U16	10	(4)
2017–2018	Turkey U17	16	(4)
2018–2019	Turkey U18	16	(2)
2019–2020	Turkey U19	10	(3)
- * Club domestic league appearances and goals as of 10 June 2026 ‡ National team caps and goals as of 8 November 2025

Ali Yavuz Kol (born 29 January 2001) is a Turkish professional footballer who plays as a forward for Süper Lig club Kasımpaşa.

== Club career ==
Kol is a youth product for Galatasaray, and joined Tarsus İdman Yurdu on loan for the 2019–20 season. Kol made his professional debut with Galatasaray in a 1-1 Süper Lig tie with Kayserispor on 23 November 2020.

=== Denizlispor (loan) ===
On 27 January 2021, Denizlispor one of the Süper Lig teams, tied Ali Yavuz Kol, who plays for Galatasaray, to his colors until the end of the 2020-21 season.

=== Ankara Keçiörengücü (loan) ===
On 27 August 2021, Galatasaray announced that the 20-year-old football player was loaned to Ankara Keçiörengücü, one of the TFF First League teams, until the end of the season.

=== Adana Demirspor ===
On 14 July 2022, it was announced that he signed a 2+2 year contract with Adana Demirspor.
