= Yunus Emre Yalçın =

Turkish footballer (born 1994)

Personal information
- Date of birth: 12 September 1994 (age 32)
- Place of birth: Konak, Turkey
- Height: 1.74 m (5 ft 9 in)
- Position: Attacking midfielder

Team information
- Current team: Vanspor FK
- Number: 23

Youth career
- 2005–2012: Atillaspor
- 2012–2013: Konyaspor

Senior career*
Years	Team	Apps	(Gls)
2013–2017	Konyaspor	1	(0)
2014–2015	→ Konya Selçukspor (loan)	23	(2)
2015–2016	→ Bayburt İdarespor (loan)	35	(2)
2016–2017	→ İstanbulspor (loan)	33	(5)
2017–2022	İstanbulspor	6	(0)
2018	→ Sakaryaspor (loan)	11	(1)
2018–2019	→ Gümüşhanespor (loan)	9	(0)
2020–2021	→ Kırklarelispor (loan)	31	(5)
2021–2022	→ Bayburt Özel İdarespor (loan)	35	(3)
2023	Etimesgut Belediyespor	1	(0)
2023–	Vanspor FK	2	(0)
- * Club domestic league appearances and goals as of 23 September 2023

Yunus Emre Yalçın (born 12 September 1994) is a Turkish footballer who plays for Vanspor FK. He made his Süper Lig debut on 16 May 2014.
