= Okan Kocuk =

Turkish professional footballer (born 1995)

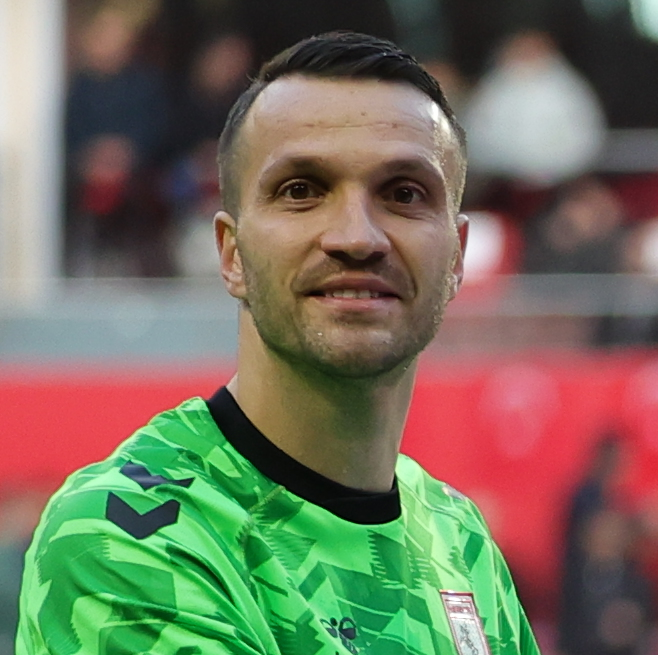

Personal information
- Full name: Okan Kocuk
- Date of birth: July 27, 1995 (age 31)
- Place of birth: Mustafakemalpaşa, Turkey
- Height: 1.88 m (6 ft 2 in)
- Position: Goalkeeper

Team information
- Current team: Samsunspor
- Number: 1

Youth career
- 2006–2008: Kemalpaşaspor
- 2008–2015: Bursaspor

Senior career*
Years	Team	Apps	(Gls)
2015–2019	Bursaspor	23	(0)
2016–2017	→ Bandırmaspor (loan)	23	(0)
2017–2018	→ İstanbulspor (loan)	34	(0)
2019–2023	Galatasaray	19	(0)
2021–2022	→ Giresunspor (loan)	32	(0)
2023–	Samsunspor	111	(0)

International career^{‡}
2011	Turkey U16	2	(0)
2011–2012	Turkey U17	5	(0)
2012–2013	Turkey U18	5	(0)
2014	Turkey U19	1	(0)
2014–2015	Turkey U20	2	(0)
2015–2016	Turkey U21	5	(0)
2024–	Turkey	0	(0)
- * Club domestic league appearances and goals as of 18 October 2026 ‡ National team caps and goals as of 15 March 2024

Okan Kocuk (born 27 July 1995) is a Turkish professional footballer who plays as a goalkeeper for the Turkish club Samsunspor in the Süper Lig.

== Professional career ==
Kocuk made his professional debut for Bursaspor in a 2-1 Süper Lig win over Mersin İdmanyurdu on 1 March 2015. In 2016 Kocuk was loaned to Bandırmaspor, and in 2017 was loaned to İstanbulspor.

=== Galatasaray ===
On 18 July 2019, Kocuk joined Galatasaray on a four-year contract on a free signing.

==== Giresunspor (loan) ====
On 9 July 2021, Galatasaray announced that goalkeeper Kocuk was loaned to Giresunspor, the new team of the Süper Lig, until the end of the season.

==== Return to Galatasaray ====
Kocuk became the champion in the Süper Lig in the 2022–23 season with the Galatasaray team. Defeating Ankaragücü 4-1 away in the match played in the 36th week on 30 May 2023, Galatasaray secured the lead with 2 weeks before the end and won the 23rd championship in its history.

On 19 June 2023, it was announced that he left Galatasaray and a thank you message was published.

=== Samsunspor ===
On 19 June 2023, it was announced that he signed a 3-year contract with Samsunspor. Kocuk kept the most clean sheets in the 2024–25 Süper Lig, with 14, as Samsunspor finished the league in third place.

== International career ==
Kocuk is a youth international for Turkey at all youth levels In November 2017, Kocuk was called up to the senior Turkey national football team but did not make an appearance.

== Career statistics ==
As of match played 18 October 2026

Appearances and goals by club, season and competition
Club	Season	League			Cup		Europe		Other		Total	
Club	Season	Division	Apps	Goals	Apps	Goals	Apps	Goals	Apps	Goals	Apps	Goals
Bursaspor	2013–14	Süper Lig	0	0	0	0	—		—		0	0
Bursaspor	2014–15	Süper Lig	1	0	4	0	0	0	—		5	0
Bursaspor	2015–16	Süper Lig	0	0	1	0	—		0	0	1	0
Bursaspor	2018–19	Süper Lig	22	0	0	0	—		—		22	0
Bursaspor	Total		23	0	5	0	0	0	0	0	28	0
Bandırmaspor (loan)	2016–17	TFF 1. Lig	23	0	2	0	—		—		25	0
İstanbulspor (loan)	2017–18	TFF 1. Lig	34	0	3	0	—		—		37	0
Galatasaray	2019–20	Süper Lig	9	0	4	0	0	0	0	0	13	0
Galatasaray	2020–21	Süper Lig	10	0	1	0	0	0	—		11	0
Galatasaray	2022–23	Süper Lig	2	0	3	0	—		—		5	0
Galatasaray	Total		21	0	8	0	0	0	0	0	29	0
Giresunspor (loan)	2021–22	Süper Lig	32	0	0	0	—		—		32	0
Samsunspor	2023–24	Süper Lig	36	0	0	0	—		—		36	0
Samsunspor	2024–25	Süper Lig	36	0	0	0	—		—		36	0
Samsunspor	2025–26	Süper Lig	31	0	2	0	12	0	1	0	46	0
Samsunspor	2026–27	Süper Lig	8	0	0	0	—		—		8	0
Samsunspor	Total		111	0	2	0	12	0	1	0	126	0
Career total			254	0	20	0	12	0	1	0	277	0

== Honours ==
Galatasaray

- Süper Lig: 2022–23
- Turkish Super Cup: 2019
