= Oğulcan Çağlayan =

Turkish footballer

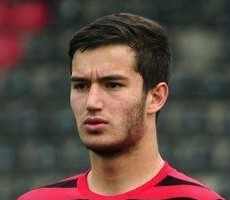
- Çağlayan with Gaziantepspor in 2014

Personal information
- Date of birth: 22 March 1996 (age 30)
- Place of birth: Ankara, Turkey
- Height: 1.88 m (6 ft 2 in)
- Positions: Forward; winger

Team information
- Current team: Kayserispor
- Number: 71

Youth career
- 2001–2002: Bahçelerüstü Spor
- 2002–2005: Ankaraspor
- 2005–2006: Bursa Merinosspor
- 2006–2009: Bursaspor

Senior career*
Years	Team	Apps	(Gls)
2013–2014	Gaziantepspor	15	(2)
2014–2016	Kayseri Erciyesspor	12	(3)
2015–2016	→ Kayserispor (loan)	25	(1)
2016–2020	Çaykur Rizespor	75	(8)
2018–2019	→ Gazişehir Gaziantep (loan)	31	(5)
2020–2023	Galatasaray	21	(4)
2022	→ Eyüpspor (loan)	13	(3)
2022–2023	→ Giresunspor (loan)	8	(0)
2023	→ Pendikspor (loan)	11	(0)
2023–2024	Gaziantep	7	(0)
2024	Kasımpaşa	16	(0)
2024–2025	Kocaelispor	40	(21)
2025–2026	Çorum	16	(3)
2026	Vanspor	13	(0)
2026–	Kayserispor	7	(0)

International career^{‡}
2012	Turkey U16	10	(9)
2012	Turkey U17	6	(1)
2014	Turkey U18	1	(0)
2014–2015	Turkey U19	10	(2)
2015–2017	Turkey U21	16	(2)
- * Club domestic league appearances and goals as of 25 October 2026 ‡ National team caps and goals as of 23 January 2021

Oğulcan Çağlayan (born 22 March 1996) is a Turkish footballer who plays as a forward for TFF 1. Lig club Kayserispor. He made his Süper Lig debut on 14 February 2014.

== Club career ==
=== Gaziantepspor ===
Oğulcan Çağlayan played 15 games with Gaziantepspor since 2013 and scored 2 goals. Oğulcan scored his first league goal by a bicycle kick on 4 October 2014 against Kasımpaşa. However, Gaziantepspor lost the game 4–2.

=== Kayseri Erciyesspor ===
On 2 February 2015, Oğulcan had been transferred to Kayseri Erciyesspor. Oğulcan Çağlayan had played 11 games in the second half of the Süper Lig: 2014–15 Süper Lig and was able to score 3 goals. His first goal was against Sivasspor in the 15th minute. Oğulcan received a pass from Ethem Pülgir and was able to pass the two defenders to finish the play with a goal. However this wasn’t enough for Erciyesspor to win the game and lost 3–2 to Sivasspor. On 8 May 2015, Björn Vleminckx drops the ball inside the box with a header and Oğulcan Çağlayan rushes inside the box to score with a wonder volley kick to score against Mersin İdman Yurdu in the 43rd minute. The game was drawn 2-2 at the full time. On 23 May 2015, Kasımpaşa goalkeeper Ertaç Özbir made a huge mistake by trying to kick the ball from his goal end but the ball ended up in the foot of Oğulcan and he was able to control the ball very smoothly and cracked two players to score the third goal for Erciyesspor. However, this wasn’t enough for the win and game ended up 3-3 fulltime.

=== Galatasaray ===
On 11 August 2020, he signed a 4-year contract with Galatasaray. The contract is set to expire on 31 May 2024. Galatasaray scored his first goal on the road against Trabzonspor on 26 December 2020.

==== Eyüpspor ====
On 8 February 2022, Çağlayan was loaned to TFF First League club Eyüpspor for the rest of the season.

==== Giresunspor (loan) ====
On 8 September 2022, he signed a 1-year loan contract with Süper Lig team Giresunspor.

In the statement made by Oğulcan club Galatasaray on 16 January 2023, it was stated that the rental contract with Giresunspor has been mutually terminated.

==== Pendikspor (loan) ====
On 16 January 2023, he signed a 6-month temporary contract with Pendikspor.

== Career statistics ==
As of 17 June 2021

=== Club ===
Club	Season	League	League		Cup		Europe		Other		Total	
Club	Season	League	Apps	Goals	Apps	Goals	Apps	Goals	Apps	Goals	Apps	Goals
Gaziantepspor	2013–14	Süper Lig	4	0	0	0	—		—		4	0
Gaziantepspor	2014–15	Süper Lig	11	2	5	1	—		—		16	3
Gaziantepspor	Total		15	2	5	1	—		—		20	3
Kayseri Erciyesspor	2014–15	Süper Lig	11	3	0	0	—		—		11	3
Kayseri Erciyesspor	2015–16	TFF First League	1	0	0	0	—		—		1	0
Kayseri Erciyesspor	Total		12	3	0	0	—		—		12	3
Kayserispor (loan)	2015–16	Süper Lig	25	1	9	2	—		—		34	3
Kayserispor (loan)	Total		25	1	9	2	—		—		34	3
Çaykur Rizespor	2016–17	Süper Lig	25	1	6	2	—		—		31	3
Çaykur Rizespor	2017–18	TFF First League	27	4	0	0	—		—		27	4
Çaykur Rizespor	2018–19	Süper Lig	1	0	0	0	—		—		1	0
Çaykur Rizespor	2019–20	Süper Lig	22	3	2	1	—		—		24	4
Çaykur Rizespor	Total		75	8	8	3	—		—		83	11
Gazişehir Gaziantep (loan)	2018–19	TFF First League	31	5	1	1	—		—		32	6
Gazişehir Gaziantep (loan)	Total		31	5	1	1	—		—		32	6
Galatasaray	2020–21	Süper Lig	18	4	2	0	0	0	—		20	4
Galatasaray	2021–22	Süper Lig	0	0	0	0	0	0	0	0	0	0
Galatasaray	Total		18	4	2	0	0	0	0	0	20	4
Career total			176	23	25	7	0	0	0	0	201	30
