= Valentine Ozornwafor =

Nigeria football player

Personal information
- Full name: Valentine James Ozornwafor
- Date of birth: 1 June 1999 (age 27)
- Place of birth: Nsukka, Nigeria
- Height: 1.94 m (6 ft 4 in)
- Position: Centre back

Team information
- Current team: Septemvri Sofia
- Number: 26

Youth career
- Brown Ideye Challenge
- 2017–2019: Enyimba

Senior career*
Years	Team	Apps	(Gls)
2019	Enyimba	2	(0)
2019–2022	Galatasaray	1	(0)
2019–2020	→ Almería (loan)	4	(0)
2021–2022	→ Charleroi (loan)	17	(0)
2022–2024	Charleroi	3	(0)
2022–2023	→ Sochaux (loan)	3	(0)
2022–2023	→ Sochaux II (loan)	1	(0)
2023	Zébra Élites	8	(1)
2025–	Septemvri Sofia	28	(2)

International career^{‡}
2019	Nigeria U20	7	(0)
2019	Nigeria U23	3	(0)
2021–	Nigeria	2	(0)
- * Club domestic league appearances and goals as of 26 May 2026 ‡ National team caps and goals as of 02:21, 6 June 2021 (UTC)

Valentine James Ozornwafor (born 1 June 1999) is a Nigerian professional footballer who plays as a central defender for Bulgarian First League club Septemvri Sofia.

== Club career ==
Ozonwafor joined Enyimba in 2017, after impressing while playing for a local side in a friendly against the club. He made his first team debut on 3 March, in a 0–0 away draw against Bendel Insurance, and played his second match on 17 March, in a draw at Sunshine Stars for the same scoreline.

=== Galatasaray ===
On 28 June 2019, it was announced that Ozornwafor signed a four-year deal with Galatasaray, for a rumoured fee of €300,000.

=== UD Almería (loan) ===
On 22 August, he joined Spanish club UD Almería on loan for the 2019-20 season. Ozornwafor made his league debut on 6 October 2019, coming on as a second-half substitute for Jonathan in a 0–0 away draw against Deportivo de La Coruña.

=== Charleroi ===
In the statement made by the Galatasaray club on 21 August 2021, "An agreement has been reached with Charleroi for the temporary transfer of our professional football player Ozornwafor for one year. We wish our player success in his new club."

=== Sochaux (loan) ===
Following the loan, Charleroi acquired Ozornwafor's rights and loaned him to Sochaux in France on 8 July 2022. On 31 January 2023, the loan was terminated early.

== International career ==
Ozornwafor represented Nigeria at under-20 level in the 2019 Africa U-20 Cup of Nations and in the 2019 FIFA U-20 World Cup. He was first called up to the full side in March 2019, for a friendly game against Seychelles and Egypt, but was only an unused substitute. He debuted with Nigeria in a 1–0 friendly loss to Cameroon on 4 June 2021.

== Honours ==
Galatasaray

- Süper Kupa: 2019
