= Emre Kılınç =

Turkish footballer (born 1994)

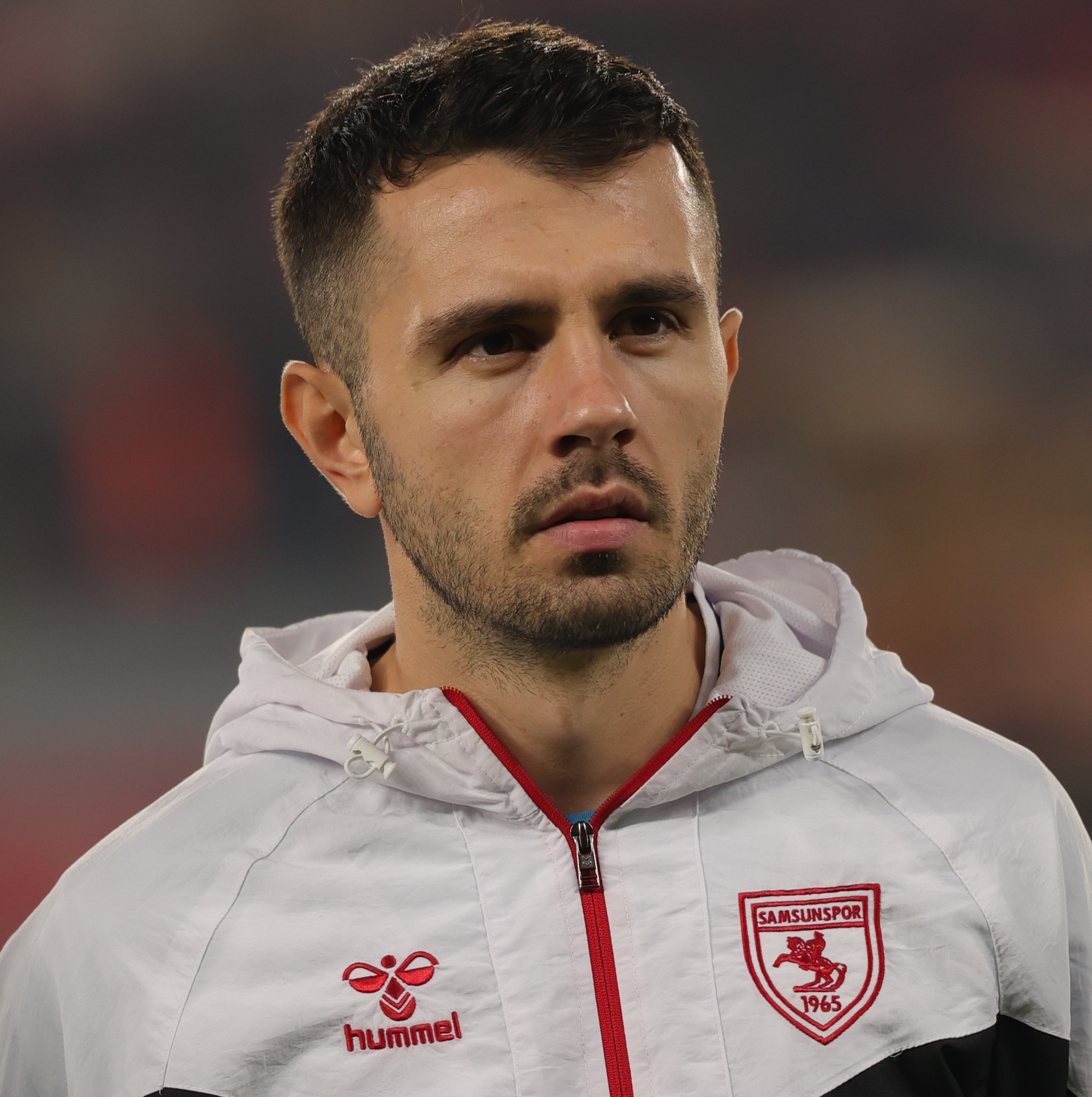
- Kılınç with Samsunspor in 2025

Personal information
- Full name: Emre Kılınç
- Date of birth: 23 August 1994 (age 32)
- Place of birth: Adapazarı, Turkey
- Height: 1.74 m (5 ft 9 in)
- Position: Winger

Team information
- Current team: Samsunspor
- Number: 11

Youth career
- 2007–2009: Sakarya Akademikspor
- 2009–2011: Boluspor

Senior career*
Years	Team	Apps	(Gls)
2011–2017	Boluspor	125	(20)
2017–2020	Sivasspor	107	(22)
2020–2023	Galatasaray	56	(7)
2022–2023	→ Ankaragücü (loan)	26	(2)
2023–	Samsunspor	81	(9)

International career^{‡}
2012	Turkey U19	2	(0)
2014	Turkey U20	1	(0)
2015	Turkey U21	2	(0)
2019–	Turkey	4	(0)
- * Club domestic league appearances and goals as of 17 August 2026 ‡ National team caps and goals as of 17 June 2021

Emre Kılınç (born 23 August 1994) is a Turkish professional footballer who plays as a winger for Samsunspor.

== Professional career ==
=== Sivasspor ===
Emre signed for Sivasspor after five successful seasons for Boluspor in the TFF First League.

Emre made his professional debut for Sivasspor in a 1–0 Süper Lig loss to Akhisar Belediyespor on 12 August 2017.

=== Galatasaray ===
He signed a four-season agreement with Galatasaray on 12 August 2020.

==== Ankaragücü (loan) ====
On 8 September 2022, he signed a 1-year loan contract with Süper Lig team Ankaragücü.

=== Samsunspor ===
On 4 August 2023, he signed a 3-year contract with Samsunspor, the new team of the Süper Lig.

== International career ==
Emre debuted for the Turkey national football team in a 1–0 UEFA Euro 2020 qualifying win over Andorra on 7 September 2019.

== Career statistics ==
As of 2 August 2022

=== Club ===
Club	Season	League	League		Cup		Europe		Other		Total	
Club	Season	League	Apps	Goals	Apps	Goals	Apps	Goals	Apps	Goals	Apps	Goals
Boluspor	2011–12	TFF First League	4	0	1	0	—		—		5	0
Boluspor	2012–13	TFF First League	12	2	1	0	—		—		13	2
Boluspor	2013–14	TFF First League	31	3	0	0	—		—		31	3
Boluspor	2014–15	TFF First League	32	10	0	0	—		—		32	10
Boluspor	2015–16	TFF First League	30	3	6	2	—		—		36	5
Boluspor	2016–17	TFF First League	16	2	0	0	—		—		16	2
Boluspor	Total		125	20	8	2	0	0	0	0	133	22
Sivasspor	2016–17	TFF First League	15	5	5	1	—		—		20	6
Sivasspor	2017–18	Süper Lig	33	2	3	0	—		—		36	2
Sivasspor	2018–19	Süper Lig	31	7	1	0	—		—		32	7
Sivasspor	2019–20	Süper Lig	28	8	3	1	—		—		31	9
Sivasspor	Total		107	22	12	2	0	0	0	0	119	24
Galatasaray	2020–21	Süper Lig	35	4	3	0	3	0	—		41	4
Galatasaray	2021–22	Süper Lig	27	3	1	0	9	2	0	0	37	5
Galatasaray	Total		62	7	4	0	12	2	0	0	78	9
Career total			294	49	24	4	12	2	0	0	330	55

=== International ===
Turkey national team
Year	Apps	Goals
2019	2	0
2020	2	0
2021	0	0
Total	4	0
