= Emre Taşdemir =

Turkish footballer

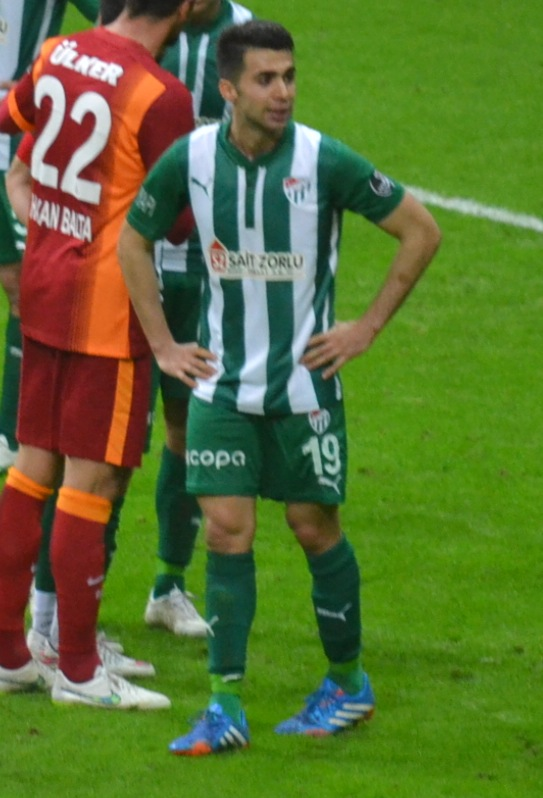
- Taşdemir playing for Bursaspor in 2015

Personal information
- Date of birth: 8 August 1995 (age 31)
- Place of birth: Yenimahalle, Ankara, Turkey
- Height: 1.70 m (5 ft 7 in)
- Position: Left back

Team information
- Current team: Mardin 1969
- Number: 33

Youth career
- 2007–2009: Şekerspor
- 2009–2010: Ankaraspor
- 2010–2013: MKE Ankaragücü

Senior career*
Years	Team	Apps	(Gls)
2013–2014	MKE Ankaragücü	30	(6)
2014–2019	Bursaspor	47	(1)
2019–2023	Galatasaray	25	(1)
2020	→ Kayserispor (loan)	10	(0)
2021–2022	→ Giresunspor (loan)	18	(0)
2023–2024	Pendikspor	12	(0)
2024–2025	Gaziantep	15	(1)
2025–2026	Kasımpaşa	5	(0)
2026–	Mardin 1969	6	(0)

International career^{‡}
2010	Turkey U15	2	(0)
2011	Turkey U16	11	(0)
2011–2012	Turkey U17	6	(0)
2013–2014	Turkey U19	7	(1)
2014	Turkey U20	3	(0)
2014–2016	Turkey U21	2	(0)
2015–	Turkey	5	(0)
- * Club domestic league appearances and goals as of 15 October 2026 ‡ National team caps and goals as of 15 January 2021

Emre Taşdemir (born 8 August 1995) is a Turkish professional footballer who plays as a left back for TFF 1. Lig club Mardin 1969 and the Turkey national team.

== Club career ==
=== Ankaragücü ===
On 3 March 2013, Taşdemir made his league debut with MKE Ankaragücü against Bucaspor.

=== Bursaspor ===
In 2014, he joined Bursaspor. He made his debut for his new club on 29 October 2014 in a cup game against Tepecik B.S.

=== Galatasaray ===
On 9 January 2019, Emre joined Turkish club Galatasaray.

==== Kayserispor (loan) ====
On 23 January 2020, Galatasaray loaned Taşdemir, a defensive player, to Kayserispor until the end of the 2019–20 season.

==== Giresunspor (loan) ====
On 19 August 2021, Giresunspor added left-back player Taşdemir from Galatasaray on loan until the end of the season.

==== Return to Galatasaray ====
Akgün became the champion in the Süper Lig in the 2022–23 season with the Galatasaray team. Defeating Ankaragücü 4-1 away in the match played in the 36th week on 30 May 2023, Galatasaray secured the lead with 2 weeks before the end and won the 23rd championship in its history.

On 21 June 2023, it was announced that he left Galatasaray and a thank you message was published.

=== Pendikspor ===
He signed a contract with Pendikspor on 8 July 2023.

== International career ==
On 8 June 2015, Taşdemir made his debut with the national team in an international friendly fixture against Bulgaria. He played the full game, which resulted in a 4–0 home win.

== Honours ==
Galatasaray

- Süper Lig: 2018–19, 2022–23
- Turkish Cup: 2018–19
- Turkish Super Cup: 2019

== Career statistics ==
As of 18 June 2021

=== Club ===
Club	Season	League	League		Cup		Europe		Other		Total	
Club	Season	League	Apps	Goals	Apps	Goals	Apps	Goals	Apps	Goals	Apps	Goals
Ankaragücü	2012–13	TFF First League	6	0	0	0	—		—		6	0
Ankaragücü	2013–14	TFF Second League	24	6	1	1	—		—		25	7
Ankaragücü	Total		30	6	1	1	0	0	0	0	31	7
Bursaspor	2014–15	Süper Lig	13	0	12	0	—		—		25	0
Bursaspor	2015–16	Süper Lig	22	0	5	1	—		1	0	28	1
Bursaspor	2016–17	Süper Lig	6	1	1	0	—		—		7	1
Bursaspor	2017–18	Süper Lig	5	0	0	0	—		—		5	0
Bursaspor	2018–19	Süper Lig	1	0	0	0	—		—		1	0
Bursaspor	Total		47	1	18	1	0	0	1	0	66	2
Galatasaray	2018–19	Süper Lig	7	0	3	0	0	0	0	0	10	0
Galatasaray	2019–20	Süper Lig	6	0	1	0	0	0	0	0	7	0
Galatasaray	2020–21	Süper Lig	9	0	2	0	1	0	0	0	12	0
Galatasaray	2021–22	Süper Lig	0	0	0	0	0	0	0	0	0	0
Galatasaray	Total		22	0	6	0	1	0	0	0	29	0
Kayserispor (loan)	2019–20	Süper Lig	10	0	0	0	—		—		10	0
Kayserispor (loan)	Total		10	0	0	0	0	0	0	0	10	0
Career total			109	7	25	2	1	0	1	0	136	9

=== International ===
Turkey national team
Year	Apps	Goals
2015	4	0
2016	0	0
2017	0	0
2018	0	0
2019	1	0
2020	0	0
2021	0	0
Total	5	0

== Personal life ==
Taşdemir is of Kurdish descent and married Merve İrem Cingil in July 2020.
