= Mustafa Kapı =

Turkish footballer

Personal information
- Date of birth: 8 August 2002 (age 24)
- Place of birth: Denizli, Turkey
- Height: 1.75 m (5 ft 9 in)
- Position: Midfielder

Team information
- Current team: İskenderunspor
- Number: 19

Youth career
- 2013–2014: Denizlispor
- 2014–2020: Galatasaray

Senior career*
Years	Team	Apps	(Gls)
2018–2020	Galatasaray	1	(0)
2020–2022	Lille II	6	(1)
2022–2024	Adana Demirspor	3	(0)
2024–2025	Kastamonuspor 1966	15	(1)
2025–	İskenderunspor	13	(1)

International career^{‡}
2015	Turkey U14	3	(0)
2015–2016	Turkey U15	11	(1)
2016–2018	Turkey U16	15	(1)
2016–2018	Turkey U17	7	(0)
2019–2020	Turkey U18	5	(0)
2019	Turkey U19	3	(0)
- * Club domestic league appearances and goals as of 30 November 2025 ‡ National team caps and goals as of 11 February 2020

Mustafa Kapı (born 8 August 2002) is a Turkish professional footballer who plays as a midfielder for TFF 2. Lig club İskenderunspor.

== Club career ==
=== Galatasaray ===
Kapı made his professional debut with Galatasaray in a 4–2 Süper Lig win over Sivasspor on 23 December 2018. In doing so, Kapı became the youngest footballer in Galatasaray's history, at the age of 16.

=== Lille ===
On 12 September 2020, Lille announced the transfer of Kapı.

=== Adana Demirspor ===
On 7 January 2022, Adana Demirspor announced the transfer of Kapı. He signed on a contract running until 30 June 2025.

== International career ==
Kapı is a youth international for Turkey, having played up to the Turkey U18s.

== Honours ==
Galatasaray

- Süper Lig: 2018–19
