= 2018–19 Galatasaray S.K. season =

Galatasaray
2018–19 season
- President: Mustafa Cengiz
- Head coach: Fatih Terim
- Stadium: Türk Telekom Stadium
- Süper Lig: 1st
- Turkish Cup: Winners
- Turkish Super Cup: Runners-up
- UEFA Champions League: Group stage
- UEFA Europa League: Round of 32
- Top goalscorer: League: Henry Onyekuru (14); All: Henry Onyekuru (16)
- Highest home attendance: 51,578 vs Beşiktaş (Süper Lig, 5 May 2019)
- Lowest home attendance: 4,844 vs Keçiörengücü (Turkish Cup, 18 December 2018)
- Average home league attendance: 36,439
Home colours	Away colours	Third colours

The 2018–19 season was Galatasaray's 115th in existence and 61st consecutive season in the Süper Lig. The club became Turkish champions for the 22nd time in their history, and won a second consecutive Süper Lig title following their success in the previous season.

In Europe, Galatasaray competed in the UEFA Champions League, as well as the UEFA Europa League, the Turkish Cup and the Turkish Super Cup.

This article shows statistics of the club's players in the season, and also lists all matches that the club played during the season. The season covered a period from 1 July 2018 to 30 June 2019.

== Club ==
=== Technical Staff ===
Position	Staff
Manager	(Turkey) Fatih Terim
Assistant Manager	(Turkey) Ümit Davala
Assistant Manager	(Turkey) Hasan Şaş
Assistant Manager	(Turkey) Levent Şahin
Goalkeeper Coach	(Brazil) Cláudio Taffarel
Assistant Goalkeeper Coach	(Turkey) Fadıl Koşutan
Conditioner	(Italy) Alberto Bartali
Conditioner	(Turkey) Yasin Küçük
Director of football	(Turkey) Şükrü Hanedar
General manager of footballing	(Turkey) Uğur Yıldız
Assistant manager of footballing	(Turkey) Mert Çetin
Head of scouting	(Turkey) Emre Utkucan
Scout	(Turkey) Halil Cihan Ünal
Physiotherapists	(Turkey) Mustafa Korkmaz (Turkey) Burak Koca (Turkey) Samet Polat
Doctors	(Turkey) Dr. Yener İnce (Turkey) Dr. İsmail Erman Büyükgök
Academy development	(Turkey) Nedim Yiğit

Last updated: 9 January 2019
Source: Galatasaray SK

=== Board of directors ===
Position	Staff
President	(Turkey) Mustafa Cengiz
Vice-President	(Turkey) Abdürrahim Albayrak
	(Turkey) Murat Ece
	(Turkey) Kaan Kançal
	(Turkey) Dilek Kutlu
	(Turkey) M. Ömer Cansever
	(Turkey) F. Okan Böke
	(Turkey) Yusuf Günay
	(Turkey) Mahmut Recevik
	(Turkey) Emre Erdoğan
	(Turkey) Dorukhan Acar

=== Grounds ===
Ground (capacity and dimensions)	Ali Sami Yen Türk Telekom Stadı (52,223 / 105x68m)
Training ground	Florya Metin Oktay Facilities

=== Kit ===
- Supplier: Nike
- Chest sponsor (Domestic competitions): Nef
- Chest sponsor (European competitions): Turkish Airlines
- Back sponsor: MOOV by Garenta
- Sleeve sponsor: Bilyoner.com
- Short sponsor: Fluo
- Socks sponsor: Jeunesse Global

Home
Away
Third

Goalkeeper 1

Goalkeeper 2

Goalkeeper 3

== Sponsorship ==
Companies that Galatasaray had sponsorship deals with during the season included the following.

Updated October 2018

Licensee	Product
Nef	Main Sponsor
Nike	Technical Sponsor
Ikinciyeni.com	Cosponsor
Fluo	Cosponsor
Jeunesse Global	Cosponsor
Altınyıldız	Cosponsor
Türk Telekom	Cosponsor
Odeabank	Cosponsor
Turkish Airlines	Cosponsor
Denizbank	Cosponsor
Liv Hospital	Cosponsor
Medical Park	Cosponsor
TemSA	Cosponsor
Tacirler Yatırım	Cosponsor
Sci-MX	Cosponsor
Passo Lig	Cosponsor
Diversey	Cosponsor

== Players ==
=== Squad information ===
N	Pos.	Nat.	Name	Age	EU	Since	App	Goals	Ends	Transfer fee	Notes
1	GK	(Uruguay)	Fernando Muslera (VC)	40	EU	2011	326	1	2021	€6.75M + Cana	Second nationality: Italian
2	DF	(Brazil)	Mariano	40	Non-EU	2017	67	2	2020	€4M	
5	DF	(Turkey)	Ahmet Çalık	32	Non-EU	2017	41	3	2021	€2.5M	
8	MF	(Turkey)	Selçuk İnan (C)	41	Non-EU	2011	318	59	2019	Free	
10	MF	(Morocco)	Younès Belhanda	36	EU	2017	70	7	2021	€8M	Second nationality: French
11	FW	(Germany)	Sinan Gümüş (VC)	32	EU	2014	116	33	2019	Free	Second nationality: Turkish
12	GK	(Turkey)	Batuhan Şen	27	Non-EU	2016	0	0	2019	Youth system	
13	GK	(Turkey)	İsmail Çipe	31	Non-EU	2015	8	0	2019	Youth system	
14	DF	(Norway)	Martin Linnes	35	Non-EU	2016	104	5	2021	€2M	
15	MF	(Netherlands)	Ryan Donk	40	EU	2016	83	3	2020	€2.5M	Second nationality: Surinamese
17	MF	(Senegal)	Badou Ndiaye	36	EU	2017	50	4	2019	€0.75M	On loan from Stoke City
19	DF	(Turkey)	Ömer Bayram	35	EU	2018	20	1	2021	€0.4M	Second nationality: Dutch
20	MF	(Turkey)	Emre Akbaba	34	EU	2018	21	3	2022	€4M	Second nationality: French
21	FW	(Nigeria)	Henry Onyekuru	29	Non-EU	2018	44	16	2019	€0.8M	On loan from Everton
22	FW	(Greece)	Kostas Mitroglou	38	EU	2019	9	2	2020	Free	On loan from Marseille
25	MF	(Brazil)	Fernando	39	EU	2017	58	4	2020	€5.25M	Second nationality: Portuguese
26	DF	(Turkey)	Semih Kaya	35	Non-EU	2009	209	5	2019	Free	Originally from Youth system On loan from Sparta Prague
27	DF	(Democratic Republic of the Congo)	Christian Luyindama	32	Non-EU	2019	17	2	2019	€3M	On loan from Standard Liège
33	DF	(Turkey)	Emre Taşdemir	31	Non-EU	2019	10	0	2020	Free	
35	MF	(Turkey)	Yunus Akgün	26	Non-EU	2015	20	1	2019	Youth system	
36	MF	(Turkey)	Atalay Babacan	26	Non-EU	2017	2	1	2020	Youth system	
40	MF	(Turkey)	Gökay Güney	27	Non-EU	2016	6	0	2019	Youth system	
41	MF	(Turkey)	Mustafa Kapı	24	Non-EU	2017	1	0	2020	Youth system	
45	DF	(Brazil)	Marcão	30	Non-EU	2019	21	0	2022	€4M	
47	MF	(Turkey)	Abdussamed Karnuçu	26	Non-EU	2017	1	0	2020	Youth system	
52	MF	(Turkey)	Celil Yüksel	28	Non-EU	2018	5	0	2020	Youth system	
55	DF	(Japan)	Yuto Nagatomo	40	Non-EU	2017	41	1	2020	€2.5M	
88	FW	(Turkey)	Muğdat Çelik	36	Non-EU	2018	18	4	2019	Free	
89	MF	(Algeria)	Sofiane Feghouli	36	EU	2017	71	20	2022	€4.25M	Second nationality: French
91	FW	(Senegal)	Mbaye Diagne	35	Non-EU	2019	17	11	2023	€10M	

- Last updated: 24 May 2019
- Source: Galatasaray.org, Players in / out, Wikipedia players' articles (for EU passport)
- Ordered by Last season starting 11 and position on pitch (from back right to front left).

=== Other players under contract ===
Not eligible to play matches

Note: Flags indicate national team as defined under FIFA eligibility rules; some limited exceptions apply. Players may hold more than one non-FIFA nationality.

No.	Pos.	Nation	Player
9	FW	SUI	Eren Derdiyok

=== Transfers ===
==== In ====
No.	Pos.	Nat.	Name	Age	EU	Moving from	Type	Transfer window	Ends	Transfer fee	Source
23	DF	(France)	Lionel Carole	35	EU	Sevilla (Spain)	Loan return	Summer	2019	Free	
13	GK	(Turkey)	İsmail Çipe	31	Non-EU	Tuzlaspor	Loan return	Summer	2019	Free	
55	DF	(Japan)	Yuto Nagatomo	40	Non-EU	Internazionale (Italy)	Transfer	Summer	2020	€2.5M	Galatasaray.org; Inter.it
88	FW	(Turkey)	Muğdat Çelik	36	Non-EU	Akhisarspor	Transfer	Summer	2019	Free	Galatasaray.org
21	FW	(Nigeria)	Henry Onyekuru	29	Non-EU	Everton (England)	Loan	Summer	2019	€0.8M	Galatasaray.org; Evertonfc.com
20	MF	(Turkey)	Emre Akbaba	34	EU	Alanyaspor	Transfer	Summer	2022	€4.0M	Galatasaray.org
17	MF	(Senegal)	Badou Ndiaye	36	Non-EU	Stoke City (England)	Loan	Summer	2019	€0.75M	Galatasaray.org; Stokecityfc.com
19	DF	(Turkey)	Ömer Bayram	35	EU	Akhisarspor	Transfer	Summer	2021	€0.4M	Galatasaray.org
45	DF	(Brazil)	Marcão	30	Non-EU	Chaves (Portugal)	Transfer	Winter	2022	€4.0M	Galatasaray.org; GDChaves.pt
33	DF	(Turkey)	Emre Taşdemir	31	Non-EU	Bursaspor	Transfer	Winter	2020	Free	Galatasaray.org
26	DF	(Turkey)	Semih Kaya	35	Non-EU	Sparta Prague (Czech Republic)	Loan	Winter	2019	Free	Galatasaray.org; Sparta.cz
91	FW	(Senegal)	Mbaye Diagne	35	Non-EU	Kasımpaşa	Transfer	Winter	2023	€10.0M	Galatasaray.org
22	FW	(Greece)	Kostas Mitroglou	38	EU	Marseille (France)	Loan	Winter	2020	Free	Galatasaray.org; Om.net
27	DF	(Democratic Republic of the Congo)	Christian Luyindama	32	Non-EU	Standard Liège (Belgium)	Loan; With option to buy	Winter	2019	€3M	Galatasaray.org; Standard.be

Total spending: €25.45M ▼

==== Out ====
No.	Pos.	Nat.	Name	Age	EU	Moving to	Type	Transfer window	Transfer fee	Source
90	MF	(Turkey)	Umut Gündoğan	36	EU	Boluspor	Contract expired	Summer	Free	Boluspor.org.tr
22	DF	(Turkey)	Hakan Balta	43	EU	Retired	Contract expired	Summer	Free	
16	GK	(France)	Cédric Carrasso	44	EU	Retired	Contract expired	Summer	Free	
33	DF	(Romania)	Iasmin Latovlevici	40	EU	Bursaspor	Contract expired	Summer	Free	Bursaspor.org.tr
28	DF	(Germany)	Koray Günter	32	EU	Genoa (Italy)	Contract expired	Summer	Free	
64	DF	(Belgium)	Jason Denayer	31	EU	Manchester City (England)	End of Loan	Summer	—	
55	DF	(Japan)	Yuto Nagatomo	40	Non-EU	Internazionale (Italy)	End of Loan	Summer	—	
7	MF	(Turkey)	Yasin Öztekin	39	EU	Göztepe	Contract expired	Summer	Free	Göztepe.org.tr
67	MF	(Turkey)	Eray İşcan	35	Non-EU		Contract expired	Summer	Free	
39	DF	(Belgium)	Luis Pedro Cavanda	35	EU	Standard Liège (Belgium)	Transfer	Summer	€2.4M	Galatasaray.org; Standard.be
—	MF	(Switzerland)	Endoğan Adili	32	EU		Contract termination	Summer	Free	Galatasaray.org
23	DF	(France)	Lionel Carole	35	EU	Strasbourg (France)	Transfer	Summer	€0.75M	Galatasaray.org
6	DF	(Turkey)	Tolga Ciğerci	34	EU	Fenerbahçe	Contract termination	Summer	Free	Fenerbahce.org
18	FW	(France)	Bafétimbi Gomis	41	EU	Al-Hilal (Saudi Arabia)	Transfer	Summer	€6M	Galatasaray.org
7	MF	(Cape Verde)	Garry Rodrigues	35	EU	Al-Ittihad (Saudi Arabia)	Transfer	Winter	€9M	Galatasaray.org; Ittihadfc.com
4	DF	(Turkey)	Serdar Aziz	36	EU	Fenerbahçe	Contract termination	Winter	€2.3M	Galatasaray.org
	DF	(Turkey)	Tarık Çamdal	35	EU		Contract termination	Winter	Free	Galatasaray.org
43	DF	(Turkey)	Ozan Kabak	26	Non-EU	VfB Stuttgart (Germany)	Transfer	Winter	€11M	Galatasaray.org; Vfb.de
3	DF	(Brazil)	Maicon	38	EU	Al-Nassr (Saudi Arabia)	Loan	Winter	€1.7M	Galatasaray.org

Total income: €32.15M ▲

Expenditure: €10.7M ▲

== Pre-season and friendlies ==
Win Draw Loss

13 July 2018 Pre-season	Galatasaray (Turkey)	1–0	(Switzerland) Wil	Zürich
15:00 CET	Derdiyok 32'	Report	Sílvio (yellow card) 38'	Stadium: Utogrund; Referee: (Switzerland) Fedayi San

18 July 2018 Pre-season	Galatasaray (Turkey)	1–3	(Netherlands) PSV	Montreux
19:00 CET	Linnes 65'; Fernando (yellow card) 43'	Report	Bergwijn 65'; Malen 65'; Gakpo 65'	Stadium: Stade De Chailly; Attendance: 300; Referee: (Switzerland) Sven Wolfensberger

21 July 2018 Pre-season	Galatasaray (Turkey)	1–2	(Spain) Valencia	Fribourg
17:30 CET	Onyekuru 69'; Fernando (yellow card) 41'; Donk (yellow card) 52'	Report	Vezo 36'; Lato 52'; Montoya (yellow card) 74'	Stadium: Stade Universitaire Saint-Léonard

25 July 2018 Pre-season	Sakaryaspor	0–3	Galatasaray	Sakarya
19:00 TRT	Berkay (yellow card)	Report	Çelik 6'; Belhanda 21'; Gümüş 42'	Stadium: Atatürk Stadium; Referee: (Turkey) Ümit Öztürk

28 July 2018 Pre-season	Club Africain (Tunisia)	0–1	(Turkey) Galatasaray	Rades
21:00 CET	Mouchili (yellow card) 36'; Abdi (yellow card) 40'; Ifa (yellow card) 42'	Report	Maicon (yellow card) 40'; İnan (yellow card) 70'; Onyekuru 90+4'	Stadium: Stade Olympique de Radès; Attendance: 15,000; Referee: (Tunisia) Youssef eSraïri

31 July 2018 Pre-season	AEK Athens (Greece)	3–2	(Turkey) Galatasaray	Athens
20:00 CET				Stadium: Olympic Stadium

13 October 2018 Friendly	Galatasaray	5–2	Galatasaray U21	Istanbul
N/A	Maicon 2'; Gümüş 25'; Fernando 45'; Kol 88'; Akgün 88'	Report	Sefil 40'; Tuş 85'	Stadium: Florya Metin Oktay Facilities

8 January 2019 Friendly	Galatasaray	3–3	Eskişehirspor	Belek
15:00 TRT	Gümüş 11'; Akgün 24'; Akdari 67' (o.g.)	Report	Öner 22'; Erdoğan 75'; Kızılkaya 84'	Stadium: Sueno Hotels Sports Complex

12 January 2019 Friendly	RB Leipzig (Germany)	1–1	(Turkey) Galatasaray	Leipzig
15:00 CET	Poulsen 34'	Summary	Linnes 55'; İnan (yellow card) 70'; Maicon (yellow card) 73'	Stadium: Red Bull Arena; Attendance: 11,200; Referee: (Germany) Henry Müller

24 March 2019 Friendly	Galatasaray	3–2	Ümraniyespor	Istanbul
N/A	Çelik 60'; Donk 72'; İnan 74' (pen.)	Report	Göksu 28'; Aydın 86' (pen.)	Stadium: Florya Metin Oktay Facilities

27 March 2019 Friendly	Galatasaray	2–0	İstanbulspor	Istanbul
N/A	Akbaba 31'; Gümüş 34'	Report		Stadium: Florya Metin Oktay Facilities

== Competitions ==
Win Draw Loss

=== Overview ===
Competition	First match	Last match	Starting round	Final position	Record							
Competition	First match	Last match	Starting round	Final position	Pld	W	D	L	GF	GA	GD	Win %
Süper Lig	10 August 2018	24 May 2019	Matchday 1	Winners	34	20	9	5	72	36	+36	58.82
Turkish Cup	5 December 2018	16 May 2019	Fifth round	Winners	9	6	2	1	20	10	+10	66.67
Turkish Super Cup	5 August 2018	5 August 2018	Final	Runners-up	1	0	1	0	1	1	+0	0.00
Champions League	18 September 2018	11 December 2018	Group stage	Group stage (3rd)	6	1	1	4	5	8	−3	16.67
Europa League	14 February 2019	21 February 2019	Round of 32	Round of 32	2	0	1	1	1	2	−1	0.00
Total					52	27	14	11	99	57	+42	51.92

Last updated: 19 May 2019.
Source: Competitions

=== Süper Lig ===
==== Standings ====
Pos	Team	Pld	W	D	L	GF	GA	GD	Pts	Qualification or relegation
1	Galatasaray (C)	34	20	9	5	72	36	+36	69	Qualification for the Champions League group stage
2	Başakşehir	34	19	10	5	49	22	+27	67	Qualification for the Champions League third qualifying round
3	Beşiktaş	34	19	8	7	72	46	+26	65	Qualification for the Europa League group stage
4	Trabzonspor	34	18	9	7	64	46	+18	63	Qualification for the Europa League third qualifying round
5	Yeni Malatyaspor	34	13	8	13	47	46	+1	47	Qualification for the Europa League second qualifying round

Source: Süper Lig, Soccerway
Rules for classification: 1) Points; 2) Head-to-head points; 3) Head-to-head goal difference; 4) Head-to-head goals scored; 5) Goal difference; 6) Goals scored; 7) Play-off.
(C) Champions

==== Results summary ====
Overall								Home						Away					
Pld	W	D	L	GF	GA	GD	Pts	W	D	L	GF	GA	GD	W	D	L	GF	GA	GD
34	20	9	5	72	36	+36	69	13	4	0	47	12	+35	7	5	5	25	24	+1

==== Results by round ====
Round	1	2	3	4	5	6	7	8	9	10	11	12	13	14	15	16	17	18	19	20	21	22	23	24	25	26	27	28	29	30	31	32	33	34
Ground	A	H	H	A	H	A	H	A	H	A	H	A	H	A	H	A	H	H	A	A	H	A	H	A	H	A	H	A	H	A	H	A	H	A
Result	W	W	W	L	W	L	W	W	D	L	D	W	D	L	D	D	W	W	W	D	W	W	W	D	W	W	W	D	W	D	W	W	W	L
Position	1	2	1	2	1	2	1	1	1	3	2	2	3	4	7	5	5	2	2	2	2	2	2	2	2	2	2	2	2	2	1	1	1	1

A = Away; H = Home; W = Win; D = Draw; L = Loss

==== Matches ====
10 August 2018 Match 1	Ankaragücü	1–3	Galatasaray	Ankara
21:45 TRT	El Kabir 7'	Report	Aziz 21'; Koné 30' (o.g.); Derdiyok 90'	Stadium: Osmanlı Stadı; Attendance: n/a Referee: Ümit Öztürk

19 August 2018 Match 2	Galatasaray	1–0	Göztepe	Istanbul
21:45 TRT	Onyekuru 42'	Report		Stadium: Türk Telekom Stadı; Attendance: 35,040; Referee: Ali Palabıyık

27 August 2018 Match 3	Galatasaray	6–0	Alanyaspor	Istanbul
21:45 TRT	Fernando 37'; Gümüş 49'; Derdiyok 53'; Akbaba 56', 84'; Onyekuru 82'	Report		Stadium: Türk Telekom Stadı; Attendance: 34,806; Referee: Halil Umut Meler

1 September 2018 Match 4	Trabzonspor	4–0	Galatasaray	Trabzon
21:45 TRT	Onazi 3'; Nwakaeme 25', 45'; Ekuban 90'	Report		Stadium: Şenol Güneş Stadı; Attendance: 36,135; Referee: Fırat Aydınus

14 September 2018 Match 5	Galatasaray	4–1	Kasımpaşa	Istanbul
21:00 TRT	Derdiyok 55'; Rodrigues 58', 65'; Aziz 77'	Report	Diagne 76' (pen.)	Stadium: Türk Telekom Stadı; Attendance: 35,919; Referee: Bülent Yıldırım

23 September 2018 Match 6	Akhisarspor	3–0	Galatasaray	Akhisar
19:00 TRT	Manu 51'; Vural 80'; Yumlu 84'	Report		Stadium: Spor Toto Akhisar Stadı; Attendance: n/a Referee: Yaşar Kemal Uğurlu

28 September 2018 Match 7	Galatasaray	1–0	BB Erzurumspor	Istanbul
20:00 TRT	Maicon 74'	Report		Stadium: Türk Telekom Stadı; Attendance: 31,161; Referee: Alper Ulusoy

6 October 2018 Match 8	Antalyaspor	0–1	Galatasaray	Antalya
19:00 TRT		Report	Donk 87'	Stadium: Antalya Stadı; Attendance: 16,614; Referee: Cüneyt Çakır

19 October 2018 Match 9	Galatasaray	1–1	Bursaspor	Istanbul
20:30 TRT	Derdiyok 77'	Report	Kara 63'	Stadium: Türk Telekom Stadı; Attendance: 37,308; Referee: Ali Palabıyık

28 October 2018 Match 10	Yeni Malatyaspor	2–0	Galatasaray	Malatya
18:00 TRT	Donald 35'; Büyük 66' (pen.)	Report		Stadium: New Malatya Stadium; Attendance: 15,348; Referee: Halis Özkahya

2 November 2018 Match 11	Galatasaray	2–2	Fenerbahçe	Istanbul
21:00 TRT	Donk 31'; Linnes 49'	Report	Valbuena 66' (pen.); Jailson 72'	Stadium: Türk Telekom Stadı; Attendance: 49,929; Referee: Fırat Aydınus

10 November 2018 Match 12	Kayserispor	0–3	Galatasaray	Kayseri
19:00 TRT		Report	Onyekuru 18', 74'; Bayram 88'	Stadium: Kadir Has Stadı; Attendance: 14,363; Referee: Ümit Öztürk

23 November 2018 Match 13	Galatasaray	1–1	Konyaspor	Istanbul
20:00 TRT	Demirok 69' (o.g.)	Report	Skubic 90' (pen.)	Stadium: Türk Telekom Stadı; Attendance: 31,290; Referee: Hüseyin Göçek

2 December 2018 Match 14	Beşiktaş	1–0	Galatasaray	Istanbul
20:00 TRT	Ljajić 18' (pen.)	Report		Stadium: Vodafone Park; Attendance: 39,477; Referee: Cüneyt Çakır

8 December 2018 Match 15	Galatasaray	2–2	Rizespor	Istanbul
19:00 TRT	Rodrigues 40'; Derdiyok 58'	Report	Umar 67'; Samudio 80'	Stadium: Türk Telekom Stadı; Attendance: 28,426; Referee: Ali Palabıyık

15 December 2018 Match 16	İstanbul Başakşehir	1–1	Galatasaray	Istanbul
19:00 TRT	Kahveci 18'	Report	Derdiyok 30' (pen.)	Stadium: Fatih Terim Stadium; Attendance: 6,676; Referee: Ümit Öztürk

23 December 2018 Match 17	Galatasaray	4–2	Sivasspor	Istanbul
19:00 TRT	Derdiyok 20' (pen.); Feghouli 30'; Onyekuru 51', 69'	Report	Robinho 9', 41'	Stadium: Türk Telekom Stadı; Attendance: 33,294; Referee: Halil Umut Meler

19 January 2019 Match 18	Galatasaray	6–0	Ankaragücü	Istanbul
19:00 TRT	Gümüş 1', 26'; Onyekuru 21', 59', 63'; Ndiaye 86'	Report		Stadium: Türk Telekom Stadı; Attendance: 28,561; Referee: Alper Ulusoy

26 January 2019 Match 19	Göztepe	0–1	Galatasaray	İzmir
19:00 TRT		Report	Gümüş 72'	Stadium: Bornova Stadium; Attendance: 8,577; Referee: Bülent Yıldırım

2 February 2019 Match 20	Alanyaspor	1–1	Galatasaray	Alanya
19:00 TRT	Djalma 45'	Report	Feghouli 52'	Stadium: Bahçeşehir Okulları Stadium; Attendance: 8,082; Referee: Alper Ulusoy

10 February 2019 Match 21	Galatasaray	3–1	Trabzonspor	Istanbul
19:00 TRT	Diagne 21' (pen.); Belhanda 44', 51'	Report	Rodallega 30'	Stadium: Türk Telekom Stadı; Attendance: 46,927; Referee: Ümit Öztürk

17 February 2019 Match 22	Kasımpaşa	1–4	Galatasaray	Istanbul
19:00 TRT	Trézéguet 14'	Report	Belhanda 22'; Feghouli 28', 53', 68'	Stadium: Recep Tayyip Erdoğan Stadium; Attendance: 5,569; Referee: Ali Palabıyık

24 February 2019 Match 23	Galatasaray	1–0	Akhisarspor	Istanbul
19:00 TRT	Mitroglou 90+4'	Report		Stadium: Türk Telekom Stadı; Attendance: 24,836; Referee: Suat Arslanboğa

3 March 2019 Match 24	BB Erzurumspor	1–1	Galatasaray	Erzurum
19:00 TRT	Muhammed 18'	Report	Belhanda 52'	Stadium: Kazım Karabekir Stadı; Attendance: 23,700; Referee: Cüneyt Çakır

11 March 2019 Match 25	Galatasaray	5–0	Antalyaspor	Istanbul
20:00 TRT	Feghouli 17'; Onyekuru 65', 78'; Ndiaye 68'; Diagne 90+4'	Report		Stadium: Türk Telekom Stadı; Attendance: 33,335; Referee: Arda Kardeşler

17 March 2019 Match 26	Bursaspor	2–3	Galatasaray	Bursa
19:00 TRT	Sakho 15'; Saivet 42'	Report	Ndiaye 45+2'; Diagne 56' (pen.); Feghouli 62'	Stadium: Bursa Büyükşehir Belediye Stadium; Attendance: 30,625; Referee: Suat Arslanboğa

6 April 2019 Match 27	Galatasaray	3–0	Yeni Malatyaspor	Istanbul
19:00 TRT	Diagne 45+4' (pen.), 50', 89' (pen.)	Report		Stadium: Türk Telekom Stadı; Attendance: 33,654; Referee: Yaşar Kemal Uğurlu

14 April 2019 Match 28	Fenerbahçe	1–1	Galatasaray	Istanbul
19:00 TRT	Elmas 71'	Report	Onyekuru 66'	Stadium: Şükrü Saracoğlu Stadium; Attendance: 44,612; Referee: Ali Palabıyık

20 April 2019 Match 29	Galatasaray	3–1	Kayserispor	Istanbul
19:00 TRT	Diagne 16', 42' (pen.); Nagatomo 45+4'	Report	Kravets 15'	Stadium: Türk Telekom Stadı; Attendance: 33,344; Referee: Arda Kardeşler

29 April 2019 Match 30	Konyaspor	0–0	Galatasaray	Konya
20:00 TRT		Report		Stadium: Konya Büyükşehir Stadium; Attendance: 23,850; Referee: Mete Kalkavan

5 May 2019 Match 31	Galatasaray	2–0	Beşiktaş	Istanbul
19:00 TRT	Onyekuru 44'; Fernando 54'	Report		Stadium: Türk Telekom Stadı; Attendance: 51,578; Referee: Bülent Yıldırım

11 May 2019 Match 32	Rizespor	2–3	Galatasaray	Rize
16:00 TRT	Muriqi 45'; Umar 76'	Report	Feghouli 9'; Diagne 90+2' (pen.), 90+7'	Stadium: Yeni Rize Şehir Stadium; Attendance: 11,150; Referee: Serkan Çınar

19 May 2019 Match 33	Galatasaray	2–1	İstanbul Başakşehir	Istanbul
19:00 TRT	Feghouli 47'; Onyekuru 64'	Report	Bajić 17'	Stadium: Türk Telekom Stadı; Attendance: 50,057; Referee: Cüneyt Çakır

24 May 2019 Match 34	Sivasspor	4–3	Galatasaray	Sivas
21:00 TRT	Rybalka 43', 77'; Arslan 45+1'; Koné 79'	Report	Linnes 2'; Çelik 34', 82'	Stadium: New Sivas 4 Eylül Stadium; Referee: Zorbay Küçük

=== Turkish Super Cup ===
5 August 2018	Galatasaray	1–1 (a.e.t.) (4–5 p)	Akhisarspor	Konya
20:45 TRT	Derdiyok 79'; Rodrigues (yellow card) 78'; Aziz (yellow card) 116'	Report	Seleznyov 5'; Yumlu (yellow card) 15'; Nounkeu (yellow card) 43'; Manu (yellow card) 45'	Stadium: Konya Büyükşehir Stadium; Attendance: 27,000; Referee: Cüneyt Çakır
	Penalties
	İnan (penalty scored); Derdiyok (penalty scored); Feghouli (penalty scored); Rodrigues (penalty scored); Gomis (penalty missed)		Vural (penalty scored); Larsson (penalty scored); Bayram (penalty scored); Lopes (penalty scored); Seleznyov (penalty scored)

=== Turkish Cup ===
==== Fifth round ====
5 December 2018	Keçiörengücü	1–2	Galatasaray	Ankara
13:00 TRT	Şakar 51'	Report	Babacan 33'; Linnes 50'	Stadium: Aktepe Stadi; Attendance: 4,883; Referee: Suat Arslanboğa

18 December 2018	Galatasaray	1–1 (3–2 agg.)	Keçiörengücü	Istanbul
20:30 TRT	Akgün 65'	Report	Balcı 85'	Stadium: Türk Telekom Stadı; Attendance: 4,844; Referee: Özgür Yankaya

==== Round of 16 ====
22 January 2019	Boluspor	0–1	Galatasaray	Bolu
19:45 TRT		Report	İnan 42' (pen.)	Stadium: Atatürk Stadium; Referee: Suat Arslanboğa

29 January 2019	Galatasaray	4–1 (5–1 agg.)	Boluspor	Istanbul
19:45 TRT	Akgün 19', 69', 78' (pen.); Çelik 33'	Report	Akabueze 80' (pen.)	Stadium: Türk Telekom Stadı; Attendance: 11,951; Referee: Serkan Tokat

==== Quarter-finals ====
6 February 2019	Galatasaray	2–0	Hatayspor	Istanbul
20:30 TRT	Luyindama 7'; Feghouli 90+2'	Report		Stadium: Türk Telekom Stadı; Attendance: 13,562; Referee: Mustafa Öğretmenoğlu

27 February 2019	Hatayspor	4–2 (4–4 agg.)	Galatasaray	Hatay
14:00 TRT	Karadeniz 59' (pen.), 71' (pen.); Aydın 79'; Çipe 87' (o.g.)	Report	Çelik 21'; Akbaba 53'	Stadium: Antakya Atatürk Stadium; Attendance: 4,939; Referee: Yaşar Kemal Uğurlu

Galatasaray won on away goals.

==== Semi-finals ====
2 April 2019	Galatasaray	0–0	Yeni Malatyaspor	Istanbul
20:00 TRT		Report		Stadium: Türk Telekom Stadı; Attendance: 16,695; Referee: Halil Umut Meler

25 April 2019	Yeni Malatyaspor	2–5 (2–5 agg.)	Galatasaray	Malatya
20:00 TRT	Aleksić 45+14' (pen.); Mina 89'	Report	Linnes 5'; Feghouli 39'; Onyekuru 58', 74'; Mitroglou 83'	Stadium: New Malatya Stadium; Attendance: n/a Referee: Alper Ulusoy

==== Final ====
15 May 2019	Akhisarspor	1–3	Galatasaray	Sivas
20:45 TRT	Manu 57'	Report	Gümüş 80' (pen.); Feghouli 88'; Diagne 94+4'	Stadium: Sivas 4 Eylül Stadium; Attendance: 25,000; Referee: Suat Arslanboğa

=== UEFA Champions League ===
==== Group stage ====
Pos	Team	Pld	W	D	L	GF	GA	GD	Pts	Qualification
1	(Portugal) Porto	6	5	1	0	15	6	+9	16	Advance to knockout phase
2	(Germany) Schalke 04	6	3	2	1	6	4	+2	11	Advance to knockout phase
3	(Turkey) Galatasaray	6	1	1	4	5	8	−3	4	Transfer to Europa League
4	(Russia) Lokomotiv Moscow	6	1	0	5	4	12	−8	3	

Source: UEFA
Rules for classification: Group stage tiebreakers

18 September 2018 1	Galatasaray (Turkey)	3–0	(Russia) Lokomotiv Moscow	Türk Telekom Stadium, Istanbul
22:00 TRT	Rodrigues 9'; Derdiyok 67'; İnan 90+4' (pen.)	Report		Attendance: 43,542; Referee: Gianluca Rocchi (Italy)

3 October 2018 2	Porto (Portugal)	1–0	(Turkey) Galatasaray	Estádio do Dragão, Porto
21:00 (20:00 WEST)	Marega 49'	Report		Attendance: 42,711; Referee: Michael Oliver (England)

24 October 2018 3	Galatasaray (Turkey)	0–0	(Germany) Schalke 04	Türk Telekom Stadium, Istanbul
22:00 TRT		Report		Attendance: 46,667; Referee: Benoît Bastien (France)

6 November 2018 4	Schalke 04 (Germany)	2–0	(Turkey) Galatasaray	Arena AufSchalke, Gelsenkirchen
21:00	Burgstaller 4'; Uth 57'	Report		Attendance: 54,740; Referee: Willie Collum (Scotland)

28 November 2018 5	Lokomotiv Moscow (Russia)	2–0	(Turkey) Galatasaray	RZD Arena, Moscow
18:55 (20:55 MSK)	Donk 43' (o.g.); Ignatyev 54'	Report		Attendance: 14,037; Referee: Antonio Mateu Lahoz (Spain)

11 December 2018 6	Galatasaray (Turkey)	2–3	(Portugal) Porto	Türk Telekom Stadium, Istanbul
20:55 TRT	Feghouli 45+1' (pen.); Derdiyok 65'	Report	Felipe 17'; Marega 42' (pen.); Oliveira 57'	Attendance: 33,972; Referee: Aleksei Kulbakov (Belarus)

=== UEFA Europa League ===
==== Round of 32 ====
14 February 2019 1	Galatasaray (Turkey)	1–2	(Portugal) Benfica	Istanbul
20:55 (18:55 WET)	Luyindama 54'	Report	Salvio 27' (pen.); Seferovic 64'	Stadium: Türk Telekom Stadı; Attendance: 42,722; Referee: Jesús Gil Manzano (Spain)

21 February 2019 2	Benfica (Portugal)	0–0 (2–1 agg.)	(Turkey) Galatasaray	Lisbon
21:00 (20:00 WET)		Report		Stadium: Estádio da Luz; Attendance: 49,545; Referee: Ovidiu Hațegan (Romania)

== Statistics ==
=== Squad statistics ===
No.	Pos.	Nat.	Player	Süper Lig				Turkish Cup				Super Cup				Champions League				Europa League				Total			
No.	Pos.	Nat.	Player	Apps	Goal	Yellow card	Red card	Apps	Goal	Yellow card	Red card	Apps	Goal	Yellow card	Red card	Apps	Goal	Yellow card	Red card	Apps	Goal	Yellow card	Red card	Apps	Goal	Yellow card	Red card
1	GK	(Uruguay)	Fernando Muslera	33	0	1	0	3	0	1	0	1	0	0	0	6	0	0	0	2	0	0	0	45	0	2	0
2	DF	(Brazil)	Mariano	30	0	10	0	4	0	0	0	0	0	0	0	3	0	0	0	2	0	0	0	39	0	10	0
5	DF	(Turkey)	Ahmet Çalık	6	0	0	0	6	0	0	0	0	0	0	0	0	0	0	0	0	0	0	0	12	0	0	0
8	MF	(Turkey)	Selçuk İnan	21	0	3	0	7	1	0	0	1	0	0	0	5	1	0	0	0	0	0	0	34	2	3	0
9	FW	(Switzerland)	Eren Derdiyok	13	7	1	0	0	0	0	0	1	1	0	0	4	2	0	0	0	0	0	0	18	10	1	0
10	MF	(Morocco)	Younès Belhanda	24	4	8	1	4	0	2	0	1	0	0	0	4	0	1	0	2	0	0	0	35	4	11	1
11	FW	(Turkey)	Sinan Gümüş	18	4	5	0	6	1	0	0	0	0	0	0	3	0	0	0	2	0	0	0	29	5	5	0
12	GK	(Turkey)	Batuhan Şen	0	0	0	0	1	0	0	0	0	0	0	0	0	0	0	0	0	0	0	0	1	0	0	0
13	GK	(Turkey)	İsmail Çipe	1	0	1	0	6	0	0	0	0	0	0	0	0	0	0	0	0	0	0	0	7	0	1	0
14	DF	(Norway)	Martin Linnes	18	1	3	0	7	2	0	0	1	0	0	0	5	0	2	0	1	0	0	0	32	3	5	0
15	MF	(Netherlands)	Ryan Donk	21	2	3	0	7	0	2	0	1	0	0	0	6	0	2	0	1	0	0	0	36	2	7	0
17	MF	(Senegal)	Badou Ndiaye	22	3	5	1	3	0	1	0	0	0	0	0	5	0	0	1	2	0	2	0	32	3	8	2
19	DF	(Turkey)	Ömer Bayram	11	1	1	0	6	0	1	0	0	0	0	0	2	0	0	0	0	0	0	0	19	1	2	0
20	MF	(Turkey)	Emre Akbaba	16	2	2	0	3	1	1	0	0	0	0	0	1	0	0	0	1	0	0	0	21	3	3	0
21	FW	(Nigeria)	Henry Onyekuru	30	14	6	0	6	2	1	0	0	0	0	0	5	0	0	0	2	0	0	0	43	16	7	0
22	FW	(Greece)	Kostas Mitroglou	7	1	0	0	2	1	0	0	0	0	0	0	0	0	0	0	0	0	0	0	9	2	0	0
25	MF	(Brazil)	Fernando	22	2	9	0	4	0	0	0	1	0	0	0	4	0	2	0	1	0	1	0	32	2	12	0
26	DF	(Turkey)	Semih Kaya	4	0	0	0	2	0	1	0	0	0	0	0	0	0	0	0	0	0	0	0	6	0	1	0
27	MF	(Democratic Republic of the Congo)	Christian Luyindama	11	0	4	0	4	1	1	0	0	0	0	0	0	0	0	0	2	1	0	0	17	2	5	0
33	DF	(Turkey)	Emre Taşdemir	6	0	3	0	3	0	0	0	0	0	0	0	0	0	0	0	0	0	0	0	9	0	3	0
35	MF	(Turkey)	Yunus Akgün	10	0	0	0	6	4	0	0	1	0	0	0	1	0	0	0	1	0	0	0	19	4	0	0
36	MF	(Turkey)	Atalay Babacan	0	0	0	0	2	1	0	0	0	0	0	0	0	0	0	0	0	0	0	0	2	1	0	0
37	FW	(Turkey)	Recep Gül	0	0	0	0	1	0	0	0	0	0	0	0	0	0	0	0	0	0	0	0	1	0	0	0
38	FW	(Turkey)	Malik Karaahmet	0	0	0	0	1	0	0	0	0	0	0	0	0	0	0	0	0	0	0	0	1	0	0	0
40	MF	(Turkey)	Gökay Güney	1	0	0	0	4	0	0	0	0	0	0	0	0	0	0	0	0	0	0	0	5	0	0	0
41	MF	(Turkey)	Mustafa Kapı	1	0	0	0	0	0	0	0	0	0	0	0	0	0	0	0	0	0	0	0	1	0	0	0
45	DF	(Brazil)	Marcão	14	0	5	0	4	0	0	0	0	0	0	0	0	0	0	0	2	0	1	0	20	0	6	0
47	MF	(Turkey)	Abdussamed Karnucu	0	0	0	0	1	0	0	0	0	0	0	0	0	0	0	0	0	0	0	0	1	0	0	0
49	FW	(Turkey)	Ali Yavuz Kol	0	0	0	0	2	0	0	0	0	0	0	0	0	0	0	0	0	0	0	0	2	0	0	0
52	MF	(Turkey)	Celil Yüksel	2	0	0	0	4	0	0	0	0	0	0	0	0	0	0	0	0	0	0	0	6	0	0	0
55	DF	(Japan)	Yuto Nagatomo	17	1	2	0	0	0	0	0	1	0	0	0	5	0	1	0	2	0	1	0	25	1	4	0
88	FW	(Turkey)	Muğdat Çelik	9	0	0	0	5	2	2	0	0	0	0	0	3	0	1	0	0	0	0	0	17	2	3	0
89	MF	(Algeria)	Sofiane Feghouli	29	9	2	0	5	3	2	0	1	0	0	0	3	1	0	0	2	0	0	0	40	13	4	0
91	FW	(Senegal)	Mbaye Diagne	12	10	2	0	3	1	0	0	0	0	0	0	0	0	0	0	2	0	0	0	17	11	2	0
Players transferred out during the season
3	DF	(Brazil)	Maicon	15	1	0	0	2	0	0	0	1	0	0	0	4	0	1	0	0	0	0	0	22	1	1	0
4	DF	(Turkey)	Serdar Aziz	10	2	2	1	0	0	0	0	1	0	1	0	4	0	3	0	0	0	0	0	15	2	6	1
7	MF	(Cape Verde)	Garry Rodrigues	12	3	2	0	1	0	0	0	1	0	1	0	6	1	0	0	0	0	0	0	20	4	3	0
18	FW	(France)	Bafétimbi Gomis	1	0	0	0	0	0	0	0	1	0	0	0	0	0	0	0	0	0	0	0	2	0	0	0
23	DF	(France)	Lionel Carole	0	0	0	0	0	0	0	0	1	0	0	0	0	0	0	0	0	0	0	0	1	0	0	0
43	DF	(Turkey)	Ozan Kabak	13	0	3	0	0	0	0	0	0	0	0	0	4	0	0	0	0	0	0	0	17	0	3	0

Last updated: 19 May 2019.

=== Clean sheets ===
Rank	Player	Süper Lig	Turkish Cup	Super Cup	Champions League	Europa League	Total
1	(Uruguay) Fernando Muslera	12	1	0	2	1	16
2	(Turkey) İsmail Çipe	1	2	0	0	0	3
Total		13	3	0	2	1	19

Last updated: 5 May 2019.

=== Attendances ===
Competition	Total. Att.	Avg. Att.
Süper Lig	619,465	36,439
Turkish Cup	47,052	11,763
Europe	167,832	41,958
Total	834,349	33,374

- Sold season tickets: 35,600

== See also ==
- 2018–19 Süper Lig
- 2018–19 Turkish Cup
- 2018–19 UEFA Champions League
- 2018–19 UEFA Europa League
