= 2018–19 Turkish Cup =

Ziraat Turkish Cup

Tournament details
- Country: Turkey
- Teams: 166

Final positions
- Champions: Galatasaray
- Runners-up: Akhisarspor
- Semifinalists: Ümraniyespor; Yeni Malatyaspor

The 2018–19 Turkish Cup (Turkish: Türkiye Kupası) was the 57th season of the tournament. Ziraat Bankası was the sponsor of the tournament, thus the sponsored name was Ziraat Turkish Cup. The winners will earn a berth in the group stage of the 2019–20 UEFA Europa League, and also qualify for the 2019 Turkish Super Cup.

== Competition format ==
round	Total clubs remaining	Clubs involved	Winners from previous round	New entries this round	Leagues entering at this round	Notes
First round	166	42	0	42	Regional Amateur League (42 teams)	single leg; no seeds
Second round	145	74	21	53	Third League (53 teams)	single leg; no seeds
Third round	108	96	37	59	Second League (36 teams), First League (18 teams), Super League (5 teams not entering in fourth and fifth rounds)	single leg; seeding applied
Fourth round	60	56	48	8	Super League (8 teams ranked 5th to 13th in 2017–18 season except 2017–18 Turkish Cup winner)	single leg; seeding applied
Fifth round	32	32	28	4	Super League (3 teams ranked 1st to 3rd in 2017–18 season plus 2017–18 Turkish Cup winner)	two legs; seeding applied
Round of 16	16	16	16	0		two legs; seeding applied
Quarter-finals	8	8	8	0		two legs; seeding applied
Semi-finals	4	4	4	0		two legs; no seeds
Final	2	2	2	0		single leg; no seeds

== First round ==
- 42 Regional Amateur League teams competed in this round. No seeds were applied in the single-leg round.

Seeded	League	Rank	Unseeded	League	Rank
Altınova Belediyespor	AL	134	Diyarbakır Yolspor	AL	160
Ödemiş Spor	AL	135	Kırıkkale Büyük Anadoluspor	AL	163
Ağrı 1970 SK	AL	136	Siirt İl Özel İdare	AL	172
68 Aksaray Belediyespor	AL	137	Karaman Belediyespor	AL	175
Maltepespor	AL	138	Bozüyük Vitraspor	AL	180
Karadeniz Ereğli Belediye	AL	139	Edirnespor	AL	182
Isparta Davrazspor	AL	140	Bigaspor	AL	194
Kütahyaspor	AL	141	Yüksekova Belediyespor	AL	216
Ünye 1957	AL	144	Kilis Belediyespor	AL	220
Çerkezköy 1911	AL	146	Bucak Bld.Oğuzhan	AL	235
Belediye Derincespor	AL	148	Sinopspor	AL	239
Yozgatspor 1959 FK	AL	149	1074 Çankırıspor	AL	243
Bartınspor	AL	150	Karlıova Yıldırımspor	AL	255
Beylerbeyi	AL	151	Yeniçağaspor	AL	256
Yeni Amasyaspor	AL	153	1955 Batman Belediyespor	AL	NR
Mut İdmanyurdu Belediye	AL	154	Bitlis Özgüzeldere	AL	NR
Serhat Ardahan	AL	155	Dersim 62 Spor	AL	NR
Çengelköyspor A.Ş.	AL	156	Iğdır Es Spor	AL	NR
Çayırovaspor	AL	157	Mardin BŞBld.	AL	NR
Denizli Kale Belediye	AL	158	Muş Menderesspor	AL	NR
Gaziosmanpaşa	AL	159	Sarıkamış Gençlerbirliği	AL	NR

AL: Regional Amateur League. Ranks are determined by the guidelines in 2018–19 Turkish Cup Regulations.

- 10 seeded (48%) and 11 unseeded (52%) teams qualified for the next round.

Team 1	Score	Team 2
28 August 2018
Karaman Belediyespor	1–0	Yozgatspor 1959 FK
Karadeniz Ereğli Belediye	3–2	1074 Çankırıspor
29 August 2018
Sinopspor	0–0 (4–2 p)	Ünye 1957
Yeni Amasyaspor	3–1	Kırıkkale Büyük Anadoluspor
Kilis Belediyespor	3–2 (a.e.t.)	Diyarbakır Yolspor
Bitlis Özgüzeldere	2–1	Mardin BŞBld.
Iğdır Es Spor	1–0	Ağrı 1970 SK
Serhat Ardahan	0–3	Sarıkamış Gençlerbirliği
Yüksekova Belediyespor	2–0	Muş Menderesspor
1955 Batmanspor	1–1 (3–4 p)	Siirt İl Özel İdare
62 Pertekspor	4–1	Karlıova Yıldırımspor
68 Aksaray Belediyespor	2–1	Mut İdmanyurdu Belediye
Altınova Belediyespor	3–4 (a.e.t.)	Çayırovaspor
Bozüyük Vitraspor	3–2	Belediye Derincespor
Bucak Bld.Oğuzhan	2–1	Bigaspor
Çengelköyspor A.Ş.	2–0	Çerkezköy 1911
Gaziosmanpaşa	1–0	Edirnespor
Kütahyaspor	3–2 (a.e.t.)	Ödemiş Spor
Maltepespor	1–0 (a.e.t.)	Beylerbeyi
Yeniçağaspor	0–2	Bartınspor
Isparta Davrazspor	0–1	Denizli Kale Belediye

== Second round ==
- 53 Third League and 21 Regional Amateur League teams competed in this round. No seeds were applied in the single-leg round.

Seeded	League	Rank	Unseeded	League	Rank
Bucaspor	3L	72	Yomraspor	3L	109
Nazilli Belediyespor	3L	73	1461 Trabzon	3L	110
Karşıyaka	3L	74	Ankara Adliyespor	3L	111
Körfez Spor Kulübü	3L	75	Erzin Belediyespor	3L	112
Silivrispor	3L	76	Osmaniyespor FK	3L	113
Bayburt İl Özel İdare Gençlik Spor	3L	77	Ergene Velimeşe	3L	114
Diyarbekirspor	3L	78	Bergama Belediyespor	3L	115
Sultanbeyli Belediyespor	3L	79	Fatsa Belediyespor	3L	116
Kemerspor 2003	3L	80	Nevşehir Belediyespor	3L	117
Tire 1922	3L	81	Serik Belediyespor	3L	118
Kızılcabölükspor	3L	82	Adıyaman 1954 SK	3L	119
24 Erzincanspor	3L	83	Gebzespor	3L	120
Düzcespor	3L	84	Kırşehir Belediyespor	3L	121
Elaziz Belediyespor	3L	85	Artvin Hopaspor	3L	122
Pazarspor	3L	86	Alibeyköyspor	3L	123
Ofspor	3L	87	Şile Yıldızspor	3L	124
Büyükçekmece Tepecikspor	3L	88	68 Aksaray Belediyespor	AL	137
Yeni Orduspor	3L	89	Maltepespor	AL	138
Halide Edip Adıvar SK	3L	90	Karadeniz Ereğli Belediye	AL	139
Çorum Belediyespor	3L	91	Kütahyaspor	AL	141
Bağcılar SK	3L	92	Bartınspor	AL	150
Erbaaspor	3L	93	Yeni Amasyaspor	AL	153
Cizrespor	3L	94	Çengelköyspor A.Ş.	AL	156
Van BBSK	3L	95	Çayırovaspor	AL	157
Batman Petrolspor	3L	96	Denizli Kale Belediye	AL	158
Hekimoğlu Trabzon	3L	97	Gaziosmanpaşa	AL	159
Turgutluspor	3L	98	Siirt İl Özel İdare	AL	172
Karaköprü Belediyespor	3L	99	Karaman Belediyespor	AL	175
Altındağ Belediyespor	3L	100	Bozüyük Vitraspor	AL	180
Gölcükspor	3L	101	Yüksekova Belediyespor	AL	216
Karacabey Belediyespor	3L	102	Kilis Belediyespor	AL	220
Çatalcaspor	3L	103	Bucak Bld.Oğuzhan	AL	235
Esenler Erokspor	3L	104	Sinopspor	AL	239
Payasspor	3L	105	Bitlis Özgüzeldere	AL	NR
Kozan Belediyespor	3L	106	Dersim 62 Spor	AL	NR
Muğlaspor	3L	107	Iğdır Es Spor	AL	NR
Kocaelispor	3L	108	Sarıkamış Gençlerbirliği	AL	NR

3L: Third League, AL: Regional Amateur League. Ranks are determined by the guidelines in 2018–19 Turkish Cup Regulations.

- 24 teams (45%) from Third League and 13 teams (62%) from the Regional Amateur League qualified for the next round.
- 17 seeded (46%) and 20 unseeded (54%) teams qualified for the next round.
- Biggest upset was Dersim 62 Spor (no ranking) eliminating Karaköprü Belediyespor (ranked 99th).
- Lowest-ranked teams qualifying for the next round were Dersim 62 Spor and Bitlis Özgüzeldere (both with no ranking).
- Highest-ranked team eliminated was Bucaspor (ranked 72nd).

Team 1	Score	Team 2
11 September 2018
Ofspor	1–1 (2–4 p)	1461 Trabzon
Karaköprü Belediyespor	2–3	Dersim 62 Spor
Pazarspor	2–0	Bayburt İl Özel İdare Gençlik Spor
Ankara Adliyespor	0–0 (3–4 p)	Bozüyük Vitraspor
Bucak Bld.Oğuzhan	3–1	Kızılcabölükspor
Iğdır Es Spor	0–1	Bitlis Özgüzeldere
Payasspor	0–0 (4–1 p)	Kozan Belediyespor
12 September 2018
Artvin Hopaspor	0–0 (3–4 p)	24 Erzincanspor
Batman Petrolspor	1–0	Yüksekova Belediyespor
Diyarbekirspor	2–0	Elaziz Belediyespor
Hekimoğlu Trabzon	0–2	Yomraspor
Siirt İl Özel İdare	3–0	Cizrespor
Van BBSK	2–0 (a.e.t.)	Sarıkamış Gençlerbirliği
Altındağ Belediyespor	1–0	Kütahyaspor
Erbaaspor	1–1 (3–2 p)	Fatsa Belediyespor
Erzin Belediyespor	3–0	Adıyaman 1954 SK
Karadeniz Ereğli Belediye	2–1	Gebzespor
Karaman Belediyespor	2–1	68 Aksaray Belediyespor
Kemerspor 2003	2–2 (5–4 p)	Muğlaspor
Kırşehir Belediyespor	3–2	Nevşehir Belediyespor
Kilis Belediyespor	2–1 (a.e.t.)	Osmaniyespor FK
Serik Belediyespor	4–1	Denizli Kale Belediye
Bergama Belediyespor	2–1	Bucaspor
Büyükçekmece Tepecikspor	1–3	Gaziosmanpaşa
Esenler Erokspor	2–1	Ergene Velimeşe
Halide Edip Adıvar SK	0–1	Çengelköyspor A.Ş.
Körfez Spor Kulübü	2–1	Düzcespor
Maltepespor	1–1 (4–2 p)	Sultanbeyli Belediyespor
Silivrispor	1–0	Alibeyköyspor
Sinopspor	2–2 (4–5 p)	Yeni Orduspor
Şile Yıldızspor	3–2	Karacabey Belediyespor
Kocaelispor	2–0 (a.e.t.)	Gölcükspor
Tire 1922	2–1 (a.e.t.)	Turgutluspor
13 September 2018
Yeni Amasyaspor	1–0	Çorum Belediyespor
Bartınspor	2–1	Çayırovaspor
Bağcılar SK	2–1	Çatalcaspor
Nazilli Belediyespor	2–0	Karşıyaka

== Third round ==
- 5 Super League, 18 First League, 36 Second League, 24 Third League and 13 Regional Amateur League teams competed in this round. Seeds were applied in the single-leg round.

Seeded	League	Rank	Unseeded	League	Rank
Antalyaspor	SL	13	Pendikspor	2L	61
Atiker Konyaspor	SL	14	BB Bodrumspor	2L	62
Çaykur Rizespor	SL	15	Fethiyespor	2L	63
MKE Ankaragücü	SL	16	Amed Sportif	2L	64
BB Erzurumspor	SL	17	Fatih Karagümrük	2L	65
Osmanlıspor FK	1L	18	Manisa BBSK	2L	66
Gençlerbirliği	1L	19	Darıca Gençlerbirliği	2L	67
Kardemir Karabükspor	1L	20	Utaş Uşakspor	2L	68
Boluspor	1L	21	Ankara Demirspor	2L	69
Ümraniyespor	1L	22	Tarsus İdman Yurdu	2L	70
Gazişehir Gaziantep FK	1L	23	Bayrampaşa	2L	71
Altınordu	1L	24	Nazilli Belediyespor	3L	73
Balıkesirspor Baltok	1L	25	Körfez Spor Kulübü	3L	75
Istanbulspor	1L	26	Silivrispor	3L	76
Elazığspor	1L	27	Diyarbekirspor	3L	78
Giresunspor	1L	28	Kemerspor 2003	3L	80
Adanaspor	1L	29	Tire 1922	3L	81
Eskişehirspor	1L	30	24 Erzincanspor	3L	83
Adana Demirspor	1L	31	Pazarspor	3L	86
Denizlispor	1L	32	Yeni Orduspor	3L	89
Hatayspor	1L	33	Bağcılar SK	3L	92
Altay	1L	34	Erbaaspor	3L	93
Afjet Afyonspor	1L	35	Van BBSK	3L	95
Samsunspor	2L	36	Batman Petrolspor	3L	96
Manisaspor	2L	37	Altındağ Belediyespor	3L	100
Gaziantepspor	2L	38	Esenler Erokspor	3L	104
Menemen Belediyespor	2L	39	Payasspor	3L	105
Bandırmaspor	2L	40	Kocaelispor	3L	108
Gümüşhanespor	2L	41	Yomraspor	3L	109
Sivas Belediyespor	2L	42	1461 Trabzon	3L	110
Şanlıurfaspor	2L	43	Erzin Belediyespor	3L	112
Keçiörengücü	2L	44	Bergama Belediyespor	3L	115
Sakaryaspor	2L	45	Serik Belediyespor	3L	118
Sancaktepe Belediyespor	2L	46	Kırşehir Belediyespor	3L	121
Bugsaş Spor	2L	47	Şile Yıldızspor	3L	124
İnegölspor	2L	48	Maltepespor	AL	138
Hacettepe Spor	2L	49	Karadeniz Ereğli Belediye	AL	139
Konya Anadolu Selçukspor	2L	50	Bartınspor	AL	150
Sarıyer	2L	51	Yeni Amasyaspor	AL	153
Niğde Anadolu FK	2L	52	Çengelköyspor A.Ş.	AL	156
Tokatspor	2L	53	Gaziosmanpaşa	AL	159
Etimesgut Belediyespor	2L	54	Siirt İl Özel İdare	AL	172
Kırklarelispor	2L	55	Karaman Belediyespor	AL	175
Kastamonuspor 1966	2L	56	Bozüyük Vitraspor	AL	180
Kahramanmaraşspor	2L	57	Kilis Belediyespor	AL	220
Eyüpspor	2L	58	Bucak Bld.Oğuzhan	AL	235
Zonguldak Kömürspor	2L	59	Bitlis Özgüzeldere	AL	NR
Tuzlaspor	2L	60	Dersim 62 Spor	AL	NR

SL: Super League, 1L: First League, 2L: Second League, 3L: Third League, AL: Regional Amateur League. Ranks are determined by the guidelines in 2018–19 Turkish Cup Regulations.

- 5 teams (100%) from Super League, 13 teams (72%) from First League, 17 teams (47%) from Second League, 11 teams (46%) from Third League and 2 teams (15%) from the Regional Amateur League qualified for the next round.
- 30 seeded (63%) and 18 unseeded (38%) teams qualified for the next round.
- Biggest upset was Dersim 62 Spor (no ranking) eliminating Gaziantepspor (ranked 38th).
- Lowest-ranked team qualifying for the next round was Dersim 62 Spor (no ranking).
- Highest-ranked team eliminated was Gazişehir Gaziantep FK (ranked 23nd).

Team 1	Score	Team 2
25 September 2018
1461 Trabzon	2–2 (5–4 p)	Tuzlaspor
24 Erzincanspor	2–1	Gazişehir Gaziantep FK
Erzin Belediyespor	1–4	Ümraniyespor
Altındağ Belediyespor	3–0	Manisaspor
Diyarbekirspor	1–0	Samsunspor
Bozüyük Vitraspor	0–1	Denizlispor
Kırklarelispor	4–1	Utaş Uşakspor
Maltepespor	1–2	Menemen Belediyespor
Manisa BBSK	1–2	Keçiörengücü
Nazilli Belediyespor	5–0	Tokatspor
Pendikspor	2–1	Altınordu
Tire 1922	0–1	Sivas Belediyespor
BB Erzurumspor	1–0	Ankara Demirspor
Adana Demirspor	2–1	Yeni Orduspor
26 September 2018
Yeni Amasyaspor	2–5	Atiker Konyaspor
Erbaaspor	1–0	Eskişehirspor
Gaziantepspor	0–1 (a.e.t.)	Dersim 62 Spor
Gümüşhanespor	1–0	Silivrispor
Hatayspor	2–1	Esenler Erokspor
Kilis Belediyespor	1–4	Osmanlıspor FK
Van BBSK	4–2 (a.e.t.)	Hacettepe Spor
Bartınspor	1–2	Sarıyer
Karaman Belediyespor	1–3	Etimesgut Belediyespor
Kardemir Karabükspor	3–0	Körfez Spor Kulübü
Kırşehir Belediyespor	2–3	Altay
Konya Anadolu Selçukspor	0–2	Fatih Karagümrük
Zonguldak Kömürspor	4–1	Bayrampaşa
Bandırmaspor	3–0	Gaziosmanpaşa
Bucak Bld.Oğuzhan	2–2 (4–5 p)	Bugsaş Spor
Çengelköyspor A.Ş.	2–1	Sakaryaspor
Darıca Gençlerbirliği	2–1	İnegölspor
Elazığspor	0–4	Batman Petrolspor
Istanbulspor	3–1	Bağcılar SK
Şile Yıldızspor	3–2 (a.e.t.)	Adanaspor
Afjet Afyonspor	2–1	Siirt İl Özel İdare
Fethiyespor	2–0	Sancaktepe Belediyespor
Boluspor	4–1	Payasspor
Kahramanmaraşspor	2–0	Kemerspor 2003
MKE Ankaragücü	2–1	Serik Belediyespor
Şanlıurfaspor	0–1	Yomraspor
Çaykur Rizespor	2–0	Tarsus İdman Yurdu
27 September 2018
Karadeniz Ereğli Belediye	2–3 (a.e.t.)	Antalyaspor
Gençlerbirliği	2–0	Bergama Belediyespor
Niğde Anadolu FK	0–4	Bodrumspor
Eyüpspor	1–3	Pazarspor
Kastamonuspor 1966	3–2	Bitlis Özgüzeldere
Balıkesirspor Baltok	5–0	Amed Sportif
Giresunspor	3–2 (a.e.t.)	Kocaelispor

== Fourth round ==
- 13 Super League, 13 First League, 17 Second League, 11 Third League and 2 Regional Amateur League teams competed in this round. Seeds were applied in the single-leg round.

Seeded	League	Rank	Unseeded	League	Rank
Trabzonspor	SL	4	Gümüşhanespor	2L	41
Göztepe	SL	5	Sivas Belediyespor	2L	42
Sivasspor	SL	6	Keçiörengücü	2L	44
Kasımpaşa	SL	7	Bugsaş Spor	2L	47
Kayserispor	SL	8	Sarıyer	2L	51
Yeni Malatyaspor	SL	9	Etimesgut Belediyespor	2L	54
Alanyaspor	SL	11	Kırklarelispor	2L	55
Bursaspor	SL	12	Kastamonuspor 1966	2L	56
Antalyaspor	SL	13	Kahramanmaraşspor	2L	57
Atiker Konyaspor	SL	14	Zonguldak Kömürspor	2L	59
Çaykur Rizespor	SL	15	Pendikspor	2L	61
MKE Ankaragücü	SL	16	BB Bodrumspor	2L	62
BB Erzurumspor	SL	17	Fethiyespor	2L	63
Osmanlıspor FK	1L	18	Fatih Karagümrük	2L	65
Gençlerbirliği	1L	19	Darıca Gençlerbirliği	2L	67
Kardemir Karabükspor	1L	20	Nazilli Belediyespor	3L	73
Boluspor	1L	21	Diyarbekirspor	3L	78
Ümraniyespor	1L	22	24 Erzincanspor	3L	83
Balıkesirspor Baltok	1L	25	Pazarspor	3L	86
Istanbulspor	1L	26	Erbaaspor	3L	93
Giresunspor	1L	28	Van BBSK	3L	95
Adana Demirspor	1L	31	Batman Petrolspor	3L	96
Denizlispor	1L	32	Altındağ Belediyespor	3L	100
Hatayspor	1L	33	Yomraspor	3L	109
Altay	1L	34	1461 Trabzon	3L	110
Afjet Afyonspor	1L	35	Şile Yıldızspor	3L	124
Menemen Belediyespor	2L	39	Çengelköyspor A.Ş.	AL	156
Bandırmaspor	2L	40	Dersim 62 Spor	AL	NR

SL: Super League, 1L: First League, 2L: Second League, 3L: Third League, AL: Regional Amateur League. Ranks are determined by the guidelines in 2018–19 Turkish Cup Regulations.

- 9 teams (69%) from Super League, 8 teams (62%) from First League, 8 teams (47%) from Second League and 3 teams (27%) from Third League qualified for the next round.
- 18 seeded (64%) and 10 unseeded (36%) teams qualified for the next round.
- Biggest upset was 1461 Trabzon (ranked 110th) eliminating Bursaspor (ranked 12th).
- Lowest-ranked team qualifying for the next round was 1461 Trabzon (ranked 110th).
- Highest-ranked team eliminated was Sivasspor (ranked 6th).

Team 1	Score	Team 2
30 October 2018
Batman Petrolspor	2–3	Kasımpaşa
Sivas Belediyespor	3–2 (a.e.t.)	Denizlispor
Kastamonuspor 1966	2–3 (a.e.t.)	Altay S.K.
Fatih Karagümrük	4–0	Afjet Afyonspor
BB Erzurumspor	2–2 (4–5 p)	Keçiörengücü
Antalyaspor	1–1 (3–0 p)	Yomraspor
Bursaspor	1–2 (a.e.t.)	1461 Trabzon
31 October 2018
Bugsaş Spor	0–2	Trabzonspor
Altındağ Belediyespor	1–3	Alanyaspor
Hatayspor	3–1	Fethiyespor
Bandırmaspor	0–0 (2–4 p)	Van BBSK
Bodrumspor	2–1	Sivasspor
Darıca Gençlerbirliği	6–1	Kardemir Karabükspor
Nazilli Belediyespor	3–2	Osmanlıspor FK
Şile Yıldızspor	2–5	Boluspor
Ümraniyespor	5–1	24 Erzincanspor
MKE Ankaragücü	1–0	Erbaaspor
Kayserispor	6–1	Pazarspor
Yeni Malatyaspor	1–0	Kırklarelispor
Kahramanmaraşspor	3–0	Atiker Konyaspor
1 November 2018
Gümüşhanespor	2–2 (3–5 p)	Giresunspor
Sarıyer	1–2	Çaykur Rizespor
Etimesgut Belediyespor	2–1	Istanbulspor
Adana Demirspor	3–1 (a.e.t.)	Dersim 62 Spor
Menemen Belediyespor	2–0	Zonguldak Kömürspor
Balıkesirspor Baltok	3–1	Pendikspor
Göztepe	4–0	Çengelköyspor A.Ş.
Gençlerbirliği	1–0	Diyarbekirspor

== Fifth round ==
- 13 Super League, 8 First League, 8 Second League and 3 Third League teams competes in this round. Seeds were applied in the two-leg round.

Seeded	League	Rank	Unseeded	League	Rank
Galatasaray	SL	1	Balıkesirspor Baltok	1L	25
Fenerbahçe	SL	2	Giresunspor	1L	28
İstanbul Başakşehir	SL	3	Adana Demirspor	1L	31
Trabzonspor	SL	4	Hatayspor	1L	33
Göztepe	SL	5	Altay	1L	34
Kasımpaşa	SL	7	Menemen Belediyespor	2L	39
Kayserispor	SL	8	Sivas Belediyespor	2L	42
Yeni Malatyaspor	SL	9	Keçiörengücü	2L	44
Akhisarspor	SL	10	Etimesgut Belediyespor	2L	54
Alanyaspor	SL	11	Kahramanmaraşspor	2L	57
Antalyaspor	SL	13	BB Bodrumspor	2L	62
Çaykur Rizespor	SL	15	Fatih Karagümrük	2L	65
MKE Ankaragücü	SL	16	Darıca Gençlerbirliği	2L	67
Gençlerbirliği	1L	19	Nazilli Belediyespor	3L	73
Boluspor	1L	21	Van BBSK	3L	95
Ümraniyespor	1L	22	1461 Trabzon	3L	110

SL: Super League, 1L: First League, 2L: Second League, 3L: Third League. Ranks are determined by the guidelines in 2018–19 Turkish Cup Regulations.

- 11 teams (85%) from Super League, 4 teams (50%) from First League and 1 team (13%) from Second League qualified for the next round.
- 13 seeded (81%) and 3 unseeded (19%) teams qualified for the next round.
- Biggest upset was Bodrumspor (ranked 62nd) eliminating MKE Ankaragücü (ranked 16th).
- Lowest-ranked team qualifying for the next round was Bodrumspor (ranked 62nd).
- Highest-ranked team eliminated was Çaykur Rizespor (ranked 15th).

=== Summary table ===
Team 1	Agg.	Team 2	1st leg	2nd leg
Adana Demirspor	1–3	İstanbul Başakşehir	1–1	0–2
Alanyaspor	8–4	Kahramanmaraşspor	7–2	1–2
Altay	2–6	Kayserispor	1–2	1–4
Antalyaspor	3–2	Darıca Gençlerbirliği	2–2	1–0
Bodrumspor	6–5	MKE Ankaragücü	4–2	2–3
Boluspor	7–3	Van BBSK	5–1	2–2
Çaykur Rizespor	1–3	Balıkesirspor Baltok	0–2	1–1
Fatih Karagümrük	1–6	Akhisarspor	1–4	0–2
Fenerbahçe	6–2	Giresunspor	1–0	5–2
Gençlerbirliği	2–3	Hatayspor	2–1	0–2
Keçiörengücü	2–3	Galatasaray	1–2	1–1
Menemen Belediyespor	2–6	Kasımpaşa	1–2	1–4
Nazilli Belediyespor	1–5	Göztepe	0–3	1–2
Sivas Belediyespor	2–7	Trabzonspor	2–2	0–5
Ümraniyespor	5–4	1461 Trabzon	4–1	1–3
Yeni Malatyaspor	4–0	Etimesgut Belediyespor	2–0	2–0

=== First leg ===
4 December 2018	Sivas Belediyespor	2–2	Trabzonspor	Sivas
13:00	Koçaklı 9'; Yakut 67'		Hosseini 45'; Parmak 46'	Stadium: Muhsin Yazıcıoğlu

4 December 2018	Gençlerbirliği	2–1	Hatayspor	Ankara
14:45	Matei 71'; Akgün 90'		Karadeniz 65'	Stadium: OSTİM

4 December 2018	Nazilli Belediyespor	0–3	Göztepe	Aydın
14:45			Cikalleshi 12'; Karakabak 90' (o.g.); Akbunar 90+3'	Stadium: Nazilli İlçe

4 December 2018	Antalyaspor	2–2	Darıca Gençlerbirliği	Antalya
16:45	Barrada 17' (pen.); Danilo 65'		Taştan 44' (pen.); Karataş 77'	Stadium: Antalya

4 December 2018	Alanyaspor	7–2	Kahramanmaraşspor	Antalya
18:30	Fernandes 34' (pen.); Bobo 51'; Yalçıner 59'; Villafanez 80'; Villafanez 83'; Villafanez 86'; Maniatis 90+3'		İncebacak 45'; Taşcı 58'	Stadium: Bahçeşehir Okulları

4 December 2018	Çaykur Rizespor	0–2	Balıkesirspor Baltok	Rize
20:30			Beleck 12'; Beleck 35'	Stadium: Çaykur Didi

5 December 2018	Keçiörengücü	1–2	Galatasaray	Ankara
13:00	Şakar 51'		Babacan 33'; Linnes 50'	Stadium: Aktepe

5 December 2018	Ümraniyespor	4–1	1461 Trabzon	Istanbul
14:45	Gönülaçar 45'; Açıl 53'; Dialiba 79'; Leandrinho 86'		Öksüz 48'	Stadium: Ümraniye Belediyesi Şehir

5 December 2018	Boluspor	5–1	Van BBSK	Bolu
17:00	Güler 54'; Altıntaş 57'; Altıntaş 75'; Odabaşı 78'; Sebaihi 82'		Saray 81'	Stadium: Bolu Atatürk

5 December 2018	Altay	1–2	Kayserispor	İzmir
18:30	Akın 90'		Başacıkoğlu 59'; Kravets 67'	Stadium: İzmir Atatürk

5 December 2018	Adana Demirspor	1–1	İstanbul Başakşehir	Adana
20:30	Taşdelen 54' (pen.)		Visca 85' (pen.)	Stadium: 5 Ocak Fatih Terim

6 December 2018	Bodrumspor	4–2	MKE Ankaragücü	Muğla
13:00	Aktaş 57'; Kavaklıdere 69'; Şahin 82'; Dumanlı 86'		Akan 54'; Kubalas 64'	Stadium: Muğla Atatürk

6 December 2018	Fatih Karagümrük	1–4	Akhisarspor	Istanbul
15:00	Gökçe 79'		Bokila 23'; Güler 54'; Regattin 64'; Larsson 90'	Stadium: Atatürk Olimpiyat

6 December 2018	Menemen Belediyespor	1–2	Kasımpaşa	İzmir
17:00	Baydemir 86'		Çek 55'; Sarı 60'	Stadium: Menemen İlçe

6 December 2018	Yeni Malatyaspor	2–0	Etimesgut Belediyespor	Malatya
18:30	Boutaib 60'; Tozlu 82'			Stadium: Malatya Arena

6 December 2018	Fenerbahçe	1–0	Giresunspor	Istanbul
20:30	Slimani 80'			Stadium: Şükrü Saracoğlu Stadium

=== Second leg ===
18 December 2018	1461 Trabzon	3–1	Ümraniyespor	Trabzon
13:00	Temir 53'; Tütüncü 61'; Tütüncü 87'		Leandrinho 45' (pen.)	Stadium: Ahmet Suat Özyazıcı

18 December 2018	MKE Ankaragücü	3–2	Bodrumspor	Ankara
13:45	Cerci 24' (pen.); Kehinde 72'; Cerci 76' (pen.)		Ekinci 29'; Aktaş 35'	Stadium: OSTİM

18 December 2018	Balıkesirspor Baltok	1–1	Çaykur Rizespor	Balıkesir
15:00	Şahintürk 75'		Gladky 59' (pen.)	Stadium: Balıkesir Atatürk

18 December 2018	Göztepe	2–1	Nazilli Belediyespor	İzmir
17:00	Ngando 31'; Ngando 52'		Karakabak 12'	Stadium: Bornova Stadium

18 December 2018	İstanbul Başakşehir	2–0	Adana Demirspor	Istanbul
19:00	Epureanu 6'; Frei 33'			Stadium: Başakşehir Fatih Terim Stadium

18 December 2018	Galatasaray	1–1	Keçiörengücü	Istanbul
20:30	Akgün 65'		Balcı 85'	Stadium: Türk Telekom Arena; Attendance: 5,000

19 December 2018	Van BBSK	2–2	Boluspor	Van
13:00	Doğu 4'; Kurtuluş 77'		Sebaihi 2'; Gültekin 66'	Stadium: Van Atatürk

19 December 2018	Etimesgut Belediyespor	0–2	Yeni Malatyaspor	Ankara
13:45			Ildız 54'; Tozlu 88'	Stadium: Etimesgut Belediyesi Atatürk

19 December 2018	Kahramanmaraşspor	2–1	Alanyaspor	Kahramanmaraş
15:00	Kunt 61'; Koca 90'		Bobo 80'	Stadium: 12 Şubat

19 December 2018	Kasımpaşa	4–1	Menemen Belediyespor	Istanbul
17:00	Erboğa 27'; Koita 34' (pen.); Erboğa 38'; Eduok 71'		Baştan 84'	Stadium: Recep Tayyip Erdoğan Stadium

19 December 2018	Kayserispor	4–1	Altay	Kayseri
18:30	Sapunaru 4'; Kravets 37'; Başacıkoğlu 71'; Kravets 82'		Aganovic 80'	Stadium: Kayseri Büyükşehir Belediyesi Kadir Has

19 December 2018	Trabzonspor	5–0	Sivas Belediyespor	Trabzon
20:30	Artarslan 9'; Ekuban 17'; Ekuban 35'; Amiri 52'; Parmak 78'			Stadium: Şenol Güneş Stadium

20 December 2018	Hatayspor	2–0	Gençlerbirliği	Antakya
13:00	Kurumuş 37'; Bağ 47'			Stadium: Antakya Atatürk Stadium

20 December 2018	Darıca Gençlerbirliği	0–1	Antalyaspor	Kocaeli
13:45			Barrada 46'	Stadium: Darıca İlçe

20 December 2018	Akhisarspor	2–0	Fatih Karagümrük	Akhisar
18:00	Manu 73'; Bokila 90+3' (pen.)			Stadium: Spor Toto Akhisar Stadium

20 December 2018	Giresunspor	2–5	Fenerbahçe	Giresun
20:30	Azza 14'; Okumak 68' (pen.)		Soldado 7'; Ekici 49'; Ekici 55'; Topal 73'; Reyes 89'	Stadium: Giresun Atatürk

== Brackets ==
First round
1	Trabzonspor	2	3	5
16	Balıkesirspor Baltok	1	1	2
8	Ümraniyespor	1	1	2
9	Fenerbahçe	0	0	0
5	Kayserispor	1	0	1
12	Akhisarspor	2	0	2
4	Alanyaspor	0	0	0
13	Kasımpaşa (a.e.t.)	0	1	1
6	Boluspor	0	1	1
11	Galatasaray	1	4	5
3	İstanbul Başakşehir	1	1	2
14	Hatayspor	0	4	4
7	Yeni Malatyaspor	3	2	5
10	Bodrumspor	2	1	3
2	Antalyaspor	3	0	3
15	Göztepe	3	3	6

Quarter-finals
Trabzonspor	0	1	1
Ümraniyespor	0	3	3
Akhisarspor	3	2	5
Kasımpaşa	1	1	2
Galatasaray (a)	2	2	4
Hatayspor	0	4	4
Yeni Malatyaspor (a.e.t.) (p)	1	0	1 (5)
Göztepe	0	1	1 (3)

Semi-finals
Ümraniyespor	0	0	0
Akhisarspor	1	1	2
Galatasaray	0	5	5
Yeni Malatyaspor	0	2	2

Final
Akhisarspor	1
Galatasaray	3

== Round of 16 ==
- 11 Super League, 4 First League and 1 Second League teams competed in this round. Seeds were applied in the two-leg round.

Seeded	League	Rank	Unseeded	League	Rank
Galatasaray	SL	1	Akhisarspor	SL	10
Fenerbahçe	SL	2	Alanyaspor	SL	11
İstanbul Başakşehir	SL	3	Antalyaspor	SL	13
Trabzonspor	SL	4	Boluspor	1L	21
Göztepe	SL	5	Ümraniyespor	1L	22
Kasımpaşa	SL	7	Balıkesirspor Baltok	1L	25
Kayserispor	SL	8	Hatayspor	1L	33
Yeni Malatyaspor	SL	9	Bodrumspor	2L	62

SL: Super League, 1L: First League, 2L: Second League. Ranks are determined by the guidelines in 2018–19 Turkish Cup Regulations.

- 6 teams (46%) from Super League and 2 teams (25%) from First League qualified for the next round.
- 5 seeded (63%) and 3 unseeded (37%) teams qualified for the next round.
- Biggest upset was Hatayspor (ranked 33rd) eliminating İstanbul Başakşehir (ranked 3rd).
- Lowest-ranked team qualifying for the next round was Hatayspor (ranked 33rd).
- Highest-ranked team eliminated was Fenerbahçe (ranked 2nd).

=== Summary table ===
Team 1	Agg.	Team 2	1st leg	2nd leg
Alanyaspor	0–1	Kasımpaşa	0–0	0–1 (a.e.t.)
Antalyaspor	3–6	Göztepe	3–3	0–3
Boluspor	1–5	Galatasaray	0–1	1–4
Kayserispor	1–2	Akhisarspor	1–2	0–0
İstanbul Başakşehir	2–4	Hatayspor	1–0	1–4
Trabzonspor	5–2	Balıkesirspor Baltok	2–1	3–1
Ümraniyespor	2–0	Fenerbahçe	1–0	1–0
Yeni Malatyaspor	5–3	Bodrumspor	3–2	2–1

=== First leg ===
15 January 2019	Kayserispor	1–2	Akhisarspor	Kayseri
16:00	Chery 78' (pen.)		Regattin 37'; Turan 46' (o.g.)	Stadium: Kayseri Büyükşehir Belediyesi Kadir Has

15 January 2019	Antalyaspor	3–3	Göztepe	Antalya
18:00	Erdinç 9'; Drole 30'; Erdinç 69' (pen.)		Ngando 50'; Kadu 58'; Borges 86' (pen.)	Stadium: Antalya

16 January 2019	Yeni Malatyaspor	3–2	Bodrumspor	Malatya
16:30	Aleksic 80' (pen.); Pereira 83'; Aleksic 89'		Sol 7'; Kala 45'	Stadium: Malatya Arena

16 January 2019	İstanbul Başakşehir	1–0	Hatayspor	Istanbul
18:30	Adebayor 32'			Stadium: Başakşehir Fatih Terim Stadium

16 January 2019	Trabzonspor	2–1	Balıkesirspor Baltok	Trabzon
20:30	Ekuban 45'; Rodallega 63'		Çalışkan 48'	Stadium: Şenol Güneş Stadium

17 January 2019	Alanyaspor	0–0	Kasımpaşa	Antalya
18:30				Stadium: Bahçeşehir Okulları

17 January 2019	Ümraniyespor	1–0	Fenerbahçe	Istanbul
20:30	Subaşı 82'			Stadium: Ümraniye Belediyesi Şehir

22 January 2019	Boluspor	0–1	Galatasaray	Bolu
19:45			İnan 42' (pen.)	Stadium: Bolu Atatürk

=== Second leg ===
22 January 2019	Akhisarspor	0–0	Kayserispor	Akhisar
18:00				Stadium: Spor Toto Akhisar Stadium

23 January 2019	Bodrumspor	1–2	Yeni Malatyaspor	Muğla
14:00	Türkdoğan 61'		Alıcı 79'; Şişmanoğlu 87'	Stadium: Bodrum İlçe

23 January 2019	Göztepe	3–0	Antalyaspor	İzmir
18:00	Çelik 21' (o.g.); Gürler 39'; Kadah 66'			Stadium: Bornova Stadium

23 January 2019	Balıkesirspor Baltok	1–3	Trabzonspor	Balıkesir
20:30	Beleck 34'		Novak 32'; Parmak 59'; Parmak 87'	Stadium: Balıkesir Atatürk

24 January 2019	Hatayspor	4–1	İstanbul Başakşehir	Antakya
13:00	Abdioğlu 12'; Aydın 25'; Ilgaz 43'; Aydın 65'		Jojic 19'	Stadium: Antakya Atatürk Stadium

24 January 2019	Kasımpaşa	1–0 (a.e.t.)	Alanyaspor	Istanbul
18:00	Serbest 113'			Stadium: Recep Tayyip Erdoğan Stadium

24 January 2019	Fenerbahçe	0–1	Ümraniyespor	Istanbul
20:30			Leandrinho 89'	Stadium: Şükrü Saracoğlu Stadium

29 January 2019	Galatasaray	4–1	Boluspor	Istanbul
20:30	Akgün 19'; Çelik 33'; Akgün 69'; Akgün 78' (pen.)		Bentley 80' (pen.)	Stadium: Türk Telekom Arena

== Quarter-finals ==
- 6 Super League and 2 First League teams competed in this round. Seeds were applied in the two-leg round.

Seeded	League	Rank	Unseeded	League	Rank
Galatasaray	SL	1	Yeni Malatyaspor	SL	9
Trabzonspor	SL	4	Akhisarspor	SL	10
Göztepe	SL	5	Ümraniyespor	1L	22
Kasımpaşa	SL	7	Hatayspor	1L	33

=== Summary table ===
Team 1	Agg.	Team 2	1st leg	2nd leg
Akhisarspor	5–2	Kasımpaşa	3–1	2–1
Galatasaray	4–4 (a)	Hatayspor	2–0	2–4
Trabzonspor	1–3	Ümraniyespor	0–0	1–3
Yeni Malatyaspor	1–1 (5–3 p)	Göztepe	1–0	0–1 (a.e.t.)

=== First leg ===
5 February 2019	Trabzonspor	0–0	Ümraniyespor	Trabzon
20:30				Stadium: Şenol Güneş Stadium

6 February 2019	Yeni Malatyaspor	1–0	Göztepe	Malatya
18:30	Alıcı 44'			Stadium: Malatya Arena

6 February 2019	Galatasaray	2–0	Hatayspor	Istanbul
20:30	Luyindama 7'; Feghouli 90+2'			Stadium: Türk Telekom Arena

7 February 2019	Akhisarspor	3–1	Kasımpaşa	Akhisar
20:30	Cikalleshi 41'; Cikalleshi 51'; Josué 73' (pen.)		Hajradinović 90+3'	Stadium: Spor Toto Akhisar Stadium

=== Second leg ===
26 February 2019	Ümraniyespor	3–1	Trabzonspor	Istanbul
20:00	Leandrinho 55'; Altıntaş 66' (pen.); Çiçek 90+6'		Nwakaeme 35'	Stadium: Başakşehir Fatih Terim Stadium

27 February 2019	Hatayspor	4–2	Galatasaray	Antakya
14:00	Karadeniz 59' (pen.); Karadeniz 71' (pen.); Aydın 79'; Çipe 87' (o.g.)		Çelik 21'; Akbaba 53'	Stadium: Antakya Atatürk Stadium

27 February 2019	Göztepe	1–0 (a.e.t.) (3–5 p)	Yeni Malatyaspor	İzmir
20:00	Jerome 73'			Stadium: Bornova Stadium
	Penalties
	Borges (penalty scored); Gürler (penalty scored); Titi (penalty missed); Ngando (penalty scored)		(penalty scored) Guilherme; (penalty scored) Aleksic; (penalty scored) Pereira; (penalty scored) Çağıran; (penalty scored) Ildız

28 February 2019	Kasımpaşa	1–2	Akhisarspor	Istanbul
20:00	Koita 37'		Barbosa 18'; Josué 84'	Stadium: Recep Tayyip Erdoğan Stadium

== Semi-finals ==
=== Summary table ===
Team 1	Agg.	Team 2	1st leg	2nd leg
Galatasaray	5–2	Yeni Malatyaspor	0–0	5–2
Ümraniyespor	0–2	Akhisarspor	0–1	0–1

=== First leg ===
2 April 2019	Galatasaray	0–0	Yeni Malatyaspor	Istanbul
20:00		Report		Stadium: Türk Telekom Arena; Referee: Halil Umut Meler

3 April 2019	Ümraniyespor	0–1	Akhisarspor	Istanbul
20:00		Report	Bokila 86'	Stadium: Recep Tayyip Erdoğan Stadium; Referee: Abdulkadir Bitigen

=== Second leg ===
24 April 2019	Akhisarspor	1–0	Ümraniyespor	Akhisar
20:00	Cikalleshi 36'	Report		Stadium: Spor Toto Akhisar Stadium; Referee: Zorbay Küçük

25 April 2019	Yeni Malatyaspor	2–5	Galatasaray	Malatya
20:00	Aleksic 45+14' (pen.); Mina 89'	Report	Linnes 5'; Feghouli 39'; Onyekuru 58'; Onyekuru 74'; Mitroglou 83'	Stadium: Malatya Arena; Referee: Alper Ulusoy

== Final ==
15 May 2019
20:45

Akhisarspor	1–3	Galatasaray
Manu 57'	Report	Gümüş 80' (pen.); Feghouli 88'; Diagne 90+4'

4 Eylül Stadium, Sivas
Referee: Suat Arslanboğa

== Top goalscorers ==
Rank	Player	Club	Goals
1	(Turkey) Batuhan Altıntaş	Boluspor	5
1	(Argentina) Lucas Villafáñez	Alanyaspor	5
1	(Albania) Sokol Cikalleshi	Akhisarspor	5
2	(Turkey) Abdülkadir Parmak	Trabzonspor	4
2	(Italy) Alessio Cerci	MKE Ankaragücü	4
2	(Turkey) Ali Yıldırım	Kilis Belediyespor	4
2	(Brazil) Barrios Leandrinho	Ümraniyespor	4
2	(Serbia) Danijel Aleksic	Yeni Malatyaspor	4
2	(France) Steve Beleck	Balıkesirspor Baltok	4
2	(Turkey) Yunus Akgün	Galatasaray	4
