= Kayılar, Orta =

Village in Turkey

Kayılar
- Neighbourhood
- Location in Turkey Kayılar (Turkey Central Anatolia)
- Coordinates: 40°32′N 33°05′E
- Country: Turkey
- Province: Çankırı
- District: Orta
- Municipality: Yaylakent
- Population (2021): 386
- Time zone: UTC+3 (TRT)

Kayılar is a neighbourhood of the town Yaylakent, Orta District, Çankırı Province, Turkey. Its population is 386 (2021).
