= Elmalık =

Elmalık can refer to:

- Elmalık, Bolu
- Elmalık, Orta
