= Karaağaç, Orta =

Village in Turkey

Karaağaç
- Village
- Country: Turkey
- Province: Çankırı
- District: Orta
- Population (2021): 102
- Time zone: UTC+3 (TRT)

Karaağaç is a village in the Orta District of Çankırı Province in Turkey. Its population is 102 (2021).
