= Henry Onyekuru =

Nigerian footballer (born 1997)

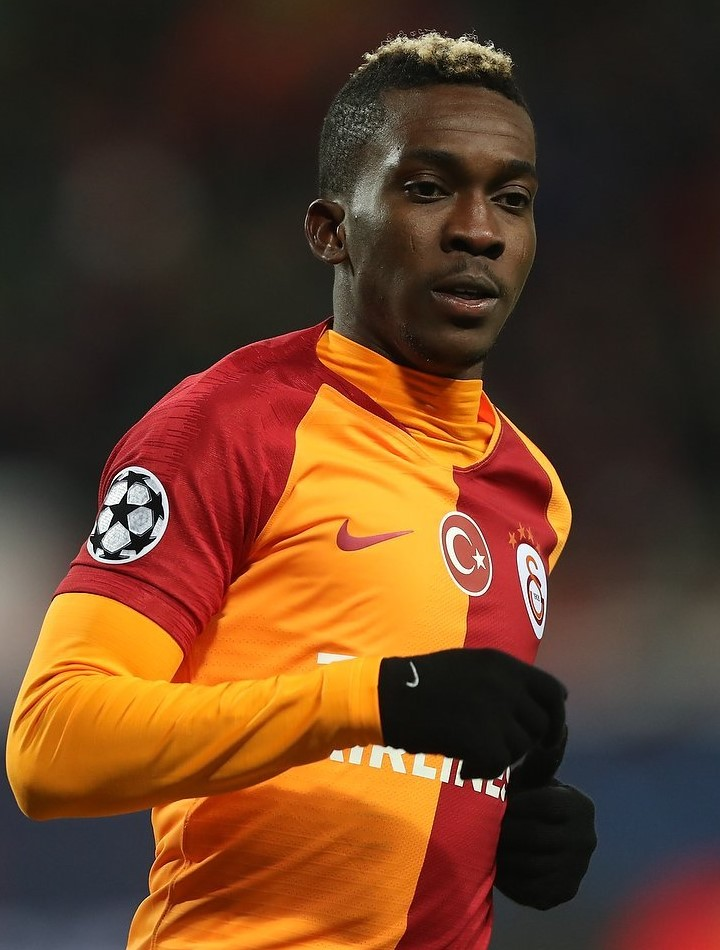

Personal information
- Full name: Henry Chukwuemeka Onyekuru
- Date of birth: 5 June 1997 (age 29)
- Place of birth: Lagos, Nigeria
- Height: 1.75 m (5 ft 9 in)
- Position: Winger

Youth career
- 2010–2015: Aspire Academy

Senior career*
Years	Team	Apps	(Gls)
2015–2017	Eupen	57	(28)
2017–2019	Everton	0	(0)
2017–2018	→ Anderlecht (loan)	19	(9)
2018–2019	→ Galatasaray (loan)	31	(14)
2019–2021	Monaco	8	(0)
2020	→ Galatasaray (loan)	10	(1)
2021	→ Galatasaray (loan)	14	(5)
2021–2023	Olympiacos	14	(0)
2022–2023	→ Adana Demirspor (loan)	28	(8)
2023	Adana Demirspor	0	(0)
2023–2025	Al-Fayha	31	(10)
2025–2026	Gençlerbirliği	17	(0)

International career^{‡}
2017–2022	Nigeria	15	(1)
Medal record
Africa Cup of Nations
Third place	2019 Egypt
- * Club domestic league appearances and goals as of 10 June 2026 ‡ National team caps and goals as of 19 January 2022

Henry Chukwuemeka Onyekuru (born 5 June 1997) is a Nigerian professional footballer who plays as a winger for Nigeria national team.

== Club career ==
=== Eupen ===
Onyekuru began his football career with the Aspire Academy in 2010, and graduated in 2015 joining their partner club, K.A.S. Eupen. He made his debut for Eupen on 5 September 2015 in a 2–2 tie against K.F.C. Dessel Sport in the Belgian Second Division. Onyekuru helped the team get promoted to the Belgian First Division A in his debut season, and made his professional debut in a 3–0 loss on 30 July 2016 against S.V. Zulte Waregem. After a successful season in the Belgium first division, Onyekuru finished as one of the top scorers in the league, catching the attention of various larger teams in Europe. He finished the 2016–17 season as joint top-scorer with 22 goals, but the trophy was handed to Łukasz Teodorczyk as he scored more away goals than Onyekuru.

=== Everton ===
On 30 June 2017, Onyekuru joined Everton for £7 million and was immediately sent on loan to Anderlecht. Onyekuru had been handed the number nine jersey at Anderlecht for the 2017–18 campaign.

Having scored 10 goals in 28 matches for Anderlecht, Onyekuru suffered a knee ligament injury in December which would require surgery. Anderlecht announced surgery would be necessary and that he would be out of action "for several months". In January 2018, it was reported that Onyekuru would return to Anderlecht after rehabilitation and full recovery.

==== Loan to Galatasaray ====
In July 2018, Onyekuru joined Galatasaray on a season-long loan. The loan fee paid to Everton was reported as £700,000. On 20 May 2019, Onyekuru was on the scoresheet for Galatasaray as they defeated title challengers İstanbul Başakşehir 2–1 to secure the Süper Lig championship for the second straight season. The victory also meant that Galatasaray secured the domestic double having defeated Akhisar Belediyespor in the Turkish Cup final the week prior.

=== Monaco ===
Having failed to ever secure a work permit in the UK, Onyekuru joined AS Monaco on a permanent transfer on 12 August 2019. The fee was undisclosed (rumoured to be between £12-£15 million) and Onyekuru signed a five-year deal with the Ligue 1 club.

==== Return to Galatasaray on loan ====
On 5 January 2020, Onyekuru signed for Galatasaray, his former club, on a six-month loan with no option to buy. He left after his loan ended in June, making a total of twelve appearances and scoring one goal.

On 25 January 2021, Onyekuru once again signed for Galatasaray on a six-month loan, this time with an option to buy.

=== Olympiacos ===
On 2 August 2021, Olympiacos announced the signing of Onyekuru for a four-year deal for an undisclosed amount.

=== Al-Fayha ===
On 11 August 2023, Onyekuru joined Saudi Pro League club Al-Fayha on a two-year contract.

=== Gençlerbirliği ===
On 23 July 2025, Onyekuru joined Süper Lig club Gençlerbirliği on a free transfer.

== International career ==
Onyekuru was called up for the Super Eagles camp in May 2017. He made his senior debut for Nigeria in a 3–0 friendly win over Togo on 1 June 2017.

After a strong 2018–19 club season with Galatasaray, Onyekuru was included in Nigeria's final 23-man squad for the 2019 Africa Cup of Nations in Egypt. He played for 12 minutes at the finals, coming on as a late substitute in their 1–2 semi-final defeat to eventual champions Algeria.

Onyekuru was invited by the national coach as part of the squad to face Ukraine in an international friendly on the 10 of September 2019.

== Career statistics ==
=== Club ===
As of match played 26 May 2025

Appearances and goals by club, season and competition
Club	Season	League			National cup (Note: Includes Belgian Cup, Turkish Cup, Greek Football Cup, King's Cup)		Continental		Other		Total	
Club	Season	Division	Apps	Goals	Apps	Goals	Apps	Goals	Apps	Goals	Apps	Goals
Eupen	2015–16	Belgian Second Division	19	6	0	0	—		—		19	6
Eupen	2016–17	Belgian Pro League	38	22	3	2	—		—		41	24
Eupen	Total		57	28	3	2	—		—		60	30
Everton	2017–18	Premier League	0	0	0	0	—		—		0	0
Anderlecht (loan)	2017–18	Belgian Pro League	19	9	2	1	6 (Note: Appearances in UEFA Champions League)	0	1 (Note: Appearances in Belgian Super Cup)	0	28	10
Galatasaray (loan)	2018–19	Süper Lig	31	14	6	2	7 (Note: Five appearances in UEFA Champions League, two appearances in UEFA Europa League)	0	0	0	44	16
Monaco	2019–20	Ligue 1	4	0	0	0	—		—		4	0
Monaco	2020–21	Ligue 1	4	0	0	0	—		—		4	0
Monaco	Total		8	0	0	0	—		—		8	0
Galatasaray (loan)	2019–20	Süper Lig	10	1	2	0	—		—		12	1
Galatasaray (loan)	2020–21	Süper Lig	14	5	1	0	—		—		15	5
Galatasaray (loan)	Total		24	6	3	0	—		—		27	6
Olympiacos	2021–22	Super League Greece	14	0	3	0	10 (Note: Appearances in UEFA Europa League)	1	—		27	1
Adana Demirspor (loan)	2022–23	Süper Lig	18	8	2	0	—		—		20	8
Al-Fayha	2023–24	Saudi Pro League	27	10	1	0	6 (Note: Appearances in AFC Champions League)	1	—		34	11
Al-Fayha	2024–25	Saudi Pro League	4	0	0	0	—		—		4	0
Al-Fayha	Total		31	10	1	0	6	1	—		38	11
Gençlerbirliği	2025–26	Süper Lig	0	0	0	0	—		—		0	0
Career total			195	75	20	5	29	2	1	0	245	82

=== International ===
As of match played on 19 January 2022

Appearances and goals by national team and year
National team	Year	Apps	Goals
Nigeria	2017	1	0
Nigeria	2018	6	0
Nigeria	2019	5	1
Nigeria	2020	0	0
Nigeria	2021	2	0
Nigeria	2022	1	0
Total		15	1

As of goal scored 22 March 2019
Scores and results list Nigeria's goal tally first, score column indicates score after each Onyekuru goal.

No.	Date	Venue	Opponent	Score	Result	Competition
1.	22 March 2019	Stephen Keshi Stadium, Asaba, Nigeria	Seychelles	2–1	3–1	2019 Africa Cup of Nations qualification

== Honours ==
Anderlecht

- Belgian Super Cup: 2017

Galatasaray

- Süper Lig: 2018–19
- Turkish Cup: 2018–19

Olympiacos

- Super League Greece: 2021–22
