= Dodurga, Orta =

Village in Turkey

Dodurga
- Municipality
- Location in Turkey Dodurga (Turkey Central Anatolia)
- Coordinates: 40°36′4″N 32°59′19″E
- Country: Turkey
- Province: Çankırı
- District: Orta
- Population (2021): 1,871
- Time zone: UTC+3 (TRT)

Dodurga is a town (belde) in the Orta District, Çankırı Province, Turkey. Its population is 1,871 (2021).
