= Ortabayındır, Orta =

Village in Turkey

Ortabayındır
- Village
- Location in Turkey Ortabayındır (Turkey Central Anatolia)
- Coordinates: 40°34′N 32°59′E
- Country: Turkey
- Province: Çankırı
- District: Orta
- Population (2021): 71
- Time zone: UTC+3 (TRT)

Ortabayındır is a village in the Orta District of Çankırı Province in Turkey. Its population is 71 (2021).
