= Yunus Akgün =

Turkish footballer (born 2000)

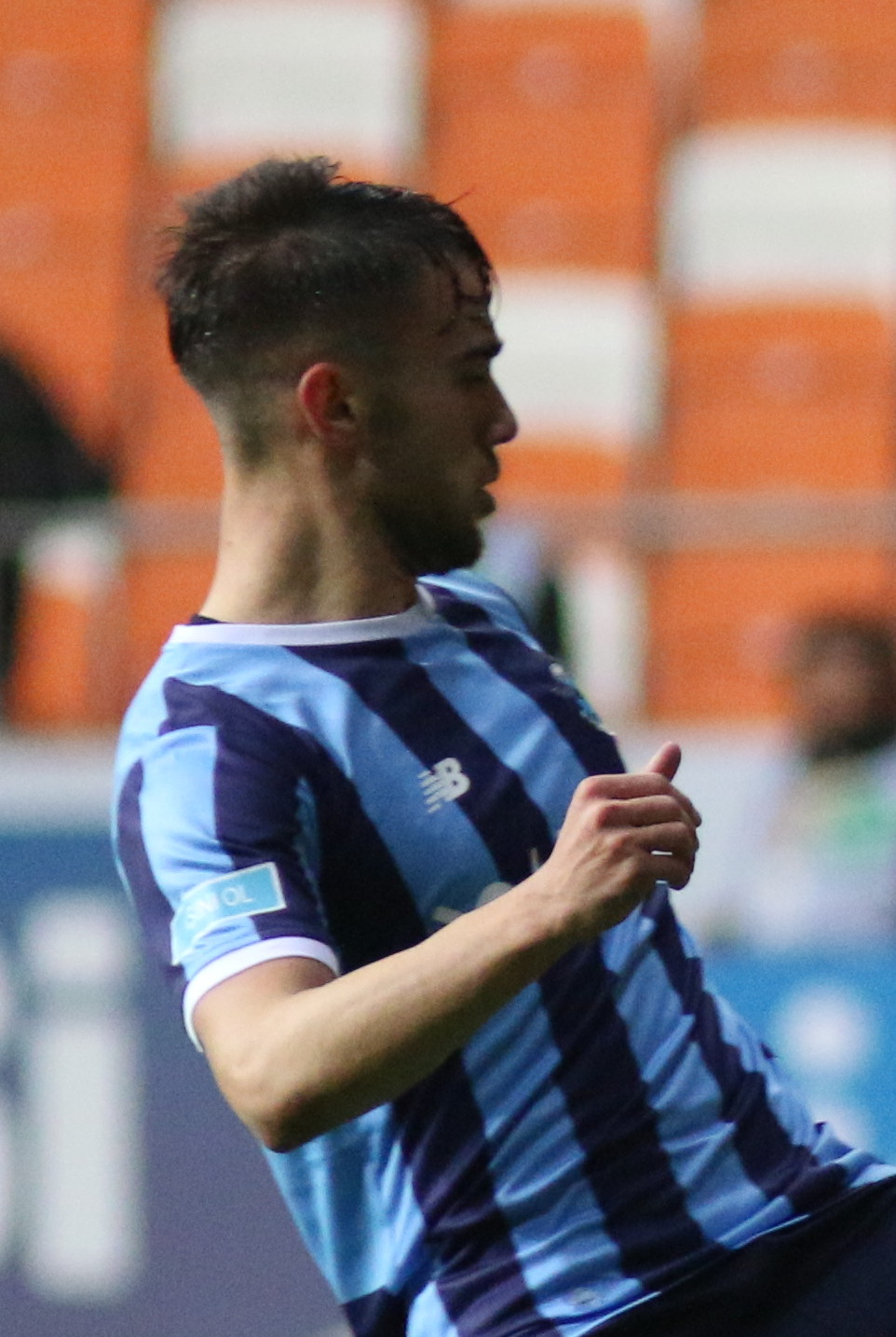
- Akgün playing for Adana Demirspor in 2022

Personal information
- Full name: Yunus Akgün
- Date of birth: 7 July 2000 (age 26)
- Place of birth: Küçükçekmece, Turkey
- Height: 1.73 m (5 ft 8 in)
- Positions: Attacking midfielder; right winger

Team information
- Current team: Galatasaray
- Number: 11

Youth career
- Kosova Güç Spor
- 2011–2018: Galatasaray

Senior career*
Years	Team	Apps	(Gls)
2018–	Galatasaray	108	(17)
2020–2022	→ Adana Demirspor (loan)	62	(13)
2023–2024	→ Leicester City (loan)	23	(1)

International career^{‡}
2015–2016	Turkey U16	9	(2)
2016–2017	Turkey U17	24	(4)
2018–2019	Turkey U19	9	(4)
2019	Turkey U20	1	(0)
2019	Turkey U21	4	(0)
2022–	Turkey	25	(4)
- * Club domestic league appearances and goals as of 23:16, 21 August 2026 (UTC) ‡ National team caps and goals as of 15 November 2026

Yunus Akgün (born 7 July 2000) is a Turkish professional footballer who plays as an attacking midfielder or right winger for Süper Lig club Galatasaray and the Turkey national team.

== Early life ==
Yunus Akgün was born on July 7, 2000, into a family of four in the Küçükçekmece district of Istanbul. His mother is a homemaker, while his father previously worked in a factory and later took on a supportive role in his son’s career. He has a younger brother, born in 2008, who is also involved in football and has played for Akgün’s former youth club, Kosova Güç Spor. Akgün’s family background includes roots in Kastamonu on his mother’s side, while his father is of Albanian descent.

== Club career ==
=== Galatasaray ===
Akgün is a product of the Galatasaray youth academy, joining in 2011. He made his professional debut for Galatasaray in the 2018 Turkish Super Cup 1–1 (5–4) penalty shootout loss against Akhisar Belediyespor on 5 August 2018. On 29 January 2019, Akgün scored a hat-trick in 4–1 win of Turkish Cup match against Boluspor.

==== Adana Demirspor (loan) ====
On 6 September 2021, Adana Demirspor brought in Akgün on a loan from Galatasaray.

==== Return to Galatasaray after loan ====
Akgün became the champion in the Süper Lig in the 2022–23 season with the Galatasaray team. Defeating Ankaragücü 4–1 away in the match played in the 36th week on 30 May 2023, Galatasaray secured the lead with two weeks before the end and won the 23rd championship in its history.

==== Leicester City (loan) ====
On 26 August 2023, Leicester City signed Akgün on loan for the 2023–24 season. He made his debut for the club three days later in a 2–0 away win against Tranmere Rovers in the second round of the EFL Cup. On 27 January 2024, he scored his first goal for the club in a 3–0 home win against Birmingham City in the fourth round of the FA Cup.

==== Return to Galatasaray after second loan ====
After a successful summer at Euro 2024, Akgün had a promising start to the 2024–25 season with Galatasaray. As of mid-October 2024, he had played 13 matches across all competitions, scoring 5 goals and providing 1 assist. In addition to his goal contributions, Akgün showed versatility by playing on both wings and has been a regular starter in both the Süper Lig and Europa League matches. His form has allowed him to cement his position as a key player for Galatasaray, filling in after key departures like Kerem Aktürkoğlu and Wilfried Zaha.

On August 5, 2025, it was announced that his contract was extended until the end of the 2028–29 season.

== International career ==
Akgün is a youth international for Turkey. He represented the Turkey U17s at the 2017 UEFA European Under-17 Championship, and the 2017 FIFA U-17 World Cup.

Akgün made his senior debut for Turkey on 4 June 2022, in a UEFA Nations League tie at home to the Faroe Islands. Akgün scored his first senior level goal for Turkey on the occasion of his second cap, scoring the fifth goal of six away to Lithuania on 7 June 2022 in another UEFA Nations League tie.

He was named in Turkey's 26-man squad for UEFA Euro 2024.

On 2 June 2026, Akgün was selected in the 26-man squad for the 2026 FIFA World Cup.

== Career statistics ==
=== Club ===
As of match played 21 October 2026

Appearances and goals by club, season and competition
Club	Season	League			National cup (Note: Includes Turkish Cup, FA Cup)		League cup (Note: Includes EFL Cup)		Europe		Other		Total	
Club	Season	Division	Apps	Goals	Apps	Goals	Apps	Goals	Apps	Goals	Apps	Goals	Apps	Goals
Galatasaray	2018–19	Süper Lig	11	0	6	4	—		2 (Note: Appearances in UEFA Europa League)	0	1 (Note: Appearance(s) in Turkish Super Cup)	0	20	4
Galatasaray	2019–20	Süper Lig	5	1	2	0	—		0	0	0	0	7	1
Galatasaray	2021–22	Süper Lig	0	0	0	0	—		1 (Note: Appearances in UEFA Champions League)	0	—		1	0
Galatasaray	2022–23	Süper Lig	25	1	3	0	—		—		—		28	1
Galatasaray	2023–24	Süper Lig	1	0	0	0	—		4	0	0	0	5	0
Galatasaray	2024–25	Süper Lig	30	7	5	0	—		8	5	1	0	44	12
Galatasaray	2025–26	Süper Lig	28	7	3	0	—		9	2	2	1	42	10
Galatasaray	2026–27	Süper Lig	8	1	0	0	—		3	1	0	0	11	2
Galatasaray	Total		108	17	19	4	—		27	8	4	1	158	30
Adana Demirspor (loan)	2020–21	TFF First League	28	5	4	2	—		—		—		32	7
Adana Demirspor (loan)	2021–22	Süper Lig	34	8	4	1	—		—		—		38	9
Adana Demirspor (loan)	Total		62	13	8	3	—		—		—		70	16
Leicester City (loan)	2023–24	Championship	23	1	4	1	2	0	—		—		29	2
Career total			193	31	31	8	2	0	27	8	4	1	257	48

=== International ===
As of match played 15 November 2026

Appearances and goals by national team and year
National team	Year	Apps	Goals
Turkey	2022	5	1
Turkey	2023	2	1
Turkey	2024	7	0
Turkey	2025	3	1
Turkey	2026	8	1
Total		25	4

Turkey score listed first, score column indicates score after each Akgün goal.

List of international goals scored by Yunus Akgün
No.	Date	Venue	Cap	Opponent	Score	Result	Competition	Ref.
1	7 June 2022	LFF Stadium, Vilnius, Lithuania	2	Lithuania	5–0	6–0	2022–23 UEFA Nations League C	
2	15 October 2023	Konya Metropolitan Municipality Stadium, Konya, Turkey	6	Latvia	1–0	4–0	UEFA Euro 2024 qualifying	
3	14 October 2025	Kocaeli Stadium, İzmit, Turkey	17	Georgia	4–0	4–1	2026 FIFA World Cup qualification	
4	6 June 2026	Chase Stadium, Fort Lauderdale, United States	19	Venezuela	2–1	2–1	Friendly	

== Honours ==
Galatasaray

- Süper Lig: 2018–19, 2022–23, 2024–25, 2025–26
- Turkish Cup: 2018–19, 2024–25
- Turkish Super Cup: 2019

Adana Demirspor

- TFF First League: 2020–21

Leicester City

- EFL Championship: 2023–24
