= Kalfat, Orta =

Village in Turkey

Kalfat
- Village
- Location in Turkey Kalfat (Turkey Central Anatolia)
- Coordinates: 40°40′09″N 33°06′03″E
- Country: Turkey
- Province: Çankırı
- District: Orta
- Population (2021): 1,397
- Time zone: UTC+3 (TRT)

Kalfat is a village in the Orta District of Çankırı Province in Turkey. Its population is 1,397 (2021). Before the 2013 reorganisation, it was a town (belde).
