= Buğurören, Orta =

Village in Turkey

Buğurören
- Village
- Location in Turkey Buğurören (Turkey Central Anatolia)
- Coordinates: 40°38′36″N 32°59′50″E
- Country: Turkey
- Province: Çankırı
- District: Orta
- Population (2021): 166
- Time zone: UTC+3 (TRT)

Buğurören is a village in the Orta District of Çankırı Province in Turkey. Its population is 166 (2021).
