= Tutmaçbayındır, Orta =

Village in Turkey

Tutmaçbayındır
- Village
- Location in Turkey Tutmaçbayındır (Turkey Central Anatolia)
- Coordinates: 40°33′N 32°58′E
- Country: Turkey
- Province: Çankırı
- District: Orta
- Population (2021): 66
- Time zone: UTC+3 (TRT)

Tutmaçbayındır is a village in the Orta District of Çankırı Province in Turkey. Its population is 66 (2021).
