= Yuva, Orta =

Village in Turkey

Yuva
- Village
- Location in Turkey Yuva (Turkey Central Anatolia)
- Coordinates: 40°37′12″N 33°2′19″E
- Country: Turkey
- Province: Çankırı
- District: Orta
- Population (2021): 102
- Time zone: UTC+3 (TRT)

Yuva is a village in the Orta District of Çankırı Province in Turkey. Its population is 102 (2021).
