= Yenice, Orta =

Village in Turkey

Yenice
- Village
- Location in Turkey Yenice (Turkey Central Anatolia)
- Coordinates: 40.5583°N 33.2255°E
- Country: Turkey
- Province: Çankırı
- District: Orta
- Population (2021): 141
- Time zone: UTC+3 (TRT)

Yenice is a village in the Orta District of Çankırı Province in Turkey. Its population is 141 (2021).
