= Elden, Orta =

Village in Turkey

Elden
- Village
- Location in Turkey Elden (Turkey Central Anatolia)
- Coordinates: 40°39′21″N 32°57′17″E
- Country: Turkey
- Province: Çankırı
- District: Orta
- Population (2021): 93
- Time zone: UTC+3 (TRT)
- Postal code: 18000

Elden is a village in the Orta District of Çankırı Province in Turkey. Its population is 93 (2021).
