= Sakarcaören, Orta =

Village in Turkey

Sakarcaören
- Village
- Location in Turkey Sakarcaören (Turkey Central Anatolia)
- Coordinates: 40°37′11″N 33°09′00″E
- Country: Turkey
- Province: Çankırı
- District: Orta
- Population (2021): 116
- Time zone: UTC+3 (TRT)

Sakarcaören is a village in the Orta District of Çankırı Province in Turkey. Its population is 116 (2021).
