= Kırsakal, Orta =

Village in Turkey

Kırsakal
- Village
- Location in Turkey Kırsakal (Turkey Central Anatolia)
- Coordinates: 40°39′31″N 33°08′59″E
- Country: Turkey
- Province: Çankırı
- District: Orta
- Population (2021): 84
- Time zone: UTC+3 (TRT)

Kırsakal is a village in the Orta District of Çankırı Province in Turkey. Its population is 84 (2021).
