= Hüyükköy, Orta =

Village in Turkey

Hüyükköy
- Village
- Country: Turkey
- Province: Çankırı
- District: Orta
- Population (2021): 110
- Time zone: UTC+3 (TRT)

Hüyükköy is a village in the Orta District of Çankırı Province in Turkey. Its population is 110 (2021).
