= Sakaeli, Orta =

Village in Turkey

Sakaeli
- Village
- Location in Turkey Sakaeli (Turkey Central Anatolia)
- Coordinates: 40°41′N 33°10′E
- Country: Turkey
- Province: Çankırı
- District: Orta
- Population (2021): 245
- Time zone: UTC+3 (TRT)

Sakaeli is a village in the Orta District of Çankırı Province in Turkey. Its population is 245 (2021).
