= Salur, Orta =

Village in Turkey

Salur
- Village
- Location within Turkey Location within Turkey Central Anatolia
- Country: Turkey
- Province: Çankırı
- District: Orta
- Population (2021): 66
- Time zone: UTC+3 (TRT)

Salur is a village in the Orta District of Çankırı Province in Turkey. Its population is 66 (2021).
