= Hasanhacı, Orta =

Village in Turkey

Hasanhacı
- Village
- Location in Turkey Hasanhacı (Turkey Central Anatolia)
- Coordinates: 40°35′N 33°03′E
- Country: Turkey
- Province: Çankırı
- District: Orta
- Population (2021): 195
- Time zone: UTC+3 (TRT)

Hasanhacı is a village in the Orta District of Çankırı Province in Turkey. Its population is 195 (2021).
