= Doğanlar, Orta =

Village in Turkey

Doğanlar
- Village
- Country: Turkey
- Province: Çankırı
- District: Orta
- Population (2021): 47
- Time zone: UTC+3 (TRT)

Doğanlar is a village in the Orta District of Çankırı Province in Turkey. Its population is 47 (2021).
