= İncecik, Orta =

Village in Turkey

İncecik
- Village
- Country: Turkey
- Province: Çankırı
- District: Orta
- Population (2021): 148
- Time zone: UTC+3 (TRT)

İncecik is a village in the Orta District of Çankırı Province in Turkey. Its population is 148 (2021).
