= Derebayındır, Orta =

Village in Turkey

Derebayındır
- Village
- Location within Turkey Location within Turkey Central Anatolia
- Coordinates: 40°34′48″N 32°59′38″E
- Country: Turkey
- Province: Çankırı
- District: Orta
- Population (2021): 53
- Time zone: UTC+3 (TRT)

Derebayındır is a village in the Orta District of Çankırı Province in Turkey. Its population is 53 (2021).
