= Ethem Erboğa =

Turkish footballer

Personal information
- Full name: Mustafa Ethem Erboğa
- Date of birth: 11 January 1999 (age 27)
- Place of birth: Orta, Turkey
- Height: 1.86 m (6 ft 1 in)
- Position: Forward

Team information
- Current team: Serik Belediyespor
- Number: 99

Youth career
- 2011–2013: Galatasaray
- 2013–2014: Avcılar Belediyespor
- 2014–2016: Beşiktaş
- 2016: Bursaspor
- 2016–2018: Kasımpaşa

Senior career*
Years	Team	Apps	(Gls)
2018–2023	Kasımpaşa	2	(0)
2018	→ Kızılcabölükspor (loan)	17	(8)
2019	→ Sultanbeyli Belediyespor (loan)	11	(1)
2019–2020	→ Kızılcabölükspor (loan)	19	(8)
2020–2021	→ 24 Erzincanspor (loan)	40	(24)
2021–2022	→ 1461 Trabzon (loan)	15	(5)
2022	→ 24 Erzincanspor (loan)	16	(5)
2022–2023	→ Şanlıurfaspor (loan)	13	(1)
2023	→ Büyükçekmece Tepecikspor (loan)	7	(1)
2023–	Serik Belediyespor	5	(0)

International career^{‡}
2015	Turkey U16	3	(0)
- * Club domestic league appearances and goals as of 23 September 2023 ‡ National team caps and goals as of 22:08, 3 December 2019 (UTC)

Mustafa Ethem Erboğa (born 11 January 1999) is a Turkish professional footballer who plays as a forward for Serik Belediyespor.

== Professional career ==
Erboğa begun his senior career on loan with Kızılcabölükspor from Kasımpaşa on 29 January 2018. Erboğa made his professional debut for Kasımpaşa for Alanyaspor on 23 September 2018.
