= Yaylakent, Orta =

Village in Turkey

Yaylakent
- Municipality
- Location in Turkey Yaylakent (Turkey Central Anatolia)
- Coordinates: 40°35′28″N 33°05′49″E
- Country: Turkey
- Province: Çankırı
- District: Orta
- Population (2021): 2,881
- Time zone: UTC+3 (TRT)

Yaylakent is a town (belde) in the Orta District, Çankırı Province, Turkey. Its population is 2,881 (2021). The town consists of 4 quarters: Hürriyet, Cumhuriyet, Inkılap and Kayılar.
