= Büğdüz, Orta =

Village in Turkey

Büğdüz
- Village
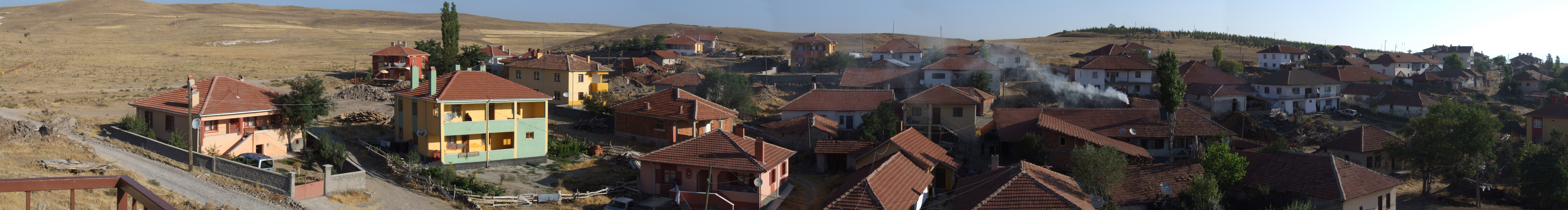

- Location within Turkey Location within Turkey Central Anatolia
- Coordinates: 40.6049°N 33.0534°E
- Country: Turkey
- Province: Çankırı
- District: Orta
- Population (2021): 99
- Time zone: UTC+3 (TRT)

Büğdüz is a village in the Orta District of Çankırı Province in Turkey. Its population is 99 (2021).
