= Orta, Çankırı =

Orta
- Municipality
- Location within Turkey Location within Turkey Central Anatolia
- Coordinates: 40°37′27″N 33°06′33″E
- Country: Turkey
- Province: Çankırı
- District: Orta

Government
  - Mayor: Bayram Yavuz Onay (AKP)
- Elevation: 1,286 m (4,219 ft)
- Population (2021): 3,635
- Time zone: UTC+3 (TRT)
- Area code: 0376
- Website: www.orta.bel.tr

Orta, formerly Kara Pazar, is a town in Çankırı Province in the Central Anatolia region of Turkey. It is the seat of Orta District. Its population is 3,635 (2021). Its elevation is 1,286 m (4,219 ft).

== See also ==
- Gökçeören, Orta
