= Gökay Güney =

Turkish footballer (born 1999)

Personal information
- Date of birth: 19 May 1999 (age 27)
- Place of birth: Bakırköy, Turkey
- Height: 1.80 m (5 ft 11 in)
- Position: Centre back

Team information
- Current team: Kırşehir Futbol SK

Youth career
- 2011–2018: Galatasaray

Senior career*
Years	Team	Apps	(Gls)
2018–2023	Galatasaray	1	(0)
2020–2021	→ Bandırmaspor (loan)	31	(0)
2023–	Kırşehir Futbol SK	4	(0)

International career^{‡}
2016–2017	Turkey U18	5	(0)
2017–2018	Turkey U19	14	(0)
2018	Turkey U21	2	(0)
- * Club domestic league appearances and goals as of 24 September 2023 ‡ National team caps and goals as of 12 May 2018

Gökay Güney (born 19 May 1999) is a Turkish professional footballer who plays as a centre-back for the Turkish club Kırşehir Futbol SK in the TFF Second League.

== Professional career ==
=== Galatasaray ===
Güney made his professional debut for Galatasaray in a 6-0 Süper Lig win over MKE Ankaragücü on 19 January 2019.

=== Bandırmaspor (loan) ===
On 3 August 2021, Bandırmaspor, one of the TFF First League teams, hired Galatasaray's football player, defender Güney, for 1 more year.

=== Kırşehir Futbol SK ===
On 25 July 2023, he signed a 2-year contract with Kırşehir Futbol SK.

== International career ==
Güney is a youth international for Turkey. He represented the Turkey U19s at the 2018 UEFA European Under-19 Championship.

== Honours ==
Galatasaray

- Süper Lig: 2018–19
- Turkish Cup: 2018–19
- Turkish Super Cup: 2016, 2019
