= Elmalık, Orta =

Village in Turkey

Elmalık
- Village
- Country: Turkey
- Province: Çankırı
- District: Orta
- Population (2021): 509
- Time zone: UTC+3 (TRT)

Elmalık is a village in the Orta District of Çankırı Province in Turkey. Its population is 509 (2021). Before the 2013 reorganisation, it was a town (belde).
