= Orta District =

District of Çankırı Province, Turkey

- District
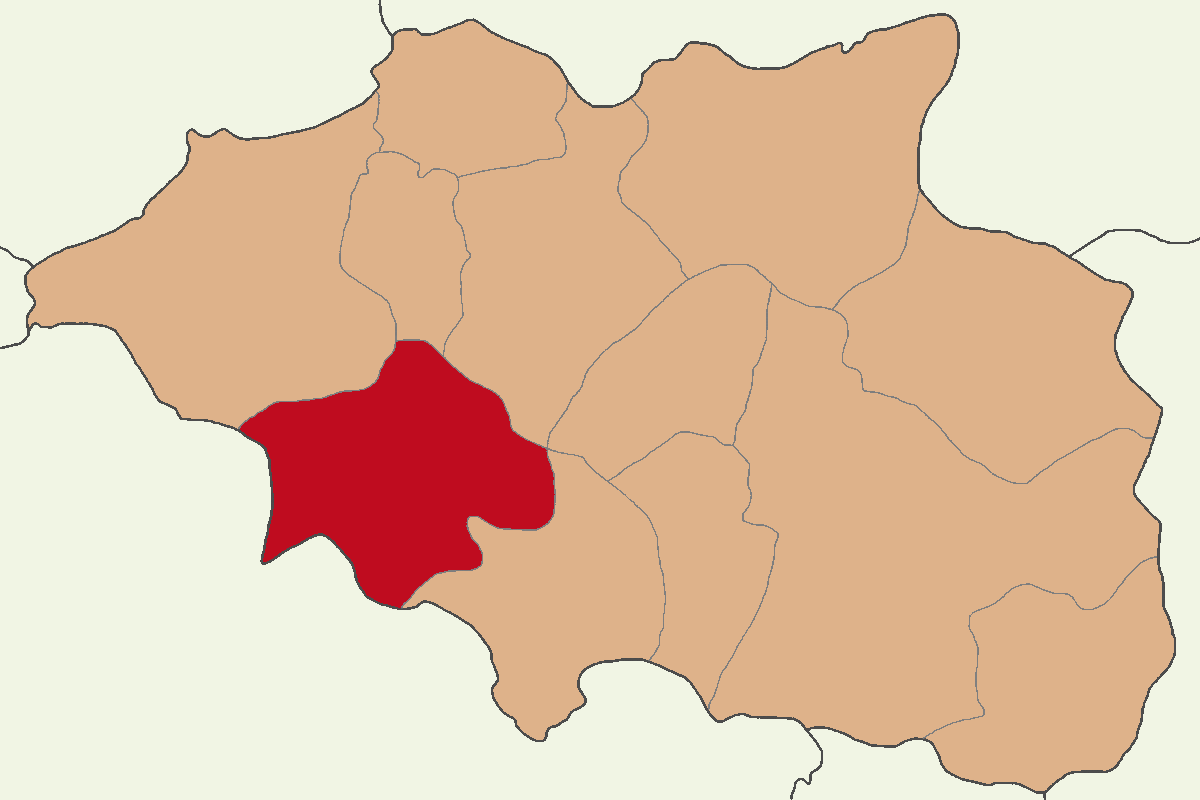
- Map showing Orta District in Çankırı Province

- Location in Turkey Orta District (Turkey Central Anatolia)
- Coordinates: 40°37′N 33°06′E
- Country: Turkey
- Province: Çankırı
- Seat: Orta

Government
  - Kaymakam: Mehmet Ali Uzun
- Area: 706 km^{2} (273 sq mi)
- Population (2021): 13,207
  - Density: 19/km^{2} (48/sq mi)
- Time zone: UTC+3 (TRT)
- Website: www.orta.gov.tr

Orta District is a district of the Çankırı Province of Turkey. Its seat is the town of Orta. Its area is 706 km^{2}, and its population is 13,207 (2021).

== Composition ==
There are three municipalities in Orta District:

- Dodurga
- Orta
- Yaylakent

There are 24 villages in Orta District:

- Buğurören
- Büğdüz
- Derebayındır
- Doğanlar
- Elden
- Elmalık
- Gökçeören
- Hasanhacı
- Hüyükköy
- İncecik
- Kalfat
- Karaağaç
- Kayıören
- Kırsakal
- Kısaç
- Ortabayındır
- Özlü
- Sakaeli
- Sakarcaören
- Salur
- Sancar
- Tutmaçbayındır
- Yenice
- Yuva
