= Mahmut Akan =

Turkish footballer (born 1994)

Personal information
- Date of birth: 14 July 1994 (age 32)
- Place of birth: Keçiören, Turkey
- Height: 1.81 m (5 ft 11 in)
- Position: Left-back

Youth career
- 2008–2010: Osmanlıspor
- 2010–2011: Ankaragücü
- 2011–2013: Osmanlıspor

Senior career*
Years	Team	Apps	(Gls)
2013–2016	Osmanlıspor	0	(0)
2013–2014	→ Bugsaşspor (loan)	14	(0)
2016–2017	Karabükspor	1	(0)
2017–2020	Ankaragücü	3	(0)
2020–2021	Ankaraspor	26	(0)
2021–2023	Ankaragücü	1	(0)
2021–2022	→ Menemenspor (loan)	7	(0)
2024–2026	Ankara Keçiörengücü	1	(0)
- * Club domestic league appearances and goals as of 2 May 2026

Mahmut Akan (born 14 July 1994) is a Turkish professional footballer who plays as a left-back.

== Professional career ==
Mahmut made his professional debut for Karabükspor in a 3–2 Süper Lig victory over Akhisar Belediyespor on 2 June 2017.
