= Leandrinho (footballer, born 1986) =

Brazilian footballer

Personal information
- Full name: Leandro Barrios Rita dos Martires
- Date of birth: June 6, 1986 (age 40)
- Place of birth: Cotia, Brazil
- Height: 1.78 m (5 ft 10 in)
- Position: Forward

Youth career
- Portuguesa Santista

Senior career*
Years	Team	Apps	(Gls)
2004–2005	Portuguesa Santista	32	(17)
2005–2006	Londrina	9	(4)
2006–2007	Herediano	45	(23)
2007–2008	Zulte Waregem	4	(0)
2008–2009	Herediano		
2009–2010	Paços de Ferreira	7	(0)
2010–2011	Alajuelense	36	(14)
2011–2012	Mes Kerman	6	(1)
2012	Al Raed	8	(1)
2012–2013	Municipal	33	(14)
2013–2014	Herediano	27	(6)
2014–2015	San Luis	18	(3)
2015–2016	Denizlispor	29	(17)
2016–2017	Sivasspor	36	(9)
2017–2018	Karabükspor	13	(2)
2018–2019	Ümraniyespor	29	(7)
2019–2020	Altay	21	(1)
2020–2021	Herediano	13	(2)
2022	Ponte Preta	1	(0)
- * Club domestic league appearances and goals as of 13 May 2022

Leandro Barrios Rita dos Martires known as Leandro Barrios or Leandrinho (born June 6, 1986) is a Brazilian professional footballer who plays as a forward.

== Career ==
Also known as Leandrinho, Barrios rejoined Herediano from Guatemalan side Municipal in summer 2013, after having played for the club in 2006 and 2008. He also played for Alajuelense in Costa Rica after signing for them in 2010. He moved to Mexican second division outfit San Luis in June 2014.

== Career statistics ==
Last Update 24 August 2011

Club performance			League		Cup		Continental		Total	
Season	Club	League	Apps	Goals	Apps	Goals	Apps	Goals	Apps	Goals
Iran			League		Hazfi Cup		Asia		Total	
2011–12	Mes Kerman	Pro League	1	1	0	0	-	-	1	1
Career total			1	1	0	0	0	0	1	1
