= Mehmet İncebacak =

Turkish footballer (born 1991)

Personal information
- Date of birth: 9 February 1991 (age 35)
- Place of birth: İzmir, Turkey
- Position: Midfielder

Team information
- Current team: Manisaspor

Senior career*
Years	Team	Apps	(Gls)
2009–2017	Bucaspor	152	(12)
2018	Bodrum BB	14	(0)
2018–2019	Kahramanmaraşspor	15	(0)
2019	Turgutluspor	9	(2)
2019	Çankaya FK	9	(0)
2020	Şile Yıldızspor	8	(0)
2020–	Manisaspor	1	(1)
- * Club domestic league appearances and goals as of 17:46, 4 October 2020 (UTC)

Mehmet İncebacak (born 9 February 1991) is a Turkish professional footballer who plays as a midfielder for Manisaspor.
