= Muğdat Çelik =

Turkish footballer

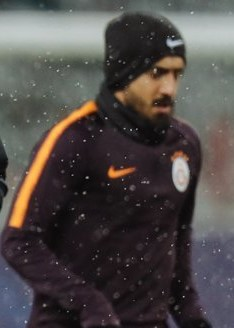

Personal information
- Date of birth: 3 January 1990 (age 36)
- Place of birth: Mersin, Turkey
- Height: 1.80 m (5 ft 11 in)
- Position: Forward

Team information
- Current team: Yeni Mersin İdmanyurdu
- Number: 8

Youth career
- 2004–2005: Kuvayi Milliyespor
- 2005–2008: Gençlerbirliği

Senior career*
Years	Team	Apps	(Gls)
2008–2011	Gençlerbirliği	0	(0)
2008–2009	→ Kastamonuspor (loan)	29	(3)
2009	→ Çankırıspor (loan)	18	(4)
2010	→ Bugsaşspor (loan)	13	(1)
2010	→ Batman Petrolspor (loan)	15	(1)
2011–2014	Nazilli Belediyespor	99	(49)
2014–2016	Balıkesirspor	55	(13)
2016–2018	Akhisarspor	53	(5)
2018–2019	Galatasaray	10	(2)
2019–2020	Gaziantep	5	(0)
2020–2021	Kayserispor	14	(1)
2021–2022	Denizlispor	9	(1)
2022–	Yeni Mersin İdmanyurdu	1	(0)
- * Club domestic league appearances and goals as of 15 October 2022

Muğdat Çelik (born 3 January 1990) is a Turkish footballer who plays for the TFF Third League club Yeni Mersin İdmanyurdu.

== Professional career ==
On 10 May 2018, Muğdat helped Akhisar Belediyespor win their first professional trophy, the 2017–18 Turkish Cup and assisted his team twice in the final.

On 12 July 2019, Çelik joined Gazişehir Gaziantep.

== Honours ==
Akhisarspor

- Turkish Cup (1): 2017-18

Galatasaray

- Süper Lig (1): 2018–19
- Turkish Cup (1): 2018–19
