= Gökçeören, Orta =

Village in Turkey

Gökçeören
- Village
- Location within Turkey Location within Turkey Central Anatolia
- Coordinates: 40°33′N 33°03′E
- Country: Turkey
- Province: Çankırı
- District: Orta
- Population (2021): 117
- Time zone: UTC+3 (TRT)

Gökçeören is a village in the Orta District, Çankırı Province, Turkey. Its population is 117 (2021).
