= Emre Akbaba =

Turkish footballer (born 1992)

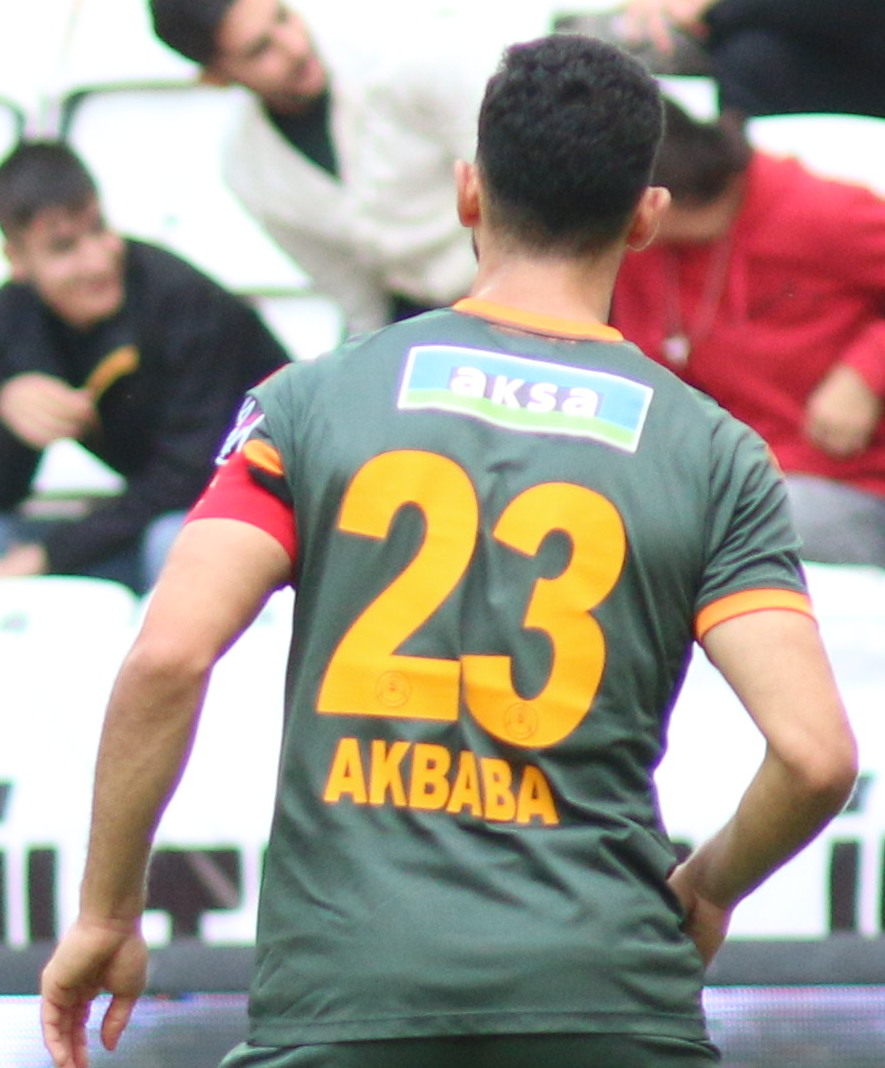
- Emre Akbaba with Alanyaspor in 2021

Personal information
- Date of birth: 4 October 1992 (age 34)
- Place of birth: Montfermeil, France
- Height: 1.80 m (5 ft 11 in)
- Position: Midfielder

Team information
- Current team: Fatih Karagümrük
- Number: 5

Youth career
- 2012–2013: Antalyaspor

Senior career*
Years	Team	Apps	(Gls)
2013	Kahramanmaraş BB	15	(1)
2013–2016	Antalyaspor	8	(0)
2013–2015	→ Alanyaspor (loan)	56	(25)
2016	→ Alanyaspor (loan)	14	(7)
2016–2018	Alanyaspor	66	(20)
2018–2022	Galatasaray	56	(10)
2021–2022	→ Alanyaspor (loan)	31	(10)
2022–2024	Adana Demirspor	59	(14)
2024–2026	Eyüpspor	59	(11)
2026–	Fatih Karagümrük	10	(2)

International career^{‡}
2015	Turkey A2	4	(0)
2017–2023	Turkey	7	(3)
- * Club domestic league appearances and goals as of 15 October 2026 ‡ National team caps and goals as of 1 September 2024

Emre Akbaba (born 4 October 1992) is a professional footballer who plays as a midfielder for the Turkish club Fatih Karagümrük in the TFF 1. Lig. Born in France, he represented the Turkey national team.

== Club career ==
=== Galatasaray ===
==== 2018–19 season ====
In the statement made by Galatasaray on 18 August 2018, an agreement was reached with Emre Akbaba and his club Alanyaspor on the transfer of the player. Accordingly, a transfer fee of 4,000,000 Euros will be paid to the former club of the football player. An agreement has been reached with the player himself for 3 seasons, starting with the 2018–19 football season. Accordingly, a net 1.750.000 Euro fixed transfer fee will be paid to the player for each football season.

==== 2019–20 season ====
On 11 May 2019, in the 32nd week of the Süper Lig, Galatasaray was the guest of Çaykur Rizespor, while the yellow-red team suffered a sad injury in the second half of the match.

Akbaba, who was substituted for Ryan Donk in the 61st minute, remained on the ground after Braian Samudio's intervention in the 67th minute. There was a great sadness in the field as the right foot of the football player was broken.

==== 2020–21 season ====
On 15 January 2020, Galatasaray Technical Director Fatih Terim took Akbaba, who returned to the field after 8 months, to the field as the captain in the Çaykur Rizespor match. The Turkish national player brought the score to 1–1 with the goal he scored in the 39th minute of the fight.

==== 2021–22 season ====
A new 2-year contract was signed between Akbaba and Galatasaray, whose contract expired on 4 July 2021.

=== Alanyaspor (loan) ===
On 4 July 2021, it was announced that an agreement was reached on the temporary transfer of Galatasaray Akbaba to Alanyaspor until the end of the 2021–22 season.

=== Adana Demirspor ===
He signed a 2+1 year contract with Adana Demirspor on 8 September 2022. It has been announced that a transfer fee of 500,000 Euros will be paid to the Galatasaray club for this transfer.

== International career ==
Emre was born in Montfermeil within a French family of Turkish descent. Emre made one appearance for the Turkey national football B team in a 2–2 (3–5) win over the Italy U21s.

== Career statistics ==
As of 28 April 2021

=== Club ===
Club	Season	League	League		Cup		Europe		Other		Total	
Club	Season	League	Apps	Goals	Apps	Goals	Apps	Goals	Apps	Goals	Apps	Goals
1920 Maraşspor	2012–13	TFF Third League	15	1	0	0	—		—		15	1
1920 Maraşspor	Total		15	1	0	0	0	0	0	0	15	1
Alanyaspor	2013–14	TFF Second League	37	15	2	0	—		—		39	15
Alanyaspor	2014–15	TFF First League	24	11	2	1	—		—		26	12
Alanyaspor	2015–16	TFF First League	17	8	0	0	—		—		17	8
Alanyaspor	2016–17	Süper Lig	33	6	1	0	—		—		34	6
Alanyaspor	2017–18	Süper Lig	32	14	2	0	—		—		34	14
Alanyaspor	2018–19	Süper Lig	1	0	0	0	—		—		1	0
Alanyaspor	Total		144	54	7	1	0	0	0	0	151	55
Antalyaspor	2015–16	Süper Lig	8	0	7	2	—		—		15	2
Antalyaspor	Total		8	0	7	2	0	0	0	0	15	2
Galatasaray	2018–19	Süper Lig	16	2	3	1	2	0	0	0	21	3
Galatasaray	2019–20	Süper Lig	17	4	2	2	0	0	0	0	19	6
Galatasaray	2020–21	Süper Lig	23	4	3	0	0	0	0	0	26	4
Galatasaray	Total		56	10	8	3	2	0	0	0	66	13
Career total			223	65	22	6	2	0	0	0	247	71

=== International ===
Turkey national team
Year	Apps	Goals
2017	1	1
2018	5	2
2019	0	0
2020	0	0
2021	0	0
Total	6	3

=== International goals ===
Scores and results list Turkey's goal tally first.

No	Date	Venue	Opponent	Score	Result	Competition
1.	13 November 2017	New Antalya Stadium, Antalya, Turkey	Albania	2–3	2–3	Friendly
2.	10 September 2018	Friends Arena, Solna, Sweden	Sweden	2–2	3–2	2018–19 UEFA Nations League B
3.	10 September 2018	Friends Arena, Solna, Sweden	Sweden	3–2	3–2	2018–19 UEFA Nations League B

== Honours ==
Galatasaray

- Süper Lig: 2018–19
- Turkish Cup: 2018–19
- Turkish Super Cup: 2019

== Personal life ==
Akbaba married Yasemin İnce in November 2016.
