= Orhan Aktaş =

German footballer (born 1994)

Personal information
- Date of birth: 21 October 1994 (age 32)
- Place of birth: Würselen, Germany
- Height: 1.75 m (5 ft 9 in)
- Position: Left-back

Team information
- Current team: İnegölspor
- Number: 20

Youth career
- Blau-Weiß Alsdorf
- –2010: Germania Dürwiß
- 2010–2013: Borussia M'gladbach
- 2013–2014: Denizlispor

Senior career*
Years	Team	Apps	(Gls)
2014–2015	Husqvarna FF	20	(0)
2015	Haskovo	10	(0)
2015–2018	İstanbulspor	65	(1)
2018–2019	Bodrumspor	42	(2)
2019	Giresunspor	0	(0)
2020	Manisa	2	(0)
2020–2021	Bodrumspor	25	(1)
2021–2022	Sarıyer	21	(1)
2022	Ankaraspor	12	(1)
2022–2025	İnegölspor	72	(1)
2025	Kepezspor	11	(0)
2025–	İnegölspor	13	(1)
- * Club domestic league appearances and goals as of 30 November 2025

Orhan Aktaş (born 21 October 1994) is a German professional footballer who plays as a left-back for Turkish TFF 2. Lig club İnegölspor. He is a product of the Borussia Mönchengladbach academy.

== Career ==
In 2010, Aktaş joined Borussia Mönchengladbach at the age of 15. In 2012–13 season, he earned 24 appearances for Borussia Mönchengladbach in the Under 19 Bundesliga and scored two goals.

On 19 July 2013, Aktaş signed a three-year contract with Denizlispor in Turkey.

In February 2015, after a successful trial period, Aktaş joined Bulgarian side Haskovo. He made his league debut in a 1–1 away draw against Levski Sofia on 20 March 2015.
