= Gökhan Karadeniz =

Turkish footballer

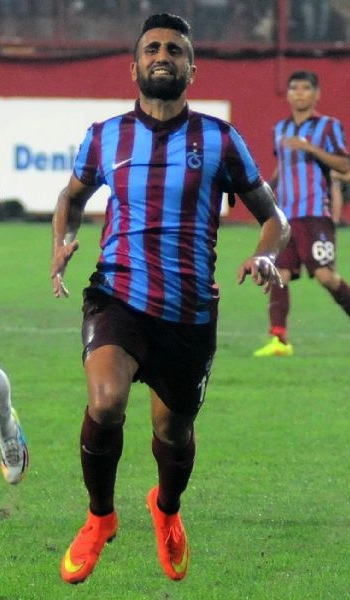

Personal information
- Date of birth: 2 May 1990 (age 36)
- Place of birth: Bursa, Turkey
- Height: 1.78 m (5 ft 10 in)
- Positions: Left winger; attacking midfielder

Team information
- Current team: Batman Petrolspor
- Number: 17

Youth career
- 2000–2009: Karacabeyspor
- 2009–2010: Gemlikspor

Senior career*
Years	Team	Apps	(Gls)
2010–2011	Hatayspor	9	(1)
2011–2013	Bursa Nilüferspor	52	(28)
2013	→ Aydınspor 1923 (loan)	14	(2)
2013–2014	Altınordu	35	(29)
2014–2015	Trabzonspor	1	(0)
2014–2015	→ Antalyaspor (loan)	31	(8)
2015–2017	Göztepe	37	(10)
2017	→ Bandırmaspor (loan)	14	(3)
2017–2018	BB Erzurumspor	34	(7)
2018–2021	Hatayspor	63	(13)
2021	Samsunspor	24	(3)
2022–2023	Boluspor	29	(5)
2023–2024	Çorum	41	(6)
2024–2026	Serik Belediyespor	42	(13)
2026	Aliağa FK	0	(0)
2026–	Batman Petrolspor	21	(4)

International career
2014	Turkey A2	1	(0)
- * Club domestic league appearances and goals as of 18 October 2026

Gökhan Karadeniz (born 2 May 1990) is a Turkish footballer who plays as a midfielder for TFF 1. Lig club Batman Petrolspor.

== Career ==
With Altınordu he became the top scorer of all Turkish leagues in the 2013–14 season with 27 goals in 33 matches.
