= İsmail Çipe =

Turkish association football player

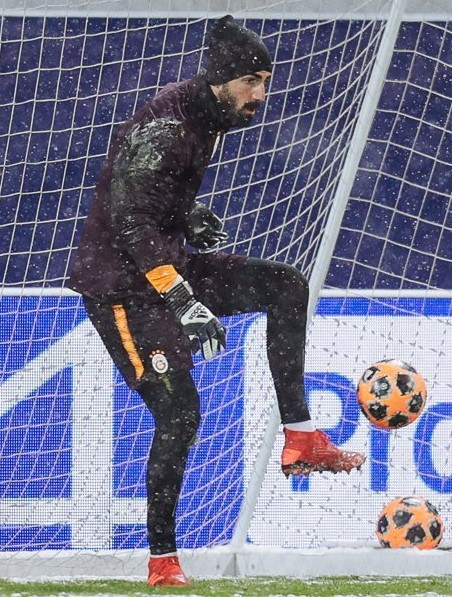

Personal information
- Date of birth: 5 January 1995 (age 31)
- Place of birth: Antakya, Hatay, Turkey
- Height: 1.97 m (6 ft 6 in)
- Position: Goalkeeper

Youth career
- 2008–2010: Hatayspor
- 2010–2016: Galatasaray

Senior career*
Years	Team	Apps	(Gls)
2016–2023	Galatasaray	9	(0)
2016–2017	→ Bugsaşspor (loan)	6	(0)
2017–2018	→ Karagümrük (loan)	12	(0)
2018	→ Tuzlaspor (loan)	13	(0)
2019–2021	→ Kayserispor (loan)	10	(0)
2023–2024	Boluspor	2	(0)
2024–2025	Sakaryaspor	7	(0)

International career^{‡}
2014	Turkey U19	1	(0)
2015	Turkey U21	1	(0)
- * Club domestic league appearances and goals as of 15 June 2025 ‡ National team caps and goals as of 18 June 2021

İsmail Çipe (born 5 January 1995) is a Turkish professional footballer who plays as a goalkeeper.

== Professional career ==
Çipe made his professional debut for Galatasaray in a 3–0 Süper Lig win over Kayserispor on 10 November 2018.
