= 2022–23 MKE Ankaragücü season =

MKE Ankaragücü
2022–23 season
- President: Faruk Koca
- Manager: Ömer Erdoğan (until 6 February 2023); Sedat Ağçay (from 20 February 2023 to 23 March 2023); Tolunay Kafkas (from 23 March 2023)
- Stadium: Eryaman Stadium
- Süper Lig: 11th
- Turkish Cup: Semi-finals
- Top goalscorer: League: Ali Sowe (12 goals); All: Ali Sowe (16 goals)
Home colours	Away colours	Third colours

The 2022–23 season was the 113th season in the existence of MKE Ankaragücü and the club's first season back in the top flight of Turkish football. In addition to the domestic league, MKE Ankaragücü participated in this season's edition of the Turkish Cup. The season covers the period from 1 July 2022 to 30 June 2023.

== Players ==
=== First-team squad ===
As of 8 September 2022

Note: Flags indicate national team as defined under FIFA eligibility rules; some limited exceptions apply. Players may hold more than one non-FIFA nationality.

No.	Pos.	Nation	Player
1	GK	TUR	Nurullah Aslan (on loan from Samsunspor)
2	DF	TUR	Mahmut Akan
3	DF	BRA	Marlon Xavier
4	DF	TUR	Atakan Çankaya
5	MF	TUR	Abdullah Durak
6	MF	GER	Şahverdi Çetin
7	MF	GRE	Anastasios Chatzigiovanis
8	MF	POR	Pedrinho
9	FW	SUI	Eren Derdiyok
10	FW	ESP	Jesé
11	FW	ITA	Federico Macheda
12	FW	USA	Gboly Ariyibi
14	MF	SEN	Lamine Diack
17	DF	TUR	Yasin Güreler
18	DF	BIH	Nihad Mujakić
19	MF	NOR	Ghayas Zahid

No.	Pos.	Nation	Player
20	DF	TUR	Alperen Babacan
21	MF	GEO	Giorgi Beridze
22	FW	GAM	Ali Sowe (on loan from Rostov)
23	MF	TUR	Ali Kaan Güneren
25	GK	TUR	Doğukan Kaya
26	DF	SRB	Uroš Radaković
28	MF	POR	Pêpê (on loan from Olympiacos)
30	MF	TUR	Tolga Ciğerci
77	DF	TUR	Oğuz Ceylan
80	FW	TUR	Sıtkı Ferdi İmdat
88	FW	TUR	Fıratcan Üzüm
90	DF	TUR	Sinan Osmanoğlu
98	GK	TUR	Kaan Çinkaya
99	GK	TUR	Bahadır Han Güngördü
—	GK	TUR	Gökhan Akkan (on loan from Çaykur Rizespor)
—	DF	FRA	Kévin Malcuit

== Pre-season and friendlies ==
Win Draw Loss Fixtures

20 July 2022 Friendly	Ankaragücü (Turkey)	3–0	(Turkey) Yeni Malatyaspor	Kayseri
17:00 TRT (UTC+3)	Sowe 45'; Macheda 64'; Derdiyok 89'	Report		Stadium: Erciyes Yüksek İrtifa Kamp Merkezi

10 December 2022 Friendly	Ankaragücü (Turkey)	0–2	(Turkey) Sivasspor	Antalya
12:30 TRT (UTC+3)			Yatabaré 31'; Saba 41'	Stadium: Titanic Hotel Spor Kompleks Field 1

13 December 2022 Friendly	Ankaragücü (Turkey)	0–1	(Turkey) Konyaspor	Belek
14:00 TRT (UTC+3)			Hadžiahmetović 84' (pen.)	Stadium: Cornelia Sportcomplex Pitch 1

== Competitions ==
=== Overall record ===
Competition	First match	Last match	Starting round	Final position	Record							
Competition	First match	Last match	Starting round	Final position	Pld	W	D	L	GF	GA	GD	Win %
Süper Lig	8 August 2022	7 June 2023	Matchday 1	11th	36	12	6	18	43	53	−10	33.33
Turkish Cup	8 November 2022	25 May 2023	Fourth round	Semi-finals	6	3	2	1	14	7	+7	50.00
Total					42	15	8	19	57	60	−3	35.71

Source: Soccerway

=== Süper Lig ===
==== League table ====
Pos	Team	Pld	W	D	L	GF	GA	GD	Pts
9	Kayserispor	36	15	5	16	55	61	−6	47 (Note: Reduction of 3 points by decision of the Turkish Federation.)
10	Kasımpaşa	36	12	7	17	45	61	−16	43
11	Ankaragücü	36	12	6	18	43	53	−10	42
12	İstanbulspor	36	12	5	19	47	63	−16	41 (Note: Head-to-head points: İstanbulspor 11, Antalyaspor 10, Sivasspor 8, Alanyaspor 4.)
13	Antalyaspor	36	11	8	17	46	55	−9	41

Source: Süper Lig
Rules for classification: 1) Points; 2) Head-to-head points; 3) Head-to-head goal difference; 4) Head-to-head goals scored; 5) Goal difference; 6) Goals scored; 7) Play-off.

==== Results summary ====
Overall								Home						Away					
Pld	W	D	L	GF	GA	GD	Pts	W	D	L	GF	GA	GD	W	D	L	GF	GA	GD
36	12	6	18	43	53	−10	42	6	4	8	24	28	−4	6	2	10	19	25	−6

Source: Spor Toto Süper Lig

==== Results by round ====
Round	1	2	3	4	5	6	7	8	9	10	11	12	13	14	15	16	17	18	19	20	21	22	23	24	25	26	27	28	29	30	31	32	33	34	35	36	37	38
Ground	H	A		A	H	A	H	H	A	H	A	H	A	H	A	H	A	H	A	A	H		H	A	H	A	A	H	A	H	A	H	A	H	A	H	A	H
Result	D	L	B	L	L	L	W	L	W	L	D	W	D	D	W	L	L	W	L	W	L	B	L	L	W	L	L	W	L	W	W	D	L	D	W	L	W	L
Position	12	14	14	18	19	19	16	16	14	17	17	14	14	16	12	14	15	12	13	11	13	12	15	16	13	15	15	14	14	14	12	13	13	14	12	13	11	11

Source: Spor Toto Süper Lig
A = Away; H = Home; B = Bye; W = Win; D = Draw; L = Loss

==== Matches ====
The league schedule was released on 4 July.

8 August 2022 1	Ankaragücü	0–0	Konyaspor	Ankara
21:45 TRT (UTC+3)	Ceylan (yellow card) 90+4'	Report		Stadium: Eryaman Stadium; Attendance: 12,977; Referee: Bahattin Şimşek

14 August 2022 2	Gaziantep	1–0	Ankaragücü	Gaziantep
19:15 TRT (UTC+3)	Kitsiou (yellow card) 30'; Ersoy (yellow card) 45' (goal) 47'	Report	Çankaya (yellow card) 28'; Chatzigiovanis (yellow card) 35'; Diack (yellow card) 79'	Stadium: Gaziantep Stadium; Attendance: 1,484; Referee: Mustafa Kürşad Filiz

3	Bye

27 August 2022 4	Fatih Karagümrük	4–1	Ankaragücü	Istanbul
19:15 TRT (UTC+3)	Dursun 2'; Borini 9', 48'; Diagne 83' (pen.); Musa (yellow card) 90+2'	Report	Pêpê (yellow card) 45+6'; Rayyan Baniya 53' (o.g.); Ceylan (yellow card) 61'; Osmanoğlu (yellow card) 82'; Shukurov (yellow card) 90+3'	Stadium: Atatürk Olympic Stadium; Attendance: 917; Referee: Çağdaş Altay

4 September 2022 5	Ankaragücü	2–3	Beşiktaş	Ankara
21:45 TRT (UTC+3)	Beridze 26', 47'; Macheda (yellow card) 61'; Marlon (yellow card) 82' (yellow card) 90+4' (red card); Güngördü (yellow card) 90+6'	Report	Muleka 30'; Alli 35'; N'Koudou 74' (pen.); Rosier (yellow card) 90+6'; Souza (red card) 90+10'	Stadium: Eryaman Stadium; Attendance: 17,265; Referee: Mete Kalkavan

9 September 2022 6	Alanyaspor	2–1	Ankaragücü	Antalya
20:00 TRT (UTC+3)	Doumbia (yellow card) 49'; Karaca (yellow card) 53'; Hassan 65'; Bekiroğlu 87'	Report	Güreler 69'	Stadium: Kırbıyık Holding Stadium; Attendance: 3,598; Referee: Mert Güzenge

18 September 2022 7	Ankaragücü	2–1	Sivasspor	Ankara
20:00 TRT (UTC+3)	Beridze 2'; Pedrinho (yellow card) 40'; Sowe 44'; Marlon (yellow card) 82'; Malcuit (yellow card) 90'	Report	Goutas (yellow card) 10'; Charisis (yellow card) 45+7'; N'Jie 48'; Çiftçi (yellow card) 64'; Ulvestad (yellow card) 90+5'	Stadium: Eryaman Stadium; Attendance: 298; Referee: Sarper Barış Saka

1 October 2022 8	Ankaragücü	1–2	İstanbul Başakşehir	Ankara
17:00 TRT (UTC+3)	Ciğerci 55' (pen.) (yellow card) 57'	Report	Okaka 3'; Şahiner (yellow card) 28'; Kény (yellow card) 78'; Türüç 81'	Stadium: Eryaman Stadium; Attendance: 10,400; Referee: Arda Kardeşler

8 October 2022 9	İstanbulspor	1–2	Ankaragücü	Istanbul
14:30 TRT (UTC+3)	Sarıkaya (yellow card) 14'; Ethemi (yellow card) 29' (goal) 55'	Report	Kılınç 16'; Pêpê (yellow card) 80'; Güreler (yellow card) 87'; Sowe 90+2'	Stadium: Necmi Kadıoğlu Stadium; Attendance: 444; Referee: Yasin Kol

17 October 2022 10	Ankaragücü	0–3	Fenerbahçe	Ankara
20:00 TRT (UTC+3)	Malcuit (yellow card) 45+1'; Güreler (yellow card) 47'	Report	Batshuayi 3'; Kahveci 25'; Osayi-Samuel (yellow card) 57'; Rossi 90+1'	Stadium: Eryaman Stadium; Attendance: 17,450; Referee: Halil Umut Meler

24 October 2022 11	Giresunspor	1–1	Ankaragücü	Giresun
20:00 TRT (UTC+3)	Akpınar (yellow card) 66'; Uludağ (yellow card) 75'; Bajić 85'; Campuzano (yellow card) 90'	Report	Ceylan (yellow card) 38'; Ciğerci (yellow card) 57'; Jesé 69' (pen.) (yellow card) 71'; Antalyalı (yellow card) 75'; Kılınç (yellow card) 90'; Akkan (yellow card) 90+2'	Stadium: Çotanak Sports Complex; Attendance: 4,382; Referee: Suat Arslanboğa

30 October 2022 12	Ankaragücü	4–1	Hatayspor	Ankara
14:30 TRT (UTC+3)	Beridze 3'; Mujakić (yellow card) 58'; Antalyalı 61'; Sowe 69'; Ciğerci (yellow card) 89'; Diack 90+2'	Report	El Kaabi 86' (pen.) (yellow card) 89'	Stadium: Eryaman Stadium; Attendance: 10,327; Referee: Yaşar Kemal Uğurlu

4 November 2022 13	Kasımpaşa	1–1	Ankaragücü	Istanbul
20:00 TRT (UTC+3)	Koita 58' (yellow card) 90+7'	Report	Chatzigiovanis 85' (yellow card) 85'; Malcuit (yellow card) 90+2'	Stadium: Recep Tayyip Erdoğan Stadium; Attendance: 2,222; Referee: Ümit Öztürk

11 November 2022 14	Ankaragücü	1–1	Trabzonspor	Ankara
20:00 TRT (UTC+3)	Güreler (yellow card) 26'; Ciğerci 74' (pen.); Mujakić (yellow card) 90+7'	Report	Hugo (yellow card) 14'; Bardhi 70'; Bozok (yellow card) 90+7'	Stadium: Eryaman Stadium; Attendance: 17,383; Referee: Mete Kalkavan

23 December 2022 15	Antalyaspor	0–2	Ankaragücü	Antalya
20:00 TRT (UTC+3)	Adriano (yellow card) 73'; Fernando (yellow card) 81'	Report	Radaković (yellow card) 45+3'; Jesé 64'; Güngördü (yellow card) 87'; Sowe 90+11'	Stadium: Antalya Stadium; Attendance: 4,663; Referee: Ali Şansalan

27 December 2022 16	Ankaragücü	1–2	Ümraniyespor	Ankara
17:00 TRT (UTC+3)	Zahid 2'; Ciğerci (yellow card) 65'	Report	Avounou 9', 55'; Glumac (yellow card) 19'; Göksu (yellow card) 45+2'; Geraldo (yellow card) 52'; Sackey (yellow card) 57'	Stadium: Eryaman Stadium; Attendance: 5,886; Referee: Mustafa Kürşad Filiz

4 January 2023 17	Galatasaray	2–1	Ankaragücü	Istanbul
20:00 TRT (UTC+3)	Yılmaz 16' (yellow card) 72'; Gomis 30'; Midtsjø (yellow card) 71'	Report	Antalyalı 7'; Zahid (yellow card) 50'; Diack (yellow card) 77'; Güreler (yellow card) 90+6'	Stadium: Nef Stadium; Attendance: 41,917; Referee: Zorbay Küçük

8 January 2023 18	Ankaragücü	2–1	Kayserispor	Ankara
16:00 TRT (UTC+3)	Diack (yellow card) 23'; Sowe 38'; Kılınç 63'; Mujakić (yellow card) 45+2'; Ciğerci (yellow card) 72'	Report	Cardoso 15'; Pektemek (yellow card) 90+5'	Stadium: Eryaman Stadium; Attendance: 9,664; Referee: Ümit Öztürk

14 January 2023 19	Adana Demirspor	3–1	Ankaragücü	Adana
16:00 TRT (UTC+3)	Güler (yellow card) 33'; Sarı 49'; Stambouli (yellow card) 57'; Akbaba 66'; Inler 78'	Report	Radaković 61'; Diack (yellow card) 65'	Stadium: New Adana Stadium; Attendance: 18,917; Referee: Burak Şeker

23 January 2023 20	Konyaspor	0–1	Ankaragücü	Konya
20:00 TRT (UTC+3)	Demirbağ (yellow card) 45+2'; Oğuz (yellow card) 73'; Ülgün (yellow card) 89'	Report	Çankaya (yellow card) 45+2'; Zahid 51'; Akkan (yellow card) 89'	Stadium: Konya Metropolitan Municipality Stadium; Attendance: 10,819; Referee: Murat Erdoğan

28 January 2023 21	Ankaragücü	0–2	Gaziantep	Ankara
16:00 TRT (UTC+3)	Üzüm (yellow card) 89'	Report	Pehlivan (yellow card) 33'; Kitsiou (yellow card) 36'; Djilobodji 47'; Ersoy (yellow card) 89'; Veliu (yellow card) 90+2'; Figueiredo 90+7'	Stadium: Eryaman Stadium; Attendance: 11.854; Referee: Mert Güzenge

22	Bye

4 February 2023 23	Ankaragücü	0–2	Fatih Karagümrük	Ankara
13:30 TRT (UTC+3)	Pedrinho (penalty missed) 31'	Report	Diagne 45+1'; Borini 64' (pen.); Bertolacci (yellow card) 74'	Stadium: Eryaman Stadium; Referee: Arda Kardeşler

5 March 2023 24	Beşiktaş	2–1	Ankaragücü	Istanbul
19:00 TRT (UTC+3)	Uçan 40'; Aboubakar 55'; Masuaku (yellow card) 85'; Fernandes (yellow card) 88'; Welinton (yellow card) 90+6'	Report	Sowe 53'; Mujakić (yellow card) 59'	Stadium: Vodafone Park; Referee: Volkan Bayarslan

12 March 2023 25	Ankaragücü	2–0	Alanyaspor	Ankara
13:30 TRT (UTC+3)	Milson (yellow card) 8', (goal) 76'; Sowe 18'; Kılınç (yellow card) 40'	Report	Özdemir (yellow card) 1'; Hassan (yellow card) 42'	Stadium: Eryaman Stadium; Referee: Ali Şansalan

19 March 2023 26	Sivasspor	2–0	Ankaragücü	Sivas
16:00 TRT (UTC+3)	Cofie 23'; Sáiz 77' (pen.)	Report		Stadium: New Sivas 4 Eylül Stadium; Referee: Suat Arslanboğa

1 April 2023 27	İstanbul Başakşehir	1–0	Ankaragücü	Istanbul
16:00 TRT (UTC+3)	Gürler 36'; Danijel Aleksić (yellow card) 44'; Figueiredo (yellow card) 47'; Touba (yellow card) 69'	Report	Kılınç (yellow card) 40'; Sowe 44'; Diack (penalty missed) 58'	Stadium: Fatih Terim Stadium; Referee: Abdulkadir Bitigen

8 April 2023 28	Ankaragücü	3–2	İstanbulspor	Ankara
16:00 TRT (UTC+3)	Sowe 10', 53'; Diack 24'; Antalyalı (yellow card) 84'	Report	Ethemi (yellow card) 28'; Şen 47'; Sarıkaya (yellow card) 51'; Lokilo 55'; Yeşil (yellow card) 74'; Ba (yellow card) 77'	Stadium: Eryaman Stadium; Referee: Mustafa Kürşad Filiz

15 April 2023 29	Fenerbahçe	2–1	Ankaragücü	Istanbul
20:30 TRT (UTC+3)	Yüksek (yellow card) 45+1'; Valencia 87' (pen.); Crespo 90+6'; Osayi-Samuel (yellow card) 90+10'	Report	Diack (yellow card) 72'; Đokanović (yellow card) 74'; Sowe 80'; Hanousek (yellow card) 84'; Çankaya (yellow card) 85'; Kitsiou (yellow card) 86'; Mujakić (yellow card) 90+8'; Milson (yellow card) 90+11'	Stadium: Şükrü Saracoğlu Stadium; Referee: Atilla Karaoğlan

20 April 2023 30	Ankaragücü	3–1	Giresunspor	Ankara
17:00 TRT (UTC+3)	Sowe 54', 90+7'; Antalyalı 74'; Hanousek (yellow card) 82'	Report	Diack 44' (o.g.); Kaplan (yellow card) 45+5'; Arias (yellow card) 56'	Stadium: Eryaman Stadium; Referee: Halil Umut Meler

31	Hatayspor	0–3 (w/o)	Ankaragücü	Hatay
		Report		Stadium: New Hatay Stadium
Note: Hatayspor withdrew from the league due to the 2023 Turkey–Syria earthquake and Ankaragücü, therefore, were awarded a 3–0 win.

30 April 2023 32	Ankaragücü	0–0	Kasımpaşa	Ankara
16:00 TRT (UTC+3)	Malcuit (yellow card) 69'	Report	Hadergjonaj (yellow card) 19'; Kara (yellow card) 65'	Stadium: Eryaman Stadium; Referee: Bahattin Şimşek

8 May 2023 33	Trabzonspor	2–0	Ankaragücü	Trabzon
20:00 TRT (UTC+3)	Haspolat (yellow card) 9'; Bozok 45+1', 62'	Report	Kitsiou (red card) 10'; Antalyalı (yellow card) 48'	Stadium: Şenol Güneş Sports Complex; Referee: Erkan Özdamar

17 May 2023 34	Ankaragücü	1–1	Antalyaspor	Ankara
20:00 TRT (UTC+3)	Kılınç (yellow card) 71'; Milson 90+3'	Report	Sinik (yellow card) 44'; Vural (yellow card) 64', (goal) 68'; Rakip (yellow card) 82'	Stadium: Eryaman Stadium; Referee: Ümit Öztürk

21 May 2023 35	Ümraniyespor	1–2	Ankaragücü	Istanbul
16:00 TRT (UTC+3)	Glumac (yellow card) 8'; Nayir 26' (pen.); Gürbulak (yellow card) 76'	Report	Kitsiou (yellow card) 7'; Malcuit 18'; Kızıldağ (yellow card) 20'; Milson 71'	Stadium: Ümraniye Municipality City Stadium; Referee: Mete Kalkavan

30 May 2023 36	Ankaragücü	1–4	Galatasaray	Ankara
20:00 TRT (UTC+3)	Milson 16'; Kızıldağ (yellow card) 24'; Diack (yellow card) 34'; Mujakić (yellow card) 54'	Report	Icardi 7', 39'; Yılmaz 73'; Oliveira 77'	Stadium: Eryaman Stadium; Referee: Volkan Bayarslan

3 June 2023 37	Kayserispor	0–1	Ankaragücü	Kayseri
19:00 TRT (UTC+3)		Report	Çankaya (yellow card) 12'; Kitsiou 24'	Stadium: Kadir Has Stadium; Referee: Cihan Aydın

7 June 2023 38	Ankaragücü	1–2	Adana Demirspor	Ankara
20:00 TRT (UTC+3)	Milson 83'	Report	Belhanda 31'; Akbaba 57'	Stadium: Eryaman Stadium; Referee: Çağdaş Altay

=== Turkish Cup ===
8 November 2022 Fourth round	Ankaragücü	6–2	Amed	Ankara
17:00 TRT (UTC+3)	Jesé 7', 47'; Osmanoğlu 9'; Zahid 28', 74'; Chatzigiovanis 46'	Report	Osmanoğlu 85' (o.g.); Coşkun (yellow card) 88'; Gümüş 89'	Stadium: Eryaman Stadium; Referee: Kutluhan Bilgiç

20 December 2022 Fifth round	Ankaragücü	2–0	Tuzlaspor	Ankara
13:00 TRT (UTC+3)	Jesé 7'; Çankaya (yellow card) 17'; Ceylan (yellow card) 43'; Macheda 55'	Report	Adeniyi (yellow card) 43'; Rotman (yellow card) 59'	Stadium: Eryaman Stadium; Referee: Suat Arslanboğa

18 January 2023 Round of 16	Ankaragücü	1–1 (a.e.t.) (4–3 p)	Beşiktaş	Ankara
17:45 TRT (UTC+3)	Sowe 12'; Marlon (yellow card) 40'	Report	Muleka (yellow card) 61'; Tosun 77'	Stadium: Eryaman Stadium; Referee: Sarper Barış Saka
	Penalties
	Ciğerci (penalty scored); Sowe (penalty scored); Marlon (penalty scored); Pedrinho (penalty scored)		(penalty scored) Saïss; (penalty missed) Hutchinson; (penalty scored) Kesgin; (penalty scored) Redmond; (penalty missed) Masuaku

4 April 2023 Quarter-finals	Ankaragücü	3–1	Trabzonspor	Ankara
20:30 TRT (UTC+3)	Hanousek (yellow card) 35'; Sowe 51', 83'; Diack 69'; Kızıldağ (yellow card) 89'	Report	Ömür (yellow card) 3' (goal) 22'; Peres (yellow card) 39'; Denswil (yellow card) 77'; Çakır (yellow card) 89'; Bakasetas (yellow card) 89'	Stadium: Eryaman Stadium; Referee: Zorbay Küçük

4 May 2023 Semi-finals first leg	İstanbul Başakşehir	1–0	Ankaragücü	Istanbul
20:30 TRT (UTC+3)	Aleksić (yellow card) 4'; Touba (red card) 43'; Biglia (yellow card) 55'; Erkin (yellow card) 72'; Şengezer (yellow card) 78'; Figueiredo 90+5'	Report	(yellow card) 90+7' Malcuit	Stadium: Fatih Terim Stadium; Referee: Zorbay Küçük

25 May 2023 Semi-finals second leg	Ankaragücü	2–2 (a.e.t.) (2–3 agg.)	İstanbul Başakşehir	Ankara
20:30 TRT (UTC+3)	Sowe 11'; Diack (yellow card) 42'; Malcuit (yellow card) 63'; Chatzigiovanis 90'; Đokanović (yellow card) 90+2'; Mujakić (yellow card) 97' (yellow-red card) 97'; Kılınç (yellow card) 120+3'	Report	Şahiner (yellow card) 38'; Türüç (yellow card) 46'; Gürler 61'; Kény 111'; Şengezer (yellow card) 115'	Stadium: Eryaman Stadium; Referee: Ali Şansalan
