= List of Turkish football transfers summer 2022 =

This is a list of Turkish football transfers in the 2022 summer transfer window by club. Only clubs in the 2022–23 Süper Lig are included.

== Süper Lig ==
=== Adana Demirspor ===
In:

No.	Pos.	Nation	Player
3	DF	TUR	Abdurrahim Dursun (from Trabzonspor)
7	MF	NGA	Henry Onyekuru (on loan from (Greece) Olympiacos)
15	DF	MKD	Jovan Manev (on loan from (North Macedonia) Bregalnica Štip)
17	MF	SEN	Badou Ndiaye (from (Greece) Aris)
18	GK	BIH	Goran Karačić (from Adanaspor)
20	MF	TUR	Emre Akbaba (from Galatasaray, previously on loan at Alanyaspor)
21	MF	ALB	Arda Okan Kurtulan (from Fenerbahçe)
23	FW	NOR	Fredrik Gulbrandsen (from İstanbul Başakşehir)
24	FW	RUS	Artem Dzyuba (from (Russia) Zenit)
25	GK	TUR	Ertaç Özbir (from Yeni Malatyaspor)
26	MF	TUR	Yusuf Sari (from Çaykur Rizespor)
44	DF	UKR	Yaroslav Rakitskyi (from (Russia) Zenit)
70	MF	TUR	Berk Yıldız (from Yeni Malatyaspor)
77	DF	POR	Kévin Rodrigues (from (Spain) Real Sociedad)
—	MF	SYR	Aias Aosman (from (Greece) Ionikos)
—	FW	TUR	Ali Yavuz Kol (from Galatasaray)

Out:

No.	Pos.	Nation	Player
9	FW	ITA	Mario Balotelli (to (Switzerland) Sion)
59	FW	FRA	Loïc Rémy (released)
—	DF	TUR	Tayyip Talha Sanuç (to Beşiktaş)
—	MF	SYR	Aias Aosman (to (Greece) Ionikos)
—	MF	SEN	Joher Rassoul (to Eyüpspor, later loaned to Alanyaspor)
—	MF	TUR	Sedat Şahintürk (on loan to Bandırmaspor)

=== Alanyaspor ===
In:

No.	Pos.	Nation	Player
9	FW	TUR	Erencan Yardımcı (on loan from Eyüpspor)
10	MF	ALG	Zinedine Ferhat (from (France) Nîmes)
13	GK	ISL	Rúnar Alex Rúnarsson (on loan from (England) Arsenal)
18	MF	MAR	Oussama Targhalline (on loan from (France) Marseille)
19	FW	POR	Ivan Cavaleiro (on loan from (England) Fulham)
22	MF	TUR	Cem Çelik (from Menemenspor)
23	MF	SEN	Joher Rassoul (on loan from Eyüpspor)
27	DF	POR	Pedro Pereira (on loan from (Italy) Monza)
29	DF	SVN	Jure Balkovec (from Fatih Karagümrük)
37	MF	GER	Mert-Yusuf Torlak (from (Germany) Greuther Fürth)
42	DF	BEL	Yunus Bahadır (from (Netherlands) Jong PSV)
93	FW	EGY	Ahmed Hassan (on loan from (Greece) Olympiacos)
97	MF	COD	Arnaud Lusamba (from (France) Amiens)
98	MF	CIV	Idrissa Doumbia (on loan from (Portugal) Sporting CP)

Out:

No.	Pos.	Nation	Player
1	GK	TUR	Serkan Kırıntılı (to Ümraniyespor)
16	MF	TUR	Emirhan Aydoğan (to Sakaryaspor)
19	DF	SRB	Nemanja Milunović (to (Serbia) Red Star Belgrade)
23	MF	TUR	Emre Akbaba (loan return to Galatasaray, later sold to Adana Demirspor)
24	DF	ESP	Juanfran (to (Spain) Málaga)
25	DF	SVN	Miha Mevlja (to (Russia) Spartak Moscow)
75	DF	TUR	Tayfur Bingöl (on loan to Beşiktaş)

=== Ankaragücü ===
In:

No.	Pos.	Nation	Player
1	GK	TUR	Nurullah Aslan (on loan from Samsunspor)
3	DF	BRA	Marlon Xavier (from (Brazil) Fluminense)
7	MF	GRE	Anastasios Chatzigiovanis (from (Greece) Panathinaikos)
8	MF	POR	Pedrinho (from (Portugal) Gil Vicente)
10	FW	ESP	Jesé (from (Spain) Las Palmas)
11	FW	ITA	Federico Macheda (from (Greece) Panathinaikos)
14	MF	SEN	Lamine Diack (from Fenerbahçe)
18	DF	BIH	Nihad Mujakić (from (Bosnia and Herzegovina) Sarajevo)
21	MF	GEO	Giorgi Beridze (from (Hungary) Újpest)
22	FW	GAM	Ali Sowe (on loan from (Russia) Rostov)
24	DF	FRA	Kévin Malcuit (from (Italy) Napoli)
25	GK	TUR	Doğukan Kaya (from Kocaelispor)
26	DF	SRB	Uroš Radaković (from (Russia) Arsenal Tula)
28	FW	POR	Pêpê (on loan from (Greece) Olympiacos)
30	MF	TUR	Tolga Ciğerci (from İstanbul Başakşehir)
32	GK	TUR	Gökhan Akkan (on loan from Çaykur Rizespor)
48	MF	TUR	Taylan Antalyalı (on loan from Galatasaray)
54	MF	TUR	Emre Kılınç (on loan from Galatasaray)
77	DF	TUR	Oğuz Ceylan (from Gaziantep)
80	FW	TUR	Sıtkı Ferdi İmdat (loan return from Iğdır)
88	MF	TUR	Fıratcan Üzüm (from Adanaspor)
—	FW	TUR	Mervan Yusuf Yiğit (from Kocaelispor)

Out:

No.	Pos.	Nation	Player
23	MF	TUR	Ali Kaan Güneren (on loan to Samsunspor)

=== Antalyaspor ===
In:

No.	Pos.	Nation	Player
1	GK	TUR	Alperen Uysal (from İstanbulspor)
3	DF	TUR	Cemali Sertel (on loan from İstanbul Başakşehir)
5	MF	TUR	Soner Aydoğdu (from İstanbul Başakşehir)
9	FW	USA	Haji Wright (from (Denmark) SønderjyskE, previously on loan)
18	FW	SEN	Alassane Ndao (on loan from (Saudi Arabia) Al Ahli)
20	MF	SWE	Sam Larsson (from (China) Dalian Professional)
21	DF	TUR	Ömer Toprak (from (Germany) Werder Bremen)
22	FW	JPN	Shoya Nakajima (from (Portugal) Porto)
28	DF	COD	Christian Luyindama (on loan from Galatasaray)

Out:

No.	Pos.	Nation	Player
4	DF	BRA	Naldo (to (Saudi Arabia) Al Taawoun)
5	DF	TUR	Bahadır Öztürk (on loan to Çaykur Rizespor)
7	MF	TUR	Doğukan Sinik (to (England) Hull City)
10	MF	BIH	Deni Milošević (on loan to Sakaryaspor)
15	MF	ITA	Andrea Poli (to (Italy) Modena)
22	MF	TUR	Harun Alpsoy (to Bodrumspor)
99	GK	POR	Diogo Sousa (on loan to Bodrumspor)
—	DF	TUR	Cengiz Demir (to Hatayspor, previously on loan at Akhisarspor)
—	DF	TUR	Mert Yılmaz (on loan to Ümraniyespor)
—	FW	ARG	Gustavo Blanco Leschuk (to (Spain) Eibar, previously on loan)

=== Beşiktaş ===
In:

No.	Pos.	Nation	Player
3	DF	TUR	Tayyip Talha Sanuç (from Adana Demirspor)
9	FW	TUR	Cenk Tosun (from (England) Everton)
10	FW	NED	Wout Weghorst (on loan from (England) Burnley)
11	MF	ENG	Dele Alli (on loan from (England) Everton)
14	DF	TUR	Emrecan Uzunhan (from İstanbulspor)
15	MF	ENG	Nathan Redmond (from (England) Southampton)
17	MF	TUR	Kerem Atakan Kesgin (from Sivasspor)
25	DF	COD	Arthur Masuaku (on loan from (England) West Ham United)
26	DF	MAR	Romain Saïss (from (England) Wolverhampton Wanderers)
40	FW	COD	Jackson Muleka (from (Belgium) Standard Liège, previously on loan at Kasımpaşa)
88	DF	TUR	Tayfur Bingöl (on loan from Alanyaspor)

Out:

No.	Pos.	Nation	Player
3	DF	TUR	Rıdvan Yılmaz (to (Scotland) Rangers)
9	FW	BEL	Michy Batshuayi (loan return to (England) Chelsea, later sold to Fenerbahçe)
17	FW	CAN	Cyle Larin (to (Belgium) Club Brugge)
19	MF	BIH	Ajdin Hasić (on loan to Göztepe, previously on loan at Ümraniyespor)
21	MF	COD	Fabrice Nsakala (released)
22	MF	SRB	Adem Ljajić (released)
24	DF	CRO	Domagoj Vida (to (Greece) AEK Athens)
28	FW	TUR	Kenan Karaman (to (Germany) Schalke 04)
37	DF	TUR	Kerem Kalafat (on loan to Çaykur Rizespor)
46	DF	TUR	Serdar Saatçı (to (Portugal) Braga)
65	MF	TUR	Emirhan İlkhan (to (Italy) Torino)
90	MF	BRA	Alex Teixeira (to (Brazil) Vasco da Gama)
—	DF	BRA	Douglas (released)
—	MF	TUR	Emirhan Delibaş (on loan to Göztepe)
—	MF	TUR	Kartal Yılmaz (on loan to Ümraniyespor)

=== Fatih Karagümrük ===
In:

No.	Pos.	Nation	Player
1	GK	TUR	Batuhan Şen (on loan from Galatasaray)
3	DF	TUR	Emir Tintiş (from Galatasaray U21)
4	DF	ITA	Davide Biraschi (on loan from (Italy) Genoa)
5	DF	KOS	Ibrahim Drešević (from (Netherlands) Heerenveen)
8	MF	ITA	Matteo Ricci (on loan from (Italy) Frosinone)
9	FW	SEN	Mbaye Diagne (from Galatasaray)
13	FW	TUR	Colin Kazim-Richards (from (England) Derby County)
18	MF	GER	Levent Mercan (from (Germany) Schalke 04, previously on loan)
19	MF	GAM	Ebrima Colley (on loan from (Italy) Atalanta)
22	FW	TUR	Burak Kapacak (on loan from Fenerbahçe)
24	MF	NGA	Lawrence Nicholas (from (Russia) Khimki)
27	MF	RUS	Magomed Ozdoyev (from (Russia) Zenit)
29	MF	UZB	Otabek Shukurov (from (United Arab Emirates) Sharjah)
44	DF	SLE	Steven Caulker (from Fenerbahçe, previously on loan at Gaziantep)
54	DF	TUR	Salih Dursun (from Gençlerbirliği)
70	FW	CIV	Jean Evrard Kouassi (on loan from Trabzonspor)
77	MF	BEL	Adnan Ugur (from (Netherlands) Fortuna Sittard, previously on loan)

Out:

No.	Pos.	Nation	Player
—	DF	SVN	Jure Balkovec (to Alanyaspor)
—	DF	NED	Derrick Luckassen (loan return to (Netherlands) PSV, later sold to (Israel) Maccabi Tel Aviv)
—	DF	TUR	Ravil Tagir (on loan to (Belgium) Westerlo)
—	DF	BIH	Ervin Zukanović (to (Greece) Asteras Tripolis)
—	MF	GEO	Vato Arveladze (to (Azerbaijan) Neftçi)
—	MF	FRA	Yannis Salibur (released)
—	FW	TUR	Emre Mor (loan return to (Spain) Celta Vigo, later sold to Fenerbahçe)

=== Fenerbahçe ===
In:

No.	Pos.	Nation	Player
2	DF	BRA	Gustavo Henrique (on loan from (Brazil) Flamengo)
5	MF	BRA	Willian Arão (from (Brazil) Flamengo)
6	DF	MKD	Ezgjan Alioski (on loan from (Saudi Arabia) Al Ahli)
9	FW	URU	Diego Rossi (form (United States) Los Angeles FC, previously on loan)
15	FW	NOR	Joshua King (from (England) Watford)
18	MF	BRA	Lincoln (from (Portugal) Santa Clara)
20	MF	ITA	João Pedro (from (Italy) Cagliari)
22	FW	POR	Bruma (on loan from (Netherlands) PSV)
23	FW	BEL	Michy Batshuayi (from (England) Chelsea, previously on loan at Beşiktaş)
28	DF	BRA	Luan Peres (from (France) Marseille)
58	FW	TUR	Tiago Cukur (from (England) Watford)
70	GK	TUR	İrfan Can Eğribayat (on loan from Göztepe)
99	FW	TUR	Emre Mor (from (Spain) Celta Vigo, previously on loan at Fatih Karagümrük)
—	MF	SEN	Lamine Diack (from Tuzlaspor)

Out:

No.	Pos.	Nation	Player
3	DF	KOR	Kim Min-jae (to (Italy) Napoli)
5	MF	ARG	José Sosa (to (Argentina) Estudiantes (LP))
6	MF	GER	Max Meyer (to (Switzerland) Luzern, previously on loan at (Denmark) Midtjylland)
7	MF	TUR	Ozan Tufan (to (England) Hull City, previously on loan at (England) Watford)
10	MF	GER	Mesut Özil (to İstanbul Başakşehir)
11	FW	GER	Mërgim Berisha (on loan to (Germany) FC Augsburg)
14	MF	GRE	Dimitrios Pelkas (on loan to (England) Hull City)
20	MF	BRA	Luiz Gustavo (to (Saudi Arabia) Al-Nassr)
23	MF	TUR	Muhammed Gümüşkaya (to (Belgium) Westerlo, previously on loan at Giresunspor)
24	MF	TAN	Mbwana Samatta (on loan to (Belgium) Genk, previously on loan at (Belgium) Royal Antwerp)
32	DF	COD	Marcel Tisserand (to (Saudi Arabia) Al-Ettifaq)
35	GK	TUR	Berke Özer (to (Portugal) Portimonense)
37	DF	CZE	Filip Novák (to (United Arab Emirates) Al Jazira)
44	DF	SLE	Steven Caulker (to Fatih Karagümrük, previously on loan at Gaziantep)
58	FW	TUR	Tiago Cukur (on loan to (Belgium) Dender)
77	FW	TUR	Burak Kapacak (on loan to Fatih Karagümrük)
99	MF	ALB	Arda Okan Kurtulan (to Adana Demirspor)
—	MF	SEN	Lamine Diack (to Ankaragücü)
—	MF	TUR	Murat Sağlam (released)
—	FW	IRN	Allahyar Sayyadmanesh (to (England) Hull City, previously on loan)

=== Galatasaray ===
In:

No.	Pos.	Nation	Player
2	DF	FRA	Léo Dubois (from (France) Lyon)
4	DF	DEN	Mathias Ross (from (Denmark) AaB)
5	MF	URU	Lucas Torreira (from (England) Arsenal)
8	MF	NOR	Fredrik Midtsjø (from (Netherlands) AZ)
9	FW	SUI	Haris Seferovic (on loan from (Portugal) Benfica)
10	FW	BEL	Dries Mertens (from (Italy) Napoli)
26	MF	KOS	Milot Rashica (on loan from (England) Norwich City)
27	MF	POR	Sérgio Oliveira (from (Portugal) Porto)
30	MF	AUT	Yusuf Demir (from (Austria) Rapid Wien)
42	DF	TUR	Abdülkerim Bardakcı (from Konyaspor)
64	MF	ESP	Juan Mata (from (England) Manchester United)
88	DF	TUR	Kazımcan Karataş (from Altay)
99	FW	ARG	Mauro Icardi (on loan from (France) Paris Saint-Germain)

Out:

No.	Pos.	Nation	Player
3	DF	NOR	Omar Elabdellaoui (to (Norway) Bodø/Glimt)
4	MF	TUR	Taylan Antalyalı (on loan to Ankaragücu)
5	DF	TUR	Alpaslan Öztürk (on loan to Eyüpspor)
8	MF	NED	Ryan Babel (to Eyüpspor)
11	FW	EGY	Mostafa Mohamed (on loan to (France) Nantes)
17	FW	TUR	Oğulcan Çağlayan (on loan to Giresunspor, previously on loan at Eyüpspor)
19	DF	TUR	Ömer Bayram (to Eyüpspor)
20	MF	TUR	Emre Akbaba (to Adana Demirspor, previously on loan at Alanyaspor)
21	MF	ROU	Olimpiu Moruțan (on loan to (Italy) Pisa)
24	DF	TUR	Işık Kaan Arslan (on loan to Sarıyer)
27	DF	COD	Christian Luyindama (on loan to Antalyaspor)
30	MF	TUR	Atalay Babacan (on loan to Sarıyer)
33	MF	ROU	Alexandru Cicâldău (on loan to (United Arab Emirates) Ittihad Kalba)
35	MF	TUR	Aytaç Kara (to Kasımpaşa, previously on loan at Göztepe)
45	DF	BRA	Marcão (to (Spain) Sevilla)
46	DF	NGA	Valentine Ozornwafor (to (Belgium) Charleroi, previously on loan and later loaned to (France) Sochaux)
54	MF	TUR	Emre Kılınç (on loan to Ankaragücü)
66	MF	TUR	Arda Turan (retired)
77	MF	NGA	Jesse Sekidika (released)
80	FW	TUR	Ali Yavuz Kol (to Adana Demirspor)
88	DF	TUR	Semih Kaya (retired)
89	MF	ALG	Sofiane Feghouli (released)
90	FW	SEN	Mbaye Diagne (to Fatih Karagümrük)
98	GK	TUR	Berk Balaban (on loan to İskenderun, previously on loan at Niğde Anadolu)
99	GK	FRA	Fatih Öztürk (released)
—	GK	TUR	Batuhan Şen (on loan to Fatih Karagümrük)
—	FW	TUR	Eren Aydın (on loan to Sarıyer)

=== Gaziantep ===
In:

No.	Pos.	Nation	Player

Out:

No.	Pos.	Nation	Player
—	DF	SLE	Steven Caulker (loan return to Fenerbahçe, later sold to Fatih Karagümrük)
—	DF	TUR	Oğuz Ceylan (to Ankaragücü)
—	MF	MAR	Ahmed El Messaoudi (to (Netherlands) Emmen)
—	MF	TUR	Doğan Erdoğan (to (Netherlands) Fortuna Sittard)
—	MF	SVN	Amedej Vetrih (retired)
—	FW	NOR	Torgeir Børven (to (Norway) Vålerenga)

=== Giresunspor ===
In:

No.	Pos.	Nation	Player
7	MF	ESP	Borja Sainz (from (Spain) Alavés)
11	MF	CUW	Brandley Kuwas (from (Israel) Maccabi Tel Aviv)
20	FW	TUR	Oğulcan Çağlayan (on loan from Galatasaray, previously on loan at Eyüpspor)
—	FW	GER	Varol Tasar (on loan from (Switzerland) Luzern)

Out:

No.	Pos.	Nation	Player
—	DF	AUS	Aziz Behich (to (Scotland) Dundee United)
—	DF	SEN	Mamadou Diarra (to (France) Grenoble)
—	MF	NZL	Joe Champness (released)
—	MF	TUR	Muhammed Gümüşkaya (loan return to Fenerbahçe, later sold to (Belgium) Westerlo)
—	MF	NED	Joey Pelupessy (to (Netherlands) Groningen)
—	MF	SEN	Younousse Sankharé (released)
—	FW	MTN	Souleymane Doukara (to (Greece) Levadiakos)

=== Hatayspor ===
In:

No.	Pos.	Nation	Player
93	MF	CMR	Kévin Soni (on loan from (Greece) Asteras Tripolis)
—	DF	TUR	Cengiz Demir (from Antalyaspor, previously on loan at Akhisarspor)

Out:

No.	Pos.	Nation	Player
—	MF	MLI	Adama Traoré (to (England) Hull City)
—	FW	LBR	Mohammed Kamara (to (Israel) Hapoel Haifa)

=== İstanbul Başakşehir ===
In:

No.	Pos.	Nation	Player
5	DF	BRA	Léo Duarte (from (Italy) Milan, previously on loan)
9	FW	BFA	Bertrand Traoré (on loan from (England) Aston Villa)
10	MF	GER	Mesut Özil (from Fenerbahçe)
11	MF	FRA	Mounir Chouiar (from (France) Dijon)
59	DF	ALG	Ahmed Touba (from (Netherlands) RKC Waalwijk)

Out:

No.	Pos.	Nation	Player
—	DF	CPV	Carlos Ponck (to (Portugal) Chaves)
—	DF	TUR	Cemali Sertel (on loan to Antalyaspor)
—	MF	TUR	Soner Aydoğdu (to Antalyaspor)
—	MF	BEL	Nacer Chadli (on loan to (Belgium) Westerlo)
—	MF	TUR	Tolga Ciğerci (to Ankaragücü)
—	FW	NOR	Fredrik Gulbrandsen (to Adana Demirspor)
—	FW	MLI	Alya Toure (on loan to (Azerbaijan) Sumgayit)

=== İstanbulspor ===
In:

No.	Pos.	Nation	Player

Out:

No.	Pos.	Nation	Player
—	GK	TUR	Alperen Uysal (to Antalyaspor)
—	DF	TUR	Emrecan Uzunhan (to Beşiktaş)

=== Kasımpaşa ===
In:

No.	Pos.	Nation	Player
28	DF	ITA	Raoul Petretta (to (Switzerland) Basel)
35	MF	TUR	Aytaç Kara (from Galatasaray, previously on loan at Göztepe)
59	MF	KOS	Bersant Celina (on loan from (France) Dijon)
—	MF	HUN	Kevin Varga (loan return from (Switzerland) Young Boys)

Out:

No.	Pos.	Nation	Player
—	DF	SRB	Uroš Spajić (released)
—	FW	TUR	Umut Bozok (loan return to (France) Lorient, later sold to Trabzonspor)
—	FW	AUS	Awer Mabil (loan return to (Denmark) Midtjylland, later sold to (Spain) Cádiz)
—	FW	COD	Jackson Muleka (loan return to (Belgium) Standard Liège, later sold to Beşiktaş)

=== Kayserispor ===
In:

No.	Pos.	Nation	Player

Out:

No.	Pos.	Nation	Player
—	MF	SLE	Jocelyn Janneh (to (France) Bastia)
—	FW	ROU	Denis Alibec (to (Romania) Farul Constanța)
—	FW	NED	Kevin Luckassen (released)

=== Konyaspor ===
In:

No.	Pos.	Nation	Player
15	DF	CRC	Francisco Calvo (from (United States) San Jose Earthquakes)
29	FW	NGA	Uche Ikpeazu (from (England) Middlesbrough)

Out:

No.	Pos.	Nation	Player
—	DF	TUR	Abdülkerim Bardakcı (to Galatasaray)
—	FW	EGY	Ahmed Hassan (loan return to (Greece) Olympiacos)

=== Sivasspor ===
In:

No.	Pos.	Nation	Player
10	FW	CMR	Clinton N'Jie (from (Russia) Dynamo Moscow)
15	MF	GRE	Charis Charisis (from (Greece) Atromitos)
28	MF	CIV	Kader Keïta (from (Belgium) Westerlo)

Out:

No.	Pos.	Nation	Player
—	MF	TUR	Kerem Atakan Kesgin (to Beşiktaş)

=== Trabzonspor ===
In:

No.	Pos.	Nation	Player
9	FW	TUR	Umut Bozok (from (France) Lorient, previously on loan at Kasımpaşa)
23	FW	NED	Naci Ünüvar (on loan from (Netherlands) Ajax)
27	MF	EGY	Trézéguet (from (England) Aston Villa)
29	MF	MKD	Enis Bardhi (from (Spain) Levante)
61	MF	TUR	Yusuf Yazıcı (on loan from (France) Lille)

Out:

No.	Pos.	Nation	Player
—	DF	TUR	Abdurrahim Dursun (to Adana Demirspor)
—	DF	POR	Edgar Ié (released)
—	DF	TUR	Ahmetcan Kaplan (to (Netherlands) Ajax)
—	FW	CIV	Gervinho (to (Greece) Aris)
—	FW	CIV	Jean Evrard Kouassi (on loan to Fatih Karagümrük)

=== Ümraniyespor ===
In:

No.	Pos.	Nation	Player
1	GK	TUR	Serkan Kırıntılı (from Alanyaspor)
2	DF	TUR	Mert Yılmaz (on loan from Antalyaspor)
3	DF	ALB	Ermir Lenjani (from (Switzerland) Grasshopper)
7	MF	ROU	Valentin Gheorghe (on loan from (Romania) FCSB)
41	MF	TUR	Kartal Yılmaz (on loan from Beşiktaş)

Out:

No.	Pos.	Nation	Player
—	MF	SEN	Idrissa Camara (to (France) Dijon)
—	MF	BIH	Ajdin Hasić (loan return to Beşiktaş, later loaned to Göztepe)
