= 2023–24 MKE Ankaragücü season =

MKE Ankaragücü
2023–24 season
- President: Faruk Koca (until 12 December); İsmail Mert Fırat (since 12 December)
- Head coach: Tolunay Kafkas
- Stadium: Eryaman Stadium
- Süper Lig: 17th (relegated)
- Turkish Cup: Semi-finals
- Top goalscorer: League: Efkan Bekiroğlu (9); All: Efkan Bekiroğlu (10)
- Average home league attendance: 7,606

The 2023–24 season was MKE Ankaragücü's 114th season in existence and second consecutive in the Süper Lig. They also competed in the Turkish Cup.

On 12 December 2023, club president Faruk Koca resigned after punching a referee following the 11 December match between MKE Ankaragücü and Çaykur Rizespor The 11 December incident, which also saw fans invade the playing field pitch, also resulted in the suspension of all league games in Turkey until 19 December.

== Players ==
=== First-team squad ===
As of 21 August 2023

Note: Flags indicate national team as defined under FIFA eligibility rules; some limited exceptions apply. Players may hold more than one non-FIFA nationality.

| No. | Pos. | Nation | Player |
|---|---|---|---|
| 1 | GK | POL | Rafał Gikiewicz |
| 2 | DF | TUR | Alperen Kuyubaşı |
| 3 | DF | TUR | Alper Uludağ |
| 4 | DF | TUR | Atakan Çankaya |
| 5 | DF | CZE | Matěj Hanousek |
| 6 | MF | TUR | Cem Türkmen |
| 7 | MF | GRE | Anastasios Chatzigiovanis |
| 8 | MF | POR | Pedrinho |
| 9 | FW | BIH | Riad Bajić |
| 10 | MF | TUR | Efkan Bekiroğlu |
| 16 | MF | BIH | Andrej Đokanović |
| 17 | MF | GEO | Giorgi Beridze |
| 18 | DF | BIH | Nihad Mujakić |
| 22 | DF | GAM | Ali Sowe (on loan from Rostov) |

| No. | Pos. | Nation | Player |
|---|---|---|---|
| 23 | MF | TUR | Ali Kaan Güneren |
| 25 | DF | FRA | Enock Kwateng |
| 26 | DF | SRB | Uroš Radaković |
| 29 | FW | JAM | Renaldo Cephas |
| 30 | MF | TUR | Tolga Ciğerci |
| 41 | GK | TUR | Doğukan Kaya |
| 45 | DF | TUR | Mert Çetin (on loan from Verona) |
| 70 | DF | GRE | Stelios Kitsiou |
| 77 | DF | TUR | Hayrullah Bilazer |
| 96 | DF | TUR | Yusuf Eren Göktaş |
| 97 | MF | TUR | Onur Efe Ekri |
| 99 | GK | TUR | Bahadır Han Güngördü |
| — | MF | CPV | Garry Rodrigues |
| — | MF | ROU | Olimpiu Moruţan |

== Transfers ==
=== In ===
| Pos. | Player | Transferred from | Fee | Date | Source |
|---|---|---|---|---|---|
| DF | (Turkey) Mert Çetin | (Italy) Hellas Verona | Loan | 10 July 2023 | |
| MF | (Turkey) Tolga Ciğerci | (Germany) Hertha BSC | €350,000 | 11 July 2023 | |
| MF | (Turkey) Efkan Bekiroğlu | (Turkey) Alanyaspor | Free | 11 July 2023 | |
| GK | (Poland) Rafał Gikiewicz | (Germany) FC Augsburg | Free | 22 July 2023 | |
| MF | (Brazil) Renaldo Cephas | (North Macedonia) Shkupi | €400,000 | 8 August 2023 | |
| MF | (Cape Verde) Garry Rodrigues | (Greece) Olympiacos | Free | 19 August 2023 | |
| MF | (Romania) Olimpiu Moruţan | (Turkey) Galatasaray | €3,000,000 | 20 August 2023 | |
| MF | (Senegal) Lamine Diack | (France) Nantes | Loan return | 30 January 2024 | |

=== Out ===
| Pos. | Player | Transferred to | Fee | Date | Source |
|---|---|---|---|---|---|
| MF | (Senegal) Lamine Diack | (France) Nantes | Loan + €400,000 | 31 July 2023 | |
| MF | (Norway) Ghayas Zahid | (Serbia) Partizan | Free | 23 August 2023 | |
| MF | (Georgia (country)) Giorgi Beridze | (Turkey) Kocaelispor | Free | 12 September 2023 | |
| MF | (Senegal) Lamine Diack | (France) Nantes | €2,000,000 | 31 January 2024 | |
| GK | (Poland) Rafał Gikiewicz | (Poland) Widzew Łódź | Free | 13 February 2024 | |

== Pre-season and friendlies ==
Win Draw Loss

| 27 July 2023 Friendly | Pendikspor (Turkey) | 2–3 | (Turkey) Ankaragücü | Bolu |
| 18:00 UTC+3 | Bitin 24', 48' | | Sowe 20'; Đokanović 45'; Beridze 84' | Stadium: Vonresort Hotel Futbol Sahası |

| 31 July 2023 Friendly | Ankaragücü (Turkey) | 1–0 | (Turkey) Fatih Karagümrük | Kaynaşlı |
| 16:00 UTC+3 | Kitsiou 30' | | | Stadium: Fenerbahce SK Topuk Yaylasi Tesisleri |

| 5 August 2023 Friendly | Ankaragücü (Turkey) | 1–3 | (Turkey) Konyaspor | Ankara |
| 17:40 UTC+3 | Ciğerci 69' (pen.) | | Murić 28'; Demirbağ 59'; Büyüksayar 81' | Stadium: Beştepe Cemal Aydın Tesisleri |

== Competitions ==
=== Overall record ===
| Competition | First match | Last match | Starting round | Final position | Record | | | | | | | |
| Competition | First match | Last match | Starting round | Final position | Pld | W | D | L | GF | GA | GD | Win % |
|---|---|---|---|---|---|---|---|---|---|---|---|---|
| Süper Lig | 12 August 2023 | 26 May 2024 | Matchday 1 | 17th | 38 | 8 | 16 | 14 | 46 | 52 | −6 | 21.05 |
| Turkish Cup | 1 November 2023 | 7 May 2024 | Third round | Semi-finals | 6 | 4 | 1 | 1 | 14 | 4 | +10 | 66.67 |
| Total | | | | | 44 | 12 | 17 | 15 | 60 | 56 | +4 | 27.27 |

Source: Soccerway

=== Süper Lig ===
==== League table ====
| Pos | Team | Pld | W | D | L | GF | GA | GD | Pts | Qualification or relegation |
|---|---|---|---|---|---|---|---|---|---|---|
| 15 | Hatayspor | 38 | 9 | 14 | 15 | 45 | 52 | −7 | 41 (Note: Hatayspor are ahead of Konyaspor on overall goal difference.) | |
| 16 | Konyaspor | 38 | 9 | 14 | 15 | 40 | 53 | −13 | 41 | |
| 17 | Ankaragücü (R) | 38 | 8 | 16 | 14 | 46 | 52 | −6 | 40 (Note: Ankaragücü are ahead of Fatih Karagümrük on head-to-head points: Fatih Karagümrük 1–1 Ankaragücü, Ankaragücü 2–0 Fatih Karagümrük.) | Relegation to TFF First League |
| 18 | Fatih Karagümrük (R) | 38 | 10 | 10 | 18 | 49 | 52 | −3 | 40 | Relegation to TFF First League |
| 19 | Pendikspor (R) | 38 | 9 | 10 | 19 | 42 | 73 | −31 | 37 | Relegation to TFF First League |

Source: Süper Lig
Rules for classification: 1) Points; 2) Head-to-head points; 3) Head-to-head goal difference; 4) Head-to-head goals scored; 5) Goal difference; 6) Goals scored; 7) Play-off.
(R) Relegated

==== Results summary ====
| Overall | | | | | | | | Home | | | | | | Away | | | | | |
| Pld | W | D | L | GF | GA | GD | Pts | W | D | L | GF | GA | GD | W | D | L | GF | GA | GD |
|---|---|---|---|---|---|---|---|---|---|---|---|---|---|---|---|---|---|---|---|
| 37 | 8 | 16 | 13 | 44 | 48 | −4 | 40 | 6 | 9 | 4 | 21 | 18 | +3 | 2 | 7 | 9 | 23 | 30 | −7 |

Source: Trendyol Süper Lig

==== Results by round ====
| Round | 1 | 2 | 3 | 4 | 5 | 6 | 7 | 8 | 9 | 10 | 11 | 12 | 13 | 14 | 15 | 16 |
|---|---|---|---|---|---|---|---|---|---|---|---|---|---|---|---|---|
| Ground | A | H | A | H | A | H | A | H | A | H | A | H | A | H | H | A |
| Result | L | D | D | L | W | D | L | W | L | W | D | L | W | D | D | |
| Position | 14 | 14 | 15 | 17 | 12 | 12 | 14 | 12 | 12 | 11 | 12 | 14 | 11 | 12 | 11 | |

Source: Trendyol Süper Lig
A = Away; H = Home; W = Win; D = Draw; L = Loss

==== Matches ====
| 12 August 2023 1 | Kasımpaşa | 3–2 | Ankaragücü | Istanbul |
| 19:15 TRT (UTC+3) | Kara 30'; Fall 69'; Ben Ouanes 90+3', (yellow card) 90+4' | Report | Bekiroğlu 73'; Cephas 78' | Stadium: Recep Tayyip Erdoğan Stadium; Attendance: 2,256; Referee: Bahattin Şimşek |

| 21 August 2023 2 | Ankaragücü | 1–1 | Adana Demirspor | Istanbul |
| 21:00 TRT (UTC+3) | Bekiroğlu 42'; Ciğerci (yellow card) 90+1' | Report | Niang 26' (pen.); Rodrigues (yellow card) 90+3' | Stadium: Atatürk Olympic Stadium; Attendance: 628; Referee: Cihan Aydın |
Note: The match was moved to Atatürk Olympic Stadium after Eryaman Stadium was deemed unsuitable after inspection.

| 27 August 2023 3 | Fatih Karagümrük | 1–1 | Ankaragücü | Istanbul |
| 19:15 TRT (UTC+3) | Rohdén 44'; Ugur (yellow card) 80' | Report | Mujakić (yellow card) 55'; Bekiroğlu 57' | Stadium: Esenyurt Necmi Kadıoğlu Stadium; Attendance: 847; Referee: Turgut Doman |

| 3 September 2023 4 | Ankaragücü | 0–1 | Fenerbahçe | Ankara |
| 21:45 TRT (UTC+3) | Çetin (yellow card) 7'; Radaković (yellow card) 73' | Report | Osayi-Samuel 60'; Yüksek (yellow card) 78' (yellow-red card) 84'; Fred (yellow card) 90+3' | Stadium: Eryaman Stadium; Attendance: 16,662; Referee: Arda Kardeşler |

| 18 September 2023 5 | Sivasspor | 1–3 | Ankaragücü | Sivas |
| --:-- TRT (UTC+3) | | | | Stadium: New Sivas 4 Eylül Stadium |

| 24 September 2023 6 | Ankaragücü | 1–1 | Konyaspor | Ankara |
| 17:00 TRT (UTC+3) | | | | Stadium: Eryaman Stadium |

| 5 November 2023 11 | İstanbul Başakşehir | 3–3 | Ankaragücü | Istanbul |
| | | | | Stadium: Başakşehir Fatih Terim Stadium |

| 10 November 2023 12 | Ankaragücü | 0–4 | Antalyaspor | Ankara |
| 20:00 TRT (UTC+3) | | | | Stadium: Eryaman Stadium |

| 25 November 2023 13 | Gaziantep | 0–1 | Ankaragücü | Gaziantep |
| | | | | Stadium: Gaziantep Stadium |

| 3 December 2023 14 | Ankaragücü | 1–1 | Beşiktaş | Ankara |
| 19:00 TRT (UTC+3) | | | | Stadium: Eryaman Stadium |

| 11 December 2023 15 | Ankaragücü | 1–1 | Çaykur Rizespor | Ankara |
| 20:00 TRT (UTC+3) | | | | Stadium: Eryaman Stadium |

| 21 December 2023 17 | Ankaragücü | 0–0 | Hatayspor | Ankara |
| | | | | Stadium: Eryaman Stadium |

| 25 December 2023 18 | Pendikspor | 1–1 | Ankaragücü | Pendik |
| | | | | Stadium: Pendik Stadium |

| 6 January 2024 19 | Ankaragücü | 0–1 | Trabzonspor | Ankara |
| | | | | Stadium: Eryaman Stadium |

| 9 January 2024 16 | Alanyaspor | 1–1 | Ankaragücü | Alanya |
| | | | | Stadium: Alanya Stadium |

| 13 January 2024 20 | Ankaragücü | 3–1 | Kasımpaşa | Ankara |
| | | | | Stadium: Eryaman Stadium |

| 2 February 2024 24 | Ankaragücü | 0–0 | Sivasspor | Ankara |
| 17:00 TRT (UTC+3) | Cephas (yellow card) 50'; Hanousek (yellow card) 89' | | Poungouras (yellow card) 39'; Okumuş (yellow card) 82' | Stadium: Eryaman Stadium; Referee: Abdulkadir Bitigen |

| 11 February 2024 25 | Konyaspor | 1–0 | Ankaragücü | Konya |
| 16:00 TRT (UTC+3) | Prip 38' | | | Stadium: Konya Metropolitan Municipality Stadium; Referee: Direnç Tonusluoğlu |

| 18 February 2024 26 | Ankaragücü | 0–3 | Galatasaray | Ankara |
| 19:00 TRT (UTC+3) | | | Demirbay 13'; Sánchez 14'; Icardi 39' (pen.) | Stadium: Eryaman Stadium; Referee: Ali Şansalan |

| 24 February 2024 27 | Kayserispor | 3–2 | Ankaragücü | Kayseri |
| 13:30 TRT (UTC+3) | Kocaman (yellow card) 10'; Boa Morte (yellow card) 33'; Civelek (yellow card) 45+6'; Nazon 53'; Jeanvier 62'; Mané 90+3', (yellow card) 90+4' | | Sowe (yellow card) 30'; Bassogog 45'; Bekiroğlu 45+4'; Çankaya (yellow card) 45+6'; Radaković (yellow card) 65' | Stadium: Kadir Has Stadium; Referee: Turgut Doman |

| 2 March 2024 28 | Ankaragücü | 1–1 | İstanbulspor | Ankara |
| 13:30 TRT (UTC+3) | | | | Stadium: Eryaman Stadium |

| 13 April 2024 32 | Ankaragücü | 3–1 | Gaziantep | Ankara |
| | | | | Stadium: Eryaman Stadium |

| 19 April 2024 33 | Beşiktaş | 2–0 | Ankaragücü | Istanbul |
| 20:00 | | | | Stadium: Beşiktaş Stadium |

| 28 April 2024 34 | Çaykur Rizespor | 2–2 | Ankaragücü | Rize |
| 19:00 | | | | Stadium: Rize City Stadium |

| 3 May 2024 35 | Ankaragücü | 1–1 | Alanyaspor | Ankara |
| | | | | Stadium: Eryaman Stadium |

| 12 May 2024 36 | Hatayspor | 2–1 | Ankaragücü | Mersin |
| 19:00 | | | | Stadium: Mersin Stadium |

| 18 May 2024 37 | Ankaragücü | 0–0 | Pendikspor | Ankara |
| | | | | Stadium: Eryaman Stadium; Referee: Volkan Bayarslan |

| 26 May 2024 38 | Trabzonspor | v | Ankaragücü | Trabzon |
| 19:00 | | | | Stadium: Papara Park |
