= Andrej Đokanović =

Bosnian footballer (born 2001)

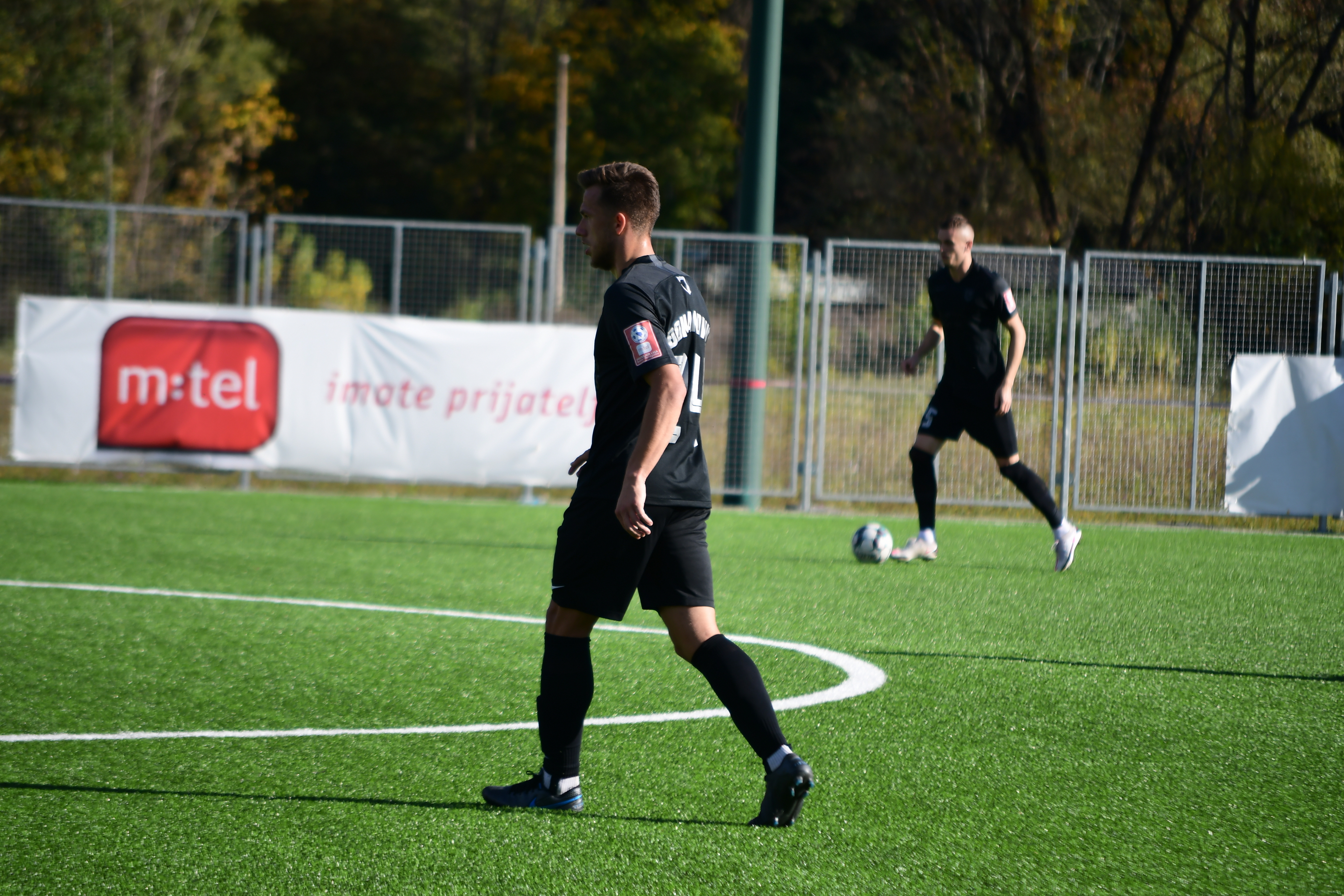

Personal information
- Date of birth: 1 March 2001 (age 25)
- Place of birth: Sarajevo, Bosnia and Herzegovina
- Height: 1.77 m (5 ft 10 in)
- Position: Defensive midfielder

Team information
- Current team: Ümraniyespor
- Number: 6

Youth career
- Novi Grad Sarajevo
- Sarajevo

Senior career*
Years	Team	Apps	(Gls)
2019–2023	Sarajevo	94	(2)
2023–2025	Ankaragücü	26	(0)
2024	→ Manisa (loan)	14	(2)
2024–2025	→ Ümraniyespor (loan)	17	(0)
2025–	Ümraniyespor	32	(1)

International career^{‡}
2017–2018	Bosnia and Herzegovina U17	8	(0)
2019	Bosnia and Herzegovina U19	5	(1)
2019–	Bosnia and Herzegovina U21	10	(0)
2021–	Bosnia and Herzegovina	2	(0)
- * Club domestic league appearances and goals as of 6 May 2026 ‡ National team caps and goals as of 19 December 2021

Andrej Đokanović (Serbian Cyrillic: Андреј Ђокановић; Bosnian pronunciation: [ǎndreːj dʑokâːnoʋitɕ]; born 1 March 2001) is a Bosnian professional footballer who plays as a defensive midfielder for Turkish TFF First League club Ümraniyespor , and the Bosnia and Herzegovina national team.

Đokanović started his professional career at Sarajevo.

A former youth international for Bosnia and Herzegovina, Đokanović made his senior international debut in 2021.

== Club career ==
=== Sarajevo ===
Đokanović started playing football at a local club, before joining the youth academy of his hometown club Sarajevo. In November 2017, he signed his first professional contract with the team. He won his first trophy with the club on 15 May 2019, by beating Široki Brijeg in Bosnian Cup final. On 25 May, he made his professional debut against GOŠK Gabela at the age of 18.

In August, Đokanović extended his contract until June 2024.

On 26 August 2020, he scored his first professional goal in UEFA Champions League qualifier against Dynamo Brest.

== International career ==
Đokanović represented Bosnia and Herzegovina on all youth levels.

In May 2021, he received his first senior call-up, for friendly games against Montenegro and Denmark. He debuted against the latter on 6 June.

== Career statistics ==
=== Club ===
As of match played 2 February 2025

Club	Season	League			National cup (Note: Includes Bosnia and Herzegovina Cup, Turkish Cup)		Continental		Total	
Club	Season	Division	Apps	Goals	Apps	Goals	Apps	Goals	Apps	Goals
Sarajevo	2018–19	Bosnian Premier League	1	0	1	0	—		2	0
Sarajevo	2019–20	Bosnian Premier League	17	0	2	0	4 (Note: Two appearances in UEFA Champions League; two appearances in UEFA Europa League)	0	23	0
Sarajevo	2020–21	Bosnian Premier League	30	0	5	0	4 (Note: Two appearances and one goal in UEFA Champions League; two appearances in UEFA Europa League)	1	39	1
Sarajevo	2021–22	Bosnian Premier League	29	2	6	0	2 (Note: Appearances in UEFA Europa Conference League)	0	37	2
Sarajevo	2022–23	Bosnian Premier League	17	0	1	0	—		18	0
Sarajevo	Total		94	2	15	0	10	1	119	3
Ankaragücü	2022–23	Süper Lig	14	0	3	0	—		17	0
Ankaragücü	2023–24	Süper Lig	12	0	2	0	—		14	0
Ankaragücü	Total		26	0	5	0	—		31	0
Manisa (loan)	2022–23	TFF First League	14	2	—		—		14	2
Ümraniyespor (loan)	2024–25	TFF First League	14	0	0	0	—		14	0
Career total			148	4	20	0	10	1	178	5

=== International ===
As of match played 18 December 2021

National team	Year	Apps	Goals
Bosnia and Herzegovina
Bosnia and Herzegovina	2021	2	0
Total		2	0

== Honours ==
Sarajevo

- Bosnian Premier League: 2018–19, 2019–20
- Bosnian Cup: 2018–19, 2020–21

Individual

- Bosnian Premier League Young Player of the Season: 2020–21
