= Sinan Osmanoğlu =

Turkish footballer

Personal information
- Date of birth: 9 January 1990 (age 36)
- Place of birth: Fatih, Turkey
- Height: 1.97 m (6 ft 6 in)
- Position: Centre back

Team information
- Current team: Vanspor
- Number: 5

Youth career
- 2002–2003: Galatasaray
- 2003–2006: Küçükçekmecespor
- 2006–2012: Galatasaray

Senior career*
Years	Team	Apps	(Gls)
2011–2012	Galatasaray	0	(0)
2011–2012	→ Bayrampaşaspor (loan)	30	(3)
2012–2017	Altınordu	140	(11)
2017–2018	Gaziantep	27	(2)
2018–2021	Altınordu	86	(2)
2021–2023	Ankaragücü	34	(6)
2023–2024	Çaykur Rizespor	16	(1)
2024	Manisa	14	(1)
2024–2026	Gençlerbirliği	41	(3)
2026	Çorum	18	(1)
2026–	Vanspor	9	(0)

International career^{‡}
2007–2008	Turkey U18	3	(0)
2008–2009	Turkey U19	22	(1)
- * Club domestic league appearances and goals as of 18 October 2026 ‡ National team caps and goals as of 23:25, 9 September 2022 (UTC)

Sinan Osmanoğlu (born 9 January 1990) is a Turkish professional footballer who plays as a centre back for TFF 1. Lig club Vanspor.

== Professional career ==
Osmanoğlu is a youth product of Galatasaray and Küçükçekmecespor. He began his senior career on 28 June 2011 with Galatasaray, going on loan with Bayrampaşaspor in the TFF Third League. He transferred permanently to Altınordu in the summer of 2012, and spent 5 seasons with them and helped them earn promotion twice from the TFF Third League to the TFF Second League. On 10 July 2017, he transferred to Gaziantep for one year. He again returned to Altınordu the following season, where he stayed for three more seasons. He transferred to Ankaragücü in June 2021. On his debut season with them, he helped them win the 2021–22 TFF First League. On 8 June 2022 he extended his contract with Ankaragücü for one more year as they prepared to play in the 2022-23 Süper Lig.

== International career ==
Osmanoğlu is a former youth international for Turkey, having played for the Turkey U18s and U19s.

== Honours ==
Altınordu

- TFF Third League: 2012–13
- TFF Second League: 2013–14

Ankaragücü

- TFF First League: 2021–22
