= Matěj Hanousek =

Czech footballer (born 1993)

Personal information
- Date of birth: 2 June 1993 (age 33)
- Place of birth: Prague, Czech Republic
- Height: 1.82 m (6 ft 0 in)
- Position: Left-back

Team information
- Current team: Dukla Prague
- Number: 15

Youth career
- Slavia Prague
- Dukla Prague

Senior career*
Years	Team	Apps	(Gls)
2013–2015	Dukla Prague	44	(0)
2015–2019	Jablonec	76	(0)
2019–2023	Sparta Prague	67	(1)
2021–2022	→ Wisła Kraków (loan)	31	(0)
2022	→ Gaziantep (loan)	20	(0)
2023	→ Ankaragücü (loan)	11	(0)
2023–2024	Ankaragücü	21	(0)
2024–2025	Athens Kallithea	13	(0)
2025–2026	Gençlerbirliği	39	(0)
2026–	Dukla Prague	3	(0)

International career
2013	Czech Republic U20	3	(0)
2013–2015	Czech Republic U21	13	(1)
- * Club domestic league appearances and goals as of 19:14, 11 August 2026 (UTC)

Matěj Hanousek (born 2 June 1993) is a Czech professional footballer who plays as a left-back for Czech National Football League club Dukla Prague. He has represented his country as a member of the national under-21 team.

== Career ==
Having made his professional debut with Dukla Prague, Hanousek joined Jablonec in September 2015.

On 4 July 2023, Hanousek signed a contract with Turkish side Ankaragücü.

On 2 August 2024, Hanousek signed a contract with Greek side Athens Kallithea.

On 16 January 2025, he moved to Turkish second-tier club Gençlerbirliği on an eighteen-month deal.

On 29 June 2026, Hanousek signed a contract with Dukla Prague.

== Career statistics ==
As of match played 7 August 2026

Appearances and goals by club, season and competition
Club	Season	League			National cup (Note: Includes Czech Cup, Polish Cup, Turkish Cup, Greek Cup, Turkish Cup)		Continental		Other		Total	
Club	Season	Division	Apps	Goals	Apps	Goals	Apps	Goals	Apps	Goals	Apps	Goals
Dukla Prague	2012–13	Czech First League	1	0	0	0	—		—		1	0
Dukla Prague	2013–14	Czech First League	16	0	5	0	—		—		21	0
Dukla Prague	2014–15	Czech First League	27	0	0	0	—		—		27	0
Dukla Prague	Total		44	0	5	0	—		—		49	0
Jablonec	2015–16	Czech First League	12	0	3	0	—		—		15	0
Jablonec	2016–17	Czech First League	17	0	1	0	—		—		18	0
Jablonec	2017–18	Czech First League	28	0	4	0	—		—		32	0
Jablonec	2018–19	Czech First League	19	0	2	0	6 (Note: Appearances in UEFA Europa League)	0	—		27	0
Jablonec	Total		76	0	10	0	6	0	—		92	0
Sparta Prague	2018–19	Czech First League	16	1	2	0	—		—		18	1
Sparta Prague	2019–20	Czech First League	26	0	4	2	2	0	—		32	2
Sparta Prague	2020–21	Czech First League	25	0	1	0	4	0	—		30	0
Sparta Prague	Total		67	1	7	2	6	0	0	0	80	3
Wisła Kraków (loan)	2021–22	Ekstraklasa	31	0	4	0	—		—		35	0
Gaziantep (loan)	2022–23	Süper Lig	20	0	2	0	—		—		22	0
Ankaragücü (loan)	2022–23	Süper Lig	11	0	2	0	—		—		13	0
Ankaragücü	2023–24	Süper Lig	21	0	3	0	—		—		24	0
Ankaragücü	Total		32	0	5	0	—		—		37	0
Athens Kallithea	2024–25	Super League Greece	13	0	1	0	—		—		14	0
Gençlerbirliği	2024–25	TFF 1. Lig	17	0	—		—		—		17	0
Gençlerbirliği	2025–26	TFF 1. Lig	22	0	4	0	—		—		26	0
Gençlerbirliği	Total		39	0	4	0	—		—		43	0
Dukla Prague	2026–27	Czech National Football League	3	0	0	0	—		—		3	0
Career total			325	1	38	2	12	0	0	0	375	3
