= Yasin Güreler =

Turkish footballer

Personal information
- Date of birth: 2 July 1991 (age 35)
- Place of birth: Konak, Turkey
- Height: 1.87 m (6 ft 2 in)
- Position: Left-back

Team information
- Current team: Manisa
- Number: 27

Youth career
- 2002–2005: İzmir Genç. Hiz. ve Spor İl Müd. Spor
- 2005–2007: Altay
- 2007–2008: Çamdibi Altınokspor
- 2009–2009: Türk Telekomspor
- 2009–2011: Yeşilova

Senior career*
Years	Team	Apps	(Gls)
2011–2018	Menemenspor	177	(10)
2018–2020	Hatayspor	10	(0)
2020–2021	Tuzlaspor	23	(0)
2021–2023	Ankaragücü	32	(3)
2023–2025	Gençlerbirliği	50	(4)
2025–	Manisa	21	(0)
- * Club domestic league appearances and goals as of 6 May 2026

Yasin Güreler (born 2 July 1991) is a Turkish football player who plays as a left-back for TFF 1. Lig club Manisa.

== Professional career ==
Güreler is a youth product of İzmir Gençlikvespor, Altay, Çamdibi Altınokspor, Türk Telekomspor and Yeşilova. He became a professional with Menemenspor in the TFF Third League in 2011, and played there for 7 years where he helped them achieve promotion to the TFF Second League. He transferred to Hatayspor in the summer of 2018, and he helped them win the 2019–20 season. On 15 August 2020, he transferred to Tuzlaspor on a free transfer. He moved to Ankaragücü in the summer of 2021, and again won the TFF First League, earning promotion to the Süper Lig. He made his Süper Lig debut with Ankaragücü in a 2–1 loss to Alanyaspor on 9 September 2022, scoring his side's only goal.

== Honours ==
Hatayspor

- TFF First League: 2019–20

Ankaragücü

- TFF First League: 2021–22
