= Uroš Radaković =

Serbian footballer (born 1994)

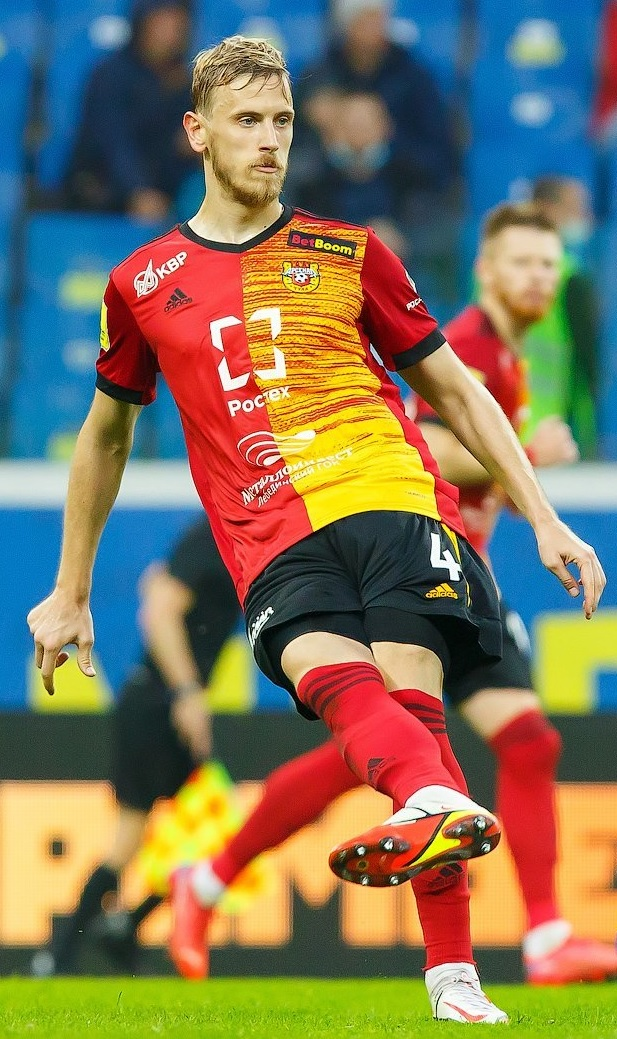
- Radaković with Arsenal Tula in 2021

Personal information
- Date of birth: 31 March 1994 (age 32)
- Place of birth: Belgrade, FR Yugoslavia
- Height: 1.94 m (6 ft 4 in)
- Position: Centre-back

Team information
- Current team: Buriram United
- Number: 26

Youth career
- –2011: Red Star Belgrade

Senior career*
Years	Team	Apps	(Gls)
2011–2012	Proleter Novi Sad	17	(0)
2012–2016	Bologna	0	(0)
2014–2015	→ Novara (loan)	3	(0)
2015–2016	→ Sigma Olomouc (loan)	27	(0)
2016–2018	Sigma Olomouc	49	(0)
2018–2021	Sparta Prague	28	(1)
2019–2020	→ Orenburg (loan)	15	(1)
2020	→ Astana (loan)	12	(0)
2021	→ Wisła Kraków (loan)	6	(1)
2021–2022	Arsenal Tula	18	(0)
2022–2024	Ankaragücü	57	(2)
2024–2025	Sivasspor	29	(4)
2025–2026	Nantes	5	(0)
2026–	Buriram United	0	(0)

International career
2010–2011	Serbia U17	18	(3)
2012	Serbia U19	3	(1)
2013	Serbia U21	1	(0)
- * Club domestic league appearances and goals as of 17 May 2026

Uroš Radaković (Serbian Cyrillic: Урош Радаковић; born 31 March 1994) is a Serbian professional footballer who plays as a centre-back for Thai League 1 club Buriram United.

== Career ==
Radaković made his debut for Bologna in the Coppa Italia on 28 November 2012, playing the full 90 minutes against Livorno. He played his second Coppa Italia game on 19 December 2012 against Napoli, again featuring for the full 90 minutes in a 2–1 away victory.

In August 2015, he joined Czech side Sigma Olomouc on loan.

In June 2018, he moved to Sparta Prague.

On 4 September 2019, he joined Russian Premier League club Orenburg on loan.

On 7 August 2020, Radaković was loaned to Kazakhstan Premier League club Astana.

On 24 February 2021, Radaković joined Ekstraklasa club Wisła Kraków on loan.

On 23 July 2021, he returned to Russian Premier League and signed with Arsenal Tula.

On 1 July 2025, Radaković signed for Ligue 1 club Nantes.

== Career statistics ==
As of 2 May 2026

Appearances and goals by club, season and competition
Club	Season	League			National cup (Note: Includes Serbian Cup, Coppa Italia, Czech Cup, Russian Cup, Turkish Cup, Coupe de France)		Continental		Total	
Club	Season	Division	Apps	Goals	Apps	Goals	Apps	Goals	Apps	Goals
Proleter Novi Sad	2011–12	Serbian First League	17	0	2	0	—		19	0
Bologna	2012–13	Serie A	0	0	2	0	—		2	0
Bologna	2013–14	Serie A	0	0	1	0	—		1	0
Bologna	2014–15	Serie B	0	0	0	0	—		0	0
Bologna	Total		0	0	3	0	—		3	0
Novara (loan)	2013–14	Serie B	3	0	—		—		3	0
Sigma Olomouc (loan)	2015–16	Czech First League	27	0	3	0	—		30	0
Sigma Olomouc	2016–17	Czech National Football League	19	0	1	0	—		20	0
Sigma Olomouc	2017–18	Czech First League	30	0	1	0	—		31	0
Sigma Olomouc	Total		76	0	5	0	—		81	0
Sigma Olomouc B	2015–16	Czech National Football League	1	0	—		—		1	0
Sigma Olomouc B	2016–17	Moravian-Silesian Football League	2	0	—		—		2	0
Sigma Olomouc B	Total		3	0	—		—		3	0
Sparta Prague	2018–19	Czech First League	25	1	3	1	2 (Note: Appearance(s) in UEFA Europa League)	0	30	2
Sparta Prague	2019–20	Czech First League	3	0	—		1	0	4	0
Sparta Prague	Total		28	1	3	1	3	0	34	2
Orenburg	2019–20	Russian Premier League	15	1	2	0	—		17	1
Astana	2020	Kazakhstan Premier League	12	0	—		2 (Note: One appearance in UEFA Champions League, one appearance in UEFA Europa League)	0	14	0
Wisła Kraków	2020–21	Ekstraklasa	6	1	—		—		6	1
Arsenal Tula	2021–22	Russian Premier League	18	0	1	0	—		19	0
Ankaragücü	2022–23	Süper Lig	22	1	2	0	—		24	1
Ankaragücü	2023–24	Süper Lig	35	1	5	1	—		40	2
Ankaragücü	Total		57	2	7	1	—		64	3
Sivasspor	2024–25	Süper Lig	29	4	3	0	—		32	4
Nantes	2025–26	Ligue 1	5	0	1	0	—		6	0
Career total			269	9	27	2	5	0	301	11
