= Nihad Mujakić =

Bosnian footballer (born 1998)

Personal information
- Date of birth: 15 April 1998 (age 28)
- Place of birth: Sarajevo, Bosnia and Herzegovina
- Height: 1.89 m (6 ft 2 in)
- Position: Centre-back

Team information
- Current team: Erzurumspor
- Number: 18

Youth career
- Sarajevo

Senior career*
Years	Team	Apps	(Gls)
2016–2019	Sarajevo	46	(0)
2019–2022	Kortrijk	1	(0)
2020–2021	→ Hajduk Split (loan)	26	(0)
2021–2022	→ Beveren (loan)	7	(0)
2022	Sarajevo	14	(0)
2022–2024	Ankaragücü	68	(1)
2024–2026	Partizan	26	(0)
2025–2026	→ Eyüpspor (loan)	16	(0)
2026	→ Gaziantep (loan)	11	(0)
2026–	Erzurumspor	12	(0)

International career^{‡}
2016	Bosnia and Herzegovina U19	4	(0)
2018–2020	Bosnia and Herzegovina U21	8	(0)
2023–	Bosnia and Herzegovina	13	(1)
- * Club domestic league appearances and goals as of 22 November 2026 ‡ National team caps and goals as of 28 September 2026

Nihad Mujakić (pronounced [nǐxad mǔjakitɕ]; born 15 April 1998) is a Bosnian professional footballer who plays as a centre-back for Süper Lig club Erzurumspor and the Bosnia and Herzegovina national team.

Mujakić started his professional career at Sarajevo, before joining Kortrijk in 2019, who loaned him to Hajduk Split in 2020 and to Beveren in 2021. The following year, he went back to Sarajevo. Later that year, he moved to Ankaragücü. In 2024, Mujakić was transferred to Partizan, who sent him on loan to Eyüpspor in 2025 and to Gaziantep in 2026. Later that year, he joined Erzurumspor.

A former youth international for Bosnia and Herzegovina, Mujakić made his senior international debut in 2023, earning 13 caps since. He represented the nation at the 2026 FIFA World Cup.

== Club career ==
=== Sarajevo ===
Mujakić came through the youth academy of his hometown club Sarajevo. In October 2015, he signed his first professional contract with the team. He made his professional debut against Zrinjski Mostar on 31 July 2016 at the age of 18.

In June 2018, he extended his deal with the squad until June 2023.

On 19 July 2018, he scored his first professional goal in a UEFA Europa League qualifier against Urartu.

He won his first trophy with the club on 15 May 2019, by beating Široki Brijeg in the Bosnian Cup final.

=== Kortrijk ===
In January 2019, Belgian outfit Kortrijk announced that Mujakić would join them at the end of the season on a four-year contract. He made his official debut for the team on 20 September against Mechelen.

In January 2020, he was sent on a 18-month loan to Croatian side Hajduk Split.

In August 2021, he was loaned to Beveren until the end of the season.

=== Return to Sarajevo ===
In January 2022, Mujakić returned to Sarajevo on a deal until June 2025. He played his first competitive game for the club since coming back against Leotar on 26 February.

=== Ankaragücü ===
In August, Mujakić was transferred to Turkish team Ankaragücü for an undisclosed fee. He debuted officially for the squad on 8 August against Konyaspor. On 13 January 2024, he scored his first goal for Ankaragücü in a triumph over Kasımpaşa.

=== Partizan ===
In June, Mujakić moved to Serbian outfit Partizan on a three-year contract. He debuted competitively for the side against Napredak Kruševac on 19 July.

In June 2025, he was sent on a season-long loan to Eyüpspor.

In January 2026, he was loaned to Gaziantep for the remainder of the campaign.

=== Later stage of career ===
In July, Mujakić signed with Erzurumspor.

== International career ==
Mujakić represented Bosnia and Herzegovina at various youth levels.

In November 2023, he received his first senior call up, for UEFA Euro 2024 qualifiers against Luxembourg and Slovakia. He debuted against the former on 16 November.

On 6 September 2025, in a 2026 FIFA World Cup qualifier against San Marino, he scored his first senior international goal.

In June 2026, Mujakić was named in Bosnia and Herzegovina's squad for the 2026 FIFA World Cup.

== Personal life ==
Mujakić married his long time-girlfriend Ezgi in December 2024.

He is a practising Muslim; together with international teammates Ermedin Demirović, Jusuf Gazibegović, Haris Tabaković, Haris Hajradinović, Dženis Burnić, Sead Kolašinac, Enver Kulašin, Nail Omerović, Benjamin Tahirović, Osman Hadžikić and Ermin Bičakčić he visited a mosque in Ilidža during the national team's concentration.

== Career statistics ==
=== Club ===
As of match played 22 November 2026

Appearances and goals by club, season and competition
Club	Season	League			National cup (Note: Includes Bosnian Cup, Belgian Cup, Croatian Cup, Turkish Cup, Serbian Cup)		Continental		Total	
Club	Season	Division	Apps	Goals	Apps	Goals	Apps	Goals	Apps	Goals
Sarajevo	2016–17	Bosnian Premier League	1	0	0	0	–		1	0
Sarajevo	2017–18	Bosnian Premier League	18	0	0	0	0	0	18	0
Sarajevo	2018–19	Bosnian Premier League	27	0	6	1	4 (Note: Appearances in UEFA Europa League)	1	37	2
Sarajevo	Total		46	0	6	1	4	1	56	2
Kortrijk	2019–20	Belgian Pro League	1	0	1	0	–		2	0
Hajduk Split (loan)	2019–20	Croatian Football League	9	0	–		–		9	0
Hajduk Split (loan)	2020–21	Croatian Football League	17	0	2	0	2	0	21	0
Hajduk Split (loan)	Total		26	0	2	0	2	0	30	0
Beveren (loan)	2021–22	Challenger Pro League	7	0	0	0	–		7	0
Sarajevo	2021–22	Bosnian Premier League	12	0	5	0	–		17	0
Sarajevo	2022–23	Bosnian Premier League	2	0	0	0	–		2	0
Sarajevo	Total		14	0	5	0	–		19	0
Ankaragücü	2022–23	Süper Lig	32	0	2	0	–		34	0
Ankaragücü	2023–24	Süper Lig	36	1	5	0	–		41	1
Ankaragücü	Total		68	1	7	0	–		75	1
Partizan	2024–25	Serbian SuperLiga	26	0	2	0	6 (Note: Two appearances in UEFA Champions League; two appearances in UEFA Europa League; two appearances in UEFA Conference League)	0	34	0
Eyüpspor (loan)	2025–26	Süper Lig	16	0	0	0	–		16	0
Gaziantep (loan)	2025–26	Süper Lig	11	0	2	0	–		13	0
Erzurumspor	2026–27	Süper Lig	12	0	0	0	–		12	0
Career total			227	1	25	1	12	1	264	3

=== International ===
As of match played 28 September 2026

Appearances and goals by national team and year
National team	Year	Apps	Goals
Bosnia and Herzegovina
Bosnia and Herzegovina	2023	2	0
Bosnia and Herzegovina	2024	3	0
Bosnia and Herzegovina	2025	5	1
Bosnia and Herzegovina	2026	3	0
Total		13	1

Scores and results list Bosnia and Herzegovina's goal tally first, score column indicates score after each Mujakić goal.

List of international goals scored by Nihad Mujakić
No.	Date	Venue	Cap	Opponent	Score	Result	Competition
1	6 September 2025	San Marino Stadium, Serravalle, San Marino	7	San Marino	6–0	6–0	2026 FIFA World Cup qualification

== Honours ==
Sarajevo

- Bosnian Premier League: 2018–19
- Bosnian Cup: 2018–19
