= Ali Sowe =

Gambian footballer (born 1994)

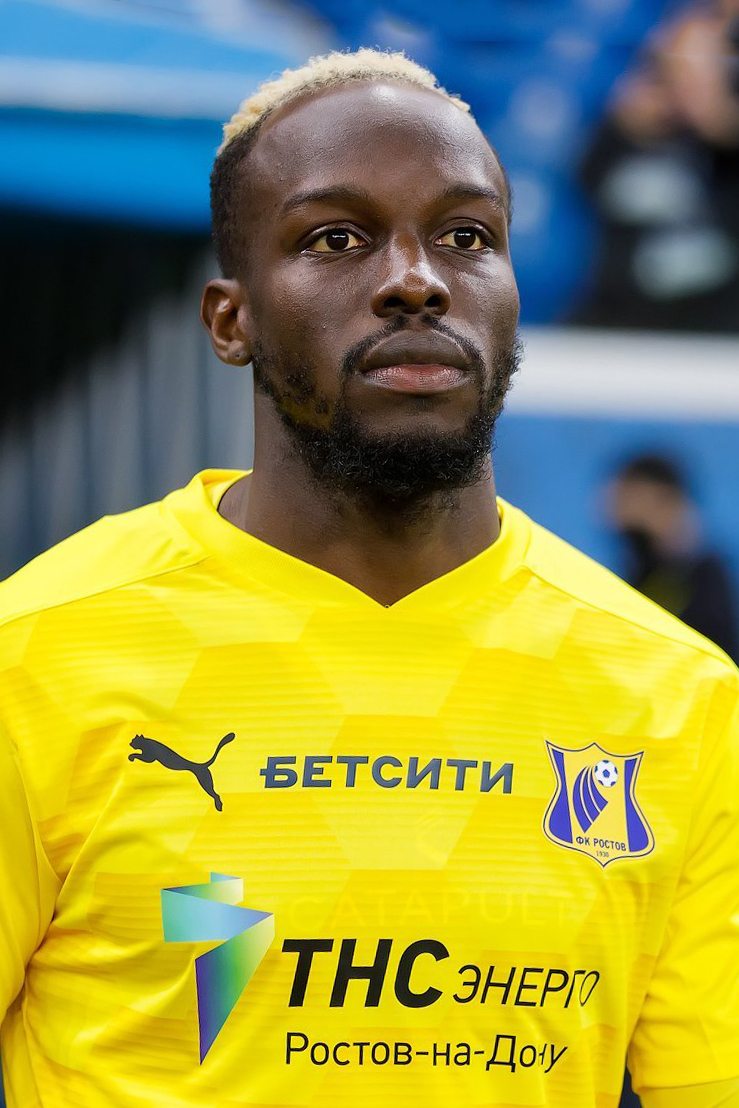
- Sowe with Rostov in 2021

Personal information
- Date of birth: 14 June 1994 (age 32)
- Place of birth: Banjul, Gambia
- Height: 1.91 m (6 ft 3 in)
- Position: Forward

Team information
- Current team: Çaykur Rizespor
- Number: 9

Youth career
- –2013: Gamtel
- 2013: Chievo

Senior career*
Years	Team	Apps	(Gls)
2013–2019	Chievo	2	(0)
2013–2014	→ Juve Stabia (loan)	35	(5)
2014	→ Pescara (loan)	8	(0)
2015	→ Latina (loan)	13	(0)
2015	→ Modena (loan)	8	(0)
2016	→ Lecce (loan)	9	(1)
2016–2017	→ Prato (loan)	15	(0)
2017	→ Vibonese (loan)	18	(6)
2017–2018	→ Skënderbeu (loan)	33	(21)
2018	→ CSKA Sofia (loan)	12	(3)
2019–2021	CSKA Sofia	62	(29)
2021	→ Rostov (loan)	11	(3)
2021–2025	Rostov	18	(4)
2022–2024	→ Ankaragücü (loan)	59	(18)
2024–2025	→ Çaykur Rizespor (loan)	36	(19)
2025–	Çaykur Rizespor	35	(9)

International career^{‡}
2011–	Gambia	14	(1)
- * Club domestic league appearances and goals as of 29 August 2026 ‡ National team caps and goals as of 8 September 2024

Ali Sowe (born 14 June 1994) is a Gambian professional footballer who plays as a forward for Süper Lig club Çaykur Rizespor and the Gambia national team.

== Club career ==
=== Early years ===
Sowe was made under contract in early 2013 by Chievo from Gambian club GAMTEL FC after he was already capped for the Gambia national team despite his very young age. He joined "Primavera" side for the Veronese club. After collecting two caps, on 18 July 2013, he was loaned to Juve Stabia alongside his Senegalese teammate N'Diaye Djiby, playing in the 2013–14 Serie B.

=== Skënderbeu ===
On 25 July 2017, Skënderbeu reached an agreement with Chievo for the loan of Sowe for 2017–18 season. The transfer was made official six days later, where he signed the contract and was assigned squad number 90.

He made his Skënderbeu debut on 17 August by starting in the first leg of 2017–18 UEFA Europa League play-off round against Dinamo Zagreb which finished in a 1–1 draw. In the second leg, the team held off and earned a goalless draw, with Sowe giving a strong performance, meaning that they have qualified to group stage for the second time in history, also becoming first Albanian club to successfully pass four rounds.

Sowe started the domestic season on 6 September by scoring a brace in the Albanian Cup first round 8–0 hammering of Adriatiku. His league debut occurred three days later in the opening day of 2017–18 Kategoria Superiore season against Flamurtari. He endured 244 minutes before netting his first goal in league, which came on 23 September in the matchday 3 against Partizani, helping Skënderbeu to their first win in six matches against Red Bulls. Sowe scored his first Europa League group stage goal five days later in the match against Young Boys.

He was named Albanian Superliga Player of the Month in October 2017. Sowe's second Europa League group stage goal came later on 23 November in the 3–2 win against Dynamo Kyiv which was their second ever group stage win. He concluded the first part of the season by netting a brace in the 3–1 home win over Teuta.

Sowe scored his first career hat-trick on 9 May 2018 in Skënderbeu's 4–2 away defeat of bottom side Lushnja; this win clinched the championship for the club with three games to spare. He finished the league by winning the Golden Boot, netting 21 goals in 33 games, beating out his rival Sindrit Guri.

=== CSKA Sofia ===
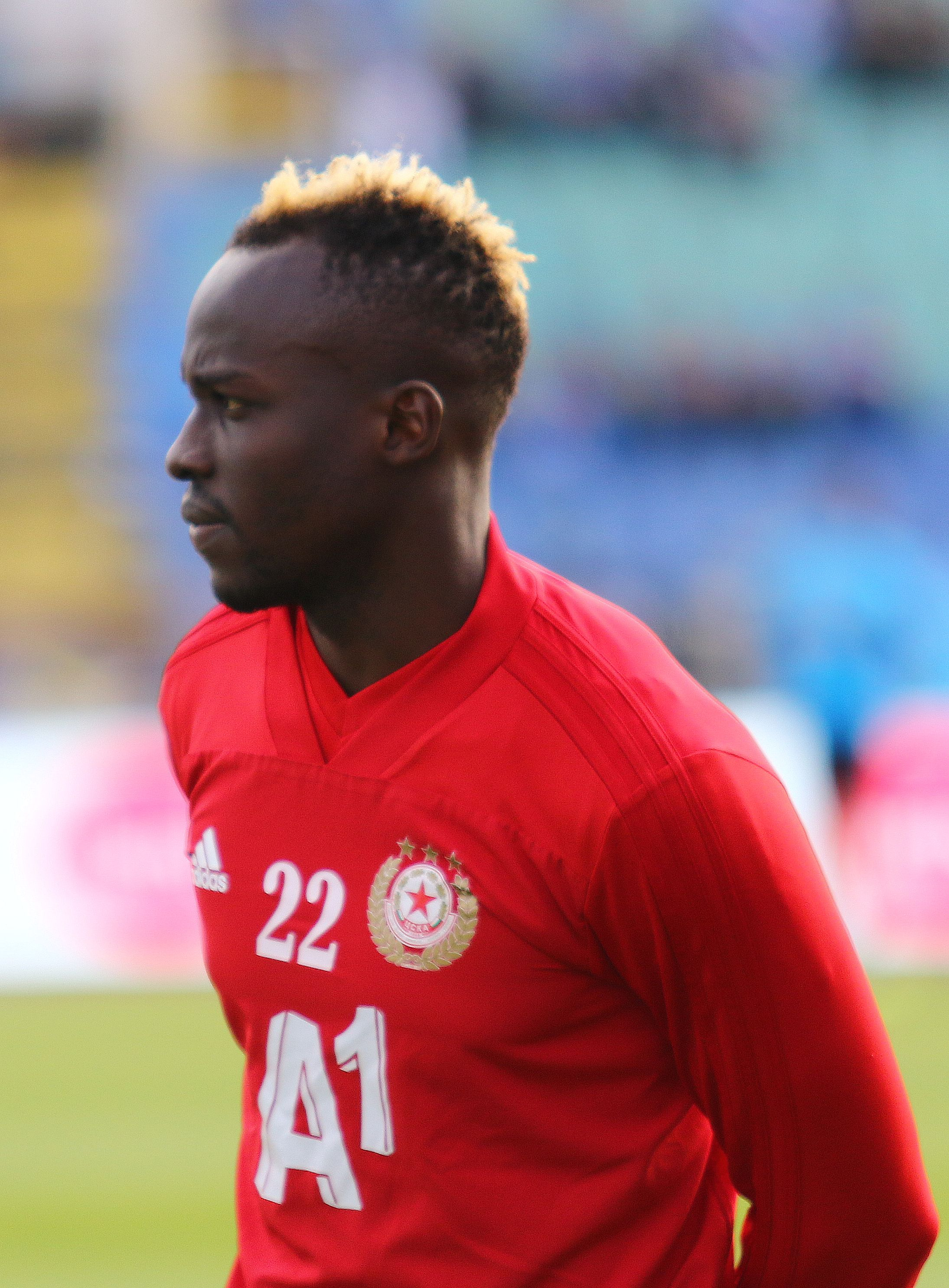
Sowe with CSKA Sofia in September 2018

On 5 September 2018, Sowe was loaned to Bulgarian club CSKA Sofia until the end of the season. On 31 January 2019, the transfer was made permanent, after CSKA activated his buyout clause. On 1 July 2020, he was the only player to miss from the spot in the 2020 Bulgarian Cup Final, with CSKA Sofia's opponents Lokomotiv Plovdiv lifting the trophy. On 10 December 2020, Sowe scored a brace in the 3–1 win over Roma in a UEFA Europa League match, though CSKA Sofia had already been eliminated from the tournament and finished in last place in their group. He established himself as the main forward for the team and became the foreign player with the most goals for CSKA Sofia in all tournaments, including solely in the league.

=== Rostov ===
On 16 February 2021, Sowe moved to Russian Premier League side Rostov, on a loan deal with an option to buy. On his league debut for Rostov on 27 February 2021, he scored twice to secure a 2–2 away draw against the defending champions Zenit Saint Petersburg.

On 10 June 2021, Rostov exercised their purchase option in the loan contract and Sowe signed a four-year contract with the club.

==== Loan to Ankaragücü ====
On 14 July 2022, Sowe joined Ankaragücü in Turkey on a season-long loan. In June 2023, the loan was extended for the 2023–24 season.

=== Çaykur Rizespor ===
On 3 July 2024, Sowe moved to another Turkish club Çaykur Rizespor for the 2024–25 season.

On 17 July 2025, Sowe returned to Çaykur Rizespor on a permanent basis and signed a three-season contract with the club.

== International career ==
Sowe earned his first cap for Gambia on 10 August 2011, in the 3–0 win over DR Congo in a friendly match. In January 2024, he was included in the country's squad for the 2023 Africa Cup of Nations. Sowe appeared in all three matches, being in the starting line-ups for the games against Senegal and Cameroon.

== Career statistics ==
=== Club ===
As of match played 31 May 2025

Appearances and goals by club, season and competition
Club	Season	League			National cup (Note: Includes Coppa Italia, Albanian Cup, Bulgarian Cup, Russian Cup, Turkish Cup)		Europe		Total	
Club	Season	Division	Apps	Goals	Apps	Goals	Apps	Goals	Apps	Goals
Chievo	2012–13	Serie A	2	0	0	0	—		2	0
Juve Stabia (loan)	2013–14	Serie B	35	5	1	0	—		36	5
Pescara (loan)	2014–15	Serie B	8	0	1	0	—		9	0
Latina (loan)	2014–15	Serie B	13	0	0	0	—		13	0
Modena (loan)	2015–16	Serie B	8	0	0	0	—		8	0
Lecce (loan)	2015–16	Serie C	9	1	0	0	—		9	1
Prato (loan)	2016–17	Serie C	15	0	1	0	—		16	0
Vibonese (loan)	2016–17	Serie C	18	6	0	0	—		18	6
Skënderbeu (loan)	2017–18	Kategoria Superiore	33	21	5	5	7 (Note: Appearances in UEFA Europa League)	2	45	28
CSKA Sofia (loan)	2018–19	Bulgarian First League	12	3	2	3	0	0	14	6
CSKA Sofia	2018–19	Bulgarian First League	16	8	3	3	0	0	19	11
CSKA Sofia	2019–20	Bulgarian First League	30	13	5	2	6	0	41	15
CSKA Sofia	2020–21	Bulgarian First League	16	8	1	1	10	5	27	14
CSKA Sofia	Total		74	32	11	9	16	5	101	46
Rostov (loan)	2020–21	Russian Premier League	11	3	1	0	–		12	3
Rostov	2021–22	Russian Premier League	18	4	1	0	–		19	4
Rostov	Total		29	7	2	0	–		31	7
Ankaragücü (loan)	2022–23	Süper Lig	32	12	4	4	–		36	16
Ankaragücü (loan)	2023–24	Süper Lig	27	6	3	0	–		30	6
Ankaragücü (loan)	Total		59	18	7	4	–		66	22
Çaykur Rizespor (loan)	2024–25	Süper Lig	36	19	4	0	–		40	19
Career total			339	109	32	18	23	7	394	134

=== International ===
As of 8 September 2024

Appearances and goals by national team and year
National team	Year	Apps	Goals
The Gambia	2011	1	0
The Gambia	2012	2	0
The Gambia	2013	2	0
The Gambia	2018	1	0
The Gambia	2019	1	0
The Gambia	2023	2	0
The Gambia	2024	5	1
Total		14	1

International goals

Scores and results list Gambia's goal tally first.

No.	Date	Venue	Opponent	Score	Result	Competition
1	8 September 2024	Ben M'Hamed El Abdi Stadium, El Jadida, Morocco	Tunisia	1–1	1–2	2025 Africa Cup of Nations qualifier

== Honours ==
Skënderbeu

- Kategoria Superiore: 2017–18

CSKA Sofia

- Bulgarian Cup: 2020–21

Individual

- Albanian Superliga Player of the Month: October 2017
- Albanian Superliga top goalscorer: 2017–18
