= Manisa F.K. =

Turkish football club

Manisa
- Full name: Manisa Futbol Kulübü
- Founded: 1994; 32 years ago (as Manisa Büyükşehir Belediyespor); 2019; 7 years ago (as Manisa Futbol Kulübü)
- Stadium: Manisa 19 Mayıs Stadium
- Capacity: 16,597
- Coordinates: 38°37′23″N 27°26′24″E
- Chairman: Mevlüt Aktan
- Head coach: Nestor El Maestro
- League: TFF 1. Lig
- 2025–26: TFF 1. Lig, 9th of 20
- Website: manisafk.com
| Home colours | Away colours | Third colours |

Manisa Futbol Kulübü is a Turkish professional football club based in Manisa. The club colours are black and white and they play their home matches at the Manisa 19 Mayıs Stadium.

== History ==
Founded in 1994 as Manisa Belediyespor, the club started to compete in the Turkish Regional Amateur League in the 2011–2012 season. After the 2013–14 season the club name was altered into Manisa Büyükşehir Belediyespor, referring to the metropolitan municipality status of Manisa. On 31 July 2019, the club changed its name from Manisa Büyükşehir Belediyespor into Manisa Futbol Kulübü, cutting its ties with the municipality.

The club secured the title 5 weeks before the end of the 2020–21 season in TFF Second League Group White. Manisa clinched their title with an unbeaten record in 36 games, becoming the first Turkish professional side to achieve this since 1991–1992.

The team previously played its home matches at the Mümin Özkasap Stadium.

== League history ==
- TFF First League: 2021–present
- TFF Second League: 2018–2021
- TFF Third League: 2015–18
- Regional Amateur League: 2011–15
- Super Amateur Leagues: 1994–2011

== Honours ==
- TFF Second League
  - Champions (1): 2020–21
- TFF Third League
  - Champions (1): 2017–18

== Players ==
=== Current squad ===
As of 23 September 2026

Note: Flags indicate national team as defined under FIFA eligibility rules; some limited exceptions apply. Players may hold more than one non-FIFA nationality.

| No. | Pos. | Nation | Player |
|---|---|---|---|
| 1 | GK | TUR | Vedat Karakuş |
| 2 | DF | TUR | Yunus Köse |
| 3 | DF | TUR | Osman Kaynak |
| 4 | DF | TUR | Fırat İnal |
| 5 | DF | MTQ | Christophe Hérelle |
| 6 | DF | TUR | Atakan Çankaya |
| 7 | DF | TUR | Yusuf Talum |
| 8 | MF | TUR | Kerem Arık |
| 9 | FW | MLI | Cheikne Sylla |
| 10 | MF | NOR | Jonathan Lindseth |
| 11 | MF | GAB | Noha Lemina |
| 13 | GK | TUR | Egemen Yaylı |
| 17 | FW | TUR | Osman Kahraman |

| No. | Pos. | Nation | Player |
|---|---|---|---|
| 20 | MF | MAR | Yassine Benrahou |
| 21 | MF | TUR | Emre Akboğa |
| 22 | MF | TUR | Kadir Yurdakul |
| 23 | MF | FRA | Julien Anziani |
| 24 | MF | TUR | Yunus Emre Dursun |
| 25 | MF | TUR | Ahmet Şen |
| 27 | DF | TUR | Yasin Güreler |
| 45 | DF | TUR | Ada İbik |
| 60 | MF | MLI | Birama Touré |
| 70 | FW | HON | Alenis Vargas (on loan from SJK Seinäjoki) |
| 96 | DF | TUR | Bican Tibukoğlu |
| 99 | GK | TUR | Metehan Başar |

=== Out on loan ===
Note: Flags indicate national team as defined under FIFA eligibility rules; some limited exceptions apply. Players may hold more than one non-FIFA nationality.

| No. / Pos. / Nation / Player; — / GK / TUR / Saim Sarp Bodur (at Aliağa FK until 30 June 2027) | No. / Pos. / Nation / Player; — / MF / TUR / Kazım Kahya (at 52 Orduspor until 30 June 2027) |
