= Sıtkı Ferdi İmdat =

Turkish footballer (born 2001)

Personal information
- Date of birth: 5 October 2001 (age 25)
- Place of birth: Altındağ, Turkey
- Position: Forward

Youth career
- 2013–2020: Ankaragücü

Senior career*
Years	Team	Apps	(Gls)
2020–2023	Ankaragücü	2	(0)
2020–2021	→ Altındağspor (loan)	3	(0)
2022	→ Iğdır (loan)	1	(0)
- * Club domestic league appearances and goals as of 31 May 2023

Sıtkı Ferdi İmdat (born 5 October 2001) is a Turkish professional footballer who plays as a forward.

== Career ==
İmdat is a youth product of Ankaragücü. He made his professional debut with Ankaragücü in a 1-0 Süper Lig win over Denizlispor on 25 June 2020. He joined Altındağspor in the TFF Third League on loan at the beginning of the 2020-21 season. He returned to Ankaragücü in January 2021, rejoining their youth sides. He again went on loan on 4 January 2022 joining Iğdır. He returned to Ankaragücü once more in the summer of 2022 as they were newly promoted to the Süper Lig.
