= Faruk Koca =

Turkish politician and sports official

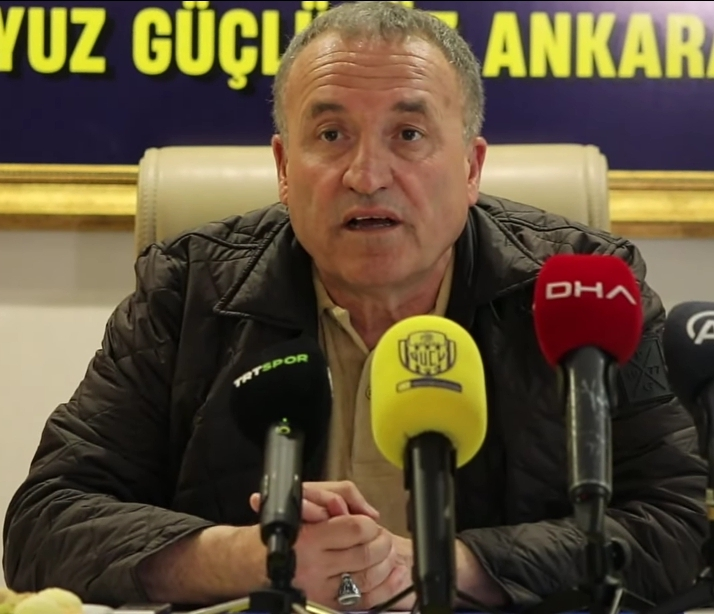
- Faruk Koca, 2023

President of MKE Ankaragücü
- In office 10 June 2021 – 12 December 2023
- Preceded by: Fatih Mert
- Succeeded by: İsmail Mert Fırat

Member of the Grand National Assembly
- In office 14 November 2002 – 23 April 2011
- Constituency: Ankara (I) (2002, 2007)

Personal details
- Born: 15 April 1964 (age 62) Derekışla, Ankara, Turkey
- Party: Justice and Development Party (2001–2023)
- Children: 4

Faruk Koca (born 15 April 1964 in Ankara) is a Turkish politician, entrepreneur, former sports official and convicted felon. He served as the president of MKE Ankaragücü between 2021 and 2023.

Koca is a founding member of the Justice and Development Party (AKP) and served from October 2002 to June 2011 during the 22nd Parliament of Turkey and 23rd Parliament of Turkey as a member of the Grand National Assembly of Turkey.

== Referee attack ==
On 11 December 2023, after Ankaragücü's match against Çaykur Rizespor, Koca physically assaulted referee Halil Umut Meler together with others and knocked him to the ground with a punch. According to statements from Justice Minister Yılmaz Tunç and Interior Minister Ali Yerlikaya, Koca and two other attackers were arrested.

In his statement to investigators, Koca said the incident was sparked by the referee’s "wrong decisions" and "provocative behaviour". In addition, Koca stated that he approached the referee with the intention of "spitting in his face" rather than attacking him. Koca also said: "The slap I threw will not cause fractures. After the slap I gave, the referee stood for about 5–10 seconds and then threw himself on the ground. They immediately removed me from the scene because I had heart disease. I am not aware of any events that took place other than this. That's all I have to say"; Meler, meanwhile, said he fell to the ground after Koca hit him under his left eye and threatened to kill him. Koca allegedly told Meler and his assistants: "I will finish you. I will kill you." Following the attack, former Ankaragücü coach Hikmet Karaman claimed he had also been assaulted by Koca.

A day after the incident, Koca apologized to Meler and his family in a press statement in which he also announced his resignation as the Ankaragücü club president.

On 14 December 2023, the TFF announced that Koca had been banned permanently for punching Meler. Ankaragücü were fined two million lira (£54,000) and ordered to play five home games without any fans.

On 27 December 2023, Koca was released on bail following his lawyer's objection being accepted. Koca stood trial on 9 January 2024 on charges of injuring a public official, threatening an official and violating a law relating to the prevention of violence in sports. On 11 November, Koca was convicted and sentenced to 3.5 years' imprisonment for assaulting Meler.
