= Atakan Çankaya =

Turkish footballer (born 1998)

Personal information
- Full name: Atakan Rıdvan Çankaya
- Date of birth: 25 June 1998 (age 28)
- Place of birth: Bayrakli, Turkey
- Height: 1.80 m (5 ft 11 in)
- Position: Midfielder

Team information
- Current team: Manisa
- Number: 6

Youth career
- 2008–2016: Altay

Senior career*
| Years | Team | Apps | (Gls) |
| 2016–2019 | Altay | 69 | (5) |
| 2019–2020 | Ankaraspor | 36 | (1) |
| 2020–2024 | Ankaragücü | 68 | (1) |
| 2021–2022 | → Göztepe (loan) | 24 | (0) |
| 2024–2026 | Fatih Karagümrük | 49 | (6) |
| 2026 | Iğdır | 18 | (2) |
| 2026– | Manisa | 10 | (1) |

International career
| 2013–2014 | Turkey U16 | 7 | (0) |
| 2017 | Turkey U19 | 2 | (0) |
| 2018 | Turkey U20 | 4 | (0) |
| 2018 | Turkey U21 | 5 | (0) |
- * Club domestic league appearances and goals as of 19 October 2026

Atakan Rıdvan Çankaya (born 25 June 1998) is a Turkish professional footballer who plays as a midfielder for TFF 1. Lig club Manisa.

== Career ==
A youth product of Altay, Çankaya transferred to Ankaraspor in 2019 in the TFF First League. On 11 September 2020, he signed his first professional contract with Ankaragücü. Çankaya made his professional debut with Ankaragücü in a 0-0 Süper Lig tie with Sivasspor on 27 June 2020.
