= Stelios Kitsiou =

Greek footballer

Personal information
- Full name: Stylianos Kitsiou
- Date of birth: 28 September 1993 (age 33)
- Place of birth: Thessaloniki, Greece
- Height: 1.75 m (5 ft 9 in)
- Position: Right-back

Team information
- Current team: Panserraikos
- Number: 70

Youth career
- 2007–2012: PAOK

Senior career*
Years	Team	Apps	(Gls)
2012–2019	PAOK	103	(2)
2017–2018	→ Sint-Truiden (loan)	34	(0)
2019	→ Ankaragücü (loan)	14	(0)
2019–2021	Ankaragücü	61	(3)
2021–2023	Gaziantep	52	(1)
2023–2025	Ankaragücü	53	(2)
2025–2026	Pendikspor	29	(3)
2026–	Panserraikos	0	(0)

International career^{‡}
2011	Greece U19	2	(0)
2013–2014	Greece U21	6	(1)
2015	Greece	2	(0)
- * Club domestic league appearances and goals as of 5 May 2026 ‡ National team caps and goals as of 11 October 2015

Stelios Kitsiou (Greek: Στέλιος Κίτσιου; born 28 September 1993) is a Greek professional footballer who plays as a right-back for Super League 2 club Panserraikos.

== Early life ==
Born in Thessaloniki, Kitsiou started out playing for local teams and he joined Pavlos Melas at the age of 14. Having had trials with PAOK and Aris, he chose to join PAOK U20s, being discreetly influenced by his family. In PAOK U20s he got to feature in all positions except for goalkeeper and central defender. His adjustment skills were remarkable but he seemed more at ease at midfield.

== Club career ==
=== PAOK ===
Kitsiou signed his first professional contract with PAOK in 2012 and took part in the seniors’ preseason in the summer 2012. Not 20 yet, he believed that he could help the team further. Kitsiou made his debut with PAOK in the Greek championship, participating in the win against AEK Athens on 20 October 2012. He got to play in some matches, but not as many as he expected. However he made it to the deciding play-offs and was introduced in the right side of the defense, (filling the void of injured Dimitris Konstantinidis) in the crucial last encounter against PAS Giannina. His performance along with his personality became his calling card as Huub Stevens was checking out his upgraded roster for 2013–14 season. In the preseason, he snatched the opportunity and Stevens rewarded him. He became the starting right full-back for the 2013–14 season. He also scored his first goal with the club in a 4–1 home victory against Panionios. On 22 November 2013, PAOK announced its agreement with Stelios Kitsiou to extend his contract until 2018. Four days later he netted his first European goal against Shakhter Karagandy when substitute Salpingidis played a square pass for him to rifle high into the net from an angle. In the 2014–15 season Kitsiou playing in a mediocre, for him and the club, period 30 games in all competitions.

He started the 2015–16 season as a starter. On 12 October 2015, he had a calf injury and will be out of action for three weeks, according to the club's medical team. He started the 2016–17 season not as a first choice for the starting XI. On 11 January 2017 he scored in a 2–0 away Greek Cup win against Panetolikos He also scored in the Super League Greece after almost three years in a 2–0 home win game against AEL.

==== Loan to Sint-Truiden ====
On 26 June 2017, the details of Kitsiou borrowing to Belgian club Sint-Truiden are of interest as they prove that the deal is identical to what was done for Charis Charisis. The borrowing comes with a €1.2 million purchase option and 20% resale. Moreover, because Kitsiou contract is concluded in the summer of 2018, before the signing of the loan documents his contract with PAOK will be extended till the summer of 2019.

=== Ankaragücü ===
On 31 January 2019, Ankaragücü officially announced the signing of the Greek defender on a five-month loan deal. On 24 July 2019, Kitsiou made his move to Ankaragucu permanent after spending the second half of the season on loan in Turkey from PAOK. PAOK released an official statement announcing Kitsiou's move. Kitsiou, who was on the books for PAOK for 12 seasons (including his time in the club's academies), signed a three-year contract with the Turkish club for an undisclosed fee. PAOK will receive a reported €200,000 for Kitsiou's transfer. On 14 December 2019, in a 2–2 away draw game against giants Galatasaray he scored a late goal sealing a vital draw in his club effort to avoid relegation. It was his first goal with the club in all competitions.

=== Gaziantep ===
On 12 August 2021, Stelios Kitsiou has officially announced by Turkish club Gaziantep, signing a two years(with additional one) contract, for an undisclosed fee. The former right back-half international, after Ankaragutsu, with whom he had 77 matches with three goals and 12 assists, will continue in Süper Lig.

== International career ==
On 28 August 2015, Kitsiou was among the calls of the Greek national football team's coach Kostas Tsanas for qualifying matches of Euro 2016 against Finland and Romania. On 7 September 2015, he made his debut with Greece in an away 0–0 against Romania. By making his debut, as a player of PAOK, with the national emblem at the age of 21, Kitsiou wrote his name in another list as he overpassed for two days the Alexander the Great of Greek football, one of the best Greeks ever to play the game Giorgos Koudas.

== Career statistics ==
=== Club ===
As of 19:42, 2 March 2024 (UTC).

Club	Season	League			Cup		Continental		Other		Total	
Club	Season	Division	Apps	Goals	Apps	Goals	Apps	Goals	Apps	Goals	Apps	Goals
PAOK	2012–13	Super League Greece	5	0	3	0	—		—		8	0
PAOK	2013–14	Super League Greece	30	1	5	0	11	1	—		46	2
PAOK	2014–15	Super League Greece	24	0	2	0	4	0	—		30	0
PAOK	2015–16	Super League Greece	22	0	3	0	8	1	—		33	1
PAOK	2016–17	Super League Greece	16	1	9	1	2	0	—		27	2
PAOK	2018–19	Super League Greece	2	0	3	0	0	0	—		5	0
PAOK	Total		103	2	25	1	25	2	—		153	5
Sint-Truiden (loan)	2017–18	Belgian First Division A	34	0	1	0	—		—		35	0
Ankaragücü (loan)	2018–19	Süper Lig	14	0	—		—		—		14	0
Ankaragücü	2019–20	Süper Lig	31	2	0	0	—		—		31	2
Ankaragücü	2020-21	Süper Lig	30	1	0	0	—		—		30	1
Ankaragücü	2022-23	Süper Lig	12	1	2	0	—		—		14	0
Ankaragücü	2023-24	Süper Lig	18	0	3	0	—		—		21	1
Ankaragücü	Total		91	4	5	0	—		—		96	4
Gaziantep	2021–22	Süper Lig	32	0	1	0	—		—		33	0
Gaziantep	2022-23	Süper Lig	20	1	1	0	—		—		21	1
Gaziantep	Total		52	1	2	0	—		—		54	1
Career total			294	7	33	1	25	2	0	0	352	10

== Honours ==
PAOK

- Greek Cup: 2016–17
