= Fıratcan Üzüm =

Turkish footballer (born 1999)

Personal information
- Date of birth: 4 June 1999 (age 27)
- Place of birth: Eskişehir, Turkey
- Height: 1.78 m (5 ft 10 in)
- Position: Midfielder

Team information
- Current team: Gençlerbirliği
- Number: 88

Youth career
- 2010–2017: Eskişehirspor

Senior career*
Years	Team	Apps	(Gls)
2017–2019	Eskişehirspor	32	(4)
2019–2021	Trabzonspor	3	(0)
2020	→ Ümraniyespor (loan)	3	(0)
2021–2022	Adanaspor	36	(2)
2022–2023	Ankaragücü	10	(0)
2023–2024	Göztepe	16	(1)
2024–	Gençlerbirliği	39	(0)
- * Club domestic league appearances and goals as of 1 June 2026

Fıratcan Üzüm (born 4 June 1999) is a Turkish professional footballer who plays as a midfielder for Gençlerbirliği.

== Professional career ==
A youth product of Eskişehirspor since 2010, Üzüm signed his first professional contract with them on 17 May 2017 and began his senior career in the TFF First League. On 17 June 2019, transferred to Trabzonspor from Eskişehirspor, signing a 3-year contract. Üzüm made his professional debut with Trabzonspor in a 2-2 Süper Lig tie with Gençlerbirliği S.K. on 15 September 2019. On 31 January 2020, he joined Ümraniyespor on loan for the secon half of the 2019–20 season.

On 1 February 2021, Üzüm moved to Adanaspor. In the summer of 2022, he signed a 2-year contract with Ankaragücü. The following summer, on 15 August 2023 he moved to Göztepe.

== Honours ==
Trabzonspor

- Turkish Cup: 2019–20
