= Bahadır Han Güngördü =

Turkish footballer

Personal information
- Date of birth: 16 January 1996 (age 30)
- Place of birth: Çorum, Turkey
- Height: 1.90 m (6 ft 3 in)
- Position: Goalkeeper

Team information
- Current team: Konyaspor
- Number: 13

Youth career
- 2009–2012: Çorum Gençlerbirliği
- 2012–2016: Kardemir Karabükspor

Senior career*
Years	Team	Apps	(Gls)
2016–2019	Trabzonspor	0	(1)
2016–2018	→ Ankara Demirspor (loan)	54	(0)
2018–2019	→ 1461 Trabzon (loan)	31	(0)
2020	Boluspor	0	(0)
2020–2021	Ankara Demirspor	12	(0)
2021–2025	Ankaragücü	56	(0)
2025–	Konyaspor	22	(0)
2025	→ Iğdır (loan)	18	(0)
- * Club domestic league appearances and goals as of 10 June 2026

Bahadır Han Güngördü (born 16 January 1996) is a Turkish football player who plays as a goalkeeper for Süper Lig club Konyaspor.

== Professional career ==
Güngördü is a youth product of the academies of Çorum Gençlerbirliği and Kardemir Karabükspor, signing his first professional contract with the latter in 2015. He transferred to Trabzonspor on 28 July 2016. He began his senior career on loan with Ankara Demirspor in 2016where he spent three seasons, and then had a stint as the starter on loan at 1461 Trabzon for the 2018-19 season. His contract was mutually terminated with Trabzonspor on 28 June 2016. On 4 January 2021, he transferred to Boluspor signing a 2.5 year contract where he was the backup goalkeeper. He spent the 2021-21 season in a return season with Ankara Demirspor, where he made 12 appearances in the league. He moved to Ankaragücü on 6 July 2021. He helped Ankaragücü win the 2021–22 TFF First League and earn promotion into the Süper Lig, playing in the last 2 matches that clinched the trophy. He made his professional debut in the Süper Lig with Ankaragücü in a 0–0 tie with Konyaspor on 8 August 2022.

== Personal life ==
Güngördü was married on 24 June 2022 to Rümeysa Çetinkaya.

== Honours ==
Ankaragücü

- TFF First League: 2022–23
