= Oğuz Ceylan =

Turkish footballer (born 1990)

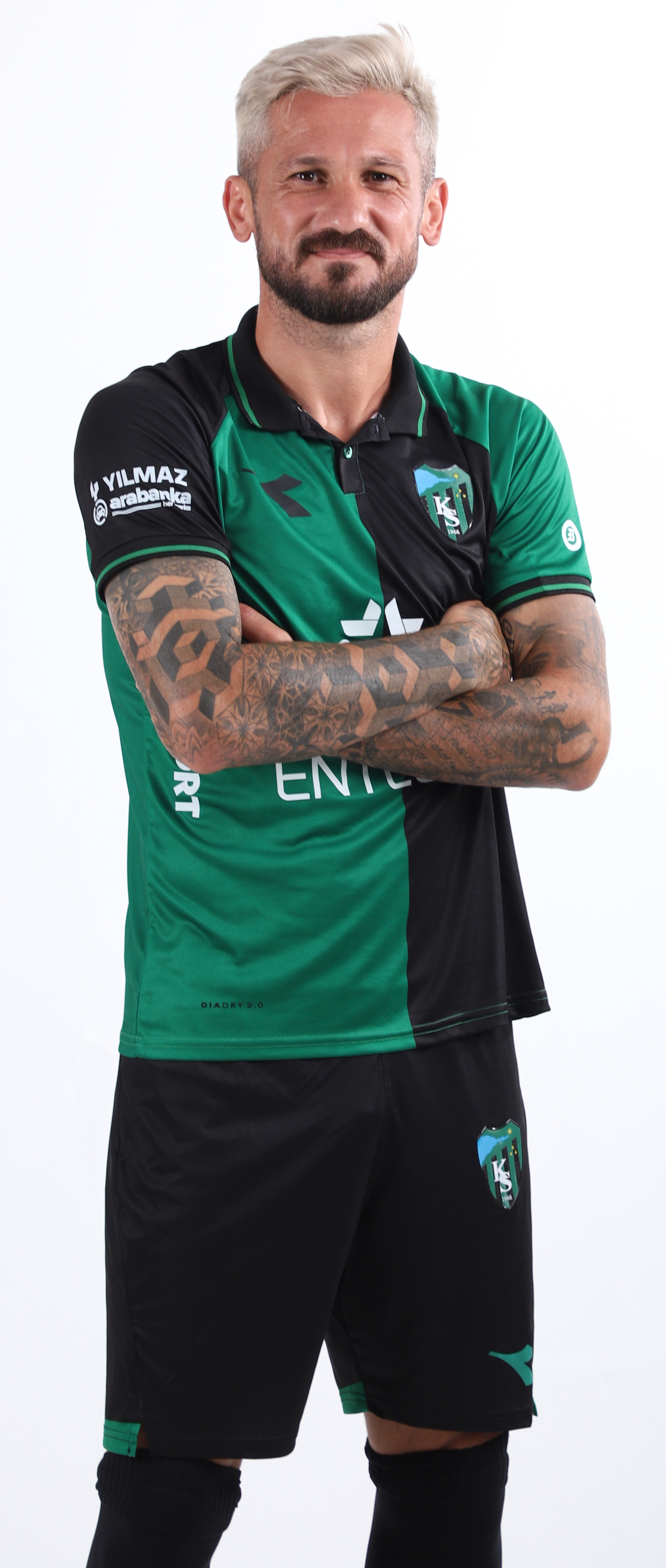

Personal information
- Date of birth: 16 December 1990 (age 35)
- Place of birth: Çanakkale, Turkey
- Height: 1.74 m (5 ft 9 in)
- Position: Right back

Team information
- Current team: İnegölspor

Youth career
- 2003–2005: Kepezspor
- 2005–2009: Çanakkale Dardanelspor
- 2009–2011: Beşiktaş

Senior career*
Years	Team	Apps	(Gls)
2011–2012	Beşiktaş	0	(0)
2011–2012	→ Siirtspor (loan)	17	(0)
2012	→ Çaykur Rizespor (loan)	0	(0)
2012–2013	1920 Maraşspor	27	(3)
2013–2014	BAKspor	23	(0)
2014–2015	Kartalspor	32	(0)
2015–2019	Ümraniyespor	102	(3)
2019–2022	Gaziantep	93	(1)
2019–2023	Ankaragücü	12	(0)
2023	Çaykur Rizespor	8	(0)
2023–2024	Kocaelispor	23	(0)
2024–2025	Esenler Erokspor	18	(0)
2025–2026	Kastamonuspor	8	(0)
2026	Bandırmaspor	16	(0)
2026–	İnegölspor	0	(0)
- * Club domestic league appearances and goals as of 5 May 2026

Oğuz Ceylan (born 15 December 1990) is a Turkish footballer who plays as a right back for TFF 2. Lig club İnegölspor..

== Professional career ==
Ceylan is a product of the youth academies of Kepezspor, Dardanelspor and Beşiktaş. He started his professional career with successive loans to Siirtspor and Rizespor. He left Beşiktaş in 2012, and had stints with semi-pro clubs Maraşspor, BAKspor, Kartalspor and Ümraniyespor from 2012 to 2019. Ceylan made his professional debut with Gazişehir Gaziantep in a 4–1 Süper Lig win over Gençlerbirliği on 26 August 2019. On 1 July 2019, he transferred to Gaziantep in the TFF First League, signing a 1.5 year initial contract. The team achieved promotion to the Süper Lig for the 2020–21 season, and Ceylan extended his contract with Gaziantep for 3 years. On 4 July 2022, he transferred to MKE Ankaragücü signing a 2-year contract.
