= Lamine Diack (footballer) =

Senegalese footballer (born 2000)

Personal information
- Date of birth: 15 November 2000 (age 25)
- Place of birth: Dakar, Senegal
- Height: 1.86 m (6 ft 1 in)
- Position: Defensive midfielder

Team information
- Current team: Nantes

Youth career
- Oslo FA

Senior career*
Years	Team	Apps	(Gls)
2019–2021	Shkupi	52	(5)
2021–2022	Tuzlaspor	34	(2)
2022–2024	Ankaragücü	26	(2)
2023–2024	→ Nantes (loan)	1	(0)
2023–2024	→ Nantes B (loan)	1	(1)
2024–	Nantes	0	(0)
2024	→ Colorado Rapids (loan)	4	(0)
2024–2025	→ Hatayspor (loan)	21	(0)
2025–2026	→ Sion (loan)	9	(0)

International career
2019	Senegal U20	2	(0)
- * Club domestic league appearances and goals as of 26 May 2026

Lamine Diack (born 15 November 2000) is a Senegalese professional footballer who plays as a defensive midfielder for French Ligue 2 club Nantes.

== Club career ==
A product of the youth academy of the Oslo FA in Senegal, Diack transferred to the Macedonian club Shkupi on 7 June 2019, signing a two-year contract. After two seasons in the Macedonian First Football League, Diack moved to the TFF First League with Tuzlaspor on 11 August 2021. In the summer of 2022 his license was issued to Fenerbahçe, who promptly transferred him to Ankaragücü on 25 July 2022 on a 3+1 year contract. He made his Süper Lig with Ankaragücü in a 0–0 tie with Konyaspor on 8 August 2022.

On 31 July 2023, Ligue 1 club Nantes announced the signing of Diack on a season-long loan with a future obligatory buy clause.

After Nantes made the transfer permanent, Diack moved on a six-months loan to Major League Soccer club Colorado Rapids. He left Colorado on 30 June 2024. On 23 July 2025, Diack moved on a new loan to Sion in Switzerland.

== International career ==
Diack represented the Senegal U20s at the 2019 Africa U-20 Cup of Nations.

== Career statistics ==
As of match played 31 May 2025

Appearances and goals by club, season and competition
Club	Season	League			Cup		Europe		Other		Total	
Club	Season	Division	Apps	Goals	Apps	Goals	Apps	Goals	Apps	Goals	Apps	Goals
Shkupi	2019–20	Prva Liga	22	1	0	0	2 (Note: Appearances in UEFA Europa League)	0	—		24	1
Shkupi	2020–21	Prva Liga	30	4	0	0	1	0	—		31	4
Shkupi	Total		52	5	0	0	3	0	—		55	5
Tuzlaspor	2021–22	TFF 1. Lig	34	2	1	0	—		—		35	2
Ankaragücü	2022–23	Süper Lig	26	2	6	1	—		—		32	3
Nantes (loan)	2023–24	Ligue 1	1	0	0	0	—		—		1	0
Nantes B (loan)	2023–24	National 3	1	1	—		—		—		1	1
Nantes	2024–25	Ligue 1	0	0	0	0	—		—		0	0
Nantes	2025–26	Ligue 1	0	0	0	0	—		—		0	0
Nantes	Total		0	0	0	0	—		—		0	0
Colorado Rapids (loan)	2024	MLS	4	0	—		—		—		4	0
Hatayspor (loan)	2024–25	Süper Lig	21	0	2	0	—		—		23	0
Career total			139	6	9	1	3	0	0	0	151	7
