= Eryaman Stadium =

Football stadium in Eryaman district of Ankara, Turkey

Eryaman Stadyumu
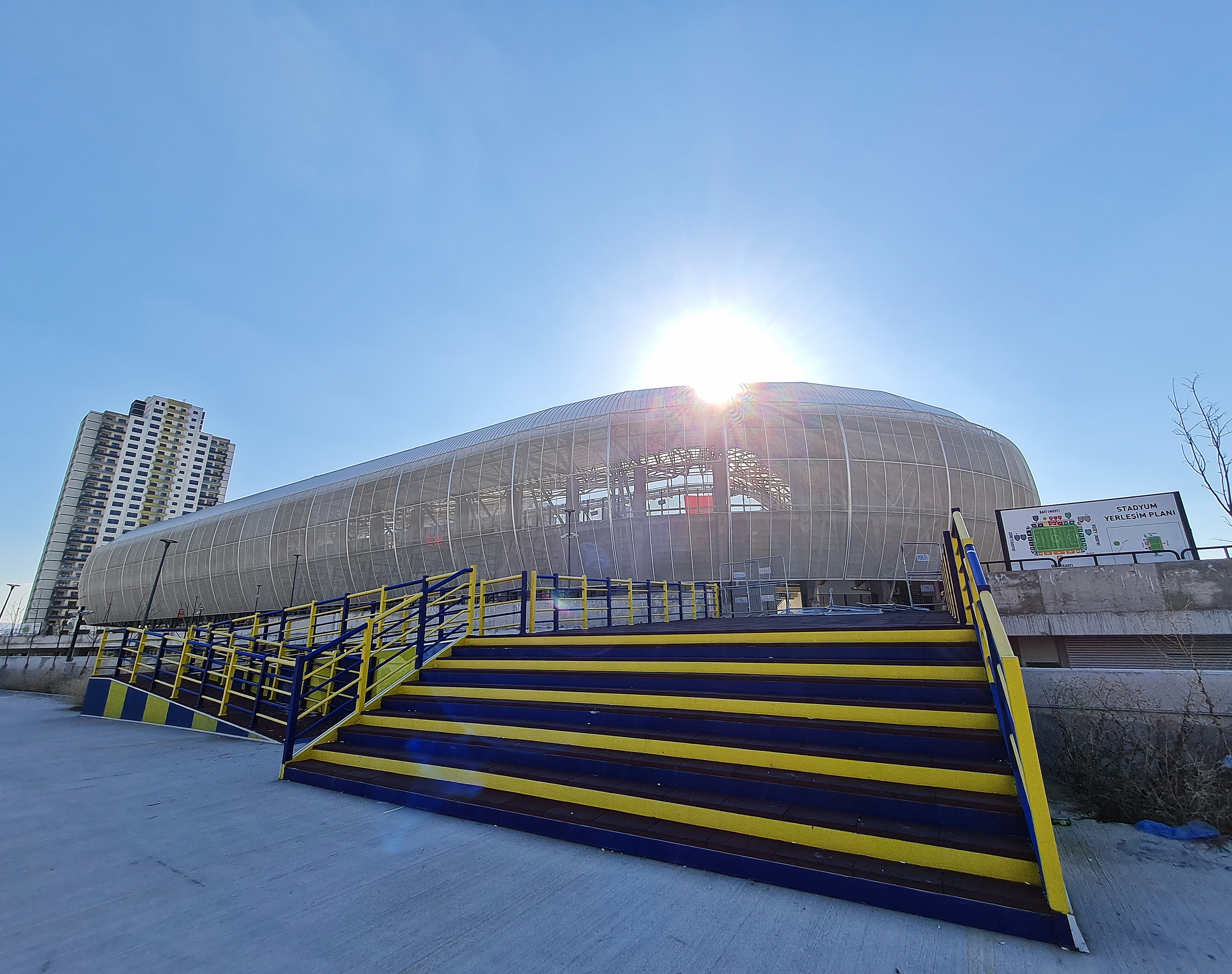

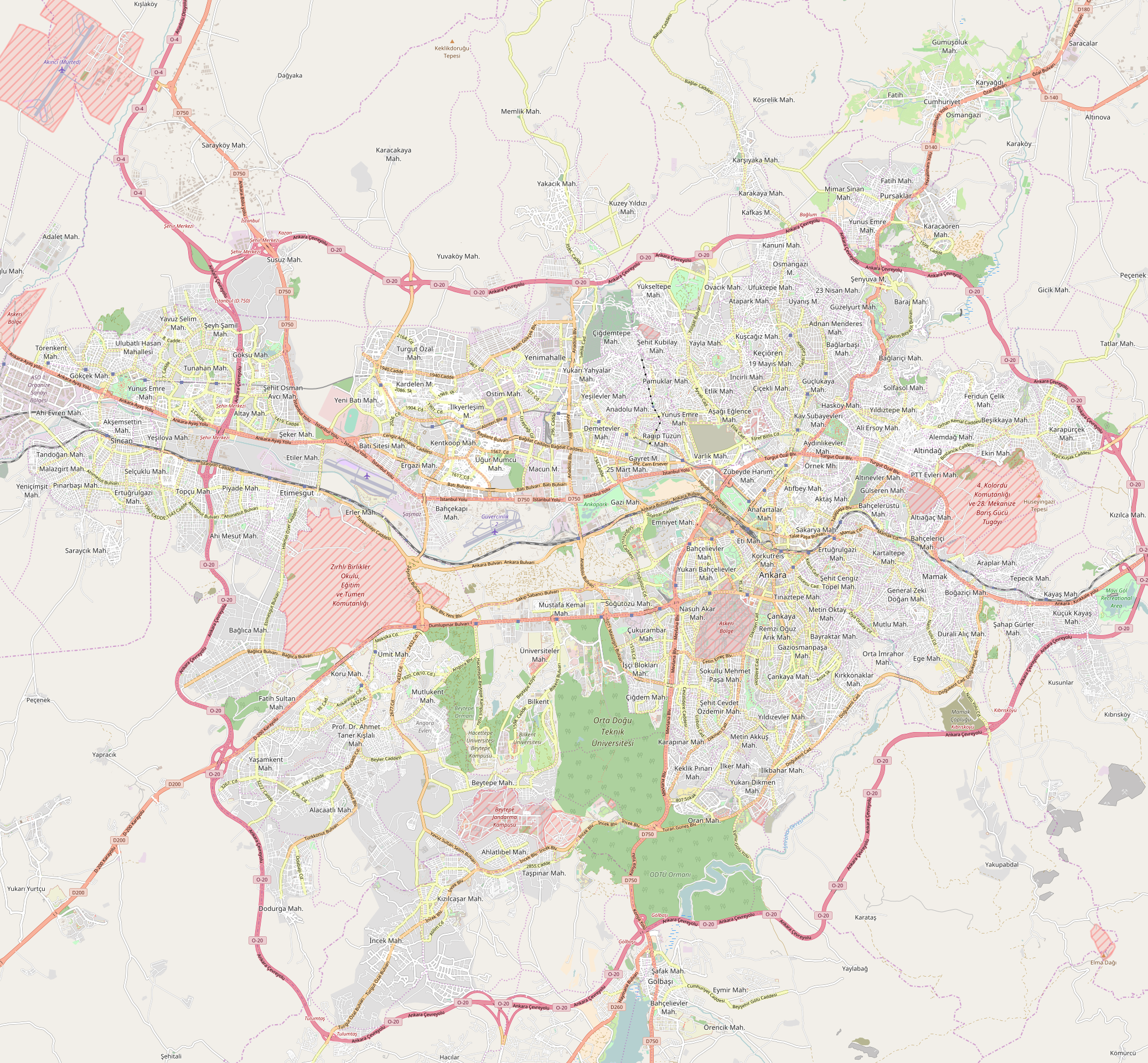
- Location in Ankara Location in Turkey
- Location: Eryaman, Ankara, Turkey
- Coordinates: 39°58′49″N 32°36′50″E
- Capacity: 20,560
- Executive suites: 51
- Record attendance: 18,012 (MKE Ankaragücü-Fenerbahçe SK, 15 February 2020)

Construction
- Groundbreaking: 5 May 2016
- Opened: 28 January 2019
- Architect: DBArchitects
- General contractor: Söğüt İnşaat

Tenants
- Gençlerbirliği (2019–present); Ankaragücü (2019–present)

The Eryaman Stadium (Turkish: Eryaman Stadyumu) is a stadium in the Eryaman neighbourhood of Etimesgut, Ankara, Turkey. The construction began in 2016 and was completed in 2019. Gençlerbirliği and Ankaragücü use the stadium for their home games.

== History ==
The 19 May Stadium, located in the city center, became unused, leading to the initiation of construction in the Eryaman district as an alternative. The foundation of the stadium was laid on May 5, 2016. Initially planned to have a capacity of 18,000 spectators, it was later increased to 22,000. Consequently, the project was revised, causing a delay in the stadium's opening. On January 28, 2019, the stadium was inaugurated with a match between MKE Ankaragücü and Alanyaspor teams in the Süper Lig. Alanyaspor won the match 2-0, with Djalma Campos scoring the first goal in the stadium from a penalty kick.

== Properities ==
The stadium, consisting of four floors, features 1,222 VIP seats, 658 lodge seats, 20 seats for disabled individuals and their companions, and a press tribune for 48 people. Additionally, there are 5,080 square meters of commercial space and 49 lodge units. It has an open parking area for 734 vehicles, a closed parking area for 38 vehicles, and 7 bus parking spaces. With a capacity of 22,000 spectators, the stadium occupies an area of 62,255 square meters. It is equipped with hybrid turf, making it the first stadium in Ankara to utilize this system. Furthermore, the stadium also features a turf ventilation, underfloor heating, and irrigation system.
