= Ali Kaan Güneren =

Turkish footballer

Personal information
- Date of birth: 8 April 2000 (age 26)
- Place of birth: Merzifon, Turkey
- Height: 1.70 m (5 ft 7 in)
- Position: Midfielder

Team information
- Current team: Muğlaspor (on loan from Iğdır)
- Number: 23

Youth career
- 2011–2012: Amasyaspor
- 2012–2017: Amasya Belediyespor
- 2017–2019: Akhisarspor

Senior career*
Years	Team	Apps	(Gls)
2018–2021	Akhisarspor	30	(1)
2021–2025	Ankaragücü	108	(8)
2022–2023	→ Samsunspor (loan)	22	(1)
2025–	Iğdır	29	(1)
2026–	→ Muğlaspor (loan)	11	(0)

International career^{‡}
2020–2022	Turkey U21	8	(0)
- * Club domestic league appearances and goals as of 24 October 2026 ‡ National team caps and goals as of 14 June 2022

Ali Kaan Güneren (born 8 April 2000) is a Turkish football player who plays as a midfielder for TFF 1. Lig club Muğlaspor on loan from Iğdır.

== Professional career ==
A youth product of Amasyaspor, Amasya Belediyespor, Akhisarspor, Güneren signed his first professional contract with Akhisarspor in November 2018. He made his professional debut with Akhisarspor in a 0-0 Süper Lig tie with Konyaspor on 25 May 2019. He transferred to Ankaragücü on 21 January 2021.

On 8 September 2022, Güneren joined Samsunspor on a season-long loan with an option to buy.

== International career ==
Güneren made his debut for the Turkey U21s in a 1–0 2021 UEFA European Under-21 Championship qualification win over Andorra U21 on 9 September 2020.
