= 2021–22 Galatasaray S.K. season =

Galatasaray
2021–22 season
- President: Burak Elmas
- Head coach: Fatih Terim (until 10 January 2022); Domènec Torrent (from 11 January 2022)
- Stadium: Nef Stadium
- Süper Lig: 13th
- Turkish Cup: Fifth round
- UEFA Champions League: Second qualifying round
- UEFA Europa League: Round of 16
- Top goalscorer: League: Kerem Aktürkoğlu (10); All: Kerem Aktürkoğlu (13)
- Highest home attendance: 50,110 (vs. Barcelona, 17 March 2022, UEFA Europa League)
- Lowest home attendance: 3,017 (vs. Hatayspor, 23 August 2021, Süper Lig)
- Biggest win: 4–2 (vs. St Johnstone (A), 12 August 2021, UEFA Europa League); 4–2 (vs. Marseille (H), 25 November 2021, UEFA Europa League); 4–2 (vs. Çaykur Rizespor (H), 27 February 2022, Süper Lig)
- Biggest defeat: 1–5 (vs. PSV Eindhoven (A), 21 July 2021, UEFA Champions League)
| Home colours | Away colours | Third colours |

The 2021–22 season was the 118th season in the existence of Galatasaray and the club's 64th consecutive season in the top flight of Turkish football. In addition to the domestic league, Galatasaray participated in this season's edition of the Turkish Cup, the UEFA Champions League and the UEFA Europa League. Galatasaray was eliminated in the 5th round of the Turkish Cup and finished the season in 13th place, the worst ranking in its history. This meant that the team would not compete in Europe in the 2022-23 season for the first time since the 2016-17 season.

== Overview ==
=== June 2021 ===
Galatasaray Sports Club elected its 38th president at the Ordinary Elective General Assembly held on 19 June 2021. Burak Elmas became the new president of the Yellow-Red Club.

=== August 2021 ===
In the statement made on 19 August 2021, the Professional Football Disciplinary Committee of the Turkish Football Federation banned Marcão from 8 official matches and fined 21.000 Turkish Liras, for inflicting violence on his teammate Kerem Aktürkoğlu in the match between Galatasaray and Giresunspor in the Süper Lig.

=== September 2021 ===
In the first week of the Süper Lig, the yellow and red club announced that the Brazilian football player was fined for Marcão, who attacked Kerem Aktürkoğlu in the match played with Giresunspor. In the information made by the club on 2 September 2021, Galatasaray Sportif A.Ş. It was announced that with the decision taken by the Board of Directors, a fine of 150,000 Euros was imposed.

=== October 2021 ===
In the statement made on 12 October 2021, a sponsorship and advertising promotion agreement regarding stadium naming rights worth 725.000.000 Turkish Liras + VAT for a total of 10 (5+5) seasons, including 5 seasons, was signed between Galatasaray Sports Club and Timur Şehircilik Planning A.Ş. In accordance with this agreement, the name of the stadium, which was Türk Telekom Stadium, was changed to Nef Stadium.

=== November 2021 ===
In a statement made on 25 November 2021, the Turkish Football Federation Professional Football Disciplinary Committee announced that Fatih Terim, who received a red card in the Fenerbahçe derby, was banned for 5 matches and fined 29,500 Turkish Liras. Terim will not be at the head of his team in 6 matches with the penalty he received from a double yellow card.

=== December 2021 ===
Galatasaray Sports Club Vice President and Galatasaray Sportif A.Ş. Acting Chairman, Attorney Doctor Rezan Epözdemir announced on 15 December 2021 that he resigned from these duties and membership of the board of directors for personal reasons.

Galatasaray Sports Club General Secretary Şükrü Köksal Ünlü announced on 16 December 2021 that he resigned from this position and from the board of directors for personal reasons.

In the statement made by Galatasaray Sports Club on 17 December 2021, Galatasaray Sports Club Association Vice President and Galatasaray Sportif A.Ş. Acting Chairman, Lawyer Doctor Rezan Epözdemir, on 15 December 2021 and Galatasaray Sports Club Association General Secretary Şükrü Köksal Ünlü resigned from their duties and all board memberships on 16 December 2021, with the common opinion of the board of directors and in accordance with the Bylaws, Ibrahim, one of the alternate members of the Board of Directors of Galatasaray Sports Club Association. It has been announced that Reha Keskin and Ahmet Ozan Şener will serve as members of the board of directors.

=== January 2022 ===
In the official statement made on 10 January 2022, Galatasaray manager Fatih Terim was sacked from his post after meeting with President Burak Elmas at Nef Stadium. On 11 January 2022, Elmas confirmed during a press conference the new manager Domènec Torrent. The same evening Torrent arrived in Istanbul to sign his new contract with the club.

On 14 January 2022, Domènec Torrent and his assistants Jordi Guerrero signed their contract with Jordi Gris Vila Florya Metin Oktay Facilities.

=== February 2022 ===
Hakan Balta, who has been serving as the Assistant Administrative Director of the Football A Team as of 8 February 2022, has been appointed as the Technical Director of the Galatasaray Under-19 Football Team.

== Club ==
=== Board of directors ===
You can see the fields of the board members by moving the pointer to the dotted field.

| Position | Staff |
|---|---|
| President | (Turkey) Burak Elmas |
| Second President | (Turkey) Ali Polat Bengiserp |
| Vice President | (Turkey) Bikem Kanık |
| Accounting Member of the Board of Directors | (Turkey) Burçak Emre Zorlu |
| Board Spokesperson | (Turkey) Mehmet Remzi Sanver |
| Board Member | (Turkey) Başak Karaca |
| Board Member | (Turkey) Turhan Özen |
| Board Member | (Turkey) Mustafa Özgür Kalelioğlu |
| Board Member | (Turkey) Özgür Işıtan Gün |
| Board Member | (Turkey) İbrahim Reha Keskin |
| Board Member | (Turkey) Ahmet Ozan Şener |
| Board Member | (Turkey) Selim Sefada |
| Board Member | (Turkey) Abdulvahap Gazi Tanrıverdi |
| Board Member | (Turkey) Mehmet Polat Kalafatoğlu |

Last updated: 19 December 2021
Source: Galatasaray.org

=== Facilities ===
| Position | Staff |
|---|---|
| Stadium | (Turkey) Nef Stadium |
| Sports Complex | (Turkey) Ali Sami Yen Sports Complex |
| Training facility | (Turkey) Florya Metin Oktay Facilities |

== Kits ==
Galatasaray's 2021–22 kits, manufactured by Nike, released on 14 July 2021 and were up for sale on the same day.

- Supplier: Nike
- Main sponsor: Sixt
- Back sponsor: Nesine.com
- Sleeve sponsor: Getir
- Short sponsor: Bitget
- Socks sponsor: Tunç Holding

Home
Away
Third
Goalkeeper 1
Goalkeeper 2
Goalkeeper 3

== Management team ==
=== Terim coaching staff (until 10 January 2022) ===
| Position | Name |
|---|---|
| Manager | (Turkey) Fatih Terim |
| Assistant coach | (Turkey) Necati Ateş |
| Assistant coach | (Turkey) Selçuk İnan |
| Goalkeeping coach | (Turkey) Fadıl Koşutan |
| Athletic performance coach | (United States) Scott Piri |
| Athletic performance coach | (Turkey) Yasin Küçük |
| Managing director | (Turkey) Şükrü Hanedar |
| Managing director assistant | (Turkey) Hakan Balta |
| Administrative manager | (Turkey) Uğur Yıldız |
| Administrative manager assistant | (Turkey) Mert Çetin |
| Media and communication | (Turkey) Eray Sözen |
| Team translator | (Turkey) Ersan Zeren |
| Match analysis officer | (Turkey) Halil Cihan Ünal |
| Computing expert | (Turkey) Olgu Şimşek |
| Doctor | (Turkey) Yener İnce |
| Dietitian | (Turkey) Mestan Hüseyin Çilekçi |
| Physiotherapist | (Turkey) Mustafa Korkmaz |
| Physiotherapist | (Turkey) Burak Koca |
| Physiotherapist | (Turkey) Samet Polat |
| Masseur | (Turkey) Sedat Peker |
| Masseur | (Turkey) Batuhan Erkan |
| Masseur | (Turkey) Ozan Abaylı |
| Outfitter | (Turkey) Hasan Çelik |
| Outfitter | (Turkey) Veli Muğlı |
| Outfitter | (Turkey) İlyas Gökçe |

Last updated: 8 January 2022.
Source: Futbol A Takım İdari ve Teknik Kadro - GALATASARAY.ORG

=== Torrent coaching staff (from 11 January 2022) ===
| Position | Name |
|---|---|
| Sporting director | (Italy) Pasquale Sensibile |
| Manager | (Spain) Domènec Torrent |
| Assistant coach | (Spain) Albert Riera |
| Assistant coach | (Spain) Jordi Gris Vila |
| Assistant coach | (Spain) Jordi Guerrero Costa |
| Goalkeeping coach | (Spain) Ricard Segarra |
| Goalkeeping coach | (Turkey) Fadıl Koşutan |
| Athletic performance coach | (Spain) Julian Jimenez |
| Athletic performance coach | (Turkey) Yasin Küçük |
| Administrative manager | (Turkey) Uğur Yıldız |
| Scouting and performance analysis manager | (Turkey) Emre Utkucan |
| Media coordinator | (Turkey) Emrah Kayalıoğlu |
| Team translator | (Turkey) Ersan Zeren |
| Team translator | (Turkey) Utku Yurtbil |
| Team doctor | (Turkey) Yener İnce |
| Dietitian | (Turkey) Mestan Hüseyin Çilekçi |
| Physiotherapist | (Turkey) Mustafa Korkmaz |
| Physiotherapist | (Turkey) Burak Koca |
| Physiotherapist | (Turkey) Samet Polat |
| Masseur | (Turkey) Sedat Peker |
| Masseur | (Turkey) Batuhan Erkan |
| Masseur | (Turkey) Ozan Abaylı |
| Outfitter | (Turkey) Hasan Çelik |
| Outfitter | (Turkey) Veli Muğlı |
| Outfitter | (Turkey) İlyas Gökçe |

Last updated: 27 February 2022.
Source: Futbol A Takım İdari ve Teknik Kadro - GALATASARAY.ORG

== Players ==
=== Squad information ===
Players and squad numbers last updated on 20 May 2022. Appearances include all competitions.
Note: Flags indicate national team as has been defined under FIFA eligibility rules. Players may hold more than one non-FIFA nationality.

| No. | Name | Nat | Position(s) | Date of birth (age) | Signed in | Contract ends | Signed from | Transfer Fee | Apps. | Goals |
Goalkeepers
| 1 | Fernando Muslera (captain) | (Uruguay) | GK | 16 June 1986 (age 40) | 2011 | 2024 | (Italy) Lazio | €6,750,000 + Cana | 421 | 1 |
| 13 | İsmail Çipe | (Turkey) | GK | 5 January 1995 (age 31) | 2016 | 2023 | Academy | Trainee | 17 | 0 |
| 23 | Iñaki Peña | (Spain) | GK | 2 March 1999 (age 27) | 2022 | 2022 | (Spain) Barcelona | Loan | 8 | 0 |
| 99 | Fatih Öztürk | (France) | GK | 22 December 1986 (age 39) | 2020 | 2022 | (Turkey) Kasımpaşa | Free | 13 | 0 |
Defenders
| 3 | Omar Elabdellaoui | (Norway) | RB | 5 December 1991 (age 34) | 2020 | 2023 | (Greece) Olympiacos | Free | 20 | 0 |
| 5 | Alpaslan Öztürk | (Turkey) | CB | 16 July 1993 (age 33) | 2021 | 2024 | (Turkey) Göztepe | Free | 16 | 1 |
| 6 | Patrick van Aanholt | (Netherlands) | LB | 29 August 1990 (age 36) | 2021 | 2024 | (England) Crystal Palace | Undisclosed | 48 | 3 |
| 19 | Ömer Bayram (4th captain) | (Turkey) | LB | 27 July 1991 (age 35) | 2018 | 2024 | (Turkey) Akhisar Belediyespor | €400,000 | 126 | 2 |
| 24 | Işık Kaan Arslan | (Turkey) | CB | 28 January 2001 (age 25) | 2017 | 2025 | Academy | Trainee | 2 | 0 |
| 25 | Victor Nelsson | (Denmark) | CB | 14 October 1998 (age 28) | 2021 | 2026 | (Denmark) Copenhagen | €7,000,000 | 45 | 1 |
| 45 | Marcão (5th captain) | (Brazil) | CB | 5 June 1996 (age 30) | 2019 | 2024 | (Portugal) Chaves | €4,000,000 | 141 | 2 |
| 88 | Semih Kaya | (Turkey) | CB | 24 February 1991 (age 35) | 2022 | 2022 | (Turkey) Yeni Malatyaspor | Free | 211 | 5 |
| 93 | Sacha Boey | (France) | RB | 13 September 2000 (age 26) | 2021 | 2025 | (France) Stade Rennais | Undisclosed | 19 | 1 |
Midfielders
| 4 | Taylan Antalyalı | (Turkey) | DM | 8 January 1995 (age 31) | 2019 | 2026 | (Turkey) BB Erzurumspor | Free | 101 | 2 |
| 7 | Kerem Aktürkoğlu | (Turkey) | LW | 21 October 1998 (age 28) | 2020 | 2026 | (Turkey) 24 Erzincanspor | Free | 81 | 19 |
| 8 | Ryan Babel | (Netherlands) | LW | 19 December 1986 (age 39) | 2019 | 2022 | (England) Fulham | Free | 100 | 17 |
| 15 | Erick Pulgar | (Chile) | DM | 15 January 1994 (age 32) | 2022 | 2022 | (Italy) Fiorentina | Loan | 11 | 0 |
| 21 | Olimpiu Moruțan | (Romania) | AM | 25 April 1999 (age 27) | 2021 | 2026 | (Romania) FCSB | €3,500,000 | 34 | 3 |
| 22 | Berkan Kutlu | (Turkey) | CM | 25 January 1998 (age 28) | 2021 | 2026 | (Turkey) Alanyaspor | Undisclosed | 48 | 0 |
| 33 | Alexandru Cicâldău | (Romania) | AM | 8 July 1997 (age 29) | 2021 | 2026 | (Romania) Universitatea Craiova | €6,500,000 | 40 | 5 |
| 53 | Barış Alper Yılmaz | (Turkey) | LW | 23 May 2000 (age 26) | 2021 | 2026 | (Turkey) Ankara Keçiörengücü | Undisclosed | 23 | 0 |
| 54 | Emre Kılınç | (Turkey) | RW | 23 August 1994 (age 32) | 2020 | 2024 | (Turkey) Sivasspor | Free | 78 | 9 |
| 63 | Bartuğ Elmaz | (Turkey) | DM | 17 February 2003 (age 23) | 2020 | 2022 | Academy | Trainee | 2 | 0 |
| 66 | Arda Turan (vice-captain) | (Turkey) | LW | 30 January 1987 (age 39) | 2020 | 2022 | (Turkey) İstanbul Başakşehir | Free | 236 | 48 |
| 89 | Sofiane Feghouli (3rd captain) | (Algeria) | RW | 26 December 1989 (age 36) | 2017 | 2022 | (England) West Ham United | €4,250,000 | 162 | 34 |
Forwards
| 11 | Mostafa Mohamed | (Egypt) | CF | 28 November 1997 (age 28) | 2021 | 2025 | (Egypt) Zamalek | $4,000,000 | 58 | 17 |
| 18 | Bafétimbi Gomis | (France) | CF | 6 August 1985 (age 41) | 2022 | 2023 | (Saudi Arabia) Al Hilal | Free | 58 | 41 |
| 67 | Halil Dervişoğlu | (Turkey) | CF | 8 December 1999 (age 26) | 2021 | 2022 | (England) Brentford | Loan | 45 | 8 |
| 90 | Mbaye Diagne | (Senegal) | CF | 28 October 1991 (age 35) | 2019 | 2023 | (Turkey) Kasımpaşa | €13,000,000 | 62 | 26 |
Player(s) on loan during this season
| 17 | Oğulcan Çağlayan | (Turkey) | RW | 22 March 1996 (age 30) | 2020 | 2024 | (Turkey) Çaykur Rizespor | Free | 29 | 4 |
| 20 | Emre Akbaba | (Turkey) | AM | 4 October 1992 (age 34) | 2018 | 2023 | (Turkey) Alanyaspor | €4,000,000 | 73 | 14 |
| 23 | Emre Taşdemir | (Turkey) | LB | 8 August 1995 (age 31) | 2019 | 2023 | (Turkey) Bursaspor | Free | 31 | 0 |
| 27 | Christian Luyindama | (Democratic Republic of the Congo) | CB | 8 January 1994 (age 32) | 2019 | 2024 | (Belgium) Standard Liège | €5,000,000 | 79 | 5 |
| 30 | Atalay Babacan | (Turkey) | AM | 28 June 2000 (age 26) | 2019 | 2023 | Academy | Trainee | 7 | 1 |
| 35 | Aytaç Kara | (Turkey) | CM | 23 March 1993 (age 33) | 2021 | 2024 | (Turkey) Kasımpaşa | Free | 12 | 0 |
| 49 | Valentine Ozornwafor | (Nigeria) | CB | 1 June 1999 (age 27) | 2019 | 2023 | (Nigeria) Enyimba | €200,000 | 1 | 0 |
| 70 | Yunus Akgün | (Turkey) | RW | 7 July 2000 (age 26) | 2018 | 2024 | Academy | Trainee | 28 | 5 |
| 77 | Jesse Sekidika | (Nigeria) | RW | 14 July 1996 (age 30) | 2020 | 2024 | (Turkey) Eskişehirspor | €200,000 | 19 | 1 |
| 80 | Ali Yavuz Kol | (Turkey) | CF | 29 January 2001 (age 25) | 2018 | 2024 | Academy | Trainee | 7 | 0 |
| 98 | Berk Balaban | (Turkey) | GK | 1 January 2000 (age 26) | 2020 | 2025 | Academy | Trainee | 1 | 0 |
Player(s) transferred out during this season
| 2 | DeAndre Yedlin | (United States) | RB | 9 July 1993 (age 33) | 2021 | 2023 | (England) Newcastle United | Free | 36 | 1 |
| 9 | Radamel Falcao | (Colombia) | CF | 10 February 1986 (age 40) | 2019 | 2022 | (France) Monaco | Free | 43 | 20 |
| 12 | Gustavo Assunção | (Brazil) | DM | 30 March 2000 (age 26) | 2021 | 2022 | (Portugal) Famalicão | Loan | 2 | 0 |

== Transfers ==
=== Contracts renewals ===
| Date | Position | No. | Player | Contract ends | Ref. |
|---|---|---|---|---|---|
| 16 June 2021 | DF | 19 | (Turkey) Ömer Bayram | 2024 | |
| 16 June 2021 | DF | 23 | (Turkey) Emre Taşdemir | 2023 | |
| 4 July 2021 | MF | 20 | (Turkey) Emre Akbaba | 2023 | |
| 6 July 2021 | MF | 66 | (Turkey) Arda Turan | 2022 | |
| 1 November 2021 | MF | 4 | (Turkey) Taylan Antalyalı | 2026 | |
| 1 November 2021 | GK | 13 | (Turkey) İsmail Çipe | 2023 | |
| 1 November 2021 | DF | 27 | (Democratic Republic of the Congo) Christian Luyindama | 2024 | |
| 2 December 2021 | MF | 7 | (Turkey) Kerem Aktürkoğlu | 2026 | |
| 27 December 2021 | FW | 11 | (Egypt) Mostafa Mohamed | 2025 | |

=== In ===
==== Summer ====
| Date | No. | Pos. | Player | From | Fee | Source |
|---|---|---|---|---|---|---|
11 June 2021
| 11 June 2021 | 5 | DF | (Turkey) Alpaslan Öztürk | (Turkey) Göztepe | Free | |
| 11 June 2021 | 35 | MF | (Turkey) Aytaç Kara | (Turkey) Kasımpaşa | Free | |
30 June 2021
| 30 June 2021 | — | GK | (Turkey) Berk Balaban | (Turkey) Ankaraspor | Loan return | |
| 30 June 2021 | — | GK | (Turkey) İsmail Çipe | (Turkey) Kayserispor | Loan return | |
| 30 June 2021 | 40 | DF | (Turkey) Emin Bayram | (Turkey) Boluspor | Loan return | |
| 30 June 2021 | — | DF | (Turkey) Gökay Güney | (Turkey) Bandırmaspor | Loan return | |
| 30 June 2021 | — | DF | (Turkey) Ercan Şirin | (Turkey) Serik Belediyespor | Loan return | |
| 30 June 2021 | — | DF | (Turkey) Süleyman Luş | (Turkey) Şanlıurfaspor | Loan return | |
| 30 June 2021 | — | DF | (Turkey) Emirhan Civelek | (Turkey) Akhisarspor | Loan return | |
| 30 June 2021 | — | MF | (Turkey) Abdussamed Karnuçu | (Turkey) Tarsus İdman Yurdu | Loan return | |
| 30 June 2021 | — | MF | (Turkey) Ferhan Evren | (Turkey) Afjet Afyonspor | Loan return | |
| 30 June 2021 | — | MF | (Turkey) Atalay Babacan | (Turkey) Adanaspor | Loan return | |
| 30 June 2021 | 60 | MF | (Turkey) Erkan Süer | (Turkey) Turgutluspor | Loan return | |
| 30 June 2021 | 21 | MF | (Sweden) (Turkey) Jimmy Durmaz | (Turkey) Fatih Karagümrük | Loan return | |
| 30 June 2021 | — | MF | (Turkey) Metehan Mertöz | (Turkey) Kırklarelispor | Loan return | |
| 30 June 2021 | 70 | MF | (Turkey) Yunus Akgün | (Turkey) Adana Demirspor | Loan return | |
| 30 June 2021 | 77 | MF | (Nigeria) Jesse Sekidika | (Turkey) Konyaspor | Loan return | |
| 30 June 2021 | 90 | FW | (Senegal) Mbaye Diagne | (England) West Bromwich Albion | Loan return | |
| 30 June 2021 | 80 | FW | (Turkey) Ali Yavuz Kol | (Turkey) Denizlispor | Loan return | |
| 9 July 2021 | 53 | MF | (Turkey) Barış Alper Yılmaz | (Turkey) Ankara Keçiörengücü | Undisclosed | |
| 24 July 2021 | 33 | MF | (Romania) Alexandru Cicâldău | (Romania) Universitatea Craiova | €6,500,000 | |
| 26 July 2021 | 93 | DF | (France) Sacha Boey | (France) Stade Rennais | Undisclosed | |
| 28 July 2021 | 6 | DF | (Netherlands) Patrick van Aanholt | (England) Crystal Palace | Undisclosed | |
| 29 July 2021 | 22 | MF | (Turkey) Berkan Kutlu | (Turkey) Alanyaspor | Undisclosed | |
| 11 August 2021 | 25 | DF | (Denmark) Victor Nelsson | (Denmark) Copenhagen | €7,000,000 | |
| 25 August 2021 | 21 | MF | (Romania) Olimpiu Moruțan | (Romania) FCSB | €3,500,000 | |

==== Winter ====
| Date | No. | Pos. | Player | From | Fee | Source |
|---|---|---|---|---|---|---|
| 2 February 2022 | 18 | FW | (France) Bafétimbi Gomis | (Saudi Arabia) Al Hilal | Free | |
| 3 February 2022 | 88 | DF | (Turkey) Semih Kaya | (Turkey) Yeni Malatyaspor | Free | |

=== Loan in ===
==== Summer ====
| Date | No. | Pos. | Player | From | Fee | Source |
|---|---|---|---|---|---|---|
| 1 September 2021 | 67 | FW | (Turkey) Halil Dervişoğlu | (England) Brentford | Undisclosed | |
| 8 September 2021 | 12 | MF | (Brazil) Gustavo Assunção | (Portugal) Famalicão | Undisclosed | |

==== Winter ====
| Date | No. | Pos. | Player | From | Fee | Source |
|---|---|---|---|---|---|---|
| 31 January 2022 | 23 | GK | (Spain) Iñaki Peña | (Spain) Barcelona | Free | |
| 3 February 2022 | 15 | MF | (Chile) Erick Pulgar | (Italy) Fiorentina | Free | |

=== Out ===
==== Summer ====
| Date | No. | Pos. | Player | To | Fee | Source |
|---|---|---|---|---|---|---|
| 30 June 2021 | 7 | MF | (Nigeria) Henry Onyekuru | (France) Monaco | Loan return | |
| 30 June 2021 | 11 | FW | (Turkey) Halil Dervişoğlu | (England) Brentford | Loan return | |
| 30 June 2021 | 13 | MF | (Nigeria) Peter Etebo | (England) Stoke City | Loan return | |
| 30 June 2021 | 36 | DF | (Uruguay) Marcelo Saracchi | (Germany) RB Leipzig | Loan return | |
| 30 June 2021 | 83 | MF | (Portugal) Gedson Fernandes | (Portugal) Benfica | Loan return | |
| 30 June 2021 | 2 | DF | (Turkey) Şener Özbayraklı | (Turkey) İstanbul Başakşehir | End of contract | |
| 30 June 2021 | 14 | DF | (Norway) Martin Linnes | (Norway) Molde | End of contract | |
| 30 June 2021 | 15 | DF | (Suriname) Ryan Donk | (Turkey) Kasımpaşa | End of contract | |
| 9 July 2021 | — | DF | (Turkey) Emirhan Civelek | (Turkey) İskenderunspor | Free | |
| 11 July 2021 | — | MF | (Turkey) Metehan Mertöz | (Turkey) Eyüpspor | Free | |
| 4 August 2021 | 21 | MF | (Sweden) (Turkey) Jimmy Durmaz | (Turkey) Fatih Karagümrük | Free | |
| 1 September 2021 | 9 | FW | (Colombia) Radamel Falcao | (Spain) Rayo Vallecano | Contract termination | |

==== Winter ====
| Date | No. | Pos. | Player | To | Fee | Source |
|---|---|---|---|---|---|---|
| 21 January 2022 | 12 | MF | (Brazil) Gustavo Assunção | (Portugal) Famalicão | Contract termination | |
| 26 January 2022 | 2 | DF | (United States) DeAndre Yedlin | (United States) Inter Miami | Contract termination | |

=== Loan out ===
==== Summer ====
| Date | Until | No. | Pos. | Player | To | Fee | Source |
|---|---|---|---|---|---|---|---|
| 2 July 2021 | End of season | — | DF | (Turkey) Süleyman Luş | (Turkey) Bandırmaspor | Undisclosed | |
| 9 July 2021 | End of season | 34 | GK | (Turkey) Okan Kocuk | (Turkey) Giresunspor | Undisclosed | |
| 10 July 2021 | End of season | — | MF | (Turkey) Abdussamed Karnuçu | (Turkey) Tuzlaspor | Undisclosed | |
| 12 July 2021 | End of season | — | DF | (Turkey) Emin Bayram | (Turkey) Boluspor | Undisclosed | |
| 3 August 2021 | End of season | 88 | DF | (Turkey) Gökay Güney | (Turkey) Bandırmaspor | Undisclosed | |
| 19 August 2021 | End of season | 23 | DF | (Turkey) Emre Taşdemir | (Turkey) Giresunspor | Undisclosed | |
| 21 August 2021 | End of season | 49 | DF | (Nigeria) Valentine Ozornwafor | (Belgium) Sporting Charleroi | Undisclosed | |
| 27 August 2021 | End of season | 77 | MF | (Nigeria) Jesse Sekidika | (Belgium) OH Leuven | Undisclosed | |
| 27 August 2021 | End of season | 80 | FW | (Turkey) Ali Yavuz Kol | (Turkey) Ankara Keçiörengücü | Undisclosed | |
| 6 September 2021 | End of season | 20 | MF | (Turkey) Emre Akbaba | (Turkey) Alanyaspor | Undisclosed | |
| 6 September 2021 | End of season | 70 | MF | (Turkey) Yunus Akgün | (Turkey) Adana Demirspor | Undisclosed | |
| 7 September 2021 | End of season | 60 | MF | (Turkey) Erkan Süer | (Turkey) Uşakspor | Undisclosed | |

==== Winter ====
| Date | Until | No. | Pos. | Player | To | Fee | Source |
|---|---|---|---|---|---|---|---|
| 26 January 2022 | End of season | 30 | MF | (Turkey) Atalay Babacan | (Turkey) Ümraniyespor | Undisclosed | |
| 30 January 2022 | End of season | 27 | DF | (Democratic Republic of the Congo) Christian Luyindama | (Saudi Arabia) Al-Taawoun | Undisclosed | |
| 1 February 2022 | End of season | 77 | MF | (Nigeria) Jesse Sekidika | (Turkey) Eyüpspor | Undisclosed | |
| 4 February 2022 | End of season | 35 | MF | (Turkey) Aytaç Kara | (Turkey) Göztepe | Undisclosed | |
| 8 February 2022 | End of season | 17 | MF | (Turkey) Oğulcan Çağlayan | (Turkey) Eyüpspor | Undisclosed | |
| 8 February 2022 | End of season | 98 | GK | (Turkey) Berk Balaban | (Turkey) Niğde Anadolu | Undisclosed | |

=== Overall transfer activity ===
==== Expenditure ====
Summer: ▼

Winter: ▼

Total: ▼

==== Income ====
Summer: ▲

Winter: ▲

Total: ▲

==== Net totals ====
Summer: ▼

Winter:

Total: ▼

== Pre-season and friendlies ==
Win Draw Loss Fixtures

=== Pre-season ===
| 27 June 2021 Friendly | Galatasaray (Turkey) | 2–1 | (Romania) Dinamo București | Florya, Istanbul, Turkey |
| 18:00 CEST | Kara 36', 62' (pen.) | Report | Nemec 49' | Stadium: Florya Metin Oktay Facilities; Attendance: 0 Referee: Mustafa Kürşad Filiz |
Note: The match was played behind closed doors.

| 10 July 2021 Friendly | Galatasaray (Turkey) | 4–2 | (Turkey) Kasımpaşa | Esenyurt, Istanbul, Turkey |
| 19:00 CEST | Bayram 18'; Çağlayan 23'; Kara 45'; Akbaba 83' | Report | Břečka 14'; Engin 80' (pen.) | Stadium: Necmi Kadıoğlu Stadium; Attendance: 0 Referee: Burak Taşkınsoy |
Note: The match was played behind closed doors.

| 13 July 2021 Friendly | Olympiacos (Greece) | Cancelled | (Turkey) Galatasaray | Piraeus, Attica, Greece |
| 21:15 CEST | | | | Stadium: Karaiskakis Stadium |

| 5 September 2021 Friendly | Galatasaray (Turkey) | 1–3 | (Romania) Farul Constanța | Florya, Istanbul, Turkey |
| 11:00 CEST | de Nooijer 30' (o.g.) | Report | Betancor 84'; Fernandes 87'; Ganea 90+3' (pen.) | Stadium: Florya Metin Oktay Facilities; Attendance: 0 |
Note: The match was played behind closed doors.

| 9 October 2021 Friendly | Galatasaray (Turkey) | 4–3 | (Turkey) Tuzlaspor | Florya, Istanbul, Turkey |
| 16:00 CEST | Babel 7'; Çağlayan 18'; Bayram 55'; Diagne 66' | Report | Şahintürk 36'; Yazar 50'; Kınalı 86' | Stadium: Florya Metin Oktay Facilities |

| 12 October 2021 Friendly | Galatasaray (Turkey) | 3–3 | (Turkey) İstanbulspor | Florya, Istanbul, Turkey |
| 16:00 CEST | Diagne 25' (pen.) 44'; Babel 90' (pen.) | Report | Öztürk 11'; Rroca 40' (pen.); Gültekin 85' | Stadium: Florya Metin Oktay Facilities |

| 13 November 2021 Friendly | Galatasaray (Turkey) | 5–2 | (Turkey) Bursaspor | Florya, Istanbul, Turkey |
| 14:00 CEST | Diagne 4', 17', 44'; Çağlayan 8'; Bayram 59' | Report | Yüksek 29'; Acolatse 38' | Stadium: Florya Metin Oktay Facilities |

=== Mid-season ===
| 28 January 2022 Friendly | Galatasaray (Turkey) | 2–6 | (Turkey) Tuzlaspor | Sarıyer, Istanbul, Turkey |
| 14:00 CEST | Kurt 15' (o.g.); Bayram 66' | Report | Ezeh 20', 28', 50'; Kurt 59'; Şahintürk 78'; Bardhi 83' | Stadium: Türk Telekom Stadium |

| 14 April 2022 Global Tour for Peace | Galatasaray (Turkey) | 1–3 | (Ukraine) Dynamo Kyiv | Sarıyer, Istanbul, Turkey |
| 17:00 CEST | Yılmaz 56' | Report | Buyalskyi 14'; Besedin 28'; Tsygankov 80' | Stadium: Türk Telekom Stadium; Attendance: 6,493 |

== Competitions ==
=== Overall record ===
| Competition | First match | Last match | Starting round | Final position | Record | | | | | | | |
| Competition | First match | Last match | Starting round | Final position | Pld | W | D | L | GF | GA | GD | Win % |
|---|---|---|---|---|---|---|---|---|---|---|---|---|
| Süper Lig | 16 August 2021 | 20 May 2022 | Matchday 1 | 13th | 38 | 14 | 10 | 14 | 51 | 53 | −2 | 36.84 |
| Turkish Cup | 28 December 2021 | 28 December 2021 | Fifth round | Fifth round | 1 | 0 | 1 | 0 | 3 | 3 | +0 | 0.00 |
| Champions League | 21 July 2021 | 28 July 2021 | Second qualifying round | Second qualifying round | 2 | 0 | 0 | 2 | 2 | 7 | −5 | 0.00 |
| UEFA Europa League | 5 August 2021 | 17 March 2022 | Third qualifying round | Round of 16 | 12 | 5 | 6 | 1 | 16 | 10 | +6 | 41.67 |
| Total | | | | | 53 | 19 | 17 | 17 | 72 | 73 | −1 | 35.85 |

Last updated: 22 May 2022
Source: Soccerway

=== Süper Lig ===
==== League table ====
| Pos | Team | Pld | W | D | L | GF | GA | GD | Pts |
|---|---|---|---|---|---|---|---|---|---|
| 11 | Kasımpaşa | 38 | 15 | 8 | 15 | 67 | 57 | +10 | 53 (Note: Kasımpaşa finished ahead of Hatayspor on head-to-head points: Hatayspor 1–1 Kasımpaşa, Kasımpaşa 3–1 Hatayspor.) |
| 12 | Hatayspor | 38 | 15 | 8 | 15 | 56 | 60 | −4 | 53 |
| 13 | Galatasaray | 38 | 14 | 10 | 14 | 51 | 53 | −2 | 52 |
| 14 | Kayserispor | 38 | 12 | 11 | 15 | 54 | 61 | −7 | 47 |
| 15 | Gaziantep | 38 | 12 | 10 | 16 | 48 | 56 | −8 | 46 |

Source: Süper Lig
Rules for classification: 1) Points; 2) Head-to-head points; 3) Head-to-head goal difference; 4) Head-to-head goals scored; 5) Goal difference; 6) Goals scored; 7) Play-off.

==== Results summary ====
| Overall | | | | | | | | Home | | | | | | Away | | | | | |
| Pld | W | D | L | GF | GA | GD | Pts | W | D | L | GF | GA | GD | W | D | L | GF | GA | GD |
|---|---|---|---|---|---|---|---|---|---|---|---|---|---|---|---|---|---|---|---|
| 38 | 14 | 10 | 14 | 51 | 53 | −2 | 52 | 10 | 3 | 6 | 31 | 23 | +8 | 4 | 7 | 8 | 20 | 30 | −10 |

Last updated: 20 May 2022.
Source: Competitive matches

==== Results by round ====
| Round | 1 | 2 | 3 | 4 | 5 | 6 | 7 | 8 | 9 | 10 | 11 | 12 | 13 | 14 | 15 | 16 | 17 | 18 | 19 | 20 | 21 | 22 | 23 | 24 | 25 | 26 | 27 | 28 | 29 | 30 | 31 | 32 | 33 | 34 | 35 | 36 | 37 | 38 |
|---|---|---|---|---|---|---|---|---|---|---|---|---|---|---|---|---|---|---|---|---|---|---|---|---|---|---|---|---|---|---|---|---|---|---|---|---|---|---|
| Ground | A | H | A | A | H | A | H | A | H | A | H | A | H | A | H | A | H | A | H | H | A | H | H | A | H | A | H | A | H | A | H | A | H | A | H | A | H | A |
| Result | W | W | D | D | L | L | W | W | W | L | W | D | L | D | D | L | D | L | W | L | L | L | L | D | D | W | W | L | W | L | W | L | W | W | L | D | W | D |
| Position | 4 | 3 | 4 | 5 | 9 | 11 | 10 | 8 | 6 | 8 | 6 | 4 | 8 | 8 | 7 | 9 | 11 | 12 | 10 | 12 | 13 | 13 | 15 | 13 | 13 | 13 | 12 | 12 | 11 | 15 | 13 | 14 | 12 | 12 | 13 | 13 | 11 | 13 |

Updated to match(es) played on 22 May 2022. Source: Competitive matches
A = Away; H = Home; W = Win; D = Draw; L = Loss

==== Matches ====
| 16 August 2021 1 | Giresunspor | 0–2 | Galatasaray | Giresun |
| 21:45 TRT | Tut (red card) 45' | Report | Antalyalı (yellow card) 11'; Diagne 30' (penalty missed); Cicâldău 45+1' (pen.); Marcão (red card) 64'; Luyindama (yellow card) 89' | Stadium: Çotanak Sports Complex; Attendance: 3,713; Referee: Erkan Özdamar; Assistant referees: Erdinç Sezertam, Sekan Çimen; Fourth official: Alper Çetin |

| 23 August 2021 2 | Galatasaray | 2–1 | Hatayspor | Başakşehir, Istanbul |
| 21:45 TRT | Luyindama (yellow card) 2' (goal) 88'; Feghouli 30' | Report | Lobzhanidze 3'; Ribeiro (yellow card) 22'; Falette (yellow card) 82' | Stadium: Atatürk Olympic Stadium; Referee: Hüseyin Göçek; Assistant referees: Mustafa Emre Eyisoy, Mehmet Kısal; Fourth official: Onur Özütoprak |

| 29 August 2021 3 | Kasımpaşa | 2–2 | Galatasaray | Istanbul |
| 19:15 TRT | Jørgensen 45+2'; Bozok 66'; Sadiku (yellow card) 71'; Eysseric (yellow card) 90+2' | Report | Cicâldău 32'; Aktürkoğlu 38' | Stadium: Recep Tayyip Erdoğan Stadium; Referee: Fırat Aydınus; Assistant referees: Aleks Taşcıoğlu, Erdem Bayık; Fourth official: Çağdaş Altay |

| 12 September 2021 4 | Trabzonspor | 2–2 | Galatasaray | Trabzon |
| 20:00 TRT | Özdemir (yellow card) 36'; Cornelius 41'; Nwakaeme 62'; Ié (yellow card) 62' | Report | Kılınç 20', 33'; Kutlu (yellow card) 5' | Stadium: Şenol Güneş Sports Complex; Attendance: 13,426; Referee: Ali Palabıyık; Assistant referees: Mustafa Emre Eyisoy, Ceyhun Sesigüzel; Fourth official: Ali Şansalan |

| 19 September 2021 5 | Galatasaray | 0–1 | Alanyaspor | Sarıyer, Istanbul |
| 16:00 TRT | | Report | Akbaba (yellow card) 40'; Diédhiou (yellow card) 48'; Aksoy (yellow card) 55'; Kırıntılı (yellow card) 83'; Candeias 87'; Karaca (yellow card) 89' | Stadium: Türk Telekom Stadium; Attendance: 12,963; Referee: Abdulkadir Bitigen; Assistant referees: Esat Sancaktar, Mustafa Savranlar; Fourth official: Kutluhan Bilgiç |

| 22 September 2021 6 | Kayserispor | 3–0 | Galatasaray | Kayseri |
| 20:00 TRT | Hosseini (yellow card) 30'; Thiam 39', 53' (pen.); Başsan 45'; Lung Jr. (yellow card) 75'; Akdağ (yellow card) 86' | Report | Çağlayan (yellow card) 37'; Assunção (yellow card) 59'; Diagne (yellow card) 90+4' | Stadium: Kadir Has Stadium; Attendance: 5,981; Referee: Yaşar Kemal Uğurlu; Assistant referees: Serkan Çimen, Ali Saygın Ögel; Fourth official: Kadir Sağlam |

| 26 September 2021 7 | Galatasaray | 2–1 | Göztepe | Sarıyer, Istanbul |
| 19:00 TRT | Dervişoğlu 49' (yellow card) 62'; Moruțan 56'; Cicâldău (yellow card) 83'; van Aanholt (yellow card) 88' | Report | Ndiaye 43' | Stadium: Türk Telekom Stadium; Attendance: 11,301; Referee: Ali Şansalan; Assistant referees: Kerem Ersoy, Hakan Yemişken; Fourth official: Mustafa Kürşad Filiz |

| 3 October 2021 8 | Çaykur Rizespor | 2–3 | Galatasaray | Rize |
| 19:00 TRT | Pohjanpalo 17', 26'; Sabo (yellow card) 37'; Ay (yellow card) 57'; Bolasie (yellow card) 67'; Boldrin (penalty missed); Çetin (yellow card) 90+5' | Report | Mohamed 5', 75' (yellow card) 42'; Öztürk (yellow card) 32'; Muslera (yellow card) 40'; Bayram (yellow card) 65'; Kutlu (red card) 86'; Moruțan 90+10' | Stadium: Yeni Rize Şehir Stadium; Attendance: 3,086; Referee: Ali Palabıyık; Assistant referees: Serkan Olguncan, Mustafa Sönmez; Fourth official: Sarper Barış Saka |

| 17 October 2021 9 | Galatasaray | 1–0 | Konyaspor | Sarıyer, Istanbul |
| 16:00 TRT | Mohamed 5'; Antalyalı (yellow card) 10'; Babel (yellow card) 76'; Kılınç (yellow card) 84' | Report | Šehić (yellow card) 7'; Bytyqi (yellow card) 53' | Stadium: Nef Stadium; Attendance: 20,317; Referee: Arda Kardeşler; Assistant referees: Abdullah Bora Özkara, Volkan Ahmet Narinç; Fourth official: Burak Şeker |

| 25 October 2021 10 | Beşiktaş | 2–1 | Galatasaray | Beşiktaş, Istanbul |
| 20:00 TRT | Larin 39', 64'; Ghezzal (yellow card) 41'; Teixeira (yellow card) 75'; Destanoğlu (yellow card) 90+4' | Report | Cicâldău 35'; Antalyalı (yellow card) 48'; Marcão (yellow card) 70'; Mohamed (penalty missed) | Stadium: Vodafone Park; Attendance: 21,058; Referee: Fırat Aydınus; Assistant referees: Aleks Taşcıoğlu, Erdem Bayık; Fourth official: Alper Ulusoy |

| 31 October 2021 11 | Galatasaray | 2–0 | Gaziantep | Sarıyer, Istanbul |
| 19:00 TRT | Moruțan 45+2'; Aktürkoğlu 72'; Nelsson (yellow card) 76' | Report | Maxim (yellow card) 25'; Ersoy (yellow card) 52'; Soyalp (yellow card) 79' | Stadium: Nef Stadium; Attendance: 16,097; Referee: Yaşar Kemal Uğurlu; Assistant referees: İbrahim Çağlar Uyarcan, Serkan Çimen; Fourth official: Turgut Doman |

| 7 November 2021 12 | Fatih Karagümrük | 1–1 | Galatasaray | Istanbul |
| 16:00 TRT | Pešić (yellow card) 35'; Bertolacci 68' (yellow card) 69'; Biglia (yellow card) 77'; Durmaz (yellow card) 82'; Erkin (yellow card) 83'; Ugur (yellow card) 90+2' | Report | Kutlu (yellow card) 47'; Aktürkoğlu (yellow card) 65'; Mohamed 88'; Nelsson (yellow card) 90+6' | Stadium: Atatürk Olympic Stadium; Attendance: 1,442; Referee: Atilla Karaoğlan; Assistant referees: Kerem Ersoy, Deniz Caner Özaral; Fourth official: Bahattin Şimşek |

| 21 November 2021 13 | Galatasaray | 1–2 | Fenerbahçe | Sarıyer, Istanbul |
| 19:00 TRT | Aktürkoğlu 16'; Kutlu (yellow card) 25'; Muslera (yellow card) 34'; Marcão (yellow card) 34'; Nelsson (yellow card) 65'; Bayram (yellow card) 90+6' | Report | Tisserand (yellow card) 24' (yellow-red card) 82'; Özil 31'; Yandaş (yellow card) 34'; Özer (yellow card) 34'; Crespo 90+4'; Kahveci (yellow card) 90+6'; Szalai (yellow card) 90+6' | Stadium: Nef Stadium; Attendance: 47,678; Referee: Halil Umut Meler; Assistant referees: Mustafa Emre Eyisoy, İbrahim Çağlar Uyarcan; Fourth official: Erkan Özdamar |

| 28 November 2021 14 | Yeni Malatyaspor | 0–0 | Galatasaray | Malatya |
| 19:00 TRT | Nshimirimana (yellow card) 20'; Çiftpınar (yellow card) 69'; Mallan (yellow card) 83'; Hafez (yellow card) 85'; Kanatsızkuş (yellow card) 90+5' | Report | Aktürkoğlu (yellow card) 58'; Feghouli (yellow card) 88' | Stadium: New Malatya Stadium; Attendance: 6,081; Referee: Atilla Karaoğlan; Assistant referees: Samet Çavuş, Osman Gökhan Bilir; Fourth official: Yasin Kol |

| 4 December 2021 15 | Galatasaray | 2–2 | Altay | Sarıyer, Istanbul |
| 19:00 TRT | Yedlin (yellow card) 11'; Dervişoğlu 35'; Muslera (yellow card) 65'; Diagne 80' | Report | Pinares 18' (yellow card) 20'; Karayel (yellow card) 50'; Yıldırım (yellow card) 65'; Bamba 86' (pen.) (yellow card) 90+6' | Stadium: Nef Stadium; Attendance: 15,318; Referee: Cüneyt Çakır; Assistant referees: Bahattin Duran, Tarık Ongun; Fourth official: Volkan Bayarslan |

| 13 December 2021 16 | Sivasspor | 1–0 | Galatasaray | Sivas |
| 18:00 TRT | Fajr (yellow card) 25' (goal) 80'; Erdal (yellow card) 45+2'; Gradel (yellow card) 66'; Vural (yellow card) 66'; Oğuz (yellow card) 87' | Report | Cicâldău (yellow card) 37'; Luyindama (yellow card) 62'; Yedlin (yellow card) 66' | Stadium: New Sivas 4 Eylül Stadium; Attendance: 7,618; Referee: Ümit Öztürk; Assistant referees: Kerem Ersoy, Samet Çiçek; Fourth official: Bülent Birincioğlu |

| 18 December 2021 17 | Galatasaray | 1–1 | İstanbul Başakşehir | Sarıyer, Istanbul |
| 19:00 | Aktürkoğlu (yellow card) 21'; Marcão (yellow card) 23'; Yedlin (yellow card) 30'; Mohamed 88'; Cicâldău (yellow card) 90+5' | Report | Okaka 20' (yellow card) 90+5'; Chadli (yellow card) 35'; Ndayishimiye (yellow card) 87'; Gulbrandsen (yellow card) 90+1'; Duarte (yellow card) 90+4' (yellow-red card) 90+4'; Şengezer (yellow card) 90+6' | Stadium: Nef Stadium; Attendance: 15,204; Referee: Zorbay Küçük; Assistant referees: Ali Saygın Ögel, Candaş Elbil; Fourth official: Burak Şeker |

| 21 December 2021 18 | Adana Demirspor | 2–0 | Galatasaray | Sarıçam, Adana |
| 20:00 | Stambouli (yellow card) 8'; Bjarnason (yellow card) 43'; Akgün 53', 58'; Muric (yellow card) 86' | Report | Cicâldău (yellow card) 2'; Antalyalı (yellow card) 32' | Stadium: New Adana Stadium; Attendance: 24,126; Referee: Arda Kardeşler; Assistant referees: Abdullah Bora Özkara, Erdinç Sezertam; Fourth official: Turgut Doman |

| 25 December 2021 19 | Galatasaray | 2–0 | Antalyaspor | Sarıyer, Istanbul |
| 16:00 | Kara (yellow card) 28'; Feghouli 45+1'; Marcão (yellow card) 49'; Aktürkoğlu 52' (yellow card) 78'; Çağlayan (yellow card) 90+5' | Report | Naldo (yellow card) 21'; Sarı (yellow card) 55'; Milošević (yellow card) 84' | Stadium: Nef Stadium; Attendance: 10,150; Referee: Ali Şansalan; Assistant referees: Volkan Ahmet Narinç, Samet Çavuş; Fourth official: Abdullah Buğra Taşkınsoy |

| 8 January 2022 20 | Galatasaray | 0–1 | Giresunspor | Sarıyer, Istanbul |
| 19:00 | Kara (yellow card) 59'; Nelsson (yellow card) 86' | Report | Suleymanov 11' | Stadium: Nef Stadium; Attendance: 21,802; Referee: Arda Kardeşler; Assistant referees: Cevdet Kömürcüoğlu, Mehmet Emin Tuğral; Fourth official: Kadir Sağlam |

| 16 January 2022 21 | Hatayspor | 4–2 | Galatasaray | Antakya |
| 19:00 | Adekugbe (yellow card) 25'; Saint-Louis (yellow card) 27'; Kamara (yellow card) 37' (goal) 63'; Diouf 43' (pen.); Kuruçuk (yellow card) 68'; Lobzhanidze 79', 90'; Ribeiro (yellow card) 82' | Report | Öztürk (yellow card) 14'; Kılınç 23'; Kutlu (yellow card) 24'; van Aanholt (penalty missed); Boey (yellow card) 37'; Bayram (yellow card) 45'; Aktürkoğlu 45+7'; Dervişoğlu (yellow card) 47'; Antalyalı (red card) 82' | Stadium: New Hatay Stadium; Attendance: 11,751; Referee: Erkan Özdamar; Assistant referees: Aleks Taşcıoğlu, Erdem Bayık; Fourth official: Cihan Aydın |

| 20 January 2022 22 | Galatasaray | 1–3 | Kasımpaşa | Sarıyer, Istanbul |
| 20:00 | Dervişoğlu 39' | Report | Donk 45+3'; Trávník (yellow card) 52'; Bozok 60'; Varga 90+3' | Stadium: Nef Stadium; Attendance: 10,616; Referee: Tugay Kaan Numanoğlu; Assistant referees: Samet Çiçek, Ata Yıldırım; Fourth official: Kadir Sağlam |

| 23 January 2022 23 | Galatasaray | 1–2 | Trabzonspor | Sarıyer, Istanbul |
| 19:00 | Cicâldău 31' (pen.); Öztürk (yellow card) 58'; Marcão (yellow card) 79' | Report | Çakır (yellow card) 30'; Denswil (yellow card) 30'; Peres (yellow card) 41'; Bakasetas 84'; Višća 90'; Mallı (yellow card) 90+2' | Stadium: Nef Stadium; Attendance: 18,677; Referee: Atilla Karaoğlan; Assistant referees: Bahattin Duran, Tarık Ongun; Fourth official: Onur Özütoprak |

| 6 February 2022 24 | Alanyaspor | 1–1 | Galatasaray | Alanya, Antalya |
| 16:00 | Eduardo 39'; Juanfran (red card) 72' | Report | Aktürkoğlu 41'; Pulgar (yellow card) 86' | Stadium: Bahçeşehir Okulları Stadium; Attendance: 4,013; Referee: Mete Kalkavan; Assistant referees: Ekrem Kan, Ata Yıldırım; Fourth official: Turgut Doman |

| 12 February 2022 25 | Galatasaray | 1–1 | Kayserispor | Sarıyer, Istanbul |
| 19:00 | Mohamed 85'; Marcão (yellow card) 90+5' | Report | Cardoso 69'; Bayazit (yellow card) 90+2' | Stadium: Nef Stadium; Attendance: 21,802; Referee: Sarper Barış Saka; Assistant referees: Kerem Ersoy, İbrahim Bozbey; Fourth official: Bülent Birincioğlu |

| 21 February 2022 26 | Göztepe | 2–3 | Galatasaray | Konak, İzmir |
| 20:00 | Arslanagić (yellow card) 7'; Ndiaye 45+1' (pen.), 70' (pen.); Jahović (yellow card) 82'; Emir (yellow card) 90+6' | Report | Nelsson 3' (yellow card) 90+5'; Mohamed (yellow card) 33'; Gomis 87' (pen.), 90+9' (pen.) (yellow card) 90+9' | Stadium: Gürsel Aksel Stadium; Attendance: 18,228; Referee: Arda Kardeşler; Assistant referees: Esat Sancaktar, Bahtiyar Birinci; Fourth official: Abdullah Buğra Taşkınsoy |

| 27 February 2022 27 | Galatasaray | 4–2 | Çaykur Rizespor | Sarıyer, Istanbul |
| 19:00 | Elabdellaoui (yellow card) 19'; Kılınç (yellow card) 26'; Mohamed (yellow card) 37'; van Aanholt 41', 87'; Gomis (penalty missed) 90+8'; Babel 70' (pen.); Aktürkoğlu (yellow card) 83'; Antalyalı (yellow card) 90+2'; Peña (yellow card) 90+4' | Report | Fernandes 8'; Ponck (yellow card) 9'; Holmén (yellow card) 43'; Boyd 49'; Boldrin (yellow card) 63'; Baiano (yellow card) 90+1' (yellow-red card) 90+3' | Stadium: Nef Stadium; Attendance: 35,054; Referee: Ümit Öztürk; Assistant referees: Erdinç Sezertam, Osman Gökhan Bilir; Fourth official: Emre Kargın |

| 5 March 2022 28 | Konyaspor | 2–0 | Galatasaray | Selçuklu, Konya |
| 19:00 | Hassan 7'; Rahmanović 21' | Report | | Stadium: Konya Metropolitan Municipality Stadium; Attendance: 23,483; Referee: Ali Şansalan; Assistant referees: Ekrem Kan, İlker Takpak; Fourth official: Ozan Ergün |

| 14 March 2022 29 | Galatasaray | 2–1 | Beşiktaş | Sarıyer, Istanbul |
| 20:00 | Aktürkoğlu 22', 33'; Cicâldău (yellow card) 48'; Mohamed (yellow card) 67'; Bayram (yellow card) 86'; van Aanholt (yellow card) 90+5' | Report | Hutchinson (yellow card) 31'; Ghezzal (yellow card) 34'; Destanoğlu (yellow card) 34'; Souza (yellow card) 64'; Yılmaz 85' | Stadium: Nef Stadium; Attendance: 41,130; Referee: Atilla Karaoğlan; Assistant referees: Serkan Ok, Candaş Elbil; Fourth official: Mustafa Kürşad Filiz |

| 20 March 2022 30 | Gaziantep | 3–1 | Galatasaray | Şehitkamil, Gaziantep |
| 16:00 | Djilobodji 45+3'; Maxim 72' (pen.); Figueiredo 81' | Report | Moruțan (yellow card) 22'; Gomis 34' (yellow card) 45+3'; Kılınç (yellow card) 66' | Stadium: Gaziantep Stadium; Referee: Arda Kardeşler; Assistant referees: Ali Saygın Ögel, Yusuf Bozdoğan; Fourth official: Yiğit Arslan |

| 2 April 2022 31 | Galatasaray | 2–0 | Fatih Karagümrük | Sarıyer, Istanbul |
| 20:30 | Gomis 4' (pen.); Babel 12'; Nelsson (yellow card) 43' | Report | Dursun (yellow card) 45+2'; Luckassen (yellow card) 68'; Pešić (penalty missed) | Stadium: Nef Stadium; Attendance: 27,506; Referee: Ali Şansalan; Assistant referees: Mehmet Kısal, Murat Ergin Gözütok; Fourth official: Adem Cinek |

| 10 April 2022 32 | Fenerbahçe | 2–0 | Galatasaray | Kadıköy, Istanbul |
| 20:30 | Zajc 26'; Aziz (yellow card) 33'; Yandaş (yellow card) 55'; Kahveci (yellow card) 62'; Dursun 68' | Report | Marcão (yellow card) 39'; Babel (yellow card) 45'; Cicâldău (yellow card) 58'; Antalyalı (yellow card) 90+2' | Stadium: Şükrü Saracoğlu Stadium; Attendance: 43,878; Referee: Atilla Karaoğlan; Assistant referees: Kerem Ersoy, Aleks Taşcıoğlu; Fourth official: Onur Özütoprak |

| 18 April 2022 33 | Galatasaray | 2–0 | Yeni Malatyaspor | Sarıyer, Istanbul |
| 20:30 | Babel (yellow card) 34' (goal) 52'; Dervişoğlu 54' | Report | Awuku (yellow card) 16'; Dicko (yellow card) 70' | Stadium: Nef Stadium; Attendance: 18,447; Referee: Mustafa Kürşad Filiz; Assistant referees: Esat Sancaktar, İbrahim Bozbey; Fourth official: Direnç Tonusluoğlu |

| 24 April 2022 34 | Altay | 0–1 | Galatasaray | Konak, İzmir |
| 20:30 | Poko (yellow card) 28'; Rodríguez (yellow card) 45+1'; Pinares (yellow card) 90+1' | Report | Aktürkoğlu 8'; Pulgar (yellow card) 51'; Marcão (yellow card) 55'; van Aanholt (yellow card) 56'; Elabdellaoui (yellow card) 58' | Stadium: Alsancak Mustafa Denizli Stadium; Attendance: 10,059; Referee: Volkan Bayarslan; Assistant referees: Samet Çiçek, Yusuf Bozdoğan; Fourth official: Turgut Doman |

| 1 May 2022 35 | Galatasaray | 2–3 | Sivasspor | Sarıyer, Istanbul |
| 20:30 | Gomis 10' 58' (pen.); Kılınç (yellow card) 16'; Boey (yellow card) 30' | Report | Fajr (yellow card) 30'; Yatabaré 44'; Ulvestad 49' (yellow card) 51'; Appindangoyé (yellow card) 61'; Oğuz 65' (yellow card) 77' | Stadium: Nef Stadium; Attendance: 28,164; Referee: Kadir Sağlam; Assistant referees: Erdinç Sezertam, Mustafa Sönmez; Fourth official: Abdullah Buğra Taşkınsoy |

| 7 May 2022 36 | İstanbul Başakşehir | 0–0 | Galatasaray | Başakşehir, Istanbul |
| 19:00 | | Report | | Stadium: Başakşehir Fatih Terim Stadium; Attendance: 3,717; Referee: Fırat Aydınus; Assistant referees: Erdem Bayık, Özgür Ertem; Fourth official: Mert Güzenge |

| 16 May 2022 37 | Galatasaray | 3–2 | Adana Demirspor | Sarıyer, Istanbul |
| 20:00 | Gomis 31' (pen.) 63'; Nelsson (yellow card) 32'; Aktürkoğlu 54'; Kutlu (yellow card) 66'; Marcão (yellow card) 90+4' | Report | Akgün 9'; Akaydın (yellow card) 30'; Balotelli 67'; Assombalonga (yellow card) 81' | Stadium: Nef Stadium; Referee: Sarper Barış Saka; Assistant referees: Ali Tuna, Murat Ergin Gözütok; Fourth official: Mehmet Türkmen |

| 20 May 2022 38 | Antalyaspor | 1–1 | Galatasaray | Muratpaşa, Antalya |
| 20:00 | Ndao 44'; Kudryashov (yellow card) 79'; Fernando (yellow card) 81' | Report | Mohamed 77'; Cicâldău (yellow card) 79'; Boey (yellow card) 90+5' | Stadium: Antalya Stadium; Referee: Yasin Kol; Assistant referees: Abdullah Bora Özkara, Mehmet Salih Mazlum; Fourth official: Furkan Aksuoğlu |

=== Turkish Cup ===
| 28 December 2021 Fifth round | Galatasaray | 3–3 (a.e.t.) (5–6 p) | Denizlispor | Sarıyer, Istanbul |
| 21:00 | Öztürk 30' (yellow card) 83' (yellow-red card) 90+5'; Dervişoğlu 49'; Mohamed 50' (yellow card) 50'; Bayram (yellow card) 90+3' | Report | Depe 9'; Akdarı (yellow card) 11'; Darri 38'; Sağlık (yellow card) 49'; Gönülaçar (yellow card) 70'; Hamzaçebi (yellow card) 83'; Nelsson 90+8' (o.g.); Süzen (yellow card) 98'; Böke (yellow card) 105' | Stadium: Nef Stadium; Referee: Volkan Bayarslan; Assistant referees: Serkan Ok, Bilal Gölen; Fourth official: Ramazan Keleş |
| | Penalties |
| | Nelsson (penalty scored); Dervişoğlu (penalty scored); Antalyalı (penalty scored); Mohamed (penalty scored); van Aanholt (penalty scored); Çağlayan (penalty missed) | | (penalty scored) Süzen; (penalty scored) Gönülaçar; (penalty scored) Çeçenoğlu; (penalty scored) Özdemir; (penalty scored) Sünger; (penalty scored) Schwechlen |

=== UEFA Champions League ===
==== Second qualifying round ====
| 21 July 2021 First leg | PSV Eindhoven (Netherlands) | 5–1 | (Turkey) Galatasaray | Eindhoven, Netherlands |
| 22:00 TRT | Zahavi 2', 35', 84'; Götze 52', 89' | Report | Kılınç 42'; Marcão (yellow card) 74'; Luyindama (yellow card) 78' | Stadium: Philips Stadion; Attendance: 23,500; Referee: Alejandro Hernández Hernández (Spain); Assistant referees: José Naranjo (Spain), Diego Sanchez Rojo (Spain); Fourth official: César Soto Grado (Spain) |

| 28 July 2021 Second leg | Galatasaray (Turkey) | 1–2 (2–7 agg.) | (Netherlands) PSV Eindhoven | Başakşehir, Istanbul, Turkey |
| 21:00 TRT | Diagne 84'; Kara (yellow card) 88' | Report | Madueke 37'; Van Ginkel 59'; Boscagli (yellow card) 65' (yellow-red card) 74' | Stadium: Başakşehir Fatih Terim Stadium; Attendance: 5,775; Referee: Massimiliano Irrati (Italy); Assistant referees: Filippo Meli (Italy), Stefano Alassio (Italy); Fourth official: Luca Pairetto (Italy) |

=== UEFA Europa League ===
==== Third qualifying round ====
| 5 August 2021 First leg | Galatasaray (Turkey) | 1–1 | (Scotland) St Johnstone | Başakşehir, Istanbul, Turkey |
| 21:00 TRT | Antalyalı (yellow card) 49'; Muslera (red card) 56'; Boey 60'; Marcão (yellow card) 80'; Turan (yellow card) 90+3' | Report | Kane (yellow card) 31'; Kerr (yellow card) 51', (goal) 58' (pen.); Devine (yellow card) 80' | Stadium: Başakşehir Fatih Terim Stadium; Attendance: 6,216; Referee: Sandro Schärer (Switzerland); Assistant referees: Bekim Zogaj (Switzerland), Jonas Erni (Switzerland); Fourth official: Lukas Fähndrich (Switzerland) |

| 12 August 2021 Second leg | St Johnstone (Scotland) | 2–4 (3–5 agg.) | (Turkey) Galatasaray | Perth, Scotland |
| 21:00 TRT | Kerr 37'; Kane (yellow card) 39'; Craig (yellow card) 40'; Davidson (yellow card) 60'; Hendry (yellow card) 77'; O'Halloran 90+4' | Report | Diagne 30'; Çipe (yellow card) 37'; Marcão (yellow card) 41'; van Aanholt (yellow card) 48'; Aktürkoğlu 64'; Feghouli 70'; Kılınç 90+2' | Stadium: McDiarmid Park; Attendance: 9,106; Referee: Andris Treimanis (Latvia); Assistant referees: Haralds Gudermanis (Latvia), Aleksejs Spasjoņņikovs (Latvia); Fourth official: Aleksandrs Golubevs (Latvia) |

==== Play-off round ====
| 19 August 2021 First leg | Randers (Denmark) | 1–1 | (Turkey) Galatasaray | Randers, Denmark |
| 20:00 TRT | Lauenborg 54' | Report | Aktürkoğlu 26' | Stadium: Randers Stadium; Attendance: 7,064; Referee: Jesús Gil Manzano (Spain); Assistant referees: Diego Barbero (Spain), Ángel Nevado (Spain); Fourth official: José María Sánchez Martínez (Spain) |

| 26 August 2021 Second leg | Galatasaray (Turkey) | 2–1 (3–2 agg.) | (Denmark) Randers | Kasımpaşa, Istanbul, Turkey |
| 21:00 TRT | Van Aanholt (yellow card) 39' (goal) 48'; Öztürk (yellow card) 54'; Lauenborg 59' (o.g.); Luyindama (yellow card) 69'; Muslera (yellow card) 90' | Report | Egho 11' (yellow card) 54'; Johnsen (yellow card) 66'; Kamara (yellow card) 71'; Piesinger (yellow card) 90+1'; Bundgaard (yellow card) 90+5' | Stadium: Recep Tayyip Erdoğan Stadium; Attendance: 3,947; Referee: Aleksei Kulbakov (Belarus); Assistant referees: Dmitri Zhuk (Belarus), Oleg Maslyanko (Belarus); Fourth official: Dzmitry Dzmitryieu (Belarus) |

==== Group stage ====
The group stage draw was held on 27 August 2021.

| Pos | Team | Pld | W | D | L | GF | GA | GD | Pts | Qualification | GAL | LAZ | MAR | LOK |
|---|---|---|---|---|---|---|---|---|---|---|---|---|---|---|
| 1 | (Turkey) Galatasaray | 6 | 3 | 3 | 0 | 7 | 3 | +4 | 12 | Advance to round of 16 | — | 1–0 | 4–2 | 1–1 |
| 2 | (Italy) Lazio | 6 | 2 | 3 | 1 | 7 | 3 | +4 | 9 | Advance to knockout round play-offs | 0–0 | — | 0–0 | 2–0 |
| 3 | (France) Marseille | 6 | 1 | 4 | 1 | 6 | 7 | −1 | 7 | Transfer to Europa Conference League | 0–0 | 2–2 | — | 1–0 |
| 4 | (Russia) Lokomotiv Moscow | 6 | 0 | 2 | 4 | 2 | 9 | −7 | 2 | | 0–1 | 0–3 | 1–1 | — |

Source: UEFA
Rules for classification: Group stage tiebreakers

| 16 September 2021 1 | Galatasaray (Turkey) | 1–0 | (Italy) Lazio | Sarıyer, Istanbul, Turkey |
| 19:45 TRT | Muslera (yellow card) 8'; Strakosha 67' (o.g.) | Report | Akpa Akpro (yellow card) 43'; Muriqi (yellow card) 88'; Zaccagni (yellow card) 90+4' | Stadium: Türk Telekom Stadium; Attendance: 15,353; Referee: Matej Jug (Slovenia); Assistant referees: Matej Žunič (Slovenia), Manuel Vidali (Slovenia); Fourth official: David Smajc (Slovenia) |

| 30 September 2021 2 | Marseille (France) | 0–0 | (Turkey) Galatasaray | Marseille, France |
| 22:00 TRT | Saliba (yellow card) 90+5'; Álvaro (yellow card) 90+6'; Payet (yellow card) 90+10' | Report | Boey (yellow card) 53'; Muslera (yellow card) 90+4'; Diagne (yellow card) 90+5' | Stadium: Stade Vélodrome; Attendance: 49,870; Referee: Paweł Raczkowski (Poland); Assistant referees: Radosław Siejka (Poland), Adam Kupsik (Poland); Fourth official: Piotr Lasyk (Poland) |

| 21 October 2021 3 | Lokomotiv Moscow (Russia) | 0–1 | (Turkey) Galatasaray | Moscow, Russia |
| 22:00 TRT | Barinov (yellow card) 70' | Report | Babel (yellow card) 36'; Antalyalı (yellow card) 43'; Mohamed (yellow card) 73'; Aktürkoğlu 82'; Moruțan (yellow card) 90' | Stadium: RZD Arena; Attendance: 8,100; Referee: Harald Lechner (Austria); Assistant referees: Andreas Heidenreich (Austria), Maximilian Kolbitsch (Austria); Fourth official: Markus Hameter (Austria) |

| 4 November 2021 4 | Galatasaray (Turkey) | 1–1 | (Russia) Lokomotiv Moscow | Sarıyer, Istanbul, Turkey |
| 20:45 TRT | Yedlin (yellow card) 8'; Feghouli 43'; Yılmaz (yellow card) 74'; Diagne (yellow card) 90+3'; Dervişoğlu (yellow card) 90+4' | Report | Nenakhov (yellow card) 14'; Jedvaj (yellow card) 36'; Kamano 72'; Rybchinsky (yellow card) 90+3'; Barinov (yellow card) 90+3' | Stadium: Nef Stadium; Attendance: 27,776; Referee: Sandro Schärer (Switzerland); Assistant referees: Bekim Zogaj (Switzerland), Jonas Erni (Switzerland); Fourth official: Alain Bieri (Switzerland) |

| 25 November 2021 5 | Galatasaray (Turkey) | 4–2 | (France) Marseille | Sarıyer, Istanbul, Turkey |
| 20:45 TRT | Cicâldău 12' (yellow card) 36'; Ćaleta-Car 30' (o.g.); Feghouli 64'; Babel 83'; Moruțan (yellow card) 90+4' | Report | Gueye (yellow card) 37'; Dieng (yellow card) 45+1'; Peres (yellow card) 53'; Guendouzi (yellow card) 61'; Milik (penalty missed) 69', 85' (yellow card) 89'; Gerson (yellow card) 90+6' | Stadium: Nef Stadium; Attendance: 39,758; Referee: Tobias Stieler (Germany); Assistant referees: Eduard Beitinger (Germany), Robert Kempter (Germany); Fourth official: Florian Badstübner (Germany) |

| 9 December 2021 6 | Lazio (Italy) | 0–0 | (Turkey) Galatasaray | Rome, Italy |
| 23:00 TRT | Felipe (yellow card) 11' | Report | Aktürkoğlu (yellow card) 17'; Bayram (yellow card) 77'; Kılınç (yellow card) 84' | Stadium: Stadio Olimpico; Attendance: 13,178; Referee: Carlos del Cerro Grande (Spain); Assistant referees: Juan Carlos Yuste (Spain), Roberto Alonso Fernández (Spain); Fourth official: César Soto Grado (Spain) |

==== Knockout phase ====
===== Round of 16 =====
The draw for the round of 16 was held on 25 February 2022.

| 10 March 2022 First leg | Barcelona (Spain) | 0–0 | (Turkey) Galatasaray | Barcelona, Spain |
| 23:00 (21:00 TRT) | Depay (yellow card) 35'; Alba (yellow card) 89' | Report | Kutlu (yellow card) 31'; Antalyalı (yellow card) 77' | Stadium: Camp Nou; Attendance: 61,740; Referee: Benoît Bastien (France); Assistant referees: Hicham Zakrani (France), Aurélien Berthomieu (France); Fourth official: Jérémie Pignard (France) |

| 17 March 2022 Second leg | Galatasaray (Turkey) | 1–2 (1–2 agg.) | (Spain) Barcelona | Sarıyer, Istanbul, Turkey |
| 18:45 (20:45 TRT) | Marcão 29' (yellow card) 29'; van Aanholt (yellow card) 71'; Bayram (yellow card) 90' | Report | Busquets (yellow card) 27'; Pedri 37'; García (yellow card) 40'; Aubameyang 49'; Gavi (yellow card) 78'; Alba (yellow card) 88' | Stadium: Nef Stadium; Attendance: 50,110; Referee: Daniele Orsato (Italy); Assistant referees: Alessandro Giallatini (Italy), Fabiano Preti (Italy); Fourth official: Daniele Chiffi (Italy) |

== Statistics ==
=== Appearances and goals ===
| No. | Pos. | Player | Süper Lig | | Turkish Cup | | UEFA Champions League | | UEFA Europa League | | Total | |
| No. | Pos. | Player | Apps | Goals | Apps | Goals | Apps | Goals | Apps | Goals | Apps | Goals |
|---|---|---|---|---|---|---|---|---|---|---|---|---|
| 1 | GK | (Uruguay) Fernando Muslera | 25 | 0 | 0 | 0 | 2 | 0 | 9 | 0 | 36 | 0 |
| 3 | DF | (Norway) Omar Elabdellaoui | 7 | 0 | 0 | 0 | 0 | 0 | 0 | 0 | 7 | 0 |
| 4 | MF | (Turkey) Taylan Antalyalı | 30 | 0 | 1 | 0 | 0 | 0 | 11 | 0 | 42 | 0 |
| 5 | DF | (Turkey) Alpaslan Öztürk | 11 | 0 | 1 | 1 | 1 | 0 | 3 | 0 | 16 | 1 |
| 6 | DF | (Netherlands) Patrick van Aanholt | 35 | 2 | 1 | 0 | 0 | 0 | 12 | 1 | 48 | 3 |
| 7 | MF | (Turkey) Kerem Aktürkoğlu | 37 | 10 | 1 | 0 | 2 | 0 | 12 | 3 | 52 | 13 |
| 8 | MF | (Netherlands) Ryan Babel | 30 | 3 | 0 | 0 | 2 | 0 | 11 | 1 | 43 | 4 |
| 11 | FW | (Egypt) Mostafa Mohamed | 27 | 7 | 1 | 1 | 2 | 0 | 11 | 0 | 41 | 8 |
| 13 | GK | (Turkey) İsmail Çipe | 7 | 0 | 1 | 0 | 0 | 0 | 1 | 0 | 9 | 0 |
| 15 | MF | (Chile) Erick Pulgar | 11 | 0 | 0 | 0 | 0 | 0 | 0 | 0 | 11 | 0 |
| 18 | FW | (France) Bafétimbi Gomis | 14 | 9 | 0 | 0 | 0 | 0 | 2 | 0 | 16 | 9 |
| 19 | DF | (Turkey) Ömer Bayram | 21 | 0 | 1 | 0 | 2 | 0 | 5 | 0 | 29 | 0 |
| 21 | MF | (Romania) Olimpiu Moruțan | 26 | 3 | 1 | 0 | 0 | 0 | 7 | 0 | 34 | 3 |
| 22 | MF | (Turkey) Berkan Kutlu | 35 | 0 | 1 | 0 | 0 | 0 | 12 | 0 | 48 | 0 |
| 23 | GK | (Spain) Iñaki Peña | 6 | 0 | 0 | 0 | 0 | 0 | 2 | 0 | 8 | 0 |
| 24 | DF | (Turkey) Işık Kaan Arslan | 1 | 0 | 1 | 0 | 0 | 0 | 0 | 0 | 2 | 0 |
| 25 | DF | (Denmark) Victor Nelsson | 36 | 1 | 1 | 0 | 0 | 0 | 8 | 0 | 45 | 1 |
| 33 | MF | (Romania) Alexandru Cicâldău | 32 | 4 | 1 | 0 | 0 | 0 | 7 | 1 | 40 | 5 |
| 45 | DF | (Brazil) Marcão | 26 | 0 | 1 | 0 | 2 | 0 | 10 | 1 | 39 | 1 |
| 53 | MF | (Turkey) Barış Alper Yılmaz | 17 | 0 | 1 | 0 | 1 | 0 | 4 | 0 | 23 | 0 |
| 54 | MF | (Turkey) Emre Kılınç | 27 | 3 | 1 | 0 | 2 | 1 | 7 | 1 | 37 | 5 |
| 63 | MF | (Turkey) Bartuğ Elmaz | 0 | 0 | 0 | 0 | 0 | 0 | 1 | 0 | 1 | 0 |
| 66 | MF | (Turkey) Arda Turan | 7 | 0 | 0 | 0 | 2 | 0 | 3 | 0 | 12 | 0 |
| 67 | FW | (Turkey) Halil Dervişoğlu | 28 | 4 | 1 | 1 | 0 | 0 | 4 | 0 | 33 | 5 |
| 88 | DF | (Turkey) Semih Kaya | 2 | 0 | 0 | 0 | 0 | 0 | 0 | 0 | 2 | 0 |
| 89 | MF | (Algeria) Sofiane Feghouli | 21 | 2 | 0 | 0 | 1 | 0 | 8 | 3 | 30 | 5 |
| 90 | FW | (Senegal) Mbaye Diagne | 14 | 2 | 0 | 0 | 1 | 1 | 8 | 1 | 23 | 4 |
| 93 | DF | (France) Sacha Boey | 13 | 0 | 0 | 0 | 0 | 0 | 6 | 1 | 19 | 1 |
| 99 | GK | (France) Fatih Öztürk | 1 | 0 | 0 | 0 | 0 | 0 | 0 | 0 | 1 | 0 |
Player(s) on loan but featured this season
| 17 | MF | (Turkey) Oğulcan Çağlayan | 8 | 0 | 1 | 0 | 0 | 0 | 0 | 0 | 9 | 0 |
| 20 | MF | (Turkey) Emre Akbaba | 1 | 0 | 0 | 0 | 0 | 0 | 2 | 0 | 3 | 0 |
| 23 | DF | (Turkey) Emre Taşdemir | 0 | 0 | 0 | 0 | 2 | 0 | 0 | 0 | 2 | 0 |
| 27 | DF | (Democratic Republic of the Congo) Christian Luyindama | 8 | 1 | 0 | 0 | 2 | 0 | 9 | 0 | 19 | 1 |
| 30 | MF | (Turkey) Atalay Babacan | 3 | 0 | 0 | 0 | 1 | 0 | 0 | 0 | 4 | 0 |
| 35 | MF | (Turkey) Aytaç Kara | 6 | 0 | 0 | 0 | 2 | 0 | 4 | 0 | 12 | 0 |
| 49 | DF | (Nigeria) Valentine Ozornwafor | 0 | 0 | 0 | 0 | 0 | 0 | 0 | 0 | 0 | 0 |
| 70 | MF | (Turkey) Yunus Akgün | 0 | 0 | 0 | 0 | 1 | 0 | 0 | 0 | 1 | 0 |
| 77 | MF | (Nigeria) Jesse Sekidika | 0 | 0 | 0 | 0 | 2 | 0 | 1 | 0 | 3 | 0 |
| 80 | FW | (Turkey) Ali Yavuz Kol | 0 | 0 | 0 | 0 | 0 | 0 | 0 | 0 | 0 | 0 |
| 98 | GK | (Turkey) Berk Balaban | 0 | 0 | 0 | 0 | 0 | 0 | 1 | 0 | 1 | 0 |
Player(s) transferred out but featured this season
| 2 | DF | (United States) DeAndre Yedlin | 16 | 0 | 0 | 0 | 1 | 0 | 7 | 0 | 24 | 0 |
| 9 | FW | (Colombia) Radamel Falcao | 1 | 0 | 0 | 0 | 1 | 0 | 1 | 0 | 3 | 0 |
| 12 | MF | (Brazil) Gustavo Assunção | 2 | 0 | 0 | 0 | 0 | 0 | 0 | 0 | 2 | 0 |

Last updated: 20 May 2022.
Source: FBref.com, ntvspor.net

=== Goalscorers ===
| Rank | No. | Pos. | Player | Süper Lig | Turkish Cup | UEFA Champions League | UEFA Europa League | Total |
|---|---|---|---|---|---|---|---|---|
| 1 | 7 | MF | (Turkey) Kerem Aktürkoğlu | 10 | 0 | 0 | 3 | 13 |
| 2 | 18 | FW | (France) Bafétimbi Gomis | 9 | 0 | 0 | 0 | 9 |
| 3 | 11 | FW | (Egypt) Mostafa Mohamed | 7 | 1 | 0 | 0 | 8 |
| 4 | 33 | MF | (Romania) Alexandru Cicâldău | 4 | 0 | 0 | 1 | 5 |
| 4 | 54 | MF | (Turkey) Emre Kılınç | 3 | 0 | 1 | 1 | 5 |
| 4 | 67 | FW | (Turkey) Halil Dervişoğlu | 4 | 1 | 0 | 0 | 5 |
| 4 | 89 | MF | (Algeria) Sofiane Feghouli | 2 | 0 | 0 | 3 | 5 |
| 5 | 8 | MF | (Netherlands) Ryan Babel | 3 | 0 | 0 | 1 | 4 |
| 5 | 90 | FW | (Senegal) Mbaye Diagne | 2 | 0 | 1 | 1 | 4 |
| 6 | 6 | DF | (Netherlands) Patrick van Aanholt | 2 | 0 | 0 | 1 | 3 |
| 6 | 21 | MF | (Romania) Olimpiu Moruțan | 3 | 0 | 0 | 0 | 3 |
| 7 | 5 | DF | (Turkey) Alpaslan Öztürk | 0 | 1 | 0 | 0 | 1 |
| 7 | 25 | DF | (Denmark) Victor Nelsson | 1 | 0 | 0 | 0 | 1 |
| 7 | 27 | DF | (Democratic Republic of the Congo) Christian Luyindama | 1 | 0 | 0 | 0 | 1 |
| 7 | 45 | DF | (Brazil) Marcão | 0 | 0 | 0 | 1 | 1 |
| 7 | 93 | DF | (France) Sacha Boey | 0 | 0 | 0 | 1 | 1 |
| Own goals | | | | 0 | 0 | 0 | 3 | 3 |
| Totals | | | | 51 | 3 | 2 | 16 | 72 |

Last updated: 20 May 2022.
Source: FBref.com, ntvspor.net

=== Assists ===
| Rank | No. | Pos. | Player | Süper Lig | Turkish Cup | UEFA Champions League | UEFA Europa League | Total |
|---|---|---|---|---|---|---|---|---|
| 1 | 7 | MF | (Turkey) Kerem Aktürkoğlu | 5 | 0 | 0 | 4 | 9 |
| 2 | 11 | FW | (Egypt) Mostafa Mohamed | 3 | 1 | 0 | 1 | 5 |
| 2 | 21 | MF | (Romania) Olimpiu Moruțan | 3 | 1 | 0 | 1 | 5 |
| 2 | 89 | MF | (Algeria) Sofiane Feghouli | 4 | 0 | 0 | 1 | 5 |
| 3 | 33 | MF | (Romania) Alexandru Cicâldău | 3 | 0 | 0 | 1 | 4 |
| 4 | 6 | DF | (Netherlands) Patrick van Aanholt | 2 | 0 | 0 | 1 | 3 |
| 4 | 19 | DF | (Turkey) Ömer Bayram | 2 | 0 | 1 | 0 | 3 |
| 4 | 22 | MF | (Turkey) Berkan Kutlu | 3 | 0 | 0 | 0 | 3 |
| 5 | 8 | MF | (Netherlands) Ryan Babel | 1 | 0 | 0 | 1 | 2 |
| 5 | 54 | MF | (Turkey) Emre Kılınç | 1 | 1 | 0 | 0 | 2 |
| 6 | 3 | DF | (Norway) Omar Elabdellaoui | 1 | 0 | 0 | 0 | 1 |
| 6 | 23 | DF | (Turkey) Emre Taşdemir | 0 | 0 | 1 | 0 | 1 |
| 6 | 45 | DF | (Brazil) Marcão | 0 | 0 | 0 | 1 | 1 |
| 6 | 66 | MF | (Turkey) Arda Turan | 0 | 0 | 0 | 1 | 1 |
| 6 | 67 | FW | (Turkey) Halil Dervişoğlu | 1 | 0 | 0 | 0 | 1 |
| 6 | 90 | FW | (Senegal) Mbaye Diagne | 1 | 0 | 0 | 0 | 1 |
| Totals | | | | 30 | 3 | 2 | 12 | 47 |

Last updated: 20 May 2022.
Source: FBref.com, ntvspor.net

=== Clean sheets ===
| Rank | No. | Pos. | Player | Süper Lig | Turkish Cup | UEFA Champions League | UEFA Europa League | Total |
|---|---|---|---|---|---|---|---|---|
| 1 | 1 | GK | (Uruguay) Fernando Muslera | 8 | 0 | 0 | 4 | 12 |
| 2 | 13 | GK | (Turkey) İsmail Çipe | 1 | 0 | 0 | 0 | 1 |
| 3 | 23 | GK | (Spain) Iñaki Peña | 0 | 0 | 0 | 1 | 1 |
| 4 | 98 | GK | (Turkey) Berk Balaban | 0 | 0 | 0 | 0 | 0 |
| 5 | 99 | GK | (France) Fatih Öztürk | 0 | 0 | 0 | 0 | 0 |
| Totals | | | | 9 | 0 | 0 | 5 | 14 |

Last updated: 20 May 2022.
Source: FBref.com

=== Disciplinary record ===
| No. | Pos. | Player | Süper Lig | | | Turkish Cup | | | UEFA Champions League | | | UEFA Europa League | | | Total | | |
| No. | Pos. | Player | Yellow card | (yellow card) (yellow-red card) | Red card | Yellow card | (yellow card) (yellow-red card) | Red card | Yellow card | (yellow card) (yellow-red card) | Red card | Yellow card | (yellow card) (yellow-red card) | Red card | Yellow card | (yellow card) (yellow-red card) | Red card |
|---|---|---|---|---|---|---|---|---|---|---|---|---|---|---|---|---|---|
| 1 | GK | (Uruguay) Fernando Muslera | 3 | 0 | 0 | 0 | 0 | 0 | 0 | 0 | 0 | 3 | 0 | 1 | 6 | 0 | 1 |
| 2 | DF | (United States) DeAndre Yedlin | 3 | 0 | 0 | 0 | 0 | 0 | 0 | 0 | 0 | 1 | 0 | 0 | 4 | 0 | 0 |
| 3 | DF | (Norway) Omar Elabdellaoui | 2 | 0 | 0 | 0 | 0 | 0 | 0 | 0 | 0 | 0 | 0 | 0 | 2 | 0 | 0 |
| 4 | MF | (Turkey) Taylan Antalyalı | 6 | 0 | 1 | 0 | 0 | 0 | 0 | 0 | 0 | 3 | 0 | 0 | 9 | 0 | 1 |
| 5 | DF | (Turkey) Alpaslan Öztürk | 2 | 0 | 0 | 0 | 1 | 0 | 0 | 0 | 0 | 1 | 0 | 0 | 3 | 1 | 0 |
| 6 | DF | (Netherlands) Patrick van Aanholt | 3 | 0 | 0 | 0 | 0 | 0 | 0 | 0 | 0 | 3 | 0 | 0 | 6 | 0 | 0 |
| 7 | MF | (Turkey) Kerem Aktürkoğlu | 5 | 0 | 0 | 0 | 0 | 0 | 0 | 0 | 0 | 1 | 0 | 0 | 6 | 0 | 0 |
| 8 | MF | (Netherlands) Ryan Babel | 3 | 0 | 0 | 0 | 0 | 0 | 0 | 0 | 0 | 1 | 0 | 0 | 4 | 0 | 0 |
| 11 | FW | (Egypt) Mostafa Mohamed | 4 | 0 | 0 | 1 | 0 | 0 | 0 | 0 | 0 | 1 | 0 | 0 | 6 | 0 | 0 |
| 12 | MF | (Brazil) Gustavo Assunção | 1 | 0 | 0 | 0 | 0 | 0 | 0 | 0 | 0 | 0 | 0 | 0 | 1 | 0 | 0 |
| 13 | GK | (Turkey) İsmail Çipe | 0 | 0 | 0 | 0 | 0 | 0 | 0 | 0 | 0 | 1 | 0 | 0 | 1 | 0 | 0 |
| 15 | MF | (Chile) Erick Pulgar | 2 | 0 | 0 | 0 | 0 | 0 | 0 | 0 | 0 | 0 | 0 | 0 | 2 | 0 | 0 |
| 17 | MF | (Turkey) Oğulcan Çağlayan | 2 | 0 | 0 | 0 | 0 | 0 | 0 | 0 | 0 | 0 | 0 | 0 | 2 | 0 | 0 |
| 18 | FW | (France) Bafétimbi Gomis | 2 | 0 | 0 | 0 | 0 | 0 | 0 | 0 | 0 | 0 | 0 | 0 | 2 | 0 | 0 |
| 19 | DF | (Turkey) Ömer Bayram | 4 | 0 | 0 | 1 | 0 | 0 | 0 | 0 | 0 | 2 | 0 | 0 | 7 | 0 | 0 |
| 21 | MF | (Romania) Olimpiu Moruțan | 1 | 0 | 0 | 0 | 0 | 0 | 0 | 0 | 0 | 2 | 0 | 0 | 3 | 0 | 0 |
| 22 | MF | (Turkey) Berkan Kutlu | 5 | 0 | 1 | 0 | 0 | 0 | 0 | 0 | 0 | 1 | 0 | 0 | 6 | 0 | 1 |
| 23 | GK | (Spain) Iñaki Peña | 1 | 0 | 0 | 0 | 0 | 0 | 0 | 0 | 0 | 0 | 0 | 0 | 1 | 0 | 0 |
| 25 | DF | (Denmark) Victor Nelsson | 7 | 0 | 0 | 0 | 0 | 0 | 0 | 0 | 0 | 0 | 0 | 0 | 7 | 0 | 0 |
| 27 | DF | (Democratic Republic of the Congo) Christian Luyindama | 3 | 0 | 0 | 0 | 0 | 0 | 1 | 0 | 0 | 1 | 0 | 0 | 5 | 0 | 0 |
| 33 | MF | (Romania) Alexandru Cicâldău | 7 | 0 | 0 | 0 | 0 | 0 | 0 | 0 | 0 | 1 | 0 | 0 | 8 | 0 | 0 |
| 35 | DF | (Turkey) Aytaç Kara | 2 | 0 | 0 | 0 | 0 | 0 | 1 | 0 | 0 | 0 | 0 | 0 | 3 | 0 | 0 |
| 45 | DF | (Brazil) Marcão | 9 | 0 | 1 | 0 | 0 | 0 | 1 | 0 | 0 | 3 | 0 | 0 | 13 | 0 | 1 |
| 53 | MF | (Turkey) Barış Alper Yılmaz | 0 | 0 | 0 | 0 | 0 | 0 | 0 | 0 | 0 | 1 | 0 | 0 | 1 | 0 | 0 |
| 54 | MF | (Turkey) Emre Kılınç | 4 | 0 | 0 | 0 | 0 | 0 | 0 | 0 | 0 | 1 | 0 | 0 | 5 | 0 | 0 |
| 66 | MF | (Turkey) Arda Turan | 0 | 0 | 0 | 0 | 0 | 0 | 0 | 0 | 0 | 1 | 0 | 0 | 1 | 0 | 0 |
| 67 | FW | (Turkey) Halil Dervişoğlu | 2 | 0 | 0 | 0 | 0 | 0 | 0 | 0 | 0 | 1 | 0 | 0 | 3 | 0 | 0 |
| 89 | MF | (Algeria) Sofiane Feghouli | 1 | 0 | 0 | 0 | 0 | 0 | 0 | 0 | 0 | 0 | 0 | 0 | 1 | 0 | 0 |
| 90 | FW | (Senegal) Mbaye Diagne | 1 | 0 | 0 | 0 | 0 | 0 | 0 | 0 | 0 | 2 | 0 | 0 | 3 | 0 | 0 |
| 93 | DF | (France) Sacha Boey | 3 | 0 | 0 | 0 | 0 | 0 | 0 | 0 | 0 | 1 | 0 | 0 | 4 | 0 | 0 |
| 99 | GK | (France) Fatih Öztürk | 1 | 0 | 0 | 0 | 0 | 0 | 0 | 0 | 0 | 0 | 0 | 0 | 1 | 0 | 0 |
| Totals | | | 89 | 0 | 3 | 2 | 1 | 0 | 3 | 0 | 0 | 32 | 0 | 1 | 126 | 1 | 4 |

Last updated: 20 May 2022.
Source: FBref.com, ntvspor.net

== Injury record ==
| N | P | Nat. | Name | Type | Status | Source | Match | Inj. Date | Ret. Date |
| 3 | DF | (Norway) | Omar Elabdellaoui | Eye Injury | | Galatasaray.org | at home | 31 December 2020 | 25 January 2022 |
| 2 | DF | (United States) | DeAndre Yedlin | Corona virus | | fotomac.com.tr | epidemic | 16 July 2021 | 26 July 2021 |
| 20 | MF | (Turkey) | Emre Akbaba | Corona virus | | fotomac.com.tr | epidemic | 16 July 2021 | 8 August 2021 |
| 66 | MF | (Turkey) | Arda Turan | Ankle Injury | | Galatasaray.org | vs Randers | 19 August 2021 | 10 December 2021 |
| 53 | MF | (Turkey) | Barış Alper Yılmaz | Hand fracture | | hurriyet.com.tr | vs Scotland U21 | 7 September 2021 | 27 September 2021 |
| 89 | MF | (Algeria) | Sofiane Feghouli | groin strain | | hurriyet.com.tr | vs Burkina Faso | 7 September 2021 | 15 September 2021 |
| 93 | DF | (France) | Sacha Boey | Hamstring Injury | | fotomac.com.tr | in training | 8 September 2021 | 27 September 2021 |
| 93 | DF | (France) | Sacha Boey | unknown | | fotomac.com.tr | vs Marseille | 30 September 2021 | 31 December 2021 |
| 33 | MF | (Romania) | Alexandru Cicâldău | Corona virus | | sporx.com | epidemic | 2 December 2021 | 12 December 2021 |
| 45 | DF | (Brazil) | Marcão | Groin Injury | | fanatik.com.tr | vs Lazio | 9 December 2021 | 14 December 2021 |
| 1 | GK | (Uruguay) | Fernando Muslera | Torn knee ligament | | Galatasaray.org | vs Sivasspor | 13 December 2021 | 22 February 2022 |
| 27 | DF | (Democratic Republic of the Congo) | Christian Luyindama | Edema in the knee | | Galatasaray.org | vs Sivasspor | 13 December 2021 | 5 January 2022 |
| 90 | FW | (Senegal) | Mbaye Diagne | Femoral Fracture | | Galatasaray.org | vs İstanbul Başakşehir | 18 December 2021 | 4 April 2022 |
| 89 | MF | (Algeria) | Sofiane Feghouli | Muscle bruise | | fanatik.com.tr | in training | 27 December 2021 | 9 January 2022 |
| 6 | DF | (Netherlands) | Patrick van Aanholt | Corona virus | | hurriyet.com.tr | epidemic | 3 January 2022 | 11 January 2022 |
| 5 | DF | (Turkey) | Alpaslan Öztürk | Corona virus | | Galatasaray.org | epidemic | 4 January 2022 | 11 January 2022 |
| 99 | GK | (France) | Fatih Öztürk | Corona virus | | Galatasaray.org | epidemic | 4 January 2022 | 11 January 2022 |
| 4 | MF | (Turkey) | Taylan Antalyalı | Corona virus | | Galatasaray.org | epidemic | 6 January 2022 | 13 January 2022 |
| 24 | DF | (Turkey) | Işık Kaan Arslan | Hamstring Injury | | sozcu.com.tr | vs Giresunspor | 8 January 2022 | 22 February 2022 |
| 5 | DF | (Turkey) | Alpaslan Öztürk | Shoulder Injury | | ntvspor.net | vs Kasımpaşa | 20 January 2022 | 1 February 2022 |
| 99 | GK | (France) | Fatih Öztürk | Vestibular disorder | | fanatik.com.tr | in training | 31 January 2022 | 21 May 2022 |
| 54 | MF | (Turkey) | Emre Kılınç | intestial virus | | ajansspor.com | in training | 10 February 2022 | 13 February 2022 |
| 66 | MF | (Turkey) | Arda Turan | groin strain | | ajansspor.com | in training | 3 March 2022 | 25 March 2022 |
| 3 | DF | (Norway) | Omar Elabdellaoui | Unknown Injury | | sporx.com | in training | 14 March 2022 | 6 April 2022 |
| 89 | MF | (Algeria) | Sofiane Feghouli | Groin Injury | | hurriyet.com.tr | vs Beşiktaş | 16 March 2022 | 19 March 2022 |
| 89 | MF | (Algeria) | Sofiane Feghouli | Thigh muscle rupture | | ntvspor.net | vs Cameroon | 25 March 2022 | 27 April 2022 |
| 93 | DF | (France) | Sacha Boey | Corona virus | | cnnturk.com | epidemic | 25 March 2022 | 3 April 2022 |
| 11 | FW | (Egypt) | Mostafa Mohamed | Thigh Problems | | hurriyet.com.tr | vs Senegal | 29 March 2022 | 19 April 2022 |
| 7 | MF | (Turkey) | Kerem Aktürkoğlu | Groin Strain | | sozcu.com.tr | vs Fatih Karagümrük | 2 April 2022 | 8 April 2022 |
| 45 | DF | (Brazil) | Marcão | Thigh Muscle Strain | | hurriyet.com.tr | vs Altay | 24 April 2022 | 8 May 2022 |

- Player is injured
- Player has recovered from injury
Last updated: 21 May 2022
Source: Galatasaray Sports Club
