= Civelek =

Civelek is a surname. Notable people with the surname include:

- Emirhan Civelek (born 2000), Turkish footballer
- İlayda Civelek (born 1998), Turkish footballer
- Nuriye Ulviye Mevlan Civelek (1893–1964), Turkish women's rights advocate
- Ramazan Civelek (born 1996), Turkish footballer
