= Iñaki Peña =

Spanish footballer (born 1999)

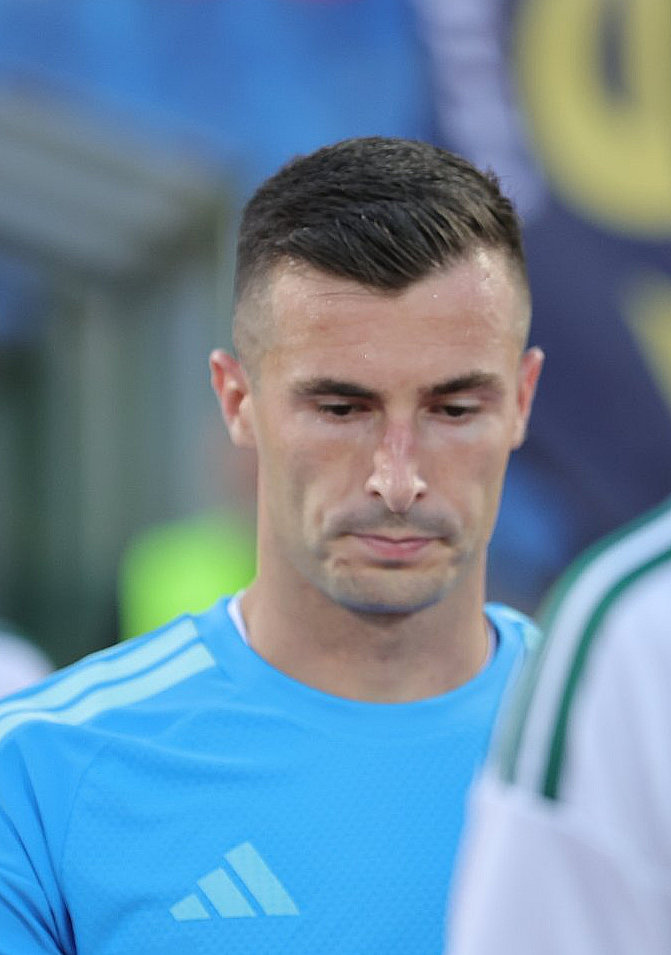
- Peña with Panathinaikos F.C. in 2026

Personal information
- Full name: Ignacio Peña Sotorres
- Date of birth: 2 March 1999 (age 27)
- Place of birth: Alicante, Spain
- Height: 1.84 m (6 ft 0 in)
- Position: Goalkeeper

Team information
- Current team: Panathinaikos
- Number: 1

Youth career
- 2004–2009: Alicante
- 2009–2012: Villarreal
- 2012–2018: Barcelona

Senior career*
Years	Team	Apps	(Gls)
2018–2022	Barcelona B	59	(0)
2022–2026	Barcelona	28	(0)
2022	→ Galatasaray (loan)	6	(0)
2025–2026	→ Elche (loan)	16	(0)
2026–	Panathinaikos	10	(0)

International career
2014–2015	Spain U16	3	(0)
2015–2016	Spain U17	18	(0)
2017	Spain U18	2	(0)
2017–2018	Spain U19	6	(0)
2020	Spain U21	1	(0)
Medal record
Men's football
Representing Spain
UEFA European Under-17 Championship
Runner-up	2016 Azerbaijan
- * Club domestic league appearances and goals as of 22:38, 8 November 2026

Ignacio "Iñaki" Peña Sotorres (born 2 March 1999) is a Spanish professional footballer who plays as a goalkeeper for Super League Greece club Panathinaikos.

== Club career ==
=== Barcelona ===
Born in Alicante, Valencian Community, Peña started his career at Alicante CF's youth setup in 2004, aged just five. In 2012, at the age of 13, he joined FC Barcelona from Villarreal CF. He was in the team that won the 2017–18 UEFA Youth League, being a starter in the final against Chelsea.

On 16 April 2018, Peña renewed his contract with Barça for three seasons, with an option for a further two. He was later promoted to the reserves in Segunda División B ahead of the 2018–19 season, and made his senior debut on 6 October 2018 by starting in a 1–1 home draw against CD Atlético Baleares.

On 30 October 2018, Peña was called up to the main squad for the first leg of round of 32 tie with Cultural Leonesa in the Copa del Rey as a backup to Jasper Cillessen, being an unused substitute in the 1–0 away win. He also appeared on the bench for some occasions during the season when Cillessen and starter Marc-André ter Stegen were out injured. Peña once again featured on the bench for the main squad during the 2019–20 campaign, to cover for Neto's absence due to injury. On 6 October 2020, Barcelona exercised the option on Peña's contract to extend it for a further two years.

==== Loan to Galatasaray ====
On 31 January 2022, Peña joined Galatasaray on loan for the remainder of the season. He made his professional debut in the Süper Lig on 6 February in a 1–1 draw at Alanyaspor under former Barcelona assistant Domènec Torrent, He had a record of two draws and as many wins before club icon Fernando Muslera began his return from injury; by the second half of March, after elimination from the UEFA Europa League by Barcelona, the Uruguayan won his place back.

==== Return to Barcelona ====
Peña returned to Barcelona as his loan deal expired, and made his official first team debut under manager Xavi in a 4–2 away win over Viktoria Plzeň in the UEFA Champions League on 1 November 2022.

On 3 January 2023, Peña was registered as a first team player, and was handed the number 13 shirt left vacant by Neto, who had left the club On 9 May 2023, Peña signed a contract extension with Barcelona, keeping him at the club until 2026. The new contract included a buyout clause of 400 million euros. Near the end of the season, Peña played against Real Valladolid and Celta Vigo, where he played a total of approximately 72 minutes of match time, after coming on for Marc-André ter Stegen at Valladolid at half time, and coming on at Celta at 63 minutes. He conceded 2 goals in 2 appearances. During a match against Villarreal on 22 September 2024, ter Stegen suffered a patellar tendon injury, which would force him to miss the rest of the season. Peña immediately replaced him in the 45 minutes of the first half, which ended in a 1–5 away victory.

On 26 October 2024, Peña held a clean sheet against Real Madrid in a 4–0 win, drawing praise for his performance in the match.

==== Loan to Elche ====
On 27 August 2025, Peña signed a three-year contract extension with Barcelona, before leaving to join fellow LaLiga side Elche on loan.

=== Panathinaikos ===
Peña joined Panathinaikos on 23 June 2026 on a three year deal.

== International career ==
Peña represented Spain at under-16, under-17, under-18, under-19 and under-21 levels, earning a combined total of 30 caps. He was a runner-up in the 2016 UEFA European Under-17 Championship, being a first-choice throughout the tournament. His sole under-21 appearance was on 12 November 2020 against the Faroe Islands in Marbella, coming on at half time for Álvaro Fernández in a 2–0 win in qualification for the following year's European Championship.

Due to the isolation of some national team players following the positive COVID-19 test of Sergio Busquets, Spain's under-21 squad were called up for the international friendly against Lithuania on 8 June 2021. However, Peña did not play.

== Career statistics ==
As of match played 8 November 2026

Appearances and goals by club, season and competition
Club	Season	League			National cup (Note: Includes Copa del Rey, Greek Cup)		Europe		Other		Total	
Club	Season	Division	Apps	Goals	Apps	Goals	Apps	Goals	Apps	Goals	Apps	Goals
Barcelona B	2018–19	Segunda División B	20	0	—		—		—		20	0
Barcelona B	2019–20	Segunda División B	18	0	—		—		3 (Note: Appearances(s) in Segunda División B play-offs)	0	21	0
Barcelona B	2020–21	Segunda División B	12 (Note: Includes three appearances in Segunda División B second phase)	0	—		—		1	0	13	0
Barcelona B	2021–22	Primera División RFEF	9	0	—		—		—		9	0
Barcelona B	Total		59	0	—		—		4	0	63	0
Barcelona	2018–19	La Liga	0	0	0	0	0	0	—		0	0
Barcelona	2019–20	La Liga	0	0	0	0	0	0	0	0	0	0
Barcelona	2020–21	La Liga	0	0	0	0	0	0	0	0	0	0
Barcelona	2021–22	La Liga	0	0	0	0	0	0	0	0	0	0
Barcelona	2022–23	La Liga	2	0	2	0	1 (Note: Appearance(s) in UEFA Champions League)	0	0	0	5	0
Barcelona	2023–24	La Liga	10	0	3	0	2	0	2 (Note: Appearance(s) in Supercopa de España)	0	17	0
Barcelona	2024–25	La Liga	16	0	1	0	5	0	1	0	23	0
Barcelona	Total		28	0	6	0	8	0	3	0	45	0
Galatasaray (loan)	2021–22	Süper Lig	6	0	0	0	2 (Note: Appearances in UEFA Europa League)	0	—		8	0
Elche (loan)	2025–26	La Liga	16	0	0	0	—		—		16	0
Panathinaikos	2026–27	Super League Greece	10	0	2	0	9 (Note: Appearances in UEFA Conference League)	0	—		21	0
Career total			115	0	8	0	19	0	7	0	149	0

== Honours ==
Barcelona youth

- UEFA Youth League: 2017–18

Barcelona

- La Liga: 2022–23, 2024–25
- Copa del Rey: 2020–21, 2024–25
- Supercopa de España: 2023, 2025

Spain U17

- UEFA European Under-17 Championship runner-up: 2016

Individual

- UEFA European Under-17 Championship Team of the Tournament: 2016
