= Gustavo Assunção =

Brazilian footballer (born 2000)

Personal information
- Full name: Gustavo Henrique Giordano Amaro Assunção da Silva
- Date of birth: 30 March 2000 (age 26)
- Place of birth: São Paulo, Brazil
- Height: 1.78 m (5 ft 10 in)
- Position: Defensive midfielder

Team information
- Current team: Apollon Limassol
- Number: 12

Youth career
- 2008–2019: Atlético Madrid

Senior career*
Years	Team	Apps	(Gls)
2019–2024	Famalicão	112	(2)
2021–2022	→ Galatasaray (loan)	2	(0)
2024–2025	AVS	23	(2)
2025–2026	AVS	10	(0)
2026–	Apollon Limassol	15	(2)

International career^{‡}
2017	Brazil U17	4	(1)
2020	Brazil U23	2	(0)
- * Club domestic league appearances and goals as of 00:22, 11 October 2026 (UTC) ‡ National team caps and goals as of 2 July 2021

Gustavo Henrique Giordano Amaro Assunção da Silva (born 30 March 2000), known as Gustavo Assunção, is a Brazilian professional footballer who plays as a defensive midfielder for Cypriot First Division club Apollon Limassol.

== Club career ==
=== Famalicão ===
On 1 July 2019, Assunção signed his first professional contract with Famalicão. Assunção made his professional debut with Famalicão in a 2–0 Taça da Liga loss to S.C. Covilhã on 3 August 2019.

==== Loan to Galatasaray ====
On 8 September 2021, it was announced that Assunção would leave Famalicão for Turkish Süper Lig club Galatasaray on a one-year loan move. Famalicão recalled him from his loan spell at Galatasaray on 21 January 2022, after he played only two games for the Turkish outfit.

== International career ==
Born in Brazil, Assunção spent his youth in Portugal and Spain and holds passports to all three countries. He was called up to the Brazil national under-17 football team in 2016.

== Personal life ==
Assunção is the son of the Brazilian retired footballer Paulo Assunção. His maternal grandfather was born in Pombal, Portugal, and through him Assunção holds Portuguese citizenship.

== Career statistics ==
=== Club ===
As of match played 11 October 2026

Appearances and goals by club, season and competition
Club	Season	League			National cup		League cup		Continental		Other		Total	
Club	Season	Division	Apps	Goals	Apps	Goals	Apps	Goals	Apps	Goals	Apps	Goals	Apps	Goals
Famalicão	2019–20	Primeira Liga	30	0	6	0	1	0	—		—		37	0
Famalicão	2020–21	Primeira Liga	26	1	2	0	0	0	—		—		28	1
Famalicão	2021–22	Primeira Liga	14	0	0	0	2	0	—		—		16	0
Famalicão	2022–23	Primeira Liga	22	1	3	0	2	0	—		—		27	1
Famalicão	2023–24	Primeira Liga	20	0	1	0	0	0	—		—		21	0
Famalicão	Total		112	2	12	0	5	0	—		—		129	2
Galatasaray (loan)	2021–22	Süper Lig	2	0	0	0	—		0	0	—		2	0
AVS	2024–25	Primeira Liga	25	4	1	0	—		—		—		26	4
AVS	2025–26	Primeira Liga	10	0	2	0	—		—		—		12	0
Apollon Limassol	2025–26	Cypriot First Division	10	1	3	1	—		—		—		13	2
Apollon Limassol	2026–27	Cypriot First Division	5	1	0	0	—		1	0	—		6	1
Apollon Limassol	Total		15	2	3	1	0	0	1	0	0	0	19	3
Career total			164	8	18	1	5	0	1	0	0	0	188	9
