= Fadıl Koşutan =

Turkish association football coach and former player

Personal information
- Full name: Fadıl Koşutan
- Date of birth: 7 June 1974 (age 52)
- Place of birth: Istanbul, Turkey
- Position: Goalkeeper

Team information
- Current team: Galatasaray (goalkeeping coach)

Youth career
- 1995–1996: Karamürselspor

Senior career*
Years	Team	Apps	(Gls)
1996–1999	Pendikspor		
1996–1997	→ Kastamonuspor (loan)		
1999–2002	Darıca GB		
1999–2000	Yıldırım Bosnaspor		
2002–2005	Pendikspor		
2005–2006	Gaziosmanpaşa SK		
2006–2007	Alibeyköyspor		
2007–2009	Beylerbeyi SK		
2009–2010	Tepecikspor		

Managerial career
- 2013–: Galatasaray (goalkeeping coach)
- * Club domestic league appearances and goals

Fadıl Koşutan (born 7 June 1974) is a Turkish association football coach and former player.

== Coaching career ==
He started his coaching career on 13 September 2013 as the assistant coach of Galatasaray U16 team. He became the A team goalkeeper coach on 25 November 2013 as assistant to Brazilian goalkeeping coach Cláudio Taffarel. He took part in the team of Fatih Terim, Hamza Hamzaoğlu, Jan Olde Riekerink, Roberto Mancini, Igor Tudor, Mustafa Denizli, Cesare Prandelli, Domènec Torrent and Okan Buruk.

== Honours ==
=== Coach ===
Galatasaray

- Süper Lig: 2012–13, 2014–15, 2017–18, 2018–19, 2022–23, 2023–24, 2024–25, 2025–26
- Turkish Cup: 2013–14, 2014–15, 2015–16, 2018–19, 2024–25
- Turkish Super Cup: 2013, 2015, 2016, 2019, 2023
