= Atalay Babacan =

Turkish footballer

Personal information
- Date of birth: 28 June 2000 (age 26)
- Place of birth: Denizli, Turkey
- Height: 1.74 m (5 ft 9 in)
- Position: Midfielder

Team information
- Current team: Ümraniyespor
- Number: 20

Youth career
- 2013–2014: Denizlispor
- 2014–2019: Galatasaray

Senior career*
Years	Team	Apps	(Gls)
2019–2023	Galatasaray	3	(0)
2020–2021	→ Adanaspor (loan)	29	(3)
2022	→ Ümraniyespor (loan)	7	(0)
2022–2023	→ Sarıyer (loan)	27	(1)
2023	Boluspor	1	(0)
2023–	Ümraniyespor	71	(5)

International career^{‡}
2017	Turkey U17	14	(6)
2019–2020	Turkey U19	8	(0)
- * Club domestic league appearances and goals as of 6 May 2026 ‡ National team caps and goals as of 1 June 2021

Atalay Babacan (born 28 June 2000) is a Turkish professional footballer who plays as a midfielder for the Turkish club Ümraniyespor in the TFF First League.

== Club career ==
=== Galatasaray ===
In 2015, he transferred to Galatasaray infrastructure. Playing for Galatasaray U-16, U-17 and U-21 teams, Babacan signed a 3-year official contract with Galatasaray on 8 October 2018. He played his first official game against Galatasaray on 5 December 2018, in the 5th round match of the Turkish Cup, at Keçiörengücü away. The young star, who stayed on the field for 65 minutes, scored the first goal of his team in the match that Galatasaray won 2–1.

==== Ümraniyespor (loan) ====
On 26 January 2022, Galatasaray announced that the 21-year-old football player was loaned to Ümraniyespor, one of the TFF First League teams, until the end of the season.

==== Sarıyer (loan) ====
On 8 September 2022, he signed a 1-year loan contract with TFF Second League team Sarıyer.
