= Berk Balaban =

Turkish footballer

Personal information
- Date of birth: 1 January 2000 (age 26)
- Place of birth: Istanbul, Turkey
- Height: 1.98 m (6 ft 6 in)
- Position: Goalkeeper

Team information
- Current team: Isparta 32 Spor

Youth career
- 2012–2020: Galatasaray

Senior career*
Years	Team	Apps	(Gls)
2019–2024	Galatasaray	0	(0)
2020–2021	→ Ankaraspor (loan)	7	(0)
2022	→ Niğde Anadolu (loan)	1	(0)
2022–2023	→ İskenderun (loan)	9	(0)
2023–2024	→ Isparta 32 Spor (loan)	4	(0)
2024–	Isparta 32 Spor	0	(0)
- * Club domestic league appearances and goals as of 19:02, 23 August 2023 (UTC) ‡ National team caps and goals as of 19:42, 5 August 2021 (UTC)

Berk Balaban (born 1 January 2000) is a Turkish professional footballer who plays as a goalkeeper for the Turkish club Isparta 32 Spor in the TFF Second League.

== Career ==
=== Galatasaray ===
Balaban is a youth product of Galatasaray, and signed his first professional contract with the club in 2019.

==== Ankaraspor (loan) ====
After a season as Galatasaray's reserve goalkeeper, he went on loan with Ankaraspor for the 2020–21 season.

==== Return to Galatasaray ====
He made his professional debut with Galatasaray in a 1–1 UEFA Europa League tie with St Johnstone F.C., coming on as a substitute in the 55th minute as the starting goalkeeper Fernando Muslera got a red card.

==== Niğde Anadolu (loan) ====
On 8 February 2022, Balaban was loaned to TFF Second League club Niğde Anadolu for the rest of the season.

==== İskenderun FK (loan) ====
On 23 August 2022, Galatasaray was leased to the TFF Second League team İskenderun for 1 year.

==== Isparta 32 Spor (loan) ====
He signed a one-year temporary contract with Isparta 32 Spor on 23 August 2023.
