= Işık Kaan Arslan =

Turkish footballer (born 2001)

Personal information
- Date of birth: 28 January 2001 (age 25)
- Place of birth: Bahçelievler, Istanbul, Turkey
- Height: 1.86 m (6 ft 1 in)
- Position: Centre-back

Team information
- Current team: Sarıyer

Youth career
- 2012–2019: Galatasaray

Senior career*
Years	Team	Apps	(Gls)
2019–2024	Galatasaray	1	(0)
2020–2021	→ Ergene Velimeşe (loan)	17	(1)
2022–2023	→ Sarıyer (loan)	24	(1)
2023–2024	→ Fethiyespor (loan)	14	(0)
2024	→ Vanspor (loan)	9	(0)
2024–2026	Boluspor	42	(0)
2026–	Sarıyer	0	(0)

International career
2017	Turkey U16	2	(0)
2017–2018	Turkey U17	13	(0)
2018–2019	Turkey U18	11	(0)
2019	Turkey U19	6	(0)
- * Club domestic league appearances and goals as of 6 May 2026

Işık Kaan Arslan (born 28 January 2001) is a Turkish professional footballer who plays as a centre-back for TFF First League club Sarıyer.

== Professional career ==
=== Galatasaray ===
A youth product of Galatasaray since 2012, Arslan signed his first professional contract with the club on 23 August 2019. He made his professional debut with Galatasaray in a 1-0 Süper Lig loss to Giresunspor on 8 January 2022, where he was subbed off in the 18th minute due to an injury.

==== Ergene Velimeşe (loan) ====
He began his senior career on loan with Ergene Velimeşe in the TFF Second League for the 2020–21 season.

==== Sarıyer (loan) ====
On 17 August 2022, Galatasaray was leased to the TFF Second League team Sarıyer for 1 year.

==== Fethiyespor (loan) ====
On 20 July 2023, Galatasaray was leased to the TFF Second League team Fethiyespor for 1 year.

=== Boluspor ===
On July 31, 2024, it was announced that he was transferred to Boluspor.

== International career ==
Arslan is a youth international for Turkey, having represented the Turkey U16s, U17s, U18, and U19s.
