= Emirhan Civelek =

Turkish footballer

Personal information
- Full name: Ramazan Emirhan Civelek
- Date of birth: 5 January 2000 (age 26)
- Place of birth: Devrek, Turkey
- Height: 1.70 m (5 ft 7 in)
- Position: Rightback

Youth career
- 2011–2019: Galatasaray

Senior career*
Years	Team	Apps	(Gls)
2019–2021	Galatasaray	0	(0)
2019–2020	→ Kayserispor (loan)	1	(0)
2020–2021	→ Sakaryaspor (loan)	1	(0)
2021	→ Akhisar Belediyespor (loan)	0	(0)
2021–2022	İskenderunspor	0	(0)
2022	Niğde Anadolu	9	(0)
2022–2023	Adıyaman FK	0	(0)

International career^{‡}
2015	Turkey U15	7	(0)
2015–2016	Turkey U16	10	(0)
2016–2017	Turkey U17	24	(1)
2017–2018	Turkey U18	9	(1)
2018–2019	Turkey U19	4	(0)
- * Club domestic league appearances and goals as of 31 May 2023 ‡ National team caps and goals as of 30 December 2019

Ramazan Emirhan Civelek (born 5 January 2000) is a Turkish professional footballer who plays as a rightback.

== Professional career ==
On 14 July 2019, Civelek joined Kayserispor on a season-long loan from Galatasaray. Civelek made his professional debut for Kayserispor in a 6-2 Süper Lig loss to Trabzonspor on 28 December 2019.
