= Domènec Torrent =

Spanish footballer and manager

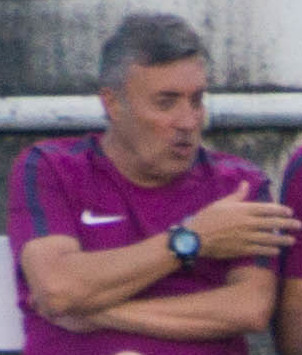

Personal information
- Full name: Domènec Torrent Font
- Date of birth: 14 July 1962 (age 64)
- Place of birth: Santa Coloma de Farners, Spain
- Height: 1.74 m (5 ft 8 1/2 in)
- Position: Midfielder

Youth career
- Farners

Senior career*
Years	Team	Apps	(Gls)
1980–1983	Olot		
1983–1989	Guíxols		

Managerial career
- 1991–1996: Farners
- 1996–1997: Cassà
- 1997–1998: Roses
- 1998–2003: Palafrugell
- 2003–2004: Palamós
- 2005–2006: Girona
- 2018–2019: New York City
- 2020: Flamengo
- 2022: Galatasaray
- 2024–2025: Atlético San Luis
- 2025–2026: Monterrey
- * Club domestic league appearances and goals

Domènec Torrent Font (born 14 July 1962) is a Spanish professional football manager and former player.

After playing and coaching at an amateur level, Torrent became an assistant to Pep Guardiola at Barcelona, Bayern Munich and Manchester City. He then managed in his own right at New York City, Flamengo, and Galatasaray.

== Playing career ==
Born in Santa Coloma de Farners, Girona, Catalonia, Torrent played as a midfielder. He joined Olot in 1980 from hometown side Farners; Olot paid for his transfer by arranging a friendly against his former club. He left Olot in 1983, and subsequently joined Guíxols, where he retired at the age of just 27 to become a coach.

== Managerial career ==
=== Early career ===
Torrent started his coaching career in 1991 with hometown side Farners, and led the club to a promotion to Regional Preferente (sixth tier) in 1994. He announced that he would leave the club in May 1996, and subsequently took over Cassà also in the sixth level in July. In July 1997, Torrent was appointed in charge of Roses, still in division six. He offered his resignation in November, which was refused by the club's board, but was still sacked the following January.

In May 1998, Torrent was named manager of Palafrugell in the Primera Catalana; with the side he achieved promotion to Tercera División in 2000, and led the club to a sixth position in the 2001–02 campaign, the best of their history. In July 2003, Torrent was appointed manager of Segunda División B side Palamós, but suffered relegation at the end of the season; he subsequently left the club the following May. On 29 March 2005, he was named manager of fellow third division strugglers Girona, replacing Josep María Nogués, but was unable to avoid the drop.

=== Working with Guardiola ===
In 2007, after managing Girona, Torrent joined Pep Guardiola's staff at Barcelona B, initially to work in as a tactical analyst. After the promotion to the third division and Guardiola's subsequent appointment as manager of the first team in May 2008, Torrent also went up to the first team under the same role. Torrent remained with Guardiola as the latter moved to Bayern Munich and Manchester City, winning 24 trophies in eleven years together.

=== New York City ===
On 11 June 2018, citing a desire to return to head coaching, Torrent was named the new head coach at Major League Soccer side New York City FC, replacing Patrick Vieira. He signed a three-year contract through the 2020 season. His debut was on 24 June, as NYCFC defeated Toronto FC 2–1 at Yankee Stadium. In 2018, under his leadership, the team reached the Conference Semifinals of the MLS Cup playoffs.

On 8 November 2019, New York City FC and Torrent mutually agreed to part ways. He left the club after achieving a franchise record of 64 points in the 2019 campaign, also qualifying for the ensuing CONCACAF Champions League.

=== Flamengo ===
On 31 July 2020, Torrent was named in charge of Campeonato Brasileiro Série A reigning champions Flamengo after agreeing to a one-and-a-half-year contract. At Flamengo he won 15 games in 26 matches, 5 draws and 6 defeats. In the Copa Libertadores, the defending champions won their group on 17 september.

On 9 November, after a loss against Atlético Mineiro, Torrent was relieved of his duties at the third-placed team.

=== Galatasaray ===
On 11 January 2022, Galatasaray chairman Burak Elmas announced that Torrent would replace Fatih Terim as the new manager of Galatasaray. With the Turkish club, he reached the round of 16 of the UEFA Europa League, where he was eliminated by his former team FC Barcelona, on 17 March 2022. On 21 June 2022, Torrent was sacked after series of poor performances and worst record of club in its history under Torrent's guidance.

=== Atlético San Luis ===
On 15 May 2024, Torrent became the head coach of Liga MX club Atlético San Luis. On 29 April 2025, Torrent stepped down from his position.

=== Monterrey ===
On 21 May 2025, Monterrey announced Torrent as their new head coach. On 2 March 2026, he was relieved of his duties.

== Personal life ==
Torrent is the grandson of a former Barcelona player.

== Managerial statistics ==
As of 28 February 2026

Managerial record by team and tenure
Team	Nat	From	To	Record								Ref
Team	Nat	From	To	G	W	D	L	GF	GA	GD	Win %	Ref
New York City	(United States)	12 June 2018	8 November 2019	60	29	15	16	104	76	+28	48.33	—
Flamengo	(Brazil)	31 July 2020	9 November 2020	26	15	5	6	46	38	+8	57.69	—
Galatasaray	(Turkey)	14 January 2022	21 June 2022	20	7	5	8	28	31	−3	35.00	—
Atlético San Luis	(Mexico)	15 May 2024	29 April 2025	40	17	5	18	56	62	−6	42.50	—
Monterrey	(Mexico)	21 May 2025	1 March 2026	38	16	9	13	61	53	+8	42.11	—
Career totals				184	84	39	61	295	260	+35	45.65	—

== Honours ==
=== Assistant coach ===
Barcelona B

- Tercera División: 2007–08

Barcelona

- La Liga: 2008–09, 2009–10, 2010–11
- Copa del Rey: 2008–09, 2011–12
- Supercopa de España: 2009, 2010, 2011
- UEFA Champions League: 2008–09, 2010–11
- UEFA Super Cup: 2009, 2011
- FIFA Club World Cup: 2009, 2011

Bayern Munich

- Bundesliga: 2013–14, 2014–15, 2015–16
- DFB-Pokal: 2013–14, 2015–16
- UEFA Super Cup: 2013
- FIFA Club World Cup: 2013

Manchester City

- Premier League: 2017–18
- EFL Cup: 2017–18
