= 2020 Dalian Professional F.C. season =

Dalian Pro
- Chairman: Zhang Lin
- Manager: Rafael Benitez
- Stadium: Jinzhou Stadium
- Chinese Super League: Group A: 7th
- CSL Relegation Stage: 12th
- FA Cup: First round
- Top goalscorer: Salomón Rondón (9)
Home colours	Away colours

The 2020 Dalian Professional F.C. season was the 11th season in club history.

== Overview ==
=== Preseason (until July) ===
On 21 January 2020, Wanda Group announced officially switched to new team name Dalian Professional Football Club (Chinese: 大连人职业足球俱乐部), or Dalian Pro F.C. (Chinese: 大连人队), and came up with a new emblem design featuring a vintage Dalian Wanda F.C. logo. On the final day of the winter transfer window, Yannick Carrasco rejoined Atlético Madrid on loan until the end of the La Liga season.

In February, the start of the 2020 Chinese Super League season was postponed due to the coronavirus pandemic. Dalian Pro was in Murcia, Spain at the time for pre-season and were forced to extend their stay within Spain as ll travel to China was suspended. In March, as the coronavirus began spreading through Spain and the rest of Europe, Dalian Pro managed to fly back to China. Benitez with two new signings Sam Larsson and Marcus Danielson flew to Hong Kong for visas but they were initially unsuccessful and the two players went back to Sweden to train with IFK Göteborg and Djurgårdens IF respectively.

On 30 May, Tao Qianglong went out for drinking with 5 other players when training with China U-19 national team, which broke the national team regulation. All six players received 6-month suspensions from club games, and were each banned from China national teams. Dalian Pro downgraded him to the reserve team.

On 11 June, Dalian Pro became the first CSL team to obtain visas for foreign players after the ban.

=== July ===
On 1 July 2020, Chinese Football Association announced the 2020 season to resume on 25 July. Teams were divided in two groups to compete in two cities, Dalian and Suzhou, while audiences were not allowed. Dalian Sports Center, Jinzhou Stadium and Dalian Pro Soccer Academy Base were selected as hosting stadiums.

During the first match against Shandong Luneng, Rondon scored the first goal in this season, and Danielson had his debut goal, but Dalian was still defeated by a Marouane Fellaini hat-trick.

=== August ===
As the first cycle of the regular season finished by the end of August, Dalian Pro could not acquire a single win out of 7 games, resulting 3 draws, 4 losses, 10 goals scored, and 14 conceded. Ten of the fourteen goals allowed were conceded after the 70th minute of matches.

The club's first victory of the season came on 29 August against Shandong Luneng with Lin Liangming scoring the only goal of the game. This was also Dalian's first win without Carrasco in the starting eleven since 2018 (five matches in 2018, five in 2019, and seven in 2020).

=== September ===
Danielson's head was lacerated against Guangzhou R&F. His absence brought another two losses, which locked Dalian Pro down at 7th position, to compete in the relegation stage.

=== October ===
For the October FIFA calendar, Hamsik left the team to join the Slovakia national team. As the strict quarantine policy for foreigners entering China was still active, he might miss most secondary stage matches upon his return, so Dalian Pro removed him from the squad, and signed Jailson instead. Rondon, however, stayed with the team. He was called up by the Venezuela national team, and he intended to leave, too. But FIFA continued the policy that allowed clubs to not release the player just before his departure, while Dalian Pro and Benitez relied heavily upon his attacking role, so he eventually stayed.

Dalian Pro Women's F.C. completed 2020 season at 3rd place in the Chinese Women's Football League.

Dalian Pro overpowered the first opponent Shijiazhuang Ever Bright in the relegation stage by 3-2 aggregate. Sun Guowen scored in the first loss, while Lin Liangming and Wang Yaopeng both scored decisive header in the second leg. Dalian Pro ensured a position above 12th, that the team were safely prevented from relegation. Rondon returned to Venezuela after this match to prepare for incoming national team games.

=== November ===
Dalian acquired an easy win from Guangzhou R&F. Danielson was called up by Sweden national team, and left the team after this match. Larsson would also enjoy his early vacation, as he got his fourth yellow card before the last match. With only two foreign players against four, Dalian shamefully lost by 4–3 in aggregate eventually. Local media described this loss ironically as a "Reversed Miracle of Istanbul".

=== Summary ===

Most capped formation

Dalian Pro registered more young players than other teams, and put multiple experienced elder players in the reserves, which was considered "youth storm" by most media. However, the newly registered young players seldom gained chances to play. Throughout the season, Tong Lei and Lin Liangming had impressive performances as under-23 players, but for other young players under 23, only those with previous appearances in the 2019 season were occasionally used as substitution. On one hand, the team was under the pressure of relegation, a risky situation to use young players. On the other hand, the special season allowed teams to use up to 4 foreign players, which further seized playing time of domestic players. Anyway, this situation was often criticized by local media, especially when the team faced difficulties or had unsatisfactory results, and had to use elder players like Zhao Xuri, Zheng Long and Sun Bo. However, Benitez explained his point of view in many press conferences and his personal blog, that result of the 2020 season was unimportant, and that young players needed time to gain experience.

Benitez switched to 4-defender based tactic in this season with the signing of Marcus Danielson. In most conditions, a 4-5-1 formation would be used, with Rondon serving as the single striker. Great improvements on passing and crossing could be seen comparing with last season, especially Tong Lei's long passes and crosses. Sam Larsson was considered a downgraded replacement for Carrrasco at first due to the new restriction of transfer fee, but he displayed various skills and strong spirit, and proved to be a worthy foreign player for the team. Together with Danielson, they were described to have "continued the impressive tradition of Swedish players in club history". In the first stage, the team covered more distance in total, while Hamsik and Rondon topped player running distance. On the other hand, the team relied heavily on Rondon, Larsson and Hamsik, and lacked other scoring tactics when either of them was absent.

== Squad ==
=== First team squad ===
As of 5 October 2020

No.	Name	Nat.	Place of birth	Date of birth (age)	Joined	From	Ends	Note
Goalkeepers
1	Zhang Chong	(China)	(China) Dalian	25 November 1987 (aged 32)	2013	Dalian Shide	Dec 2021	
19	Xue Qinghao ^{U21}	(China)	(China) Qingdao	26 September 2000 (aged 19)	2020	Liaoning		
23	Li Xuebo	(China)	(China) Dalian	15 November 1999 (aged 20)	2019	(Spain) Atlético Madrid B	Dec 2022	
32	Xu Jiamin	(China)	(China) Shanghai	11 April 1994 (aged 26)	2020	Beijing Renhe		
Defenders
3	Shan Pengfei	(China)	(China) Dalian	7 May 1993 (aged 27)	2012	Dalian Yifang youth		
4	Li Shuai	(China)	(China) Shenyang	18 June 1995 (aged 25)	2016	(Portugal) Mafra	Dec 2023	
11	Sun Guowen	(China)	(China) Dalian	30 September 1993 (aged 26)	2013	Dalian Shide	Dec 2021	
13	Wang Yaopeng	(China)	(China) Dalian	18 January 1995 (aged 25)	2014	Liaoning youth	Dec 2021	
14	Huang Jiahui	(China)	(China) Bozhou	7 October 2000 (aged 19)	2019	Dalian Yifang youth	Dec 2023	
16	Tong Lei	(China)	(China) Quzhou	16 December 1997 (aged 22)	2020	Zhejiang Greentown	Dec 2022	
18	He Yupeng	(China)	(China) Anshan	5 December 1999 (aged 20)	2019	Dalian Yifang youth	Dec 2023	
22	Dong Yanfeng	(China)	(China) Dalian	11 February 1996 (aged 24)	2016	Liaoning youth	Dec 2021	
25	Li Jianbin ^{MI}	(China)	(China) Binzhou	19 April 1989 (aged 31)	2019	Shanghai Shenhua	Dec 2020	
30	Marcus Danielson	(Sweden)	(Sweden) Eskilstuna	8 April 1989 (aged 31)	2020	(Sweden) Djurgårdens IF		
33	Wang Xianjun	(China)	(China) Dalian	1 June 2000 (aged 20)	2020	Dalian Pro youth		
36	Zhou Xiao ^{U21}	(China)	(China) Nanchong	17 May 1999 (aged 21)	2019	(Spain) Atlético Astorga	Dec 2023	
37	Yang Haoyu ^{MI}	(China)	(China) Kunming	31 July 2000 (aged 20)	2020	Hubei Chufeng United	Dec 2020	
60	Yang Pengju ^{U21}	(China)	(China) Guiyang	6 June 2000 (aged 20)	2020	Dalian Pro youth		
Midfielders
5	Wu Wei	(China)	(China) Xinxiang	5 February 1997 (aged 23)	2020	Tianjin Tianhai	Dec 2025	
7	Zhao Xuri	(China)	(China) Dalian	3 December 1985 (aged 34)	2019	Tianjin Quanjian	Dec 2021	Vice-Captain
10	Sam Larsson	(Sweden)	(Sweden) Gothenburg	10 April 1993 (aged 27)	2020	(Netherlands) Feyenoord		
12	Jailson Siqueira ^{MI}	(Brazil)	Caçapava do Sul	7 September 1995 (aged 25)	2020	(Turkey) Fenerbahçe		
20	Wang Jinxian	(China)	(China) Wuhan	12 January 1996 (aged 24)	2014	Dalian Yifang youth	Dec 2021	
26	Cui Ming'an	(China)	(China) Dalian	15 November 1994 (aged 25)	2014	Dalian Yifang youth		
27	Cheng Hui	(China)	(China) Dalian	2 August 1997 (aged 22)	2019	(Spain) Lleida Esportiu B	Dec 2023	
28	Lin Liangming	(China)	(China) Shantou	4 June 1997 (aged 23)	2020	(Portugal) Gondomar	Dec 2020	
29	Sun Bo	(China)	(China) Dalian	22 January 1991 (aged 29)	2011	Shandong Luneng youth		
31	Zheng Long	(China)	(China) Qingdao	15 April 1988 (aged 32)	2019	Guangzhou Evergrande		
35	Zhang Jiansheng ^{MI}	(China)	(China) Xingtai	30 December 1999 (aged 20)	2020	Dalian Pro youth		
40	Zhu Jiaxuan ^{U21}	(China)	(China) Dalian	13 April 1999 (aged 21)	2020	Dalian Pro youth		
42	Wang Tengda ^{U21}	(China)	(China) Dalian	18 February 2001 (aged 19)	2020	Dalian Pro youth		
50	Wang Zhen'ao ^{U21}	(China)	(China) Wuhan	10 August 1999 (aged 20)	2020	Dalian Pro youth		
17	Marek Hamšík ^{MO}	(Slovakia)	Banská Bystrica	27 July 1987 (aged 32)	2019	(Italy) Napoli	Dec 2021	Captain
Forwards
9	Salomón Rondón	(Venezuela)	Caracas	16 September 1989 (aged 30)	2019	(England) West Bromwich Albion	Dec 2022	
21	Emmanuel Boateng	(Ghana)	(Ghana) Accra	23 May 1996 (aged 24)	2019	(Spain) Levante	Dec 2022	
39	Shan Huanhuan	(China)	(China) Pingdingshan	24 January 1999 (aged 21)	2019	(Portugal) Vitória Guimarães B	Dec 2024	
41	Zhao Jianbo ^{U21}	(China)	(China) Dalian	7 May 2001 (aged 19)	2020	Dalian Pro youth		

- Note: In the 2020 season, CSL teams were allowed to select and use under-21 players (market as ^{U21}) without registering them in the first-team squad. Other under-21 players without the mark were registered normally.

During the mid-season transfer, some players were moved out (marked as ^{MO}) and in (marked as ^{MI}) of the squad.

=== Reserve squad ===
Note: Flags indicate national team as defined under FIFA eligibility rules; some limited exceptions apply. Players may hold more than one non-FIFA nationality.

No.	Pos.	Nation	Player
—	GK	CHN	Wang Kailong
—	GK	CHN	Xue Qinghao
—	GK	CHN	Sun Wancheng
—	DF	CHN	Han Peijiang
—	DF	CHN	Li Qinghao
—	DF	CHN	Rong Linchao
—	DF	CHN	Wu Wei
—	DF	CHN	Yang Lei
—	DF	CHN	Yang Pengju
—	DF	CHN	Yang Lei
—	DF	CHN	Zhang Hui
—	DF	CHN	Zheng Bofan

No.	Pos.	Nation	Player
—	MF	CHN	Chen Rong
—	MF	CHN	Hu Jiali
—	MF	CHN	Yu Zhen
—	MF	CHN	Kong Yinquan
—	FW	CHN	Bai Yaoxu
—	FW	CHN	Liang Huan
—	FW	CHN	Lü Zhuoyi
—	FW	CHN	Zhang Jiansheng
—	FW	CHN	Zhang Yuhao
—	FW	CHN	Zhang Zimin
—	FW	CHN	Zhu Hui

No.	Pos.	Nation	Player
—	FW	CHN	Han Guangxu
—	DF	CHN	Luo Hongshi
—	FW	CHN	Aximu Aini
—	MF	CHN	Yi Tianyu
—	MF	CHN	Tao Qianglong
—	GK	CHN	Gao Tian
—	DF	CHN	Bi Guangfu
—	MF	CHN	Liu Zhipeng
—	MF	CHN	Zhang Jun
—	MF	CHN	Xie Hui

=== C Squad (not used in the season) ===
Note: Flags indicate national team as defined under FIFA eligibility rules; some limited exceptions apply. Players may hold more than one non-FIFA nationality.

No.	Pos.	Nation	Player
6	MF	CHN	Zhu Xiaogang
8	DF	CHN	Zhu Ting
12	DF	CHN	Zhou Ting
35	DF	CHN	Yang Shanping

== Coaching staff ==
As of 24 July 2020.

Position	Name	Notes
First team
Head coach	(Spain) Rafael Benítez	
Assistant coach	(Spain) Mikel Antía	
Assistant coach	(Spain) Antonio Gómez Pérez	
Fitness coach	(Spain) Francisco "Paco" de Míguel Moreno	
Goalkeeping coach	(Spain) Joaquín Enrique Valerio	
First team coach	(Croatia) Darko Matić	
Medical advisor	(China) Song Jinhua	
Team doctor	(Andorra) Jan Jungwirth	
Team doctor	(China) Yu Jiatian	
Physiotherapist	(Spain) Javier Sagaste	
Technical coach	(China) Jiang Zongyan	
Reserve and youth teams
Reserve (U-23) coach	(Spain) David Rivas Martínez	
Reserve golkeeping coach	(Spain) Jorge Bartual	
U-19 coach	(China) Lü Gang	
U-17 coach	(China) Liu Yujian	
U-15 coach	(China) Qi Xiaoguang	
U-14 coach	(China) Zou Peng	
U-13 coach	(China) Li Yang	

== Transfers ==
Due to the COVID-19, Chinese FA applied for a temporary transfer window, and was approved by FIFA.

=== Pre-season ===
==== In ====
No.	Pos.	Name	Age	Moving from	Type	Transfer fee	Date	Notes	Ref.
—	DF	(China) Liu Yingchen	26	(China) Shanghai Shenxin	Loan Return	—	31 December 2019		
—	MF	(China) Yuan Hao	22	(China) Shanghai Shenxin	Loan Return	—	31 December 2019		
—	DF	(China) Yin Jiahao	19	(China) Shenzhen Pengcheng	Loan Return	—	31 December 2019		
—	DF	(China) Zheng Jianfeng	29	(China) Dalian Chanjoy	Loan Return	—	31 December 2019		
—	MF	(China) Gao Mingxin	19	(China) Dalian Chanjoy	Loan Return	—	31 December 2019		
—	MF	(China) Han Peijiang	20	(China) Dalian Chanjoy	Loan Return	—	31 December 2019		
—	MF	(China) Ren Jiawei	19	(China) Dalian Chanjoy	Loan Return	—	31 December 2019		
—	MF	(China) Duan Yunzi	22	(China) Sichuan Longfor	Loan Return	—	31 December 2019		
—	DF	(China) Wang Liang	30	(China) Dalian Chanjoy	Loan Return	—	31 December 2019		
—	MF	(China) Li Yuqiu	21	(China) Yinchuan Helanshan	Loan Return	—	31 December 2019		
16	DF	(China) Tong Lei	22	(China) Zhejiang Greentown	Transfer	¥13.0M	20 January 2020		
5	DF	(China) Wu Wei	22	(China) Tianjin Tianhai	Transfer	¥20.0M	4 February 2020		
—	GK	(China) Xue Qinghao	19	(China) Liaoning	Transfer	Free	5 February 2020		
40	FW	(China) Wang Zhen'ao	20	(Denmark) Vejle Boldklub	Transfer	Free	26 February 2020		
—	MF	(China) Tao Qianglong	18	Hebei China Fortune	Transfer	¥20.0M	27 February 2020		
28	FW	(China) Lin Liangming	22	(Portugal) Gondomar	Loan	—	27 February 2020		
10	FW	(Sweden) Sam Larsson	27	(Netherlands) Feyenoord	Transfer	€5.0M	28 February 2020		
30	DF	(Sweden) Marcus Danielson	31	(Sweden) Djurgårdens IF	Transfer	€5.0M	28 February 2020		
32	GK	(China) Xu Jiamin	26	(China) Beijing Renhe	Transfer	¥8.0M	9 July 2020		

==== Out ====
No.	Pos.	Name	Age	Moving to	Type	Transfer fee	Date	Notes	Ref.
16	MF	(China) Qin Sheng	34	(China) Shanghai Shenhua	Transfer	Free	24 January 2020		
2	DF	(China) Zhao Mingjian	32	(China) Shanghai Shenhua	Transfer	Free	24 January 2020		
10	MF	(Belgium) Yannick Carrasco	26	(Spain) Atletico Madrid	Loan	Undisclosed	31 January 2020		
—	GK	(China) Chen Zhongyu	20	(China) Meizhou Hakka	Transfer	—	20 April 2020		
—	DF	(China) Yang Zexiang	26	(China) Shanghai Shenhua	Released	Free	19 May 2020		
—	FW	(China) Yang Fangzhi	24	(China) Zhejiang Yiteng	Transfer	Free	23 July 2020		
19	GK	(China) Yu Ziqian	35	Retired	—	—	9 July 2020		
—	MF	(China) Duan Yunzi	25	(China) Wuhan Three Towns	Transfer	Undisclosed	5 August 2020		
—	MF	(China) Li Yuqiu	25	(China) Qingdao Red Lions	Transfer	—	20 August 2020		
—	DF	(China) Liu Yingchen	27	(China) Beijing Renhe	Loan	—	20 August 2020		

=== Mid-season ===
==== In ====
No.	Pos.	Name	Age	Moving from	Type	Transfer fee	Date	Notes	Ref.
—	MF	(Belgium) Yannick Carrasco	27	(Spain) Atletico Madrid	Loan Return	—			
12	MF	(Brazil) Jailson Siqueira	25	(Turkey) Fenerbahçe	Transfer	—	18 September 2020		
37	MF	(China) Yang Haoyu	20	(China) Hubei Chufeng United	Loan	—	30 September 2020		
28	FW	(China) Lin Liangming	22	(Portugal) Gondomar	Transfer	—	22 September 2020		

==== Out ====
No.	Pos.	Name	Age	Moving to	Type	Transfer fee	Date	Notes	Ref.
—	MF	(Belgium) Yannick Carrasco	27	(Spain) Atletico Madrid	Transfer	Undisclosed	8 September 2020		
—	MF	(China) Pang Chuntao	21	(China) Guizhou Hengfeng	Transfer	—	12 September 2020		
28	FW	(China) Lin Liangming	22	(Portugal) Gondomar	End of loan	—	22 September 2020		

== Friendlies ==
=== Preseason ===
9 February 2020 Friendly	FK Haugesund	3–2	Dalian Pro	Marbella, Spain
17:00	Shuaibu Ibrahim 25'; Benjamin Källman 62'; Kristoffer Velde 77'		He Yupeng 39'; Zheng Long 88'	Stadium: Marbella Football Center

14 February 2020 Friendly	FC Orenburg	1–0	Dalian Pro	Marbella, Spain
	Đorđe Despotović 52'	Report		Stadium: Marbella Football Center

16 February 2020 Friendly	Krylia Sovetov	7–0	Dalian Pro	Marbella, Spain
	Dejan Radonjić 20', 57', 72'; Paul Anton 55'; Anton Zinkovsky 70', 75'; Srđan Mijailović 80'	Report		Stadium: Marbella Football Center

23 February 2020 Friendly	FC Ufa	4–1	Dalian Pro	Benidorm, Spain
	Daniil Fomin 10', 58'; Lovro Bizjak 41', 61'	Report	He Yupeng 80'

27 February 2020 Friendly	Dalian Pro	4–3	Real Murcia	Murcia, Spain
	Boateng 15', 40'; Rondon 68'; Zheng Long 89'	Report	José Manuel Raigal 49'; Julio Algar 58', 60'	Stadium: Pienataar Arena

2 March 2020 Friendly	Dalian Pro	0–2	Elche CF	Murcia, Spain

23 May 2020 Friendly	Dalian Pro	4–2	Liaoning Shenyang Urban	Dalian, Liaoning
	Boateng 10'; Lin Liangming 40', 65'; Cui Ming'an 75'		Qu Xiaohui (pen.); Wang Xingbo	Stadium: Dalian Pro Soccer Academy Base

4 July 2020 Friendly	Dalian Pro	1–1	Qingdao Huanghai	Dalian, Liaoning
	Rondon 22' (pen.)		Gao Xiang 4'	Stadium: Dalian Pro Soccer Academy Base

11 July 2020 Friendly	Dalian Pro	5–2	Dalian Pro Reserves	Dalian, Liaoning
	Rondon; Boateng; Lin Liangming; Sun Bo		Zhang Jiansheng; Feng Zeyuan	Stadium: Dalian Pro Soccer Academy Base

17 July 2020 Friendly	Dalian Pro	5–0	Liaoning Shenyang Urban	Dalian, Liaoning
	Zheng Long; Rondon; Sun Bo; Shan Huanhuan; Zhao Xuri			Stadium: Dalian Pro Soccer Academy Base

== Chinese Super League ==
=== Regular season ===
==== Group A table ====
Pos	Team	Pld	W	D	L	GF	GA	GD	Pts	Qualification or relegation
1	Guangzhou Evergrande Taobao	14	11	1	2	31	12	+19	34	Qualification for Championship stage
2	Jiangsu Suning	14	7	5	2	23	15	+8	26	Qualification for Championship stage
3	Shandong Luneng Taishan	14	7	3	4	19	11	+8	24	Qualification for Championship stage
4	Shanghai Greenland Shenhua	14	5	6	3	16	15	+1	21	Qualification for Championship stage
5	Shenzhen F.C.	14	5	2	7	20	20	0	17	Qualification for Relegation stage
6	Guangzhou R&F	14	4	3	7	14	28	−14	15	Qualification for Relegation stage
7	Dalian Pro	14	2	5	7	18	21	−3	11	Qualification for Relegation stage
8	Henan Jianye	14	1	3	10	14	33	−19	6	Qualification for Relegation stage

Source: CSL, Soccerway
Rules for classification:
- During season: 1) Points; 2) Goal difference; 3) Goals scored.
- After season: 1) Points; 2) Head-to-head points; 3) Head-to-head goal difference; 4) Head-to-head goals scored; 5) Scores of the weight ratio of the reserve league and youth leagues.

==== Results summary ====
Overall								Home						Away					
Pld	W	D	L	GF	GA	GD	Pts	W	D	L	GF	GA	GD	W	D	L	GF	GA	GD
14	2	5	7	18	21	−3	11	0	4	3	8	12	−4	2	1	4	10	9	+1

==== Position by round ====
Round	1	2	3	4	5	6	7	8	9	10	11	12	13	14
Ground	H	H	A	A	H	A	H	A	A	H	H	A	H	A
Result	L	D	L	D	L	L	D	W	W	D	D	L	L	L
Position	6	7	7	7	8	8	8	7	6	6	6	7	7	7

Updated to match(es) played on 27 September. Source: Results
A = Away; H = Home; W = Win; D = Draw; L = Loss

==== Fixtures and results ====
Fixtures as of 13 July 2020

26 July 2020 1	Dalian Pro	2–3	Shandong Luneng	Dalian, Liaoning
15:30 (UTC+08:00)	Dong Yanfeng (yellow card) 21'; Rondon 57'; Larsson (yellow card) 69'; Danielson 90+3'	Report	Fellaini 79', 83', 86'	Stadium: Dalian Pro Soccer Academy Base; Attendance: Not allowed Referee: Wang Di; Assistant referees: Zhang Cheng, Deng Bo; Fourth official: Gu Chunhan

31 July 2020 2	Dalian Pro	1–1	Henan Jianye	Dalian, Liaoning
20:00 (UTC+08:00)	Larsson 47'; Danielson (red card) 84'; Sun Guowen (yellow card) 89'; Zhao Xuri (yellow card) 90+7'	Report	Henrique Dourado 85' (pen.), (yellow card) 90+8'	Stadium: Dalian Pro Soccer Academy Base; Attendance: Not allowed Referee: Ai Kun; Assistant referees: Zhang Cheng, Deng Bo; Fourth official: Wei Zhen

4 August 2020 3	Jiangsu Suning	2–1	Dalian Pro	Dalian, Liaoning
20:00 (UTC+08:00)	Abuduhaimiti (yellow card) 30'; Zhou Yun (yellow card) 57'; Alex Teixeira 74'; Éder 84' (pen.); Miranda (yellow card) 87'	Report	Sun Guowen (yellow card) 11'; Dong Yanfeng (yellow card) 49'; Rondon 79'; Wang Yaopeng (yellow card) 82'; Li Shuai (yellow card) 90+5'	Stadium: Jinzhou Stadium; Attendance: Not allowed Referee: Guan Xing; Assistant referees: Xi Fei, Li Xingfeng; Fourth official: Lin Jun

10 August 2020 4	Shanghai Shenhua	2–2	Dalian Pro	Dalian, Liaoning
18:00 (UTC+08:00)	Kim Shin-wook 7'; Bai Jiajun (yellow card) 40'; Qian Jiegei 73'; Sun Shilin (yellow card) 77'	Report	Wu Wei (yellow card) 40'; Dong Yanfeng (yellow card) 51'; Rondon 66', 90+3' (pen.); Danielson (yellow card) 71'; Larsson (yellow card) 82'	Stadium: Jinzhou Stadium; Attendance: Not allowed Referee: Fu Ming; Assistant referees: Ma Ji, Yang Yang; Fourth official: Wei Zhen

15 August 2020 5	Dalian Pro	0–1	Guangzhou R&F	Dalian, Liaoning
20:00 (UTC+08:00)	–	Report	Zeng Chao (yellow card) 24'; Eran Zahavi 30' (pen.); Han Jiaqi (yellow card) 61'; Chang Feiya (yellow card) 90+1'	Stadium: Dalian Sports Center; Attendance: Not allowed Referee: Wang Di; Assistant referees: Zhang Cheng, Deng Bo; Fourth official: Xing Qi

20 August 2020 6	Shenzhen F.C.	3–2	Dalian Pro	Dalian, Liaoning
20:00 (UTC+08:00)	Gao Lin 12'; Harold Preciado 21'; Zheng Dalun (yellow card) 48'; Dai Wai Tsun (yellow card) 59'; John Mary 74' (pen.), (yellow card) 82'; Zhang Yuan (yellow card) 90+2'	Report	Li Shuai (yellow card) 38'; Hamsik (yellow card) 44', (goal) 55'; Rondon 49', (yellow card) 90+6'; Cui Ming'an (yellow card) 57'	Stadium: Dalian Pro Soccer Academy Base; Attendance: Not allowed Referee: Wang Zhe; Assistant referees: Yang Yang, Meng Xiangkun; Fourth official: Guan Xing

25 August 2020 7	Dalian Pro	2–2	Guangzhou Evergrande	Dalian, Liaoning
20:00 (UTC+08:00)	Wang Yaopeng 16'; Larsson 31'; Tong Lei (yellow card) 73'	Report	Yan Dinghao (yellow card) 21'; Mei Fang (yellow card) 52'; Paulinho 74'; Fei Nanduo 79'	Stadium: Dalian Sports Center; Attendance: Not allowed Referee: Fu Ming; Assistant referees: Yang Yang, Wu Huifeng; Fourth official: Guo Baolong

29 August 2020 8	Shandong Luneng	0–1	Dalian Pro	Dalian, Liaoning
20:00 (UTC+08:00)	Zheng Zheng (yellow card) 40'; Hao Junmin (yellow card) 69'	Report	Sun Bo (yellow card) 9'; Lin Liangming 62'; Wang Yaopeng (yellow card) 90'	Stadium: Dalian Sports Center; Attendance: Not allowed Referee: Ai Kun; Assistant referees: Wu Huifeng, Liu Xing; Fourth official: Tang Shunqi

3 September 2020 9	Henan Jianye	0–4	Dalian Pro	Dalian, Liaoning
18:00 (UTC+08:00)	Ke Zhao (yellow card) 56'; Song Boxuan (yellow card) 76'	Report	Rondon 2'; Hamsik 30'; Larsson 48'; Ke Zhao 66' (o.g.); Cui Ming'an (yellow card) 76' (yellow-red card) 84'	Stadium: Jinzhou Stadium; Attendance: Not allowed Referee: Fu Ming; Assistant referees: Ma Ji, Wu Huifeng; Fourth official: Wang Wei

8 September 2020 10	Dalian Pro	1–1	Jiangsu Suning	Dalian, Liaoning
20:00 (UTC+08:00)	Rondon 23'; Larsson (yellow card) 72'	Report	Miranda 81'	Stadium: Dalian Pro Soccer Academy Base; Attendance: Not allowed Referee: Guo Baolong; Assistant referees: Tang Rongdi, Zhang Haijun; Fourth official: Lin Jun

14 September 2020 11	Dalian Pro	1–1	Shanghai Shenhua	Dalian, Liaoning
20:00 (UTC+08:00)	Rondon 33'; Lin Liangming (yellow card) 35'; Zhang Chong (yellow card) 72'; Hamsik (yellow card) 86'	Report	Qian Jiegei (yellow card) 9'; Bi Jinhao 86'; Zhu Baojie (yellow card) 90+2'	Stadium: Dalian Pro Soccer Academy Base; Attendance: Not allowed Referee: Ai Kun; Assistant referees: Tang Rongdi, Liu Xing; Fourth official: Niu Minghui

20 September 2020 12	Guangzhou R&F	1–0	Dalian Pro	Dalian, Liaoning
20:00 (UTC+08:00)	Duško Tošić (yellow card) 20'; Huang Zhengyu (yellow card) 37'; Song Wenjie (yellow card) 81'; Ye Chugui 90+3'	Report	Rondon (yellow card) 40'	Stadium: Dalian Sports Center; Attendance: Not allowed Referee: Fu Ming; Assistant referees: Ma Ji, Tang Rongdi; Fourth official: Tang Shunqi

24 September 2020 13	Dalian Pro	1–3	Shenzhen F.C.	Dalian, Liaoning
20:00 (UTC+08:00)	Rondon 36'; Dong Yanfeng (yellow card) 48'; Tong Lei (yellow card) 50'	Report	Pouraliganji 25'; Harold Preciado 32'; Dai Wai Tsun (yellow card) 58'; Guo Wei (yellow card) 63'; Gao Lin 75'; Li Yuanyi (yellow card) 78'	Stadium: Dalian Sports Center; Attendance: 5,894 (Limited entry); Referee: Ai Kun; Assistant referees: Zhang Cheng, Wu Huifeng; Fourth official: Lin Jun

27 September 2020 14	Guangzhou Evergrande	1–0	Dalian Pro	Dalian, Liaoning
20:00 (UTC+08:00)	Shan Pengfei 48' (o.g.)	Report	Li Shuai (yellow card) 89'	Stadium: Dalian Sports Center; Attendance: 1,991 (Limited entry); Referee: Fu Ming; Assistant referees: Liu Xing, Xi Fei; Fourth official: Xing Qi

=== Relegation stage ===
==== 9th to 16th place faceoff ====
17 October 2020 9-16 1st leg	Dalian Pro	1–2	Shijiazhuang Ever Bright	Dalian, Liaoning
15:30 (UTC+08:00)	Sun Guowen 10'; Li Shuai (yellow card) 44'; Jailson (yellow card) 54'	Report	Stoppila Sunzu 31'; Liao Chengjian (yellow card) 75'; Matheus 81'; Muriqui (yellow card) 92'	Stadium: Dalian Sports Center; Attendance: 2,716; Referee: Li Haixin; Assistant referees: Guo Jingtao, Tang Rongdi; Fourth official: Wang Jing

22 October 2020 9-16 2nd leg	Shijiazhuang Ever Bright	0–2 (2–3 agg.)	Dalian Pro	Dalian, Liaoning
15:30 (UTC+08:00)	Zheng Zhiyun (yellow card) 44'; Wang Peng (yellow card) 53'	Report	Lin Liangming 21' (yellow card) 90+4'; Wang Yaopeng 45'; Jailson (yellow card) 57'; Zhang Chong (yellow card) 67'; Sun Guowen (yellow card) 73'	Stadium: Jinzhou Stadium; Attendance: 2,365; Referee: Wang Di; Assistant referees: Zhang Cheng, Zhou Fei; Fourth official: Li Haixin

==== 9th to 12th place faceoff ====
26 October 2020 9-12 1st leg	Dalian Pro	0–2	Tianjin TEDA	Dalian, Liaoning
15:30 (UTC+08:00)	Zhao Xuri (yellow card) 71'	Report	Frank Acheampong 12', 42' (yellow card) 49'; Su Yuanjie (yellow card) 38'; Qian Yumiao (yellow card) 58'	Stadium: Jinzhou Stadium; Attendance: 413; Referee: Ma Li; Assistant referees: Guo Jingtao, Meng Xiangkun; Fourth official: Zhang Xiaochen

31 October 2020 9-12 2nd leg	Tianjin TEDA	1–2 (3–2 agg.)	Dalian Pro	Dalian, Liaoning
15:30 (UTC+08:00)	Song Yue (yellow card) 36' (goal) 78'; Liu Yang (yellow card) 86'; Teng Shangkun (yellow card) 87'; Frank Acheampong (yellow card) 90'; Zhao Yingjie (yellow card) 90+3'; Zheng Kaimu (red card) 90+9'	Report	Jailson (yellow card) 10'; Lin Liangming 20'; Boateng 44'; Zheng Long (yellow card) 83'; Tong Lei (yellow card) 90+4'; Xu Jiamin (red card) 90+5'; Sun Guowen (yellow card) 86' (yellow-red card) 90+10'	Stadium: Dalian Sports Center; Attendance: 1,207; Referee: Wang Zhe; Assistant referees: Tang Rondi, Xi Fei; Fourth official: Li Haixin

==== 11th to 12th place faceoff ====
6 November 2020 11-12 1st leg	Guangzhou R&F	0–3	Dalian Pro	Dalian, Liaoning
15:30 (UTC+08:00)	Jiang Jihong (yellow card) 77'; Chang Feiya (yellow card) 83'	Report	Shan Pengfei (yellow card) 23'; Li Shuai (yellow card) 29'; Larsson 49' (yellow card) 77'; Wang Jinxian 58'; Boateng 74'	Stadium: Dalian Sports Center; Referee: (South Korea) Kim Hee-gon; Assistant referees: Guo Jingtao, Liu Xing; Fourth official: Wang Zhe

10 November 2020 11-12 2nd leg	Dalian Pro	0–4 (a.e.t.) (3–4 agg.)	Guangzhou R&F	Dalian, Liaoning
15:30 (UTC+08:00)	Dong Yangfeng (yellow card) 70'; Boateng (yellow card) 80'; Li Shuai (yellow card) 99'	Report	Li Shuai 10' (o.g.); Adrian Mierzejewski (yellow card) 30'; Duško Tošić 71'; Chen Zhizhao 85', 94'; Han Jiaqi (yellow card) 110'	Stadium: Dalian Pro Soccer Academy Base; Referee: Guan Xing; Assistant referees: XI Fei, Huang Tao; Fourth official: Fu Ming

== Chinese FA Cup ==
=== FA Cup fixtures and results ===
As of 10 September 2020

18 September 2020 1	Shandong Luneng	4–0	Dalian Pro	Dalian, Liaoning
20:00 (UTC+08:00)	Chen Kerui 8'; Róger Guedes 56'; Guo Tianyu 61'; Liu Yang 74'	Report	Zhu Jiaxuan (yellow card) 41'	Stadium: Jinzhou Stadium; Attendance: Not Allowed; Referee: Ma Li; Assistant referees: Tang Rongdi, Liu Xing; Fourth official: Fu Ming

== Squad statistics ==
=== Appearances and goals ===
No.	Pos.	Player	Nat.	Super League			FA Cup			Total		
No.	Pos.	Player	Nat.	App.	Starts	Goals	App.	Starts	Goals	App.	Starts	Goals
1	GK	Zhang Chong	(China)	17	16	0	0	0	0	17	16	0
3	DF	Shan Pengfei	(China)	5	4	0	1	1	0	6	5	0
4	DF	Li Shuai	(China)	11	11	0	1	1	0	12	12	0
5	MF	Wu Wei	(China)	11	9	0	1	0	0	12	9	0
7	MF	Zhao Xuri	(China)	10	6	0	0	0	0	10	6	0
9	FW	Salomón Rondón	(Venezuela)	16	16	9	0	0	0	16	16	9
10	MF	Sam Larsson	(Sweden)	18	18	4	0	0	0	18	18	4
11	DF	Sun Guowen	(China)	19	17	1	0	0	0	19	17	1
12	MF	Jailson Siqueira	(Brazil)	6	6	0	0	0	0	6	6	0
13	DF	Wang Yaopeng	(China)	18	14	2	0	0	0	18	14	2
14	DF	Huang Jiahui	(China)	4	1	0	1	1	0	5	2	0
16	DF	Tong Lei	(China)	19	16	0	0	0	0	19	16	0
17	MF	Marek Hamšík	(Slovakia)	14	14	2	0	0	0	14	14	2
18	DF	He Yupeng	(China)	12	3	0	1	1	0	13	4	0
20	MF	Wang Jinxian	(China)	9	5	1	1	1	0	10	6	1
21	FW	Emmanuel Boateng	(Ghana)	7	4	2	1	0	0	8	4	2
22	DF	Dong Yanfeng	(China)	10	9	0	0	0	0	10	9	0
23	GK	Li Xuebo	(China)	2	1	0	0	0	0	2	1	0
25	DF	Li Jianbin	(China)	0	0	0	0	0	0	0	0	0
26	MF	Cui Ming'an	(China)	15	6	0	1	1	0	16	7	0
27	MF	Cheng Hui	(China)	0	0	0	1	0	0	1	0	0
28	MF	Lin Liangming	(China)	14	12	3	0	0	0	14	12	3
29	MF	Sun Bo	(China)	16	8	0	0	0	0	16	8	0
30	DF	Marcus Danielson	(Sweden)	16	16	1	0	0	0	16	16	1
31	MF	Zheng Long	(China)	9	5	0	1	1	0	10	6	0
32	GK	Xu Jiamin	(China)	3	3	0	1	1	0	4	4	0
33	DF	Wang Xianjun	(China)	1	0	0	1	1	0	2	1	0
35	MF	Zhang Jiansheng	(China)	0	0	0	0	0	0	0	0	0
36	DF	Zhou Xiao	(China)	0	0	0	1	0	0	1	0	0
37	MF	Yang Haoyu	(China)	0	0	0	0	0	0	0	0	0
39	FW	Shan Huanhuan	(China)	0	0	0	0	0	0	0	0	0
40	MF	Zhu Jiaxuan	(China)	1	0	0	1	1	0	2	1	0
41	FW	Zhao Jianbo	(China)	2	0	0	1	1	0	3	1	0
42	MF	Wang Tengda	(China)	0	0	0	0	0	0	0	0	0
50	MF	Wang Zhen'ao	(China)	1	0	0	1	0	0	2	0	0
60	DF	Yang Pengju	(China)	0	0	0	0	0	0	0	0	0
TOTALS						25			0			25

=== Goalscorers ===
Rank	Player	Goals		Total
Rank	Player	Super League	FA Cup	Total
1	Salomón Rondón	9	0	9
2	Sam Larsson	4	0	4
3	Lin Liangming	3	0	3
4	Marek Hamšík	2	0	2
4	Wang Yaopeng	2	0	2
4	Emmanuel Boateng	2	0	2
7	Marcus Danielson	1	0	1
7	Sun Guowen	1	0	1
7	Wang Jinxian	1	0	1
Own goal(s)		1	0	1
TOTALS		26	0	26

Last updated: 11 November 2020.
Source: Results

=== Disciplinary record ===
No.	Pos.	Player	Super League			FA Cup			Total		
No.	Pos.	Player	Yellow card	(yellow card) (yellow-red card)	Red card	Yellow card	(yellow card) (yellow-red card)	Red card	Yellow card	(yellow card) (yellow-red card)	Red card
1	GK	Zhang Chong	2	0	0	0	0	0	2	0	0
3	DF	Shan Pengfei	1	0	0	0	0	0	1	0	0
4	DF	Li Shuai	6	0	0	0	0	0	6	0	0
5	MF	Wu Wei	1	0	0	0	0	0	1	0	0
7	MF	Zhao Xuri	2	0	0	0	0	0	2	0	0
9	FW	Salomón Rondón	2	0	0	0	0	0	2	0	0
10	MF	Sam Larsson	4	0	0	0	0	0	4	0	0
11	DF	Sun Guowen	4	1	0	0	0	0	4	1	0
12	MF	Jailson Siqueira	3	0	0	0	0	0	3	0	0
13	DF	Wang Yaopeng	2	0	0	0	0	0	2	0	0
14	DF	Huang Jiahui	0	0	0	0	0	0	0	0	0
16	DF	Tong Lei	3	0	0	0	0	0	3	0	0
17	MF	Marek Hamšík	2	0	0	0	0	0	2	0	0
18	DF	He Yupeng	0	0	0	0	0	0	0	0	0
20	MF	Wang Jinxian	0	0	0	0	0	0	0	0	0
21	FW	Emmanuel Boateng	1	0	0	0	0	0	1	0	0
22	DF	Dong Yanfeng	5	0	0	0	0	0	5	0	0
23	GK	Li Xuebo	0	0	0	0	0	0	0	0	0
25	DF	Li Jianbin	0	0	0	0	0	0	0	0	0
26	MF	Cui Ming'an	2	1	0	0	0	0	2	1	0
27	MF	Cheng Hui	0	0	0	0	0	0	0	0	0
28	MF	Lin Liangming	2	0	0	0	0	0	2	0	0
29	MF	Sun Bo	1	0	0	0	0	0	1	0	0
30	DF	Marcus Danielson	1	0	1	0	0	0	1	0	1
31	MF	Zheng Long	1	0	0	0	0	0	1	0	0
32	GK	Xu Jiamin	0	0	1	0	0	0	0	0	1
33	DF	Wang Xianjun	0	0	0	0	0	0	0	0	0
35	MF	Zhang Jiansheng	0	0	0	0	0	0	0	0	0
36	DF	Zhou Xiao	0	0	0	0	0	0	0	0	0
37	MF	Yang Haoyu	0	0	0	0	0	0	0	0	0
39	FW	Shan Huanhuan	0	0	0	0	0	0	0	0	0
40	MF	Zhu Jiaxuan	0	0	0	1	0	0	1	0	0
41	MF	Zhao Jianbo	0	0	0	0	0	0	0	0	0
42	MF	Wang Tengda	0	0	0	0	0	0	0	0	0
50	MF	Wang Zhen'ao	0	0	0	0	0	0	0	0	0
60	DF	Yang Pengju	0	0	0	0	0	0	0	0	0
TOTALS			45	2	2	1	0	0	46	2	2

=== Suspensions ===
Player	No. of match(es) served	Reason	Date(s) served	Opponent	Ref.
Tao Qianglong	–	Breaking China U-19 national team regulation	1 Jun.-30 Nov.	–	
Marcus Danielson	1	Red Card vs Henan Jianye	4 Aug.	Jiangsu Suning	
Cui Ming'an	1	Red Card vs Henan Jianye	8 Sep.	Jiangsu Suning	
Dong Yanfeng	1	4 Yellow Cards accumulated	27 Sep.	Guangzhou Evergrande	
Li Shuai	1	4 Yellow Cards accumulated	22 Oct.	Shijiazhuang Everbright	
Xu Jiamin	1	Red Card vs Tianjin TEDA	6 November	Guangzhou R&F	
Sun Guowen	1	Red Card vs Tianjin TEDA	6 November	Guangzhou R&F	
Sam Larsson	1	4 Yellow Cards accumulated	11 November	Guangzhou R&F	
