= 2019 Dalian Yifang F.C. season =

Dalian Yifang F.C.
- Chairman: Zhang Lin
- Manager: Choi Kang-hee (11 February – 1 July); Rafael Benítez (2 July – present)
- Stadium: Dalian Sports Center
- Super League: 9th
- FA Cup: Semi-finals
- Top goalscorer: League: Yannick Carrasco (17); All: Yannick Carrasco (17)
- Highest home attendance: 52,109 (27 July vs. Shandong Luneng)
- Lowest home attendance: 20,149 (23 November vs. Hebei China Fortune)
- Average home league attendance: 32,853
Home colours	Away colours

The 2019 Dalian Yifang F.C. season was the 10th season in club history.

== Overview ==
=== Preseason ===
Yifang started the winter training on 24 December 2018 in Dalian until 1 January 2019. The team moved to Kunming on 2 January for a 10-day training, before flying to Marbella, Spain for another 3-week training.

The club decided to end the contract with Bernd Schuster on 3 January. The team was close to Leonardo Jardim and he eventually refused the contract due to multiple concerns. Yifang reached agreement with Korean manager Choi Kang-hee, and officially announced it on 11 February. He was previously signed by Tianjin Quanjian (now renamed Tianjin Tianhai) by the end of the 2018 season, and Quanjian claimed his salary was beyond their ability since the owner and major investor of Quanjian was arrested for illegal MLM, thus terminated the contract. The team moved to Shanghai on 7 February for final preparations before the new season.

Yifang announced the joining of 5 players on 13 February. Wanda Group had had a long negotiation with S.S.C. Napoli on Marek Hamšík, and finally reached agreement on 14 February for a reported €15M transfer fee. Gaitán decided to leave for MSL club Chicago Fire since the team preferred a winger/striker with more offensive playing style than another midfielder upon the signing of Marek Hamšík. Zheng Long joined on a one-year loan, while Alex Akande was signed as soon as Yanbian FC claimed their bankruptcy by the end of the transfer window.

Wang Xianjun was absent from the list. As later reported, the talented defender did not sign contract and demanded transfer. Yifang eventually decided to put him back to the reserve squad.

=== March ===
The first match in the 2019 season was a mere draw against Henan Jianye, as Yang Shanping was sent off in just 37 minutes, and Carrasco claimed the team's first goal this season, as he did last year, to save the team in additional times. Qin Sheng committed a foul and accidentally fell on Henan player Henrique Dourado, to broke Dourado's right tibia. All new players except Zheng Long had their debut match. Yifang had another draw with Guangzhou R&F. Carrasco extended his scoring sheet with a penalty and a reflection shot, while Zheng Long scored his first goal 1 minutes after he was substituted in.

First home match was a one-goal defeat. Hamšík met with former teammate Paolo Cannavaro, who currently sided with his brother Fabio as Guangzhou's coaching staff.

=== April ===
Yifang started April with another defeat. Mushekwi's equalizer could not bring a victory, as the goalkeeper bumped into Zhao Mingjian's back clumsily, giving Johnathan a wide open goal. Hamšík's playing style was surrounded by controversy. He lacked dribbling and sprinting, which led to easy interceptions, and his long passes lost accuracy in this match. He was frequently compared to Nico Gaitán, whose impressive dribbling tricks made many contributions on both ends.

Yifang claimed the first victory on 15 April by overcoming great difficulties in Shandong. Mushekwi won a header. To fulfill the U23 policy, Yang Fangzhi came on at 90 minute, and went back to the bench in just 1 minute for He Yupeng. Li Shuai was sent off as he pushed opponent player in the face during a conflict. Yifang addressed him with a ¥500k fine, and sent him to the reserve team. He received an additional 6-match suspension.

Carrasco scored another reflection shot against Chongqing, but the home win slipped away as Zhao Mingjian committed a handball for a penalty. For the April 28 match with Beijing Guoan, Hamšík and Carrasco were both unfit for the game. Yifang's conservative 5-defender formation was unable to hold against the opponent, while Boateng had his first goal in a corner kick.

Noticeably, on 29 April, Wanda Group chairman Wang Jianlin officially announced the takeover of Dalian Yifang during the groundbreaking ceremony of Dalian Youth Football Training Base, a joint youth training program between Wanda Group and the government of Dalian, that the team would use neutral team name (without sponsors or owner names) in the future, as the CFA had requested.

=== May ===
Yifang saw the first home win in the FA cup against Shaanxi, with Zhu Ting scoring the only goal in his 100th appearance for the team, to advance into the 5th round. They would face Shanghai Jiading Chengfa, the only amateur team left in the cup.

Yifang gladly took 1 points away from Jiangsu Suning. Yu Ziqian entered the starting lineup as Zhang Chong had waist injury. Since his last appearance for Dalian Aerbin against Liaoning Whowin in the 2012 season, he had been absence in the Super League for 7 seasons. He was excluded from the first team at the time because of his frequent confusing blunders.

In the 11 May match, the team lost to contestant Wuhan Zall, sliding deeper into the relegation area. Shan Pengfei had a large wound on his left eyebrow when going up for a header. He received on-pitch suture with staples, and finished the 1st half.

On 19 May, Yifang overpowered Shenzhen and former manager Juan Caro. Li Jianbin was sent off at the end of 1st half. Hamšík was kicked in the face by Wang Dalong to earn a penalty, to give Carrasco his 7th goal. He Yupeng surprisingly scored Mushekwi's cross as soon as he came on the pitch at 90 minute, then immediately went off for Yang Fangzhi.

Noticeably, the club changed its registration name to "Dalian Professional Football Club" (Chinese: 大连人职业足球俱乐部) on 23 May, and the team name would be changed in the 2020 season.

A 1–0 home victory finally came on 26 May. Carrasco's corner found Hamšík for his first goal in China. He Yupeng missed a scoring chance similar to the previous game in the last few minutes. Zhao Xuebin scored twice to push Yifang further in the FA Cup. Yang Lei had his first appearance in the first team.

=== June ===
June started with another defeat, with Carrasco absence for 4 yellow cards. Li Jianbin's easy marking and a misjudged interception gave 2 goals away. Mushekwi scored Hamšík's corner in the 2nd half.

Carrasco did not return to the match against Hebei CFFC due to flight delay, and Yifang lost by 1 goal. Mushekwi received a red card for pushing Zhang Chengdong in the face, and he missed several matches for the 2019 AFCON cup as planned. Huang Jiahui had his debut match.

On 18 June, Rafael Benítez was connected with Yifang with a £12m salary offered.

On 23 June, Yifang drew with Tianjin Tianhai. Hamšík was selected captain. Boateng scored two goals for Yifang including a penalty, and later conceded an own goal. Li Shuai returned from suspension.

After three rounds without victory, Yifang defeated Beijing Renhe on 29 June. Carrasco returned to the squad and scored a penalty. Hamšík showed controlling performance since last match, and forced Chen Jie to score an own goal. Boateng scored a gift goal from Zhang Lie. He and Zheng Long both scored off-side goals later.

As the league reached halfway, Yifang ranked 10th (4 wins 5 draws 6 losses, GA:GF 19:22) at 17 points, much better than 2018 season (15th, 2W 4D 9L, 12:31, 10 points). Moreover, until the 15th round in the previous season, Yifang won only one point from away matches. In this season, on the contrary, they acquired 12 away points out of the total 15.

==== Carrasco issue ====
In the preseason training, Carrasco wanted a proof to transfer back to Europe in winter transfer after the 2019 season, while the team showed negotiable attitude. He publicly announced to stay with the team in the 2019 season.

He was put on the bench during the match against Beijing Guoan on 28 April due to a claimed influenza. As reported, he expressed reluctance to play as substitute, and contradicted the manager before the match. He made apologies consequently.

Until the end of May, Carrasco was the top goal scorer in quad, claiming 7 goals out of the total 13. He missed the match against Shanghai SIPG due to 4 yellow cards, and flew back to Europe for the June FIFA calendar ahead of time. During the FIFA calendar, Carrasco changed his attitude, showing strong desire to go back to Europe in the summer transfer window, and had transfer rumors with Arsenal. He returned to the team after the following match against Hebei CFFC due to a claimed flight delay.

On 20 June, the whole issue outbroke, as goalkeeper Yu Ziqian publicly criticized on his social media that Carrasco went on a strike during the training session, that he "stood still regardless of anyone", and that he "skipped the previous two matches on purpose". The team decided to suspend Carrasco from matches and training, unless he publicly apologize for the behaviour. No further actions including apologies were taken until the 23 June match, but Carrasco showed dissatisfaction on his social media account. Yifang withdrew the suspension on 25 June, indicating a temporary pause of this issue.

The entire issue seemed to have come to an end since Benítez's arrival, as Carrasco showed quite different competing desire, that "It's the first time I've had a good coach since I was in China".

=== July ===
Yifang made major changes in managerial staff. On 1 July, Yifang announced the resignation of Choi Kang-hee. This also extended an awkward record, that no Korean manager could finish a complete season with teams in Dalian (Park Sung-hwa with Dalian Shide, June 2010 to May 2011; Chang Woe-ryong with Dalian Aerbin, Jan–Apr 2012). One day later, Rafael Benítez was officially appointed as the manager. He said the career in China would be a challenge, and he was impressed by chairman Wang's passion and future plan on football, and made the decision after consulting Juan Caro and Gregorio Manzano. He also restarted his personal blog after a 5-year-hiatus.

On 3 July, Zhou Jun quit his job as the club director, and returned to Shanghai Shenhua. Gao Yan from Wanda Group was selected for the position.

Benítez had his debut win against Henan Jianye. Boateng scored twice again. He and Carrasco continued to extend their scoring sheet to win 3 points from Guangzhou R&F. Zhou Ting had his 400th top-tier league appearance in the match against Guangzhou Evergrande.

Yifang announced the departure of Mushekwi on 15 July. Local fans gathered at the airport to say goodbye. 4 days later, Salomón Rondón officially signed with the ream.

Carrasco scored a corner directly against Tianjin TEDA. Rondón scored on his first possession, disallowed as offside by VAR. He claimed his debut goal later, to bring one point for the team. Boateng claimed his hat-trick in the FA Cup against Tianjin Tianhai.

As the CSL summer window reached its closing date, Shan Huanhuan and 3 other young players under the Wanda "Star of Hope" project were confirmed to join the squad.

=== August ===
Boateng pulled his muscle, and Rondón's decisive substitution performance won a 3-pointer from Chongqing under hot climate. Sun Bo won a long shot and a red card upon his first starting appearance.

The quick reunion with former coach Choi Kang-hee was not pleasant, as he overpowered his former team by two easy counter-attack goals from El Shaarawy. Yifang still could not breakthrough their highest record in the FA cup, reaching semi-finals in 2013, 2018 and 2019.

=== September ===
The league would meet a few long pauses to prepare for the 2022 World Cup qualification, and the team's condition was influenced by the extra-long break. Yifang struggled in Wuhan's high humidity and temperature with insufficient fitness, and lost by 1 goal. Li Jianbin earned his second red card for kicking the ball deliberately onto the opponent after the whistle. He would be grounded for 6 matches in total, to miss the rest matches in this season.

Dong Yanfeng claimed his first super league goal against Shenzhen.

=== October ===
Li Shuai had his first national team appearance against Guam on 10 October.

On 25 October, it was announced that Dalian Yifang Women's Football Club (Dalian Yifang W.F.C., official name currently vacant), based on Dalian Under-18 women's football team, was established to meet the CFA's entry standard in 2020, and would compete in the 2019 Chinese Women's League Two, the third-tier league. Fan Yiying stepped up as the manager. On 10 November 2019, Yifang W.F.C. won by 1–0 against Donghua University in the play-off, ranked by 5th, and gained promotion into the Chinese Women's Football League.

=== November ===
Zhou Ting broke the record of the oldest appearing player at 40 years and 291 days against Hebei CFFC, which had previous been held by Rolando Schiavi (40 years 285 days) since 2013.

=== December ===
Zhao Xuebin won the reserve league top goalscorer by 19 goals.

=== Summary ===
Throughout the 2019 season, Yifang won three more points than last year, and ensured safety from relegation much earlier. The team had overall equalized performance in home and away matches, band ut with Choi, Yifang acquired three away wins out the total of four at the time.

Preferred formation of Choi

Preferred formation of Benítez

Choi Kang-hee made multiple adjustments at the beginning of the season, mainly the midfielders. He often used Carrasco as a roaming attacker, not restrained to his familiar left winger position, and spent quite some time to adjust Hamšík's role.

Benítez was aggressive at first, and he soon brought in his 5-4-1 formation, aiming to improve the defense. He moved Sun Guowen backwards as the right full back, who mostly played as a winger, and put the right back Dong Yanfeng in the CB position. With each coach, the team received four red cards respectively, being the team with the most red cards this season, as major defenders were slower at sprinting speed, and sometimes used rude fouls to stop opponent players.

== Squad ==
=== First team squad ===
As of 1 March 2019.

No.	Name	Nat.	Place of Birth	Date of Birth (Age)	Joined	From	Ends
Goalkeepers
1	Zhang Chong	(China)	(China) Dalian	25 November 1987 (aged 31)	2013	Dalian Shide	Dec 2021
19	Yu Ziqian	(China)	(China) Dalian	3 June 1985 (aged 33)	2015	Qingdao Hainiu	Dec 2019
23	Chen Junlin	(China)	(China) Beihai	5 May 1993 (aged 25)	2014	Dalian Yifang youth	Dec 2021
32	Li Xuebo	(China)	(China) Dalian	15 November 1999 (aged 19)	2019	(Spain) Atlético Madrid B	
Defenders
2	Zhao Mingjian	(China)	(China) Dalian	22 November 1987 (aged 31)	2019	Hebei China Fortune	Dec 2021
3	Shan Pengfei	(China)	(China) Dalian	7 May 1993 (aged 25)	2012	Dalian Yifang youth	Feb 2020
4	Li Shuai	(China)	(China) Shenyang	18 June 1995 (aged 23)	2016	(Portugal) Mafra	Dec 2023
8	Zhu Ting	(China)	(China) Dalian	15 July 1985 (aged 33)	2015	Wuhan Zall	Dec 2020
12	Zhou Ting	(China)	(China) Dalian	5 February 1979 (aged 40)	2017	Beijing Guoan	Dec 2019
13	Wang Yaopeng	(China)	(China) Dalian	18 January 1995 (aged 24)	2014	Liaoning youth	Dec 2021
18	He Yupeng	(China)	(China) Anshan	5 December 1999 (aged 19)	2019	Dalian Yifang youth	Dec 2023
22	Dong Yanfeng	(China)	(China) Dalian	11 February 1996 (aged 23)	2016	Liaoning youth	Dec 2021
25	Li Jianbin	(China)	(China) Binzhou	19 April 1989 (aged 29)	2019	Shanghai Shenhua	Dec 2020
35	Yang Shanping	(China)	(China) Dalian	28 October 1987 (aged 31)	2018	Tianjin Quanjian	Dec 2021
36	Zhou Xiao	(China)	(China) Nanchong	17 May 1999 (aged 19)	2019	(Spain) Atlético Astorga	
Midfielders
6	Zhu Xiaogang	(China)	(China) Dalian	6 October 1987 (aged 31)	2010	Chengdu Blades	Dec 2019
7	Zhao Xuri	(China)	(China) Dalian	3 December 1985 (aged 33)	2019	Tianjin Quanjian	Dec 2021
10	Yannick Carrasco	(Belgium)	Vilvoorde	4 September 1993 (aged 25)	2018	(Spain) Atlético Madrid	Dec 2022
11	Sun Guowen	(China)	(China) Dalian	30 September 1993 (aged 25)	2013	Dalian Shide	Dec 2021
14	Huang Jiahui	(China)	(China) Bozhou	7 October 2000 (aged 18)	2019	Dalian Yifang youth	Dec 2023
16	Qin Sheng ^{C}	(China)	(China) Dalian	2 November 1986 (aged 32)	2018	Shanghai Shenhua	Dec 2020
17	Marek Hamšík	(Slovakia)	Banská Bystrica	27 July 1987 (aged 31)	2019	(Italy) Napoli	Dec 2021
20	Wang Jinxian	(China)	(China) Wuhan	12 January 1996 (aged 23)	2014	Dalian Yifang youth	Dec 2021
24	Yang Lei	(China)	(China) Handan	22 February 2000 (aged 19)	2019	Dalian Yifang youth	Dec 2023
26	Cui Ming'an	(China)	(China) Dalian	15 November 1994 (aged 24)	2014	Dalian Yifang youth	Dec 2019
27	Cheng Hui	(China)	(China) Dalian	2 August 1997 (aged 21)	2019	(Spain) Lleida Esportiu B	
29	Sun Bo	(China)	(China) Dalian	22 January 1991 (aged 28)	2011	Shandong Luneng youth	Dec 2019
31	Zheng Long	(China)	(China) Qingdao	15 April 1988 (aged 30)	2019	Guangzhou Evergrande	Dec 2019
Forwards
9	Salomón Rondón	(Venezuela)	Caracas	16 September 1989 (aged 29)	2019	(England) West Bromwich Albion	Dec 2022
15	Shan Huanhuan	(China)	(China) Pingdingshan	24 January 1999 (aged 20)	2019	(Portugal) Vitória Guimarães B	
21	Emmanuel Boateng	(Ghana)	(Ghana) Accra	23 May 1996 (aged 22)	2019	(Spain) Levante	Dec 2022
Moved to Reserve squad during the season
5	Alex Akande	(Hong Kong)	Lagos	28 February 1989 (aged 30)	2019	Yanbian	Dec 2021
28	Zhang Hui	(China)	(China) Dalian	18 February 1997 (aged 22)	2015	Dalian Yifang youth	Dec 2020
33	Zhao Xuebin	(China)	(China) Dalian	12 January 1993 (aged 26)	2013	Dalian Shide	Dec 2020
38	Yang Fangzhi	(China)	(China) Dalian	9 April 1997 (aged 21)	2018	Dalian Yifang youth	Dec 2019

==== Left during the season ====
No.	Name	Nat.	Place of Birth	Date of Birth (Age)	Joined	From	Ends
30	Nyasha Mushekwi	(Zimbabwe)	Harare	21 August 1987 (aged 31)	2015	(South Africa) Mamelodi Sundowns	Dec 2020

=== Reserve squad ===
Note: Flags indicate national team as defined under FIFA eligibility rules; some limited exceptions apply. Players may hold more than one non-FIFA nationality.

No.	Pos.	Nation	Player
5	FW	HKG	Alex Akande
28	FW	CHN	Zhang Hui
33	FW	CHN	Zhao Xuebin
38	FW	CHN	Yang Fangzhi
41	MF	CHN	Li Qinghao
42	GK	CHN	Gao Tian
43	DF	CHN	Bi Guangfu
44	MF	CHN	Zhang Yuhao
45	DF	CHN	Yang Pengju
46	MF	CHN	Zhang Jun
47	MF	CHN	Yu Zhen
48	MF	CHN	Xie Hui
48	MF	CHN	Pang Chuntao
50	MF	CHN	Liu Zhipeng

No.	Pos.	Nation	Player
51	DF	CHN	Rong Linchao
52	FW	CHN	Han Guangxu
53	DF	CHN	Luo Hongshi
54	MF	CHN	Zhu Hui
55	GK	CHN	Wang Kailong
56	MF	CHN	Cheng Xianfeng
57	MF	CHN	Bai Yaoxu
58	FW	CHN	Aximu Aini
59	MF	CHN	Yi Tianyu
60	DF	CHN	Yang Zexiang

=== Out on loan ===
Note: Flags indicate national team as defined under FIFA eligibility rules; some limited exceptions apply. Players may hold more than one non-FIFA nationality.

No.	Pos.	Nation	Player
—	DF	CHN	Yin Jiahao (at Shenzhen Pengcheng until 31 December 2019)
—	DF	CHN	Zheng Jianfeng (at Dalian Chanjoy until 31 December 2019)
—	DF	CHN	Wang Liang (at Dalian Chanjoy until 31 December 2019)
—	MF	CHN	Gao Mingxin (at Dalian Chanjoy until 31 December 2019)
—	MF	CHN	Li Yuqiu (at Yinchuan Helanshan until 31 December 2019)

No.	Pos.	Nation	Player
—	MF	CHN	Han Peijiang (at Dalian Chanjoy until 31 December 2019)
—	MF	CHN	Ren Jiawei (at Dalian Chanjoy until 31 December 2019)
—	MF	CHN	Liu Yingchen (at Shanghai Shenxin until 31 December 2019)
—	MF	CHN	Yuan Hao (at Shanghai Shenxin until 31 December 2019)

== Coaching staff ==
As of 7 July 2019.

Position	Until 1 July	Since Benítez's arrival	Notes
Head coach	(South Korea) Choi Kang-hee	(Spain) Rafael Benítez	
Assistant coach	(South Korea) Park Kun-ha	(Spain) Francisco "Paco" de Míguel Moreno	
Assistant coach	(China) Tang Tian	(Spain) Francisco "Paco" de Míguel Moreno	
Fitness coach	(Brazil) Irwing Freitas	(Spain) Francisco "Paco" de Míguel Moreno	
First team coach	(South Korea) Kim Hyun-min	(Spain) Mikel Antía	
First team coach	(South Korea) Choi Sung-yong	(Spain) Antonio Gómez Pérez	
First team coach	(South Korea) Jung Jae-sun	(Croatia) Darko Matić	
Goalkeeping coach	(South Korea) Choi Eun-sung	(Spain) Joaquín Enrique Valerio	
Team Doctor	(Spain) Antonio Turmo Garuz	(Spain) Antonio Turmo Garuz	
Team Doctor	(Andorra) Jan Jungwirth	(Andorra) Jan Jungwirth	
Team Doctor	(Spain) Cesar	(Spain) Cesar	
Physiotherapist	(Spain) Javier Sagaste	(Spain) Javier Sagaste	
Reserve coach	(China) Li Guoxu	(Spain) David Rivas Martínez	
U-19 coach	(China) Shi Lei	(China) Lü Gang	
U-17 coach	(China) Li Huayun	(China) Li Huayun	
U-15 coach	(China) Yang Xianmin	(China) Yang Xianmin	
U-13 coach	(China) Liu Yujian	(China) Liu Yujian	

== Transfers ==
=== Winter ===
==== In ====
No.	Pos.	Name	Age	Moving from	Type	Transfer fee	Date	Notes	Ref.
—	DF	(China) Wang Wanpeng	37	(China) Dalian Transcendence	Loan return	—	31 December 2018		
—	DF	(China) Fu Yuncheng	26	(China) Dalian Chanjoy	Loan return	—	31 December 2018		
—	MF	(China) Duan Yunzi	22	(China) Sichuan Longfor	Loan return	—	31 December 2018		
16	MF	(China) Qin Sheng	33	(China) Shanghai Shenhua	Transfer	Undisclosed	13 February 2019		
31	DF	(China) Yang Shanping	31	(China) Tianjin Quanjian	Transfer	€1.31M	13 February 2019		
7	MF	(China) Zhao Xuri	33	(China) Tianjin Quanjian	Transfer	€2.62M	13 February 2019		
2	DF	(China) Zhao Mingjian	31	Hebei China Fortune	Transfer	€1.31M	13 February 2019		
25	DF	(China) Li Jianbin	29	(China) Shanghai Shenhua	Transfer	Undisclosed	13 February 2019		
17	MF	(Slovakia) Marek Hamšík	31	(Italy) S.S.C. Napoli	Transfer	€20M	14 February 2019		
21	FW	(Ghana) Emmanuel Boateng	22	(Spain) Levante UD	Transfer	€5M	20 February 2019		
—	DF	(China) Yang Zexiang	25	(China) Dalian Transcendence	Transfer	Free	25 February 2019		
31	MF	(China) Zheng Long	30	(China) Guangzhou Evergrande	Loan	Undisclosed	26 February 2019		
5	MF	(Nigeria) Alex Akande	30	(China) Yanbian	Transfer	Free	28 February 2019		

==== Out ====
No.	Pos.	Name	Age	Moving to	Type	Transfer fee	Date	Notes	Ref.
16	MF	(China) Qin Sheng	33	(China) Shanghai Shenhua	End of loan	—	31 December 2018		
25	DF	(China) Jin Pengxiang	29	(China) Beijing Guoan	End of loan	—	31 December 2018		
31	DF	(China) Yang Shanping	31	(China) Tianjin Quanjian	End of loan	—	31 December 2018		
—	DF	(China) Wang Wanpeng	37	(China) Yinchuan Helanshan	Transfer	Free	31 January 2019		
36	MF	(China) Dong Honglin	23	(China) Chongqing Dangdai	Transfer	Free	1 February 2019		
15	MF	(China) Jin Qiang	26	(China) Shenzhen F.C.	Transfer	€1.97M	14 February 2019		
68	DF	(China) Pei Zhanpeng	20	(China) Suzhou Dongwu	Transfer	Undisclosed	20 February 2019		
14	DF	(China) Yan Peng	23	(China) Shenzhen Pengcheng	Transfer	Free	26 February 2019		
21	DF	(China) Liu Yingchen	26	(China) Shanghai Shenxin	Loan	—	26 February 2019		
44	MF	(China) Yuan Hao	22	(China) Shanghai Shenxin	Loan	—	26 February 2019		
53	DF	(China) Yin Jiahao	19	(China) Shenzhen Pengcheng	Loan	—	26 February 2019		
—	DF	(China) Fu Yuncheng	21	(China) Guangzhou R&F	Transfer	Free	27 February 2019		
27	DF	(China) Zheng Jianfeng	29	(China) Dalian Chanjoy	Loan	—	27 February 2019		
48	MF	(China) Gao Mingxin	19	(China) Dalian Chanjoy	Loan	—	27 February 2019		
58	MF	(China) Han Peijiang	20	(China) Dalian Chanjoy	Loan	—	27 February 2019		
—	MF	(China) Ren Jiawei	19	(China) Dalian Chanjoy	Loan	—	27 February 2019		
—	MF	(China) Duan Yunzi	22	(China) Sichuan Longfor	Loan	—	27 February 2019		
7	DF	(China) Wang Liang	30	(China) Dalian Chanjoy	Loan	—	28 February 2019		
63	MF	(China) Li Yuqiu	21	(China) Yinchuan Helanshan	Loan	—	28 February 2019		
9	MF	(Argentina) Nicolás Gaitán	31	(United States) Chicago Fire	Released	Free	15 March 2019		
28	FW	(Colombia) Duvier Riascos	31	(Chile) Universidad Católica	Transfer	Undisclosed	28 February 2019		

=== Summer ===
==== In ====
No.	Pos.	Name	Age	Moving from	Type	Transfer fee	Date	Notes	Ref.
9	FW	(Venezuela) Salomón Rondón	29	(England) West Bromwich Albion	Transfer	€18.27M	19 July 2019		
–	MF	(China) Hu Jiali	20	(China) Shanghai Shenhua	Transfer	€2.61M	26 July 2019		
15	FW	(China) Shan Huanhuan	20	(Portugal) Vitória Guimarães B	Transfer	Undisclosed	29 July 2019		
27	MF	(China) Cheng Hui	21	(Spain) Lleida Esportiu B	Transfer	Undisclosed	29 July 2019		
32	GK	(China) Li Xuebo	20	(Spain) Atlético Madrid B	Transfer	Undisclosed	29 July 2019		
36	DF	(China) Zhou Xiao	20	(Spain) Atlético Astorga	Transfer	Undisclosed	29 July 2019		
31	MF	(China) Zheng Long	31	(China) Guangzhou Evergrande	Transfer	€2.61M	30 July 2019	Loan-to-buy	

==== Out ====
No.	Pos.	Name	Age	Moving to	Type	Transfer fee	Date	Notes	Ref.
30	FW	(Zimbabwe) Nyasha Mushekwi	31	(China) Zhejiang Greentown	Transfer	Free	15 July 2019		
31	MF	(China) Zheng Long	31	(China) Guangzhou Evergrande	End of loan	€2.61M	30 July 2019		

== Friendlies ==
=== Preseason ===
21 January 2019 Friendly	Dalian Yifang	3–0	Gibraltar United	Marbella, Spain
	Han Peijiang; Nicolas Gaitán; Yan Peng

25 January 2019 Friendly	Dalian Yifang	0–2	MOL Vidi	Marbella, Spain
16:00 UTC+1		Report	Szabolcs Huszti 65'; Stopira 90'	Stadium: Dama de Noche; Referee: Guillermo Paradas

23 February 2019 Friendly	Dalian Yifang	0–3	Shanghai Shenhua	Shanghai
15:00 UTC+8		Report	Alexander N'Doumbou 40'; Fredy Guarín 60'; Li Peng 69'	Stadium: Hongkou Stadium

== Chinese Super League ==
=== League table ===
Pos	Team	Pld	W	D	L	GF	GA	GD	Pts	Qualification or relegation
1	Guangzhou Evergrande Taobao (C)	30	23	3	4	68	24	+44	72	Qualification for AFC Champions League group stage
2	Beijing Sinobo Guoan	30	23	1	6	60	26	+34	70	Qualification for AFC Champions League group stage
3	Shanghai SIPG	30	20	6	4	62	26	+36	66	Qualification for AFC Champions League play-off round
4	Jiangsu Suning	30	15	8	7	60	41	+19	53	
5	Shandong Luneng Taishan	30	15	6	9	55	35	+20	51	
6	Wuhan Zall	30	12	8	10	41	41	0	44	
7	Tianjin TEDA	30	12	5	13	43	45	−2	41 (Note: Head-to-head results: Henan Jianye 2–3 Tianjin TEDA, Tianjin TEDA 2–0 Henan Jianye.)	
8	Henan Jianye	30	11	8	11	41	46	−5	41	
9	Dalian Yifang	30	10	8	12	44	51	−7	38	
10	Chongqing Dangdai Lifan	30	9	9	12	36	47	−11	36	
11	Hebei China Fortune	30	9	6	15	37	55	−18	33	
12	Guangzhou R&F	30	9	5	16	54	72	−18	32	
13	Shanghai Greenland Shenhua	30	8	6	16	43	57	−14	30	Qualification for AFC Champions League group stage (Note: Shanghai Greenland Shenhua qualified for the AFC Champions League group stage as Chinese FA Cup winners.)
14	Tianjin Tianhai (D)	30	4	13	13	40	53	−13	25	Dissolved at May 2020 after season 2019
15	Shenzhen F.C.	30	4	9	17	31	57	−26	21	
16	Beijing Renhe (R)	30	3	5	22	26	65	−39	14	Relegation to China League One

Source: CSL
Rules for classification:
- During season: 1) Points; 2) Goal difference; 3) Goals scored.
- After season: 1) Points; 2) Head-to-head points; 3) Head-to-head goal difference; 4) Head-to-head goals scored; 5) Scores of the weight ratio of the reserve league and youth leagues.
  (C) Champions; (D) Disqualified; (R) Relegated
  Notes:

=== Results summary ===
Overall								Home						Away					
Pld	W	D	L	GF	GA	GD	Pts	W	D	L	GF	GA	GD	W	D	L	GF	GA	GD
30	10	8	12	44	51	−7	38	6	4	5	23	20	+3	4	4	7	21	31	−10

Last updated: 1 December 2019.

=== Position by round ===
Round	1	2	3	4	5	6	7	8	9	10	11	12	13	14	15	16	17	18	19	20	21	22	23	24	25	26	27	28	29	30
Ground	A	A	H	H	A	H	A	A	H	A	H	H	A	H	A	H	H	A	A	H	A	H	H	A	H	A	A	H	A	H
Result	D	D	L	L	W	D	L	D	L	W	W	L	L	D	W	W	W	L	D	W	W	D	L	L	W	L	L	D	L	W
Position	9	10	13	13	10	10	11	12	14	11	9	11	11	11	10	10	7	9	8	8	6	6	7	8	7	8	9	10	10	9

Updated to match(es) played on 1 December. Source:
A = Away; H = Home; W = Win; D = Draw; L = Loss

=== League fixtures and results ===
Fixtures as of February 2019.

3 March 2019 1	Henan Jianye	1–1	Dalian Yifang	Zhengzhou
15:30 (UTC+08:00)	Henrique Dourado 26'; Wu Yan (yellow card) 90'	Report	Yang Shanping (yellow card) 24' (yellow-red card) 37'; Qin Sheng (yellow card) 41'; Carrasco 90+1'	Stadium: Hanghai Stadium; Attendance: 21,696; Referee: (China) Ma Ning; Assistant referees: Zhang Qiangjin, Wu Huifeng; Fourth official: Xing Qi

9 March 2019 2	Guangzhou R&F	3–3	Dalian Yifang	Guangzhou
19:35 (UTC+08:00)	Ding Haifeng (yellow card) 9'; Tang Miao (yellow card) 24'; Dia Saba 33'; Eran Zahavi 68', 90+7'; Li Tixiang (yellow card) 89'	Report	Carrasco 42' (pen.), 56' (yellow card) 90+2'; Zheng Long 86'	Stadium: Yuexiushan Stadium; Attendance: 9,309; Referee: (China) Shi Zhenlu; Assistant referees: Zhou Fei, Xi Fei; Fourth official: Jin Jingyuan

30 March 2019 3	Dalian Yifang	0–1	Guangzhou Evergrande	Dalian
16:00 (UTC+08:00)	Zheng Long (yellow card) 6'	Report	Talisca 80'	Stadium: Dalian Sports Center; Attendance: 48,919; Referee: (China) Wang Di; Assistant referees: Sun Kai, Hu Chengjun; Fourth official: Hei Xiaohu

7 April 2019 4	Dalian Yifang	1–2	Tianjin TEDA	Dalian
15:30 (UTC+08:00)	Qin Sheng (yellow card) 14'; Mushekwi 52'; Hamšík (yellow card) 62'	Report	Johnathan 15', 82' (yellow card) 36'; Maitijiang (yellow card) 45+2'	Stadium: Dalian Sports Center; Attendance: 31,889; Referee: (China) Li Haixin; Assistant referees: Ma Ji, Huang Tao; Fourth official: Xing Qi

14 April 2019 5	Shandong Luneng	0–1	Dalian Yifang	Jinan
17:30 (UTC+08:00)		Report	Carrasco (yellow card) 15'; Mushekwi 44'; Zhu Xiaogang (yellow card) 52'; Li Shuai (yellow card) 56' (yellow-red card) 76'; He Yupeng (yellow card) 90+5'	Stadium: Jinan Olympic Sports Center Stadium; Attendance: 22,175; Referee: (China) Ma Ning; Assistant referees: Zhou Fei, Zhang Cheng; Fourth official: Chen Gang

21 April 2019 6	Dalian Yifang	1–1	Chongqing SWM	Dalian
15:30 (UTC+08:00)	Carrasco 68'	Report	Yang Shuai (yellow card) 75'; Fernandinho Henrique 75' (pen.) (yellow card) 90+3'; Adrian Mierzejewski (yellow card) 90+1'	Stadium: Dalian Sports Center; Attendance: 26,618; Referee: (England) Mark Clattenburg; Assistant referees: (China) Sun Kai, Zhang Qiangjin; Fourth official: Liang Caiwei

28 April 2019 7	Beijing Guoan	4–1	Dalian Yifang	Beijing
19:35 (UTC+08:00)	Jonathan Viera 2', 43', 66'; Zhang Xizhe 20' (pen.) (yellow card) 45'; Wang Ziming (yellow card) 23'; Yu Dabao (yellow card) 40'	Report	Li Jianbin (yellow card) 13'; Zhao Mingjian (yellow card) 74'; Boateng 78'	Stadium: Workers Stadium; Attendance: 43,430; Referee: (Serbia) Milorad Mažić; Assistant referees: (China) Cao Yi, Yu Yue; Fourth official: Xing Qi

5 May 2019 8	Jiangsu Suning	1–1	Dalian Yifang	Nanjing
19:35 (UTC+08:00)	Alex Teixeira 61'	Report	Yang Shanping (yellow card) 29'; Qin Sheng (yellow card) 36'; Li Jianbin (yellow card) 50'; Carrasco 88' (pen.)	Stadium: Nanjing Olympic Sports Centre; Attendance: 20,963; Referee: (China) Wang Zhe; Assistant referees: Zhang Cheng, Yang Yang; Fourth official: Guan Xing

11 May 2019 9	Dalian Yifang	1–2	Wuhan Zall	Dalian
15:30 (UTC+08:00)	Carrasco (yellow card) 45+5' (goal) 66'	Report	Liao Junjian (yellow card) 6'; Stéphane Mbia (penalty missed) 6'; Huang Bowen (yellow card) 45+9'; Léo Baptistão 58'; Evrard 88'	Stadium: Dalian Sports Center; Attendance: 24,039; Referee: (China) Shen Yinhao; Assistant referees: Zhou Fei, Hu Chengjun; Fourth official: Ma Li

19 May 2019 10	Shenzhen FC	1–2	Dalian Yifang	Shenzhen
19:35 (UTC+08:00)	Harold Preciado 24'; Wang Dalong (yellow card) 76'; Ole Selnæs (yellow card) 90'	Report	Li Jianbin (yellow card) 35' (yellow-red card) 45+4'; Mushekwi (yellow card) 39'; Qin Sheng (yellow card) 56'; Carrasco 77' (pen.); He Yupeng 90'	Stadium: Shenzhen Universiade Sports Centre; Attendance: 16,828; Referee: (Czech Republic) Petr Ardeleánu; Assistant referees: Huo Weiming, Ma Kexi; Fourth official: Hei Xiaohu

26 May 2019 11	Dalian Yifang	1–0	Shanghai Shenhua	Dalian
15:30 (UTC+08:00)	Hamšík 55'; Carrasco (yellow card) 74'	Report		Stadium: Dalian Sports Center; Attendance: 22,619; Referee: (China) Guan Xing; Assistant referees: Sun Kai, Wu Huifeng; Fourth official: Wu Liying

2 June 2019 12	Dalian Yifang	1–2	Shanghai SIPG	Dalian
15:00 (UTC+08:00)	Qin Sheng (yellow card) 9'; Wang Yaopeng (yellow card) 36'; Mushekwi 61'; Zhu Xiaogang (yellow card) 70'; Zhu Ting (yellow card) 71'	Report	Elkeson 31'; Li Shenglong 43'; Yan Junling (yellow card) 87'	Stadium: Dalian Sports Center; Attendance: 26,919; Referee: (Uzbekistan) Ravshan Irmatov; Assistant referees: Shi Xiang, Guo Jingtao; Fourth official: Jin Jingyuan

15 June 2019 13	Hebei China Fortune	1–0	Dalian Yifang	Langfang
19:35 (UTC+08:00)	Ren Hang (yellow card) 53'; Ezequiel Lavezzi 66'; Tao Qianglong (yellow card) 90+2'	Report	Mushekwi (red card) 73'; Huang Jiahui (yellow card) 90+3'	Stadium: Langfang Stadium; Attendance: 18,326; Referee: (China) Wang Zhe; Assistant referees: Zhang Cheng, Yang Yang; Fourth official: Wang Yi

23 June 2019 14	Dalian Yifang	2–2	Tianjin Tianhai	Dalian
15:30 (UTC+08:00)	Qin Sheng (yellow card) 5'; Boateng 33', 41' (pen.); Zheng Long (yellow card) 67'; He Yupeng (yellow card) 90+4'	Report	Sun Ke 8'; Wu Wei (yellow card) 40'; Boateng 62' (o.g.)	Stadium: Dalian Sports Center; Attendance: 21,099; Referee: (England) Mark Clattenburg; Assistant referees: Zhou Fei, Zhang Qiangjin; Fourth official: Jansen Mehmetjan

29 June 2019 15	Beijing Renhe	1–3	Dalian Yifang	Beijing
19:35 (UTC+08:00)	Makhete Diop 2' (yellow card) 53'; Liu Boyang (yellow card) 90+4'	Report	Carrasco 51' (pen.); Hamšík 52'; Boateng 59'	Stadium: Beijing Fengtai Stadium; Attendance: 7,383; Referee: (China) Shi Zhenlu; Assistant referees: Shi Xiang, Mai Pan; Fourth official: Xia Jun

7 July 2019 16	Dalian Yifang	3–1	Henan Jianye	Dalian
19:35 (UTC+08:00)	Boateng 20', 54'; Carrasco 39' (pen.); Dong Yanfeng (yellow card) 90'	Report	Wang Shangyuan (yellow card) 48'; Han Xuan 62'; Ivo 71'	Stadium: Dalian Sports Center; Attendance: 32,019; Referee: (China) Gu Chunhan; Assistant referees: Su Kai, Hu Chengjun; Fourth official: Wang Di

12 July 2019 17	Dalian Yifang	3–2	Guangzhou R&F	Dalian
19:35 (UTC+08:00)	Carrasco 25' (pen.), 74'; Li Shuai (yellow card) 45+1'; Boateng 52'; Qin Sheng (yellow card) 65'	Report	Eran Zahavi 19' (pen.), 63'; Wang Peng (yellow card) 33'; Li Tixiang (yellow card) 79'; Dia Saba (yellow card) 84'; Ma Junliang (yellow card) 90+1'	Stadium: Dalian Sports Center; Attendance: 41,949; Referee: (China) Wang Zhe; Assistant referees: Zhang Cheng, Yu Yue; Fourth official: Guan Xing

16 July 2019 18	Guangzhou Evergrande	4–1	Dalian Yifang	Guangzhou
20:00 (UTC+08:00)	Paulinho 27', 83', 90+1'; Li Xuepeng (yellow card) 72'; Elkeson 90+3'	Report	Qin Sheng 11'; Boateng (yellow card) 50'; Carrasco (yellow card) 53'; Shan Pengfei (yellow card) 77'	Stadium: Tianhe Stadium; Attendance: 48,419; Referee: (Bahrain) Nawaf Shukralla; Assistant referees: Cao Yi, Tang Rongdi; Fourth official: Wang Jin

20 July 2019 19	Tianjin TEDA	3–3	Dalian Yifang	Tianjin
19:35 (UTC+08:00)	Liu Yang (yellow card) 25'; Sandro Wagner 32'; Frank Acheampong 34', 70' (pen.); Guo Hao (yellow card) 54'; Yang Qipeng (yellow card) 83'	Report	Zheng Long (yellow card) 37'; Carrasco 26', 49' (yellow card) 54'; Qin Sheng (red card) 62'; Zhu Xiaogang (yellow card) 72'; Rondón 84'	Stadium: Tianjin Olympic Center Stadium; Attendance: 20,046; Referee: (China) Shen Yinhao; Assistant referees: Huo Weiming, Mai Pan; Fourth official: Huang Yi

27 July 2019 20	Dalian Yifang	1–0	Shandong Luneng	Dalian
19:35 (UTC+08:00)	Boateng 20'; Wang Yaopeng (yellow card) 37'; Carrasco (yellow card) 63'	Report	Dai Lin (yellow card) 14'	Stadium: Dalian Sports Center; Attendance: 52,109; Referee: (China) Wang Zhe; Assistant referees: Liu Jinyu, Ma Kexin; Fourth official: Guan Xing

2 August 2019 21	Chongqing SWM	1–3	Dalian Yifang	Chongqing
19:35 (UTC+08:00)	Fernandinho 43'	Report	Qin Sheng (yellow card) 19'; Rondón 38', 63'; Wang Jinxian (yellow card) 42'; Carrasco 59'; Li Jianbin (yellow card) 71'	Stadium: Chongqing Olympic Sports Center; Attendance: 28,455; Referee: (China) Gu Chunhan; Assistant referees: Huo Weiming, Meng Xiangkun; Fourth official: Ma Li

9 August 2019 22(23)	Dalian Yifang	2–2	Jiangsu Suning	Dalian
19:35 (UTC+08:00)	Sun Bo 7' (red card) 33'; Li Jianbin 26' (yellow card) 55'	Report	Xie Pengfei (yellow card) 15'; Alex Teixeira 21'; Éder 30'; He Chao (yellow card) 38'; Luo Jing (yellow card) 62'; Wu Xi (yellow card) 63'; Abduhamit Abdugheni (yellow card) 68'; Tian Yinong (red card) 81'	Stadium: Dalian Sports Center; Attendance: 48,209; Referee: (China) Li Haixin; Assistant referees: Zhang Cheng, Bo Deng; Fourth official: Shen Yinhao

15 August 2019 23(22)	Dalian Yifang	0–2	Beijing Guoan	Dalian
19:35 (UTC+08:00)	Hamšík (yellow card) 41'	Report	Ba Dun 56'; Li Ke (yellow card) 81'; Zhang Yuning 86'	Stadium: Dalian Sports Center; Attendance: 42,998; Referee: (England) Mark Clattenburg; Assistant referees: Hu Chengjun, Guo Jingtao; Fourth official: Lin Jun

15 September 2019 24	Wuhan Zall	1–0	Dalian Yifang	Wuhan
19:35 (UTC+08:00)	Zhou Tong (yellow card) 16'; Ming Tian (yellow card) 30'; Léo Baptistão 66'	Report	Li Shuai (yellow card) 36'; Zhu Xiaogang (yellow card) 79'; Li Jianbin (red card) 90+1'	Stadium: Dongxihu Sports Centre; Attendance: 20,157; Referee: (China) Guan Xing; Assistant referees: Huo Weiming, Tang Rongdi; Fourth official: Ai Kun

21 September 2019 25	Dalian Yifang	2–0	Shenzhen FC	Dalian
15:30 (UTC+08:00)	Zheng Long 38'; Dong Yanfeng 79'	Report	Yelijiang (yellow card) 78'	Stadium: Dalian Sports Center; Attendance: 31,949; Referee: (Netherlands) Kevin Blom; Assistant referees: Dave Goossens, Cao Yi; Fourth official: Ma Li

20 October 2019 26	Shanghai Shenhua	2–1	Dalian Yifang	Shanghai
19:35 (UTC+08:00)	Aidi (yellow card) 15'; Giovanni Moreno 25'; Peng Xinli (yellow card) 35'; Odion Ighalo 38'	Report	Carrasco 1' (yellow card) 35'; Shan Pengfei (yellow card) 19'; Zhu Xiaogang (yellow card) 21'; Boateng (yellow card) 90+3'	Stadium: Hongkou Football Stadium; Attendance: 21,067; Referee: (China) Wang Zhe; Assistant referees: Liu Jinyu, Pan Mai; Fourth official: Zhao Zhizhi

27 October 2019 27	Shanghai SIPG	3–0	Dalian Yifang	Shanghai
19:35 (UTC+08:00)	Li Shenglong 14'; Zhou Ting 26' (o.g.); Oscar 90+3'	Report	Shan Pengfei (yellow card) 73'; Dong Yanfeng (yellow card) 80'; Zhou Ting (yellow card) 87'	Stadium: Shanghai Stadium; Attendance: 12,635; Referee: (Singapore) Muhammad Taqi; Assistant referees: Sun Kai, Guo Jingtao; Fourth official: Wu Liying

23 November 2019 28	Dalian Yifang	3–3	Hebei China Fortune	Dalian
15:30 (UTC+08:00)	Carrasco (yellow card) 42' (goal) 49' (pen.); Wang Yaopeng 45+1'; Dong Yanfeng (yellow card) 57'; Rondón 71' (pen.)	Report	Pan Ximing (yellow card) 25'; Marcão 31', 75' (pen.); Dong Xuesheng 85'; Javier Mascherano (yellow card) 90+2'	Stadium: Dalian Sports Center; Attendance: 20,149; Referee: (China) Guan Xing; Assistant referees: Ma Ji, Ma Kexin; Fourth official: Fu Ming

27 November 2019 29	Tianjin Tianhai	5–1	Dalian Yifang	Tianjin
19:35 (UTC+08:00)	Yang Xu 13', 45+2'; Alan (yellow card) 22' (goal) 58'; Zhang Xiaobin (yellow card) 29'; Renatinho 33' (yellow card) 38'; Song Ju-hun 35'	Report	Zhou Ting (yellow card) 41'; Cui Ming'an (red card) 76'; Zhou Xiao 90+1'	Stadium: Tianjin Olympic Center Stadium; Attendance: 12,011; Referee: (New Zealand) Matthew Conger; Assistant referees: Sun Kai, Zhang Qiangjin; Fourth official: Huang Yi

1 December 2019 30	Dalian Yifang	2–0	Beijing Renhe	Dalian
15:30 (UTC+08:00)	Rondón (penalty missed) 15' 57'; Zhou Xiao (yellow card) 39'; Carrasco 87'	Report	Du Wenyang (yellow card) 44'	Stadium: Dalian Sports Center; Attendance: 21,306; Referee: Ma Ning; Assistant referees: Hu Chengjun, Liu Jinyu; Fourth official: Xing Qi

== Chinese FA Cup ==
1 May 2019 4	Dalian Yifang	1–0	Shaanxi Chang'an Athletic	Dalian
19:30 (UTC+08:00)	Yang Fangzhi (yellow card) 9'; Zhu Ting 62'; Qin Sheng (yellow card) 87'	Report	Du Junpeng (yellow card) 88'	Stadium: Dalian Sports Center; Attendance: 8,769; Referee: (China) Liang Caiwei; Assistant referees: Yang Delin, Liu Xing; Fourth official: Sun Shengyu

29 May 2019 5	Dalian Yifang	2–0	Shanghai Jiading Boji	Dalian
19:30 (UTC+08:00)	Zhao Xuebin 79', 83'	Report		Stadium: Dalian Sports Center; Attendance: 3,678; Referee: (China) Wang Zhe; Assistant referees: Zhang Meilin, Zhang Hongwei; Fourth official: Han Lei

24 July 2019 Quarter-Finals	Tianjin Tianhai	0–4	Dalian Yifang	Tianjin
18:00 (UTC+08:00)	Wu Wei (yellow card) 77'	Report	Boateng 26', 80', 90+1' (pen.); Sun Bo 42'; Cui Ming'an (yellow card) 55'; Zhou Ting (yellow card) 74'	Stadium: Haihe Educational Football Stadium; Attendance: 6,187; Referee: (China) Ma Ning; Assistant referees: Cao Yi, Hu Chengjun; Fourth official: Ma Li

19 August 2019 Semi-Finals	Dalian Yifang	2–3	Shanghai Shenhua	Dalian
19:35 (UTC+08:00)	Hamšík 14'; Dong Yanfeng (yellow card) 55'; Zheng Long (yellow card) 76' (goal) 84'	Report	Bai Jiajun (yellow card) 26'; El Shaarawy 22', 45+2'; Giovanni Moreno 69'	Stadium: Dalian Sports Center; Attendance: 50,089; Referee: (Singapore) Muhammad Taqi; Assistant referees: Cao Yi, Ma Ji; Fourth official: Ma Ning

== Squad statistics ==
=== Appearances and goals ===
No.	Pos.	Player	Nat.	Age	Super League			FA Cup			Total		
No.	Pos.	Player	Nat.	Age	App.	Starts	Goals	App.	Starts	Goals	App.	Starts	Goals
1	GK	Zhang Chong	(China)	31	28	28	0	2	2	0	30	30	0
2	DF	Zhao Mingjian	(China)	31	7	6	0	0	0	0	7	6	0
3	DF	Shan Pengfei	(China)	25	17	16	0	3	3	0	20	19	0
4	DF	Li Shuai	(China)	23	21	21	0	2	2	0	23	23	0
5	FW	Alex Akande	(Nigeria)	30	3	0	0	1	1	0	4	1	0
6	MF	Zhu Xiaogang	(China)	31	23	23	0	2	1	0	25	24	0
7	MF	Zhao Xuri	(China)	33	9	7	0	3	2	0	12	9	0
8	DF	Zhu Ting	(China)	33	16	8	0	3	2	1	19	10	1
9	FW	Salomón Rondón	(Venezuela)	29	11	7	5	1	1	0	12	8	5
10	MF	Yannick Carrasco	(Belgium)	25	25	24	17	1	1	0	26	25	17
11	MF	Sun Guowen	(China)	25	8	7	0	2	2	0	10	9	0
12	DF	Zhou Ting	(China)	40	18	16	0	4	3	0	22	19	0
13	DF	Wang Yaopeng	(China)	24	18	16	1	3	3	0	21	19	1
14	DF	Huang Jiahui	(China)	25	1	0	0	0	0	0	1	0	0
15	FW	Shan Huanhuan	(China)	20	0	0	0	0	0	0	0	0	0
16	MF	Qin Sheng	(China)	32	21	21	1	3	3	0	24	24	1
17	MF	Marek Hamšík	(Slovakia)	31	28	28	2	3	2	1	31	30	3
18	DF	He Yupeng	(China)	20	13	1	1	1	1	0	14	2	1
19	GK	Yu Ziqian	(China)	33	2	2	0	2	2	0	4	4	0
20	MF	Wang Jinxian	(China)	23	28	22	0	4	1	0	32	23	0
21	FW	Emmanuel Boateng	(Ghana)	22	21	16	8	1	1	3	22	17	11
22	DF	Dong Yanfeng	(China)	23	15	8	1	2	2	0	17	10	1
23	GK	Chen Junlin	(China)	25	0	0	0	0	0	0	0	0	0
24	MF	Yang Lei	(China)	19	0	0	0	1	0	0	1	0	0
25	DF	Li Jianbin	(China)	29	17	17	1	2	1	0	19	18	1
26	MF	Cui Ming'an	(China)	24	5	4	0	1	1	0	6	5	0
27	MF	Cheng Hui	(China)	21	1	0	0	0	0	0	1	0	0
28	FW	Zhang Hui	(China)	22	2	0	0	0	0	0	2	0	0
29	MF	Sun Bo	(China)	28	5	1	1	2	2	1	7	3	2
30	FW	Nyasha Mushekwi	(Zimbabwe)	31	11	11	3	1	1	0	12	12	3
31	MF	Zheng Long	(China)	30	19	10	2	3	1	1	22	11	3
32	GK	Li Xuebo	(China)	20	0	0	0	0	0	0	0	0	0
33	FW	Zhao Xuebin	(China)	26	1	0	0	1	1	2	2	1	2
35	DF	Yang Shanping	(China)	31	8	8	0	1	1	0	9	9	0
36	DF	Zhou Xiao	(China)	20	2	1	1	0	0	0	2	1	1
38	FW	Yang Fangzhi	(China)	21	8	1	0	1	1	0	9	2	0
TOTALS							44			9			53

=== Goalscorers ===
Rank	Player	Goals (Penalties)		Total
Rank	Player	Super League	FA Cup	Total
1	Yannick Carrasco	17(7)	0	17
2	Emmanuel Boateng	8(1)	3(1)	11
3	Salomón Rondón	5(1)	0	5
4	Marek Hamšík	2	1	3
4	Nyasha Mushekwi	3	0	3
4	Zheng Long	2	1	3
7	Sun Bo	1	1	2
7	Zhao Xuebin	0	2	2
9	Dong Yanfeng	1	0	1
9	He Yupeng	1	0	1
9	Li Jianbin	1	0	1
9	Qin Sheng	1	0	1
9	Wang Yaopeng	1	0	1
9	Zhou Xiao	1	0	1
9	Zhu Ting	0	1	1
TOTALS		44	9	53

=== Disciplinary record ===
No.	Pos.	Player	Super League			FA Cup			Total		
No.	Pos.	Player	Yellow card	(yellow card) (yellow-red card)	Red card	Yellow card	(yellow card) (yellow-red card)	Red card	Yellow card	(yellow card) (yellow-red card)	Red card
1	GK	Zhang Chong	0	0	0	0	0	0	0	0	0
2	DF	Zhao Mingjian	1	0	0	0	0	0	1	0	0
3	DF	Shan Pengfei	3	0	0	0	0	0	3	0	0
4	DF	Li Shuai	3	1	0	0	0	0	3	1	0
5	FW	Alex Akande	0	0	0	0	0	0	0	0	0
6	MF	Zhu Xiaogang	5	0	0	0	0	0	5	0	0
7	MF	Zhao Xuri	0	0	0	0	0	0	0	0	0
8	DF	Zhu Ting	1	0	0	0	0	0	1	0	0
9	FW	Salomón Rondón	0	0	0	0	0	0	0	0	0
10	MF	Yannick Carrasco	9	0	0	0	0	0	9	0	0
11	MF	Sun Guowen	0	0	0	0	0	0	0	0	0
12	DF	Zhou Ting	2	0	0	1	0	0	3	0	0
13	DF	Wang Yaopeng	2	0	0	0	0	0	2	0	0
14	DF	Huang Jiahui	1	0	0	0	0	0	1	0	0
15	FW	Shan Huanhuan	0	0	0	0	0	0	0	0	0
16	MF	Qin Sheng	8	0	1	1	0	0	9	0	1
17	MF	Marek Hamšík	2	0	0	0	0	0	2	0	0
18	DF	He Yupeng	2	0	0	0	0	0	2	0	0
19	GK	Yu Ziqian	0	0	0	0	0	0	0	0	0
20	MF	Wang Jinxian	1	0	0	0	0	0	1	0	0
21	FW	Emmanuel Boateng	2	0	0	0	0	0	2	0	0
22	DF	Dong Yanfeng	3	0	0	1	0	0	4	0	0
23	GK	Chen Junlin	0	0	0	0	0	0	0	0	0
24	MF	Yang Lei	0	0	0	0	0	0	0	0	0
25	DF	Li Jianbin	4	1	1	0	0	0	4	1	1
26	MF	Cui Ming'an	0	0	1	1	0	0	1	0	1
27	MF	Cheng Hui	0	0	0	0	0	0	0	0	0
28	FW	Zhang Hui	0	0	0	0	0	0	0	0	0
29	MF	Sun Bo	0	0	1	0	0	0	0	0	1
30	FW	Nyasha Mushekwi	1	0	1	0	0	0	1	0	1
31	MF	Zheng Long	3	0	0	1	0	0	4	0	0
32	GK	Li Xuebo	0	0	0	0	0	0	0	0	0
33	FW	Zhao Xuebin	0	0	0	0	0	0	0	0	0
35	DF	Yang Shanping	2	1	0	0	0	0	2	1	0
36	DF	Zhou Xiao	1	0	0	0	0	0	1	0	0
38	FW	Yang Fangzhi	0	0	0	1	0	0	1	0	0
TOTALS			56	3	5	6	0	0	62	3	5

=== Suspensions ===
Player	No. of matches served	Reason	Date(s) served	Opponent	Ref.
Yang Shanping	1	Red Card vs. Henan Jianye	9 Mar.	Guangzhou R&F	
Li Shuai	1	Red Card vs. Shandong Luneng	21 Apr.	Chongqing Dangdai	
Li Shuai	6	Pushing opponent player in the face	28 Apr.–2 Jun.	–	
Li Jianbin	1	Red Card vs. Shenzhen FC	26 May	Shanghai Shenhua	
Qin Sheng	1	4 Yellow Cards accumulated	26 May	Shanghai Shenhua	
Yannick Carrasco	1	4 Yellow Cards accumulated	2 Jun.	Shanghai SIPG	
Nyasha Mushekwi	1	Red Card vs Hebei China Fortune	23 Jun.	Tianjin Tianhai	
Qin Sheng	1	Red Card vs. Tianjin TEDA	27 Jul.	Shandong Luneng	
Qin Sheng	1	4 Yellow Cards accumulated	9 Aug.	Jiangsu Suning	
Li Jianbin	1	4 Yellow Cards accumulated	15 Aug.	Beijing Guoan	
Sun Bo	1	Red Card vs. Jiangsu Suning	15 Aug.	Beijing Guoan	
Zhu Xiaogang	1	4 Yellow Cards accumulated	21 Sep.	Shenzhen FC	
Li Jianbin	1	Red Card vs. Wuhan Zall	21 Sep.	Shenzhen FC	
Li Jianbin	1	2 Red Cards accumulated	20 Oct.	Shanghai Shenhua	
Li Jianbin	4	Kicking the ball onto opponent player with excessive force	27 Oct.–1 Dec.	–	
Yannick Carrasco	1	4 Yellow Cards accumulated	27 Oct.	Shanghai SIPG	
Cui Ming'an	1	Red Card vs. Tianjin Tianhai	1 Dec.	Beijing Renhe	
