= Sam Larsson =

Swedish footballer (born 1993)

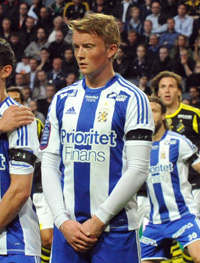
- Larsson playing for IFK Göteborg

Personal information
- Full name: Sam Andreas Larsson
- Date of birth: 10 April 1993 (age 33)
- Place of birth: Gothenburg, Sweden
- Height: 1.79 m (5 ft 10 in)
- Positions: Winger; attacking midfielder

Team information
- Current team: IFK Göteborg
- Number: 8

Youth career
- –2009: IK Zenith
- 2010–2012: IFK Göteborg

Senior career*
Years	Team	Apps	(Gls)
2012–2014	IFK Göteborg	49	(6)
2014–2017	Heerenveen	86	(23)
2017–2020	Feyenoord	72	(14)
2020–2022	Dalian Professional	21	(6)
2022–2025	Antalyaspor	94	(13)
2025–2026	Fatih Karagümrük	22	(3)
2026–	IFK Göteborg	10	(7)

International career
2012	Sweden U19	3	(0)
2013–2015	Sweden U21	10	(1)
2016–2018	Sweden	4	(1)
Medal record
Men's football
Representing Sweden
UEFA European Under-21 Championship
Winner	2015
- * Club domestic league appearances and goals as of 19:00, 19 September 2026 (UTC)

Sam Andreas Larsson (born 10 April 1993) is a Swedish professional footballer who plays as a winger for Allsvenskan club IFK Göteborg.

== Club career ==
=== IFK Göteborg ===
Born in Gothenburg, Sam Larsson made his first start in the Swedish top-flight, Allsvenskan for IFK Göteborg in March 2013, in a game against local rivals BK Häcken. By scoring once and assisting two more in a 3–0 win, Larsson quickly made his way to the headlines, with manager Mikael Stahre describing him as a "Swedish Brazilian", he furthermore earned himself the nickname "Samba-Sam", due to his impressive skills on the ball and unpredictable moves.

After a successful first season, Larsson made further progress during the following year, gaining much praise for his creative play and taking on a larger role in leading his team on the attack.

=== Heerenveen ===
==== 2014–15 season ====
On 12 August 2014, IFK Göteborg announced the transfer of Larsson to Dutch side Heerenveen. On 23 August, Larsson played his first league game for his new club, a game in which he scored once to settle a 2–0 win over SBV Excelsior. After an injury-plagued first period, Larsson started to achieve much praise for his performances, including comparisons being drawn by Heerenveen manager Dwight Lodeweges between Larsson and Argentinian star Lionel Messi. Heerenveen ended the season in 7th place in the Eredevisie, with Larsson scoring eight and assisting to four goals in 25 games.

==== 2015–16 season ====
In his second season with Heerenveen the club experienced a struggling period, finding themselves in the lower half of the table. Larsson's goal-scoring was less frequent than the previous spring, although he was recognised as the one player creating the most goal-scoring opportunities in the Eredivisie, while also being hailed by Heerenveen technical director Hans Vonk as the best dribbler in the league. Heerenveen finished the season in 12th while Larsson scored six goals and assisted another eight. At the end of the year, Larsson was awarded a place in the team of the season by Dutch newspaper De Telegraaf.

=== Feyenoord ===
On 21 August 2017, Larsson joined Feyenoord on a four-year contract. On 9 September, Larsson made his debut for Feyenoord in an away game against Heracles Almelo, in which he also scored Feyenoord's 4th goal. On 25 October, Larsson scored his first hat-trick in his career in the second round of the KNVB Cup against AVV Swift. He won the KNVB Cup with Feyenoord scoring a total of 4 goals.

On 8 August 2018, Feyenoord won the Johan Cruyff Shield against PSV Eindhoven. The game ended in 0–0, resulting in a penalty shootout that ended 5–6. Larsson missed his penalty.

=== Dalian Professional ===
On 28 February 2020, Larsson joined Dalian Professional on a three-year contract.

== International career ==
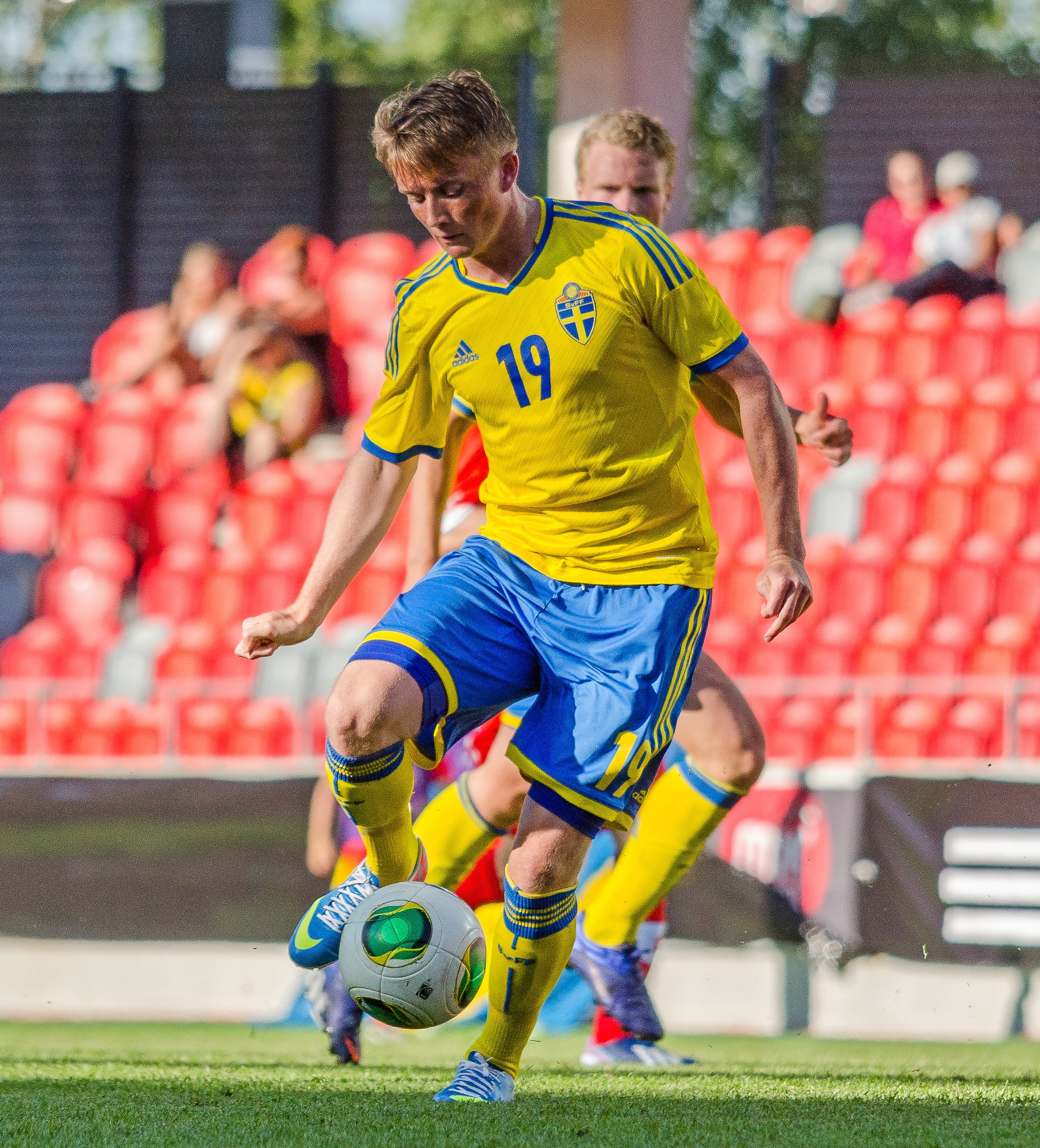
Larsson playing for Sweden U21 in 2013

Larsson got his first call up to the senior Sweden side for 2018 FIFA World Cup qualifiers against Luxembourg and Bulgaria in October 2016, however he later withdrew from the squad through injury. In the 30th minute of his debut for Sweden away against Hungary on 15 November 2016, Larsson scored from a free kick.

In 2018, Larsson was called up to the senior Sweden side again, ahead of the friendly match against Austria on 6 September 2018 and the 2018–19 UEFA Nations League match against Turkey on 10 September 2018.

== Personal life ==
He is the younger brother of former professional footballer Daniel Larsson.

== Career statistics ==
=== Club ===
As of match played 12 May 2025

Appearances and goals by club, season and competition
Club	Season	League			Cup		Continental		Other		Total	
Club	Season	Division	Apps	Goals	Apps	Goals	Apps	Goals	Apps	Goals	Apps	Goals
IFK Göteborg	2012	Allsvenskan	2	0	0	0	—		—		2	0
IFK Göteborg	2013	Allsvenskan	29	4	7	1	2	0	—		38	5
IFK Göteborg	2014	Allsvenskan	18	2	4	1	6	0	—		28	3
IFK Göteborg	Total		49	6	11	2	8	0	—		68	8
Heerenveen	2014–15	Eredivisie	21	8	0	0	—		—		21	8
Heerenveen	2015–16	Eredivisie	34	6	3	0	—		—		37	6
Heerenveen	2016–17	Eredivisie	31	9	3	0	—		—		34	9
Heerenveen	Total		86	23	6	0	—		—		92	23
Feyenoord	2017–18	Eredivisie	19	4	4	4	6	0	—		29	8
Feyenoord	2018–19	Eredivisie	32	6	4	1	2	0	—		38	7
Feyenoord	2019–20	Eredivisie	21	4	3	0	10	2	—		34	6
Feyenoord	Total		72	14	11	5	18	2	—		101	21
Dalian Professional	2020	Chinese Super League	18	4	0	0	—		—		18	4
Dalian Professional	2021	Chinese Super League	8	3	0	0	—		2 (Note: Appearance(s) in CSL Relegation play-offs)	0	10	3
Dalian Professional	Total		26	7	0	0	—		2	0	28	7
Antalyaspor	2022–23	Süper Lig	30	2	2	0	—		—		32	2
Antalyaspor	2023–24	Süper Lig	35	5	4	1	—		—		39	6
Antalyaspor	2024–25	Süper Lig	29	6	1	0	—		—		30	6
Antalyaspor	Total		94	13	7	1	—		—		101	14
Career total			327	63	35	8	26	2	2	0	390	73

=== International ===
Appearances and goals by national team and year
National team	Year	Apps	Goals
Sweden	2016	1	1
Sweden	2017	2	0
Sweden	2018	1	0
Total		4	1

Scores and results list Sweden's goal tally first.

#	Date	Venue	Opponent	Score	Result	Competition
1.	15 November 2016	Groupama Arena, Budapest, Hungary	Hungary	1–0	2–0	Friendly

== Honours ==
IFK Göteborg

- Svenska Cupen: 2012–13

Feyenoord

- KNVB Cup: 2017–18
- Johan Cruijff Shield: 2018

Sweden U21

- UEFA European Under-21 Championship: 2015
