= Zhu Jiaxuan =

Chinese association football player

Personal information
- Date of birth: 13 April 1999 (age 27)
- Place of birth: Dalian, Liaoning, China
- Height: 1.82 m (6 ft 0 in)
- Position: Midfielder

Team information
- Current team: Jiangxi Dingnan United
- Number: 6

Youth career
- Villarreal
- –2020: Dalian Pro

Senior career*
Years	Team	Apps	(Gls)
2020–2023	Dalian Pro	6	(0)
2022	→ Liaoning Shenyang Urban (loan)	13	(1)
2022	→ Heilongjiang Ice City (loan)	14	(0)
2023	→ Heilongjiang Ice City (loan)	28	(1)
2024–	Jiangxi Dingnan United	48	(2)
- * Club domestic league appearances and goals as of 1 March 2026

Zhu Jiaxuan (Chinese: 朱家漩; born 13 April 1999) is a Chinese footballer currently playing as a midfielder for Jiangxi Dingnan United.

== Club career ==
Zhu started his career with the youth team of Villarreal CF in Spain before returning to China and joining the Dalian Yifang youth system. Zhu was promoted to the Dalian Pro first team squad for the 2020 season. He made his professional debut on 3 September 2020 against Henan Jianye.

== Career statistics ==
As of 1 March 2026.

Club	Season	League			Cup		Continental		Other		Total	
Club	Season	Division	Apps	Goals	Apps	Goals	Apps	Goals	Apps	Goals	Apps	Goals
Dalian Pro	2020	Chinese Super League	1	0	1	0	–		–		2	0
Dalian Pro	2021	Chinese Super League	5	0	1	0	-		1 (Note: Appearance(s) in CSL Relegation play-offs)	0	7	0
Dalian Pro	Total		6	0	2	0	0	0	1	0	9	0
Liaoning Shenyang Urban (loan)	2022	China League One	13	1	0	0	–		–		13	1
Jiangxi Dingnan United (loan)	2022	China League One	14	0	0	0	–		–		14	0
Jiangxi Dingnan United (loan)	2023	China League One	28	1	1	0	–		–		29	1
Jiangxi Dingnan United (loan)	2024	China League One	25	1	1	0	–		–		26	1
Jiangxi Dingnan United (loan)	2025	China League One	23	1	2	1	–		–		25	2
Jiangxi Dingnan United (loan)	Total		48	2	3	1	0	0	0	0	51	3
Career total			109	4	6	1	0	0	1	0	116	5
