= Yang Zexiang =

Chinese association football player

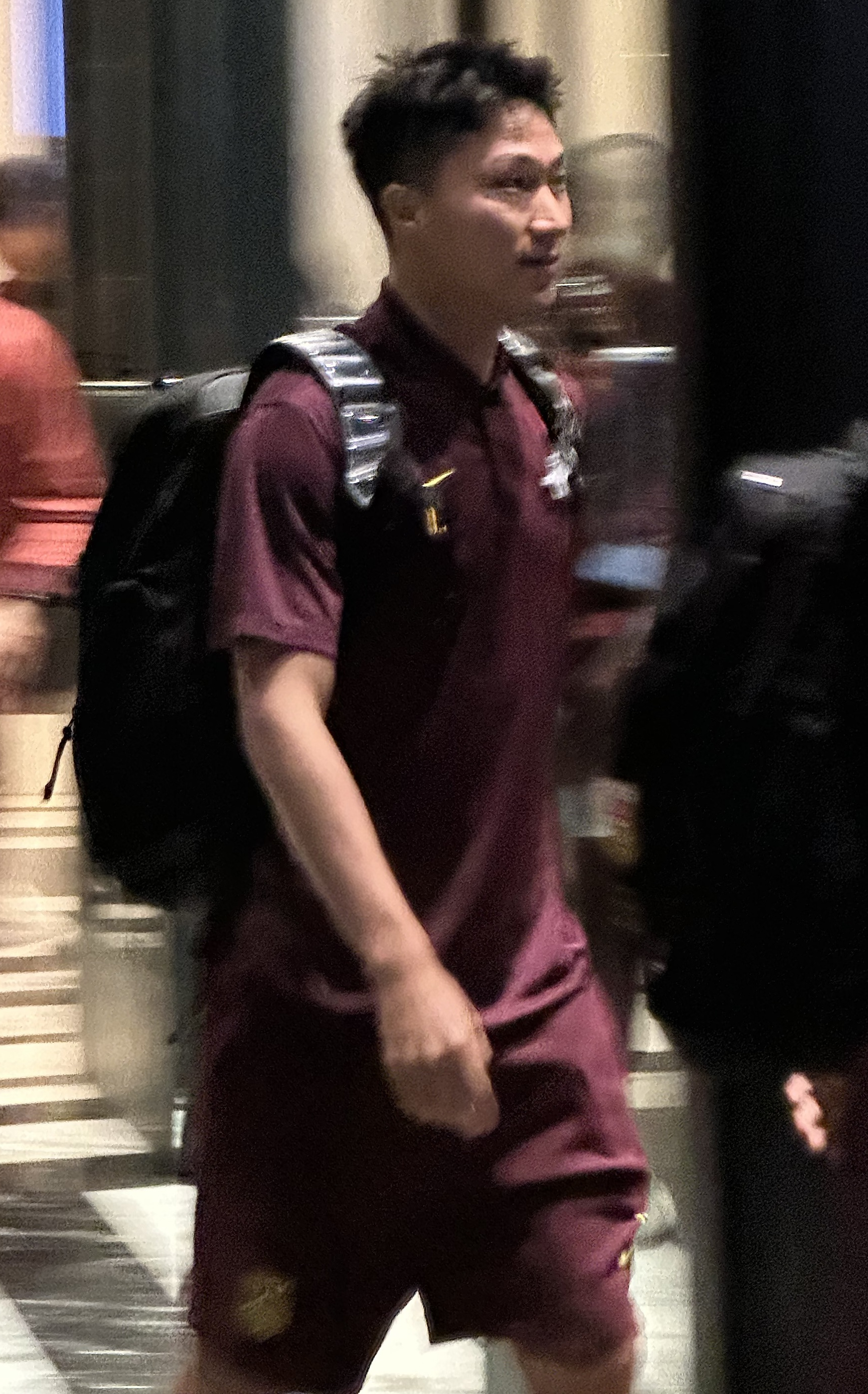
- Yang Zexiang in June 2025

Personal information
- Date of birth: 14 December 1994 (age 31)
- Place of birth: Foshan, Guangdong, China
- Height: 1.80 m (5 ft 11 in)
- Position: Right-back

Team information
- Current team: Shanghai Shenhua
- Number: 16

Youth career
- –2015: Tianjin TEDA

Senior career*
Years	Team	Apps	(Gls)
2015–2017	Tianjin TEDA	0	(0)
2017	→ Baoding Yingli ETS (loan)	29	(0)
2018	Dalian Transcendence	28	(1)
2019–2020	Dalian Pro	0	(0)
2021–	Shanghai Shenhua	83	(4)
2021	→ Chengdu Rongcheng (loan)	9	(0)

International career^{‡}
2024–	China	8	(0)
- * Club domestic league appearances and goals as of 19 November 2026 ‡ National team caps and goals as of 11 June 2024

Yang Zexiang (Chinese: 杨泽翔; born 14 December 1994) is a Chinese footballer who plays as a right-back for Shanghai Shenhua and the China national team.

== Club career ==
Yang Zexiang would play for the Tianjin TEDA youth team before being promoted to the senior team in the 2015 Chinese Super League campaign and would make his debut appearance in a Chinese FA Cup game against Xinjiang Tianshan Leopard on 8 July 2015 in a 1–0 defeat. After several seasons he was loaned out to second-tier football club Baoding Yingli ETS to gain some playing time. The following he transferred to Dalian Transcendence.

At the end of the 2018 league campaign Dalian Transcendence quit the professional league and Yang Zexiang was free to transfer to Dalian Pro. He would not make any senior appearances for Dalian Pro and joined another top-tier club in Shanghai Shenhua who loaned him out to second-tier club Chengdu Rongcheng where he gained promotion with them at the end of the 2021 China League One campaign.

On his return to Shenhua he would make his debut in league game on 5 August 2022 against Changchun Yatai, where he came on as a substitute, but was sent off for a high challenge against Zhang Li in a 0–0 draw. After his suspension he would have to wait until 23 December 2022 to be given another chance within the team, where in a league game against Cangzhou Mighty Lions he repaid the teams faith in him by scoring his first goal for the club in a 3–0 victory.

== International career ==
Yang made his debut for the China national team on 11 June 2024 in a World Cup qualifier against South Korea at the Seoul World Cup Stadium. He played the full game as South Korea won 1–0.

== Career statistics ==
As of 11 June 2024.

Club	Season	League			Cup		Continental		Other		Total	
Club	Season	Division	Apps	Goals	Apps	Goals	Apps	Goals	Apps	Goals	Apps	Goals
Tianjin TEDA	2015	Chinese Super League	0	0	1	0	–		–		1	0
Tianjin TEDA	2016	Chinese Super League	0	0	0	0	–		–		0	0
Tianjin TEDA	2017	Chinese Super League	0	0	0	0	–		–		0	0
Tianjin TEDA	Total		0	0	1	0	0	0	0	0	1	0
Baoding Yingli ETS (loan)	2017	China League One	29	0	0	0	–		–		29	0
Dalian Transcendence	2018	China League One	28	1	0	0	–		–		28	1
Dalian Pro	2019	Chinese Super League	0	0	0	0	–		–		0	0
Dalian Pro	2020	Chinese Super League	0	0	0	0	–		–		0	0
Dalian Pro	Total		0	0	0	0	0	0	0	0	0	0
Shanghai Shenhua	2021	Chinese Super League	0	0	0	0	–		–		0	0
Shanghai Shenhua	2022	Chinese Super League	4	1	2	1	–		–		6	2
Shanghai Shenhua	2023	Chinese Super League	15	0	5	0	–		–		20	0
Shanghai Shenhua	2024	Chinese Super League	13	0	0	0	0	0	1 (Note: Appearances in Chinese FA Super Cup)	0	14	0
Shanghai Shenhua	Total		32	1	7	1	0	0	1	0	40	2
Chengdu Rongcheng (loan)	2021	China League One	9	0	0	0	–		0 (Note: Appearance(s) in Promotion/Relegation Play-offs)	0	9	0
Career total			98	2	8	1	0	0	1	0	107	3

== Honours ==
Shanghai Shenhua

- Chinese FA Cup: 2023
- Chinese FA Super Cup: 2024, 2025
