= Wang Zhen'ao =

Chinese association football player

Personal information
- Date of birth: 10 August 1999 (age 27)
- Place of birth: Wuhan, Hubei, China
- Height: 1.70 m (5 ft 7 in)
- Positions: Winger; full-back; forward

Team information
- Current team: Shanghai Port
- Number: 19

Youth career
- 2012–2017: Beijing Wanda
- 2012: → Atlético Madrid (loan)
- 2018: Vejle Boldklub

Senior career*
Years	Team	Apps	(Gls)
2018–2020	Vejle Boldklub	2	(0)
2020–2023	Dalian Pro	37	(0)
2024–	Shanghai Port	30	(0)

International career^{‡}
2023	China U23	5	(1)
2024–	China	1	(0)
- * Club domestic league appearances and goals as of 19 November 2026 ‡ National team caps and goals as of 14:36, 6 June 2024 (UTC)

Wang Zhen'ao (Chinese: 王振澳; pinyin: Wáng Zhèn'ào; born 10 August 1999) is a Chinese professional footballer who plays as a defender for Shanghai Port and the China national team.

== Club career ==
=== Early career ===
Wang joined Beijing Wanda and was loaned to Wanda Group's related club Atlético Madrid for youth training in 2012. He refused to sign a professional contract with Wanda in the summer of 2017.

=== Vejle Boldklub ===
Wang would instead join Danish 1st Division side Vejle Boldklub on 5 January 2018. Wang would be promoted to their senior team and was part of the squad that won and gained promotion at the end of the 2017–18 Danish 1st Division season. He would make his professional debut the following season in a league game on 23 November 2018 against AaB Fodbold in a 1–1 draw.

=== Dalian Pro ===
On 26 February 2020, Wang reached agreement with Wanda Group and resolved his previous contract dispute with them to join Wanda owned Dalian Pro in the 2020 Chinese Super League. He would go on to make his debut in a Chinese FA Cup game on 18 September 2020 against Shandong Luneng Taishan in a 4–0 defeat. His league debut would soon follow on 27 September 2020 against Guangzhou Evergrande Taobao in a 1–0 defeat.

=== Shanghai Port ===
On 18 February 2024, Wang signed a contract with Chinese giants Shanghai Port on a two-year contract.

== International career ==
Wang made his debut for the China national team on 6 June 2024 in a 2026 FIFA World Cup qualifier against Thailand. He played the full game as it ended in a 1–1 draw.

== Career statistics ==
As of 1 March 2026.

Club	Season	League			Cup		Continental		Other		Total	
Club	Season	Division	Apps	Goals	Apps	Goals	Apps	Goals	Apps	Goals	Apps	Goals
Vejle Boldklub	2017–18	Danish 1st Division	0	0	0	0	–		–		0	0
Vejle Boldklub	2018–19	Danish Superliga	2	0	3	0	–		–		5	0
Vejle Boldklub	2019–20	Danish 1st Division	0	0	0	0	–		–		0	0
Vejle Boldklub	Total		2	0	3	0	0	0	0	0	5	0
Dalian Pro	2020	Chinese Super League	1	0	1	0	–		–		2	0
Dalian Pro	2021	Chinese Super League	11	0	2	0	-		0 (Note: Appearance(s) Promotion/Relegation Play-offs)	0	13	0
Dalian Pro	2022	Chinese Super League	3	0	0	0	-		–		3	0
Dalian Pro	2023	Chinese Super League	22	0	1	0	-		–		23	0
Dalian Pro	Total		37	0	4	0	0	0	0	0	41	0
Shanghai Port	2024	Chinese Super League	13	0	2	1	6	0	1 (Note: Appearances in Chinese FA Super Cup)	0	12	0
Shanghai Port	2025	Chinese Super League	4	0	0	0	0	0	1	0	5	0
Shanghai Port	Total		17	0	2	1	6	0	2	0	27	1
Career total			56	0	9	1	6	0	2	0	73	1

== Honours ==
=== Club ===
Shanghai Port

- Chinese Super League: 2024, 2025
- Chinese FA Cup: 2024
