= Yannick Carrasco =

Belgian footballer (born 1993)

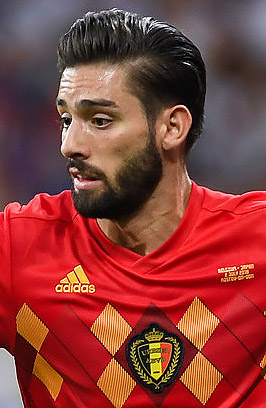
- Carrasco playing for Belgium at the 2018 FIFA World Cup

Personal information
- Full name: Yannick Ferreira Carrasco
- Date of birth: 4 September 1993 (age 33)
- Place of birth: Vilvoorde, Belgium
- Height: 1.81 m (5 ft 11 in)
- Position: Left midfielder

Team information
- Current team: Al-Shabab
- Number: 10

Youth career
- 1999–2001: Stade Everois
- 2001–2005: Diegem Sport
- 2005–2010: Genk

Senior career*
Years	Team	Apps	(Gls)
2010–2012	Monaco B	30	(8)
2012–2015	Monaco	81	(15)
2015–2018	Atlético Madrid	81	(17)
2018–2020	Dalian Yifang	50	(24)
2020	→ Atlético Madrid (loan)	15	(1)
2020–2023	Atlético Madrid	102	(19)
2023–	Al-Shabab	78	(32)

International career
2008	Belgium U15	1	(0)
2010	Belgium U17	2	(0)
2010–2011	Belgium U18	9	(1)
2011–2012	Belgium U19	12	(3)
2013–2014	Belgium U21	11	(1)
2015–2024	Belgium	78	(11)
Medal record
Men's football
Representing Belgium
FIFA World Cup
Third place	2018 Russia
- * Club domestic league appearances and goals as of 30 October 2026 (UTC)

Yannick Ferreira Carrasco (born 4 September 1993) is a Belgian professional footballer who plays as a left midfielder for and captains Saudi Pro League club Al-Shabab.

Carrasco began his career with Monaco, where he scored 20 goals in 105 professional games, winning Ligue 2 in his first season and finishing runner-up in Ligue 1 in the second. In 2015, he joined La Liga side Atlético Madrid for a reported €20 million, scoring the equaliser as Atlético lost the 2016 UEFA Champions League final. After a two-year spell with Dalian Professional in the Chinese Super League, Carrasco returned to Atlético in 2020, winning a La Liga title, before departing again for Al-Shabab in 2023.

Carrasco made his international debut for Belgium in April 2015. He played at the UEFA European Championship in 2016, 2020 and 2024, and was part of their squad that came third at the 2018 FIFA World Cup.

== Early and personal life ==
Carrasco was born in Vilvoorde, Belgium, to a Portuguese father and a Spanish mother. His father left the family when Yannick was still a child, leaving his mother, Carmen, to raise him and his brother Mylan. He has two younger half-siblings, Hugo and Celia. While initially known as "Ferreira Carrasco" at the time of his professional debut, he later chose to drop the paternal part of his Spanish-style double surname. Both his maternal grandparents are from the region of Andalusia; his maternal grandmother being from Seville, while his maternal grandfather being from Córdoba.

In 2017, Carrasco married former Miss Belgium Noémie Happart.

== Club career ==
=== Monaco ===
Carrasco joined Monaco from Belgian club Genk in 2010. He made his professional debut on 30 July 2012 in the opening game of the Ligue 2 season against Tours, opening a 4–0 victory on the stage at the Stade Louis II via a free kick. On 13 April 2013, he scored both goals of a 2–0 league victory over Auxerre. In his debut campaign with the club, he appeared in 27 games and scored six goals as Monaco won promotion back to Ligue 1.

His first top-flight goal came on 5 October 2013 against Saint-Étienne, converting a James Rodríguez cross and helping Monaco to a 2–1 victory. He scored twice in the opening 10 minutes fifteen days later as Monaco drew 2–2 away to Sochaux; the team finished their first season back at the top as runners up to Paris Saint-Germain.

On 25 February 2015, he scored the last goal of Monaco's 3–1 away win at Arsenal in the last 16 first leg of the 2014–15 UEFA Champions League, after replacing Dimitar Berbatov in the 75th minute.

=== Atlético Madrid ===
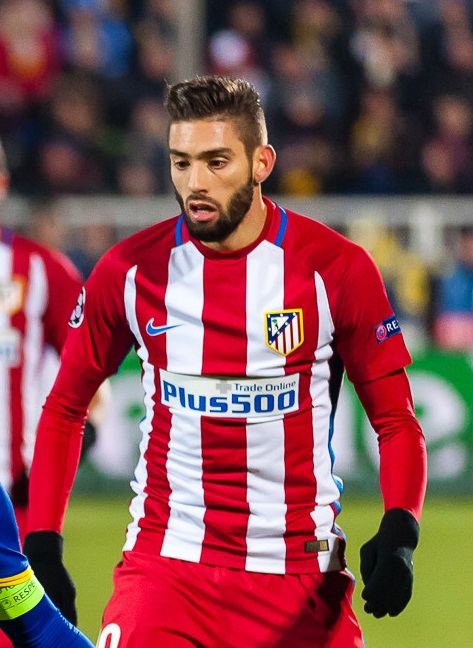
Carrasco in 2016

On 10 July 2015, Atlético Madrid announced the signing of Carrasco on a five-year deal for a reported fee of €20 million. On 18 October, he scored his first goal for Atletico in a 2–0 away victory over Real Sociedad.

On 28 May 2016, as a half-time replacement for Augusto Fernández in the 2016 UEFA Champions League Final at the San Siro, Carrasco scored Atlético's 79th-minute equaliser against Real Madrid; his team lost in a penalty shoot-out. He was the first Belgian to score in a European Cup final.

On 15 October 2016, he scored his first professional hat-trick in a 7–1 rout of Granada.

=== Dalian Yifang ===
On 26 February 2018, along with teammate Nicolás Gaitán, Carrasco moved to Chinese Super League newcomers Dalian Yifang (later rebranded as Dalian Professional), a club owned by Atléti's partial owner Dalian Wanda Group. He made his debut on 3 March in an 8–0 loss to Shanghai SIPG, and scored his first goal in his fourth match for the club on 31 March, in a 1–1 away draw with Henan Jianye, ending his club's season-opening three-game losing streak.

=== Return to Atlético Madrid ===
On 31 January 2020, Carrasco returned to Atlético Madrid on loan until the end of the season. On 8 September 2020, he rejoined the club on a permanent basis, signing a four-year contract. On 21 November 2020, he scored the only goal in a 1–0 victory over Barcelona.

=== Al-Shabab ===
On 4 September 2023, Carrasco signed a three-year contract with Saudi Pro League club Al-Shabab for a reported fee of €15 million. In the 2025–26 season, he scored 18 goals and provided ten assists, recording his best-ever league campaign in terms of goal contributions. On 1 June 2026, he extended his contract with the club until 2027.

== International career ==
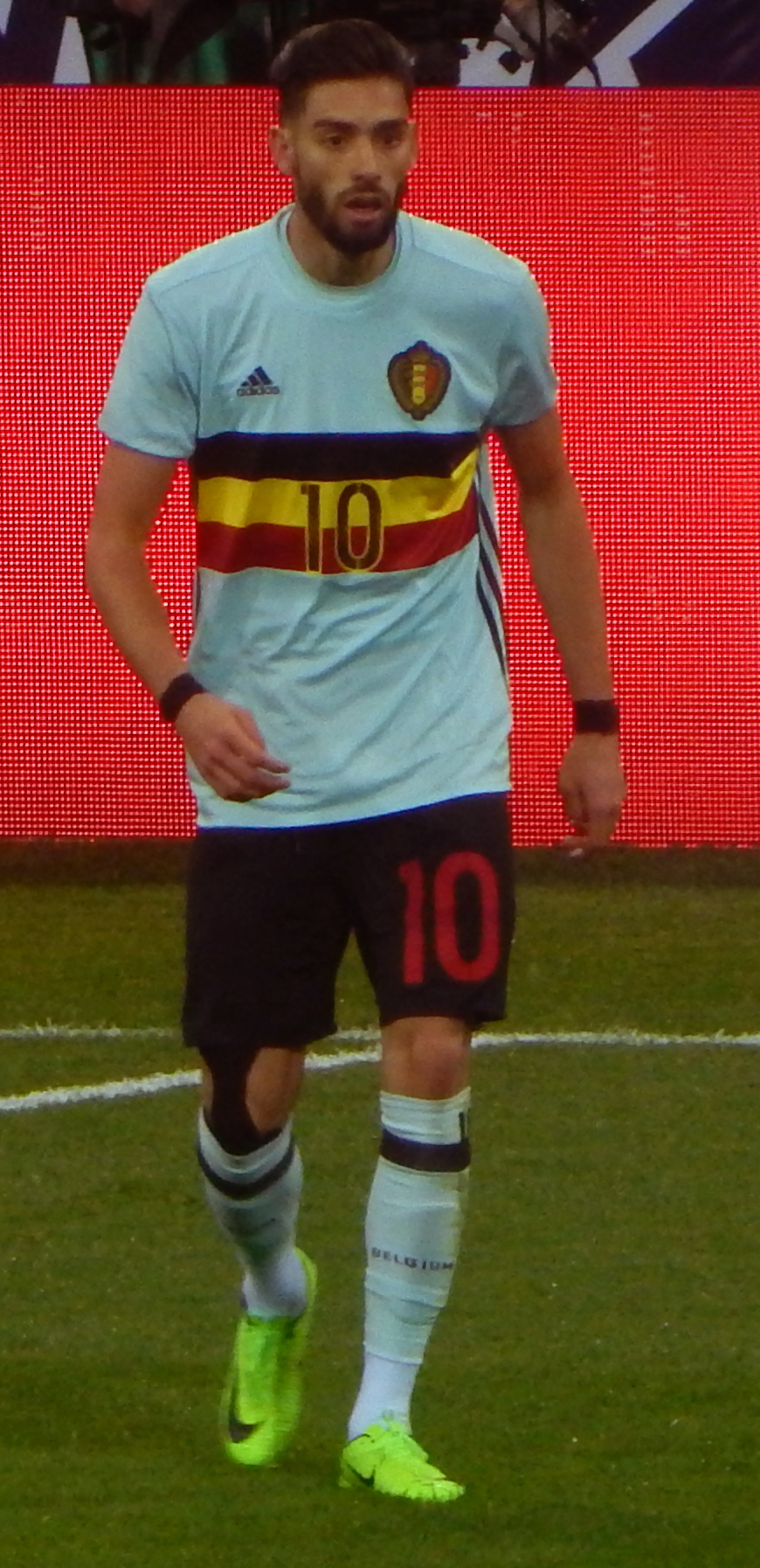
Exhibition match against Russia in Sochi (2017)

Carrasco made his senior international debut in March 2015, as a 69th-minute substitute for Marouane Fellaini in a 5–0 win over Cyprus in UEFA Euro 2016 qualification. He was named in manager Marc Wilmots' squad for the final tournament. On 26 June, in the last 16 in Toulouse, he scored his first international goal to conclude a 4–0 win over Hungary, after replacing Dries Mertens in the second half.

Carrasco was included in the Belgian squad for the 2018 FIFA World Cup by manager Roberto Martínez. He made his debut in the opening group stage victory over Panama and was deployed as an attacking left wing back in a 3–4–3 formation.

== Career statistics ==
=== Club ===
As of match played 30 October 2026

Appearances and goals by club, season and competition
Club	Season	League			National cup (Note: Includes Coupe de France, Copa del Rey, Chinese FA Cup, King's Cup)		League cup (Note: Includes Coupe de la Ligue)		Continental		Other		Total	
Club	Season	Division	Apps	Goals	Apps	Goals	Apps	Goals	Apps	Goals	Apps	Goals	Apps	Goals
Monaco II	2010–11	CFA	6	0	—		—		—		—		6	0
Monaco II	2011–12	CFA	21	7	—		—		—		—		21	7
Monaco II	2012–13	CFA	1	0	—		—		—		—		1	0
Monaco II	2013–14	CFA	2	1	—		—		—		—		2	1
Monaco II	Total		30	8	—		—		—		—		30	8
Monaco	2012–13	Ligue 2	27	6	2	0	2	2	—		—		31	8
Monaco	2013–14	Ligue 1	18	3	4	1	0	0	—		—		22	4
Monaco	2014–15	Ligue 1	36	6	4	0	2	1	10 (Note: Appearance(s) in UEFA Champions League)	1	—		52	8
Monaco	Total		81	15	10	1	4	3	10	1	—		105	20
Atlético Madrid	2015–16	La Liga	29	4	5	0	—		9	1	—		43	5
Atlético Madrid	2016–17	La Liga	35	10	6	2	—		12	2	—		53	14
Atlético Madrid	2017–18	La Liga	17	3	5	1	—		6 (Note: Five appearances in UEFA Champions League, one appearance in UEFA Europa League)	0	—		28	4
Atlético Madrid	Total		81	17	16	3	—		27	3	—		124	23
Dalian Yifang	2018	Chinese Super League	25	7	1	0	—		—		—		26	7
Dalian Yifang	2019	Chinese Super League	25	17	1	0	—		—		—		26	17
Dalian Yifang	Total		50	24	2	0	—		—		—		52	24
Atlético Madrid (loan)	2019–20	La Liga	15	1	0	0	—		1	0	0	0	16	1
Atlético Madrid	2020–21	La Liga	30	6	0	0	—		5	1	—		35	7
Atlético Madrid	2021–22	La Liga	34	6	2	0	—		7	0	1 (Note: Appearance(s) in Supercopa de España)	0	44	6
Atlético Madrid	2022–23	La Liga	35	7	3	2	—		6	1	—		44	10
Atlético Madrid	2023–24	La Liga	3	0	—		—		—		—		3	0
Atlético Madrid	Total		117	20	5	2	—		19	2	1	0	142	24
Al-Shabab	2023–24	Saudi Pro League	24	7	3	4	—		—		—		27	11
Al-Shabab	2024–25	Saudi Pro League	16	2	2	0	—		—		—		18	2
Al-Shabab	2025–26	Saudi Pro League	29	18	3	2	—		—		7 (Note: Appearances in AGCFF Gulf Club Champions League)	5	39	25
Al-Shabab	2026–27	Saudi Pro League	9	5	1	1	—		—		—		10	6
Al-Shabab	Total		78	32	9	7	—		—		7	5	94	44
Career total			437	116	42	13	4	3	56	6	8	5	547	143

=== International ===
As of match played 1 July 2024

Appearances and goals by national team and year
National team	Year	Apps	Goals
Belgium	2015	4	0
Belgium	2016	11	4
Belgium	2017	7	1
Belgium	2018	12	0
Belgium	2019	7	1
Belgium	2020	3	0
Belgium	2021	10	2
Belgium	2022	8	0
Belgium	2023	10	3
Belgium	2024	6	0
Total		78	11

Scores and results list Belgium's goal tally first, score column indicates score after each Carrasco goal.

List of international goals scored by Yannick Carrasco
No.	Date	Venue	Cap	Opponent	Score	Result	Competition
1	26 June 2016	Stadium Municipal, Toulouse, France	8	Hungary	4–0	4–0	UEFA Euro 2016
2	6 September 2016	GSP Stadium, Nicosia, Cyprus	11	Cyprus	3–0	3–0	2018 FIFA World Cup qualification
3	9 November 2016	Amsterdam Arena, Amsterdam, Netherlands	14	Netherlands	1–1	1–1	Friendly
4	14 November 2016	King Baudouin Stadium, Brussels, Belgium	15	Estonia	4–1	8–1	2018 FIFA World Cup qualification
5	7 October 2017	Stadion Grbavica, Sarajevo, Bosnia and Herzegovina	22	Bosnia and Herzegovina	4–3	4–3	2018 FIFA World Cup qualification
6	19 November 2019	King Baudouin Stadium, Brussels, Belgium	41	Cyprus	4–1	6–1	UEFA Euro 2020 qualifying
7	7 October 2021	Juventus Stadium, Turin, Italy	52	France	1–0	2–3	2021 UEFA Nations League Finals
8	13 November 2021	King Baudouin Stadium, Brussels, Belgium	54	Estonia	2–0	3–1	2022 FIFA World Cup qualification
9	28 March 2023	RheinEnergieStadion, Cologne, Germany	64	Germany	1–0	3–2	Friendly
10	9 September 2023	Dalga Arena, Baku, Azerbaijan	67	Azerbaijan	1–0	1–0	UEFA Euro 2024 qualifying
11	15 November 2023	Den Dreef, Leuven, Belgium	71	Serbia	1–0	1–0	Friendly

== Honours ==
Monaco

- Ligue 2: 2012–13

Atlético Madrid

- La Liga: 2020–21
- UEFA Champions League runner-up: 2015–16

Al-Shabab

- AGCFF Gulf Club Champions League runner-up: 2025–26

Belgium

- FIFA World Cup third place: 2018

Individual

- Saudi Pro League Player of the Month: April 2024
