= Yang Fangzhi =

Chinese footballer

Yang Fangzhi 杨芳志
Personal information
- Date of birth: 9 April 1997 (age 29)
- Place of birth: Wuhan, Hubei, China
- Height: 1.82 m (5 ft 11 1/2 in)
- Position: Midfielder

Team information
- Current team: Zhejiang Yiteng
- Number: 15

Youth career
- Dalian Yiteng
- 2012–2017: Dalian Yifang

Senior career*
Years	Team	Apps	(Gls)
2017	→ Dalian Transcendence (loan)	7	(0)
2018–2019	Dalian Yifang	12	(0)
2020	Zhejiang Yiteng	3	(0)
2021	Hunan X-ray	4	(0)
- * Club domestic league appearances and goals as of 31 December 2020

Yang Fangzhi (Chinese: 杨芳志; pinyin: Yáng Fāngzhì; born 9 April 1997) is a Chinese footballer who currently plays for Chinese Champions League side Hunan X-ray.

== Club career ==
Yang Fangzhi was loaned to China League One side Dalian Transcendence from Dalian Yifang in June 2017. On 1 July 2017, Yang made his senior debut in a 3–3 home draw against Shenzhen as the benefit of the new rule of the League One that at least one Under-23 player must in the starting and was substituted off in the 6th minute when Dalian was leading 1–0. He played seven league matches in the 2017 season.

Yang was promoted to Dalian Yifang's first team squad in 2018 after the club won promotion to the Chinese Super League. He made his debut on 16 March 2018 in a 3–0 home defeat against Beijing Sinobo Guoan, coming on as a substitute for injury Nicolás Gaitán in the 62nd minute.

In the 2019 season, Yang gained a few chances before July, but was removed from the first team squad after Benítez's arrival.

On 23 July 2020, Yang transferred to Zhejiang Yiteng.

== Career statistics ==
As of 31 December 2020.

Appearances and goals by club, season and competition
Club	Season	League			National Cup		Continental		Other		Total	
Club	Season	Division	Apps	Goals	Apps	Goals	Apps	Goals	Apps	Goals	Apps	Goals
Dalian Transcendence (loan)	2017	China League One	7	0	0	0	-		-		7	0
Dalian Yifang	2018	Chinese Super League	4	0	1	0	-		-		5	0
Dalian Yifang	2019	Chinese Super League	8	0	1	0	-		-		9	0
Dalian Yifang	Total		12	0	2	0	0	0	0	0	14	0
Zhejiang Yiteng	2020	China League Two	3	0	-		-		-		3	0
Career total			22	0	2	0	0	0	0	0	24	0
