= Liu Yujian (footballer) =

Chinese footballer (born 1979)

Personal information
- Date of birth: 31 January 1979 (age 47)
- Place of birth: Dalian, Liaoning, China
- Position: Defender

Team information
- Current team: Dalian Yingbo (assistant coach)

Youth career
- Dalian Wanda

Senior career*
Years	Team	Apps	(Gls)
1997–2001	Dalian Wanda		
2002	Dalian Sidelong		
2003–2005	Sichuan First City		
2006	Changchun Yatai		
2008–2009	Dalian Shide		
2010–2011	Dalian Aerbin		

International career
1998	China U20		

Managerial career
- 2010–2012: Dalian Aerbin (assistant)
- 2013–2021: Dalian Aerbin Youth
- 2019: China U17 (assistant)
- 2022: Dalian Jinshiwan
- 2023: Wuxi Wugou (assistant)
- 2023–2024: Shanghai Jiading Huilong (assistant)
- 2025–: Dalian Yingbo (assistant)
- * Club domestic league appearances and goals

Liu Yujian (simplified Chinese: 刘玉建; traditional Chinese: 劉玉建; pinyin: Liú Yùjiàn; born 31 January 1979) is a Chinese former footballer, currently serving as an assistant coach at Dalian Yingbo.

== Club career ==
Liu was promoted to the first-team squad of Dalian Wanda in 1997. He represented China U20 in the 1998 AFC Youth Championship. His position was replaced since Adilson's arrival, and sought for transfer in 2002.

In 2002, he moved to Dalian Sidelong. A year later, he followed his manager Xu Hong and moved to Sichuan First City. In 2004, during a match against Beijing Guoan, Sui Dongliang's tackle caused serious fracture on his right leg. As a result, he was unable to play for an entire year.

In 2006, he joined Changchun Yatai, before returning to Dalian Shide in 2008.

In 2010, he joined the newly-established Dalian Aerbin. Since 2012, he has been working as manager after his retirement at Dalian Aerbin. He managed Dalian Yifang U19 team since 2019, and gradually promoted to the U21 team. In 2022, Dalian Pro U21 team would compete as an independent club named Dalian Jinshiwan, and Liu remained the manager of the team.
