= 2022 Dalian Professional F.C. season =

Dalian Professional Football Club season

Dalian Pro
- Chairman: Gui Bing
- Manager: Xie Hui
- Stadium: Puwan Stadium
- Chinese Super League: 11th
- FA Cup: 2rd round
- Top goalscorer: Lin Liangming (12 goals)
Home colours	Away colours

The 2022 Dalian Professional F.C. season was the 13th season in club history.

== Overview ==
=== Preseason ===
On 16 February, the team regrouped for winter training. Sun Wei, Zhou Ting and Liu Yujian served as temporary managers.

On 12 March, Dalian Pro announced major changes in its owners. Wanda Group decided to quit, and the team would be taken over temporarily by a government-led reforming work team. Past debts and operating costs of the first team, youth training facilities and projects for the next three years would still be covered by Wanda Group through a sponsor contract. The Dalian Pro Academy Base was donated to DETA Holdings (Chinese:德泰控股), a state-invested company in Dalian. After the announcement, Dalian Pro publicly recruited for head coaches and professional players.

On 19 March, Xie Hui was announced the team's new manager.

As Wanda quit the club's operation, Dalian Pro further tightened their expenses by cutting players' salaries. Due to this issue, Zhao Xuri, Zheng Long and Tao Qianglong left the team on free transfer, while Li Shuai and Sun Bo terminated their contracts through CFA arbitrations. On the other hand, Dalian Pro signed multiple free, experienced players for replenishment, many of which were born in Dalian. Until 5 May when player registration was submitted, Larsson, Danielson and Boateng were not in squad, indicating that domestic players would be the only choice of Dalian for the first few rounds of the 2022 season.

In May, it was reported that Dalian Pro U-21 team would compete separately as Dalian Jinshiwan F.C. The team was able to participate in the 2022 Chinese Champions League through qualification rounds. Liu Yujian remained as the head coach, while Zhou Ting was registered as both player and coach of the team.

On 24 May, Chongqing Liangjiang Athletic announced their end of operation. On 26 May, it was reported that Dalian Pro's back into the 2022 Chinese Super League was approved. Dalian Pro would replace Chongqing, to play in Haikou, Hainan.

=== June ===
Though being considered the team with the most relegation possibility for lack of foreign players and CLO-level transfers, Dalian Pro gained much appreciation through their first few matches for Xie Hui's aggressive formation and pressing tactics. The team were able to suppress teams with 4 foreign players with fully-domestic startup, which was considered almost impossible in the past few seasons. Newly joined elder players like Yan Xianghcuang, Fei Yu and Shang Yin had above-expectation performances. However, a mistake in player substitution occurred during the match against Guangzhou City, leading to a 47-second match time without U-23 players for Dalian Pro, which flawed the almost-perfect league start. The opponent submitted complaint case to the CFA after the match. While Dalian Pro claimed that Shan Huanhuan's injury during the U-23 national team callup allowed them to neglect the U-23 rule, their 2–0 victory was finally re-judged to a 0–3 defeat.

=== July-Interval 1 ===
For the first time since 2020, the second stage of the 2022 CSL would return to its normal Home-Away fixtures, instead of closed-door matches held in a selected city. Dalian Pro temporarily relocated their home stadium to Puwan Stadium (普湾体育场), a newly built stadium, while Shanghai Port and Shanghai Shenhua would use Dalian Sports Center and Jinzhou Stadium as their temporary home stadium due to special pandemic regulations in Shanghai.

Two foreign players trained with the team during the interval, Borislav Tsonev and Streli Mamba.

=== August ===
On 18 August, Dalian Pro announced the withdrawn of their transfer ban. On 21 August, 2 foreign players and 4 domestic players joined the team. Also, Dalian Pro extended the contract with Xie Hui for 3 years. By the end of mid-season transfer window, the team signed two more foreign players Manzoki and Bosančić to strengthen the squad.

Dalian Jinshiwan ranked 1st in the 2022 CMCL group K, and further qualified into the CMCL finals. Li Jiahao scored 6 goals to won the best goal scorer in group k.

=== September ===
Tsonev scored his debut goal against Mezhou Hakka. He had goals in all of his first 4 matches.

On 1 September, the team won Shenzhen by 5–1, to become the largest win in team history, comparing to the 5–2 victory against Shandong Luneng in 2012 (round 18).

According to the team, Manzoki and Bosancic arrived in China on 30 August and 4 September, respectively.

Due to regional COVID restrictions in Dalian, rounds 16 through 20 were postponed.

Since the middle of September, a few players of the same agent including Lin Liangming, Tong Lei, Wu Wei, and Shan Huanhuan, were reported to have contract disputes with the club. They were removed from the starting lineups. As reported, the team would like to further reduce salaries with these players, which was the major cause of this dispute. By the end of the month, Lin Liangming, ranking as the team's top goal scorer at the time, reached consensus with the team, but the other three players were still absent from the squad.

The team had some difficulties switching to new formations with new players. Bosancic had partial Achilles tendon rupture in his second match, and would be absent for quite a few months.

=== October ===
Round 23 to 25 were postponed due to multiple concerns regarding the 20th National Congress of the CCP.

In the October 31 match against Wuhan Yangtze River, Dalian Pro were awarded the first penalty kick in this season.

As of the end of October, the team acquired 25 points, and constantly maintained a pleasant 10-point gap above the relegation zone.

=== November ===
After acquiring a winning from Hebei, Dalian Pro maintained a 21-point gap above the relegation zone (36 points vs 15 points at the time). With 6 matches to play, Dalian Pro were safe from relegation. After the key victory, it was reported that Mamba and Manzoki returned home.

=== December ===
As for the 9 Dec victory from Shanghai Shenhua, Dalian Pro remained undefeated for 7 matches, and had a 4-match winning streak, which the team had never experienced in the Chinese Super League. Previously in the 2012 season, Dalian was undefeated for 6 matches, while the longest super league winning streak was 3 matches (2012, 2013, 2018, 2019).

Dalian Pro reported physical issues of multiple players, and promoted 7 players from U-19 team temporarily before the match against Wuhan Yangtze River.

The CFA declared Tianjin JM Tiger to lose for the Dec. 27 match, as Tianjin were unable to play due to COVID infections.

== Squad ==
=== First team squad ===
As of 30 August 2022

No.	Name	Nat.	Place of Birth	Date of Birth (Age)	Joined	From	Note
Goalkeepers
1	Zhang Chong^{c}	(China)	(China) Dalian	25 November 1987 (aged 34)	2013	Dalian Shide	
30	Wu Yan	(China)	(China) Yangzhou	7 January 1989 (aged 33)	Mid 2022	Shaanxi Chang'an Athletic	
32	Kudirat Ablet	(China)	(China) Yining	5 February 1997 (aged 25)	2021	(Portugal) Gondomar	
Defenders
2	Lin Longchang	(China)	(China) Dalian	24 February 1990 (aged 32)	2022	Guizhou	
3	Shan Pengfei	(China)	(China) Dalian	7 May 1993 (aged 28)	2012	Dalian Yifang youth	
6	Wang Xianjun	(China)	(China) Dalian	1 June 2000 (aged 21)	2020	Dalian Pro youth	
8	Zhu Ting ^{4c}	(China)	(China) Dalian	15 July 1985 (aged 36)	2022	Qingdao	
11	Sun Guowen	(China)	(China) Dalian	30 September 1993 (aged 28)	2013	Dalian Shide	
13	Wang Yaopeng	(China)	(China) Dalian	18 January 1995 (aged 27)	2014	Liaoning youth	
14	Huang Jiahui	(China)	(China) Bozhou	7 October 2000 (aged 21)	2019	Dalian Yifang youth	
16	Tong Lei	(China)	(China) Quzhou	16 December 1997 (aged 24)	2020	Zhejiang Greentown	
18	He Yupeng	(China)	(China) Anshan	5 December 1999 (aged 22)	2019	Dalian Yifang youth	
22	Dong Yanfeng	(China)	(China) Dalian	11 February 1996 (aged 26)	2016	Liaoning youth	
24	Liu Le	(China)	(China) Beijing	14 February 1989 (aged 33)	Mid 2022	Dalian Huayi	
44	Vas Nuñez	(Hong Kong)	(Hong Kong) Hongkong	22 November 1995 (aged 26)	Mid 2022	Meizhou Hakka	
Midfielders
5	Wu Wei	(China)	(China) Xinxiang	5 February 1997 (aged 25)	2020	Tianjin Tianhai	
7	Lin Liangming	(China)	(China) Shantou	4 June 1997 (aged 24)	2020	(Portugal) Gondomar	
10	Borislav Tsonev	(Bulgaria)	Blagoevgrad	29 April 1995 (aged 27)	Mid 2022	(Ukraine) Chornomorets Odesa	
19	Wang Zhen'ao	(China)	(China) Wuhan	10 August 1999 (aged 22)	2020	Dalian Pro youth	
20	Wang Tengda	(China)	(China) Dalian	18 February 2001 (aged 21)	2020	Dalian Pro youth	
21	Gui Zihan	(China)	(China) Dalian	8 May 2003 (aged 18)	Mid 2022	Tianjin Jinmen Tiger	
26	Cui Ming'an	(China)	(China) Dalian	15 November 1994 (aged 27)	2014	Dalian Yifang youth	
28	Fei Yu	(China)	(China) Shanghai	6 February 1991 (aged 31)	2022	Nantong Zhiyun	
31	Lü Peng3c	(China)	(China) Dalian	28 October 1989 (aged 32)	2022	Qingdao	
33	Song Zhiwei	(China)	(China) Dalian	19 March 1989 (aged 33)	2022	Wuhan Yangtze River	
35	Wang Yu	(China)	(China) Dalian	28 April 2002 (aged 20)	2021	Dalian Pro youth	
37	Ning Hao	(China)	(China) Qingdao	12 March 1985 (aged 37)	2022	Liaoning Shenyang Urban	
38	Lü Zhuoyi	(China)	(China) Guangzhou	16 April 2001 (aged 21)	2022	Dalian Pro youth	
40	Nemanja Bosančić	(Serbia)	(Serbia and Montenegro) Pristina	1 March 1995 (aged 27)	Mid 2022	(Finland) FC Lahti	
Forwards
9	Shan Huanhuan	(China)	(China) Pingdingshan	24 January 1999 (aged 23)	2019	(Portugal) Vitória Guimarães B	
17	Streli Mamba	(Germany)	Göppingen	17 June 1994 (aged 27)	Mid 2022	(Uzbekistan) FC Kairat	
23	Shang Yin	(China)	(China) Shanghai	23 January 1989 (aged 33)	2022	Jiangxi Beidamen	
25	Feng Zeyuan	(China)	(China) Guilin	19 November 2001 (aged 20)	2022	Dalian Pro youth	
39	Yan Xiangchuang^{vc}	(China)	(China) Dalian	5 September 1986 (aged 35)	2022	Beijing BSU	
45	Lobi Manzoki	(Central African Republic)	(Democratic Republic of the Congo) Bunia	12 October 1996 (aged 25)	Mid 2022	(Uganda) Vipers SC	
Left or un-registered during the season
12	Zhang Jiansheng	(China)	(China) Xingtai	30 December 1999 (aged 22)	2020	Dalian Pro youth	Loaned out
15	Zhao Jianbo	(China)	(China) Dalian	7 May 2001 (aged 20)	2020	Dalian Pro youth	China U–21
36	Wang Jinshuai	(China)	(China) Dalian	9 January 2001 (aged 21)	2021	Dalian Pro youth	China U–21
Temporarily joined since 23 December
46	Xiao Zhiren	(China)	(China) Guangzhou	19 January 2003 (aged 19)	2022	Dalian Pro youth	
47	Zhao Jia'nan	(China)	(China) Zhengzhou	11 August 2004 (aged 17)	2022	Dalian Pro youth	
48	Elkut Eysajan	(China)	(China) Ili	29 July 2004 (aged 17)	2022	Dalian Pro youth	
49	Chen Yongze	(China)	(China) Putian	29 February 2004 (aged 18)	2022	Dalian Pro youth	
51	Li Jiaxiang	(China)	(China) Harbin	17 March 2003 (aged 19)	2022	Dalian Pro youth	
54	Ren Jian	(China)	(China) Wuhan	13 January 2003 (aged 19)	2022	Dalian Pro youth	
55	Chen Chenzhenyang	(China)	(China) Guiyang	9 June 2003 (aged 18)	2022	Dalian Pro youth	

== Coaching staff ==
As of 5 May 2022

Position	Name	Notes
First team
Head coach	(China) Xie Hui	
Assistant coach	(Hong Kong) Ng Wai Chiu	
Assistant coach	(China) Chang Lin	
Goalkeeping coach	(Brazil) Everton da Rocha Santos	
Fitness coach	(Spain) Alex Ros Cladella	
Tactical Analyst	(Spain) Aitor Calero Garcia	
Team doctor		
Reserve and youth teams
Reserve (U-23) coach	(Spain) David Rivas Martínez	
U-21 coach	(China) Liu Yujian	
U-21 assistant coach	(China) Zhou Ting	
U-19 coach	(China) Sun Wei	
U-17 coach	(China) Zhang Yaokun	
U-17 assistant coach	(China) Zou Peng	
U-17 assistant coach	(China) Li Wenbo	
U-15 coach	(China) Zhao Peng	
U-15 assistant coach	(China) Chi Yaojun	
U-14 coach	(China) Li Yang	
U-15 assistant coach	(China) Zou Jie	
U-13 coach	(China) Wang Zhaochen	

== Transfers ==
=== Pre-season ===
==== In ====
No.	Pos.	Name	Age	Moving from	Type	Transfer fee	Date	Notes	Ref.
-	MF	(China) Han Peijiang	21	(China) Xi'an Wolves	Loan Return	—	1 January		
17	FW	(China) Zhang Jiansheng	20	(China) Beijing BSU	Loan Return	—	1 January		
27	DF	(China) Yang Pengju	20	(China) Beijing BSU	Loan Return	—	1 January		
23	GK	(China) Li Xuebo	21	(China) Zibo Cuju	Loan Return	—	1 January		
-	MF	(China) Zheng Bofan	26	(China) Beijing BSU	Loan Return	—	1 January		
-	MF	(China) Liu Yingchen	28	(China) Dandong Tengyue	Loan Return	—	1 January		
8	DF	(China) Zhu Ting	36	(China) Qingdao	Transfer	Free	22 April		
2	DF	(China) Lin Longchang	32	(China) Guizhou	Transfer	Free	22 April		
31	MF	(China) Lü Peng	32	(China) Qingdao	Transfer	Free	22 April		
28	MF	(China) Fei Yu	31	(China) Nantong Zhiyun	Transfer	Free	22 April		
37	MF	(China) Ning Hao	37	(China) Liaoning Shenyang Urban	Transfer	Free	22 April		
39	FW	(China) Yan Xiangchuang	35	(China) Beijing BSU	Transfer	Free	22 April		
23	FW	(China) Shang Yin	33	(China) Jiangxi Beidamen	Transfer	Free	22 April		
33	MF	(China) Song Zhiwei	33	(China) Wuhan Yangtze River	Transfer	Free	28 April		
-	MF	(China) Chen Chenzhenyang	18	(China) Beijing Wanda	Transfer	Free	22 April	U-21 team	
-	MF	(China) Li Jiahao	20	(China) Zhejiang	Transfer	Free	22 April	U-21 team	
-	MF	(China) Zhong Yunxing	21	(Spain) Real Avilés B	Transfer	Free	22 April	U-21 team	
-	MF	(China) Elkut Eysajan	18	(China) Shandong Taishan	Transfer	Free	28 April	U-21 team	

==== Out ====
No.	Pos.	Name	Age	Moving to	Type	Transfer fee	Date	Notes	Ref.
37	DF	(China) Yang Haoyu	21	(China) Hubei Istar	End of Loan	—	—		
25	MF	(Brazil) Jailson Siqueira	26	(Brazil) Palmeiras	Released	Free	8 January		
6	MF	(China) Zhu Xiaogang	34	(China) Guangxi Yicheng	Transfer	Free	20 March		
20	MF	(China) Wang Jinxian	26	(China) Changchun Yatai	Transfer	Free	8 April		
24	MF	(China) Tao Qianglong	20	(China) Wuhan Threetowns	Transfer	Free	27 April		
7	MF	(China) Zhao Xuri	36	(China) Sichuan Jiuniu	Transfer	Free	28 April		
31	MF	(China) Zheng Long	32	(China) Qingdao Hainiu	Transfer	Free	28 April		
12	GK	(China) Xu Jiamin	28	(China) Tianjin Jinmen Tiger	Transfer	Free	28 April		
-	FW	(China) Chen Rong	21	(China) Liaoning Shenyang Urban	Loan	—	28 April		
40	MF	(China) Zhu Jiaxuan	23	(China) Liaoning Shenyang Urban	Loan	—	28 April		
-	MF	(China) Zhang Zimin	21	(China) Nanjing City	Transfer	Free	28 April		
-	GK	(China) Li Xuebo	22	(China) Zibo Cuju	Loan	—	28 April		
-	MF	(China) Chen Zhinan	21	(China) Guangxi Pingguo Haliao	Transfer	—	28 April		
-	MF	(China) Zhang Zimin	22	(China) Nanjing City	Transfer	—	28 April		
30	DF	(Sweden) Marcus Danielson	33	(Sweden) Djurgårdens IF	Released	—	18 July		
10	MF	(Sweden) Sam Larsson	29	(Turkey) Antalyaspor	Released	—	18 July		
21	FW	(Ghana) Emmanuel Boateng	26	(Portugal) Rio Ave	Released	—	17 August		

=== Mid-season ===
==== In ====
No.	Pos.	Name	Age	Moving from	Type	Transfer fee	Date	Notes	Ref.
10	MF	(Bulgaria) Borislav Tsonev	27	(Ukraine) Chornomorets Odesa	Transfer	Free	21 August		
17	FW	(Germany) Streli Mamba	28	(Uzbekistan) FC Kairat	Transfer	Free	21 August		
30	GK	(China) Wu Yan	33	(China) Shaanxi Chang'an Athletic	Transfer	Free	21 August		
21	MF	(China) Gui Zihan	19	(China) Tianjin Jinmen Tiger	Transfer	Free	21 August		
24	DF	(China) Liu Le	33	(China) Dalian Huayi	Transfer	Free	21 August		
44	DF	(Hong Kong) Vas Nuñez	26	(China) Meizhou Hakka	Transfer	Free	21 August		
45	FW	(Central African Republic) Lobi Manzoki	25	(Uganda) Vipers SC	Transfer	€200k	25 August		
40	MF	(Serbia) Nemanja Bosančić	27	(Finland) FC Lahti	Transfer	€100k	30 August		
-	MF	(China) Zhu Jiaxuan	23	(China) Liaoning Shenyang Urban	Loan return	—	1 August		

==== Out ====
No.	Pos.	Name	Age	Moving to	Type	Transfer fee	Date	Notes	Ref.
4	DF	(China) Li Shuai	26	(China) Shanghai Port	Released	Free	1 August		
12	MF	(China) Zhang Jiansheng	22	(China) Shaanxi Chang'an Athletic	Loan	—	8 August		
27	DF	(China) Yang Pengju	21	(China) Zibo Cuju	Loan	—	9 August		
29	MF	(China) Sun Bo	31	(China) Heilongjiang Ice City	Released	—	31 August		
40	MF	(China) Zhu Jiaxuan	23	(China) Heilongjiang Ice City	Loan	—	31 August		

== Friendlies ==
Preseason

21 April 2022 Friendly	Dalian Pro	2–2	Dalian Duxing	Dalian, Liaoning
11:00 (UTC+08:00)	Lin Liangming		Ge Yuxiang; Ji Zhengyu	Stadium: Dalian Pro Soccer Academy Base

13 May 2022 Friendly	Dalian Pro	2–1	Dalian Duxing	Dalian, Liaoning
	Zhao Jianbo; Sun Guowen		Yan Peng	Stadium: Dalian Pro Soccer Academy Base

16 May 2022 Friendly	Dalian Pro	1–1	Tianjin Jinmen Tiger	Dalian
	Zhao Jianbo		Wang Qiuming	Stadium: Dalian Pro Soccer Academy Base

25 May 2022 Friendly	Dalian Pro	4–0	Shanghai Port	Dalian, Liaoning
	Lin Liangming; Yan Xiangchuang; Shang Yin; Fei Yu	Report		Stadium: Dalian Pro Soccer Academy Base

Interval

23 July 2022 Friendly	Dalian Pro	2–0	Dalian Jinshiwan	Dalian, Liaoning
17:00 (UTC+08:00)	Lü Peng; Yan Xiangchuang			Stadium: Puwan Stadium

30 July 2022 Friendly	Dalian Pro	4–0	Dalian Huayi	Dalian, Liaoning
15:00 (UTC+08:00)	Yan Xiangchuang; Cui Ming'an; Fei Yu; Wang Tengda			Stadium: Puwan Stadium

14 September 2022 Friendly	Dalian Pro	–	Dalian Pro youth	Dalian, Liaoning
16:30 (UTC+08:00)				Stadium: Puwan Stadium

== Chinese Super League ==
=== Standings ===
Pos	Team	Pld	W	D	L	GF	GA	GD	Pts
9	Meizhou Hakka	34	14	7	13	43	41	+2	49 (Note: Tianjin Jinmen Tiger finished ahead of Meizhou Hakka on head-to-head points: Tianjin Jinmen Tiger 1–0 Meizhou Hakka, Meizhou Hakka 1–1 Tianjin Jinmen Tiger.)
10	Shanghai Shenhua (Note: Shanghai Shenhua had 6 points deducted due to unpaid salaries on 23 November 2022.)	34	14	11	9	42	34	+8	47
11	Dalian Pro (Note: After Dalian Pro had defeated Guangzhou City 2–0, Chinese Football Association awarded Guangzhou City a 3–0 win as a result of Dalian Pro failing to field at least one U-23 player on the field when Dalian Pro substituted off Huang Jiahui, their only U-23 player on the field, at the 67th minute for non U-23 player Wu Wei and substituted on two U-23 players at the 69th minute.)	34	12	9	13	49	53	−4	45
12	Cangzhou Mighty Lions	34	11	11	12	47	51	−4	44 (Note: Cangzhou Mighty Lions finished ahead of Changchun Yatai on head-to-head goal difference: Cangzhou Mighty Lions 1–2 Changchun Yatai, Changchun Yatai 0–2 Cangzhou Mighty Lions.)
13	Changchun Yatai	34	11	11	12	49	50	−1	44

Source: Soccerway
Rules for classification:
- During season: 1) Points; 2) Goal difference; 3) Goals scored.
- After season: 1) Points; 2) Head-to-head points; 3) Head-to-head goal difference; 4) Head-to-head goals scored; 5) Scores of the weight ratio of the reserve league and youth leagues.
  Notes:

=== Results summary ===
Overall								Home						Away					
Pld	W	D	L	GF	GA	GD	Pts	W	D	L	GF	GA	GD	W	D	L	GF	GA	GD
34	12	9	13	49	53	−4	45	6	5	6	25	25	0	6	4	7	24	28	−4

=== Positions by round ===
Round	1	2	3	4	5	6	7	8	9	10	11	12	13	14	15	16	17	18	19	20	21	22	23	24	25	26	27	28	29	30	31	32	33	34
Ground	A	H	A	H	A	H	A	H	A	H	H	H	A	A	H	H	H	H	H	H	A	H	A	A	H	A	H	A	A	A	H	A	A	A
Result	D	L	D	D	L	L	W	D	L	L	D	W	D	L	W	W	D	L	L	W	L	W	L	L	D	D	W	W	W	W	L	L	W	L
Position	8	7	9	8	9	14	12	13	15	14	15	14	14	14	14	13	12	12	14	13	14	13	14	12	12	12	12	12	11	10	10	11	10	11

Updated to match(es) played on 31 December. Source: Results
A = Away; H = Home; W = Win; D = Draw; L = Loss
View source data.

=== Fixtures and results ===
Some matches were postponed due to temporary COVID restrictions, and were recorded by actual order, while their original rounds were tagged afterwards with brackets.

==== Stage 1-Group B (Haikou Stadia) ====
4 June 2022 1	Henan Songshan Longmen	2–2	Dalian Pro	Haikou, Hainan
19:30 (UTC+08:00)	Zhao Honglüe (yellow card) 5'; Zhao Yuhao 30'; Karanga 90+1'	Report	Fei Yu (yellow card) 7'; Lin Liangming 11', 69'; Dong Yanfeng (yellow card) 55'; Sun Guowen (yellow card) 87'	Stadium: Wuyuan River Stadium training pitch Referee: Gu Chunhan; Assistant referees: Tang Rongdi, Li Xingfeng; Fourth official: Wan Tao

8 June 2022 2	Dalian Pro	0–3	Guangzhou City	Haikou, Hainan
19:30 (UTC+08:00)	Sun Guowen 6'; Yan Xiangchuang 22'; Zhang Chong (yellow card) 58'; Lin Longchang (yellow card) 90+1'	Report	Chen Yajun (yellow card) 88'	Stadium: Wuyuan River Stadium; Referee: Niu Minghui; Assistant referees: Ma Ji, Yang Xi; Fourth official: He Kai

12 June 2022 3	Changchun Yatai	1–1	Dalian Pro	Haikou, Hainan
19:30 (UTC+08:00)	Erik Lima 59'	Report	Shang Yin 9' (yellow card) 39'; Huang Jiahui (yellow card) 30'; Lin Longchang (yellow card) 56'; Yan Xiangchuang (yellow card) 62'	Stadium: Wuyuan River Stadium; Referee: Huang Yi; Assistant referees: Luo Zheng, Zhang Haijun; Fourth official: Li Haixin

16 June 2022 4	Dalian Pro	1–1	Zhejiang	Haikou, Hainan
17:30 (UTC+08:00)	Sun Guowen 45+3'; Lü Peng (yellow card) 57'; Huang Jiahui (yellow card) 59'; Wang Zhen'ao (yellow card) 70'	Report	Gu Bin (yellow card) 3'; Zhao Bo (yellow card) 41'; Gao Tianyu (yellow card) 60'; Nyasha Mushekwi 70'	Stadium: Mission Hills Soccer Academy Stadium; Referee: Gu Chunhan; Assistant referees: Sun Kai, Tang Rongdi; Fourth official: Wan Tao

21 June 2022 5	Shandong Taishan	3–0	Dalian Pro	Haikou, Hainan
20:00 (UTC+08:00)	Fellaini 68'; Moises 85'; Qi Tianyu 90+3'	Report	Lü Peng (yellow card) 62'	Stadium: Wuyuan River Stadium; Referee: Huang Yi; Assistant referees: Luo ZHeng, Yuan Kun; Fourth official: Liu Zhao

24 June 2022 6	Dalian Pro	0–2	Henan Songshan Longmen	Haikou, Hainan
19:30 (UTC+08:00)	Wu Wei (yellow card) 39'; He Yupeng (yellow card) 56'; Fei Yu (yellow card) 84'	Report	Ma Xingyu (red card) 25'; Karanga 40'; Wang Shangyuan (yellow card) 65'; Dourado 76' (pen.)	Stadium: Wuyuan River Stadium training pitch Referee: Zhen Wei; Assistant referees: Luo Zheng, Li Yingbin; Fourth official: Wan Tao

28 June 2022 7	Guangzhou City	0–3	Dalian Pro	Haikou, Hainan
19:30 (UTC+08:00)		Report	He Yupeng 18'; Lin Longchang (yellow card) 22'; Lü Peng (yellow card) 25'; Yan Xiangchuang 31'; Lin Liangming 49'	Stadium: Mission Hills Soccer Academy Stadium; Referee: Wang Di; Assistant referees: Sun Kai, Li Yingbin; Fourth official: Wan Tao

2 July 2022 8	Dalian Pro	2–2	Changchun Yatai	Haikou, Hainan
18:30 (UTC+08:00)	Shang Yin 25'; Wu Wei 70'; Fei Yu (yellow card) 73'	Report	Jores Okore 66'; Júnior Negrão 86'; Zhang Li 90+4'	Stadium: Wuyuan River Stadium training pitch Referee: Zhen Wei; Assistant referees: Luo Zheng, Zhang Haijin; Fourth official: Liu Zhao

6 July 2022 9	Zhejiang	2–0	Dalian Pro	Haikou, Hainan
18:30 (UTC+08:00)	Sun Zheng'ao (yellow card) 23'; Nyasha Mushekwi 26'; Yue Xin (yellow card) 45+1'; Dong Yu (yellow card) 56'; Gu Bin (red card) 74'; Zhao Bo (yellow card) 90+1'; Ablikim Abdusalam (yellow card) 90+2'	Report	Wang Xianjun 50' (o.g.); Sun Guowen (red card) 74'	Stadium: Mission Hills Soccer Academy Stadium; Referee: Ai Kun; Assistant referees: Ma Ji, Luo Zheng; Fourth official: Wan Tao

10 July 2022 10	Dalian Pro	1–3	Shandong Taishan	Haikou, Hainan
18:30 (UTC+08:00)	Huang Jiahui (yellow card) 45+2'; He Yupeng (yellow card) 69'; Zhu Ting 90+1'; Fei Yu (yellow card) 90+3'	Report	Liao Lisheng 41'; Marouane Fellaini 52'; Wang Tong (yellow card) 62'; Cryzan 83'; Chen Pu (yellow card) 90+3'	Stadium: Mission Hills Soccer Academy Stadium; Referee: Zhen Wei; Assistant referees: Ma Ji, Sun Kai; Fourth official: Liu Zhao

==== Stage 2 ====
6 August 2022 11	Dalian Pro	1–1	Shanghai Port	Dalian, Liaoning
17:30 (UTC+08:00)	Lin Liangming 60'	Report	Lü Wenjun 20'; Yu Hai (yellow card) 40'	Stadium: Puwan Stadium; Attendance: 15,968; Referee: Fu Ming; Assistant referees: Ma Ji, Wu Huifeng; Fourth official: Guan Xing

12 August 2022 12	Dalian Pro	–	Shenzhen	Dalian, Liaoning
		Postponed due to regional COVID restrictions		Stadium: Puwan Stadium

18 August 2022 12(14)	Dalian Pro	2–0	Cangzhou Mighty Lions	Dalian, Liaoning
19:30 (UTC+08:00)	Shang Yin 5'; Fei Yu (yellow card) 19'; Tong Lei (yellow card) 24'; Lin Liangming 39'; Lü Peng (yellow card) 65'	Report	Chen Zhongliu (yellow card) 75'	Stadium: Puwan Stadium; Attendance: 16,461; Referee: Ma Li; Assistant referees: Yang Yang, Zhao Wei; Fourth official: Wan Tao

24 August 2022 13	Guangzhou	0–0	Dalian Pro	Guangzhou, Guangdong
19:30 (UTC+08:00)	Huang Guangliang (yellow card) 31'; Wu Shaocong (yellow card) 37'; Chen Rijin (yellow card) 49' (yellow-red card) 56'; Li Xuepeng (yellow card) 62'	Report	Lü Zhuoyi (yellow card) 2'	Stadium: Huadu Stadium; Referee: Guan Xing; Assistant referees: Wu Huifeng, Ma Kexi; Fourth official: Ai Kun

27 August 2022 14(15)	Meizhou Hakka	4–2	Dalian Pro	Meizhou, Guangdong
19:30 (UTC+08:00)	Rodrigo Henrique 16'; Cui Wei 48'; Vukanović 73'; Yin Hongbo 76'	Report	Shang Yin 2'; Tsonev 87'	Stadium: Wuhua County Olympic Sports Centre; Referee: Shi Zhenlu; Assistant referees: Xi Fei, Wang Xihong; Fourth official: Sun Shengyu

1 September 2022 15(12)	Dalian Pro	5–1	Shenzhen	Dalian, Liaoning
19:30 (UTC+08:00)	Fei Yu 14', 37'; Tong Lei (yellow card) 32'; Tsonev 46'; Lin Liangming 82'; Wang Xianjun (yellow card) 60'; Mamba 73'; Shang Yin (yellow card) 75'	Report	Yeljan Shinar 9'; Li Yuanyi (yellow card) 45'; Lim Chai-min (yellow card) 60'; Pei Shuai (yellow card) 76'	Stadium: Puwan Stadium; Referee: Memetjan Ahmat; Assistant referees: Tang Chao, Zhang Meilin; Fourth official: Shi Zhenlu

20 September 2022 16	Dalian Pro	2–1	Hebei	Dalian, Liaoning
19:30 (UTC+08:00)	Tsonev 13'; Yan Xiangchuang 43'	Report	Gao Huaze 31'; Bao Yaxiong (yellow card) 33'; Xu Tianyuan (yellow card) 83'; Chen Yunhua (yellow card) 89'	Stadium: Puwan Stadium; Referee: Dai Yige; Assistant referees: Guo Jingtao, Wu Mingfeng; Fourth official: Liang Songshang

24 September 2022 17	Dalian Pro	2–2	Beijing Guoan	Dalian, Liaoning
19:30 (UTC+08:00)	Tsonev 7'; Manzoki 83'	Report	Chi Zhongguo (yellow card) 19'; Zhang Xizhe 25'; Adegbenro (yellow card) 72'; Zhang Yuning 81'	Stadium: Puwan Stadium; Referee: Ma Ning; Assistant referees: Hu Chengjun, Guan Changliang; Fourth official: Jia Zhiliang

29 September 2022 18	Dalian Pro	1–2	Shanghai Shenhua	Dalian, Liaoning
19:30 (UTC+08:00)	Huang Jiahui (yellow card) 38'; Liu Le (yellow card) 45'; Dong Yanfeng 59'; Nunez (yellow card) 65'	Report	Yang Xu (yellow card) 20'; Zhu Jianrong 88', 90'	Stadium: Puwan Stadium; Referee: Gu Chunhan; Assistant referees: Ma Ji, Sun Kai; Fourth official: Hei Xiaohu

4 October 2022 19(21)	Dalian Pro	0–2	Tianjin Jinmen Tiger	Dalian, Liaoning
17:30 (UTC+08:00)	Fei Yu (yellow card) 43'; Nunez (yellow card) 80'	Report	Wang Qiuming 13'; David Andújar (yellow card) 45' (goal) 81'; Fang Jingqi (yellow card) 71'; Fran Mérida (yellow card) 90+4'	Stadium: Puwan Stadium; Referee: Ma Li; Assistant referees: Zhao Wei, Wang Xihong; Fourth official: Sun Lei

9 October 2022 20(22)	Dalian Pro	2–0	Chengdu Rongcheng	Dalian, Liaoning
19:30 (UTC+08:00)	Shang Yin 38'; Fei Yu (yellow card) 43'; Lü Peng (yellow card) 68'; Zhang Chong (yellow card) 82'; Mamba 90+2'	Report	Liu Tao (yellow card) 34'; Hu Ruibao (yellow card) 76'	Stadium: Puwan Stadium; Referee: Xing Qi; Assistant referees: Xi Fei, Kong Lingda; Fourth official: Xu Qiangqiang

25 October 2022 21(19)	Wuhan Three Towns	4–0	Dalian Pro	Wuhan, Hubei
19:30 (UTC+08:00)	Liu Yiming (yellow card) 8'; Marcão 28', 31'; Davidson 46'; Ademilson 84'	Report	Dong Yanfeng (yellow card) 11'; Lü Peng (yellow card) 23'; Wang Xianjun (yellow card) 45+2'; Huang Jiahui (yellow card) 80'	Stadium: Wuhan Sports Center; Referee: Wang Di; Assistant referees: Ma Kexi, Guan Changliang; Fourth official: Wan Tao

30 October 2022 22(20)	Dalian Pro	2–1	Wuhan Yangtze River	Dalian, Liaoning
19:30 (UTC+08:00)	Lin Liangming 43' (pen.); Shang Yin (yellow card) 59'; Fei Yu (yellow card) 89' (goal) 90'	Report	Han Xuan (yellow card) 20'; Hu Jinghang 28'; Nie Aoshuang (yellow card) 61'; Kajević (yellow card) 90+5'	Stadium: Puwan Stadium; Attendance: 6,148; Referee: Tang Shunqi; Assistant referees: Tang Chao, Zhang Haijun; Fourth official: Sun Shengyu

4 November 2022 23	Shanghai Port	2–1	Dalian Pro	Dalian, Liaoning
17:30 (UTC+08:00)	Wu Lei 19'; Feng Jin 79'	Report	Liu Le (yellow card) 15'; Tsonev (yellow card) 49'; Manzoki 51'	Stadium: Dalian Sports Center; Referee: Du Jianxin; Assistant referees: Guo Jingtao, Tang Chao; Fourth official: Zhen Wei

8 November 2022 24	Shenzhen	0–2	Dalian Pro	Haikou, Hainan
20:00 (UTC+08:00)	Alessandrini (yellow card) 79'	Report	He Yupeng (yellow card) 21'; Song Zhiwei (yellow card) 48'; Lin Liangming 51'; Mamba 72'; Fei Yu (yellow card) 85'	Stadium: Wuyuan River Stadium; Referee: Zhen Wei; Assistant referees: Sun Kai, Sun Jin; Fourth official: Liu Zhao

13 November 2022 25	Dalian Pro	1–1	Guangzhou	Dalian, Liaoning
15:00 (UTC+08:00)	Lü Peng 47'; He Yupeng (yellow card) 66'; Sun Guowen (yellow card) 90+4'	Report	Cai Mingmin 6' (yellow card) 35'; Rong Hao (yellow card) 26'; Zhang Xiuwei (yellow card) 90+1'	Stadium: Dalian Sports Center; Referee: Huang Yi; Assistant referees: Zhang Cheng, Tang Chao; Fourth official: Sun Lei

22 November 2022 26	Cangzhou Mighty Lions	1–1	Dalian Pro	Haikou, Hainan
19:00 (UTC+08:00)	Lü Peng (yellow card) 76'; Shang Yin 89'	Report	José Kanté 51'	Stadium: Wuyuan River Stadium; Referee: Shen Yinhao; Assistant referees: Deng Bo, Zhao Wei; Fourth official: Xu Qiangqiang

26 November 2022 27	Dalian Pro	2–1	Meizhou Hakka	Dalian, Liaoning
15:00 (UTC+08:00)	Tsonev 27' (pen.); Shang Yin 90+2'	Report	Cai Haochang (yellow card) 50'; Shi Liang (yellow card) 56'; Liao Junjian 79'	Stadium: Dalian Sports Center; Referee: Huang Yi; Assistant referees: Ma Ji, Zhang Meilin; Fourth official: Wan Tao

30 November 2022 28	Hebei	1–4	Dalian Pro	Haikou, Hainan
19:00 (UTC+08:00)	Liao Wei 77'	Report	Lin Liangming 16'; Lin Longchang (yellow card) 47'; Yan Xiangchuang 67'; Tsonev (penalty missed) 45+3' 81' (yellow card) 89'; Fei Yu 86'	Stadium: Wuyuan River Stadium; Referee: Du Jianxin; Assistant referees: Tang Chao, Wu Mingfeng; Fourth official: Zhen Wei

5 December 2022 29	Beijing Guoan	1–3	Dalian Pro	Rizhao, Shandong
15:30 (UTC+08:00)	Zhang Xizhe (yellow card) 31'; Wang Ziming 90+2'	Report	Lin Liangming 49', 76'; Lü Peng 88'	Stadium: Rizhao International Football Center Stadium; Referee: He Kai; Assistant referees: Ma Ji, Guan Changliang; Fourth official: Sun Lei

9 December 2022 30	Shanghai Shenhua	1–2	Dalian Pro	Jinjiang, Fujian
19:30 (UTC+08:00)	Sun Shilin (yellow card) 20'; Yang Xu (red card) 34'; Zhu Jianrong 48'; Wang Haijian (yellow card) 90+2'	Report	Tsonev 50'; Shang Yin (yellow card) 81'; Lin Liangming 82'	Stadium: Jinjiang Sports Center Stadium; Referee: Zhang Long; Assistant referees: Wang Xihong, Yuan Kun; Fourth official: Sun Lei

15 December 2022 31	Dalian Pro	1–2	Wuhan Threetowns	Dalian, Liaoning
15:00 (UTC+08:00)	Zhao Jianbo 55'; Kudirat (yellow card) 57'	Report	Yaki Yen (yellow card) 78'; Davidson (yellow card) 81'; Stanciu (yellow card) 82' (yellow-red card) 90+3'; Marcão 85', 86'; Wallace (yellow card) 90+5'	Stadium: Dalian Sports Center Stadium; Referee: Huang Yi; Assistant referees: Zhang Cheng. Deng Bo; Fourth official: Wu Liying

23 December 2022 32	Wuhan Yangtze River	3–0	Dalian Pro	Wuhan, Hubei
15:00 (UTC+08:00)	Chen Yuhao 17'; Kajević (yellow card) 37'; Brown Forbes 43'; Li Peng 49'	Report	Lü Zhuoyi (yellow card) 46'; Wang Tengda (yellow card) 64'	Stadium: Wuhan Five Rings Sports Center; Referee: Wang Zhe; Assistant referees: Guo Jingtao, Sun Jin; Fourth official: Li Haixin

27 December 2022 33	Tianjin Jinmen Tiger	0–3	Dalian Pro	Haikou, Hainan
20:00 (UTC+08:00)				Stadium: Mission Hills Soccer Academy Stadium

31 December 2022 34	Chengdu Rongcheng	0–3	Dalian Pro	Chengdu, Sichuan
15:00 (UTC+08:00)	Tim Chow 21', 59'; Felipe (yellow card) 45+2'; Kim Min-woo (yellow card) 73'; Mutellip 86'	Report	Zhao Jia'nan (yellow card) 15'; Lin Longchang (yellow card) 19'; Huang Jianhui (yellow card) 45+2'; Zhu Ting (red card) 68'; Lin Liangming (yellow card) 90+1'	Stadium: Chengdu Fenghuangshan Stadium; Referee: Wang Zhe; Assistant referees: Hu Chengjun, Yang Yang; Fourth official: Niu Minghui

== Chinese FA Cup ==
=== FA Cup fixtures and results ===
18 November 2022 2rd	Dalian Pro	0–1	Zhejiang
15:30 (UTC+08:00)	Wang Xianjun (yellow card) 89'; Mamba (yellow card) 90+4'		Sun Zheng'ao 39'; Bao Shengxin (yellow card) 50'; Yao Junsheng (yellow card) 62'	Referee: Du Jianxin; Assistant referees: Wang Xihong, Li Peng; Fourth official: Cui Tingbin

== Squad statistics ==
=== Appearances and goals ===
No.	Pos.	Player	Nat.	Super League			FA Cup			Total		
No.	Pos.	Player	Nat.	App.	Starts	Goals	App.	Starts	Goals	App.	Starts	Goals
1	GK	Zhang Chong	(China)	14	13	0	1	1	0	15	14	0
2	DF	Lin Longchang	(China)	24	16	0	1	1	0	25	17	0
3	DF	Shan Pengfei	(China)	9	1	0	0	0	0	9	1	0
5	MF	Wu Wei	(China)	10	3	1	0	0	0	10	3	1
6	DF	Wang Xianjun	(China)	15	10	0	1	1	0	16	11	0
7	MF	Lin Liangming	(China)	28	21	12	0	0	0	28	21	12
8	DF	Zhu Ting	(China)	15	10	1	1	0	0	16	10	1
9	FW	Shan Huanhuan	(China)	3	0	0	0	0	0	3	0	0
10	MF	Borislav Tsonev	(Bulgaria)	19	15	7	1	1	0	20	16	7
11	DF	Sun Guowen	(China)	26	22	2	1	0	0	27	22	2
12	FW	Zhang Jiansheng	(China)	0	0	0	0	0	0	0	0	0
13	DF	Wang Yaopeng	(China)	13	3	0	1	1	0	14	4	0
14	DF	Huang Jiahui	(China)	30	29	0	0	0	0	30	29	0
15	FW	Zhao Jianbo	(China)	11	2	1	0	0	0	11	2	1
16	DF	Tong Lei	(China)	9	8	0	0	0	0	9	8	0
17	FW	Streli Mamba	(Germany)	16	9	3	1	1	0	17	10	3
18	DF	He Yupeng	(China)	16	11	1	1	1	0	17	12	1
19	MF	Wang Zhen'ao	(China)	3	1	0	0	0	0	3	1	0
20	MF	Wang Tengda	(China)	12	2	0	0	0	0	12	2	0
21	MF	Gui Zihan	(China)	4	3	0	1	1	0	5	4	0
22	DF	Dong Yanfeng	(China)	19	19	1	0	0	0	19	19	1
23	FW	Shang Yin	(China)	30	24	7	1	0	0	31	24	7
24	DF	Liu Le	(China)	5	3	0	1	1	0	6	4	0
25	FW	Feng Zeyuan	(China)	0	0	0	0	0	0	0	0	0
26	MF	Cui Ming'an	(China)	6	4	0	1	1	0	7	5	0
28	MF	Fei Yu	(China)	28	24	4	0	0	0	28	24	4
30	GK	Wu Yan	(China)	13	13	0	0	0	0	13	13	0
31	MF	Lü Peng	(China)	30	27	2	1	0	0	31	27	2
32	GK	Kudirat Ablet	(China)	4	4	0	0	0	0	4	4	0
33	MF	Song Zhiwei	(China)	14	8	0	0	0	0	14	8	0
35	MF	Wang Yu	(China)	1	0	0	0	0	0	1	0	0
36	GK	Wang Jinshuai	(China)	4	3	0	0	0	0	4	3	0
37	MF	Ning Hao	(China)	2	0	0	0	0	0	2	0	0
38	MF	Lü Zhuoyi	(China)	14	10	0	0	0	0	14	10	0
39	FW	Yan Xiangchuang	(China)	28	24	4	1	1	0	29	25	4
40	MF	Nemanja Bosančić	(Serbia)	10	7	0	0	0	0	10	7	0
44	DF	Vas Nuñez	(Hong Kong)	6	6	0	0	0	0	6	6	0
45	FW	Lobi Manzoki	(Central African Republic)	10	3	2	1	0	0	11	3	2
47	DF	Zhao Jianan	(China)	2	2	0	0	0	0	2	2	0
48	DF	Eysajan	(China)	1	1	0	0	0	0	1	1	0
49	FW	Chen Yongze	(China)	1	1	0	0	0	0	1	1	0
54	DF	Ren Jian	(China)	1	1	0	0	0	0	1	1	0
TOTALS						48			0			48

=== Goalscorers ===
Rank	Player	Goals (Penalties)		
Rank	Player	Super League	FA Cup	Total
1	Lin Liangming	12 (1)	0	12
2	Shang Yin	7	0	7
2	Tsonev	7 (1)	0	7
4	Yan Xiangchuang	4	0	4
4	Fei Yu	4	0	4
6	Mamba	3	0	3
7	Sun Guowen	2	0	2
7	Manzoki	2	0	2
7	Lü Peng	2	0	2
10	Dong Yanfeng	1	0	1
10	He Yupeng	1	0	1
10	Wu Wei	1	0	1
10	Zhao Jianbo	1	0	1
10	Zhu Ting	1	0	1
TOTALS		48	0	48

Last updated: 31 Dec. 2022.
Source: Results

=== Disciplinary record ===
No.	Pos.	Player	Super League			FA Cup			Total		
No.	Pos.	Player	Yellow card	(yellow card) (yellow-red card)	Red card	Yellow card	(yellow card) (yellow-red card)	Red card	Yellow card	(yellow card) (yellow-red card)	Red card
1	GK	Zhang Chong	2	0	0	0	0	0	2	0	0
2	DF	Lin Longchang	5	0	0	0	0	0	5	0	0
3	DF	Shan Pengfei	0	0	0	0	0	0	0	0	0
5	MF	Wu Wei	1	0	0	0	0	0	1	0	0
6	DF	Wang Xianjun	2	0	0	1	0	0	3	0	0
7	MF	Lin Liangming	1	0	0	0	0	0	1	0	0
8	DF	Zhu Ting	0	0	1	0	0	0	0	0	1
9	FW	Shan Huanhuan	0	0	0	0	0	0	0	0	0
10	MF	Borislav Tsonev	2	0	0	0	0	0	2	0	0
11	DF	Sun Guowen	2	0	1	0	0	0	2	0	1
12	FW	Zhang Jiansheng	0	0	0	0	0	0	0	0	0
13	DF	Wang Yaopeng	0	0	0	0	0	0	0	0	0
14	DF	Huang Jiahui	6	0	0	0	0	0	6	0	0
15	FW	Zhao Jianbo	0	0	0	0	0	0	0	0	0
16	DF	Tong Lei	2	0	0	0	0	0	2	0	0
17	FW	Streli Mamba	0	0	0	1	0	0	1	0	0
18	DF	He Yupeng	4	0	0	0	0	0	4	0	0
19	MF	Wang Zhen'ao	1	0	0	0	0	0	1	0	0
20	MF	Wang Tengda	1	0	0	0	0	0	1	0	0
21	MF	Gui Zihan	0	0	0	0	0	0	0	0	0
22	DF	Dong Yanfeng	2	0	0	0	0	0	2	0	0
23	FW	Shang Yin	4	0	0	0	0	0	4	0	0
24	DF	Liu Le	2	0	0	0	0	0	2	0	0
25	FW	Feng Zeyuan	0	0	0	0	0	0	0	0	0
26	MF	Cui Ming'an	0	0	0	0	0	0	0	0	0
28	MF	Fei Yu	9	0	0	0	0	0	9	0	0
30	GK	Wu Yan	0	0	0	0	0	0	0	0	0
31	MF	Lü Peng	7	0	0	0	0	0	7	0	0
32	GK	Kudirat Ablet	1	0	0	0	0	0	1	0	0
33	MF	Song Zhiwei	1	0	0	0	0	0	1	0	0
35	MF	Wang Yu	0	0	0	0	0	0	0	0	0
36	GK	Wang Jinshuai	0	0	0	0	0	0	0	0	0
37	MF	Ning Hao	0	0	0	0	0	0	0	0	0
38	MF	Lü Zhuoyi	2	0	0	0	0	0	2	0	0
39	FW	Yan Xiangchuang	1	0	0	0	0	0	1	0	0
40	MF	Nemanja Bosančić	0	0	0	0	0	0	0	0	0
44	DF	Vas Nuñez	2	0	0	0	0	0	2	0	0
45	FW	Lobi Manzoki	0	0	0	0	0	0	0	0	0
47	DF	Zhao Jianan	1	0	0	0	0	0	1	0	0
48	DF	Eysajan	0	0	0	0	0	0	0	0	0
49	FW	Chen Yongze	0	0	0	0	0	0	0	0	0
54	DF	Ren Jian	0	0	0	0	0	0	0	0	0
TOTALS			61	0	2	2	0	0	63	0	2

=== Injuries ===
Name	Injury	Duration	Notes
Wang Zhen'ao	ACL tear	26 Jun.–	
Song Zhiwei	Achilles tendon injury	Jun.–Oct.	
Shan Huanhuan	Strain	Unknown	
Dong Yanfeng	Strain	24 Aug.–20 Sep. 25 Oct.–	
Bosančić	Partial Achilles tendon rupture	17 Sep.–Nov.	
Zhu Ting	Cut on eyebrow and eyelid, orbital fracture	17 Sep.–Nov.	
Vas Nuñez	Cut on back of the head	29 Sep.–9 Oct.	
Vas Nuñez	MCL injury	November–	

=== Suspensions ===
Player	Length	Reason	Duration	Opponent	Ref.
Sun Guowen	1 match	Red card vs. Zhejiang	10 Jul.	Shandong Taishan	
Fei Yu	1 match	4 Yellow cards accumulated	6 Aug.	Shanghai Port	
Sun Guowen	4 matches	Violence behavior (kicking opponent player in the abdomen) during the match against Zhejiang	6 Aug.–27 Aug.		
Lü Peng	1 match	4 Yellow cards accumulated	24 Aug.	Guangzhou	
Huang Jiahui	1 match	4 Yellow cards accumulated	4 Oct.	Tianjin JM Tiger	
Fei Yu	1 match	4 Yellow cards accumulated	4 Nov.	Shanghai Port	
He Yupeng	1 match	4 Yellow cards accumulated	22 Nov.	Cangzhou Mighty Lions	
Lin Longchang	1 match	4 Yellow cards accumulated	5 Dec.	Beijing Guoan	
Shang Yin	1 match	4 Yellow cards accumulated	15 Dec.	Wuhan Threetowns	
