= Bosančić =

Bosančić is a surname. Notable people with the surname include:

- Jovo Bosančić (born 1970), Serbian footballer
- Miloš Bosančić (born 1988), Serbian footballer
- Nemanja Bosančić (born 1995), Serbian footballer
- Petar Bosančić (born 1996), Croatian footballer
