= 2022 Chinese Super League =

Chinese Super League
- Season: 2022
- Dates: 3 June – 31 December
- Champions: Wuhan Three Towns; 1st CSL title 1st Chinese title
- Relegated: Guangzhou
- AFC Champions League: Wuhan Three Towns; Shandong Taishan; Zhejiang; Shanghai Port
- Matches: 306
- Goals: 875 (2.86 per match)
- Top goalscorer: Marcão (27 goals)
- Biggest home win: Shandong Taishan 8–0 Shenzhen (19 December 2022)
- Biggest away win: Hebei 0–7 Shandong Taishan (15 August 2022)
- Highest scoring: Henan Songshan Longmen 6–2 Changchun Yatai (11 July 2022); Hebei 1–7 Changchun Yatai (19 August 2022); Shandong Taishan 8–0 Shenzhen (19 December 2022)
- Longest winning run: 12 matches Wuhan Three Towns
- Longest unbeaten run: 17 matches Wuhan Three Towns
- Longest winless run: 23 matches Hebei
- Longest losing run: 23 matches Hebei

The 2022 Ping An Chinese Football Association Super League (Chinese: 2022中国平安中国足球协会超级联赛) was the 19th season since the establishment of the Chinese Super League. The league title sponsor is Ping An Insurance. Shandong Taishan were the defending champions.

On May 23, the league was confirmed to start from June 3.

Affected by the COVID-19 pandemic, the competition system is still adopted in the first stage of this season, and it is planned to return to the home and away competition system from August 5, 2022 (from 11th round).

== Format ==
The format of the season was revealed on 13 May 2022. In the first stage (round 1–10), 18 teams will be divided into three groups. The hosts were allocated to each group and other teams will be drawn based on last season's rankings.

=== Groups ===
The draw for the first stage was revealed on 13 May 2022.

Team	2021 season	Draw order	No.	Group
Meizhou Hakka	CL1, 2nd (Host)	-	A1	A
Beijing Guoan	5th	5	A2	A
Shenzhen	6th	6	A3	A
Cangzhou Mighty Lions	11th	11	A4	A
Tianjin Jinmen Tiger	12th	12	A5	A
Chengdu Rongcheng	CL1, 4th	17	A6	A
Shandong Taishan	1st	1	B1	B
Changchun Yatai	4th	4	B2	B
Guangzhou City	7th	7	B3	B
Henan Songshan Longmen	10th	10	B4	B
Dalian Pro	15th	13	B5	B
Zhejiang	CL1, 3rd	16	B6	B
Shanghai Port	2nd	2	C1	C
Guangzhou	3rd	3	C2	C
Hebei	8th	8	C3	C
Shanghai Shenhua	9th	9	C4	C
Wuhan Yangtze River	14th	14	C5	C
Wuhan Three Towns	CL1, 1st	15	C6	C

=== Centralised venues ===
- Meizhou (Group A)
  - Hengbei Football Town Field No.9
  - Meixian Tsang Hin-chi Stadium
  - Wuhua County Olympic Sports Centre
- Haikou (Group B)
  - Haikou Mission Hills Football Training Base
  - Wuyuan River Stadium
  - Wuyuan River Stadium Outer Field No.2
- Dalian (Group C)
  - Jinzhou Stadium
  - Puwan Stadium
- Jinjiang
  - Jinjiang Football Training Center Stadium
  - Jinjiang Sports Center Stadium

== Clubs ==
=== Club changes ===
==== To Super League ====
**Clubs promoted from 2021 China League One**

- Wuhan Three Towns
- Meizhou Hakka
- Zhejiang
- Chengdu Rongcheng

==== From Super League ====
**Dissolved entries**

- ~~Chongqing Liangjiang Athletic~~
- ~~Qingdao~~

Zhejiang returned to the division after a 5-year absence; Wuhan Three Towns, Meizhou Hakka and Chengdu Rongcheng all compete in the Chinese Super League for the first time in their respective histories. Dalian Pro were reprieved from relegation after losing the relegation play-off ties following the dissolution of Chongqing Liangjiang Athletic and Qingdao.

==== Name changes ====
- Wuhan F.C. changed their name to Wuhan Yangtze River in March 2022.

=== Clubs information ===
Team	Head coach	City	Stadium	Capacity	2021 season
Shandong Taishan	(China) Hao Wei	Jinan	Jinan Olympic Sports Center Stadium	56,808	1st
Shanghai Port	(China) Xi Zhikang (caretaker)	Shanghai	Dalian Sports Centre Stadium (Dalian)	60,832	2nd
Guangzhou	(China) Zheng Zhi	Guangzhou	Huadu Stadium	13,395	3rd
Changchun Yatai	(China) Chen Yang	Changchun	Changchun Stadium	41,638	4th
Beijing Guoan	(Netherlands) Stanley Menzo	Beijing	Rizhao International Football Center (Rizhao)	12,000	5th
Shenzhen	(China) Zhang Xiaorui (caretaker)	Shenzhen	Centralised venues (Haikou/Jinjiang)	-	6th
Guangzhou City	(China) Li Weifeng	Guangzhou	Yuexiushan Stadium	18,000	7th
Hebei	(China) Liu Junwei (caretaker)	Langfang	Datong Sports Center (Datong)	29,284	8th
Shanghai Shenhua	(China) Wu Jingui	Shanghai	Jinzhou Stadium (Dalian)	30,776	9th
Henan Songshan Longmen	(Spain) Javier Pereira	Zhengzhou	Hanghai Stadium	29,860	10th
Cangzhou Mighty Lions	(Serbia) Svetozar Šapurić	Cangzhou	Centralised venues (Haikou/Dalian)	-	11th
Tianjin Jinmen Tiger	(China) Yu Genwei	Tianjin	Centralised venues (Haikou)	-	12th
Wuhan Yangtze River	(China) Li Jinyu	Wuhan	Wuhan Five Rings Sports Center	30,000	14th
Wuhan Three Towns ^{P}	(Spain) Pedro Morilla	Wuhan	Wuhan Sports Center	56,201	CL1, 1st
Meizhou Hakka ^{P}	(Serbia) Milan Ristić	Wuhua	Wuhua County Olympic Sports Centre	27,000	CL1, 2nd
Zhejiang ^{P}	(Spain) Jordi Vinyals	Hangzhou	Huzhou Olympic Sports Centre (Huzhou)	40,000	CL1, 3rd (Promotion play-offs winner)
Chengdu Rongcheng ^{P}	(South Korea) Seo Jung-won	Chengdu	Shuangliu Sports Centre	26,000	CL1, 4th (Promotion play-offs winner)
Chengdu Rongcheng ^{P}	(South Korea) Seo Jung-won	Chengdu	Phoenix Hill Football Stadium	50,695	CL1, 4th (Promotion play-offs winner)
Dalian Pro	(China) Xie Hui	Dalian	Puwan Stadium	30,000	15th (Relegation play-offs loser)
Dalian Pro	(China) Xie Hui	Dalian	Dalian Sports Centre Stadium	60,832	15th (Relegation play-offs loser)

- Guangzhou (Rounds 16, 23, 24); Chengdu Rongcheng (Rounds 17, 19, 27, 28, 30); Henan Songshan Longmen (Round 19); Zhejiang (Round 23); Shandong Taishan (Round 29); Beijing Guoan (Round 31), played in centralised venues (Haikou or Jinjiang), Guangzhou City (Round 25) played in away venues (Wuhua).

=== Managerial changes ===
Team	Outgoing manager	Manner of departure	Date of vacancy	Position in table	Incoming manager	Date of appointment
Beijing Guoan	(Croatia) Slaven Bilić	Mutual consent	8 January 2022	Pre-season	(China) Xie Feng	14 January 2022
Guangzhou	(China) Zheng Zhi	Mutual consent		Pre-season	(China) Liu Zhiyu	
Henan Songshan Longmen	(Spain) Antonio Gómez-Carreño Escalona (caretaker)	End of caretaker spell	9 January 2022	Pre-season	(Spain) Javier Pereira	9 January 2022
Shenzhen	(China) Zhang Xiaorui (caretaker)	End of caretaker spell	12 February 2022	Pre-season	(South Korea) Lee Jang-soo	12 February 2022
Shanghai Shenhua	(China) Mao Yijun (caretaker)	End of caretaker spell	1 March 2022	Pre-season	(China) Wu Jingui	1 March 2022
Dalian Pro	(Spain) José González	Mutual consent	12 March 2022	Pre-season	(China) Xie Hui	19 March 2022
Guangzhou City	(Netherlands) Jean-Paul van Gastel	Mutual consent	24 July 2022	17th	(China) Zhao Junzhe (caretaker)	24 July 2022
Beijing Guoan	(China) Xie Feng	Resigned	12 August 2022	11th	(China) Sui Dongliang (caretaker)	12 August 2022
Guangzhou	(China) Liu Zhiyu	Mutual consent	13 August 2022	16th	(China) Zheng Zhi	13 August 2022
Beijing Guoan	(China) Sui Dongliang (caretaker)	End of caretaker spell	29 August 2022	9th	(Netherlands) Stanley Menzo	29 August 2022
Guangzhou City	(China) Zhao Junzhe (caretaker)	End of caretaker spell	29 August 2022	17th	(China) Li Weifeng	29 August 2022
Shenzhen	(South Korea) Lee Jang-soo	Sacked	1 September 2022	13th	(China) Zhang Xiaorui (caretaker)	1 September 2022
Shanghai Port	(Croatia) Ivan Leko	Sacked	1 December 2022	6th	(China) Xi Zhikang (caretaker)	1 December 2022
Hebei	(South Korea) Kim Jong-boo	End of visa	16 December 2022	18th	(China) Chen Jieqiong (caretaker)	16 December 2022
Hebei	(China) Chen Jieqiong (caretaker)	End of caretaker spell	23 December 2022	18th	(China) Liu Junwei (caretaker)	23 December 2022

=== Foreign players ===
- Players name in **bold** indicates the player is registered during the mid-season transfer window.
- Players name in ITALICS indicates the players that left their respective clubs during the mid-season transfer window

Team	Player 1	Player 2	Player 3	Player 4	Player 5	Naturalized players	Hong Kong/Macau/ Taiwan Players^{1}	Reserves players	Former players
Beijing Guoan	(Bosnia and Herzegovina) Samir Memišević	(Croatia) Marko Dabro	(Nigeria) Samuel Adegbenro	(South Korea) Kang Sang-woo		(England) → (China) Nico Yennaris^{2} (Norway) → (China) John Hou Sæter^{2}			
Cangzhou Mighty Lions	(Democratic Republic of the Congo) Oscar Maritu	(Guinea) **José Kanté**	(Kazakhstan) **Georgy Zhukov**	(Netherlands) **Deabeas Owusu-Sekyere**	(Zambia) Stoppila Sunzu				(Serbia) Stefan Mihajlović
Changchun Yatai	(Austria) **Peter Žulj**	(Brazil) Erik	(Brazil) Júnior Negrão	(Brazil) Serginho	(Denmark) Jores Okore				(South Africa) Dino Ndlovu
Chengdu Rongcheng	(Austria) Richard Windbichler	(Brazil) Felipe	(Brazil) **Matheus Saldanha**	(Brazil) Rômulo	(South Korea) Kim Min-woo		(Chinese Taipei) Tim Chow		(Brazil) Johnathan Goiano
Dalian Pro	(Bulgaria) **Borislav Tsonev**	(Central African Republic) **Lobi Manzoki**	(Germany) **Streli Mamba**	(Serbia) **Nemanja Bosančić**			(Hong Kong) **Vas Nuñez**		
Guangzhou									(England) → (China) Tyias Browning
Guangzhou City	(Brazil) Guilherme	(Colombia) Jown Cardona				(United States) → (China) Sun Delin^{2}	(Hong Kong) Tan Chun Lok		
Hebei									
Henan Songshan Longmen	(Argentina) **Guido Carrillo**	(Bosnia and Herzegovina) Toni Šunjić	(Brazil) Fernando Karanga	(Poland) Adrian Mierzejewski	(Spain) **Tomás Pina**				(Brazil) Henrique Dourado (Sierra Leone) Mohamed Buya Turay
Meizhou Hakka	(Brazil) Rodrigo Henrique	(Montenegro) Nebojša Kosović	(Nigeria) Chisom Egbuchulam	(Serbia) Aleksa Vukanović	(Serbia) Rade Dugalić		(Hong Kong) **Yue Tze Nam**		(Hong Kong) Vas Nuñez
Shandong Taishan	(Belgium) Marouane Fellaini	(Brazil) Cryzan	(Brazil) Jadson	(Brazil) Moisés	(South Korea) Son Jun-ho				
Shanghai Port	(Argentina) **Matías Vargas**	(Brazil) Oscar	(Brazil) Paulinho	(Senegal) Cherif Ndiaye	(Sierra Leone) **Issa Kallon**	(England) → (China) **Tyias Browning**^{2}			(Australia) Aaron Mooy
Shanghai Shenhua	(Cameroon) Christian Bassogog	(Ecuador) Miller Bolaños				(Gabon) → (China) Alexander N'Doumbou^{2} (Italy) → (China) Denny Wang^{2}			
Shenzhen	(France) Romain Alessandrini	(Ghana) Frank Acheampong	(South Korea) Lim Chai-min			(Hong Kong) → (China) Dai Wai Tsun	(Chinese Taipei) **Will Donkin**		(Ghana) Mubarak Wakaso
Tianjin Jinmen Tiger	(Brazil) Éder Lima	(Brazil) Farley Rosa	(Slovenia) Robert Berić	(Spain) David Andújar	(Spain) **Fran Mérida**				(Croatia) Dejan Radonjić
Wuhan Three Towns	(Brazil) Ademilson	(Brazil) Davidson	(Brazil) Marcão	(Brazil) Wallace	(Romania) Nicolae Stanciu		(Chinese Taipei) Yaki Yen		
Wuhan Yangtze River	(Brazil) Bruno Viana	(Costa Rica) Felicio Brown Forbes	(Martinique) Yoann Arquin	(Montenegro) Asmir Kajević					
Zhejiang	(Brazil) Lucas Possignolo	(Brazil) Matheus	(Cameroon) Donovan Ewolo	(Croatia) Franko Andrijašević	(Zimbabwe) Nyasha Mushekwi		(Hong Kong) Leung Nok Hang		

- **^1** For Hong Kong, Macau, or Taiwanese players, if they are non-naturalized and were registered as professional footballers in Hong Kong's, Macau's, or Chinese Taipei's football association for the first time, they are recognized as native players. Otherwise they are recognized as foreign players.
- **^2** Naturalized players whose parents or grandparents were born in mainland China, thus are regarded as local players.

== League table ==
Pos	Team	Pld	W	D	L	GF	GA	GD	Pts	Qualification or relegation
1	Wuhan Three Towns (C, Q)	34	25	3	6	91	28	+63	78 (Note: Wuhan Three Towns finished ahead of Shandong Taishan on goal difference.)	Qualification for AFC Champions League group stage
2	Shandong Taishan (Q)	34	25	3	6	87	29	+58	78	Qualification for AFC Champions League group stage (Note: As Chinese FA Cup winners.)
3	Zhejiang (Q)	34	18	11	5	64	28	+36	65 (Note: Zhejiang finished ahead of Shanghai Port and Chengdu Rongcheng on head-to-head points and Shanghai Port finished ahead of Chengdu Rongcheng on head-to-head points: Zhejiang 2–1 Shanghai Port, Shanghai Port 1–1 Zhejiang, Zhejiang 1–1 Chengdu Rongcheng, Chengdu Rongcheng 1–1 Zhejiang, Shanghai Port 3–0 Chengdu Rongcheng, Chengdu Rongcheng 0–0 Shanghai Port.)	Qualification for AFC Champions League play-off round
4	Shanghai Port (Q)	34	20	5	9	55	25	+30	65	Qualification for AFC Champions League play-off round
5	Chengdu Rongcheng	34	18	11	5	49	28	+21	65	
6	Henan Songshan Longmen	34	17	8	9	60	32	+28	59	
7	Beijing Guoan	34	17	7	10	57	49	+8	58	
8	Tianjin Jinmen Tiger	34	14	7	13	45	42	+3	49 (Note: Tianjin Jinmen Tiger finished ahead of Meizhou Hakka on head-to-head points: Tianjin Jinmen Tiger 1–0 Meizhou Hakka, Meizhou Hakka 1–1 Tianjin Jinmen Tiger.)	
9	Meizhou Hakka	34	14	7	13	43	41	+2	49	
10	Shanghai Shenhua (Note: Shanghai Shenhua had 6 points deducted due to unpaid salaries on 23 November 2022.)	34	14	11	9	42	34	+8	47	
11	Dalian Pro (Note: After Dalian Pro had defeated Guangzhou City 2–0, Chinese Football Association awarded Guangzhou City a 3–0 win as a result of Dalian Pro failing to field at least one U-23 player on the field when Dalian Pro substituted off Huang Jiahui, their only U-23 player on the field, at the 67th minute for non U-23 player Wu Wei and substituted on two U-23 players at the 69th minute.)	34	12	9	13	49	53	−4	45	
12	Cangzhou Mighty Lions	34	11	11	12	47	51	−4	44 (Note: Cangzhou Mighty Lions finished ahead of Changchun Yatai on head-to-head goal difference: Cangzhou Mighty Lions 1–2 Changchun Yatai, Changchun Yatai 0–2 Cangzhou Mighty Lions.)	
13	Changchun Yatai	34	11	11	12	49	50	−1	44	
14	Shenzhen	34	9	3	22	29	74	−45	30	
15	Guangzhou City (D)	34	6	5	23	32	62	−30	23	Dissolved
16	Wuhan Yangtze River (Note: Wuhan Yangtze River had 3 points deducted due to unpaid salaries on 5 November 2022 and had 6 points deducted due to unpaid salaries on 23 November 2022.) (D, R)	34	8	4	22	34	71	−37	19	Dissolved
17	Guangzhou (R)	34	3	8	23	24	63	−39	17	Relegation to League One
18	Hebei (Note: Hebei had 3 points deducted due to unpaid salaries on 5 November 2022 and had 6 points deducted due to unpaid salaries on 23 November 2022.) (D, R)	34	2	0	32	18	115	−97	−3	Dissolved

Source: Soccerway
Rules for classification:
- During season: 1) Points; 2) Goal difference; 3) Goals scored.
- After season: 1) Points; 2) Head-to-head points; 3) Head-to-head goal difference; 4) Head-to-head goals scored; 5) Scores of the weight ratio of the reserve league and youth leagues.
  (C) Champions; (D) Disqualified; (Q) Qualified for the phase indicated; (R) Relegated
  Notes:

== Results ==
Home \ Away	BJG	CML	CCY	CDR	DLP	GZH	GZC	HEB	HSL	MZH	SDT	SHP	SHS	SZH	TJT	WTT	WYR	ZHJ
Beijing Guoan	—	1–2	3–0	0–0	1–3	4–1	1–0	3–1	2–1	0–0	3–3	0–3; Awarded	0–2	4–1	1–0	0–2	3–1	2–2
Cangzhou Mighty Lions	1–1	—	1–2	0–0	1–1	2–0	0–0	3–0; Awarded	1–1	1–1	0–2	0–0	0–3	1–2	0–2	0–4	1–0	1–1
Changchun Yatai	0–1	0–2	—	0–1	1–1	0–0	4–1	4–1	0–0	1–0	1–2	1–4	0–0	1–0	2–3	1–2	2–0	1–1
Chengdu Rongcheng	2–3	1–1	2–2	—	3–0	2–0	3–0	6–0	0–0	0–0	2–1	0–0	3–2	2–2	2–1	1–0	3–1	1–1
Dalian Pro	2–2	2–0	2–2	2–0	—	1–1	0–3; Awarded	2–1	0–2	2–1	1–3	1–1	1–2	5–1	0–2	1–2	2–1	1–1
Guangzhou	1–3	3–3	1–4	1–2	0–0	—	0–0	1–0	1–1	1–3	2–4	0–1	0–1	4–1	0–0	1–2	0–1	1–5
Guangzhou City	1–2	1–4	1–3	1–2	0–3	1–0	—	4–1	0–3	0–1	0–1	1–2	1–1	1–1	2–0	0–3	0–5	2–4
Hebei	0–4	0–5	1–7	0–1	1–4	0–1	0–4	—	0–4	0–4	0–7	0–2	1–3	2–0	3–4	0–4	2–1	1–6
Henan Songshan Longmen	3–0	3–0	6–2	0–1	2–2	2–1	2–1	1–0	—	0–1	4–1	1–2	1–1	3–0; Awarded	0–1	0–3	3–0	3–1
Meizhou Hakka	2–2	4–1	1–0	1–2	4–2	1–0	2–1	6–0	3–2	—	1–2	0–1	0–1	1–0	1–1	1–2	2–1	0–0
Shandong Taishan	3–0; Awarded	2–3	4–0	2–1	3–0	3–0	2–0	4–0	2–0	3–0; Awarded	—	3–1	2–0	8–0	4–1	1–1	5–0	1–0
Shanghai Port	0–1	2–0	4–0	3–0	2–1	1–0	2–0	2–1	1–3	7–0	2–0	—	1–1	2–0	1–0	0–1	0–1	1–1
Shanghai Shenhua	1–2	1–2	0–0	0–2	1–2	2–1	1–1	1–0	1–0	1–0	2–1	2–0	—	2–0	1–1	1–1	2–0	0–2
Shenzhen	2–1	1–0	0–2	2–0	0–2	2–1	0–3	2–1	0–2	1–2	0–4	0–3	0–0	—	2–3	0–4	1–2	0–2
Tianjin Jinmen Tiger	1–2	3–0	2–2	1–1	0–3; Awarded	0–0	1–0	5–0	1–1	1–0	0–1	1–0	2–1	1–2	—	0–1	3–1	1–2
Wuhan Three Towns	5–1	3–4	2–3	0–1	4–0	6–0	4–1	5–0	1–3	3–0	1–1	2–1	4–2	5–1	3–0; Awarded	—	5–0	2–0
Wuhan Yangtze River	1–4	1–4	1–1	0–1	3–0	2–1	2–1	2–1	2–2	0–0	1–2	1–2	2–2	0–3	0–3	1–3	—	0–3
Zhejiang	2–0	3–3	0–0	1–1	2–0	3–0	2–0	3–0	0–1	2–0	2–0	2–1	1–1	0–2	3–0; Awarded	2–1	4–0	—

Source: Soccerway
Legend: Blue = home team win; Yellow = draw; Red = away team win.
For upcoming matches, an "a" indicates there is an article about the rivalry between the two participants.

== Positions by round ==
To preserve chronological evolvements, any postponed matches are not included to the round at which they were originally scheduled, but added to the full round they were played immediately afterwards. For example, if a match is scheduled for round 7, but then played between rounds 8 and 9, it will be added to the standings for round 8.

Team ╲ Round	1	2	3	4	5	6	7	8	9	10	11	12	13	14	15	16	17	18	19	20	21	22	23	24	25	26	27	28	29	30	31	32	33	34
Wuhan Three Towns	1	1	2	1	1	1	1	1	1	1	1	1	1	1	1	1	1	1	1	1	1	1	1	1	2	1	1	1	1	1	1	1	1	1
Shandong Taishan	5	10	7	4	3	4	3	2	2	2	2	2	2	2	2	2	2	2	2	2	2	2	2	2	1	2	2	2	2	2	2	2	2	2
Zhejiang	15	13	15	15	13	10	11	12	9	8	5	6	9	9	6	5	6	7	5	5	6	6	7	4	4	5	3	3	3	3	3	3	3	3
Shanghai Port	14	15	12	10	11	8	9	7	6	6	7	9	7	7	8	8	8	4	4	4	4	5	3	3	3	3	4	6	5	5	4	4	4	4
Chengdu Rongcheng	16	14	14	14	15	15	15	15	13	12	10	7	6	8	5	6	7	8	7	9	9	8	8	8	7	7	6	4	4	4	5	5	5	5
Henan Songshan Longmen	9	5	3	2	4	3	4	3	3	3	3	3	3	3	3	3	3	5	6	6	5	4	5	6	5	4	7	5	6	7	7	7	7	6
Beijing Guoan	12	9	6	7	5	5	5	5	5	5	8	12	8	6	9	9	9	9	9	8	7	7	6	7	6	6	5	7	7	6	6	6	6	7
Tianjin Jinmen Tiger	11	12	13	13	12	11	6	10	12	9	11	8	10	10	11	11	10	11	11	10	10	10	11	10	10	9	8	8	8	8	8	8	8	8
Meizhou Hakka	10	11	10	9	8	12	7	6	7	10	6	5	4	4	7	7	5	6	8	7	8	9	9	9	9	8	9	9	9	9	9	9	9	9
Shanghai Shenhua	6	3	4	3	2	2	2	4	4	4	4	4	5	5	4	4	4	3	3	3	3	3	4	5	8	10	10	10	10	12	12	10	11	10
Dalian Pro	8	7	9	8	9	14	12	13	15	14	15	15	15	14	14	14	14	12	14	13	14	13	14	12	12	12	12	12	11	10	10	11	10	11
Cangzhou Mighty Lions	4	8	11	11	14	13	14	14	14	15	14	14	14	15	15	15	15	14	12	12	13	12	13	14	13	14	13	13	13	13	13	13	13	12
Changchun Yatai	2	6	8	12	10	7	8	9	11	13	13	13	13	12	10	10	11	10	10	11	11	11	10	11	11	11	11	11	12	11	11	12	12	13
Shenzhen	3	2	5	5	6	6	10	11	8	7	9	10	11	13	13	13	13	13	13	14	12	14	12	13	14	13	14	14	14	14	14	14	14	14
Guangzhou City	17	16	16	17	18	17	18	17	17	17	18	18	17	17	17	17	17	17	17	17	17	16	16	16	16	15	16	17	17	17	15	15	15	15
Wuhan Yangtze River	7	4	1	6	7	9	13	8	10	11	12	11	12	11	12	12	12	15	15	15	15	15	15	15	15	17	17	15	15	16	17	16	16	16
Guangzhou	13	18	18	18	16	16	16	16	16	16	16	16	16	16	16	16	16	16	16	16	16	17	17	17	17	16	15	16	16	15	16	17	17	17
Hebei	18	17	17	16	17	18	17	18	18	18	17	17	18	18	18	18	18	18	18	18	18	18	18	18	18	18	18	18	18	18	18	18	18	18

Leader and qualification to AFC Champions League group stage
Qualification to AFC Champions League play-off round
Relegation to League One

Source: Soccerway

== Player statistics ==
=== Top scorers ===
Rank	Player	Club	Goals
1	(Brazil) Marcão	Wuhan Three Towns	27
2	(Brazil) Cryzan	Shandong Taishan	25
3	(China) Zhang Yuning	Beijing Guoan	19
4	(Brazil) Davidson	Wuhan Three Towns	18
4	(Zimbabwe) Nyasha Mushekwi	Zhejiang	18
6	(Guinea) José Kanté	Cangzhou Mighty Lions	14
7	(Brazil) Moisés	Shandong Taishan	13
7	(China) Lin Liangming	Dalian Pro	13
7	(Croatia) Franko Andrijašević	Zhejiang	13
10	(Brazil) Rômulo	Chengdu Rongcheng	12
10	(Costa Rica) Felicio Brown Forbes	Wuhan Yangtze River	12

=== Top assists ===
Rank	Player	Club	Assists
1	(Brazil) Moisés	Shandong Taishan	16
2	(Brazil) Davidson	Wuhan Three Towns	13
3	(Romania) Nicolae Stanciu	Wuhan Three Towns	12
4	(Brazil) Erik	Changchun Yatai	9
4	(China) Xie Pengfei	Wuhan Three Towns	9
4	(China) Yan Xiangchuang	Dalian Pro	9
7	(China) Zhang Xizhe	Beijing Guoan	8
7	(Democratic Republic of the Congo) Oscar Maritu	Cangzhou Mighty Lions	8
7	(Montenegro) Nebojša Kosović	Meizhou Hakka	8
10	(South Korea) Kang Sang-woo	Beijing Guoan	7

=== Hat-tricks ===
Player	Club	Against	Result	Date	Source
(China) Tan Long	Changchun Yatai	Guangzhou City	4–1 (H)	4 June 2022	
(Brazil) Marcão	Wuhan Three Towns	Shanghai Shenhua	4–2 (H)	3 July 2022	
(Brazil) Marcão^{4}	Wuhan Three Towns	Beijing Guoan	5–1 (H)	12 August 2022	
(Costa Rica) Felicio Brown Forbes	Wuhan Yangtze River	Guangzhou City	0–5 (A)	13 August 2022	
(Brazil) Júnior Negrão	Changchun Yatai	Hebei	1–7 (A)	19 August 2022	
(Guinea) José Kanté^{4}	Cangzhou Mighty Lions	Wuhan Three Towns	3–4 (A)	24 September 2022	
(China) Zang Yifeng	Cangzhou Mighty Lions	Hebei	0–5 (A)	4 October 2022	
(China) Wu Lei	Shanghai Port	Meizhou Hakka	7–0 (H)	24 October 2022	
(Brazil) Rômulo	Chengdu Rongcheng	Hebei	6–0 (H)	3 November 2022	
(Guinea) José Kanté	Cangzhou Mighty Lions	Shandong Taishan	2–3 (A)	30 November 2022	
(Nigeria) Chisom Egbuchulam	Meizhou Hakka	Hebei	0–4 (A)	5 December 2022	
(Brazil) Cryzan^{4}	Shandong Taishan	Shenzhen	8-0 (H)	19 December 2022	

Notes

- (H) – Home team
- (A) – Away team

== Awards ==
=== Annual awards ===
2022 China Football Golden Awards
Award	Winner	Club / Team
China Football Golden Ball Award	(China) Zhang Yuning	Beijing Guoan
China Football Golden Coach	(China) Shui Qingxia	China women's national football team
China Football Golden Boy	(China) Afrden Asqer	Guangzhou FC

Team of the Year
Goalkeeper	(China) Yan Junling (Shanghai Port)			
Defenders	(China) Zheng Zheng (Shandong Taishan)		(Brazil) Moisés (Shandong Taishan)	(Serbia) Dragoljub Srnić (Meizhou Hakka)
Midfielders	(Romania) Nicolae Stanciu (Wuhan Three Towns)	(Brazil) Rômulo (Chengdu Rongcheng)	(China) Xie Pengfei (Wuhan Three Towns)	(Brazil) Davidson (Wuhan Three Towns)
Forwards	(Mozambique) Clesio (Shandong Taishan)		(China) Zhang Yuning (Beijing Guoan)	(Brazil) Marcão (Wuhan Three Towns)
