= Huang Jiahui =

Chinese association football player

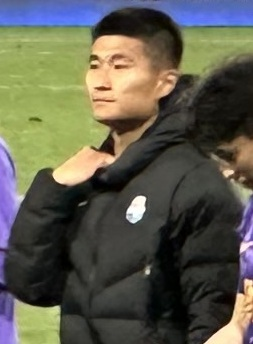
- Huang Jiahui in April 2025

Personal information
- Date of birth: 7 October 2000 (age 26)
- Place of birth: Shanghai, China
- Height: 1.83 m (6 ft 0 in)
- Positions: Midfielder; defender

Team information
- Current team: Tianjin Jinmen Tiger
- Number: 14

Youth career
- 2012–2015: Valencia
- 2015–2019: Dalian Pro

Senior career*
Years	Team	Apps	(Gls)
2019–2023	Dalian Pro	65	(1)
2024–	Tianjin Jinmen Tiger	81	(1)

International career^{‡}
2019	China U20	1	(0)
2022–2023	China U23	13	(0)
2022–	China	12	(0)
Medal record
Representing China
Men's football
EAFF Championship
Bronze medal – third place	2022 Japan	Team
- * Club domestic league appearances and goals as of 22 November 2026 ‡ National team caps and goals as of 22 June 2024

Huang Jiahui (simplified Chinese: 黄嘉辉; traditional Chinese: 黃嘉輝; pinyin: Huáng Jiāhuī; born 7 October 2000) is a Chinese professional footballer who plays as a midfielder or defender for Tianjin Jinmen Tiger and the China national team.

== Club career ==
Born in Shanghai, Huang was invited to join the academy of Spanish side Valencia, as part of the Wanda Group initiative to bring young Chinese players to Spanish clubs. On his return he would join Wanda Group owned Dalian Pro and be promoted to their senior within the 2019 Chinese Super League season. He would make his debut in a league game on 15 June 2019 against Hebei China Fortune F.C. in a 1–0 defeat where he came on as a late substitute for Zhou Ting. On 19 July 2021, he scored his first career goal in a 3–2 defeat against Shanghai Shenhua.

He would go on to establish himself as a regular member of the team due to the Chinese Super League rules requesting every team to field at least one player under 23 years old at any point of the game. On 8 June 2022, when Dalian won their second league game of the season 2–0 against Guangzhou City it was overturned to a 3–0 defeat. The reason being that Huang was the team's only designated U-23 player on the pitch, when he was taken off at the 68th minute due to an injury he was substituted by non-U-23 player Wu Wei, and the game went back to play. Despite subsequently rectifying this mistake and bringing on two U-23 players after 47 seconds, they were penalized for that 47-second gap and Guangzhou city was awarded a 3–0 win.

== International career ==
On 20 July 2022, Huang made his international debut in a 3–0 defeat against South Korea in the 2022 EAFF E-1 Football Championship, as the Chinese FA decided to field the U-23 national team for this senior competition.

== Personal life ==
Huang is the brother of China women's under-17 player Huang Jiaxin.

== Career statistics ==
As of 31 December 2025.

Appearances and goals by club, season and competition
Club	Season	League			National Cup		Continental		Other		Total	
Club	Season	Division	Apps	Goals	Apps	Goals	Apps	Goals	Apps	Goals	Apps	Goals
Dalian Pro	2019	Chinese Super League	1	0	0	0	–		–		1	0
Dalian Pro	2020	Chinese Super League	4	0	1	0	–		–		5	0
Dalian Pro	2021	Chinese Super League	11	1	4	0	–		2 (Note: Appearance(s) in Promotion/Relegation Play-offs)	0	17	1
Dalian Pro	2022	Chinese Super League	30	0	0	0	–		–		30	0
Dalian Pro	2023	Chinese Super League	19	0	3	0	–		–		22	0
Dalian Pro	Total		65	1	8	0	0	0	2	0	75	1
Tianjin Jinmen Tiger	2024	Chinese Super League	27	0	3	0	–		–		30	0
Tianjin Jinmen Tiger	2025	Chinese Super League	27	0	1	0	–		–		28	0
Tianjin Jinmen Tiger	Total		54	0	4	0	0	0	0	0	58	0
Career total			119	1	12	0	0	0	2	0	133	1
