= Zhang Jiansheng =

Chinese association football player

Personal information
- Date of birth: 30 December 1999 (age 26)
- Place of birth: Xingtai, Hebei, China
- Height: 1.75 m (5 ft 9 in)
- Positions: Midfielder; forward

Team information
- Current team: Suzhou Dongwu
- Number: 24

Senior career*
Years	Team	Apps	(Gls)
2019–2023	Dalian Pro	0	(0)
2019	→ Meizhou Hakka (loan)	21	(1)
2021	→ Beijing BSU (loan)	17	(2)
2022	→ Shaanxi Chang'an Athletic (loan)	19	(0)
2023	→ Shanghai Jiading Huilong (loan)	24	(0)
2024–2025	Jiangxi Dingnan United	47	(3)
2026–	Suzhou Dongwu	0	(0)

International career^{‡}
2019	China U19	1	(0)
- * Club domestic league appearances and goals as of 23:06, 8 March 2026 (UTC) ‡ National team caps and goals as of 14:01, 24 August 2021 (UTC)

Zhang Jiansheng (Chinese: 张建生; born 30 December 1999) is a Chinese footballer currently playing as a midfielder or forward for China League One club Suzhou Dongwu.

== Club career ==
Zhang Jiansheng would play for the Dalian Yifang (now known as Dalian Professional youth team. He would go on to be loaned out to second tier club Meizhou Hakka on 1 February 2019. Zhang would go on to make his senior debut in a league game on 30 March 2019 against Guizhou Hengfeng in a 1-0 defeat. This would be followed by his first goal, which was in a league game on 29 June 2019 against Shanghai Shenxin in a 7-1 victory.

Zhang would return to Dalian for the 2020 Chinese Super League season, however he would not make any appearances for them during the campaign. The following season on 8 July 2021 he would be loaned out to second tier club Beijing BSU. On 9 August 2022, he would loaned out again to Shaanxi Chang'an Athletic during the 2022 China League One campaign.

== Career statistics ==
As of 31 December 2022.

Club	Season	League			Cup		Continental		Other		Total	
Club	Season	Division	Apps	Goals	Apps	Goals	Apps	Goals	Apps	Goals	Apps	Goals
Dalian Pro	2019	Chinese Super League	0	0	0	0	-		-		0	0
Dalian Pro	2020	Chinese Super League	0	0	0	0	-		-		0	0
Dalian Pro	2021	Chinese Super League	0	0	0	0	-		0 (Note: Appearance(s) in Promotion/Relegation Play-offs)	0	0	0
Dalian Pro	2022	Chinese Super League	0	0	0	0	-		-		0	0
Dalian Pro	Total		0	0	0	0	0	0	0	0	0	0
Meizhou Hakka (loan)	2019	China League One	21	1	1	0	-		-		22	1
Beijing BSU (loan)	2021	China League One	17	2	2	0	-		-		19	2
Shaanxi Chang'an Athletic (loan)	2022	China League One	19	0	1	0	-		-		20	0
Career total			57	3	4	0	0	0	0	0	61	3
