= Tong Lei =

Chinese footballer

Tong Lei 童磊
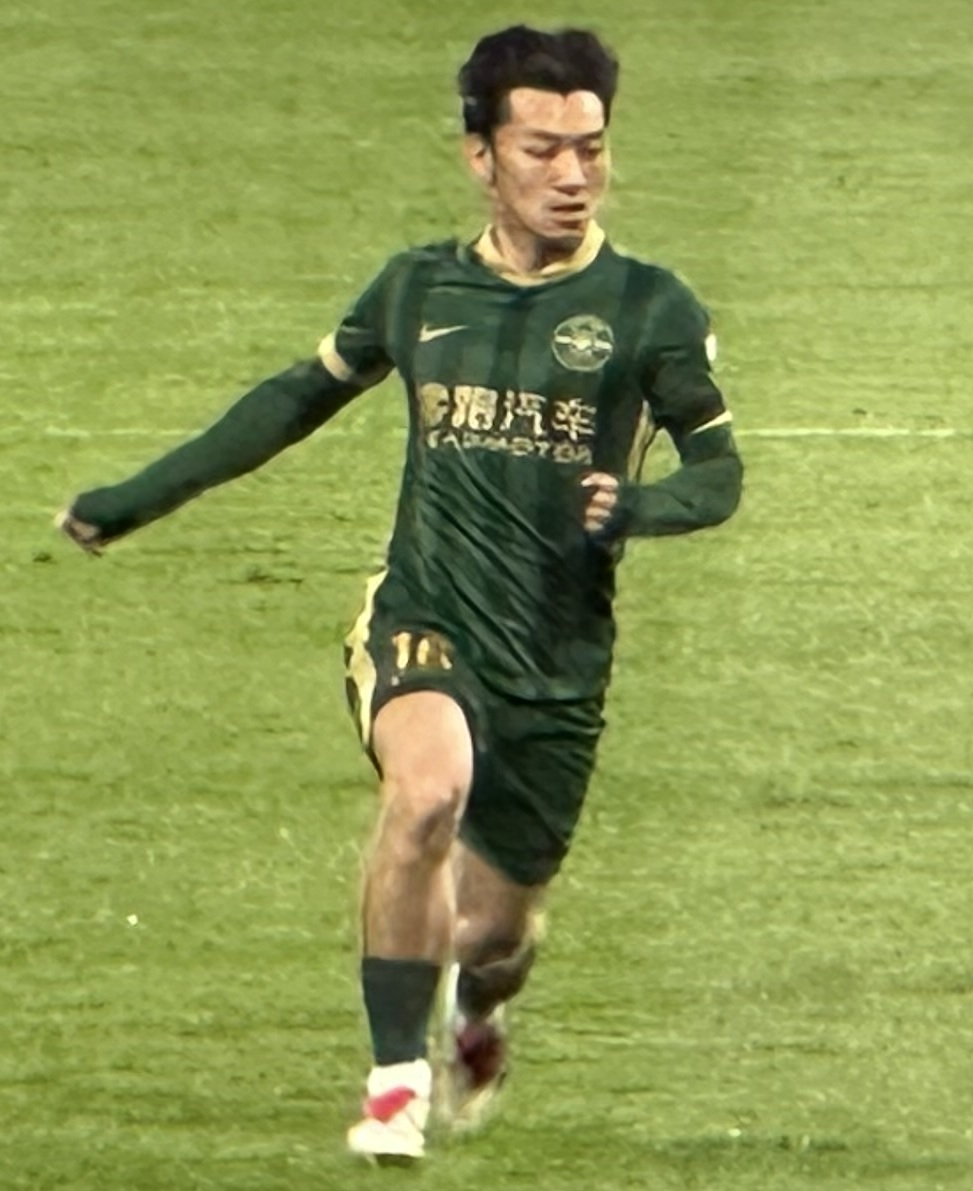
- Tong Lei in April 2025

Personal information
- Date of birth: 16 December 1997 (age 28)
- Place of birth: Quzhou, Zhejiang, China
- Height: 1.77 m (5 ft 10 in)
- Position: Right-back

Team information
- Current team: Zhejiang FC
- Number: 16

Youth career
- Hangzhou Greentown

Senior career*
Years	Team	Apps	(Gls)
2016–2019	Hangzhou Greentown	23	(0)
2020–2022	Dalian Professional	47	(0)
2023–2024	Shandong Taishan	25	(0)
2025–	Zhejiang Professional	50	(2)

International career^{‡}
2015–2016	China U-19	19	(0)
2018–2020	China U-23	13	(0)
- * Club domestic league appearances and goals as of 19 November 2026 ‡ National team caps and goals as of 18 February 2019

Tong Lei (Chinese: 童磊; born 16 December 1997 in Quzhou) is a Chinese professional footballer who plays for Chinese Super League club Zhejiang Professional as a right-back.

== Club career ==
Tong Lei started his professional football career in 2016 when he was promoted to Hangzhou Greentown's first squad. On 15 May 2016, he made his debut for Hangzhou in the 2016 Chinese Super League against Liaoning Whowin, coming on as a substitute for Cheng Mouyi in the 74th minute. Despite the club facing relegation at the end of the season, Tong was given the opportunity to gain more playing time and he would gradually start to establish himself as a regular with the squad and was part of the team that narrowly missed out on promotion at the end of the 2019 China League One season.

On 7 February 2020 Tong joined top tier club Dalian Pro along with Wu Wei and Xue Qinghao on the same day. He would make his debut in a league game against Shandong Taishan on 26 July 2020 in a 3–2 defeat.

On 11 April 2023, Tong joined fellow Chinese Super League club Shandong Taishan. On 16 April 2023, he made his debut for Shandong in a 1–0 away defeat at Shanghai Shenhua.

On 16 February 2025, Tong returned to fellow Chinese Super League club Zhejiang Professional (formerly named Hangzhou Greentown). On 1 April 2025, Tong scored his first career goal in a 3-0 home win against Shenzhen Peng City.

== Career statistics ==
Statistics accurate as of match played 23 November 2024.

Appearances and goals by club, season and competition
Club	Season	League			National Cup		Continental		Other		Total	
Club	Season	Division	Apps	Goals	Apps	Goals	Apps	Goals	Apps	Goals	Apps	Goals
Hangzhou Greentown	2016	Chinese Super League	1	0	1	0	-		-		2	0
Hangzhou Greentown	2017	China League One	8	0	1	0	-		-		9	0
Hangzhou Greentown	2018	China League One	3	0	1	0	-		-		4	0
Hangzhou Greentown	2019	China League One	11	0	2	0	-		-		13	0
Hangzhou Greentown	Total		23	0	5	0	0	0	0	0	28	0
Dalian Professional	2020	Chinese Super League	19	0	0	0	-		-		19	0
Dalian Professional	2021	Chinese Super League	19	0	4	0	-		2 (Note: Appearance(s) in Relegation/Promotion Play-offs)	0	25	0
Dalian Professional	2022	Chinese Super League	9	0	0	0	-		-		9	0
Dalian Professional	Total		47	0	4	0	0	0	2	0	53	0
Shandong Taishan	2023	Chinese Super League	12	0	3	0	3	0	0	0	18	0
Shandong Taishan	2024	Chinese Super League	13	0	1	0	2	0	0	0	16	0
Shandong Taishan	Total		25	0	4	0	5	0	0	0	34	0
Career total			95	0	13	0	5	0	2	0	115	0
