= Asmir Kajević =

Montenegrin footballer

Personal information
- Full name: Asmir Kajević
- Date of birth: 15 February 1990 (age 36)
- Place of birth: Rožaje, SR Montenegro, SFR Yugoslavia
- Height: 1.87 m (6 ft 1 1/2 in)
- Position: Midfielder

Team information
- Current team: Dečić
- Number: 10

Youth career
- 1999–2007: Ibar Rožaje
- 2007–2008: BSK Borča

Senior career*
Years	Team	Apps	(Gls)
2008–2012	BSK Borča	70	(9)
2012–2015	FC Zürich	37	(2)
2016	Rijeka	0	(0)
2016–2022	Čukarički	151	(31)
2022	Wuhan Yangtze River	27	(4)
2023–2024	Vojvodina	10	(1)
2024–	Dečić	54	(11)

International career^{‡}
2007–2009	Montenegro U19	8	(1)
2010–2012	Montenegro U21	13	(2)
2018	Montenegro	2	(0)
- * Club domestic league appearances and goals as of 17 June 2026 ‡ National team caps and goals as of 8 June 2018

Asmir Kajević (Serbian Cyrillic: Асмир Кајевић; born 15 February 1990) is a Montenegrin professional footballer who plays as a midfielder for Dečić.

== Club career ==
Born in Rožaje, he made his debut as senior for BSK Borča during the 2008–09 Serbian First League and helped the club to win the league and be promoted to the 2009–10 Serbian SuperLiga. In his first top league season, he made 21 league appearances with 2 goals, becoming, along his countryman Stefan Savić, one of the most influential players in the club. These good displays didn't pass unnoticed in Montenegro, and both became regular members of the Montenegrin U19 team. The following season, 2010-11, followed the tendency with Kajević making further 26 league appearances with 3 goals.

On 19 January 2012, Kajević joined the Swiss team FC Zürich, where he played for four years. On 22 December 2015, HNK Rijeka announced that they have signed Kajević. Although he featured prominently in Rijeka's pre-season friendlies in January and February 2016, he missed the entire half-season due to injury. In June 2016, after Rijeka did not extend his contract, Kajević signed for FK Čukarički as free agent.

On 28 April 2022, Kajević joined Chinese Super League club Wuhan Yangtze River.

On 14 June 2023, Kajević signed for Vojvodina, until 2025.

== International career ==
After playing with the Montenegrin U19 team, he became a regular member of the Montenegro national under-21 football team since 2010. He was also part of the Montenegrin squad at the 2009 Mediterranean Games.

He made his senior international debut for the Montenegro on 28 May 2018 against Bosnia and has earned a total of 2 caps, scoring no goals. His second and final international appearance was June 2018 friendly match against Slovenia.

== Career statistics ==
As of 12 May 2024

Appearances and goals by club, season and competition
Club	Season	League			National Cup		Continental		Other		Total	
Club	Season	Division	Apps	Goals	Apps	Goals	Apps	Goals	Apps	Goals	Apps	Goals
BSK Borča	2008–09	Serbian First League	8	2			—		—		8	2
BSK Borča	2009–10	Serbian SuperLiga	21	2			—		—		21	2
BSK Borča	2010–11	Serbian SuperLiga	26	3			—		—		26	3
BSK Borča	2011–12	Serbian SuperLiga	15	2	1	0	—		—		16	2
BSK Borča	Total		70	9	1	0	0	0	0	0	71	9
FC Zürich	2011–12	Swiss Super League	7	1	0	0	—		—		7	1
FC Zürich	2012–13	Swiss Super League	6	0	1	1	—		—		7	1
FC Zürich	2013–14	Swiss Super League	8	0	3	1	0	0	—		11	1
FC Zürich	2014–15	Swiss Super League	16	1	3	0	1	0	—		20	1
FC Zürich	Total		37	2	7	2	1	0	0	0	45	4
Čukarički	2016–17	Serbian SuperLiga	25	5	4	1	3	2	—		32	8
Čukarički	2017–18	Serbian SuperLiga	25	5	4	1	—		—		29	6
Čukarički	2018–19	Serbian SuperLiga	26	6	2	0	—		—		28	6
Čukarički	2019–20	Serbian SuperLiga	25	2	3	0	1	1	—		29	3
Čukarički	2020–21	Serbian SuperLiga	26	6	1	1	—		—		26	7
Čukarički	2021–22	Serbian SuperLiga	24	7	1	0	3	0	—		28	7
Čukarički	Total		151	31	15	3	7	3	0	0	173	37
Wuhan Yangtze River	2022	Chinese Super League	27	4	0	0	—		—		27	4
Vojvodina	2023–24	Serbian SuperLiga	10	1	1	0	0	0	—		11	1
Career total			295	47	24	5	8	3	0	0	327	55

== Honours ==
BSK Borča

- Serbian First League: 2008–09

Individual

- Serbian SuperLiga Player of the Week: 2020–21 (Round 13)
