= César Lobi Manzoki =

Central African footballer

Personal information
- Full name: César Lobi Manzoki
- Date of birth: 12 October 1996 (age 30)
- Place of birth: Bunia, Zaire
- Height: 1.89 m (6 ft 2 in)
- Position: Striker

Senior career*
Years	Team	Apps	(Gls)
2012–2017	AS Dauphins Noirs		
2017–2018	AS Maniema Union		
2018–2020	AS Vita Club		
2020–2022	Vipers SC		
2022–2023	Dalian Pro	35	(10)
2024	Hatta Club	10	(0)
2024	Mohammedan	12	(1)
2025–2026	Eastern District	12	(1)
2026-	Vipers SC		

International career^{‡}
2016	DR Congo	3	(0)
2022–2023	Central African Republic	5	(0)
- * Club domestic league appearances and goals as of 16 May 2026 ‡ National team caps and goals as of 17 November 2023

César Lobi Manzoki (born 12 October 1996) is a professional footballer who currently plays as striker for Uganda Premier League club Vipers SC. Born in Zaire, he played for the Central African Republic national team.

== Club career ==
On 28 July 2020, Manzoki joined Vipers SC in the StarTimes Uganda Premier League where he played 46 games and scored 26 goals and provided 13 assists for the club. In the 2020–21 season, he won the Stanbic Uganda Cup Golden Boot, scoring 7 goals and he also won the league Golden Boot with 18 goals in the following season. He won the Pilsner player of the month 4 times and was included in the Uganda Premier League team of the season in 2021–22. He won 1 Uganda Cup and Uganda Premier League with Vipers SC.

On 25 August 2022, Manzoki signed for Dalian Pro before moving to UAE Pro League club Hatta.

In June 2024, Manzoki signed with Indian Super League side Mohammedan Sporting.

On 11 September 2025, Manzoki joined Hong Kong Premier League club Eastern District.

== International career ==
Manzoki represented the DR Congo national team in three matches in 2016. He switched to represent the Central African Republic national team in 2022 due to his ancestors being from the country.
