= Wu Wei (footballer, born 1997) =

Chinese footballer

Wu Wei 吴伟
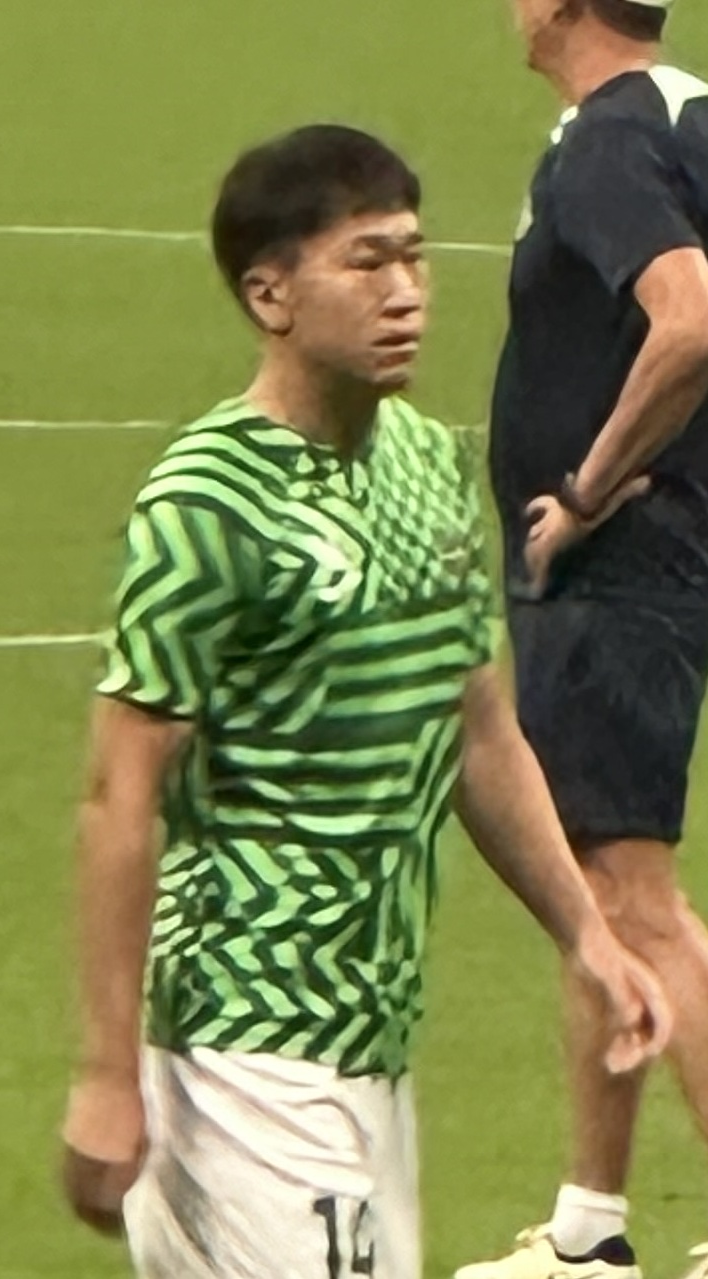
- Wu Wei in August 2024

Personal information
- Date of birth: 5 February 1997 (age 29)
- Place of birth: Xinxiang, Henan, China
- Height: 1.86 m (6 ft 1 in)
- Position: Midfielder

Team information
- Current team: Zhejiang FC
- Number: 14

Youth career
- 2010–2014: Hangzhou Greentown

Senior career*
Years	Team	Apps	(Gls)
2015–2017	Hangzhou Greentown	16	(0)
2018–2019	Tianjin Tianhai	38	(0)
2020–2023	Dalian Pro	53	(1)
2024–	Zhejiang FC	24	(0)

International career^{‡}
2011–2012	China U17	5	(0)
2015–2016	China U20	15	(1)
2018–2020	China U23	12	(2)
- * Club domestic league appearances and goals as of 19 November 2026 ‡ National team caps and goals as of 18 February 2019

Wu Wei (Chinese: 吴伟; pinyin: Wú Wěi; born 5 February 1997) is a Chinese professional footballer who plays as a midfielder for Zhejiang FC.

== Club career ==
Wu Wei was promoted to Hangzhou Greentown's first team squad in the summer of 2015, however he would have to wait until 12 March 2017 before he made his senior debut in a 3–2 home win against Nei Mongol Zhongyou in a league game. He would play in 16 league matches for the club at the end of the 2017 league season and would attract the interests of Chinese Super League side Tianjin Quanjian whom he transferred to on 28 February 2018. On 28 April 2018, he made his debut for the club in a 2–0 home loss to Hebei China Fortune, coming on as a substitute for Wang Yongpo in the 81st minute.

On 7 February 2020 Wu Wei joined fellow top tier club Dalian Professional along with Tong Lei on the same day. He would make his debut in a league game against Shandong Taishan F.C. on 26 July 2020 in a 3-2 defeat. The following season he would go on to score his first goal for the club in a Chinese FA Cup game on 18 October 2021, against Tianjin Jinmen Tiger F.C. in a 2-0 victory.

== Career statistics ==
As of match played 19 June 2026.

Appearances and goals by club, season and competition
Club	Season	League			National Cup		Continental		Other		Total	
Club	Season	Division	Apps	Goals	Apps	Goals	Apps	Goals	Apps	Goals	Apps	Goals
Hangzhou Greentown	2015	Chinese Super League	0	0	0	0	-		-		0	0
Hangzhou Greentown	2016	Chinese Super League	0	0	0	0	-		-		0	0
Hangzhou Greentown	2017	China League One	16	0	2	0	-		-		18	0
Hangzhou Greentown	Total		16	0	2	0	0	0	0	0	18	0
Tianjin Quanjian/ Tianjin Tianhai	2018	Chinese Super League	16	0	2	0	2 (Note: Appearance(s) in AFC Champions League)	0	-		20	0
Tianjin Quanjian/ Tianjin Tianhai	2019	Chinese Super League	22	0	1	0	-		-		23	0
Tianjin Quanjian/ Tianjin Tianhai	Total		38	0	3	0	2	0	0	0	43	0
Dalian Professional	2020	Chinese Super League	11	0	1	0	-		-		12	0
Dalian Professional	2021	Chinese Super League	17	0	3	1	-		0 (Note: Appearance(s) in Promotion/Relegation Play-offs)	0	20	1
Dalian Professional	2022	Chinese Super League	10	1	0	0	-		-		10	1
Dalian Professional	2023	Chinese Super League	15	0	0	0	-		-		15	0
Dalian Professional	Total		53	1	4	1	0	0	0	0	57	2
Zhejiang FC	2024	Chinese Super League	7	0	1	0	6 (Note: Appearance(s) in AFC Champions League Two)	0	-		14	0
Zhejiang FC	2025	Chinese Super League	1	0	1	0	-		-		2	0
Zhejiang FC	2026	Chinese Super League	10	0	1	1	-		-		11	1
Zhejiang FC	Total		18	0	3	1	6	0	0	0	27	1
Career total			125	1	12	2	8	0	0	0	145	3
