= Nemanja Bosančić =

Serbian footballer (born 1995)

Personal information
- Full name: Nemanja Bosančić
- Date of birth: 1 March 1995 (age 31)
- Place of birth: Pristina, FR Yugoslavia
- Height: 1.80 m (5 ft 11 in)
- Position: Midfielder

Team information
- Current team: Vardar
- Number: 88

Youth career
- –2014: Inđija

Senior career*
Years	Team	Apps	(Gls)
2014–2017	Inđija	81	(6)
2017–2018	Borac Čačak		
2018	Berane	6	(0)
2018–2020	Inđija	41	(2)
2020–2021	Kolubara	12	(1)
2021–2022	Struga	46	(10)
2022	Lahti	4	(0)
2022–2023	Dalian Pro	27	(0)
2024	Panevėžys	17	(0)
2024–	Vardar	50	(3)
- * Club domestic league appearances and goals as of 15 May 2026

Nemanja Bosančić (Serbian Cyrillic: Немања Бocaнчић; born 1 March 1995) is a Serbian professional footballer who plays as a midfielder for FK Vardar.

== Club career ==
=== Early career ===
Bosančić started his career at FK Inđija. In 2018, he shortly joined Montenegrin club FK Berane, then returned to Inđija. In 2020, he moved to FK Kolubara.

In 2021, he transferred to FC Struga, where he played in the UEFA Europa Conference League qualification round.

=== Outside the Balkans ===
In July 2022, Bosančić joined Finnish club FC Lahti. He played only 4 matches in the Finnish top-tier league Veikkausliiga before moving to the far east.

In August 2022, he signed with Chinese Super League side Dalian Professional for €100,000.

On 26 March 2024 lithuanian Panevėžys Club announced about new player.

== Career statistics ==
Statistics accurate as of match played 16 June 2024.

Club	Season	League			Cup		Continental		Other		Total	
Club	Season	Division	Apps	Goals	Apps	Goals	Apps	Goals	Apps	Goals	Apps	Goals
Inđija	2013–14	Serbian First League	6	0	0	0	-		-		6	0
Inđija	2014–15	Serbian First League	24	0	2	0	-		-		26	0
Inđija	2015–16	Serbian First League	24	1	1	0	-		-		25	1
Inđija	2016–17	Serbian First League	27	5	1	0	-		-		28	5
Inđija	Total		81	6	4	0	0	0	0	0	85	6
Berane	2017–18	Montenegrin Second League	6	0	0	0	-		-		6	0
Inđija	2018–19	Serbian First League	18	1	0	0	-		1	0	19	1
Inđija	2019–20	Serbian Super Liga	23	1	2	1	-		-		25	2
Inđija	Total		41	2	2	1	0	0	1	0	44	3
Kolubara	2020–21	Serbian Super Liga	12	1	1	0	-		-		13	1
Struga	2020–21	Macedonian First League	15	2	1	0	-		-		16	2
Struga	2021–22	Macedonian First League	31	8	1	0	2	0	-		34	8
Struga	Total		46	10	2	0	2	0	0	0	50	10
Lahti	2022	Veikkausliiga	4	0	0	0	-		-		4	0
Dalian Pro	2022	Chinese Super League	10	0	0	0	-		-		10	0
Dalian Pro	2023	Chinese Super League	17	0	1	0	-		-		18	0
Dalian Pro	Total		27	0	1	0	0	0	0	0	28	10
Panevėžys	2024	A Lyga	11	0	1	0	-		-		12	0
Career Total			228	19	11	1	2	0	1	0	252	20
