= Wuyuan River Stadium =

Building in Haikou, China

Coordinates: 20°01′42.2″N 110°12′27.2″E

- 五源河体育场
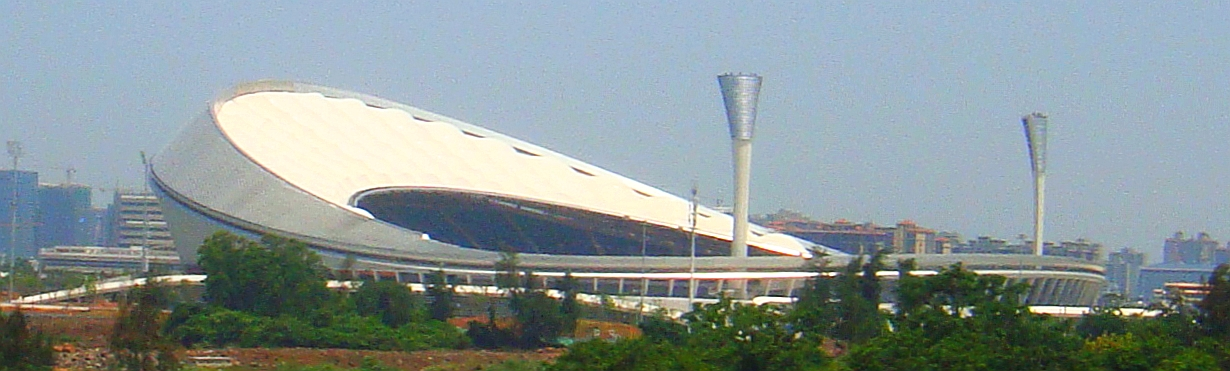
- Wuyuan River Stadium in May 2018
- Interactive map of Wuyuan River Stadium
- Location: Changbin Rd, Xiuying District, Haikou, Hainan, China
- Capacity: 41,506

Construction
- Groundbreaking: March 7, 2017
- Opened: April 28, 2018

The Wuyuan River Stadium (Chinese: 五源河体育场) is a stadium in Haikou's west coast area, Hainan, China. It is Hainan's largest stadium.

== History ==
Construction started March 7, 2017. It was scheduled for completion on April 28, 2018, and by June of that year, the stadium itself was almost entirely complete with the grounds still under construction. The total investment was 1.06 billion RMB.

In September 2024, the stadium was damaged by Typhoon Yagi. Fabric used to cover the structure was destroyed along part of the top rim and elsewhere.

== Location and access ==
The stadium is located just southeast of the newly built Haikou West Coast neighborhood. It is situated on the east side of Xiuying Chang Bin Road, just under 3 km southwest of Holiday Beach. A new, elevated east–west road was built in 2017 that connects Haikou West Coast and downtown Haikou. This road runs directly south of the stadium and has an exit for access.

== Description ==
The site covers 406 acres. The stadium itself is 60,000 square metres with an additional 20,500 square meters of area underground. It has a capacity of 41,506 people. The interior contains two lighting towers and two large televisions on each end. The west side is uncovered. The west side is covered, contains the VIP boxes and has seating that extends higher than the rows on the east side. The seats are plastic and form-fitting. The access ways are wide and clearly marked.

== Events ==
Since its opening, various events have been held in the stadium including sports matches and concerts. Notable events are as follows:

- April 26, 2018 - The stadium's first event took place. A student bamboo dance was performed to celebrate the 30th anniversary of the province's special economic zone. The dancers were students who came from 36 schools in 19 of Hainan's counties. The total number performing the bamboo dance was 11,914, achieving a Guinness Book of World Records world record, beating the previous bamboo dance record of 10,736 people. During the dance, at 8 pm, they formed a huge "Hainan 30". Over 15,000 spectators were in attendance.
- October 1, 2018 - A pop music concert was held featuring Jay Chou, Show Lo, Cindy Yen, Yida Huang, and several other artists.
- November 3 and 4, 2018 - Jacky Cheung
- December 24, 2022 - Joker Xue's Extraterrestrial World Tour
- September 15, 2024 - Kanye West and Ty Dolla Sign
- September 28, 2024 - Kanye West
- November 29, 2025 - Katy Perry as part of her "The Lifetimes Tour"

== Gallery ==
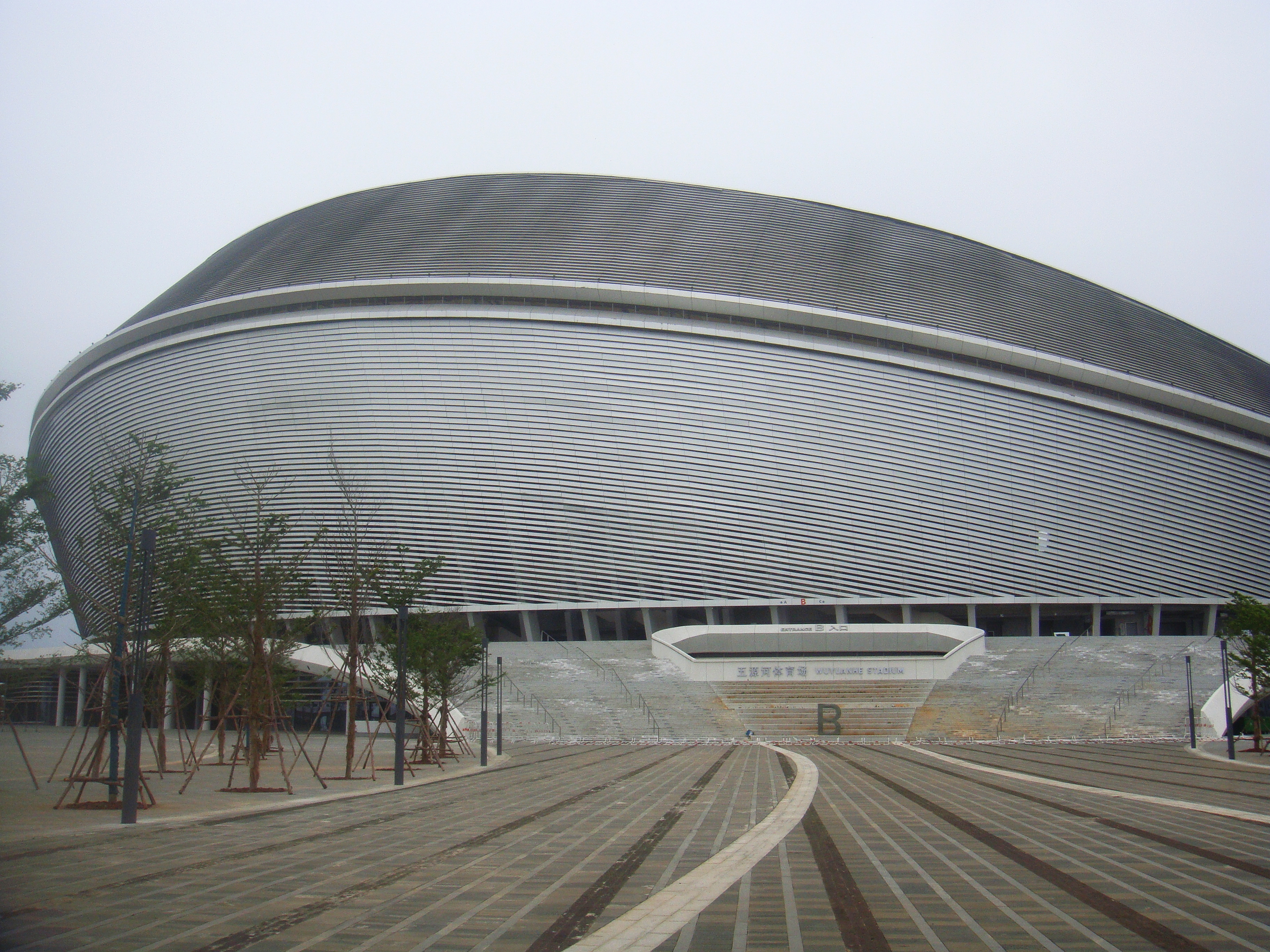

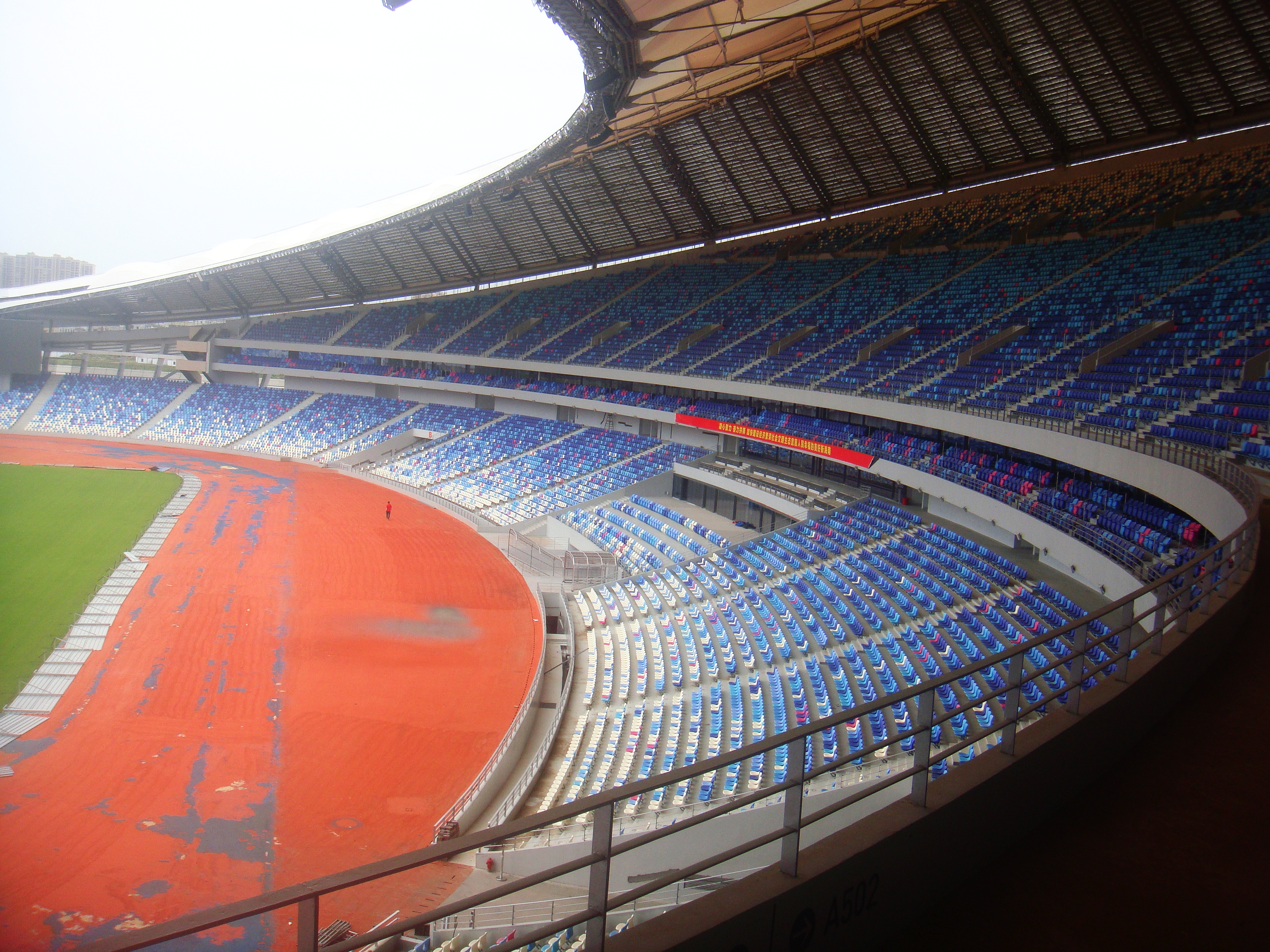

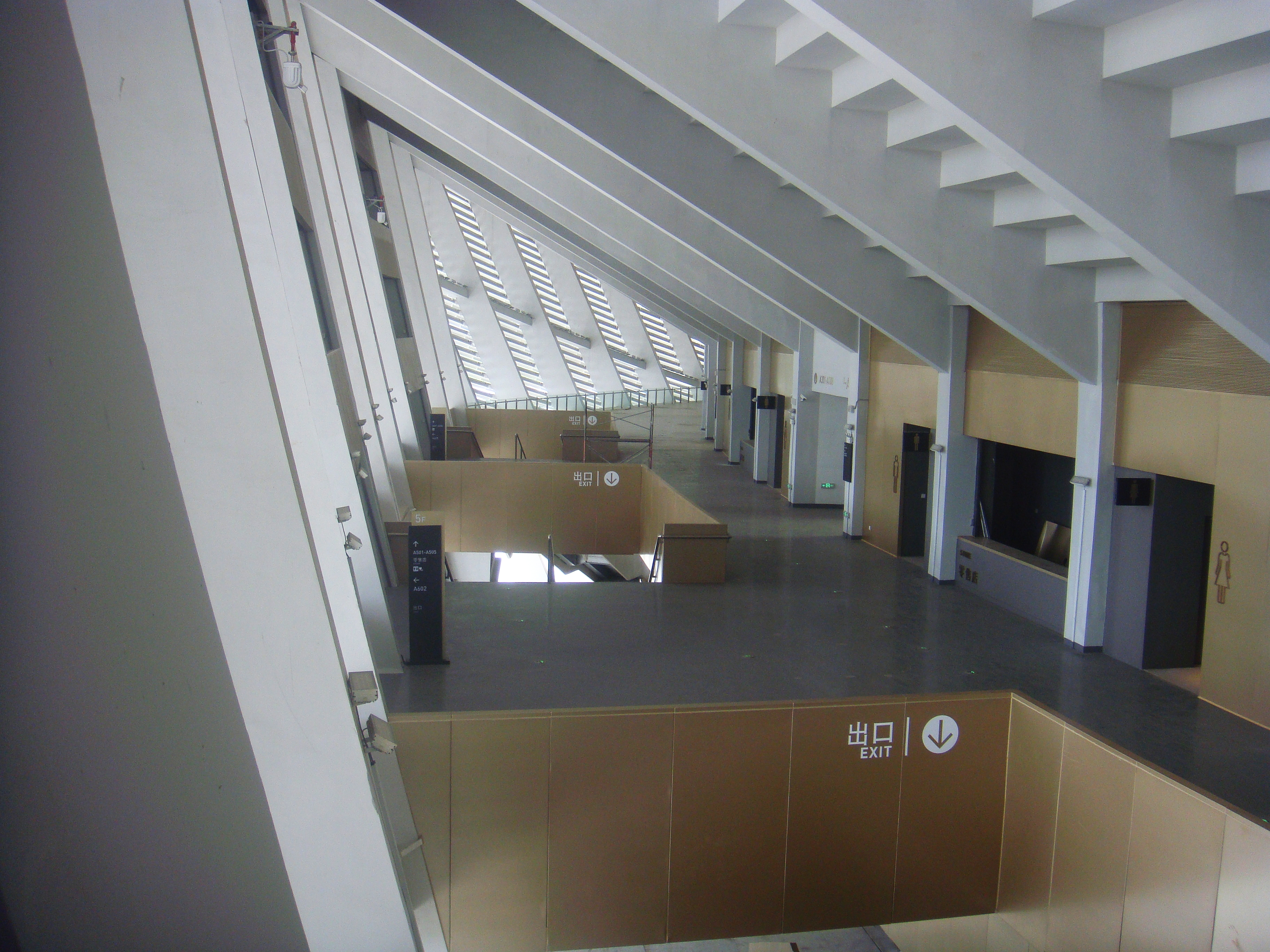

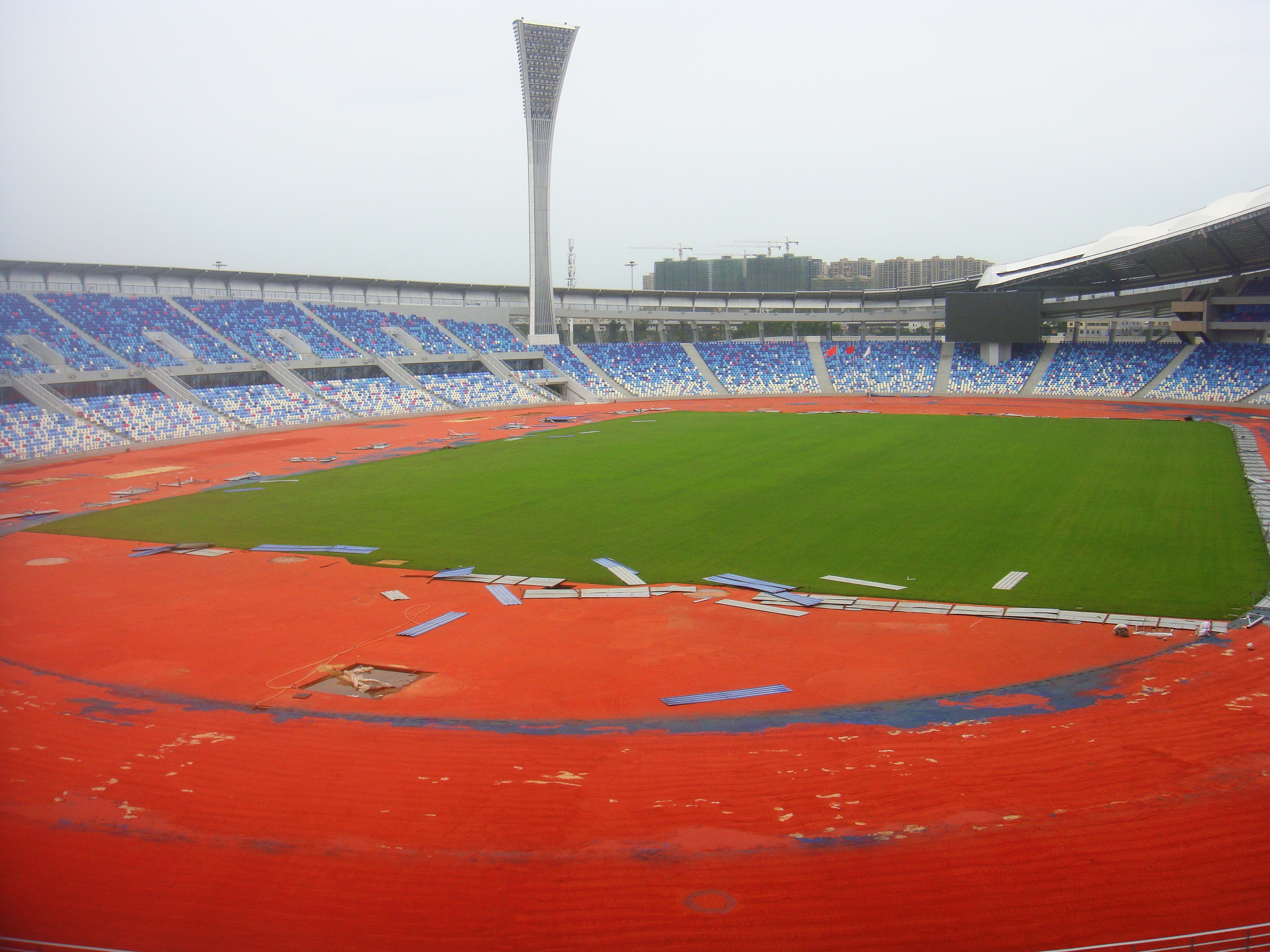

== See also ==
- List of football stadiums in China
- List of stadiums in China
- Lists of stadiums
