= Xie Hui (footballer) =

Chinese footballer and coach

Xie Hui 谢晖
Personal information
- Date of birth: February 14, 1975 (age 51)
- Place of birth: Shanghai, China
- Height: 1.85 m (6 ft 1 in)
- Position: Forward

Youth career
- 1992–1994: Shanghai Shenhua

Senior career*
Years	Team	Apps	(Gls)
1994–2000	Shanghai Shenhua	104	(25)
2000–2002	Alemannia Aachen	50	(19)
2002	→ Shanghai Shenhua (loan)	4	(0)
2002–2003	Greuther Fürth	8	(1)
2003–2004	Chongqing Lifan	11	(2)
2005–2008	Shanghai Shenhua	61	(18)
2008	→ SV Wehen Wiesbaden (loan)	5	(0)

International career
1996–2005	China	22	(9)

Managerial career
- 2009: Shanghai Shenhua (assistant)
- 2016–2019: Shanghai SIPG (assistant)
- 2020–2021: Nantong Zhiyun
- 2022–2023: Dalian Pro
- 2024–2025: Changchun Yatai
Medal record
Representing China
Men's football
EAFF Championship
Gold medal – first place	2005 South Korea	Team
- * Club domestic league appearances and goals

Xie Hui (simplified Chinese: 谢晖; traditional Chinese: 謝暉; pinyin: Xiè Huī; born February 14, 1975, in Shanghai) is a Chinese former professional football player and coach.

As a player Xie Hui played as a forward, representing Shanghai Shenhua throughout the majority of his career, having several spells with them and winning a Chinese league title and Chinese FA Cup with the club. He also represented Chongqing Lifan and German clubs Alemannia Aachen, Greuther Fürth and SV Wehen Wiesbaden throughout his career. While internationally he would play in the 1996 AFC Asian Cup and 2000 AFC Asian Cup.

== Club career ==
Xie Hui started his professional football career with Shanghai Shenhua in the 1994 season. After excelling with Shenhua for six seasons in the late 90s where he won one top-tier league title and a Chinese FA Cup, Xie Hui transferred to 2nd Bundesliga club Alemannia Aachen in January 2000. During the 2000–01 season, Xie Hui was the top scorer for Aachen with fourteen goals in twenty-four league appearances. The following season Xie Hui netted only once in thirteen appearances and because of this drop in performance, he went back to Shanghai Shenhua on loan in March 2002 to gain more first team experience and to keep his place on the China national football team. When his loan finished he transferred to another German second-tier club in Greuther Fürth in August 2002, however after only netting only once in eight league appearances for Greuther Fürth, Xie Hui came back to China to play for Chongqing Lifan in 2003.

For the third time he rejoined Shenhua in December 2004 on a permanent basis where he once again revived his career and after two years with Shenhua, Xie headed back to Germany when he joined another second tier German club SV Wehen Wiesbaden on January 1, 2008, on an 18-month contract. When his contract ended Xie would once again return to Shenhua on January 6, 2009, for a testimonial.

== International career ==
Xie Hui was China's top scorer during the 2002 FIFA World Cup qualifying stages, but he was dropped by head coach Bora Milutinović from China's final World Cup squad.

== Managerial career ==
After the game he officially retired from football and soon became an assistant manager at Shenhua. He was hired by Shanghai SIPG Football club as an assistant coach.

On August 18, 2021, while Xie Hui was the manager of Nantong Zhiyun, a leaked video of him dining with colleagues revealed his controversial comments towards management and coaching staff of other competing teams. He later was suspended by Nantong Zhiyun. After apologizing on his comments, he resigned from his manager role at the club.

=== Dalian Professional ===
On March 19, 2022, Xie was appointed as the manager of Dalian Professional. During the first year of his management, the team was initially planning to play in the China League One (the second level of professional soccer in China) due to the relegation from Chinese Super League in previous season. However, as Chongqing Liangjiang Athletic in the Chinese Super League dissolved before the start of the 2022 season, Dalian Professional was allowed to play in the Chinese Super League as a substitute for Chongqing Liangjiang Athletic for the 2022 season. On 4 November 2023, Dalian was once again relegated after a 3-2 home defeat against Shanghai Port in the final game of the season, and the club was subsequently disbanded in January 2024.

=== Changchun Yatai ===
On April 17, 2024, Xie was appointed as the manager of Chinese Super League club Changchun Yatai. On May 7, 2025, Xie resigned due to poor results, with just 1 win in 11 matches.

== Personal life ==
Xie's paternal great-grandfather, Xie Ruiying, was a doctor that was sent to Germany to study medicine after First Sino-Japanese War and briefly worked in England, where Ruiying met Julia Traver, an English nutrition nurse. Xie and Traver got married in 1918 and gave birth to Xie Hui's grandfather, Xie Dihua, who once served as a police officer in Shanghai International Settlement. Therefore, Xie Hui is of one-eighth English descendant.

On December 9, 2004, Xie married his long-term girlfriend and Chinese supermodel, Tong Chenjie (佟晨洁), however the couple divorced on June 27, 2011.

Starting from 2018, Xie started dating Dalia, a Russian model who studied for master degrees in China. The two got married on February 14, 2024. They have two children born prior to the marriage.

== Career statistics ==
No.	Date	Venue	Opponent	Score	Result	Competition
1.	April 22, 2001	Shaanxi Province Stadium, Xi'an, China	Maldives	3–0	10–1	2002 FIFA World Cup qualification
2.	April 22, 2001	Shaanxi Province Stadium, Xi'an, China	Maldives	5–0	10–1	2002 FIFA World Cup qualification
3.	April 22, 2001	Shaanxi Province Stadium, Xi'an, China	Maldives	8–1	10–1	2002 FIFA World Cup qualification
4.	April 28, 2001	Rasmee Dhandu Stadium, Malé, Maldives	Maldives	1–0	1–0	2002 FIFA World Cup qualification
5.	May 13, 2001	Kunming Tuodong Sports Center, Kunming, China	Indonesia	3–1	5–1	2002 FIFA World Cup qualification
6.	May 13, 2001	Kunming Tuodong Sports Center, Kunming, China	Indonesia	5–1	5–1	2002 FIFA World Cup qualification
7.	May 27, 2001	Gelora Bung Karno Stadium, Jakarta, Indonesia	Indonesia	1–0	2–0	2002 FIFA World Cup qualification
8.	June 22, 2005	Tianhe Stadium, Guangzhou, China	Costa Rica	2–0	2–0	Friendly
9.	August 7, 2005	Daegu World Cup Stadium, Daegu, South Korea	North Korea	2–0	2–0	2005 East Asian Football Championship

== Honours ==
Shanghai Shenhua

- Chinese Jia-A League: 1995
- Chinese FA Cup: 1998
- A3 Champions Cup: 2007
