= 2021 Dalian Professional F.C. season =

Dalian Pro
- Chairman: Zhang Lin
- Manager: José González
- Stadium: Jinzhou Stadium
- Chinese Super League: 15th
- FA Cup: Quarter-finals
- Top goalscorer: Lin Liangming (5 goals)
Home colours	Away colours

The 2021 Dalian Professional F.C. season was the 12th season in club history. The team relegated to China League One once again after this season.

== Overview ==
=== Preseason ===
Dalian Pro regrouped on 18 January for winter training at the team base. The original training plan was to train in Guangzhou, but could not be carried on as the manager yet decided to return.

The 2021 CSL saw growing pressure from three aspects. Firstly, strong COVID-prevention policies remained active, that foreign players and staff had to follow quarantine rules when entering or re-entering the border, and that teams would be concentrated into one or more cities for an enclosed, COVID-safe league. Secondly, teams participating the 2021 CSL must have neutral club names, which resulted in far less sponsorship income. Strict salary limitation was also adopted in this season. Although Dalian Pro had already switched to neutral name in the previous season, the team was still vulnerable against other policies, as football stars and manager decided to leave. On 23 January, Benitez announced through his personal website that he had parted ways with Dalian Pro. On 15 February, Rondon was loaned to CSKA Moscow until the end of the 2020-21 RPL season. On 9 March, Hamsik signed with IFK Göteborg.

Dalian Pro had a short break for the Spring Festival, and regrouped on 16 February. Since February, the team stayed in Dalian for training and friendly matches with nearby teams, Liaoning football team for the 2021 National Games of China and Shenyang Urban. The team would move to Guangzhou on 23 March for further friendly matches against other CSL teams.

On 1 April, the 2021 CSL fixtures and details were confirmed and published. League would be divided to 3 phases. Phase 1 begins from 20 April until 17 May, then pause to prepare for the World Cup Qualification. P2 would be from 21 June to 5 August, and P3 from 24 October to 1 December.

=== April–May ===
The squad and manager of Dalian Pro was officially made public on 18 April, although sources had already reported the major changes. The team arrived in Suzhou the same day. As of April, Danielson was the only foreign player in squad, although the team registered all of them. Boateng did not return in time due to visa issues after his national team matches. Jailson, like a few other Brazilian players, had difficulties acquiring visas due to the pandemic situation in Brazil. Swedish media reported rumors between Larsson and IFK Göteborg, but he later clarified personally that he was affected by COVID-19, and was unable to return to China at the time.

The team struggled with single foreign player Danielson, and saw their first win on 11 May against Tianjin with his precious subsequent shot during a corner.

=== Interval 1 ===
Boateng finally arrived in China in June. He would join the team in July after quarantine.

Stage 2 matches were due to begin on 22 June after the World Cup qualification second round. As the matches were unexpectedly rearranged to the Emirates instead of China due to multiple reasons, the league reached a consensus to postpone the schedule, as national players had to follow quarantine rules after travelling abroad.

In July, the fixtures were revised and shortened to 22 rounds. The 2021 CSL would finish its Stage 1 on 12 August, then enter an unprecedented 4-month sacrificial pause for the World Cup qualification third round, and conduct its Stage 2 from 1 December until January 2022.

=== July–September ===
Although it was widely believed that Rondon would leave after he returned from loan, Dalian Pro surprisingly registered for him before the summer transfer window closed. Nevertheless, he rejoined Benitez at Everton right before the summer window closed.

The team kept struggling at the bottom of the group. Although Lin Liangming emerged as the best scorer in squad, and Danielson returned from the UEFA Euro on time, the team still suffered from lack of foreign players, and entered the relegation group without much surprise. The only good news was that, Larsson, after a few months of recovery, gained access for travelling back to China.

=== Interval 2 ===
Wang Jinxian's goal against China U-20 in the FA cup was recognized as the club's 500th goal in history.

Lin Liangming had a rib fracture during the training, causing him to miss the rest of the season.

=== December, season ending ===
Larsson scored a free kick in the first match upon his returning, making a good start for the team in the relegation group. In the following matches, multiple players suffered from injuries, and Dalian Pro fell behind to 15th after 3 consecutive losses. Although Dalian achieved the biggest win this season by 4–1 against Qingdao, they still finished the season at 15th, and eventually beaten by Chengdu Rongcheng in the relegation playoff.

=== Summary ===

Stage 1 lineups

Stage 2 lineups

Dalian Pro struggled throughout this season due to a lineup too thin to withstand fragmented but intense schedules.

During the first stage, Danilson was the only foreign player in squad. Shan Huanhuan's contribution was not enough for the team's offensive side, resulting only 2 wins out of the total 14. Boateng returned in June, but his support could not make much difference. On the other hand, Lin Liangming's performance was beyond expectation, scoring 5 goals out of total 12. However, he suffered from rib fracture before the second stage, while led to further troubles for Dalian Pro.

As the second stage draws near, Dalian Pro could finally come up with 3 starting foreign players, despite the fact that most CSL teams have another for substitution. In the first 4 matches, the team acquired 3 victories by better stamina and spirit than the opponents, that most media believed that Dalian Pro could flee from relegation zone. Desperate time came when intense schedule brought injuries to starting players. Dong Yanfeng, Danielson, Wu Wei and Boateng all had muscle issues, and in the next 3 matches, Dalian Pro was lagged back into the relegation area, and eventually lost in the relegation playoffs.

== Squad ==
=== First team squad ===
As of 16 April 2021

No.	Name	Nat.	Place of birth	Date of birth (age)	Joined	From	Note
Goalkeepers
1	Zhang Chong	(China)	(China) Dalian	25 November 1987 (aged 33)	2013	Dalian Shide	
12	Xu Jiamin	(China)	(China) Shanghai	11 April 1994 (aged 27)	2020	Beijing Renhe	
32	Kudirat Ablet	(China)	(China) Yining	5 February 1997 (aged 24)	2021	(Portugal) Gondomar	
36	Wang Jinshuai	(China)	(China) Dalian	9 January 2001 (aged 20)	2021	Dalian Pro youth	
Defenders
3	Shan Pengfei	(China)	(China) Dalian	7 May 1993 (aged 27)	2012	Dalian Yifang youth	
4	Li Shuai	(China)	(China) Shenyang	18 June 1995 (aged 25)	2016	(Portugal) Mafra	
11	Sun Guowen	(China)	(China) Dalian	30 September 1993 (aged 27)	2013	Dalian Shide	
13	Wang Yaopeng	(China)	(China) Dalian	18 January 1995 (aged 26)	2014	Liaoning youth	
14	Huang Jiahui	(China)	(China) Bozhou	7 October 2000 (aged 20)	2019	Dalian Yifang youth	
16	Tong Lei	(China)	(China) Quzhou	16 December 1997 (aged 23)	2020	Zhejiang Greentown	
18	He Yupeng	(China)	(China) Anshan	5 December 1999 (aged 21)	2019	Dalian Yifang youth	
22	Dong Yanfeng	(China)	(China) Dalian	11 February 1996 (aged 25)	2016	Liaoning youth	
30	Marcus Danielson	(Sweden)	(Sweden) Eskistuna	8 April 1989 (aged 32)	2020	(Sweden) Djurgårdens IF	
33	Wang Xianjun	(China)	(China) Dalian	1 June 2000 (aged 20)	2020	Dalian Pro youth	
35	Wan Yu	(China)	(China) Heze	20 June 2002 (aged 18)	Mid 2021	Dalian Pro youth	
37	Yang Haoyu	(China)	(China) Kunming	31 July 2000 (aged 20)	2020	Hubei Chufeng United	
Midfielders
5	Wu Wei	(China)	(China) Xinxiang	5 February 1997 (aged 24)	2020	Tianjin Tianhai	
7	Zhao Xuri^{C}	(China)	(China) Dalian	3 December 1985 (aged 35)	2019	Tianjin Quanjian	
10	Sam Larsson	(Sweden)	(Sweden) Gothenburg	10 April 1993 (aged 28)	2020	(Netherlands) Feyenoord	
20	Wang Jinxian	(China)	(China) Wuhan	12 January 1996 (aged 25)	2014	Dalian Yifang youth	
24	Tao Qianglong	(China)	(China) Fuyang	20 November 2001 (aged 19)	2020	Hebei China Fortune	
25	Jailson Siqueira	(Brazil)	Caçapava do Sul	7 September 1995 (aged 25)	2020	(Turkey) Fenerbahçe	
26	Cui Ming'an	(China)	(China) Dalian	15 November 1994 (aged 26)	2014	Dalian Yifang youth	
28	Lin Liangming	(China)	(China) Shantou	4 June 1997 (aged 23)	2020	(Portugal) Gondomar	
29	Sun Bo	(China)	(China) Dalian	22 January 1991 (aged 30)	2011	Shandong Luneng youth	
31	Zheng Long^{VC}	(China)	(China) Qingdao	15 April 1988 (aged 32)	2019	Guangzhou Evergrande	
34	Wang Zhen'ao	(China)	(China) Wuhan	10 August 1999 (aged 21)	2020	Dalian Pro youth	
39	Wang Tengda	(China)	(China) Dalian	18 February 2001 (aged 20)	2020	Dalian Pro youth	
40	Zhu Jiaxuan	(China)	(China) Dalian	13 April 1999 (aged 22)	2020	Dalian Pro youth	
66	Wang Yu	(China)	(China) Dalian	28 April 2002 (aged 18)	Mid 2021	Dalian Pro youth	
Forwards
9	Shan Huanhuan	(China)	(China) Pingdingshan	24 January 1999 (aged 22)	2019	(Portugal) Vitória Guimarães B	
15	Zhao Jianbo	(China)	(China) Dalian	7 May 2001 (aged 19)	2020	Dalian Pro youth	
21	Emmanuel Boateng	(Ghana)	(Ghana) Accra	23 May 1996 (aged 24)	2019	(Spain) Levante	
Un-registered during the season
2	Yang Lei	(China)	(China) Handan	22 February 2000 (aged 21)	2021	Dalian Pro youth	Reserved
17	Zhang Jiansheng	(China)	(China) Xingtai	30 December 1999 (aged 20)	2020	Dalian Pro youth	Loaned out
23	Li Xuebo	(China)	(China) Dalian	15 November 1999 (aged 21)	2019	(Spain) Atlético Madrid B	Loaned out
27	Yang Pengju	(China)	(China) Guiyang	6 June 2000 (aged 20)	2020	Dalian Pro youth	Loaned out
38	Kong Yinquan	(China)	(China) Guangzhou	23 September 2000 (aged 20)	2021	Dalian Pro youth	Reserved

== Coaching staff ==
As of 16 April 2021

Position	Name	Notes
First team
Head coach	(Spain) José González	
Assistant coach	(Spain) Alfonso Cortijo	
Goalkeeping coach	(Spain) Jorge Bartual	
Medical advisor	(China) Song Jinhua	
Physiotherapist	(Spain) Javier Sagaste	
Team doctor	(China) Jia Shunhao	
Team doctor	(Spain) Alberto Fernández Morán	
Technical coach	(China) Jiang Zongyan	
Reserve and youth teams
Reserve (U-23) coach	(Spain) David Rivas Martínez	
U-21 coach	(China) Liu Yujian	
U-21 assistant coach	(China) Zhou Ting	
U-19 coach	(China) Sun Wei	
U-17 coach	(China) Zhang Yaokun	
U-17 assistant coach	(China) Zou Peng	
U-17 assistant coach	(China) Li Wenbo	
U-15 coach	(China) Zhao Peng	
U-15 assistant coach	(China) Chi Yaojun	
U-14 coach	(China) Li Yang	
U-15 assistant coach	(China) Zou Jie	
U-13 coach	(China) Wang Zhaochen	

== Transfers ==
=== Pre-season ===
==== In ====
No.	Pos.	Name	Age	Moving from	Type	Transfer fee	Date	Notes	Ref.
-	GK	(China) Kudirat Ablet	24	(Portugal) Gondomar	Transfer		9 March 2021		
-	DF	(China) Yang Haoyu	21	(China) Hubei Istar	Loan		—		
-	MF	(China) Liu Yingchen	28	(China) Beijing Renhe	Loan Return				

==== Out ====
No.	Pos.	Name	Age	Moving to	Type	Transfer fee	Date	Notes	Ref.
-	DF	(China) Zhou Ting	42	—	Retired	—	—	Announced in 2020	
37	MF	(China) Yang Haoyu	21	(China) Hubei Istar	End of loan	—	12 December 2020		
9	FW	(Venezuela) Salomón Rondón	31	(Russia) CSKA Moscow	Loan		15 February 2021		
17	MF	(Slovakia) Marek Hamšík	33	(Sweden) IFK Göteborg	Released		9 March 2021		
25	DF	(China) Li Jianbin	31	(China) Chengdu Rongcheng	Transfer	Free			
33	FW	(China) Zhao Xuebin	28	(China) Cangzhou Mighty Lions	Transfer	Free			
-	FW	(Hong Kong) Alex Akande	32	(Hong Kong) Kitchee	Transfer	Free	30 March 2021		
-	MF	(China) Han Peijiang	21	(China) Xi'an Wolves	Loan	—	3 April 2021		
8	DF	(China) Zhu Ting	35	(China) Qingdao	Transfer	Free	9 April 2021		
-	DF	(China) Hu Jiali	22	(China) Qingdao	Transfer	Free	9 April 2021		
19	GK	(China) Xue Qinghao	21	(China) Shanghai Shenhua	Transfer	Free	12 April 2021		
27	DF	(China) Cheng Hui	22	—	Released				
36	DF	(China) Zhou Xiao	24	—	Released				
-	DF	(China) Yang Zexiang	26	(China) Shanghai Shenhua	Transfer				
-	MF	(China) Li Qinghao	22	(China) Jiangxi Beidamen	Transfer				
-	MF	(China) Zheng Bofan	26	(China) Kunshan	Loan				
-	MF	(China) Liu Yingchen	28	(China) Xi'an Wolves	Loan				

=== Mid-season ===
==== In ====
No.	Pos.	Name	Age	Moving from	Type	Transfer fee	Date	Notes	Ref.
19	FW	(Venezuela) Salomón Rondón	31	(Russia) CSKA Moscow	Loan return		18 May		
-	MF	(China) Zheng Bofan	26	(China) Kunshan	Loan Return				
-	MF	(China) Liu Yingchen	28	(China) Xi'an Wolves	Loan Return				

==== Out ====
No.	Pos.	Name	Age	Moving to	Type	Transfer fee	Date	Notes	Ref.
17	FW	(China) Zhang Jiansheng	20	(China) Beijing BSU	Loan	—	10 July		
27	DF	(China) Yang Pengju	20	(China) Beijing BSU	Loan	—	10 July		
23	GK	(China) Li Xuebo	21	(China) Zibo Cuju	Loan	—	10 July		
19	FW	(Venezuela) Salomón Rondón	31	(England) Everton	Transfer	Free	31 August		
-	MF	(China) Zheng Bofan	26	(China) Beijing BSU	Loan				
-	MF	(China) Liu Yingchen	28	(China) Dandong Tengyue	Loan				
-	MF	(China) Cheng Xianfeng	20	(China) Kunshan	Transfer				

== Friendlies ==
Preseason

20 February 2021 Friendly	Dalian Pro	2–1	Liaoning	Dalian, Liaoning
11:00 (UTC+08:00)	Shan Huanhuan; Kong Yinquan			Stadium: Dalian Pro Soccer Academy Base

27 February 2021 Friendly	Dalian Pro	3–1	Liaoning	Dalian, Liaoning
(UTC+08:00)				Stadium: Dalian Pro Soccer Academy Base

6 March 2021 Friendly	Dalian Pro	6–0	Liaoning	Dalian, Liaoning
10:30 (UTC+08:00)	Sun Bo; Zheng Long; Tao Qianglong; Zhang Jiansheng; Shan Huanhuan			Stadium: Dalian Pro Soccer Academy Base

13 March 2021 Friendly	Dalian Pro	1–1	Liaoning Shenyang Urban	Dalian, Liaoning
11:00 (UTC+08:00)	Sun Bo			Stadium: Dalian Pro Soccer Academy Base

20 March 2021 Friendly	Dalian Pro	2–1	Liaoning Shenyang Urban	Dalian, Liaoning
11:00 (UTC+08:00)	Sun Bo; Zheng Long			Stadium: Dalian Pro Soccer Academy Base

27 March 2021 Friendly	Dalian Pro	5–5	Meizhou Hakka	Jiangmen, Guangdong
(UTC+08:00)	Shan Huanhuan; Sun Bo; Zheng Long; Lin Liangming			Stadium: Jiangmen Sports Center

1 April 2021 Friendly	Dalian Pro	1–2	China U-22	Guangzhou, Guangdong
(UTC+08:00)	Shan Huanhuan 82' (pen.)		Liu Chaoyang 23'; Fang Hao 72'

4 April 2021 Friendly	Dalian Pro	0–3	Cangzhou Mighty Lions	Jiangmen, Guangdong
16:30 (UTC+08:00)			Zang Yifeng; Zhao Xuebin; Liu Xinyu

7 April 2021 Friendly	Dalian Pro	1–1	Chongqing Liangjiang Athletic	Dongguan, Guangdong
15:00 (UTC+08:00)	Lin Liangming		Miller Bolaños

Interval 1

16 June 2021 Friendly	Dalian Pro	2–0	China U22	Dalian, Liaoning
16:30 (UTC+08:00)	Lin Liangming; Chen Rong			Stadium: Dalian Pro Soccer Academy Base

25 June 2021 Friendly	Dalian Pro	1–1	Beijing BSU	Dalian, Liaoning
	Zhao Jianbo		Ji Shengpan	Stadium: Dalian Pro Soccer Academy Base

3 July 2021 Friendly	Dalian Pro	4–1	Liaoning Shenyang Urban	Dalian, Liaoning
10:30 (UTC+08:00)				Stadium: Dalian Pro Soccer Academy Base

6 July 2021 Friendly	Dalian Pro	1–1	Zibo Cuju	Dalian, Liaoning
				Stadium: Dalian Pro Soccer Academy Base

Interval 2

18 November 2021 Friendly	Dalian Pro	2–2	Beijing BSU	Dalian, Liaoning
	Tao Qianglong; Sun Bo (pen.)		TBD	Stadium: Dalian Pro Soccer Academy Base

19 November 2021 Friendly	Dalian Pro	4–2	Beijing BSU	Dalian, Liaoning
	Boateng; Shan Huanhuan; Lin Liangming; Wang Xianjun		TBD	Stadium: Dalian Pro Soccer Academy Base

== Chinese Super League ==
=== Stage 1 – group B (Suzhou Stadia) ===
==== Group B standings ====
Pos	Team	Pld	W	D	L	GF	GA	GD	Pts	Qualification or relegation
4	Hebei	14	6	5	3	12	11	+1	23	Qualification for Championship stage
5	Shanghai Shenhua	14	6	4	4	21	17	+4	22	Qualification for Relegation stage
6	Wuhan	14	1	8	5	11	19	−8	11	Qualification for Relegation stage
7	Tianjin Jinmen Tiger	14	2	3	9	11	29	−18	9	Qualification for Relegation stage
8	Dalian Pro	14	2	1	11	12	29	−17	7	Qualification for Relegation stage

Source: CSL, Soccerway
Rules for classification:
- During season: 1) Points; 2) Goal difference; 3) Goals scored.
- After season: 1) Points; 2) Head-to-head points; 3) Head-to-head goal difference; 4) Head-to-head goals scored; 5) Scores of the weight ratio of the reserve league and youth leagues.

==== Results summary ====
Overall								Home						Away					
Pld	W	D	L	GF	GA	GD	Pts	W	D	L	GF	GA	GD	W	D	L	GF	GA	GD
14	2	1	11	12	29	−17	7	1	1	5	5	14	−9	1	0	6	7	15	−8

==== Positions by round ====
Round	1	2	3	4	5	6	7	8	9	10	11	12	13	14
Ground	H	H	A	H	A	A	H	A	A	H	A	H	H	A
Result	L	L	L	W	L	L	D	L	L	L	W	L	L	L
Position	6	7	8	6	7	8	8	8	8	8	6	7	8	8

Updated to match(es) played on 15 August. Source: Results
A = Away; H = Home; W = Win; D = Draw; L = Loss

==== Fixtures and results ====
22 April 2021 1	Dalian Pro	1–2	Changchun Yatai	Jiangyin, Jiangsu
18:00 (UTC+08:00)	Danielson 90+3' (pen.); Tao Qianglong (yellow card) 90+5'	Report	Júnior Negrão 35'; Erik Lima 61'; Wang Peng (yellow card) 67'	Stadium: Jiangyin Stadium; Referee: Liang Caiwei; Assistant referees: Luo Zheng, Tang Rongdi; Fourth official: Dai Yige

28 April 2021 2	Dalian Pro	0–1	Hebei	Kunshan, Jiangsu
20:00 (UTC+08:00)		Report	Wang Qiuming (yellow card) 35'; Marcão 80' (pen.)	Stadium: Kunshan Sports Centre Stadium; Referee: Wang Jing; Assistant referees: Xi Fei, Zhang Haijun; Fourth official: Jia Zhiliang

4 May 2021 3	Beijing Guoan	2–0	Dalian Pro	Jiangyin, Jiangsu
20:00 (UTC+08:00)	Yu Dabao (yellow card) 28'; Zhang Xizhe 53', 55'; Gao Tianyi (yellow card) 65'; Chi Zhongguo (yellow card) 71'	Report	Tong Lei (yellow card) 59' (yellow-red card) 73'; Sun Guowen (yellow card) 90+3'	Stadium: Jiangyin Stadium; Referee: Liang Caiwei; Assistant referees: Guo Jingtao, Hu Chengjun; Fourth official: Tang Shunqi

11 May 2021 4	Dalian Pro	1–0	Tianjin Jinmen Tiger	Kunshan, Jiangsu
18:00 (UTC+08:00)	Danielson 80'	Report	Qian Yumiao (yellow card) 25'; Teng Shangkun (yellow card) 65'	Stadium: Kunshan Sports Centre Stadium; Referee: Li Haixin; Assistant referees: Sun Kai, Liu Xing; Fourth official: Xing Qi

16 May 2021 5	Shanghai Port	3–0	Dalian Pro	Suzhou, Jiangsu
18:00 (UTC+08:00)	Lü Wenjun 19'; Yang Shiyuan (yellow card) 74'; Oscar 39', 90+1' (pen.)	Report	Shan Pengfei (yellow card) 73'; Zheng Long (yellow card) 73'	Stadium: Suzhou Sports Center; Referee: Xing Qi; Assistant referees: Guo Jingtao, Ma Qiang; Fourth official: Huang Yi

19 July 2021 6	Shanghai Shenhua	3–2	Dalian Pro	Kunshan, Jiangsu
18:30 (UTC+08:00)	Bi Jinhao 54'; Wu Xi 61'; Sun Shilin (yellow card) 84'; Zhao Mingjian 90+1'	Report	Wu Wei (yellow card) 25'; Zhao Xuri 71' (yellow card) 79'; Huang Jiahui 81'	Stadium: Kunshan Sports Centre Stadium; Referee: Jin Jingyuan; Assistant referees: Tang Rongdi. Zhang Haijun; Fourth official: Li Zheng

22 July 2021 7	Dalian Pro	1–1	Wuhan	Kunshan, Jiangsu
20:30 (UTC+08:00)	Lin Liangming 8'; Tong Lei (yellow card) 27'; Zhao Xuri (yellow card) 39'; Wu Wei (yellow card) 58'	Report	Evrard 14'; Carriço (yellow card) 56'	Stadium: Kunshan Sports Centre Stadium; Referee: Jia Zhiliang; Assistant referees: Liu Xing, Ma Kexi; Fourth official: Li Zheng

25 July 2021 8	Changchun Yatai	v	Dalian Pro	Suzhou, Jiangsu
Postponed due to typhoon				Stadium: Suzhou Sports Center training pitch

28 July 2021 9	Hebei	1–0	Dalian Pro	Kunshan, Jiangsu
16:30 (UTC+08:00)	Zhang Wei 21'; Yao Xuchen (yellow card) 41'; Bao Yaxiong (yellow card) 90+3'	Report	Wu Wei (yellow card) 66'; Yang Haoyu (yellow card) 90+4'; Dong Yanfeng (red card) 90+7'	Stadium: Kunshan Sports Centre Stadium; Referee: Li Zheng; Assistant referees: Zhang Haijun, Yang Xi; Fourth official: Jia Zhiliang

31 July 2021 10	Dalian Pro	0–1	Beijing Guoan	Jiangyin, Jiangsu
18:30 (UTC+08:00)	Wang Xianjun (yellow card) 47'; Boateng (yellow card) 74'	Report	Yu Yang (yellow card) 29'; Bakambu 75' (pen.) (yellow card) 77'; Gao Tianyi (yellow card) 90+5'	Stadium: Jiangyin Stadium; Referee: Ji Jingyuan; Assistant referees: Huang Tao, Ma Kexi; Fourth official: Memetjan Ahmat

3 August 2021 11	Tianjin Jinmen Tiger	1–3	Dalian Pro	Jiangyin, Jiangsu
20:30 (UTC+08:00)	Cong Zhen (yellow card) 12'; Song Yue (yellow card) 42'; Zhou Tong (yellow card) 85'; Magno Cruz 90+2'	Report	Tao Qianglong 7'; Boateng 63' (pen.); Lin Liangming 68'; Shan Pengfei (yellow card) 74'; Wu Wei (yellow card) 86'	Stadium: Jiangyin Stadium; Referee: Li Haixin; Assistant referees: Liu Xing, Yang Delin; Fourth official: Wan Tao

6 August 2021 12	Dalian Pro	0–5	Shanghai Port	Suzhou, Jiangsu
20:30 (UTC+08:00)	He Yupeng (yellow card) 62'	Report	Zhang Huachen 10'; Yang Shiyuan 45+1'; Lü Wenjun 56'; Ablahan Haliq 86'; Li Shenglong 87'	Stadium: Suzhou Sports Center; Referee: Huang Yi; Assistant referees: Xi Fei, Huang Tao; Fourth official: Dai Yige

9 August 2021 13	Dalian Pro	2–4	Shanghai Shenhua	Suzhou, Jiangsu
16:30 (UTC+08:00)	Wang Yaopeng (yellow card) 13'; Li Shuai (yellow card) 22'; Lin Liangming 19' (pen.); Zheng Long 30' (yellow card) 67'; He Yupeng (yellow card) 61'; Zhao Xuri (yellow card) 68'	Report	Bassogog 4', 65'; Miezejewski 15' (pen.); Zhu Chenjie (yellow card) 29'; Moreno 45+2'; Peng Xinli (yellow card) 79'	Stadium: Suzhou Sports Center training pitch Referee: Xing Qi; Assistant referees: Guo Jingtao, Tang Rongdi; Fourth official: Huang Yi

11 August 2021 14	Wuhan	2–1	Dalian Pro	Jiangyin, Jiangsu
18:30 (UTC+08:00)	Zhao Honglüe 4' (yellow card) 29'; Anderson Lopes 37' (yellow card) 90'; Ye Chongqiu (yellow card) 80'	Report	Lin Liangming 1'; Wu Wei (yellow card) 27'	Stadium: Jiangyin Stadium; Referee: Li Haixin; Assistant referees: Shi Xiang. Xi Fei; Fourth official: Memetjan Ahmat

15 August 2021 8	Changchun Yatai	3–1	Dalian Pro	Suzhou, Jiangsu
16:30 (UTC+08:00)	Júnior Negrão 11', 79'; Serginho 26'	Report	Tong Lei (yellow card) 50'; Dong Yanfeng (yellow card) 57'; Lin Liangming 90+2'	Stadium: Suzhou Sports Center training pitch Referee: Zhang Long; Assistant referees: Liu Xing, Ma Kexi; Fourth official: Wan Tao

=== Stage 2 – relegation group ===
==== Relegation group standings ====
Pos	Team	Pld	W	D	L	GF	GA	GD	Pts	Qualification or relegation
12	Tianjin Jinmen Tiger	22	5	6	11	18	35	−17	21	
13	Chongqing Liangjiang Athletic (R, D)	22	5	5	12	21	36	−15	20 (Note: Chongqing Liangjiang Athletic finished ahead of Wuhan on head-to-head points: Chongqing Liangjiang Athletic 0–0 Wuhan, Wuhan 1–2 Chongqing Liangjiang Athletic.)	Dissolved after season
14	Wuhan	22	3	11	8	23	30	−7	20	
15	Dalian Pro (T)	22	6	1	15	21	37	−16	19	Qualification for relegation play-offs
16	Qingdao (R, D)	22	3	2	17	13	52	−39	11	Dissolved after season

Source: Soccerway
Rules for classification:
- During season: 1) Points; 2) Goal difference; 3) Goals scored.
- After season: 1) Points; 2) Head-to-head points; 3) Head-to-head goal difference; 4) Head-to-head goals scored; 5) Scores of the weight ratio of the reserve league and youth leagues.
  (D) Disqualified; (R) Relegated; (T) Qualified, but not yet for the particular phase indicated
  Notes:

==== Results summary ====
Overall								Home						Away					
Pld	W	D	L	GF	GA	GD	Pts	W	D	L	GF	GA	GD	W	D	L	GF	GA	GD
8	4	0	4	9	8	+1	12	2	0	2	6	4	+2	2	0	2	3	4	−1

==== Positions by round ====
Round	15	16	17	18	19	20	21	22
Ground	H	A	H	A	A	H	A	H
Result	W	W	L	W	L	L	L	W
Position	14	12	13	13	13	14	15	15

Updated to match(es) played on 3 January 2022. Source: Results
A = Away; H = Home; W = Win; D = Draw; L = Loss

==== Fixtures and results ====
12 December 2021 15	Dalian Pro	1–0	Henan Songshan Longmen	Suzhou, Jiangsu
19:30 (UTC+08:00)	Wu Wei (yellow card) 15'; Larsson 83'; Tong Lei (yellow card) 90+4'	Report	Chen Hao (yellow card) 18'; Fernando Karanga (yellow card) 73'; Wang Shangyuan (yellow card) 81'	Stadium: Jiangyin Stadium; Referee: Memetjan Ahmat; Assistant referees: Luo Zheng, Ma Kexi; Fourth official: Dai Yige

15 December 2021 16	Chongqing Liangjiang Athletic	0–1	Dalian Pro	Kunshan, Jiangsu
15:30 (UTC+08:00)	Liu Le (yellow card) 60'; Jiang Shenglong (yellow card) 90'	Report	Boateng 40'; Cui Ming'an (yellow card) 90'; Dong Yanfeng (yellow card) 90+5'	Stadium: Kunshan Sports Centre Stadium; Referee: Dai Yige; Assistant referees: Sun Kai, Jin Chao; Fourth official: Liang Caiwei

18 December 2021 17	Dalian Pro	1–2	Cangzhou Mighty Lions	Suzhou, Jiangsu
15:30 (UTC+08:00)	Boateng 52' (pen.); Wu Wei (yellow card) 80'; Zhao Xuri (yellow card) 90+6'	Report	Xie Pengfei 3', 38'; Liu Xinyu (yellow card) 55'; Sabit Abdusalam (yellow card) 83'; Yang Yun (yellow card) 90+6'	Stadium: Suzhou Sports Center; Referee: Ai Kun; Assistant referees: Deng Bo, Ma Qiang; Fourth official: Aihemaiti Maimaitijiang

21 December 2021 18	Qingdao	1–2	Dalian Pro	Kunshan, Jiangsu
19:30 (UTC+08:00)	Memet-Abdulla Ezmat (yellow card) 20'; Liu Jiashen 43'; Hu Jiali (yellow card) 47'	Report	Li Shuai (yellow card) 23'; Boateng 49'; Sun Guowen (yellow card) 76'; Larsson 79'; Huang Jiahui (yellow card) 82'; Zhang Chong (yellow card) 90+7'; Wu Wei (yellow card) 90+9'	Stadium: Kunshan Sports Centre Stadium; Referee: Niu Minghui; Assistant referees: Tang Chao, Jin Jun; Fourth official: Liu Zhao

25 December 2021 19	Henan Songshan Longmen	1–0	Dalian Pro	Suzhou, Jiangsu
19:30 (UTC+08:00)	Ivo 40' (pen.); Wang Guoming (yellow card) 69'	Report	Shan Pengfei (yellow card) 39'; Sun Bo (yellow card) 90+3'	Stadium: Suzhou Sports Center; Referee: Li Haixin; Assistant referees: Zhou Fei， Sun Kai; Fourth official: Wan Tao

28 December 2021 20	Dalian Pro	0–1	Chongqing Liangjiang Athletic	Suzhou, Jiangsu
15:30 (UTC+08:00)	Larsson (yellow card) 49'; Huang Jiahui (yellow card) 61'; Zhao Xuri (yellow card) 79'; Wang Yaopeng (yellow card) 90+1'; Sun Bo (yellow card) 90+3'	Report	Feng Jin 59'; Jiang Shenglong (yellow card) 69'; Deng Xiaofei (yellow card) 82'; Chen Jie (yellow card) 90+3'; Wu Qing (yellow card) 90+5'	Stadium: Suzhou Olympic Sports Centre; Referee: Tang Shunqi; Assistant referees: Guo Jingtao, Deng Bo; Fourth official: Jia Zhiliang

31 December 2021 21	Cangzhou Mighty Lions	2–0	Dalian Pro	Suzhou, Jiangsu
15:30 (UTC+08:00)	Oscar Maritu 59', 90+3'; Zhang Xiangshuo (yellow card) 77'; Xie Pengfei (yellow card) 90+1'	Report	Dong Yanfeng (yellow card) 12'; Li Shuai (yellow card) 31'; Tong Lei (yellow card) 90+1'	Stadium: Jiangyin Stadium; Referee: Li Haixin; Assistant referees: Shi Xiang, Tang Chao; Fourth official: Liang Caiwei

3 January 2022 22	Dalian Pro	4–1	Qingdao	Suzhou, Jiangsu
15:30 (UTC+08:00)	Shan Huanhuan 37', 84' (yellow card) 38'; Tao Qianglong 56'; Larsson 74' (pen.)	Report	Wang Hao 52'; Yang Yu (red card) 69'	Stadium: Suzhou Olympic Sports Centre; Referee: Shi Zhenlu; Assistant referees: Tang Chao, Ma Kexi; Fourth official: Jia Zhiliang

=== Relegation playoff ===
8 January 2022 RP1	Chengdu Rongcheng	1–1	Dalian Pro	Suzhou, Jiangsu
15:30 (UTC+08:00)	Gou Junchen (yellow card) 38'; Rômulo (yellow card) 45+2'; Feng Zhuoyi (yellow card) 67'; Felipe 81' (pen.); Gan Chao (yellow card) 84'; Gan Rui (yellow card) 90+3'	Report	Sun Guowen (yellow card) 20' (yellow-red card) 55' (goal) 42'; Wang Jinxian (yellow card) 90'	Stadium: Jiangyin Stadium, Suzhou; Referee: Li Haixin; Assistant referees: Ma Ji, Tang Chao; Fourth official: Liang Caiwei

12 January 2022 RP2	Dalian Pro	0–1 (1–2 agg.)	Chengdu Rongcheng	Suzhou, Jiangsu
15:30 (UTC+08:00)	Li Shuai (yellow card) 88'	Report	Romulo 72'; Gan Rui (yellow card) 84'	Stadium: Jiangyin Stadium, Suzhou; Referee: Wang Zhe; Assistant referees: Zhou Fei, Deng Bo; Fourth official: Zhang Long

== Chinese FA Cup ==
=== FA Cup fixtures and results ===
As of 19 October 2021

13 October 2021 1	Dalian Pro	2–1	China U-20	Dalian, Liaoning
19:30 (UTC+08:00)	Lin Liangming 15'; Sun Guowen (yellow card) 65'; Wang Jinxian 89'	Report	Jia Feifan 13'	Stadium: Dalian Pro Football Academy Base; Referee: Ma Li; Assistant referees: Ma Ji, Ma Qiang; Fourth official: Wang Haidong

18 October 2021 2	Dalian Pro	2–0	Tianjin Jinmen Tiger	Dalian, Liaoning
15:30 (UTC+08:00)	Dong Yanfeng (yellow card) 45'; Tao Qianglong 54' (yellow card) 56'; Wu Wei 67'; Kudirat (yellow card) 78'; Cui Ming'an (yellow card) 80'	Report	Piao Taoyu (yellow card) 39'	Stadium: Dalian Pro Football Academy Base; Referee: Ma Li; Assistant referees: Ma Qiang, Wang Xihong; Fourth official: Chen Jindong

==== Quarter finals ====
24 October 2021 1st leg	Dalian Pro	0–3	Shanghai Port	Dalian, Liaoning
19:30 (UTC+08:00)	Zheng Long (yellow card) 20'; Sun Guowen (yellow card) 45+1'	Report	Lü Wenjun 26' (pen.); Li Shenyuan 55'; Liu Zhurun 81'	Stadium: Dalian Pro Football Academy Base; Referee: Dai Yege; Assistant referees: Ma Ji, Li Xingfeng; Fourth official: Jia Zhiliang

29 October 2021 2nd leg	Shanghai Port	0–0 (3–0 agg.)	Dalian Pro	Dalian, Liaoning
19:30(UTC+08:00)		Report	Dong Yanfeng (yellow card) 27'; Wan Yu (yellow card) 27'	Stadium: Dalian Pro Football Academy Base; Referee: Jia Zhiliang; Assistant referees: Wang Xihong, Tangchao; Fourth official: Li Xingfeng

== Squad statistics ==
=== Appearances and goals ===
No.	Pos.	Player	Nat.	Super League			FA Cup			Season Total			Playoff		
No.	Pos.	Player	Nat.	App.	Starts	Goals	App.	Starts	Goals	App.	Starts	Goals	App.	Starts	Goals
1	GK	Zhang Chong	(China)	19	19	0	0	0	0	19	19	0	2	2	0
2	DF	Yang Lei	(China)	0	0	0	0	0	0	0	0	0	0	0	0
3	DF	Shan Pengfei	(China)	12	12	0	1	1	0	13	13	0	0	0	0
4	DF	Li Shuai	(China)	16	15	0	0	0	0	16	15	0	2	2	0
5	MF	Wu Wei	(China)	17	16	0	3	3	1	20	19	1	0	0	0
7	MF	Zhao Xuri	(China)	18	13	1	1	1	0	19	14	1	2	2	0
9	FW	Shan Huanhuan	(China)	15	8	2	3	2	0	17	10	2	2	2	0
10	MF	Sam Larsson	(Sweden)	8	6	3	0	0	0	8	6	3	2	2	0
11	DF	Sun Guowen	(China)	20	18	0	3	3	0	23	21	0	1	1	1
12	GK	Xu Jiamin	(China)	3	3	0	2	1	0	5	4	0	0	0	0
13	DF	Wang Yaopeng	(China)	12	11	0	2	2	0	14	13	0	1	0	0
14	DF	Huang Jiahui	(China)	11	7	1	4	2	0	15	9	1	2	2	0
15	FW	Zhao Jianbo	(China)	8	6	0	4	2	0	12	8	0	1	0	0
16	DF	Tong Lei	(China)	19	18	0	4	2	0	23	20	0	2	2	0
17	FW	Zhang Jiansheng	(China)	0	0	0	0	0	0	0	0	0	0	0	0
18	DF	He Yupeng	(China)	10	4	0	2	1	0	12	5	0	0	0	0
20	MF	Wang Jinxian	(China)	6	3	0	4	1	1	10	4	1	2	1	0
21	FW	Emmanuel Boateng	(Ghana)	13	7	4	0	0	0	13	7	4	0	0	0
22	DF	Dong Yanfeng	(China)	19	19	0	4	4	0	23	23	0	2	2	0
23	GK	Li Xuebo	(China)	0	0	0	0	0	0	0	0	0	0	0	0
24	FW	Tao Qianglong	(China)	14	7	2	4	3	1	18	10	3	2	2	0
25	MF	Jailson Siqueira	(Brazil)	0	0	0	0	0	0	0	0	0	0	0	0
26	MF	Cui Ming'an	(China)	18	11	0	4	2	0	22	13	0	1	0	0
27	MF	Yang Pengju	(China)	0	0	0	0	0	0	0	0	0	0	0	0
28	MF	Lin Liangming	(China)	13	11	5	3	2	1	16	13	6	0	0	0
29	MF	Sun Bo	(China)	10	0	0	0	0	0	10	0	0	0	0	0
30	DF	Marcus Danielson	(Sweden)	10	10	2	0	0	0	10	10	2	2	2	0
31	MF	Zheng Long	(China)	15	9	1	3	3	0	18	12	1	0	0	0
32	GK	Kudirat Ablet	(China)	0	0	0	3	3	0	3	3	0	0	0	0
33	DF	Wang Xianjun	(China)	4	1	0	3	2	0	7	3	0	0	0	0
34	MF	Wang Zhen'ao	(China)	11	8	0	2	1	0	13	9	0	0	0	0
36	GK	Wang Jinshuai	(China)	0	0	0	0	0	0	0	0	0	0	0	0
37	DF	Yang Haoyu	(China)	3	0	0	1	1	0	4	1	0	0	0	0
38	MF	Kong Yinquan	(China)	0	0	0	0	0	0	0	0	0	0	0	0
39	MF	Wang Tengda	(China)	0	0	0	1	0	0	1	0	0	0	0	0
40	MF	Zhu Jiaxuan	(China)	5	0	0	1	1	0	6	1	0	0	0	0
62	DF	Wan Yu	(China)	0	0	0	1	1	0	1	1	0	0	0	0
66	MF	Wang Yu	(China)	2	0	0	1	0	0	3	0	0	0	0	0
TOTALS						21			4			25			1

=== Goalscorers ===
Rank	Player	Super League	FA Cup	Season Total	Playoff
1	Lin Liangming	5	1	6	0
2	Emmanuel Boateng	4 (2)	0	4	0
3	Sam Larsson	3	0	3	0
3	Tao Qianglong	2	1	3	0
5	Marcus Danielson	2 (1)	0	2	0
5	Shan Huanhuan	2	0	2	0
7	Huang Jiahui	1	0	1	0
7	Wang Jinxian	0	1	1	0
7	Wu Wei	0	1	1	0
7	Zhao Xuri	1	0	1	0
7	Zheng Long	1	0	1	0
7	Sun Guowen	0	0	0	1
TOTALS		21	4	25	1

Last updated: 11 January 2022.
Source: Results

=== Disciplinary record ===
No.	Pos.	Player	Super League			FA Cup			Season Total			Playoff		
No.	Pos.	Player	Yellow card	(yellow card) (yellow-red card)	Red card	Yellow card	(yellow card) (yellow-red card)	Red card	Yellow card	(yellow card) (yellow-red card)	Red card	Yellow card	(yellow card) (yellow-red card)	Red card
1	GK	Zhang Chong	1	0	0	0	0	0	1	0	0	0	0	0
2	DF	Yang Lei	0	0	0	0	0	0	0	0	0	0	0	0
3	DF	Shan Pengfei	3	0	0	0	0	0	3	0	0	0	0	0
4	DF	Li Shuai	3	0	0	0	0	0	3	0	0	1	0	0
5	MF	Wu Wei	8	0	0	0	0	0	8	0	0	0	0	0
7	MF	Zhao Xuri	5	0	0	0	0	0	5	0	0	0	0	0
9	FW	Shan Huanhuan	1	0	0	0	0	0	1	0	0	0	0	0
10	MF	Sam Larsson	1	0	0	0	0	0	1	0	0	0	0	0
11	DF	Sun Guowen	2	0	0	2	0	0	5	1	0	1	1	0
12	GK	Xu Jiamin	0	0	0	0	0	0	0	0	0	0	0	0
13	DF	Wang Yaopeng	2	0	0	0	0	0	2	0	0	0	0	0
14	DF	Huang Jiahui	2	0	0	0	0	0	2	0	0	0	0	0
15	FW	Zhao Jianbo	0	0	0	0	0	0	0	0	0	0	0	0
16	DF	Tong Lei	5	1	0	0	0	0	5	1	0	0	0	0
17	FW	Zhang Jiansheng	0	0	0	0	0	0	0	0	0	0	0	0
18	DF	He Yupeng	2	0	0	0	0	0	2	0	0	0	0	0
20	MF	Wang Jinxian	0	0	0	0	0	0	1	0	0	1	0	0
21	FW	Emmanuel Boateng	1	0	0	0	0	0	1	0	0	0	0	0
22	DF	Dong Yanfeng	3	0	1	2	0	0	5	0	1	0	0	0
23	GK	Li Xuebo	0	0	0	0	0	0	0	0	0	0	0	0
24	FW	Tao Qianglong	1	0	0	1	0	0	2	0	0	0	0	0
25	MF	Jailson Siqueira	0	0	0	0	0	0	0	0	0	0	0	0
26	MF	Cui Ming'an	1	0	0	1	0	0	2	0	0	0	0	0
27	MF	Yang Pengju	0	0	0	0	0	0	0	0	0	0	0	0
28	MF	Lin Liangming	0	0	0	0	0	0	0	0	0	0	0	0
29	MF	Sun Bo	2	0	0	0	0	0	2	0	0	0	0	0
30	DF	Marcus Danielson	0	0	0	0	0	0	0	0	0	0	0	0
31	MF	Zheng Long	2	0	0	1	0	0	3	0	0	0	0	0
32	GK	Kudirat Ablet	0	0	0	1	0	0	1	0	0	0	0	0
33	DF	Wang Xianjun	1	0	0	0	0	0	1	0	0	0	0	0
34	MF	Wang Zhen'ao	0	0	0	0	0	0	0	0	0	0	0	0
36	GK	Wang Jinshuai	0	0	0	0	0	0	0	0	0	0	0	0
37	DF	Yang Haoyu	1	0	0	0	0	0	1	0	0	0	0	0
38	MF	Kong Yinquan	0	0	0	0	0	0	0	0	0	0	0	0
39	MF	Wang Tengda	0	0	0	0	0	0	0	0	0	0	0	0
40	MF	Zhu Jiaxuan	0	0	0	0	0	0	0	0	0	0	0	0
62	DF	Wan Yu	0	0	0	1	0	0	1	0	0	0	0	0
66	MF	Wang Yu	0	0	0	0	0	0	0	0	0	0	0	0
TOTALS			47	1	1	9	0	0	58	2	1	3	1	0

=== Suspensions ===
Player	Length	Reason	Date(s) served	Opponent	Ref.
Tong Lei	1 match	Red card vs. Beijing Guoan	11 May 2021	Tianjin Jinmen Tiger	
Dong Yanfeng	1 match	Red card vs. Hebei	31 July 2021	Beijing Guoan	
Wu Wei	1 match	4 Yellow cards accumulated	6 August 2021	Shanghai Port	
Zhao Xuri	1 match	4 Yellow cards accumulated	21 December 2021	Qingdao	
Wu Wei	1 match	4 Yellow cards accumulated	25 December 2021	Henan Songshan Longmen	
Tong Lei	1 match	4 Yellow cards accumulated	3 January 2022	Qingdao	
Sun Guowen	1 match	Red card vs. Chengdu Rongcheng	12 January 2022	Chengdu Rongcheng	
Zheng Long	6 matches	Interfering ongoing match from outside the pitch, scolding referee during the match vs. Chengdu Rongcheng	-	-	
Yang Haoyu	12 months	Punching referee in the face after the match vs. Chengdu Rongcheng	-	-	
