= Ablet =

Ablet (Chinese: 阿布来提 or 阿不来提) can be both a given name and a surname. Notable people with the name include:

- Ablet Abdureshit, Chinese politician
- Abduwali Ablet (born 1987), Chinese football left-back
- Kudirat Ablet (born 1997), Chinese football goalkeeper
