= Yang Haoyu =

Yang Haoyu may refer to:

- Yang Haoyu (footballer, born 2000), Chinese footballer
- Yang Haoyu (footballer, born 2006), Chinese footballer
