= Kudirat =

Kudirat is a given name. Notable people with the name include:

- Kudirat Abiola (1951–1996), Nigerian assassination victim
- Kudirat Ablet (born 1997), Chinese footballer
- Kudirat Akhigbe (born 1981), Nigerian sprinter
- Kudirat Kekere-Ekun (born 1958), Justice of the Supreme Court of Nigeria
