= 2018–19 Fenerbahçe S.K. season =

Fenerbahçe
2018–19 season
- President: Ali Koç
- Head coach: Phillip Cocu (until 28 October 2018); Erwin Koeman (caretaker) (from 28 October 2018 to 14 December 2018); Ersun Yanal (from 14 December 2018)
- Stadium: Şükrü Saracoğlu Stadium
- Süper Lig: 6th
- Turkish Cup: Round of 16
- UEFA Champions League: Third qualifying round
- UEFA Europa League: Round of 32
- Top goalscorer: League: Roberto Soldado (6 goals); All: Roberto Soldado (7 goals)
- Highest home attendance: 44,612 vs. Galatasaray (14 April 2019, Süper Lig)
- Lowest home attendance: 24,776 vs. Dinamo Zagreb (29 November 2018, UEL)
Home colours	Away colours	Third colours

The 2018–19 season was the 112th season in the existence of Fenerbahçe S.K. and the club's 61st consecutive season in the top flight of Turkish football. In addition to the domestic league, Fenerbahçe participated in this season's editions of the Turkish Cup, the UEFA Champions League and the UEFA Europa League.

== Players ==
=== First-team squad ===
N	Pos.	Nat.	Name	Age	EU	Since	App	Goals	Ends	Transfer fee	Notes
1	GK	(Turkey)	Volkan Demirel (Captain)	37	Non-EU	2002	507	0	2019	Free	
3	DF	(Turkey)	Hasan Ali Kaldırım	29	EU	2012	226	8	2020	€3.75M	Second nationality: German
4	DF	(Chile)	Mauricio Isla	30	Non-EU	2017	66	0	2020	Free	
5	MF	(Turkey)	Mehmet Topal (Vice-Captain)	33	Non-EU	2012	297	24	2020	€4.50M	
6	DF	(Turkey)	İsmail Köybaşı	29	Non-EU	2017	59	2	2019	Free	
7	MF	(Turkey)	Alper Potuk	28	Non-EU	2013	206	17	2022	€7.50M	
8	FW	(Nigeria)	Victor Moses	28	Non-EU	2019 (Winter)	16	4	2020	Free	
9	FW	(Spain)	Roberto Soldado	33	EU	2017	59	19	2019	€5.00M	
11	MF	(Turkey)	Mehmet Ekici	29	EU	2017	36	5	2020	Free	Second nationality: German
13	GK	(Cameroon)	Carlos Kameni	35	EU	2017	16	0	2020	Free	Second nationality: French
15	DF	(Turkey)	Serdar Aziz	28	Non-EU	2019 (Winter)	10	1	2022	Free	
16	MF	(Netherlands)	Ferdi Kadıoğlu	19	EU	2018	1	0	2022	€1.40M	Second nationality: Turkish
17	MF	(Morocco)	Nabil Dirar	33	EU	2017	56	6	2020	€2.00M	Second nationality: Belgian
18	MF	(Germany)	Tolgay Arslan	28	EU	2019 (Winter)	12	0	2022	€3.00M	Second nationality: Turkish
19	DF	(Turkey)	Şener Özbayraklı	29	Non-EU	2015	110	5	2019	€1.63M	
20	MF	(Ghana)	André Ayew	29	EU	2018	38	5	2019	€1.50M	Second nationality: French
21	MF	(Slovenia)	Miha Zajc	24	EU	2019 (Winter)	10	2	2023	€3.50M	
22	FW	(Switzerland)	Michael Frey	24	Non-EU	2018	22	5	2022	€2.64M	
25	GK	(Turkey)	Berke Özer	19	Non-EU	2018	1	0	2023	€2.50M	
26	MF	(Turkey)	Tolga Ciğerci	27	EU	2018	0	0	2019	Free	Second nationality: German
28	MF	(France)	Mathieu Valbuena	34	EU	2017	71	12	2019	€1.50M	
31	FW	(Algeria)	Islam Slimani	30	Non-EU	2018	25	5	2019	Free	
32	MF	(Brazil)	Jailson	23	Non-EU	2018	28	2	2022	€4.00M	
33	DF	(Russia)	Roman Neustädter	31	EU	2016	108	7	2019	Free	Second nationality: German
35	GK	(Turkey)	Harun Tekin	29	Non-EU	2018	31	0	2021	€2.50M	
37	DF	(Slovakia)	Martin Škrtel	34	EU	2016	119	7	2019	€6.00M	
39	MF	(Algeria)	Yassine Benzia	24	EU	2018	20	0	2019	Free	Second nationality: French
44	DF	(Turkey)	Sadık Çiftpınar	26	Non-EU	2019 (Winter)	13	1	2022	Free	
54	GK	(Turkey)	Erten Ersu	25	Non-EU	2013	4	0	2019	Youth system	
55	DF	(Turkey)	Oğuz Kağan Güçtekin	20	Non-EU	2017	16	0	2020	Youth system	
80	MF	(Turkey)	Serhat Kot	21	EU	2017	0	0	2020	Free	Second nationality: German
99	MF	(North Macedonia)	Eljif Elmas	19	Non-EU	2017	47	4	2022	€0.18M	
Players sold or loaned out after the start of the season
8	MF	(Turkey)	Ozan Tufan	23	Non-EU	2015	98	9	2020	€7.00M	
10	MF	(Brazil)	Giuliano	28	Non-EU	2017	37	16	2021	€7.00M	
15	MF	(Turkey)	Uygar Mert Zeybek	23	Non-EU	2015	19	1	2020	Youth system	
23	DF	(Mexico)	Diego Reyes	26	Non-EU	2018	14	1	2021	Free	
24	MF	(Turkey)	Barış Alıcı	21	Non-EU	2018	15	0	2023	€1.50M	
53	DF	(Turkey)	Yiğithan Güveli	20	Non-EU	2016	12	1	2019	Youth system	
89	MF	(Brazil)	Souza	29	Non-EU	2015	136	16	2019	€8.00M	
92	MF	(Morocco)	Aatif Chahechouhe	32	EU	2016	70	14	2019	Free	Second nationality: French

- Last updated: 26 May 2019
- Source: Fenerbahce.org
- Ordered by squad number.

== Transfers ==
=== In ===
No.	Pos.	Nat.	Name	Age	Moving from	Type	Transfer window	Ends	Transfer fee	Source
	FW	(Turkey)	Beykan Şimşek	23	Sakaryaspor	End of loan	Summer	2019	Free	
23	FW	(Turkey)	Ahmethan Köse	21	Boluspor	End of loan	Summer	2020	Free	
48	MF	(Turkey)	Salih Uçan	24	(Switzerland) Sion	End of loan	Summer	2019	Free	
24	MF	(Turkey)	Barış Alıcı	21	Altınordu	Transfer	Summer	2023	€1.50M	Fenerbahce.org
25	GK	(Turkey)	Berke Özer	18	Altınordu	Transfer	Summer	2023	€2.50M	Fenerbahce.org
16	MF	(Netherlands)	Ferdi Kadıoğlu	18	(Netherlands) NEC	Transfer	Summer	2022	€1.40M	Fenerbahce.org
20	MF	(Ghana)	André Ayew	28	(England) Swansea City	Loan	Summer	2019	Free	Fenerbahce.org
31	FW	(Algeria)	Islam Slimani	30	(England) Leicester City	Loan	Summer	2019	€1.50M	Fenerbahce.org
22	FW	(Switzerland)	Michael Frey	24	(Switzerland) FC Zürich	Transfer	Summer	2022	€2.64M	Fenerbahce.org
23	DF	(Mexico)	Diego Reyes	25	(Portugal) FC Porto	Transfer	Summer	2021	Free	Fenerbahce.org
35	GK	(Turkey)	Harun Tekin	29	Bursaspor	Transfer	Summer	2021	€2.50M	Fenerbahce.org
32	MF	(Brazil)	Jailson	22	(Brazil) Grêmio	Transfer	Summer	2022	€4.00M	Fenerbahce.org
26	MF	(Turkey)	Tolga Ciğerci	26	Galatasaray	Transfer	Summer	2019	Free	Fenerbahce.org
39	MF	(Algeria)	Yassine Benzia	23	(France) Lille	Loan	Summer	2019	Free	Fenerbahce.org
44	DF	(Turkey)	Sadık Çiftpınar	26	Yeni Malatyaspor	Transfer	Winter	2022	€750K+Exc.	Fenerbahce.org
8	FW	(Nigeria)	Victor Moses	28	(England) Chelsea	Loan	Winter	2020	Free	Fenerbahce.org
15	DF	(Turkey)	Serdar Aziz	28	Galatasaray	Transfer	Winter	2022	Free	Fenerbahce.org
18	MF	(Germany)	Tolgay Arslan	28	Beşiktaş	Transfer	Winter	2022	€3.00M	Fenerbahce.org
21	MF	(Slovenia)	Miha Zajc	24	(Italy) Empoli	Transfer	Winter	2023	€3.50M+Exc.	Fenerbahce.org

=== Out ===
No.	Pos.	Nat.	Name	Age	Moving to	Type	Transfer window	Transfer fee	Source
14	DF	(Portugal)	Luís Neto	30	(Russia) Zenit	End of loan	Summer	Free	
23	FW	(Netherlands)	Vincent Janssen	24	(England) Tottenham Hotspur	End of loan	Summer	Free	
9	FW	(Brazil)	Fernandão	30	(Saudi Arabia) Al-Wehda	Transfer	Summer	$3M	Fenerbahce.org
	FW	(Turkey)	Beykan Şimşek	23	Osmanlıspor	Transfer	Summer	Undisclosed	
23	FW	(Turkey)	Ahmethan Köse	21	Kırklarelispor	Loan	Summer	Free	
48	MF	(Turkey)	Salih Uçan	24	(Italy) Empoli	Loan	Summer	Free	Empolicalcio.net
10	MF	(Brazil)	Giuliano	28	(Saudi Arabia) Al-Nassr	Transfer	Summer	€10.50M	Fenerbahce.org
60	MF	(Turkey)	Samed Karakoç	21	Tarsus İdman Yurdu	Loan	Summer	Free	Tarsusidmanyurdu.org.tr
89	MF	(Brazil)	Souza	29	(Saudi Arabia) Al-Ahli	Transfer	Summer	€12M	Fenerbahce.org
8	MF	(Turkey)	Ozan Tufan	23	Alanyaspor	Loan	Winter	Free	Fenerbahce.org
53	MF	(Turkey)	Yiğithan Güveli	20	Yeni Malatyaspor	Transfer	Winter	Free	
24	DF	(Turkey)	Barış Alıcı	21	Yeni Malatyaspor	Loan	Winter	Free	
92	MF	(Morocco)	Aatif Chahechouhe	32	Çaykur Rizespor	Transfer	Winter	Free	
23	DF	(Mexico)	Diego Reyes	26	(Spain) Leganés	Loan	Winter	Free	
15	MF	(Turkey)	Uygar Mert Zeybek	23	İstanbulspor	Transfer	Winter	Free	
48	MF	(Turkey)	Salih Uçan	25	(Italy) Empoli	Transfer	Winter	€1.00M+Exc.	Fenerbahce.org

Total spending: ▼€16.04M
Total income: ▲$3M – €22.50M
Expenditure: ▲$3M
▲€6.46M

== Pre-season and friendlies ==
Win Draw Loss

=== Pre-season ===
7 July 2018 Friendly	İstanbulspor	1–1	Fenerbahçe	Istanbul
19:00 TRT (UTC+3)	Yılmaz 75'	Report	Chahechouhe 43'	Stadium: Necmi Kadıoğlu Stadium

14 July 2018 Friendly	Lausanne (Switzerland)	2–1	(Turkey) Fenerbahçe	Lausanne, Switzerland
19:00 CEST (UTC+2)	Kololli 74', 77'	Report	Güveli 83'	Stadium: Stade Olympique de la Pontaise

18 July 2018 Friendly	Fulham (England)	0–3	(Turkey) Fenerbahçe	Évian-les-Bains, France
17:00 CEST (UTC+2)		Report	Giuliano 28'; Kaldırım 42'; Tufan 75'	Stadium: Camille Fournier Stadium

21 July 2018 Friendly	Fenerbahçe (Turkey)	3–3	(Netherlands) Feyenoord	Istanbul
21:00 TRT (UTC+3)	Elmas 7'; Giuliano 14' (pen.); Valbuena 18'	Report	Berghuis 87', 95' (pen.); Toornstra 90'	Stadium: Şükrü Saracoğlu Stadium

27 July 2018 Friendly	Altınordu	1–1	Fenerbahçe	İzmir
21:00 TRT (UTC+3)	Mert 73'	Report	Uçar 63' (o.g.)	Stadium: Bornova Stadium; Referee: Hakan Ceylan

1 August 2018 Friendly	Fenerbahçe (Turkey)	2–1	(Italy) Cagliari	Istanbul
21:00 TRT (UTC+3)	Potuk 51', 57'	Report	Sau 68'	Stadium: Şükrü Saracoğlu Stadium

=== Mid-season ===
11 October 2018 Friendly	Fenerbahçe	3–0	İstanbulspor	Istanbul
13:30	Ekici 68'; Soldado 71'; Frey 82'	Report		Stadium: Fenerbahçe Lefter Küçükandonyadis Tesisleri

11 January 2019 Friendly	Fenerbahçe (Turkey)	3–2	(Netherlands) AZ	Antalya
18:00	Köybaşı 6'; Ekici 54'; Frey 83'	Report	Seuntjens 51', 74'	Stadium: Calista Sports Center

28 March 2019 Friendly	Fenerbahçe	4–0	Eskişehirspor	Istanbul
18:00	Jailson 34'; Soldado 55'; Köybaşı 69', 75'	Report		Stadium: Fenerbahçe Can Bartu Tesisleri

== Competitions ==
=== Overview ===
Competition	First match	Last match	Starting round	Final position	Record							
Competition	First match	Last match	Starting round	Final position	Pld	W	D	L	GF	GA	GD	Win %
Süper Lig	11 August 2018	26 May 2019	Matchday 1	6th	34	11	13	10	44	44	+0	32.35
Turkish Cup	6 December 2018	24 January 2019	Fifth round	Round of 16	4	2	0	2	6	4	+2	50.00
UEFA Champions League	7 August 2018	14 August 2018	Third qualifying round	Third qualifying round	2	0	1	1	1	2	−1	0.00
UEFA Europa League	20 September 2018	21 February 2019	Group stage	Round of 32	8	3	2	3	9	10	−1	37.50
Total					48	16	16	16	60	60	+0	33.33

Last updated: 26 May 2019.
Source: Competitions

=== Süper Lig ===
==== League table ====
Pos	Team	Pld	W	D	L	GF	GA	GD	Pts	Qualification or relegation
4	Trabzonspor	34	18	9	7	64	46	+18	63	Qualification for the Europa League third qualifying round
5	Yeni Malatyaspor	34	13	8	13	47	46	+1	47	Qualification for the Europa League second qualifying round
6	Fenerbahçe	34	11	13	10	44	44	0	46	
7	Antalyaspor	34	13	6	15	39	55	−16	45	
8	Konyaspor	34	9	17	8	40	38	+2	44 (Note: Konyaspor finished ahead of Alanyaspor on head-to-head points: Konyaspor 2–0 Alanyaspor, Alanyaspor 2–4 Konyaspor.)	

Source: Süper Lig, Soccerway
Rules for classification: 1) Points; 2) Head-to-head points; 3) Head-to-head goal difference; 4) Head-to-head goals scored; 5) Goal difference; 6) Goals scored; 7) Play-off.

==== Results summary ====
Overall								Home						Away					
Pld	W	D	L	GF	GA	GD	Pts	W	D	L	GF	GA	GD	W	D	L	GF	GA	GD
34	11	13	10	44	44	0	46	8	7	2	30	22	+8	3	6	8	14	22	−8

Last updated: 26 May 2019.
Source: TFF.org

Pld = Matches played; W = Matches won; D = Matches drawn; L = Matches lost; GF = Goals for; GA = Goals against; GD = Goal difference; Pts = Points

==== Results by round ====
Round	1	2	3	4	5	6	7	8	9	10	11	12	13	14	15	16	17	18	19	20	21	22	23	24	25	26	27	28	29	30	31	32	33	34
Ground	H	A	A	H	A	H	A	H	A	H	A	H	A	H	A	H	A	A	H	H	A	H	A	H	A	H	A	H	A	H	A	H	A	H
Result	W	L	L	L	W	D	L	D	D	L	D	W	L	D	L	D	D	D	W	W	L	D	D	W	L	W	D	D	L	D	W	W	W	W
Position	8	10	11	13	11	13	14	15	15	15	15	13	15	15	17	17	17	15	14	12	14	15	14	14	14	13	13	14	14	14	12	10	8	6

Updated to match(es) played on 26 May 2019. Source: TFF.org
A = Away; H = Home; W = Win; D = Draw; L = Loss

==== Matches ====
Win Draw Loss

11 August 2018 1	Fenerbahçe	2–1	Bursaspor	Istanbul
21:45 TRT (UTC+3)	Giuliano 22' (pen.); Škrtel (yellow card) 24'; Souza 30'; Dirar (yellow card) 73'	Report	Troost-Ekong 16'; Allano (yellow card) 60'; Badji (yellow card) 83'; Behich (yellow card) 90'	Stadium: Şükrü Saracoğlu Stadium; Attendance: 39,920; Referee: Halil Umut Meler; Assistant referees: Mustafa Emre Eyisoy, Cevdet Kömürcüoğlu; Fourth official: Bahattin Şimşek

18 August 2018 2	Yeni Malatyaspor	1–0	Fenerbahçe	Malatya
21:45 TRT (UTC+3)	Aleksić 70', (yellow card) 71'; Donald (yellow card) 90'	Report		Stadium: Malatya Stadium; Attendance: 14,440; Referee: Fırat Aydınus; Assistant referees: Serkan Ok, Aleks Taşcıoğlu; Fourth official: Koray Gençerler

25 August 2018 3	Göztepe	1–0	Fenerbahçe	İzmir
21:45 TRT (UTC+3)	Akbunar 66'; Poko (yellow card) 82'; Wallace (yellow card) 90'	Report	Slimani (yellow card) 50'	Stadium: Bornova Stadium; Referee: Cüneyt Çakır; Assistant referees: Bahattin Duran, Tarık Ongun; Fourth official: Serkan Çınar

1 September 2018 4	Fenerbahçe	2–3	Kayserispor	Istanbul
19:15 TRT (UTC+3)	Ayew 13', (yellow card) 15'; Slimani (yellow card) 18', (goal) 57'; Kaldırım (yellow card) 38'; Elmas (yellow card) 51'	Report	Başaçıkoğlu (yellow card) 11'; Mensah 52'; Škrtel 61' (o.g.); Bulut (yellow card) 65'; Chery 69'; Çinaz (red card) 82'	Stadium: Şükrü Saracoğlu Stadium; Attendance: 35,147; Referee: Ümit Öztürk; Assistant referees: Ali Saygın Ögel, Osman Gökhan Bilir; Fourth official: Mustafa Öğretmenoğlu

16 September 2018 5	Konyaspor	0–1	Fenerbahçe	Konya
20:00 TRT (UTC+3)	Demirok (yellow card) 30'; Jevtović (yellow card) 57'; Yatabaré (yellow card) 90'	Report	Elmas 67'; Tekin (yellow card) 83'	Stadium: Konya Büyükşehir Stadium; Referee: Ali Palabıyık; Assistant referees: Kemal Yılmaz, Serkan Olguncan; Fourth official: Koray Gençerler

24 September 2018 6	Fenerbahçe	1–1	Beşiktaş	Istanbul
21:00 TRT (UTC+3)	Reyes (yellow card) 59'; Ayew 71'	Report	Babel 40'; Arslan (yellow card) 63'; Özyakup (yellow card) 64'; Quaresma (yellow card) 84'; Erkin (yellow card) 87' (yellow-red card) 90'	Stadium: Şükrü Saracoğlu Stadium; Referee: Fırat Aydınus; Assistant referees: Serkan Ok, Aleks Taşçıoğlu; Fourth official: Alper Ulusoy

30 September 2018 7	Çaykur Rizespor	3–0	Fenerbahçe	Rize
19:00 TRT (UTC+3)	Saâdane (yellow card) 20'; Muriqi 30'; Umar 35'; Samudio 41'	Report	Benzia (yellow card) 57'	Stadium: Çaykur Didi Stadium; Referee: Cüneyt Çakır; Assistant referees: Bahattin Duran, Tarık Ongun; Fourth official: Serkan Çınar

7 October 2018 8	Fenerbahçe	0–0	İstanbul Başakşehir	Istanbul
18:00 TRT (UTC+3)	Reyes (yellow card) 34'; Neustädter (yellow card) 38'; Soldado (yellow card) 83'; Isla (yellow card) 87'; Kaldırım (yellow card) 87'	Report	Da Costa (yellow card) 41'; Kahveci (yellow card) 58'; Epureanu (yellow card) 60'; Elia (yellow card) 65'	Stadium: Şükrü Saracoğlu Stadium; Attendance: 35,739; Referee: Ali Palabıyık; Assistant referees: Serkan Olguncan, Serkan Çimen; Fourth official: Yaşar Kemal Uğurlu

20 October 2018 9	Sivasspor	0–0	Fenerbahçe	Sivas
19:00 TRT (UTC+3)	Robinho (yellow card) 19'; Kılınç (yellow card) 90+3'	Report	Köybaşı (yellow card) 60'	Stadium: New Sivas 4 Eylül Stadium; Referee: Halis Özkahya; Assistant referees: Kemal Yılmaz, Hakan Yemişken; Fourth official: Serkan Çınar

28 October 2018 10	Fenerbahçe	1–3	Ankaragücü	Istanbul
20:30 TRT (UTC+3)	Kaldırım (yellow card) 29'; Köybaşı (yellow card) 41'; Škrtel (yellow card) 48'; Slimani (yellow card) 71' (yellow-red card) 71'; Benzia (yellow card) 73'; Frey 89'	Report	Faty 35', (yellow card) 72'; Bifouma (yellow card) 54'; Özer (yellow card) 64'; El Kabir (yellow card) 72', (goal) 77'; Özgenç 74' (pen.), (yellow card) 75'; Kanatsizkus (yellow card) 84'	Stadium: Şükrü Saracoğlu Stadium; Attendance: 33,524; Referee: Hüseyin Göçek; Assistant referees: Mustafa Emre Eyisoy, Esat Sancaktar; Fourth official: Suat Arslanboğa

2 November 2018 11	Galatasaray	2–2	Fenerbahçe	Istanbul
21:00 TRT (UTC+3)	Donk 31'; Linnes 49'; Gümüş (yellow card) 61'; Ndiaye (red card) ME'; Belhanda (yellow card) ME'	Report	Neustädter (yellow card) 23'; Elmas (yellow card) 33'; Potuk (yellow card) 58'; Isla (yellow card) 66'; Valbuena 66' (pen.); Jailson 72', (red card) ME'; Soldado (red card) ME'	Stadium: Türk Telekom Stadium; Attendance: 49,929; Referee: Fırat Aydınus; Assistant referees: Serkan Ok, Aleks Taşçıoğlu; Fourth official: Özgür Yankaya

11 November 2018 12	Fenerbahçe	2–0	Alanyaspor	Istanbul
18:00 TRT (UTC+3)	Ayew 19'; Frey 31'; Köybaşı (yellow card) 57'; Topal (yellow card) 87'	Report	Gülselam (yellow card) 17'; Demiral (yellow card) 79'	Stadium: Şükrü Saracoğlu Stadium; Attendance: 31,303; Referee: Alper Ulusoy; Assistant referees: Mustafa Emre Eyisoy, Volkan Ahmet Narinç; Fourth official: Volkan Bayarslan

25 November 2018 13	Trabzonspor	2–1	Fenerbahçe	Trabzon
19:00 TRT (UTC+3)	Novák 50'; Sosa 75'; Onazi (yellow card) 87'; Pereira (yellow card) 90+2'; Çakır (yellow card) 90+4'	Report	Slimani (yellow card) 25'; Frey 82', (yellow card) 87'; Güveli (yellow card) 90+5'	Stadium: Medical Park Stadium; Referee: Halil Umut Meler; Assistant referees: İbrahim Çağlar Uyarcan, Cevdet Kömürcüoğlu; Fourth official: Koray Gençerler

3 December 2018 14	Fenerbahçe	2–2	Kasımpaşa	Istanbul
20:00 TRT (UTC+3)	Isla (yellow card) 7'; Neustädter 44'; Çek 45+2' (o.g.); Topal (yellow card) 53'; Elmas (yellow card) 80'	Report	Diagne 22', 55'; Serbest (yellow card) 26'	Stadium: Şükrü Saracoğlu Stadium; Attendance: 30,382; Referee: Yaşar Kemal Uğurlu; Assistant referees: Kemal Yılmaz, Erdinç Sezertam; Fourth official: Arda Kardeşler

9 December 2018 15	Akhisarspor	3–0	Fenerbahçe	Manisa
19:00 TRT (UTC+3)	Bokila 26'; Barbosa (yellow card) 33'; Josué (yellow card) 67'; Manu 82'; Regattin 90+5'	Report	Benzia (yellow card) 90+3'	Stadium: Spor Toto Akhisar Stadium; Referee: Bülent Yıldırım; Assistant referees: Asım Yusuf Öz, Mehmet Kısal; Fourth official: Volkan Bayarslan

17 December 2018 16	Fenerbahçe	2–2	BB Erzurumspor	Istanbul
20:00 TRT (UTC+3)	Ayew 18'; Škrtel 27'	Report	Gör (yellow card) 14'; Başsan 48'; Korkmaz (yellow card) 81'; Thy 90+4'	Stadium: Şükrü Saracoğlu Stadium; Attendance: 38,396; Referee: Fırat Aydınus; Assistant referees: Serkan Ok, Aleks Taşcıoğlu; Fourth official: Serkan Tokat

24 December 2018 17	Antalyaspor	0–0	Fenerbahçe	Antalya
20:00 TRT (UTC+3)	Kurtuluş (yellow card) 66'	Report	Ekici (yellow card) 32'; Neustädter (yellow card) 45+2' (yellow-red card) 75'	Stadium: Antalya Stadium; Attendance: 18,401; Referee: Ümit Öztürk; Assistant referees: Kemal Yılmaz, Osman Gökhan Bilir; Fourth official: Koray Gençerler

21 January 2019 18	Bursaspor	1–1	Fenerbahçe	Bursa
20:00 TRT (UTC+3)	Yardımcı (yellow card) 29'; Erdoğan (yellow card) 64'; Kara (yellow card) 81', (goal) 90'; Nayir (yellow card) 90+5'	Report	Soldado 20', (yellow card) 57'; Dirar (yellow card) 81'	Stadium: Bursa Büyükşehir Belediye Stadium; Attendance: 29,610; Referee: Cüneyt Çakır; Assistant referees: Bahattin Duran, Tarık Ongun; Fourth official: Abdulkadir Bitigen

28 January 2019 19	Fenerbahçe	3–2	Yeni Malatyaspor	Istanbul
20:00 TRT (UTC+3)	Ekici 2', 31', (yellow card) 45+4'; Soldado (yellow card) 22'; Topal (yellow card) 35', (goal) 86'; Kaldırım (yellow card) 50'; Çiftpınar (yellow card) 58'	Report	Büyük (yellow card) 4'; Guilherme (yellow card) 22'; Mina 28'; Kaş (yellow card) 45+4'; Donald 45+5'; Yalçın (yellow card) 90+4'	Stadium: Şükrü Saracoğlu Stadium; Attendance: 32,230; Referee: Ali Palabıyık; Assistant referees: Serkan Olguncan, Kerem Ersoy; Fourth official: Bahattin Şimşek

1 February 2019 20	Fenerbahçe	2–0	Göztepe	Istanbul
20:30 TRT (UTC+3)	Ayew 7', (yellow card) 37'; Neustädter (yellow card) 45+1'; Topal (yellow card) 65'; Moses 72'	Report	Akbunar (yellow card) 32'; Castro (yellow card) 33'; Jerome (red card) 50'; Öztekin (yellow card) 90+2'	Stadium: Şükrü Saracoğlu Stadium; Attendance: 37,890; Referee: Suat Arslanboğa; Assistant referees: Serkan Ok, İsmail Şencan; Fourth official: Volkan Bayarslan

8 February 2019 21	Kayserispor	1–0	Fenerbahçe	Kayseri
20:30 TRT (UTC+3)	Kucher (yellow card) 51'; Kravets 87'; Lung (yellow card) 90'	Report	Arslan (yellow card) 6' (yellow-red card) 90'; Isla (yellow card) 37'; Soldado (red card) 45'; Moses (yellow card) 52'; Frey (yellow card) 77'	Stadium: Kadir Has Stadium; Attendance: 16,408; Referee: Alper Ulusoy; Assistant referees: Mustafa Emre Eyisoy, Volkan Ahmet Narinç; Fourth official: Koray Gençerler

16 February 2019 22	Fenerbahçe	1–1	Konyaspor	Istanbul
19:00 TRT (UTC+3)	Škrtel (yellow card) 13'; Jailson 45'; Çiftpınar (yellow card) 74'; Potuk (yellow card) 90'	Report	Skubic (yellow card) 29'; Jahović (red card) 33'; Fofana 36'	Stadium: Şükrü Saracoğlu Stadium; Attendance: 39,230; Referee: Fırat Aydınus; Assistant referees: Serkan Ok, Aleks Taşçıoğlu; Fourth official: Arda Kardeşler

25 February 2019 23	Beşiktaş	3–3	Fenerbahçe	Istanbul
21:00 TRT (UTC+3)	Gönül 10'; Yılmaz 18' (pen.), 45', (yellow card) 74'; Uysal (yellow card) 60'	Report	Zajc (yellow card) 35', (goal) 55'; Dirar (yellow card) 60'; Çiftpınar 61', (yellow card) 76'; Kaldırım 67', (yellow card) 90+5'	Stadium: Vodafone Park; Attendance: 39,186; Referee: Bülent Yıldırım; Assistant referees: Mustafa Emre Eyisoy, Asım Yusuf; Fourth official: Serkan Tokat

2 March 2019 24	Fenerbahçe	3–2	Çaykur Rizespor	Istanbul
19:00 TRT (UTC+3)	Aziz 22'; Soldado 40'; Ayew (yellow card) 58'; Aziz (yellow card) 68'; Moses 84' (pen.)	Report	Melnjak 4', 55'; Morozyuk (yellow card) 20' (yellow-red card) 42'; Durak (yellow card) 80'; Saâdane (yellow card) 80'	Stadium: Şükrü Saracoğlu Stadium; Attendance: 37,311; Referee: Halil Umut Meler; Assistant referees: Ceyhun Sesigüzel, İbrahim Çağlar Uyarcan; Fourth official: Volkan Bayarslan

9 March 2019 25	İstanbul Başakşehir	2–1	Fenerbahçe	Istanbul
19:00 TRT (UTC+3)	Robinho 19', (yellow card) 79'; Napoleoni 83'; Belözoğlu (yellow card) 86'	Report	Arslan (yellow card) 41'; Aziz (yellow card) 69'; Soldado 73'	Stadium: Fatih Terim Stadium; Attendance: 9,345; Referee: Hüseyin Göçek; Assistant referees: Serkan Ok, Erdem Bayık; Fourth official: Serkan Tokat

15 March 2019 26	Fenerbahçe	2–1	Sivasspor	Istanbul
20:30 TRT (UTC+3)	Soldado 74'; Çiftpınar (yellow card) 82'; Ekici 86'; Tekin (yellow card) 90+4'; Moses (yellow card) 90+5'	Report	Bjärsmyr (yellow card) 18'; Hurmacı 73'; Yandaş (yellow card) 90'	Stadium: Şükrü Saracoğlu Stadium; Attendance: 32,500; Referee: Bülent Yıldırım; Assistant referees: Kemal Yılmaz, Asım Yusuf Öz; Fourth official: Koray Gençerler

7 April 2019 27	Ankaragücü	1–1	Fenerbahçe	Ankara
16:00 TRT (UTC+3)	Canteros (yellow card) 15' (red card) 90'; Boyd 42'; Pinto (yellow card) 68'; Moke (yellow card) 90'; Orgill (yellow card) 90'	Report	Aziz (yellow card) 5'; Isla (yellow card) 45'; Kaldırım 67'; Tekin (yellow card) 90'; Ekici (red card) 90'	Stadium: Eryaman Stadium; Attendance: 18,818; Referee: Mete Kalkavan; Assistant referees: Bahattin Duran, Mustafa Emre Eyisoy; Fourth official: Volkan Bayarslan

14 April 2019 28	Fenerbahçe	1–1	Galatasaray	Istanbul
19:00 TRT (UTC+3)	Topal (yellow card) 21'; Moses (yellow card) 35'; Kaldırım (red card) 45'; Valbuena (yellow card) 45'; Elmas 71'; Soldado (yellow card) 90'	Report	Belhanda (yellow card) 18'; Mariano (yellow card) 52'; Onyekuru 66', (yellow card) 70'; Gümüş (yellow card) 90'	Stadium: Şükrü Saracoğlu Stadium; Attendance: 44,612; Referee: Ali Palabıyık; Assistant referees: Kemal Yılmaz, Serkan Olguncan; Fourth official: Koray Gençerler

21 April 2019 29	Alanyaspor	1–0	Fenerbahçe	Alanya
19:00 TRT (UTC+3)	Karaca 57'	Report	Köybaşı (yellow card) 37'	Stadium: Bahçeşehir Okulları Stadium; Attendance: 7,084; Referee: Suat Arslanboğa; Assistant referees: Serkan Ok, İsmail Şencan; Fourth official: Özgür Yankaya

27 April 2019 30	Fenerbahçe	1–1	Trabzonspor	Istanbul
19:00 TRT (UTC+3)	Škrtel (yellow card) 21'; Soldado (yellow card) 30'; Kaldırım (yellow card) 57'; Çiftpınar (yellow card) 59' (yellow-red card) 71'; Valbuena 90'	Report	Yazıcı 16'; Türkmen (yellow card) 74'; Parmak (yellow card) 85'	Stadium: Şükrü Saracoğlu Stadium; Attendance: 38,943; Referee: Cüneyt Çakır; Assistant referees: Bahattin Duran, Tarık Ongun; Fourth official: Abdulkadir Bitigen

4 May 2019 31	Kasımpaşa	1–3	Fenerbahçe	Istanbul
19:00 TRT (UTC+3)	Tekin 13' (o.g.); Perica (yellow card) 25'; Pavelka (yellow card) 60'; Sarı (yellow card) 70'; Veigneau (yellow card) 83'; Sadiku (yellow card) 90'	Report	Elmas 20'; Valbuena 72'; Soldado 74'	Stadium: Recep Tayyip Erdoğan Stadium; Referee: Halis Özkahya; Assistant referees: Kemal Yılmaz, Aleks Taşçıoğlu; Fourth official: Süleyman Abay

11 May 2019 32	Fenerbahçe	2–1	Akhisarspor	Istanbul
19:00 TRT (UTC+3)	Soldado 28'; Dirar 30'; Aziz (yellow card) 75'; Elmas (yellow card) 79'; Jailson (yellow card) 80'	Report	Vural (yellow card) 39'; Barbosa 45'; Bokila (yellow card) 75'; Ataseven (yellow card) 78'	Stadium: Şükrü Saracoğlu Stadium; Referee: Abdulkadir Bitigen; Assistant referees: Mehmet Cem Satman, Mustafa Savranlar; Fourth official: Mert Güzenge

20 May 2019 33	BB Erzurumspor	0–1	Fenerbahçe	Erzurum
20:00 TRT (UTC+3)	Akdağ (yellow card) 11'; H. Arslan (yellow card) 43'; Šehić (yellow card) 58'; Ünlü (yellow card) 88'	Report	Valbuena (yellow card) 18'; T. Arslan (yellow card) 43'; Moses 59' (pen.); Škrtel (yellow card) 69'; Aziz (yellow card) 71'; Tekin (yellow card) 87'	Stadium: Kazım Karabekir Stadium; Referee: Suat Arslanboğa; Assistant referees: Serkan Ok, İsmail Şencan; Fourth official: Bülent Birincioğlu

26 May 2019 34	Fenerbahçe	3–1	Antalyaspor	Istanbul
19:00 TRT (UTC+3)	Zajc 13'; Jailson (yellow card) 50'; Elmas 69'; Moses 90'	Report	Sinik (yellow card) 29'; Erdinç 33'; Diego Ângelo (yellow card) 52'; Amilton (yellow card) 59'	Stadium: Şükrü Saracoğlu Stadium; Referee: Halis Özkahya; Assistant referees: Volkan Ahmet Narinç, Yusuf Bozdoğan; Fourth official: Hakan Ceylan

=== Turkish Cup ===
==== Fifth round ====
6 December 2018 First leg	Fenerbahçe	1–0	Giresunspor	Istanbul
20:30 TRT (UTC+3)	Elmas (yellow card) 74'; Slimani 80'; Özer (yellow card) 90+3'	Report	Atik (yellow card) 35'	Stadium: Şükrü Saracoğlu Stadium; Referee: Özgür Yankaya; Assistant referees: Alparslan Dedeş, Yusuf Bozdoğan; Fourth official: Erkan Engin

20 December 2018 Second leg	Giresunspor	2–5 (2–6 agg.)	Fenerbahçe	Giresun
20:30 TRT (UTC+3)	Id Azza 14'; Husmani (yellow card) 61'; Okumak 68' (pen.)	Report	Soldado 7'; Ekici 49', 55'; Topal 73'; Reyes 89'	Stadium: Giresun Atatürk Stadium; Referee: Suat Arslanboğa; Assistant referees: Erdem Bayık, Ata Yıldırım; Fourth official: Özgüç Türkalp

==== Round of 16 ====
17 January 2019 First leg	Ümraniyespor	1–0	Fenerbahçe	Istanbul
20:30 TRT (UTC+3)	Subaşı 82'; Dialiba (yellow card) 90+7'	Report	Slimani (yellow card) 23'; Elmas (red card) 47'	Stadium: Ümraniye Belediyesi Şehir; Referee: Arda Kardeşler; Assistant referees: Samet Çiçek, Mustafa Savranlar; Fourth official: Ali Şansalan

24 January 2019 Second leg	Fenerbahçe	0–1 (0–2 agg.)	Ümraniyespor	Istanbul
20:30 TRT (UTC+3)	Škrtel (red card) 64'	Report	Çiçek (yellow card) 60'; Subaşı (yellow card) 70'; Temeltaş (yellow card) 85'; Leandrinho 89'	Stadium: Şükrü Saracoğlu Stadium; Referee: Serkan Tokat; Assistant referees: Mehmet Cem Hanoğlu, Yusuf Bozdoğan; Fourth official: Ali Şansalan

=== UEFA Champions League ===
==== Third qualifying round ====
7 August 2018 First leg	Benfica (Portugal)	1–0	(Turkey) Fenerbahçe	Lisbon, Portugal
20:00 WEST (UTC+1)	Cervi 69'; Grimaldo (yellow card) 79'	Report	Soldado (yellow card) 78'; Ekici (yellow card) 82'; Elmas (yellow card) 90'	Stadium: Estádio da Luz; Attendance: 57,878; Referee: Aleksei Kulbakov (Belarus); Assistant referees: Dmitri Zhuk, Oleg Maslyanko; Fourth official: Denis Scherbakov

14 August 2018 Second leg	Fenerbahçe (Turkey)	1–1 (1–2 agg.)	(Portugal) Benfica	Istanbul
21:00 TRT (UTC+3)	Elmas (yellow card) 22'; Potuk 45'; Özbayraklı (yellow card) 90'	Report	Fernandes 26'; Vlachodimos (yellow card) 52'; Salvio (yellow card) 56'; Dias (yellow card) 62'; Pizzi (yellow card) 83'	Stadium: Şükrü Saracoğlu Stadium; Attendance: 42,245; Referee: Slavko Vinčić (Slovenia); Assistant referees: Tomaž Klančnik, Andraž Kovacic; Fourth official: Roberto Ponis

=== UEFA Europa League ===
==== Group stage ====
Pos	Team	Pld	W	D	L	GF	GA	GD	Pts	Qualification	DZG	FEN	SPT	AND
1	(Croatia) Dinamo Zagreb	6	4	2	0	11	3	+8	14	Advance to knockout phase	—	4–1	3–1	0–0
2	(Turkey) Fenerbahçe	6	2	2	2	7	7	0	8	Advance to knockout phase	0–0	—	2–0	2–0
3	(Slovakia) Spartak Trnava	6	2	1	3	4	7	−3	7		1–2	1–0	—	1–0
4	(Belgium) Anderlecht	6	0	3	3	2	7	−5	3		0–2	2–2	0–0	—

Source: UEFA
Rules for classification: Group stage tiebreakers

20 September 2018 1	Dinamo Zagreb (Croatia)	4–1	(Turkey) Fenerbahçe	Zagreb, Croatia
21:00 CEST (UTC+2)	Šunjić 16', (yellow card) 77'; Hajrović 27', 57', (yellow card) 44'; Olmo 60'; Gojak (yellow card) 63'	Report	Neustädter 47'; Köybaşı (yellow card) 63'; Elmas (yellow card) 69'	Stadium: Stadion Maksimir; Attendance: 17,303; Referee: Craig Pawson (England); Assistant referees: Lee Betts, Ian Hussin; Fourth official: Harry Lennard

4 October 2018 2	Fenerbahçe (Turkey)	2–0	(Slovakia) Spartak Trnava	Istanbul
19:55 TRT (UTC+3)	Slimani 52', 69'; Frey (yellow card) 70'; Ayew (yellow card) 73'; Valbuena (yellow card) 79'	Report	Chanturishvili (yellow card) 80'	Stadium: Şükrü Saracoğlu Stadium; Attendance: 29,622; Referee: Tobias Welz (Germany); Assistant referees: Rafael Foltyn, Markus Häcker; Fourth official: Dominik Schaal

25 October 2018 3	Anderlecht (Belgium)	2–2	(Turkey) Fenerbahçe	Anderlecht, Belgium
18:55 CEST (UTC+2)	Bakkali 35', 50', (yellow card) 78'; Kums (yellow card) 45'; Saelemaekers (yellow card) 68'; Santini (yellow card) 68'	Report	Jailson (yellow card) 10'; Isla (yellow card) 27'; Škrtel (yellow card) 43'; Slimani (yellow card) 45'; Benzia (yellow card) 52'; Frey 53'; Elmas (yellow card) 64'; Kaldırım 57', (yellow card) 90'	Stadium: Constant Vanden Stock Stadium; Attendance: 13,292; Referee: Georgi Kabakov (Bulgaria); Assistant referees: Martin Margaritov, Divan Valkov; Fourth official: Georgi Todorov

8 November 2018 4	Fenerbahçe (Turkey)	2–0	(Belgium) Anderlecht	Istanbul
18:50 TRT (UTC+3)	Kaldırım (yellow card) 60'; Valbuena 71'; Frey 74'	Report	Bakkali (yellow card) 76' (yellow-red card) 79'	Stadium: Şükrü Saracoğlu Stadium; Attendance: 32,789; Referee: Andreas Ekberg (Sweden); Assistant referees: Daniel Wärnmark, Stefan Hallberg; Fourth official: Fredrik Klyver

29 November 2018 5	Fenerbahçe (Turkey)	0–0	(Croatia) Dinamo Zagreb	Istanbul
20:55 TRT (UTC+3)	Frey (yellow card) 11'; Isla (yellow card) 39'; Neustädter (yellow card) 59'; Elmas (yellow card) 90+4'	Report	Ademi (yellow card) 36'; Rrahmani (yellow card) 44'	Stadium: Şükrü Saracoğlu Stadium; Attendance: 24,776; Referee: Robert Schörgenhofer (Austria); Assistant referees: Markus Gutschi, Roland Riedel; Fourth official: Andreas Witschnigg

13 December 2018 6	Spartak Trnava (Slovakia)	1–0	(Turkey) Fenerbahçe	Trnava, Slovakia
21:00 CET (UTC+1)	Greššák (yellow card) 33'; Yilmaz 41'; Grendel (yellow card) 79'	Report	Özbayraklı (yellow card) 82'; Köybaşı (yellow card) 88'	Stadium: Štadión Antona Malatinského; Attendance: 11,413; Referee: José María Sánchez Martínez (Spain); Assistant referees: Raúl Cabanero, Javier Rodriguez; Fourth official: Diego Barbero Sevilla

==== Knockout phase ====
===== Round of 32 =====
12 February 2019 First leg	Fenerbahçe (Turkey)	1–0	(Russia) Zenit Saint Petersburg	Istanbul
20:55 TRT (UTC+3)	Isla (yellow card) 14'; Slimani 21'; Çiftpınar (yellow card) 31'	Report	Rakitskiy (yellow card) 5'; Anyukov (yellow card) 40'; Mak (yellow card) 68'	Stadium: Şükrü Saracoğlu Stadium; Attendance: 36,572; Referee: Ruddy Buquet (France); Assistant referees: Guillaume Debart, Julien Pacelli; Fourth official: Cyril Mugnier

21 February 2019 Second leg	Zenit Saint Petersburg (Russia)	3–1 (3–2 agg.)	(Turkey) Fenerbahçe	Saint Petersburg, Russia
20:55 MSK (UTC+3)	Ozdoyev 4'; Azmoun (yellow card) 18', (goal) 37', 76'; Hernani (yellow card) 34'; Barrios (yellow card) 50'	Report	Škrtel (yellow card) 40'; Topal 43'; Potuk (yellow card) 45+1'; Arslan (yellow card) 71'; Özbayraklı (yellow card) 83'; Elmas (yellow card) 90'	Stadium: Saint Petersburg Stadium; Attendance: 50,448; Referee: Michael Oliver (England); Assistant referees: Stuart Burt, Simon Bennett; Fourth official: Ian Hussin

== Statistics ==
As of 26 May 2019

No.	PMF.	Nat.	Player	Süper Lig						Turkish Cup						Europa League						Total						Friendly					
No.	PMF.	Nat.	Player	Ap	G	A	Yellow card	(yellow card) (red card)	Red card	Ap	G	A	Yellow card	(yellow card) (red card)	Red card	Ap	G	A	Yellow card	(yellow card) (red card)	Red card	Ap	G	A	Yellow card	(yellow card) (red card)	Red card	Ap	G	A	Yellow card	(yellow card) (red card)	Red card
1	GK	(Turkey)	Volkan Demirel (captain)	12	-	-	-	-	-	2	-	-	-	-	-	2	-	-	-	-	-	16	-	-	-	-	-	4	-	-	-	-	-
3	DF	(Turkey)	Hasan Ali Kaldırım	31	1	3	6	-	1	2	-	-	-	-	-	8	1	2	2	-	-	41	2	5	8	-	1	6	1	-	1	-	-
4	DF	(Chile)	Mauricio Isla	28	-	7	5	-	-	1	-	-	-	-	-	8	-	-	3	-	-	37	-	7	8	-	-	7	-	-	-	-	-
5	MF	(Turkey)	Mehmet Topal (vice-captain)	28	1	1	5	-	-	2	1	1	-	-	-	6	1	1	-	-	-	36	3	3	5	-	-	4	-	-	-	-	-
6	DF	(Turkey)	İsmail Köybaşı	9	-	-	1	-	-	3	-	-	-	-	-	5	-	-	2	-	-	17	-	-	6	-	-	3	1	-	-	-	-
7	MF	(Turkey)	Alper Potuk	8	-	-	2	-	-	-	-	-	-	-	-	6	2	-	1	-	-	14	2	-	3	-	-	6	2	-	-	-	-
8	MF	(Nigeria)	Victor Moses	14	4	1	3	-	-	-	-	-	-	-	-	2	-	-	-	-	-	16	4	1	3	-	-	-	-	-	-	-	-
9	FW	(Spain)	Roberto Soldado	21	5	3	5	-	2	2	1	1	-	-	-	2	-	-	1	-	-	25	6	4	5	-	2	2	-	-	-	-	-
11	MF	(Turkey)	Mehmet Ekici	21	2	1	3	-	1	3	2	1	-	-	-	1	-	-	1	-	-	25	4	2	4	-	1	4	1	-	-	-	-
13	GK	(Cameroon)	Carlos Kameni	-	-	-	-	-	-	-	-	-	-	-	-	-	-	-	-	-	-	-	-	-	-	-	-	4	-	-	-	-	-
15	DF	(Turkey)	Serdar Aziz	10	1	-	5	-	-	-	-	-	-	-	-	-	-	-	-	-	-	10	1	-	5	-	-	-	-	-	-	-	-
16	MF	(Netherlands)	Ferdi Kadıoğlu	-	-	-	-	-	-	1	-	-	-	-	-	-	-	-	-	-	-	1	-	-	-	-	-	4	-	-	-	-	-
17	MF	(Morocco)	Nabil Dirar	16	1	4	3	-	-	2	-	-	-	-	-	1	-	-	-	-	-	19	1	4	3	-	-	4	-	-	-	-	-
18	MF	(Germany)	Tolgay Arslan	11	-	-	3	1	-	-	-	-	-	-	-	1	-	-	1	-	-	12	-	-	4	1	-	-	-	-	-	-	-
19	DF	(Turkey)	Şener Özbayraklı	9	-	-	-	-	-	3	-	-	-	-	-	5	-	-	3	-	-	17	-	-	3	-	-	4	-	-	-	-	-
20	MF	(Ghana)	André Ayew	29	5	1	4	-	-	3	-	-	-	-	-	6	-	1	1	-	-	38	5	1	5	-	-	2	-	-	-	-	-
21	GK	(Slovenia)	Miha Zajc	10	2	-	1	-	-	-	-	-	-	-	-	-	-	-	-	-	-	10	2	-	1	-	-	-	-	-	-	-	-
22	FW	(Switzerland)	Michael Frey	14	3	-	2	-	-	3	-	-	-	-	-	5	2	1	2	-	-	22	5	1	4	-	-	1	1	-	-	-	-
25	GK	(Turkey)	Berke Özer	-	-	-	-	-	-	1	-	-	-	-	-	-	-	-	-	-	-	1	-	-	-	-	-	1	-	-	-	-	-
26	MF	(Turkey)	Tolga Ciğerci	-	-	-	-	-	-	-	-	-	-	-	-	-	-	-	-	-	-	-	-	-	-	-	-	-	-	-	-	-	-
28	MF	(France)	Mathieu Valbuena	22	3	7	2	-	-	3	-	-	-	-	-	6	1	1	1	-	-	31	4	8	3	-	-	5	1	-	-	-	-
31	FW	(Algeria)	Islam Slimani	15	1	-	4	1	-	3	1	-	1	-	-	7	3	-	1	-	-	25	5	-	6	-	-	1	-	-	-	-	-
32	MF	(Brazil)	Jailson	20	2	1	2	-	1	1	-	-	-	-	-	6	-	-	1	-	-	27	2	1	3	-	1	1	-	-	-	-	-
33	DF	(Russia)	Roman Neustädter	21	1	-	3	1	-	2	-	-	-	-	-	8	1	-	1	-	-	31	2	-	4	-	-	6	-	-	-	-	-
35	FW	(Turkey)	Harun Tekin	22	-	-	3	-	-	1	-	-	-	-	-	8	-	-	1	-	-	31	-	-	4	-	-	1	-	-	-	-	-
37	DF	(Slovakia)	Martin Škrtel	26	1	-	5	-	-	4	-	-	-	-	1	9	-	-	2	-	-	39	1	-	7	-	1	6	-	-	-	-	-
39	MF	(Algeria)	Yassine Benzia	13	-	1	3	-	-	4	-	-	-	-	-	3	-	-	1	-	-	20	-	1	4	-	-	-	-	-	-	-	-
44	DF	(Turkey)	Sadık Çiftpınar	9	1	-	4	1	-	2	-	-	-	-	-	2	-	-	1	-	-	13	1	-	5	1	-	1	-	-	-	-	-
54	GK	(Turkey)	Erten Ersu	-	-	-	-	-	-	-	-	-	-	-	-	-	-	-	-	-	-	-	-	-	-	-	-	2	-	-	-	-	-
66	MF	(Turkey)	Oğuz Kağan Güçtekin	1	-	-	-	-	-	-	-	-	-	-	-	1	-	-	-	-	-	2	-	-	-	-	-	1	-	-	-	-	-
80	MF	(Turkey)	Serhat Kot	-	-	-	-	-	-	-	-	-	-	-	-	-	-	-	-	-	-	-	-	-	-	-	-	4	-	-	-	-	-
99	MF	(North Macedonia)	Eljif Elmas	29	4	-	4	-	-	2	-	-	1	-	1	9	-	-	6	-	-	40	4	-	11	-	1	7	1	1	-	-	-
8	MF	(Turkey)	Ozan Tufan	-	-	-	-	-	-	-	-	-	-	-	-	-	-	-	-	-	-	-	-	-	-	-	-	4	1	-	-	-	-
10	MF	(Brazil)	Giuliano	1	1	-	-	-	-	-	-	-	-	-	-	2	-	-	-	-	-	3	1	-	-	-	-	5	2	-	-	-	-
15	MF	(Turkey)	Uygar Mert Zeybek	-	-	-	-	-	-	-	-	-	-	-	-	-	-	-	-	-	-	-	-	-	-	-	-	2	-	-	-	-	-
23	DF	(Mexico)	Diego Reyes	8	-	-	2	-	-	2	1	-	-	-	-	4	-	-	-	-	-	14	1	-	2	-	-	1	-	-	-	-	-
24	MF	(Turkey)	Barış Alıcı	8	-	1	-	-	-	2	-	-	-	-	-	5	-	-	-	-	-	15	-	1	-	-	-	5	-	-	-	-	-
53	DF	(Turkey)	Yiğithan Güveli	1	-	-	1	-	-	1	-	-	-	-	-	1	-	-	-	-	-	3	-	-	-	-	-	4	1	-	-	-	-
89	MF	(Brazil)	Josef de Souza	2	1	-	-	-	-	-	-	-	-	-	-	-	-	-	-	-	-	2	1	-	-	-	-	6	-	-	-	-	-
92	MF	(Morocco)	Aatif Chahechouhe	3	-	-	-	-	-	-	-	-	-	-	-	1	-	-	-	-	-	4	-	-	-	-	-	3	1	-	-	-	-
