= Jailson (footballer, born 1995) =

Brazilian footballer

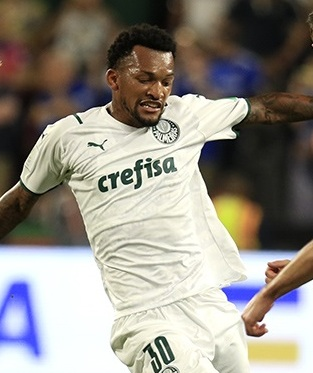
- Jailson with Palmeiras at the 2021 FIFA Club World Cup

Personal information
- Full name: Jailson Marques Siqueira
- Date of birth: 7 September 1995 (age 31)
- Place of birth: Caçapava do Sul, Brazil
- Height: 1.78 m (5 ft 10 in)
- Position: Defensive midfielder

Team information
- Current team: Fortaleza
- Number: 20

Youth career
- 2011–2013: Guarany de Bagé
- 2014–2015: Grêmio
- 2015: → Chapecoense (loan)

Senior career*
Years	Team	Apps	(Gls)
2015–2018	Grêmio	83	(3)
2015	→ Chapecoense (loan)	0	(0)
2018–2020	Fenerbahçe	46	(3)
2020–2021	Dalian Pro	6	(0)
2022–2023	Palmeiras	37	(0)
2024–2025	Celta Vigo	27	(0)
2025	Los Angeles FC	3	(0)
2026–	Fortaleza	0	(0)
- * Club domestic league appearances and goals as of 01:37, 4 January 2026 (UTC)

Jailson Marques Siqueira (born 7 September 1995), simply known as Jailson, is a Brazilian professional footballer who plays as a defensive midfielder for Fortaleza.

== Career ==
=== Chapecoense ===
Jailson made his professional debut on 18 March 2015, playing for Chapecoense in a Copa do Brasil match against Interporto, entering the field in the second half of a 5–2 away victory.

=== Grêmio ===
In January 2016, Jailson returned to his parent club Grêmio. He made his debut for the club in a 3–2 away loss against São Paulo-RS for the Campeonato Gaúcho. Jailson scored his first professional goal in a 3–3 away draw against former club Chapecoense for the Campeonato Brasileiro.

=== Fenerbahçe ===
On 30 August 2018, Jailson joined Süper Lig club Fenerbahçe S.K.

=== Dalian Pro ===
On 18 September 2020, Jailson signed with Chinese Super League (CSL) club Dalian Pro. He did not play for the team in 2021 as he was unable to return to China.

=== Palmeiras ===
On 7 January 2022, Jailson signed with Palmeiras.

=== Celta ===
On 28 December 2023, Jailson moved to Spain, signing a contract until 30 June 2025 with La Liga club Celta de Vigo.

=== Los Angeles FC ===
On 2 September 2025, MLS club Los Angeles FC signed free agent midfielder Jailson through the remainder of the 2025 season with club options for 2026 and 2027. At the end of the season, Jailson's contract option was declined.

== Career statistics ==
As of match played 2 November 2025

Appearances and goals by club, season and competition
Club	Season	League			State league		National cup		Continental		Other		Total	
Club	Season	Division	Apps	Goals	Apps	Goals	Apps	Goals	Apps	Goals	Apps	Goals	Apps	Goals
Grêmio	2015	Série A	0	0	0	0	0	0	—		—		0	0
Grêmio	2016	Série A	29	2	2 (Note: Appearances in Campeonato Gaúcho)	0	6	0	0	0	—		37	2
Grêmio	2017	Série A	18	0	10	0	2	0	11 (Note: Appearance(s) in Copa Libertadores)	0	3 (Note: One appearance in Primeira Liga, two appearances in FIFA Club World Cup)	0	44	0
Grêmio	2018	Série A	14	1	10	0	2	0	4	1	2 (Note: Appearances in Recopa Sudamericana)	0	32	2
Grêmio	Total		61	3	22	0	10	0	15	1	5	0	113	4
Chapecoense (loan)	2015	Série A	0	0	0	0	1	0	—		—		1	0
Fenerbahçe	2018–19	Süper Lig	19	2	—		1	0	8 (Note: Appearances in UEFA Europa League)	0	—		28	2
Fenerbahçe	2019–20	Süper Lig	27	1	—		8	0	—		—		35	1
Fenerbahçe	Total		46	3	—		9	0	8	0	—		63	3
Dalian Professional	2020	Chinese Super League	6	0	—		0	0	—		—		6	0
Dalian Professional	2021	Chinese Super League	0	0	—		0	0	—		—		0	0
Dalian Professional	Total		6	0	—		0	0	—		—		6	0
Palmeiras	2022	Série A	2	0	13 (Note: Appearances in Campeonato Paulista)	0	0	0	1	0	4 (Note: Two appearances in FIFA Club World Cup, two appearances and one goal in Recopa Sudamericana)	1	20	1
Palmeiras	2023	Série A	8	0	14	0	0	0	3	0	1 (Note: Appearance in Supercopa do Brasil)	0	26	0
Palmeiras	Total		10	0	27	0	0	0	4	0	5	1	46	1
Celta	2023–24	La Liga	14	0	—		3	1	—		—		17	1
Celta	2024–25	La Liga	13	0	—		0	0	—		—		13	0
Celta	Total		27	0	—		3	1	—		—		30	1
Los Angeles FC	2025	Major League Soccer	3	0	—		—		—		2	0	5	0
Career total			153	6	49	0	23	1	27	1	12	1	264	9

== Honours ==
Grêmio

- Copa do Brasil: 2016
- Copa Libertadores: 2017
- Recopa Sudamericana: 2018
- Campeonato Gaúcho: 2018
- FIFA Club World Cup runner-up: 2017

Palmeiras

- Recopa Sudamericana: 2022
- Campeonato Paulista: 2022, 2023
- Série A: 2022, 2023
- Supercopa do Brasil: 2023
- FIFA Club World Cup runner-up: 2021
