= Guo Yunqi =

Chinese association football player

Personal information
- Date of birth: 26 June 1997 (age 29)
- Height: 1.75 m (5 ft 9 in)
- Position: Midfielder

Youth career
- –2020: Shijiazhuang Ever Bright

Senior career*
Years	Team	Apps	(Gls)
2020–2024	Cangzhou Mighty Lions	3	(0)
- * Club domestic league appearances and goals as of 14:01, 31 January 2023 (UTC)

Guo Yunqi (Chinese: 郭芸齐; born 26 June 1997) is a Chinese footballer who played most recently as a midfielder for Cangzhou Mighty Lions.

== Club career ==
Guo Yunqi would make his debut for Shijiazhuang Ever Bright (now known as Cangzhou Mighty Lions) on 19 September 2020 in a Chinese FA Cup game against Tianjin TEDA F.C. that ended in a 2-0 defeat. This would be followed by his first league appearance on 28 September 2020 against Beijing Sinobo Guoan in a 4-0 defeat.

== Career statistics ==
As of 31 January 2023.

Club	Season	League			Cup		Continental		Other		Total	
Club	Season	Division	Apps	Goals	Apps	Goals	Apps	Goals	Apps	Goals	Apps	Goals
Shijiazhuang Ever Bright/ Cangzhou Mighty Lions	2020	Chinese Super League	1	0	1	0	–		–		2	0
Shijiazhuang Ever Bright/ Cangzhou Mighty Lions	2021	Chinese Super League	0	0	1	0	–		–		1	0
Shijiazhuang Ever Bright/ Cangzhou Mighty Lions	2022	Chinese Super League	2	0	1	0	–		–		3	0
Shijiazhuang Ever Bright/ Cangzhou Mighty Lions	Total		3	0	3	0	0	0	0	0	6	0
Career total			3	0	3	0	0	0	0	0	6	0
