= Cangzhou Stadium =

Football stadium in Cangzhou, China

- Interactive map of Cangzhou Stadium
- Location: Cangzhou, China
- Coordinates: 38°18′32″N 116°47′53″E
- Capacity: 31,836

Construction
- Groundbreaking: May 6, 2010
- Opened: 2011

Tenant
- Cangzhou Mighty Lions

Cangzhou Stadium is a multi-purpose stadium in Cangzhou, China. The stadium holds 31,836 spectators. It broke ground on May 6, 2010 and opened in 2011.
