= Cangzhou Mighty Lions F.C. =

Chinese professional football club

Cangzhou Mighty Lions 沧州雄狮
- Full name: Cangzhou Mighty Lions Football Club
- Founded: 25 February 2011; 15 years ago
- Dissolved: 2025
- Ground: Cangzhou Stadium
- Capacity: 31,836
- Owner: Yongchang Real Estate
- Chairman: Li Qiang
- Head coach: Li Xiaopeng
- 2024: Chinese Super League, 13th of 16 (expelled from league)
- Website: www.sjzycfc.com
Home colours	Away colours

Cangzhou Mighty Lions Football Club (Chinese: 沧州雄狮足球俱乐部; pinyin: Cāngzhōu Xióngshī Zúqiú Jùlèbù) was a Chinese professional football club based in Cangzhou, Hebei. Cangzhou Mighty Lions played its home matches at the Cangzhou Stadium, located within Yunhe District. Their majority shareholder was the Yongchang Real Estate, who own 70% of the shares of the club.

== History ==
Smart Hero F.C. logo used between 2011-2012

On February 25, 2011, the club was founded by Smart Hero International Trading Limited (骏豪投资有限公司), Xiamen Dongyuhang Import & Export Co., Ltd. (厦门东屿行进出口有限公司), Xiamen City HS Sheng Industrial Co., Ltd. (厦门协晟工贸有限公司), and Xiamen City Shengxin Metal Products Co., Ltd. (厦门金盛鑫金属制), on the basis of local amateur club Xiamen Dongyuhang, which just won the runners-up spot of the China Amateur Football League last year, as Fujian Smart Hero F.C. (Chinese: 福建骏豪足球俱乐部). Within their debut season, they played in the China League Two division within the 2011 league season, where their home uniforms were yellow tops and black shorts. Fujian, in their first season, would win promotion to the 2012 China League One division via the League One relegation play-off in which Fujian beat Guizhou Zhicheng 6–5 in a penalty shootout.

In the 2012 China League One campaign, Xu Hui was appointed as manager and he would lead the club to a third-place finish. This saw Yongchang Real Estate (Chinese: 永昌地产集团) becoming interested in the team and they bought 70% shares of the club, which officially went through on January 18, 2013. The club moved to Hebei Province's capital city Shijiazhuang into the Yutong International Sports Center. They changed the club's colors to blue and the team's name into Shijiazhuang Yongchang Junhao F.C. (Chinese: 石家庄永昌骏豪足球俱乐部). On December 27, 2013, Yongchang Real Estate bought the remaining 30% shares of the club and on February 24, 2014, Shijiazhuang Yongchang Junhao F.C. changed their name to Shijiazhuang Yongchang F.C. (Chinese: 石家庄永昌足球俱乐部). In the 2014 league season, Shijiazhuang Yongchang won promotion to the top tier for the first time in their history when they came runners-up within their division. The club's first act within the top flight was to change their English name to Shijiazhuang Ever Bright F.C. (while their Chinese name still remained as 石家庄永昌) in January 2015.

Shijiazhuang Yongchang Junhao F.C. logo used in 2013

The club's debut season within the top tier saw the club's manager Yasen Petrov guiding the team to seventh in the league and safely away from relegation at the end of the 2015 league season. The following campaign would prove to be considerably more difficult and Yasen Petrov was relieved of his position on 14 July 2016, and replaced by Li Jinyu on a caretaker basis, after a run of bad form saw the club in a relegation battle. The club was relegated at the end of the 2016 Chinese Super League season and on 7 November 2016, brought in Afshin Ghotbi as their new coach for the following season. Fortunately, they remained contenders for promotion in the next few seasons, but despite earning third place in 2017, they failed to win promotion for the next two years.

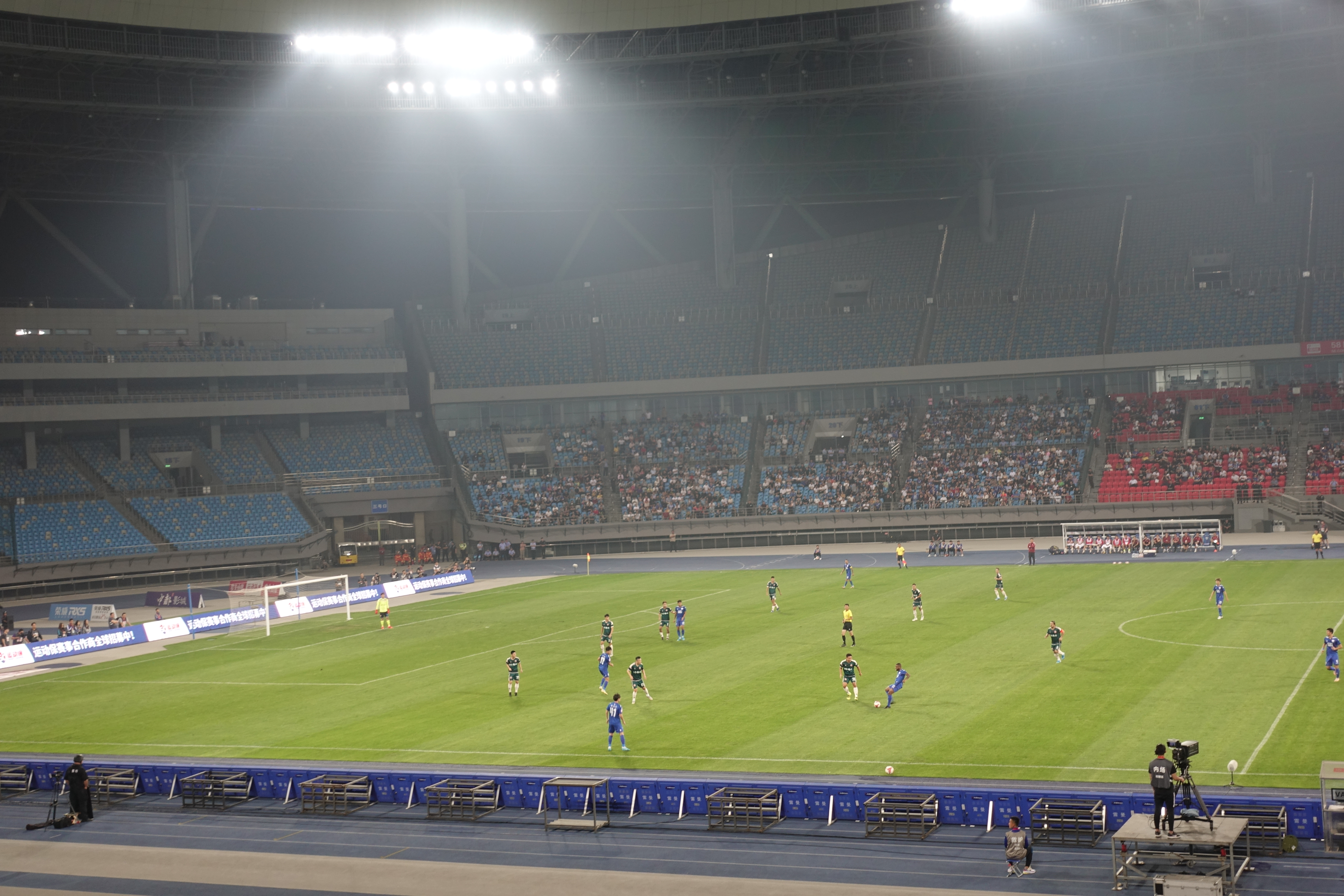
A Shijiazhuang Ever Bright home match in 2019

They were promoted again in 2019 but finished last in the 2020 relegation tournament. They escaped relegation when Super League team Jiangsu F.C. dissolved in 2021. They were renamed as Cangzhou Mighty Lions ahead of the 2021 season when the Chinese FA sought to remove corporation names from team names.

== Name history ==
- 2011–12: Fujian Smart Hero (福建骏豪)
- 2013: Shijiazhuang Yongchang Junhao (石家庄永昌骏豪)
- 2014: Shijiazhuang Yongchang (石家庄永昌)
- 2015–2020: Shijiazhuang Ever Bright (石家庄永昌)
- 2021–: Cangzhou Mighty Lions (沧州雄狮)

== Players ==
=== First team squad ===
As of 31 December 2024

Note: Flags indicate national team as defined under FIFA eligibility rules; some limited exceptions apply. Players may hold more than one non-FIFA nationality.

No.	Pos.	Nation	Player
5	DF	CHN	Yan Zihao
6	DF	ENG	Ayo Obileye
7	FW	CHN	Zheng Dalun
8	MF	CHN	Zhao Yingjie
10	FW	COD	Oscar Maritu
12	DF	CHN	Zhu Yue (on loan from Shanghai Shenhua)
13	DF	CHN	Sun Qinhan
14	GK	CHN	Shao Puliang
15	MF	CHN	Wang Peng
16	DF	CHN	Zheng Kaimu
17	FW	CHN	Wen Da
18	MF	CHN	Yao Xuchen
19	MF	KAZ	Georgy Zhukov
20	FW	CHN	Liu Xinyu

No.	Pos.	Nation	Player
21	MF	CHN	Li Xiaopeng
22	DF	CHN	Wu Wei
23	DF	CHN	Li Hong
24	MF	CHN	Wu Guanjun
25	MF	CHN	Hou Jiahao
26	MF	CHN	Guo Yunqi
28	GK	CHN	Han Rongze (on loan from Shandong Taishan)
29	GK	CHN	Han Feng
30	MF	CHN	Hou Jiarui
31	FW	ENG	Viv Solomon-Otabor
33	MF	CHN	Hu Jiali
35	MF	CHN	Zhou Jianyi
36	DF	CHN	Yang Yun
37	GK	CHN	Dong Hang

=== Out on loan ===
Note: Flags indicate national team as defined under FIFA eligibility rules; some limited exceptions apply. Players may hold more than one non-FIFA nationality.

No.	Pos.	Nation	Player
1	GK	CHN	Sun Jianxiang (at Wuxi Wugo until 31 December 2024)

=== Reserve squad ===
Note: Flags indicate national team as defined under FIFA eligibility rules; some limited exceptions apply. Players may hold more than one non-FIFA nationality.

No.	Pos.	Nation	Player
—	MF	CHN	Liu Xiaoqi

== Coaching staff ==
Position	Staff
Head coach	(China) Li Xiaopeng
Assistant coach	(Hong Kong) Bai He
Goalkeeper coach	(Bulgaria) Georgi Sheytanov
Conditioning coach	(Cyprus) Christos Sotiriou
Technical analyst	(China) Lü Hongchen
Technical director	(China) Zhao Junzhe

Source: sina.com

=== Managerial history ===
Managers who have coached the club since they became a completely professional unit on February 25, 2011.

- (China) Zhao Tuqiang (2011)
- (China) Xu Hui (2012 – May 14, 2013)
- (China) Xu Tao (interim) (May 14, 2013 – June 30, 2013)
- (China) Li Shubin (Jun 30, 2013 – Dec 12, 2013)
- (Bulgaria) Yasen Petrov (Dec 12, 2013 – 14 Jul 2016)
- (China) Li Jinyu (caretaker) (14 Jul 2016 – 7 Nov 2016)
- (Iran) (United States) Afshin Ghotbi (7 Nov 2016 – 3 Sep 2018)
- (Bulgaria) Yasen Petrov (8 Sep 2018 – 19 Jul 2019 )
- (Iran) (United States) Afshin Ghotbi (20 Jul 2019 – 6 Sep 2021)
- (China) Liu Yan (caretaker) (6 Sep 2021 – 3 Nov 2021)
- (Serbia) Svetozar Šapurić (4 Nov 2021 – 20 February 2023)
- (China) Zhao Junzhe (21 February 2023 – 15 July 2024 )
- (China) Li Xiaopeng (16 July 2024 – )

== Honours ==
- China League One
  - Runners-up: 2014

== Results ==
All-time League Rankings

As of the end of the 2023 season.

Year	Div	Pld	W	D	L	GF	GA	GD	Pts	Pos.	FA Cup	Super Cup	AFC	Att./G	Stadium
2011	3	26	13	9	4	32	16	16	39^{1}	3	DNE	DNQ	DNQ		Longyan Sports Center
2012	2	30	12	10	8	41	32	9	46	3	R2	DNQ	DNQ	4,142	Fuzhou Stadium / Jinjiang Sports Center Stadium
2013	2	30	10	10	10	26	25	1	40	8	R3	DNQ	DNQ	10,053	Yutong International Sports Center
2014	2	30	17	6	7	42	25	17	57	RU	R2	DNQ	DNQ	11,208	Yutong International Sports Center
2015	1	30	8	15	7	34	31	3	39	7	R3	DNQ	DNQ	25,070	Yutong International Sports Center
2016	1	30	7	9	14	28	53	-25	30	16	R4	DNQ	DNQ	22,523	Yutong International Sports Center
2017	2	30	14	12	4	48	34	14	54	3	R3	DNQ	DNQ	16,219	Yutong International Sports Center
2018	2	30	12	9	9	43	38	5	45	6	R3	DNQ	DNQ	12,405	Yutong International Sports Center
2019	2	30	18	2	10	59	42	17	56	RU	R4	DNQ	DNQ	17,488	Yutong International Sports Center
2020	1	20	5	7	8	23	29	-6	22	16^{2}	R1	DNQ	DNQ	N/A	Yutong International Sports Center
2021	1	22	6	6	10	25	32	-7	24	11	R5	DNQ	DNQ	N/A	Cangzhou Stadium
2022	1	34	11	11	12	47	51	-4	44	12	QF	DNQ	DNQ	N/A	Cangzhou Stadium
2023	1	30	8	7	15	29	60	-31	31	12	R3	DNQ	DNQ	8,692	Cangzhou Stadium

- ^1 In group stage.
- ^2 Avoided relegation due to the dissolution of Jiangsu Suning.

Key

	China top division
	China second division
	China third division
W	Winners
RU	Runners-up
3	Third place
	Relegated

- Pld = Played
- W = Games won
- D = Games drawn
- L = Games lost
- F = Goals for
- A = Goals against
- Pts = Points
- Pos = Final position
- DNQ = Did not qualify
- DNE = Did Not Enter
- NH = Not Held
- – = Does Not Exist
- R1 = Round 1
- R2 = Round 2
- R3 = Round 3
- R4 = Round 4
- F = Final
- SF = Semi-finals
- QF = Quarter-finals
- R16 = Round of 16
- Group = Group stage
- GS2 = Second Group stage
- QR1 = First Qualifying Round
- QR2 = Second Qualifying Round
- QR3 = Third Qualifying Round
