= Liu Xinyu (footballer, born 1991) =

Chinese association football player

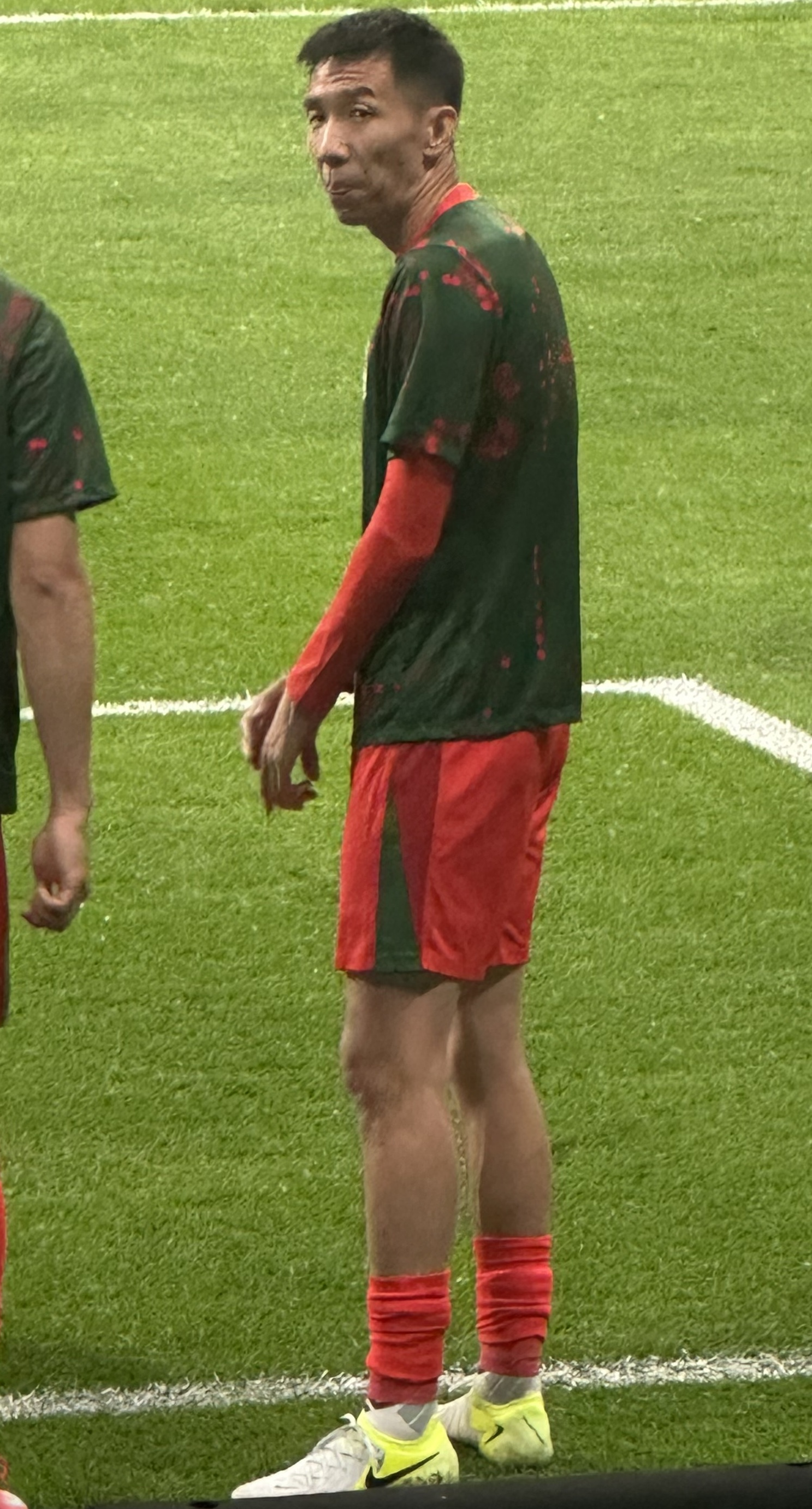
- Liu Xinyu in April 2025

Personal information
- Date of birth: 17 November 1991 (age 35)
- Place of birth: Shijiazhuang, Hebei, China
- Height: 1.83 m (6 ft 0 in)
- Positions: Midfielder; forward

Team information
- Current team: Qingdao Hainiu
- Number: 9

Senior career*
Years	Team	Apps	(Gls)
2012–2016	Hunan Billows	87	(9)
2017–2024	Cangzhou Mighty Lions	90	(10)
2025	Henan FC	12	(1)
2026–	Qingdao Hainiu	15	(0)
- * Club domestic league appearances and goals as of 22 November 2026

Liu Xinyu (Chinese: 刘鑫瑜; born 17 November 1991) is a Chinese footballer who plays currently as a midfielder or forward for Qingdao Hainiu.

== Club career ==
Liu Xinyu would play for second tier football club Hunan Billows where he established himself as versatile midfielder or forward for five seasons with the club. With his contract expiring he would move on a free transfer to Shijiazhuang Ever Bright (now known as Cangzhou Mighty Lions) on 15 February 2017. He would make his debut for the club on 18 March 2017 in a league game against Baoding Yingli ETS in a 2-0 defeat. He would go on to become a regular within the team and aid the club to gain promotion into the Chinese top tier when they came runners-up at the end of the 2019 league campaign.

On 17 February 2026, Liu transferred to Chinese Super League club Qingdao Hainiu.

== Career statistics ==
As of 31 December 2023.

Club	Season	League			National Cup		Continental		Other		Total	
Club	Season	Division	Apps	Goals	Apps	Goals	Apps	Goals	Apps	Goals	Apps	Goals
Hunan Billows	2012	China League One	6	0	1	0	–		–		7	0
Hunan Billows	2013	China League One	18	0	2	2	–		–		20	2
Hunan Billows	2014	China League One	15	3	0	0	–		–		15	3
Hunan Billows	2015	China League One	26	1	0	0	–		–		26	1
Hunan Billows	2016	China League One	22	5	0	0	–		–		22	5
Hunan Billows	Total		87	9	3	2	0	0	0	0	90	11
Shijiazhuang Ever Bright/ Cangzhou Mighty Lions	2017	China League One	7	1	1	1	–		–		8	2
Shijiazhuang Ever Bright/ Cangzhou Mighty Lions	2018	China League One	8	0	0	0	–		–		8	0
Shijiazhuang Ever Bright/ Cangzhou Mighty Lions	2019	China League One	27	8	2	1	–		–		29	9
Shijiazhuang Ever Bright/ Cangzhou Mighty Lions	2020	Chinese Super League	14	0	1	0	–		–		15	0
Shijiazhuang Ever Bright/ Cangzhou Mighty Lions	2021	Chinese Super League	12	0	1	0	–		–		13	0
Shijiazhuang Ever Bright/ Cangzhou Mighty Lions	2022	Chinese Super League	22	1	1	1	–		–		23	2
Shijiazhuang Ever Bright/ Cangzhou Mighty Lions	2023	Chinese Super League	10	0	1	0	–		–		11	0
Shijiazhuang Ever Bright/ Cangzhou Mighty Lions	Total		100	10	7	3	0	0	0	0	107	13
Career total			187	19	10	5	0	0	0	0	197	24
