= Hu Jiali =

Chinese association football player

Personal information
- Date of birth: 2 September 1999 (age 27)
- Place of birth: Shanghai, China
- Height: 1.85 m (6 ft 1 in)
- Position: Midfielder

Team information
- Current team: Guangxi Lanhang
- Number: 19

Youth career
- –2017: Shanghai SIPG
- 2017–2019: Shanghai Shenhua
- 2019–2021: Dalian Professional

Senior career*
Years	Team	Apps	(Gls)
2021	Qingdao FC	13	(0)
2022	Wuhan Yangtze River	18	(0)
2023	Heilongjiang Ice City	9	(0)
2024	Cangzhou Mighty Lions	8	(0)
2025	Jiangxi Lushan	4	(0)
2025-	Guangxi Lanhang	0	(0)
- * Club domestic league appearances and goals as of 08:01, 22 April 2022 (UTC)

Hu Jiali (Chinese: 胡家笠; born 2 September 1999) is a Chinese footballer who plays as a midfielder for Guangxi Lanhang.

== Career statistics ==
=== Club ===
As of 14 October 2023.

Club	Season	League			Cup		Continental		Other		Total	
Club	Season	Division	Apps	Goals	Apps	Goals	Apps	Goals	Apps	Goals	Apps	Goals
Qingdao FC	2021	Chinese Super League	13	0	2	0	–		0	0	15	0
Wuhan Yangtze River	2022	Chinese Super League	18	0	1	0	–		–		19	0
Heilongjiang Ice City	2023	China League One	9	0	1	0	–		–		10	0
Career total			40	0	4	0	0	0	0	0	44	0
