= Yang Haoyu (footballer, born 2000) =

Chinese association football player

Personal information
- Date of birth: 31 July 2000 (age 26)
- Height: 1.83 m (6 ft 0 in)
- Position: Defender

Team information
- Current team: Hubei Istar

Youth career
- Vitória de Guimarães
- Padroense
- Gondomar

Senior career*
Years	Team	Apps	(Gls)
2020–	Hubei Istar	0	(0)
2020	→ Dalian Pro (loan)	0	(0)
2021	→ Dalian Pro (loan)	3	(0)
- * Club domestic league appearances and goals as of 14:01, 31 December 2021 (UTC)

Yang Haoyu (Chinese: 杨浩宇; born 31 July 2000) is a Chinese footballer currently playing as a left-back for Hubei Istar.

== Club career ==
On 8 October 2020 Yang Haoyu was loaned out to top tier club Dalian Pro for the 2020 Chinese Super League season. While he would not make any appearances for Dalian he would loaned out to them again for the following season and he would make his debut for the club on 22 April 2021 in a league game against Changchun Yatai F.C. in a 3-1 defeat.

== Career statistics ==
As of 31 December 2021.

Club	Season	League			Cup		Continental		Other		Total	
Club	Season	Division	Apps	Goals	Apps	Goals	Apps	Goals	Apps	Goals	Apps	Goals
Hubei Istar	2020	China League Two	0	0	0	0	–		–		0	0
Hubei Istar	2021	China League Two	0	0	0	0	–		–		0	0
Hubei Istar	Total		0	0	0	0	0	0	0	0	0	0
Dalian Pro (loan)	2020	Chinese Super League	0	0	0	0	–		–		0	0
Dalian Pro (loan)	2021	Chinese Super League	3	0	1	0	–		0 (Note: Appearance(s) in CSL Relegation play-offs)	0	4	0
Dalian Pro (loan)	Total		3	0	1	0	0	0	0	0	4	0
Career total			3	0	1	0	0	0	0	0	4	0
