= Kudirat Ablet =

Chinese footballer (born 1997)

Personal information
- Full name: Kudirat Ablet
- Date of birth: 5 February 1997 (age 29)
- Place of birth: Yining, Xinjiang, China
- Height: 1.91 m (6 ft 3 in)
- Position: Goalkeeper

Team information
- Current team: Liaoning Tieren

Youth career
- ?–2016: Xinjiang Youth

Senior career*
Years	Team	Apps	(Gls)
2016	Xinjiang Tianshan Leopard	0	(0)
2017–2020	Gondomar	5	(0)
2021–2023	Dalian Pro	5	(0)
2024	Chongqing Tonglianglong	19	(0)
2025–	Liaoning Tieren	1	(0)

International career^{‡}
2018–2019	China U23	2	(0)
- * Club domestic league appearances and goals as of 1 March 2026 ‡ National team caps and goals as of 19 November 2018

Kudirat Ablet (Chinese: 库迪热提·阿布来提; born 5 February 1997) is a Chinese footballer who plays for Chinese Super League side Liaoning Tieren.

== Club career ==
Kudirat Ablet would start his career playing for the Xinjiang youth team. The team would be incorporated into the Xinjiang Tianshan Leopard football club. In 2017, he represented Xinjiang Under-20 in the National Games of China. By the 2016 China League One campaign he would be promoted to the senior team. On 1 July 2016, he moved abroad to join Portuguese club Gondomar. He would make his debut in a league game on 20 September 2020 against S.C. Salgueiros in a 1-1 draw.

On 26 February 2021, he returned to China when he signed with top tier club Dalian Pro. He make his first appearance for the team in the 2021 Chinese FA Cup against China U-20 on 13 October 2021 in a 2-1 victory. He would have to wait the following season for his first league appearance for the club on 4 November 2022 against Shanghai Port in a game that ended in a 2-1 defeat.

On 20 January 2025, Kudirat Ablet joined China League One club Liaoning Tieren. He was part of the squad that were promoted to the 2026 Chinese Super League for the first time in the clubs history, being crowned the 2025 China League One champions in the process.

== International career ==
In 2017, Kudirat was called up by the China U–20 training team.

In 2018, he played for the team in the Chongqing International Youth Tournament against Mexico.

He played in the 2019 Toulon Tournament, and had one appearance against Chile.

== Career statistics ==
Statistics accurate as of match played 1 March 2026.

Appearances and goals by club, season and competition
Club	Season	League			National Cup		Continental		Other		Total	
Club	Season	Division	Apps	Goals	Apps	Goals	Apps	Goals	Apps	Goals	Apps	Goals
Xinjiang Tianshan Leopard	2016	China League One	0	0	0	0	-		-		0	0
Gondomar	2017–18	Campeonato de Portugal	0	0	0	0	-		-		0	0
Gondomar	2018–19	Campeonato de Portugal	0	0	0	0	-		-		0	0
Gondomar	2019–20	Campeonato de Portugal	0	0	0	0	-		-		0	0
Gondomar	2020–21	Campeonato de Portugal	5	0	0	0	-		-		5	0
Gondomar	Total		5	0	0	0	0	0	0	0	5	0
Dalian Professional	2021	Chinese Super League	0	0	3	0	-		-		3	0
Dalian Professional	2022	Chinese Super League	4	0	0	0	-		-		4	0
Dalian Professional	2023	Chinese Super League	1	0	4	0	-		-		5	0
Dalian Professional	Total		5	0	7	0	0	0	0	0	12	0
Chongqing Tonglianglong	2024	China League One	19	0	1	0	-		-		20	0
Liaoning Tieren	2025	China League One	1	0	1	0	-		-		2	0
Liaoning Tieren	2026	Chinese Super League	0	0	0	0	-		-		0	0
Liaoning Tieren	Total		1	0	1	0	0	0	0	0	2	0
Career total			30	0	9	0	0	0	0	0	39	0

== Honours ==
=== Club ===
Liaoning Tieren FC

- China League One: 2025
