= 2019 Toulon Tournament squads =

The 2019 Toulon Tournament was an international association football tournament held in Bouches-du-Rhône, France. The twelve national teams involved in the tournament were required to register a squad of 22 players; only players in these squads were eligible to take part in the tournament.

Players marked in bold have been capped at full international level.

== Group A ==
=== Chile ===
Head coach: (Colombia) Bernardo Redín

No.	Pos.	Player	Date of birth (age)	Club
1	GK	**Gonzalo Collao**	9 September 1997 (aged 21)	(Football Federation of Chile) Universidad de Chile
2	DF	**Nicolás Díaz**	20 May 1999 (aged 20)	(Football Federation of Chile) Palestino
3	DF	Sebastián Cabrera	16 March 1998 (aged 21)	(Football Federation of Chile) Coquimbo Unido
4	DF	**Alex Ibacache**	11 January 1999 (aged 20)	(Football Federation of Chile) Everton
5	MF	**Tomás Alarcón**	19 January 1999 (aged 20)	(Football Federation of Chile) O'Higgins
6	DF	Lucas Alarcón	5 March 2000 (aged 19)	(Football Federation of Chile) Universidad de Chile
7	MF	Ignacio Jara	28 January 1997 (aged 22)	(Football Federation of Chile) Cobreloa
8	MF	**Jimmy Martínez**	26 January 1997 (aged 22)	(Football Federation of Chile) Universidad de Chile
9	FW	**Nicolás Guerra**	9 January 1999 (aged 20)	(Football Federation of Chile) Universidad de Chile
10	MF	**Ángelo Araos**	6 January 1997 (aged 22)	(Brazilian Football Confederation) Corinthians
11	FW	**Iván Morales**	29 July 1999 (aged 19)	(Football Federation of Chile) Colo-Colo
12	GK	**Zacarías López**	30 June 1998 (aged 20)	(Football Federation of Chile) Deportes La Serena
13	FW	Mathías Pinto	13 July 1998 (aged 20)	(Football Federation of Chile) Ñublense
14	MF	**Williams Alarcón**	20 November 2000 (aged 18)	(Football Federation of Chile) Colo-Colo
15	MF	Diego Fernández	8 March 1998 (aged 21)	(Football Federation of Chile) Deportes Iquique
16	DF	**Nicolás Fernández**	3 August 1999 (aged 19)	(Football Federation of Chile) Audax Italiano
17	MF	**Gabriel Suazo**	9 August 1997 (aged 21)	(Football Federation of Chile) Colo-Colo
18	DF	Víctor Retamal	6 March 1998 (aged 21)	(Football Federation of Chile) Universidad de Concepción
19	FW	Franco Lobos	22 February 1999 (aged 20)	(Football Federation of Chile) Unión La Calera
20	MF	**Pablo Aránguiz**	17 March 1997 (aged 22)	(United States Soccer Federation) FC Dallas
21	DF	Nicolás Ramírez	1 May 1997 (aged 22)	(Football Federation of Chile) Huachipato
23	GK	Luis Ureta	8 March 1999 (aged 20)	(Football Federation of Chile) O'Higgins

=== England ===
Head coach: (England) Paul Simpson

Nathan Trott (West Ham United) and Easah Suliman (Aston Villa) were replaced by Ryan Schofield and Jamie Shackleton, respectively. Josh Dasilva was added after the original call-up.

Ryan Schofield, injured in the match against Portugal, was replaced by Nathan Bishop.

No.	Pos.	Player	Date of birth (age)	Club
1	GK	Ellery Balcombe	15 October 1999 (aged 19)	(The Football Association) Brentford
2	DF	**Reece James**	8 December 1999 (aged 19)	(The Football Association) Chelsea
3	DF	Tom Pearce	12 April 1998 (aged 21)	(The Football Association) Leeds United
4	MF	Sam Field	8 May 1998 (aged 21)	(The Football Association) West Bromwich Albion
5	DF	**Marc Guéhi**	13 July 2000 (aged 18)	(The Football Association) Chelsea
6	DF	**Trevoh Chalobah**	5 July 1999 (aged 19)	(The Football Association) Chelsea
7	FW	**Eberechi Eze**	29 June 1998 (aged 20)	(The Football Association) Queens Park Rangers
8	MF	Joe Willock	20 August 1999 (aged 19)	(The Football Association) Arsenal
9	FW	**Eddie Nketiah**	30 May 1999 (aged 20)	(The Football Association) Arsenal
10	FW	Marcus Tavernier	22 March 1999 (aged 20)	(The Football Association) Middlesbrough
11	MF	Dwight McNeil	22 November 1999 (aged 19)	(The Football Association) Burnley
12	DF	Steven Sessegnon	18 May 2000 (aged 19)	(The Football Association) Fulham
13	GK	Ryan Schofield	11 December 1999 (aged 19)	(The Football Association) Huddersfield Town
13*	GK	Nathan Bishop	15 October 1999 (aged 19)	(The Football Association) Southend United
14	FW	**George Hirst**	15 February 1999 (aged 20)	(Royal Belgian Football Association) OH Leuven
15	MF	**Conor Gallagher**	6 February 2000 (aged 19)	(The Football Association) Chelsea
16	FW	Kyle Edwards	17 February 1998 (aged 21)	(The Football Association) West Bromwich Albion
17	DF	Jayden Bogle	27 July 2000 (aged 18)	(The Football Association) Derby County
18	DF	Max Lowe	11 May 1997 (aged 22)	(The Football Association) Derby County
19	MF	Josh Sims	28 March 1997 (aged 22)	(The Football Association) Southampton
20	MF	Josh Dasilva	23 October 1998 (aged 20)	(The Football Association) Brentford
21	FW	**Danny Loader**	28 August 2000 (aged 18)	(The Football Association) Reading
22	MF	Jamie Shackleton	8 October 1999 (aged 19)	(The Football Association) Leeds United

=== Japan ===
Head coach: (Japan) Akinobu Yokouchi

No.	Pos.	Player	Date of birth (age)	Club
1	GK	Powell Obinna Obi	18 December 1997 (aged 21)	(Japan Football Association) Ryutsu Keizai University
2	DF	**Taiyo Koga**	28 October 1998 (aged 20)	(Japan Football Association) Kashiwa Reysol
3	DF	Keiya Shiihashi	20 June 1997 (aged 21)	(Japan Football Association) Vegalta Sendai
4	MF	**Ao Tanaka**	10 September 1998 (aged 20)	(Japan Football Association) Kawasaki Frontale
5	DF	**Takuma Ominami**	13 December 1997 (aged 21)	(Japan Football Association) Júbilo Iwata
6	MF	Yoichi Naganuma	14 April 1997 (aged 22)	(Japan Football Association) Ehime FC
7	MF	Tatsuya Itō	26 June 1997 (aged 21)	(German Football Association) Hamburger SV
8	MF	**Kaoru Mitoma**	20 May 1997 (aged 22)	(Japan Football Association) University of Tsukuba
9	FW	**Koki Ogawa**	8 August 1997 (aged 21)	(Japan Football Association) Júbilo Iwata
10	MF	Yuta Kamiya	24 April 1997 (aged 22)	(Japan Football Association) Ehime FC
11	FW	**Reo Hatate**	21 November 1997 (aged 21)	(Japan Football Association) Juntendo University
12	GK	Louis Yamaguchi	28 May 1998 (aged 19)	(Royal Spanish Football Federation) Extremadura UD
13	MF	**Yuto Iwasaki**	11 June 1998 (aged 20)	(Japan Football Association) Hokkaido Consadole Sapporo
14	MF	**Yūki Sōma**	25 February 1997 (aged 22)	(Japan Football Association) Nagoya Grampus
15	DF	Makoto Okazaki	10 October 1998 (aged 20)	(Japan Football Association) FC Tokyo
16	MF	Ayumu Kawai	12 August 1999 (aged 19)	(Japan Football Association) Renofa Yamaguchi FC
17	MF	Takahiro Ko	20 April 1998 (aged 21)	(Japan Football Association) Gamba Osaka
18	FW	Ren Komatsu	10 September 1998 (aged 20)	(Japan Football Association) Zweigen Kanazawa
19	MF	Kakeru Funaki	13 April 1998 (aged 21)	(Japan Football Association) Cerezo Osaka
20	MF	Daiki Matsuoka	1 June 2001 (aged 18)	(Japan Football Association) Sagan Tosu
21	GK	Go Hatano	25 May 1998 (aged 21)	(Japan Football Association) FC Tokyo
22	DF	**Shunta Tanaka**	26 May 1997 (aged 22)	(Japan Football Association) Osaka University of H&SS

=== Portugal ===
Head coach: (Portugal) Filipe Ramos

Diogo Capitão (Benfica) and Rafael Camacho (Liverpool) were replaced by Samuel Costa and Bernardo Sousa, respectively.

Celton Biai, injured in the match against Chile, was replaced by Francisco Meixedo.

No.	Pos.	Player	Date of birth (age)	Club
1	GK	**Celton Biai**	13 August 2000 (aged 18)	(Portuguese Football Federation) Benfica
1*	GK	Francisco Meixedo	19 May 2001 (aged 18)	(Portuguese Football Federation) Porto
2	DF	Costinha	26 March 2000 (aged 19)	(Portuguese Football Federation) Rio Ave
3	DF	Pedro Álvaro	2 March 2000 (aged 19)	(Portuguese Football Federation) Benfica
4	DF	Gonçalo Loureiro	1 February 2000 (aged 19)	(Portuguese Football Federation) Benfica
5	DF	**Nuno Tavares**	26 January 2000 (aged 19)	(Portuguese Football Federation) Benfica
6	MF	**Samú Costa**	27 November 2000 (aged 18)	(Portuguese Football Federation) Braga
7	FW	Umaro Embaló	6 May 2001 (aged 18)	(Portuguese Football Federation) Benfica
8	MF	Romário Baró	25 January 2000 (aged 19)	(Portuguese Football Federation) Porto
9	MF	**Gonçalo Ramos**	20 June 2001 (aged 17)	(Portuguese Football Federation) Benfica
10	MF	Tiago Dantas	24 December 2000 (aged 18)	(Portuguese Football Federation) Benfica
11	MF	Bernardo Sousa	27 March 2000 (aged 19)	(Portuguese Football Federation) Sporting CP
12	GK	João Valido	3 March 2000 (aged 19)	(Portuguese Football Federation) Vitória de Setúbal
13	DF	Pedro Ganchas	31 May 2000 (aged 19)	(Portuguese Football Federation) Benfica
14	DF	Tomás Tavares	7 March 2001 (aged 18)	(Portuguese Football Federation) Benfica
15	MF	**Vitinha**	13 February 2000 (aged 19)	(Portuguese Football Federation) Porto
16	MF	Fábio Vieira	30 May 2000 (aged 19)	(Portuguese Football Federation) Porto
17	MF	Rodrigo Fernandes	23 March 2001 (aged 18)	(Portuguese Football Federation) Sporting CP
18	FW	**João Mário**	3 January 2000 (aged 19)	(Portuguese Football Federation) Porto
19	DF	Gonçalo Cardoso	21 October 2000 (aged 18)	(Portuguese Football Federation) Boavista
20	FW	Félix Correia	22 January 2001 (aged 18)	(Portuguese Football Federation) Sporting CP
21	DF	Tiago Lopes	27 May 2000 (aged 19)	(Portuguese Football Federation) Porto
22	FW	Marcos Paulo	1 February 2001 (aged 18)	(Brazilian Football Confederation) Fluminense

== Group B ==
=== Brazil ===
Head coach: (Brazil) André Jardine

Luiz Felipe (Lazio), who withdrew injured, was replaced by Adryelson. CBF suspended, until the end of the tournament, Renan Lodi (Athletico Paranaense) and Rodrygo (Santos) after they were called-up and did not attend. They were replaced by Rogério and Paulinho, respectively. Gabriel Magalhães and Thiago Maia (Lille) were released by CBF. They were replaced by Bruno Fuchs and Lucas Fernandes, respectively.

No.	Pos.	Player	Date of birth (age)	Club
1	GK	Ivan	2 July 1997 (aged 21)	(Brazilian Football Confederation) Ponte Preta
2	DF	**Emerson Royal**	14 January 1999 (aged 20)	(Royal Spanish Football Federation) Betis
3	DF	Lyanco	1 February 1997 (aged 22)	(Italian Football Federation) Bologna
4	DF	Murilo	27 March 1997 (aged 22)	(Brazilian Football Confederation) Cruzeiro
5	MF	**Douglas Luiz**	9 May 1998 (aged 21)	(Royal Spanish Football Federation) Girona
6	DF	Iago	23 March 1997 (aged 22)	(Brazilian Football Confederation) Internacional
7	FW	**Antony**	24 February 2000 (aged 19)	(Brazilian Football Confederation) São Paulo
8	MF	Wendel	28 August 1997 (aged 21)	(Portuguese Football Federation) Sporting CP
9	FW	**Pedro**	20 June 1997 (aged 21)	(Brazilian Football Confederation) Fluminense
10	MF	Mateus Vital	12 February 1998 (aged 21)	(Brazilian Football Confederation) Corinthians
11	MF	Bruno Tabata	30 March 1997 (aged 22)	(Portuguese Football Federation) Portimonense
12	GK	Lucas Perri	10 December 1997 (aged 21)	(The Football Association) Crystal Palace
13	DF	Guga	29 August 1998 (aged 20)	(Brazilian Football Confederation) Atlético Mineiro
14	DF	Adryelson	23 March 1998 (aged 21)	(Brazilian Football Confederation) Sport
15	DF	Bruno Fuchs	1 April 1999 (aged 20)	(Brazilian Football Confederation) Internacional
16	DF	Rogério	13 January 1998 (aged 21)	(Italian Football Federation) Sassuolo
17	FW	Pedrinho	13 April 1998 (aged 21)	(Brazilian Football Confederation) Corinthians
18	MF	**Matheus Henrique**	19 December 1997 (aged 21)	(Brazilian Football Confederation) Grêmio
19	FW	**Matheus Cunha**	27 May 1999 (aged 20)	(German Football Association) RB Leipzig
20	MF	Lucas Fernandes	20 September 1997 (aged 21)	(Portuguese Football Federation) Portimonense
22	GK	Lucão	26 February 2001 (aged 18)	(Brazilian Football Confederation) Vasco da Gama
33	FW	**Paulinho**	15 July 2000 (aged 18)	(German Football Association) Bayer Leverkusen

=== France ===
Head coach: (France) Jean-Luc Vannuchi

Lévi Ntumba (Dijon) was replaced by Hugo Barbet. Bilal Benkhedim was added after the original call-up.

No.	Pos.	Player	Date of birth (age)	Club
1	GK	**Lucas Chevalier**	6 November 2001 (aged 17)	(French Football Federation) Lille
2	DF	Yann Godart	19 September 2001 (aged 17)	(French Football Federation) Metz
3	DF	**Rayan Aït-Nouri**	6 June 2001 (aged 17)	(French Football Federation) Angers
4	DF	Bafodé Diakité	6 January 2001 (aged 18)	(French Football Federation) Toulouse
5	DF	Loïc Mbe Soh	13 June 2001 (aged 17)	(French Football Federation) Paris Saint-Germain
6	MF	Anthony Gomez Mancini	6 April 2001 (aged 18)	(French Football Federation) Angers
7	FW	Adil Taoui	10 August 2001 (aged 17)	(French Football Federation) Toulouse
8	MF	Koba Koindredi	27 October 2001 (aged 17)	(Royal Spanish Football Federation) Valencia
9	FW	Bilal Benkhedim	20 April 2001 (aged 18)	(French Football Federation) Saint-Étienne
10	MF	Han-Noah Massengo	7 July 2001 (aged 17)	(French Football Federation) Monaco
11	MF	**Michael Olise**	12 December 2001 (aged 17)	(The Football Association) Reading
12	DF	Alexis Beka Beka	29 March 2001 (aged 18)	(French Football Federation) Caen
13	DF	**Arthur Zagre**	4 October 2001 (aged 17)	(French Football Federation) Paris Saint-Germain
14	DF	Théo Barbet	6 March 2001 (aged 18)	(French Football Federation) Dijon
15	MF	**Tom Rapnouil**	9 February 2001 (aged 18)	(French Football Federation) Toulouse
16	GK	Hugo Barbet	22 November 2001 (aged 17)	(French Football Federation) Guingamp
17	MF	**Evann Guessand**	1 July 2001 (aged 17)	(French Football Federation) Nice
18	MF	Naël Jaby	20 April 2001 (aged 18)	(French Football Federation) Clermont
19	FW	Darell Tokpa	2 June 2001 (aged 17)	(French Football Federation) Amiens
20	FW	El Hadj Coly	5 July 2001 (aged 17)	(French Football Federation) Lyon
21	FW	**Ulrick Eneme Ella**	22 May 2001 (aged 18)	(Austrian Football Association) Liefering

=== Guatemala ===
Head coach: (Guatemala) Érick González

No.	Pos.	Player	Date of birth (age)	Club
1	GK	Mario Mendoza	22 July 1998 (aged 20)	(National Football Federation of Guatemala) Deportivo Nueva Concepción
2	DF	Dany Rodas	22 November 1999 (aged 19)	(National Football Federation of Guatemala) Deportivo Reu
3	DF	**José Ardón**	20 January 2000 (aged 19)	(National Football Federation of Guatemala) Antigua GFC
4	DF	Uzias Hernández	20 July 1997 (aged 21)	(National Football Federation of Guatemala) Suchitepéquez
5	MF	Durban Reyes	29 April 1997 (aged 22)	(National Football Federation of Guatemala) Malacateco
6	MF	Julio Fajardo	3 February 1997 (aged 22)	(National Football Federation of Guatemala) Deportivo Mixco
7	MF	**Esteban Gabriel García**	6 March 1998 (aged 21)	(National Football Federation of Guatemala) Deportivo Reu
8	DF	**Rudy Barrientos**	1 March 1999 (aged 20)	(National Football Federation of Guatemala) Guastatoya
9	FW	**José Carlos Martínez**	10 October 1997 (aged 21)	(National Football Federation of Guatemala) Municipal
10	MF	**Pedro Altán**	4 June 1997 (aged 21)	(National Football Federation of Guatemala) Sanarate
11	MF	**John Méndez**	24 June 1999 (aged 19)	(National Football Federation of Guatemala) Municipal
12	GK	Brayan Aroche	5 March 2000 (aged 19)	(National Football Federation of Guatemala) Guastatoya
13	DF	**Denilson Hernández**	12 August 1997 (aged 21)	(National Football Federation of Guatemala) Municipal
14	DF	**Carlos Estrada**	12 September 1997 (aged 21)	(National Football Federation of Guatemala) Comunicaciones
15	MF	**Allen Yanes**	4 July 1997 (aged 21)	(United States Soccer Federation) New York Red Bulls II
16	FW	**Yonatan Pozuelos**	28 July 1997 (aged 21)	(National Football Federation of Guatemala) Deportivo Carchá
17	DF	**Óscar Castellanos**	18 January 2000 (aged 19)	(National Football Federation of Guatemala) Antigua GFC
18	MF	**Esnaydi Zúñiga**	12 October 1999 (aged 19)	(National Football Federation of Guatemala) Petapa
19	FW	Oliver Díaz	4 January 1998 (aged 21)	(National Football Federation of Guatemala) Comunicaciones
20	FW	Héctor Morales	13 March 1998 (aged 21)	(National Football Federation of Guatemala) Municipal
21	GK	Arnold Barrios	16 December 1998 (aged 20)	(National Football Federation of Guatemala) Comunicaciones

=== Qatar ===
Head coach: (Spain) Albert Fernández Caballería

No.	Pos.	Player	Date of birth (age)	Club
1	GK	**Meshaal Barsham**	14 February 1998 (aged 21)	(Qatar Football Association) Al Sadd
2	MF	Sayed Issa	14 September 1997 (aged 21)	(Qatar Football Association) Al Khor
3	DF	Elias Ahmed	12 December 1997 (aged 21)	(Qatar Football Association) Al Gharafa
4	DF	**Bahaa Ellethy**	18 April 1999 (aged 20)	(Qatar Football Association) Al Sadd
5	DF	Hatim Kamal Hassanin	9 May 1997 (aged 22)	(Qatar Football Association) Al Sadd
6	MF	Ibrahim Masoud	25 November 1997 (aged 21)	(Qatar Football Association) Al Rayyan
7	MF	**Hazem Shehata**	2 February 1998 (aged 21)	(Qatar Football Association) Al Duhail
8	MF	Adel Bader	17 January 1997 (aged 22)	(Qatar Football Association) Al Sailiya
9	FW	Hassan Palang	2 April 1998 (aged 21)	(Qatar Football Association) Al Sadd
10	MF	Nasser Al Ahrak	5 January 1999 (aged 20)	(Qatar Football Association) Al Gharafa
11	FW	**Amro Surag**	8 April 1998 (aged 21)	(Qatar Football Association) Al Gharafa
12	DF	Khalaf Saad	2 March 1998 (aged 21)	(Qatar Football Association) Al Arabi
13	DF	Mouafak Awad	11 May 1997 (aged 22)	(Qatar Football Association) Al Rayyan
14	FW	Salmin Atiq	11 January 1997 (aged 22)	(Qatar Football Association) Al Duhail
15	DF	Hussain Bahzad	8 April 1998 (aged 21)	(Qatar Football Association) Al Sadd
16	FW	Mohammad Abu Shanab	25 August 1998 (aged 20)	(Qatar Football Association) Al Gharafa
17	FW	**Abdelrahman Moustafa**	5 April 1997 (aged 22)	(Qatar Football Association) Al Ahli
19	DF	**Ahmed Al-Hamawende**	8 February 1999 (aged 20)	(Qatar Football Association) Al Ahli
20	FW	**Khalid Muneer**	24 February 1998 (aged 21)	(Qatar Football Association) Al Duhail
21	GK	Yazan Naim	5 June 1997 (aged 21)	(Qatar Football Association) Al Ahli
	MF	**Mohammed Waad**	18 September 1999 (aged 19)	(Qatar Football Association) Al Ahli
	MF	Andri Syahputra	29 June 1999 (aged 19)	(Qatar Football Association) Al Gharafa

== Group C ==
=== Bahrain ===
Head coach: (Tunisia) Samir Chammam

No.	Pos.	Player	Date of birth (age)	Club
1	GK	**Ammar Mohamed Abbas**	10 February 1999 (aged 20)	(Bahrain Football Association) Manama
2	DF	Sayed Mohammed Ameen	7 March 1999 (aged 20)	(Bahrain Football Association) Sitra
3	DF	**Ahmed Bughammar**	30 December 1997 (aged 21)	(Bahrain Football Association) Al-Hidd
4	DF	Hussain Al-Sabba	3 October 1997 (aged 21)	(Malta Football Association) Birkirkara
5	MF	**Abbas Al-Asfoor**	2 March 1999 (aged 20)	(Bahrain Football Association) Al-Shabab
6	DF	**Husain Abbas Alkhayyat**	15 October 1997 (aged 21)	(Bahrain Football Association) East Riffa
7	FW	Hasan Jaafar Madan	27 October 1998 (aged 20)	(Bahrain Football Association) Al-Shabab
8	MF	**Mohamed Marhoon**	12 February 1998 (aged 21)	(Football Association of the Czech Republic) Bohemians 1905
9	FW	Ahmed Saleh Sanad	11 January 1998 (aged 21)	(Bahrain Football Association) Isa Town
10	MF	**Mohammed Al-Hardan**	6 October 1997 (aged 21)	(Hellenic Football Federation) Aiginiakos
11	FW	**Ahmed Al-Sherooqi**	22 May 2000 (aged 19)	(Malta Football Association) Birkirkara
12	MF	**Jasim Khelaif**	22 February 1998 (aged 21)	(Bahrain Football Association) East Riffa
13	FW	Sayed Ebrahim Alawi Khalil	25 October 1997 (aged 21)	(Bahrain Football Association) Al-Ahli
14	DF	Ahmed Habib Ali	29 September 1998 (aged 20)	(Bahrain Football Association) Malkiya
15	MF	Mohamed Naseem Alshamsi	8 January 1998 (aged 21)	(Bahrain Football Association) Al-Muharraq
16	FW	**Sayed Hashim Isa**	3 April 1998 (aged 21)	(Bahrain Football Association) Malkiya
18	FW	Adnan Fawaz Alshirah	30 October 1999 (aged 19)	(Bahrain Football Association) Al-Riffa
19	MF	Abdulrahman Mohamed Ahmedi	16 April 1998 (aged 21)	(Bahrain Football Association) Al-Muharraq
20	DF	Salem Adel Salman Hasan	3 July 1997 (aged 21)	(Bahrain Football Association) Al-Najma
21	GK	Yusuf Habib Mansoor	9 January 1998 (aged 21)	(Bahrain Football Association) Malkiya
23	GK	Abdulaziz Al Kandari	16 September 1997 (aged 21)	(Bahrain Football Association) Isa Town
24	DF	Jasim Mohamed Noor	5 January 1999 (aged 20)	(Bahrain Football Association) Al-Riffa

=== China PR ===
Head coach: (Netherlands) Guus Hiddink

No.	Pos.	Player	Date of birth (age)	Club
1	GK	Chen Wei	14 February 1998 (aged 21)	(Chinese Football Association) Shanghai SIPG
2	DF	Tong Lei	16 December 1997 (aged 21)	(Chinese Football Association) Zhejiang Greentown
3	DF	Huang Chuang	2 January 1997 (aged 22)	(Chinese Football Association) Henan Jianye
4	DF	**Wu Shaocong**	20 March 2000 (aged 19)	(Japan Football Association) Kyoto Sanga
5	DF	**Li Yang**	22 July 1997 (aged 21)	(Portuguese Football Federation) Vitória de Guimarães
6	MF	Wu Wei	5 February 1997 (aged 22)	(Chinese Football Association) Tianjin Tianhai
7	FW	**Lin Liangming**	4 June 1997 (aged 21)	(Royal Spanish Football Federation) Almería
8	DF	**Wen Jiabao**	2 January 1999 (aged 20)	(Chinese Football Association) Tianjin Tianhai
9	FW	Shan Huanhuan	24 January 1999 (aged 20)	(Portuguese Football Federation) Vitória de Guimarães
10	FW	Hu Jinghang	23 March 1997 (aged 22)	(Chinese Football Association) Shanghai SIPG
11	MF	**Chen Binbin**	10 June 1998 (aged 20)	(Chinese Football Association) Shanghai SIPG
12	GK	Guo Quanbo	31 August 1997 (aged 21)	(Chinese Football Association) Beijing Sinobo Guoan
13	DF	Guo Jing	24 February 1997 (aged 22)	(Chinese Football Association) Inner Mongolia Zhongyou
14	DF	Feng Boxuan	18 March 1997 (aged 22)	(Chinese Football Association) Guangzhou Evergrande Taobao
15	DF	Yao Daogang	1 September 1997 (aged 21)	(Portuguese Football Federation) Gondomar
16	MF	Cheng Hui	2 August 1997 (aged 21)	(Royal Spanish Football Federation) Lleida Esportiu
17	MF	Jiang Zejun	20 October 1997 (aged 21)	(Portuguese Football Federation) Gondomar
18	MF	Huang Cong	6 January 1997 (aged 22)	(Chinese Football Association) Shandong Luneng Taishan
19	MF	Lei Wenjie	10 January 1997 (aged 22)	(Chinese Football Association) Shanghai SIPG
20	MF	**Cao Yongjing**	15 February 1997 (aged 22)	(Chinese Football Association) Beijing Renhe
21	MF	Yan Dinghao	6 April 1998 (aged 21)	(Chinese Football Association) Guangzhou Evergrande Taobao
22	GK	Kudirat Ablet	5 February 1997 (aged 22)	(Portuguese Football Federation) Gondomar

=== Mexico ===
Head coach: (Mexico) Jaime Lozano

No.	Pos.	Player	Date of birth (age)	Club
1	GK	Sebastián Jurado	28 September 1997 (aged 21)	(Mexican Football Federation) Veracruz
2	DF	**Alan Mozo**	5 April 1997 (aged 22)	(Mexican Football Federation) UNAM
3	DF	**Ismael Govea**	20 February 1997 (aged 22)	(Mexican Football Federation) Atlas
4	DF	**Jesús Angulo**	30 January 1998 (aged 21)	(Mexican Football Federation) Santos Laguna
5	DF	**Cristian Calderón**	24 May 1997 (aged 22)	(Mexican Football Federation) Necaxa
6	MF	**Érick Aguirre**	23 February 1997 (aged 22)	(Mexican Football Federation) Pachuca
7	FW	**Paolo Yrizar**	6 August 1997 (aged 21)	(Mexican Football Federation) Querétaro
8	MF	Pablo López	7 January 1998 (aged 21)	(Mexican Football Federation) Pachuca
9	FW	**Jesús Godínez**	20 January 1997 (aged 22)	(Mexican Football Federation) Guadalajara
10	MF	**Sebastián Córdova**	12 June 1997 (aged 21)	(Mexican Football Federation) América
11	FW	Ulises Cardona	13 November 1998 (aged 20)	(Mexican Football Federation) Atlas
12	GK	José Hernández	1 May 1997 (aged 22)	(Mexican Football Federation) Atlas
13	DF	Brayton Vázquez	5 March 1998 (aged 21)	(Mexican Football Federation) Atlas
14	DF	Adrián Mora	15 August 1997 (aged 21)	(Mexican Football Federation) Toluca
15	DF	**Gerardo Arteaga**	7 September 1998 (aged 20)	(Mexican Football Federation) Santos Laguna
16	DF	**Joaquín Esquivel**	7 January 1998 (aged 21)	(Mexican Football Federation) BUAP
17	MF	**Fernando Beltrán**	8 May 1998 (aged 21)	(Mexican Football Federation) Guadalajara
18	MF	Alan Medina	19 August 1997 (aged 21)	(Mexican Football Federation) Toluca
19	MF	**Marcel Ruiz**	26 October 2000 (aged 18)	(Mexican Football Federation) Querétaro
20	MF	**Jairo Torres**	5 July 2000 (aged 18)	(Mexican Football Federation) Atlas
21	FW	**Eduardo Aguirre**	3 August 1998 (aged 20)	(Mexican Football Federation) Santos Laguna
22	FW	Ronaldo Cisneros	8 January 1997 (aged 22)	(Mexican Football Federation) Guadalajara

=== Republic of Ireland ===
Head coach: (Republic of Ireland) Stephen Kenny

Neil Farrugia (UCD) was replaced by Josh Barrett.

No.	Pos.	Player	Date of birth (age)	Club
1	GK	**Caoimhín Kelleher**	23 November 1998 (aged 20)	(The Football Association) Liverpool
2	DF	**Lee O'Connor**	28 July 2000 (aged 18)	(The Football Association) Manchester United
3	DF	Darragh Leahy	15 April 1998 (aged 21)	(Football Association of Ireland) Bohemians
4	DF	Conor Masterson	8 September 1998 (aged 20)	(The Football Association) Liverpool
5	DF	**Dara O'Shea**	4 March 1999 (aged 20)	(The Football Association) West Bromwich Albion
6	MF	**Conor Coventry**	25 March 2000 (aged 19)	(The Football Association) West Ham United
7	MF	Zack Elbouzedi	5 April 1998 (aged 21)	(Football Association of Ireland) Waterford
8	MF	**Jayson Molumby**	6 August 1999 (aged 19)	(The Football Association) Brighton & Hove Albion
9	FW	**Adam Idah**	11 February 2001 (aged 18)	(The Football Association) Norwich City
10	MF	Connor Ronan	6 March 1998 (aged 21)	(The Football Association) Wolverhampton Wanderers
11	MF	Josh Barrett	21 June 1998 (aged 20)	(The Football Association) Reading
12	DF	Canice Carroll	26 January 1999 (aged 20)	(The Football Association) Brentford
14	MF	Jamie Lennon	9 May 1998 (aged 21)	(Football Association of Ireland) St Patrick's Athletic
15	FW	**Aaron Connolly**	28 January 2000 (aged 19)	(The Football Association) Brighton & Hove Albion
16	MF	**Jack Taylor**	23 June 1998 (aged 20)	(The Football Association) Barnet
17	MF	Stephen Mallon	7 February 1999 (aged 20)	(The Football Association) Sheffield United
18	MF	Simon Power	13 May 1998 (aged 21)	(The Football Association) Norwich City
19	FW	Aaron Drinan	6 May 1998 (aged 21)	(The Football Association) Ipswich Town
20	DF	Tyreke Wilson	2 December 1999 (aged 19)	(The Football Association) Manchester City
21	DF	**Liam Scales**	8 August 1998 (aged 20)	(Football Association of Ireland) UCD
22	MF	**Jason Knight**	13 February 2001 (aged 18)	(The Football Association) Derby County
23	GK	Conor Kearns	6 May 1998 (aged 21)	(Football Association of Ireland) UCD
