= 2019 Toulon Tournament =

47ème Festival International "Espoirs" – Tournoi Maurice Revello (in French)

Tournament details
- Host country: France
- Dates: 1–15 June 2019
- Teams: 12 (from 4 confederations)
- Venues: 5 (in 5 host cities)

Final positions
- Champions: Brazil (9th title)
- Runners-up: Japan
- Third place: Mexico
- Fourth place: Republic of Ireland

Tournament statistics
- Matches played: 26
- Goals scored: 74 (2.85 per match)
- Top scorer: (Brazil) Matheus Cunha (4 goals)
- Best player: (Brazil) Douglas Luiz
- Best goalkeeper: (China) Chen Wei

The 2019 Toulon Tournament (officially French: 47ème Festival International "Espoirs" – Tournoi Maurice Revello) was the 47th edition of the Toulon Tournament. It was held in the department of Bouches-du-Rhône from 1 to 15 June 2019. England were the defending champions but they were eliminated in the group stage.

In this season the tournament was contested by under-22 national teams, although France, Portugal, England and Republic of Ireland played with their under-18, under-19, under-20 and under-21 teams, respectively.

Brazil won their ninth title by defeating Japan 5–4 in a penalty shoot-out in the final, after the match had finished in a 1–1 draw.

== Participants ==
Twelve participating teams were announced in March and April 2019.

AFC

- Bahrain (2nd participation)
- China (13th participation)
- Japan (14th participation)
- Qatar (6th participation)

CONCACAF

- Guatemala (1st participation)
- Mexico (25th participation)

CONMEBOL

- Brazil (17th participation)
- Chile (5th participation)

UEFA

- England^{TH} (21st participation)
- France (42nd participation)
- Portugal (30th participation)
- Republic of Ireland (7th participation)

== Venues ==
A total of five cities hosted the tournament.

Initially, Stade Marcel Cerdan (Carnoux-en-Provence) would host the ninth-place and seventh-place playoffs but the matches originally to be played there would be moved to Stade d'Honneur (Mallemort) and Stade Parsemain (Fos-sur-Mer).

2019 Toulon Tournament is located in Provence-Alpes-Côte d'Azur
| Aubagne | Carnoux-en-Provence | Fos-sur-Mer |
| Stade de Lattre-de-Tassigny | Stade Marcel Cerdan | Stade Parsemain |
| 43.2939695°N 5.5623227°E | 43.250270°N 5.552645°E | 43.4687854°N 4.9489821°E |
| Capacity: 1,000 | Capacity: 1,700 | Capacity: 17,170 |
| Mallemort | Salon-de-Provence | Vitrolles |
| Stade d'Honneur | Stade d'Honneur Marcel Roustan | Stade Jules-Ladoumègue |
| 43.7241096°N 5.1774767°E | 43.6356163°N 5.0928964°E | 43.4578485°N 5.2433091°E |
| Capacity: 720 | Capacity: 4,000 | Capacity: 1,500 |

== Match officials ==
The referees were:

(Azerbaijan) Aliyar Aghayev

Assistants: Zeynal Zeynalov and Akif Amirali

(Chile) Felipe González Alveal

Assistants: Raúl Orellana and Alejandro Molina

(France) Willy Delajod

Assistants: Aurélien Berthomieu and Philippe Jeanne

(Malta) Alex Johnson

Assistants: Edward Spiteri and Theodore Zammit

(Mexico) Luis Enrique Santander

Assistants: Christian Espinosa and Michel Alejandro Morales

(Portugal) António Nobre

Assistants: Pedro Mota and Nuno Pereira

(Qatar) Salman Falahi

Assistants: Yousuf Al-Shamari and Zahy Alshammari

(Republic of Ireland) Robert Hennessy

Assistants: Emmett Dynan and Robert Clarke

(Romania) Horațiu Feșnic

Assistants: Alexandru Cerei and Mihai Marius Marica

== Matches rules ==
Every match consisted of two periods of 45 minutes each. In a match, every team had eleven named substitutes and the maximum number of substitutions permitted was four (a fifth substitution was allowed only for goalkeepers).

In the knockout stage, if a game tied at the end of regulation time, extra time would not be played and the penalty shoot-out would be used to determine the winner.

== Group stage ==
The draw was held on 8 April 2019. The twelve teams were drawn into three groups of four. In the group stage, each group was played on a round-robin basis. The teams were ranked according to points (3 points for a win, 1 point for a draw, and 0 points for a loss). If tied on points, the following criteria would be used to determine the ranking: 1. Goal difference; 2. Goals scored; 3. Fair play points. The group winners and the best runners-up qualified for the semi-finals. The Group stage was played from 1 to 9 June 2019.

=== Group A ===
| Pos | Team | Pld | W | D | L | GF | GA | GD | Pts | Qualification |
|---|---|---|---|---|---|---|---|---|---|---|
| 1 | Japan | 3 | 2 | 0 | 1 | 8 | 3 | +5 | 6 | Advance to knockout stage |
| 2 | Portugal | 3 | 2 | 0 | 1 | 4 | 3 | +1 | 6 | |
| 3 | Chile | 3 | 2 | 0 | 1 | 4 | 7 | −3 | 6 | |
| 4 | England | 3 | 0 | 0 | 3 | 4 | 7 | −3 | 0 | |

Source: Toulon Tournament

All times are local CEST

1 June 2019
15:05

| England | 1–2 | Japan |
|---|---|---|
| Chalobah 38' | Report | Ominami 47'; Naganuma 68' |

Stade de Lattre-de-Tassigny, Aubagne
Referee: Felipe González Alveal (Chile)
1 June 2019
17:30

| Portugal | 0–1 | Chile |
|---|---|---|
| | Report | Pinto 13' |

Stade de Lattre-de-Tassigny, Aubagne
Referee: Salman Falahi (Qatar)

4 June 2019
16:05

| Japan | 6–1 | Chile |
|---|---|---|
| Mitoma 7'; Hatate 12', 18', 63'; Iwasaki 39', 45+1' | Report | Araos 35' |

Stade d'Honneur Marcel Roustan, Salon-de-Provence
Referee: Robert Hennessy (Republic of Ireland)
4 June 2019
19:00

| England | 2–3 | Portugal |
|---|---|---|
| Nketiah 8'; Willock 87' | Report | Marcos Paulo 21'; Gonçalo Cardoso 39'; Félix Correia 42' |

Stade d'Honneur Marcel Roustan, Salon-de-Provence
Referee: Horațiu Feșnic (Romania)

7 June 2019
17:05

| Portugal | 1–0 | Japan |
|---|---|---|
| Umaro Embaló 85' | Report |

Stade Parsemain, Fos-sur-Mer
Referee: Aliyar Aghayev (Azerbaijan)
7 June 2019
20:30

| Chile | 2–1 | England |
|---|---|---|
| Jara 87'; Guéhi 90+2' (o.g.) | Report | Willock 45+6' |

Stade Parsemain, Fos-sur-Mer
Referee: Salman Falahi (Qatar)

=== Group B ===
| Pos | Team | Pld | W | D | L | GF | GA | GD | Pts | Qualification |
|---|---|---|---|---|---|---|---|---|---|---|
| 1 | Brazil | 3 | 3 | 0 | 0 | 13 | 0 | +13 | 9 | Advance to knockout stage |
| 2 | France (H) | 3 | 2 | 0 | 1 | 4 | 5 | −1 | 6 | |
| 3 | Guatemala | 3 | 1 | 0 | 2 | 3 | 6 | −3 | 3 | |
| 4 | Qatar | 3 | 0 | 0 | 3 | 0 | 9 | −9 | 0 | |

Source: Toulon Tournament
(H) Hosts

All times are local CEST

2 June 2019
15:30

| France | 2–0 | Qatar |
|---|---|---|
| Godart 42'; Taoui 90+2' (pen.) | Report |

Stade de Lattre-de-Tassigny, Aubagne
Referee: Luis Enrique Santander (Mexico)
2 June 2019
19:00

| Brazil | 4–0 | Guatemala |
|---|---|---|
| Pedrinho 19'; Bruno Tabata 23'; Wendel 85'; Douglas Luiz 89' (pen.) | Report |

Stade de Lattre-de-Tassigny, Aubagne
Referee: Willy Delajod (France)

5 June 2019
17:00

| Qatar | 0–2 | Guatemala |
|---|---|---|
| | Report | Barrientos 48' (pen.); Ardón 88' |

Stade d'Honneur Marcel Roustan, Salon-de-Provence
Referee: Alex Johnson (Malta)
5 June 2019
19:30

| France | 0–4 | Brazil |
|---|---|---|
| | Report | Antony 20'; Matheus Henrique 57'; Matheus Cunha 88' (pen.); Mateus Vital 90+1' |

Stade d'Honneur Marcel Roustan, Salon-de-Provence
Referee: Luis Enrique Santander (Mexico)

8 June 2019
15:00

| France | 2–1 | Guatemala |
|---|---|---|
| Tokpa 49'; Estrada 72' (o.g.) | Report | Reyes 59' (pen.) |

Stade Jules-Ladoumègue, Vitrolles
Referee: Robert Hennessy (Republic of Ireland)
8 June 2019
17:30

| Brazil | 5–0 | Qatar |
|---|---|---|
| Matheus Cunha 21', 83'; Mateus Vital 24' (pen.); Paulinho 38', 76' | Report |

Stade Jules-Ladoumègue, Vitrolles
Referee: António Nobre (Portugal)

=== Group C ===
| Pos | Team | Pld | W | D | L | GF | GA | GD | Pts | Qualification |
|---|---|---|---|---|---|---|---|---|---|---|
| 1 | Republic of Ireland | 3 | 2 | 1 | 0 | 5 | 1 | +4 | 7 | Advance to knockout stage |
| 2 | Mexico | 3 | 2 | 1 | 0 | 3 | 0 | +3 | 7 | Advance to knockout stage |
| 3 | China | 3 | 1 | 0 | 2 | 5 | 6 | −1 | 3 | |
| 4 | Bahrain | 3 | 0 | 0 | 3 | 1 | 7 | −6 | 0 | |

Source: Toulon Tournament

All times are local CEST

3 June 2019
15:30

| China | 1–4 | Republic of Ireland |
|---|---|---|
| Li Yang 18' | Report | Elbouzedi 1'; Connolly 5'; Idah 56' (pen.), 82' (pen.) |

Stade de Lattre-de-Tassigny, Aubagne
Referee: António Nobre (Portugal)
3 June 2019
19:00

| Mexico | 2–0 | Bahrain |
|---|---|---|
| Govea 5'; Torres 10' | Report |

Stade de Lattre-de-Tassigny, Aubagne
Referee: Aliyar Aghayev (Azerbaijan)

6 June 2019
17:00

| China | 4–1 | Bahrain |
|---|---|---|
| Shan Huanhuan 16', 26'; Hu Jinghang 79'; Lin Liangming 90' | Report | Al-Hardan 76' (pen.) |

Stade Parsemain, Fos-sur-Mer
Referee: Willy Delajod (France)
6 June 2019
19:30

| Republic of Ireland | 0–0 | Mexico |
|---|---|---|
| | Report |

Stade Parsemain, Fos-sur-Mer
Referee: Felipe González Alveal (Chile)

9 June 2019
15:00

| Bahrain | 0–1 | Republic of Ireland |
|---|---|---|
| | Report | Ronan 33' |

Stade Jules-Ladoumègue, Vitrolles
Referee: Alex Johnson (Malta)
9 June 2019
17:30

| Mexico | 1–0 | China |
|---|---|---|
| Yrizar 60' | Report |

Stade Jules-Ladoumègue, Vitrolles
Referee: Horațiu Feșnic (Romania)

== Classification matches ==
The teams that failed to reach the knock-out stage played an additional game to determine their final ranking in the competition.

All times were local CEST

=== Eleventh place playoff ===
11 June 2019
16:00

| Bahrain | 1–1 | Qatar |
|---|---|---|
| Hasan 28' | Report | Mazeed 67' |
Penalties
| Marhoon (penalty missed); Al-Hardan (penalty scored); Bughammar (penalty scored); Isa (penalty missed) | 2–4 | (penalty scored) Mazeed; (penalty missed) Al Ahrak; (penalty scored) Al Ahrak; (penalty scored) Al-Hamawende; (penalty scored) Surag |

Stade d'Honneur, Mallemort
Referee: Robert Hennessy (Republic of Ireland)

=== Ninth place playoff ===
11 June 2019^{[1]}
19:00

| Guatemala | 0–4 | England |
|---|---|---|
| | Report | Hirst 15', 26'; Nketiah 23' (pen.); McNeil 29' |

Stade d'Honneur, Mallemort^{[1]}
Referee: Salman Falahi (Qatar)

^{1} Match delayed due to rain. The original date was 11 June, 16:00 at Stade Marcel Cerdan, Carnoux-en-Provence.

=== Seventh place playoff ===
13 June 2019
16:00

| Chile | 2–1 | China |
|---|---|---|
| Morales 29'; Martínez 38' | Report | Feng Boxuan 44' |

Stade Parsemain, Fos-sur-Mer^{[2]}
Referee: Alex Johnson (Malta)

^{2} Match originally scheduled at Stade Marcel Cerdan, Carnoux-en-Provence.

=== Fifth place playoff ===
12 June 2019
11:00

| Portugal | 3–0 | France |
|---|---|---|
| Gonçalo Cardoso 15'; Gonçalo Ramos 22'; Vitinha 27' (pen.) | Report |

Stade d'Honneur, Mallemort
Referee: Aliyar Aghayev (Azerbaijan)

== Knockout stage ==
Semi-finals
12 June – Aubagne
Brazil | 2
Republic of Ireland | 0
12 June – Aubagne
Japan (p) | 2 (5)
Mexico | 2 (4)

Final
15 June – Salon-de-Provence
Brazil (p) | 1 (5)
Japan | 1 (4)
Third place
15 June – Salon-de-Provence
Mexico (p) | 0 (4)
Republic of Ireland | 0 (3)

All times are local CEST

=== Semi-finals ===
12 June 2019
15:00

| Japan | 2–2 | Mexico |
|---|---|---|
| Soma 72'; Ogawa 89' | Report | Godínez 50'; Ed. Aguirre 86' |
Penalties
| Ogawa (penalty scored); Soma (penalty scored); Iwasaki (penalty scored); Naganuma (penalty scored); Hatate (penalty scored) | 5–4 | (penalty scored) Ed. Aguirre; (penalty scored) Cardona; (penalty scored) López; (penalty missed) Mozo; (penalty scored) Córdova |

Stade de Lattre-de-Tassigny, Aubagne
Referee: Horațiu Feșnic (Romania)

12 June 2019
17:30

| Brazil | 2–0 | Republic of Ireland |
|---|---|---|
| Paulinho 15'; Matheus Cunha 47' | Report |

Stade de Lattre-de-Tassigny, Aubagne
Referee: Luis Enrique Santander (Mexico)

=== Third place playoff ===
15 June 2019
13:30

| Mexico | 0–0 | Republic of Ireland |
|---|---|---|
| | Report |
Penalties
| Ed. Aguirre (penalty scored); Vázquez (penalty scored); Ér. Aguirre (penalty missed); Calderón (penalty scored); Angulo (penalty scored) | 4–3 | (penalty missed) Ronan; (penalty scored) Taylor; (penalty scored) Connolly; (penalty scored) Idah; (penalty missed) Leahy |

Stade d'Honneur Marcel Roustan, Salon-de-Provence
Referee: Felipe González Alveal (Chile)

=== Final ===
15 June 2019
16:00

| Brazil | 1–1 | Japan |
|---|---|---|
| Antony 19' | Report | Ogawa 39' |
Penalties
| Mateus Vital (penalty scored); Douglas Luiz (penalty scored); Matheus Henrique (penalty scored); Wendel (penalty scored); Lyanco (penalty scored) | 5–4 | (penalty scored) Soma; (penalty scored) Mitoma; (penalty scored) Kamiya; (penalty scored) Naganuma; (penalty missed) Hatate |

Stade d'Honneur Marcel Roustan, Salon-de-Provence
Referee: António Nobre (Portugal)

== Statistics ==
=== Goalscorers ===
There were 74 goals scored in 26 matches, for an average of 2.85 goals per match.

4 goals

- (Brazil) Matheus Cunha

3 goals

- (Brazil) Paulinho
- (Japan) Reo Hatate

2 goals

- (Brazil) Antony
- (Brazil) Mateus Vital
- (China) Shan Huanhuan
- (England) George Hirst
- (England) Eddie Nketiah
- (England) Joe Willock
- (Japan) Yuto Iwasaki
- (Japan) Koki Ogawa
- (Portugal) Gonçalo Cardoso
- (Republic of Ireland) Adam Idah

1 goal

- (Bahrain) Mohammed Al-Hardan
- (Bahrain) Salem Hasan
- (Brazil) Bruno Tabata
- (Brazil) Douglas Luiz
- (Brazil) Matheus Henrique
- (Brazil) Pedrinho
- (Brazil) Wendel
- (Chile) Ángelo Araos
- (Chile) Ignacio Jara
- (Chile) Jimmy Martínez
- (Chile) Iván Morales
- (Chile) Mathías Pinto
- (China) Feng Boxuan
- (China) Hu Jinghang
- (China) Li Yang
- (China) Lin Liangming
- (England) Trevoh Chalobah
- (England) Dwight McNeil
- (France) Yann Godart
- (France) Adil Taoui
- (France) Darell Tokpa
- (Guatemala) José Ardón
- (Guatemala) Rudy Barrientos
- (Guatemala) Durban Reyes
- (Japan) Kaoru Mitoma
- (Japan) Yoichi Naganuma
- (Japan) Takuma Ominami
- (Japan) Yuki Soma
- (Mexico) Eduardo Aguirre
- (Mexico) Jesús Godínez
- (Mexico) Ismael Govea
- (Mexico) Jairo Torres
- (Mexico) Paolo Yrizar
- (Portugal) Félix Correia
- (Portugal) Gonçalo Ramos
- (Portugal) Marcos Paulo
- (Portugal) Umaro Embaló
- (Portugal) Vitinha
- (Qatar) Khalid Muneer Mazeed
- (Republic of Ireland) Aaron Connolly
- (Republic of Ireland) Zack Elbouzedi
- (Republic of Ireland) Connor Ronan

1 own goal

- (England) Marc Guéhi (playing against Chile)
- (Guatemala) Carlos Estrada (playing against France)

=== MVP of the matchday ===
| Matchday | Group | Name | Team |
|---|---|---|---|
| 1 | A | Ao Tanaka | Japan |
| 1 | B | Douglas Luiz | Brazil |
| 1 | C | Alan Mozo | Mexico |
| 2 | A | Reo Hatate | Japan |
| 2 | B | Lyanco | Brazil |
| 2 | C | Chen Binbin | China |
| 3 | B | Matheus Cunha | Brazil |
| 3 | C | Connor Ronan | Republic of Ireland |
| 3 | C | Paolo Yrizar | Mexico |
| 4 | Semi-finals | Keiya Shiihashi | Japan |
| 4 | Semi-finals | Paulinho | Brazil |

== Awards ==
=== Individual awards ===
After the final, the following players were rewarded for their performances during the competition.

- Best player: (Brazil) Douglas Luiz
- Second best player: (Brazil) Lyanco
- Third best player: (Japan) Ao Tanaka
- Fourth best player: (Republic of Ireland) Jayson Molumby
- Breakthrough player: (Portugal) Vitinha
- Best goalkeeper: (China) Chen Wei
- Topscorer: (Brazil) Matheus Cunha
- Youngest player of the final: (Brazil) Paulinho
- Best goal of the tournament: (Brazil) Paulinho
- Fair-Play: Japan

=== Best XI ===
The best XI team was a squad consisting of the eleven most impressive players at the tournament.

| Pos. | Player |
|---|---|
| GK | (China) Chen Wei |
| DF | (Brazil) Emerson Royal |
| DF | (Brazil) Lyanco |
| DF | (Japan) Keiya Shiihashi |
| DF | (Japan) Yuki Soma |
| MF | (Japan) Ao Tanaka |
| MF | (Brazil) Douglas Luiz |
| MF | (Portugal) Vitinha |
| FW | (Brazil) Antony |
| FW | (Brazil) Matheus Cunha |
| FW | (Brazil) Paulinho |

== See also ==
- 2019 Sud Ladies Cup
