= 2018 Toulon Tournament =

46ème Festival International "Espoirs" – Tournoi Maurice Revello (in French)

Tournament details
- Host country: France
- Dates: 26 May – 9 June 2018
- Teams: 12 (from 4 confederations)
- Venues: 7 (in 7 host cities)

Final positions
- Champions: England (7th title)
- Runners-up: Mexico
- Third place: Turkey
- Fourth place: Scotland

Tournament statistics
- Matches played: 26
- Goals scored: 68 (2.62 per match)
- Top scorer: (Mexico) Eduardo Aguirre (7 goals)
- Best player: (Mexico) Diego Lainez
- Best goalkeeper: (England) Freddie Woodman

The 2018 Toulon Tournament (officially French: 46ème Festival International "Espoirs" – Tournoi Maurice Revello) was the 46th edition of the Toulon Tournament. It was held in the department of Bouches-du-Rhône from 26 May to 9 June 2018.

England won the tournament for the third successive year beating Mexico 2–1 in the final.

== Participants ==
Twelve participating teams were announced on 27 February 2018.

AFC

- China (12th participation)
- Japan (13th participation)
- Qatar (5th participation)
- South Korea (5th participation)

CAF

- Togo (1st participation)

CONCACAF

- Canada (1st participation)
- Mexico (24th participation)

UEFA

- England^{TH} (20th participation)
- France (41st participation)
- Portugal (29th participation)
- Scotland (9th participation)
- Turkey (5th participation)

== Venues ==
A total of seven cities hosted the tournament.

Aubagne	2018 Toulon Tournament is located in Provence-Alpes-Côte d'Azur		
Stade de Lattre-de-Tassigny	2018 Toulon Tournament is located in Provence-Alpes-Côte d'Azur		
43.2939695°N 5.5623227°E	2018 Toulon Tournament is located in Provence-Alpes-Côte d'Azur		
Capacity: 1,000	2018 Toulon Tournament is located in Provence-Alpes-Côte d'Azur		
Carnoux-en-Provence	2018 Toulon Tournament is located in Provence-Alpes-Côte d'Azur		
Stade Marcel Cerdan	2018 Toulon Tournament is located in Provence-Alpes-Côte d'Azur		
43.250270°N 5.552645°E	2018 Toulon Tournament is located in Provence-Alpes-Côte d'Azur		
Capacity: 1,700	2018 Toulon Tournament is located in Provence-Alpes-Côte d'Azur		
Fos-sur-Mer	2018 Toulon Tournament is located in Provence-Alpes-Côte d'Azur		
Stade Parsemain	2018 Toulon Tournament is located in Provence-Alpes-Côte d'Azur		
43.4687854°N 4.9489821°E	2018 Toulon Tournament is located in Provence-Alpes-Côte d'Azur		
Capacity: 17,170	2018 Toulon Tournament is located in Provence-Alpes-Côte d'Azur		
Mallemort	Martigues	Salon-de-Provence	Vitrolles
Stade d'Honneur	Stade Francis Turcan	Stade d'Honneur Marcel Roustan	Stade Jules-Ladoumègue
43.7241096°N 5.1774767°E	43.407266°N 5.0493964°E	43.6356163°N 5.0928964°E	43.4578485°N 5.2433091°E
Capacity: 720	Capacity: 11,500	Capacity: 4,000	Capacity: 1,500

== Match officials ==
The referees were:

(Canada) Yusri Rudolf

Assistants: Micheal Barwegen and Daniel Belleau

(France) Karim Abed

Assistants: Mehdi Rahmouni and Mikaël Berchebru

(Greece) Ioannis Papadopoulos

Assistants: Ioannis Sipkas and Vasileios Kampouris

(Malta) Trustin Farrugia Cann

Assistants: Alan Camilleri and Christopher Lawrence Francalanza

(Mexico) Marco Antonio Ortiz

Assistants: José Luis Camargo and Marcos Quintero

(Portugal) Luís Miguel Branco Godinho

Assistants: Nuno Pereira and Luís Campos

(Romania) Radu Petrescu

Assistants: Mihai Marius Marica and Radu-Adrian-Ştefan Ghinguleac

(South Korea) Choi Hyun-jai

Assistants: Joo Hyeon-min and Shin Jae-hwan

== Matches rules ==
Every match consisted of two periods of 40 minutes each. In a match, every team had nine named substitutes and the maximum number of substitutions permitted was four.
In the knockout stage, if a game tied at the end of regulation time, extra time would not be played and the penalty shoot-out would be used to determine the winner.

== Group stage ==
The draw was held on 15 March 2018. The twelve teams were drawn into three groups of four. The group winners and the best runners-up qualified for the semi-finals. The Group stage was played from 26 May to 3 June 2018.

=== Group A ===
Pos	Team	Pld	W	D	L	GF	GA	GD	Pts	Qualification
1	Mexico	3	2	1	0	7	2	+5	7	Advance to knockout stage
2	England	3	2	1	0	6	1	+5	7	Advance to knockout stage
3	China	3	0	1	2	3	6	−3	1	
4	Qatar	3	0	1	2	2	9	−7	1	

Source: Toulon Tournament

All times are local CEST

26 May 2018
15:00

England	2–1	China
Fry 52'; Abraham 80'	Report	Yan Dinghao 20'

Stade de Lattre-de-Tassigny, Aubagne
Referee: Radu Petrescu (Romania)
26 May 2018
17:30

Qatar	1–4	Mexico
Murisi 80+1'	Report	Lainez 2'; Aguirre 34', 36'; Alvarado 54'

Stade de Lattre-de-Tassigny, Aubagne
Referee: Trustin Farrugia Cann (Malta)

29 May 2018
17:00

China	1–1	Qatar
Cong Zhen 80+4' (pen.)	Report	Jenahi 15'

Stade d'Honneur Marcel Roustan, Salon-de-Provence
Referee: Choi Hyun-jai (South Korea)
29 May 2018
19:30

Mexico	0–0	England
	Report

Stade d'Honneur Marcel Roustan, Salon-de-Provence
Referee: Karim Abed (France)

1 June 2018
17:00

China	1–3	Mexico
Deng Yubiao 12'	Report	Alvarado 28'; Aguirre 36', 58' (pen.)

Stade Parsemain, Fos-sur-Mer
Referee: Luís Miguel Branco Godinho (Portugal)
1 June 2018
19:30

England	4–0	Qatar
Al-Hamawende 38' (o.g.); Vieira 53'; Abraham 56'; Armstrong 67'	Report

Stade Parsemain, Fos-sur-Mer
Referee: Yusri Rudolf (Canada)

=== Group B ===
Pos	Team	Pld	W	D	L	GF	GA	GD	Pts	Qualification
1	Scotland	3	2	1	0	4	2	+2	7	Advance to knockout stage
2	France (H)	3	2	0	1	6	2	+4	6	
3	Togo	3	1	1	1	3	4	−1	4	
4	South Korea	3	0	0	3	3	8	−5	0	

Source: Toulon Tournament
(H) Hosts

All times are local CEST

27 May 2018
15:00

France	4–1	South Korea
Ambri 4'; Tell 8', 52'; Kanga 50'	Report	Cho Young-wook 43' (pen.)

Stade de Lattre-de-Tassigny, Aubagne
Referee: Luís Miguel Branco Godinho (Portugal)
27 May 2018
17:30

Togo	1–1	Scotland
Wogodo 3'	Report	Hornby 18'

Stade de Lattre-de-Tassigny, Aubagne
Referee: Yusri Rudolf (Canada)

30 May 2018
17:00

South Korea	1–2	Togo
Lee Kang-in 4'	Report	Denkey 17', 33'

Stade d'Honneur Marcel Roustan, Salon-de-Provence
Referee: Ioannis Papadopoulos (Greece)
30 May 2018
19:30

Scotland	1–0	France
Burke 35'	Report

Stade d'Honneur Marcel Roustan, Salon-de-Provence
Referee: Radu Petrescu (Romania)

2 June 2018
15:00

South Korea	1–2	Scotland
Lee Kang-in 71'	Report	Gilmour 2'; Burke 8'

Stade Parsemain, Fos-sur-Mer
Referee: Trustin Farrugia Cann (Malta)
2 June 2018
17:30

France	2–0	Togo
Blas 6'; Lasme 39'	Report

Stade Parsemain, Fos-sur-Mer
Referee: Marco Antonio Ortiz Nava (Mexico)

=== Group C ===
Pos	Team	Pld	W	D	L	GF	GA	GD	Pts	Qualification
1	Turkey	3	2	0	1	4	3	+1	6	Advance to knockout stage
2	Canada	3	1	2	0	2	1	+1	5	
3	Japan	3	1	1	1	5	5	0	4	
4	Portugal	3	0	1	2	3	5	−2	1	

Source: Toulon Tournament

All times are local CEST

28 May 2018
17:00

Turkey	2–1	Japan
Akçay 61', 75'	Report	Miyoshi 44'

Stade Jules-Ladoumègue, Vitrolles
Referee: Marco Antonio Ortiz Nava (Mexico)
28 May 2018
19:30

Portugal	0–0	Canada
	Report

Stade Jules-Ladoumègue, Vitrolles
Referee: Ioannis Papadopoulos (Greece)

31 May 2018
17:00

Japan	3–2	Portugal
Tagawa 36'; Ueda 77', 80+3' (pen.)	Report	Luís Silva 32'; Jota 72'

Stade Jules-Ladoumègue, Vitrolles
Referee: Trustin Farrugia Cann (Malta)
31 May 2018
19:30

Canada	1–0	Turkey
Verhoeven 75'	Report

Stade Jules-Ladoumègue, Vitrolles
Referee: Marco Antonio Ortiz Nava (Mexico)

3 June 2018
15:00

Japan	1–1	Canada
Mitoma 60'	Report	Bair 9'

Stade Parsemain, Fos-sur-Mer
Referee: Karim Abed (France)
3 June 2018
17:30

Portugal	1–2	Turkey
José Gomes 61' (pen.)	Report	Alıcı 3'; Kanatsızkuş 25'

Stade Parsemain, Fos-sur-Mer
Referee: Choi Hyun-jai (South Korea)

== Classification matches ==
The teams that failed to reach the knock-out stage played an additional game to determine their final ranking in the competition.

All times were local CEST

=== Eleventh place playoff ===
5 June 2018
16:00

Qatar	1–2	South Korea
Al Ahrak 64'	Report	Jeon Se-jin 13' (pen.); Cho Young-wook 50'

Stade d'Honneur, Mallemort
Referee: Luís Miguel Branco Godinho (Portugal)

=== Ninth place playoff ===
5 June 2018
16:00

Portugal	2–0	China
Domingos Quina 11'; Pedro Martelo 27'	Report

Stade Marcel Cerdan, Carnoux-en-Provence
Referee: Yusri Rudolf (Canada)

=== Seventh place playoff ===
7 June 2018
16:00

Japan	1–0	Togo
Miyoshi 39'	Report

Stade Marcel Cerdan, Carnoux-en-Provence
Referee: Trustin Farrugia Cann (Malta)

=== Fifth place playoff ===
7 June 2018
16:00

France	2–1	Canada
Bakayoko 24'; Ambri 72'	Report	Choinière 75'

Stade d'Honneur, Mallemort
Referee: Choi Hyun-jai (South Korea)

== Knockout stage ==
Semi-finals
6 June – Aubagne
Mexico	3
Turkey	1
6 June – Aubagne
Scotland	1
England	3

Final
9 June – Martigues
Mexico	1
England	2
Third place
9 June – Martigues
Turkey (p)	0 (5)
Scotland	0 (3)

All times are local CEST

=== Semi-finals ===
6 June 2018
17:00

Mexico	3–1	Turkey
Aguirre 26', 57', 76' (pen.)	Report	Kanatsızkuş 78' (pen.)

Stade de Lattre-de-Tassigny, Aubagne
Referee: Radu Petrescu (Romania)

6 June 2018
19:30

Scotland	1–3	England
Johnston 30'	Report	Connolly 45'; Nketiah 50', 69'

Stade de Lattre-de-Tassigny, Aubagne
Referee: Marco Antonio Ortiz Nava (Mexico)

=== Third place playoff ===
9 June 2018
16:00

Turkey	0–0	Scotland
	Report
Penalties
Akçay (penalty scored); S. Polat (penalty scored); Alıcı (penalty scored); Demiral (penalty scored); Kanatsızkuş (penalty scored)	5–3	(penalty scored) Johnston; (penalty scored) Gilmour; (penalty missed) Burke; (penalty scored) Hornby

Stade Francis Turcan, Martigues
Referee: Yusri Rudolf (Canada)

=== Final ===
9 June 2018
18:30

Mexico	1–2	England
Alvarado 2'	Report	Fry 32'; Dowell 36'

Stade Francis Turcan, Martigues
Referee: Ioannis Papadopoulos (Greece)

== Goalscorers ==
68 goals were scored in 26 matches, for an average of 2.62 goals per match.

7 goals

- (Mexico) Eduardo Aguirre

3 goals

- (Mexico) Roberto Alvarado

2 goals

- (England) Tammy Abraham
- (England) Dael Fry
- (England) Eddie Nketiah
- (France) Steve Ambri
- (France) Jordan Tell
- (Japan) Koji Miyoshi
- (Japan) Ayase Ueda
- (Scotland) Oliver Burke
- (South Korea) Cho Young-wook
- (South Korea) Lee Kang-in
- (Togo) Kévin Denkey
- (Turkey) Mücahit Can Akçay
- (Turkey) Kubilay Kanatsızkuş

1 goal

- (Canada) Theo Bair
- (Canada) Mathieu Choinière
- (Canada) Noah Verhoeven
- (China) Cong Zhen
- (China) Deng Yubiao
- (China) Yan Dinghao
- (England) Adam Armstrong
- (England) Callum Connolly
- (England) Kieran Dowell
- (England) Ronaldo Vieira
- (France) Axel Bakayoko
- (France) Ludovic Blas
- (France) Wilfried Kanga
- (France) Bryan Lasme
- (Japan) Kaoru Mitoma
- (Japan) Kyosuke Tagawa
- (Mexico) Diego Lainez
- (Portugal) Domingos Quina
- (Portugal) José Gomes
- (Portugal) Jota
- (Portugal) Luís Silva
- (Portugal) Pedro Martelo
- (Qatar) Nasser Al Ahrak
- (Qatar) Ahmed Jenahi
- (Qatar) Abdullah Murisi
- (Scotland) Billy Gilmour
- (Scotland) Fraser Hornby
- (Scotland) Mikey Johnston
- (South Korea) Jeon Se-jin
- (Togo) Thomas Wogodo
- (Turkey) Barış Alıcı

Own goal

- (Qatar) Ahmed Al-Hamawende (playing against England)

== Awards ==
=== Individual awards ===
After the final, the following players were rewarded for their performances during the competition.

- Best player: (Mexico) Diego Lainez
- Second best player: (England) Lewis Cook
- Third best player: (Scotland) Mikey Johnston
- Fourth best player: (South Korea) Lee Kang-in
- Breakthrough player: (Scotland) Billy Gilmour
- Best goalkeeper: (England) Freddie Woodman
- Topscorer: (Mexico) Eduardo Aguirre
- Younger player of the final: (Mexico) Diego Lainez
- Best goal of the tournament: (England) Eddie Nketiah (playing against Scotland (50'))
- Fair-Play: Scotland

=== Best XI ===
The best XI team was a squad consisting of the eleven most impressive players at the tournament.

Pos.	Player
GK	(England) Freddie Woodman
DF	(Mexico) Jorge Sánchez
DF	(Mexico) César Montes
DF	(England) Dael Fry
DF	(France) Romain Perraud
MF	(Scotland) Billy Gilmour
MF	(England) Lewis Cook
MF	(South Korea) Lee Kang-in
FW	(Mexico) Diego Lainez
FW	(Mexico) Eduardo Aguirre
FW	(Scotland) Mikey Johnston

== See also ==
- 2018 Sud Ladies Cup
