= Bernardo Sousa =

Bernardo Sousa may refer to:

- Bernardo Sousa (rally driver) (born 1987), Portuguese rally driver
- Bernardo Sousa (footballer) (born 2000), Portuguese footballer
