= Shanab =

Shanab is a surname. In the Bedawi dialect of Sudanese Arabic the word means moustache.

People with the surname include:

- Abdel Fattah Abou-Shanab (born 1935), Egyptian rower
- Ismail Abu Shanab (1950–2003), Palestinian engineer and assassinated Hamas politician
- Mohammad Abu Shanab (born 1998), Qatari footballer
- Nora Shanab (born 1987), Israeli Arab footballer
