= Charlie Jazz Festival =

Annual music festival in Provence, France

Coordinates: 43°25′14″N 5°16′52″E

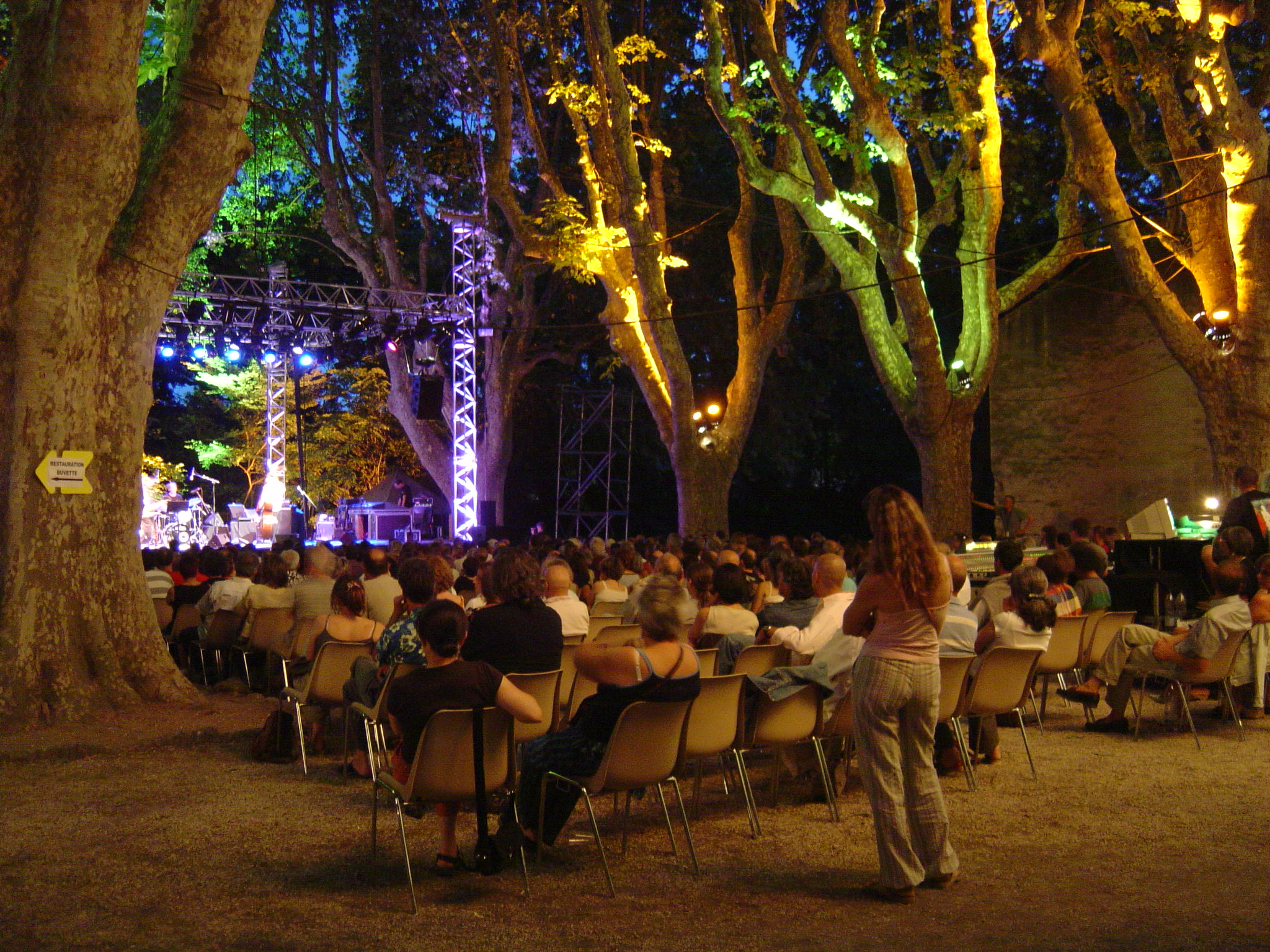
The main stage under plane trees

The Charlie Jazz Festival is an annual music festival held every summer in Vitrolles, Provence, France. It was established in 1998 by Charlie Free, a not-for-profit jazz organization which runs jazz sessions every two weeks at Le Moulin à Jazz, a famous jazz club in France.

The festival is hosted at Le Domaine de Fontblanche, a public garden with hundred-year-old plane trees, the first weekend of July.

The two stages in the park feature concerts by international artists, but a large part of the program aims to discover talented young players from Europe and France.

Since its beginning, the festival has hosted world-renowned artists and groups such as Didier Levallet, Daniel Humair, Chris Potter, Christian Escoudé, Aldo Romano, Paolo Fresu, Bojan Z, Archie Shepp, Elisabeth Kontomanou, Raphaël Imbert, David Linx, Diederik Wissels, Michel Portal, Louis Sclavis, The Art Ensemble of Chicago, Richard Galliano, The Vienna Art Orchestra, Carla Bley, Henri Texier, and dozens of other top names in jazz music.
