= Lucas Alarcón =

Chilean footballer (born 2000)

Personal information
- Full name: Lucas Bastián Alarcón Ancapi
- Date of birth: 5 March 2000 (age 26)
- Place of birth: Puente Alto, Santiago, Chile
- Height: 1.83 m (6 ft 0 in)
- Position: Defender

Team information
- Current team: Deportes La Serena
- Number: 5

Youth career
- Universidad de Chile

Senior career*
Years	Team	Apps	(Gls)
2019–2021	Universidad de Chile	4	(0)
2020–2021	→ Deportes Valdivia (loan)	21	(1)
2021	→ Deportes La Serena (loan)	11	(0)
2022–	Deportes La Serena	43	(2)

International career^{‡}
2015	Chile U15		
2017	Chile U17	17	(1)
2019	Chile U20	4	(1)
2019	Chile U23	4	(0)
- * Club domestic league appearances and goals as of 2 October 2024 ‡ National team caps and goals as of 13 June 2019

Lucas Bastián Alarcón Ancapi (born 5 March 2000) is a Chilean footballer who plays as a defender for Deportes La Serena.

== Club career ==
A product of Universidad de Chile, Alarcón was loaned to Deportes Valdivia and Deportes La Serena in 2020 and 2021, respectively. In 2022, he renewed with Deportes La Serena, winning the 2024 Primera B de Chile.

== International career ==
At early age, he represented Chile at under-15 level at the 2015 South American U-15 Championship and Chile U17 at two friendly matches against USA U17, at the 2017 South American U-17 Championship – Chile was the runner-up – and at the 2017 FIFA U-17 World Cup. Also, he played all the matches for Chile U17 at the friendly tournament Lafarge Foot Avenir 2017 in France, better known as Tournament Limoges, where Chile became champion after defeating Belgium U18 and Poland U18 and drawing France U18.

On 2019, he represented Chile U20 at the 2019 South American U-20 Championship and played four matches for Chile U23 at the 2019 Maurice Revello Tournament.

== Career statistics ==
=== Club ===
As of 17 January 2021.

Club	Season	League			Cup		Continental		Other		Total	
Club	Season	Division	Apps	Goals	Apps	Goals	Apps	Goals	Apps	Goals	Apps	Goals
Universidad de Chile	2019	Primera División	4	0	0	0	0	0	0	0	4	0
Deportes Valdivia (loan)	2020	Primera B	21	1	0	0	—		0	0	21	1
Total career			25	1	0	0	0	0	0	0	25	1

== Honours ==
Deportes La Serena

- Primera B de Chile: 2024

Chile U17

- Tournoi de Limoges: 2017
