= Barış Alıcı =

Turkish footballer

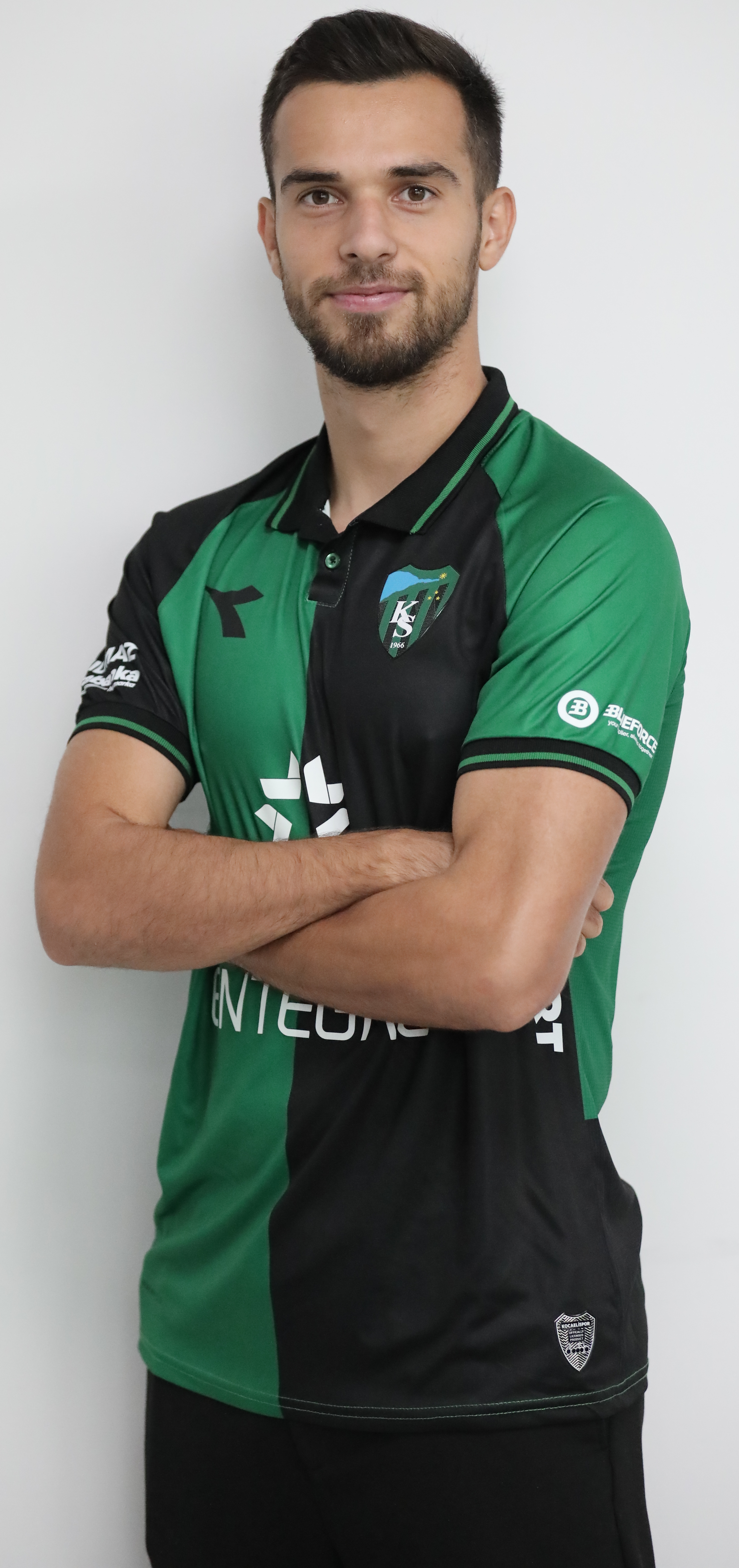

Personal information
- Date of birth: 24 June 1997 (age 29)
- Place of birth: Bornova, Turkey
- Height: 1.80 m (5 ft 11 in)
- Position: Winger

Team information
- Current team: Sarıyer

Youth career
- 2007–2009: Bergama Gençlerbirliğispor
- 2009–2013: Bucaspor
- 2013–2015: Altınordu

Senior career*
Years	Team	Apps	(Gls)
2015–2018	Altınordu	53	(13)
2018–2021	Fenerbahçe	8	(0)
2019	→ Yeni Malatyaspor (loan)	6	(0)
2019–2020	→ Çaykur Rizespor (loan)	7	(0)
2020–2021	→ Westerlo (loan)	19	(1)
2021–2023	Gençlerbirliği	55	(12)
2023–2024	Samsunspor	4	(0)
2023–2024	→ Kocaelispor (loan)	31	(6)
2024–2025	Kocaelispor	28	(2)
2025–2026	Boluspor	29	(5)
2026–	Sarıyer	0	(0)

International career^{‡}
2017–2018	Turkey U20	5	(1)
2017–2018	Turkey U21	5	(0)
- * Club domestic league appearances and goals as of 6 May 2026 ‡ National team caps and goals as of 16 January 2021

Barış Alıcı (born 24 June 1997) is a Turkish professional footballer who plays as a winger for TFF 1. Lig club Sarıyer.

== Club career ==
On 11 June 2018, Alıcı transferred to Fenerbahçe from Altınordu. He made his professional debut for Fenerbahçe in a 1–0 Champions League qualifier against S.L. Benfica on 7 August 2018.

On 13 January 2019, he joined Yeni Malatyaspor on loan for the rest of the season.

On 28 January 2020, he moved to Westerlo on a 1.5-year loan deal.

== International career ==
Alıcı represented the Turkey U20 at the 2018 Toulon Tournament.

== Personal life ==
Alıcı is the twin brother of the footballer Kerim Alıcı.

== Career statistics ==
=== Club ===
As of 28 January 2020

Appearances and goals by club, season and competition
Club	Season	League		Cup		Europe		Total	
Club	Season	Apps	Goals	Apps	Goals	Apps	Goals	Apps	Goals
Altınordu	2014–15	0	0	2	0	–		2	0
Altınordu	2015–16	2	0	0	0	–		2	0
Altınordu	2016–17	19	3	1	0	–		20	3
Altınordu	2017–18	32	10	1	0	–		33	10
Altınordu	Total	53	13	4	0	–		57	13
Fenerbahçe	2018–19	8	0	2	0	5	0	15	0
Yeni Malatyaspor (loan)	2018–19	6	0	4	2	–		10	2
Çaykur Rizespor (loan)	2019–20	7	0	2	2	–		9	2
Westerlo (loan)	2019–20	1	0	0	0	–		0	0
Career total		75	13	12	4	5	0	91	17
