= Zacarías López =

Chilean footballer (born 1998)

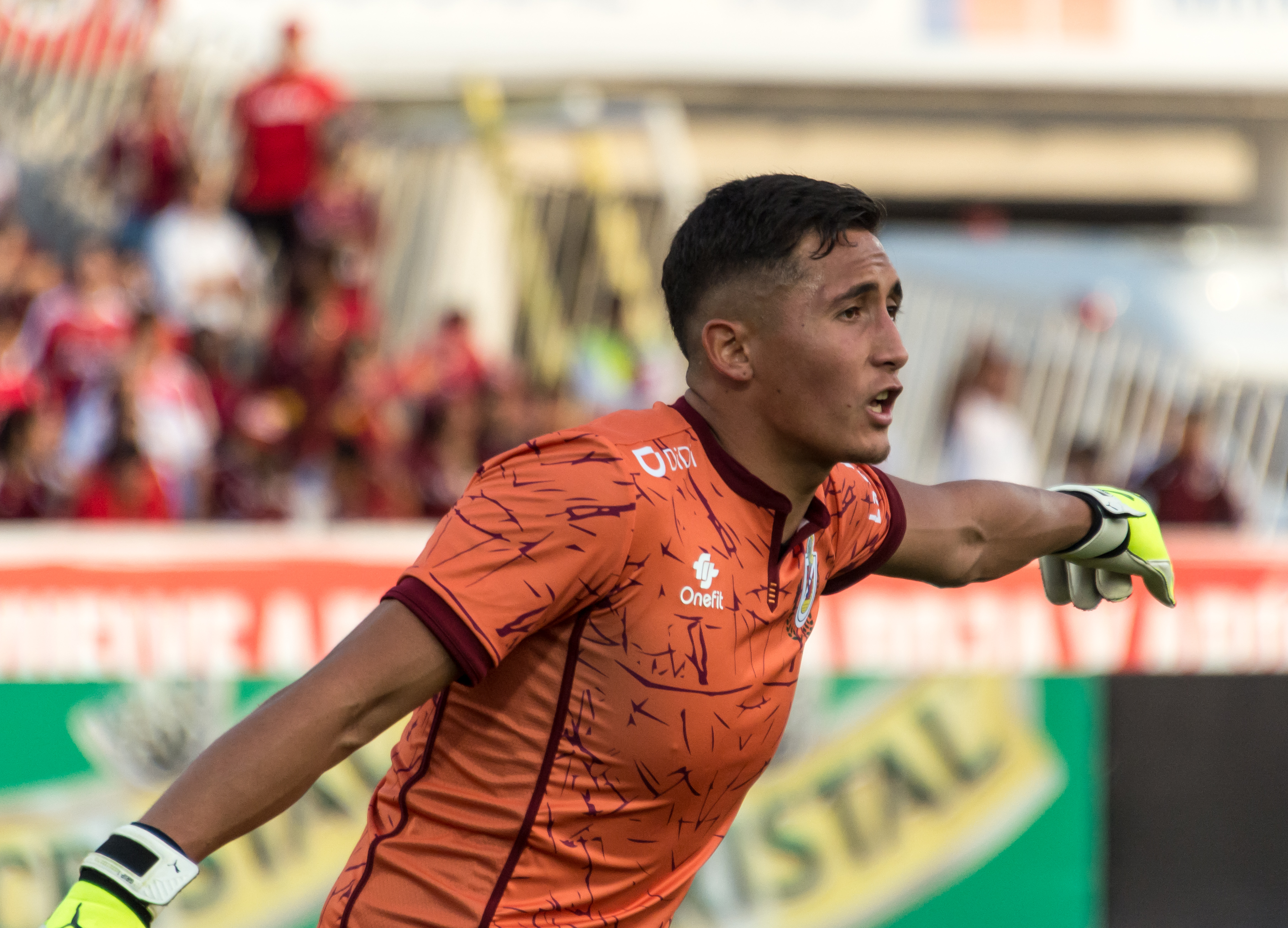
- López with Deportes La Serena in 2020

Personal information
- Full name: Zacarías Orlando López González
- Date of birth: 30 June 1998 (age 28)
- Place of birth: Arica, Chile
- Height: 1.84 m (6 ft 0 in)
- Position: Goalkeeper

Team information
- Current team: Deportes Iquique (on loan from Huachipato)

Youth career
- San Marcos

Senior career*
Years	Team	Apps	(Gls)
2013–2018	San Marcos	28	(0)
2018	Deportivo Municipal	0	(0)
2018	→ Deportes La Serena (loan)	21	(0)
2019–2023	Deportes La Serena	130	(0)
2024–	Huachipato	5	(0)
2024	→ Deportes Antofagasta (loan)	15	(0)
2026–	→ Deportes Iquique (loan)	0	(0)

International career^{‡}
2014–2015	Chile U17	11	(0)
2017	Chile U20	0	(0)
2019	Chile U22	1	(0)
2021–	Chile	1	(0)
- * Club domestic league appearances and goals as of 5 February 2026 ‡ National team caps and goals as of 29 January 2022

Zacarías Orlando López González (born 30 June 1998) is a Chilean footballer who plays as a goalkeeper for Deportes Iquique on loan from Huachipato.

== Club career ==
After playing for six seasons for Deportes La Serena, López signed with Huachipato, then the Chilean champions, for the 2024 season. In July of the same year, he moved on loan to Deportes Antofagasta. In February 2026, he joined Deportes Iquique.

== International career ==
López made his debut for Chile national team on 11 December 2021 in a 1–0 win over El Salvador.

== Personal life ==
He is the younger brother of the footballer Juan López.

== Career statistics ==
=== Club ===
As of 10 September 2020

Appearances and goals by club, season and competition
Club	Season	League			Cup		Continental		Other		Total	
Club	Season	Division	Apps	Goals	Apps	Goals	Apps	Goals	Apps	Goals	Apps	Goals
San Marcos	2013	Primera B de Chile	0	0	0	0	–		0	0	0	0
San Marcos	2014	Primera B de Chile	0	0	0	0	–		0	0	0	0
San Marcos	2014–15	Chilean Primera División	0	0	2 (Note: Appearances in the Copa Chile)	0	–		0	0	2	0
San Marcos	2015–16	Chilean Primera División	3	0	0	0	–		0	0	3	0
San Marcos	2016–17	Primera B de Chile	11	0	2	0	–		0	0	13	0
San Marcos	2017	Primera B de Chile	14	0	3	0	–		0	0	3	0
San Marcos	Total		28	0	7	0	0	0	0	0	35	0
La Serena	2018	Primera B de Chile	21	0	2	0	–		0	0	23	0
La Serena	2019	Primera B de Chile	12	0	2	0	–		0	0	14	0
La Serena	2020	Chilean Primera División	7	0	0	0	–		0	0	7	0
La Serena	Total		40	0	4	0	0	0	0	0	44	0
Career total			68	0	11	0	0	0	0	0	79	0

== Honours ==
Huachipato

- Copa Chile: 2025
