= Mücahit Can Akçay =

Turkish footballer (born 1998)

Personal information
- Full name: Mücahit Can Akçay
- Date of birth: 13 April 1998 (age 28)
- Place of birth: Bağcılar, Turkey
- Height: 1.80 m (5 ft 11 in)
- Position: Forward

Team information
- Current team: 52 Orduspor
- Number: 9

Youth career
- 2010–2016: Gençlerbirliği

Senior career*
Years	Team	Apps	(Gls)
2016–2020	Konyaspor	15	(0)
2017–2018	→ Anadolu Selçukspor (loan)	31	(17)
2020	→ Ümraniyespor (loan)	16	(1)
2020–2021	Ankaragücü	2	(0)
2021	→ 1461 Trabzon (loan)	11	(3)
2021–2024	Ankara Demirspor	56	(18)
2024	Iğdır	16	(10)
2024–2025	Bursaspor	26	(9)
2025–2026	Mardin 1969	25	(15)
2026–	52 Orduspor	4	(2)

International career^{‡}
2012–2013	Turkey U15	4	(1)
2014	Turkey U16	4	(0)
2014	Turkey U17	2	(0)
2018	Turkey U20	5	(2)
- * Club domestic league appearances and goals as of 1 October 2026 ‡ National team caps and goals as of 28 October 2018

Mücahit Can Akçay (born 13 April 1998) is a Turkish professional footballer who plays as a forward for TFF 2. Lig club 52 Orduspor.

== Professional career ==
A youth product of Gençlerbirliği, Akçay signed with Konyaspor in 2016 and made his debut for them in a 1-0 Turkish Cup loss to Trabzonspor on 26 January 2017. Akçay was loaned to Anadolu Selçukspor for the 2017–18 season in the TFF Second League, and finished as one of the top scorers in the league.

== International career ==
Akçay is a youth international for Turkey. He represented the Turkey U20s at the 2018 Toulon Tournament, and scored a brace in his debut - a 2–1 win over the Japan U20s on 28 May 2018.

== Honours ==
=== Club ===
Konyaspor

- Turkish Cup (1): 2016-17
