= Hôtel de Ville, Vitrolles =

Town hall in Vitrolles, France

Hôtel de Ville
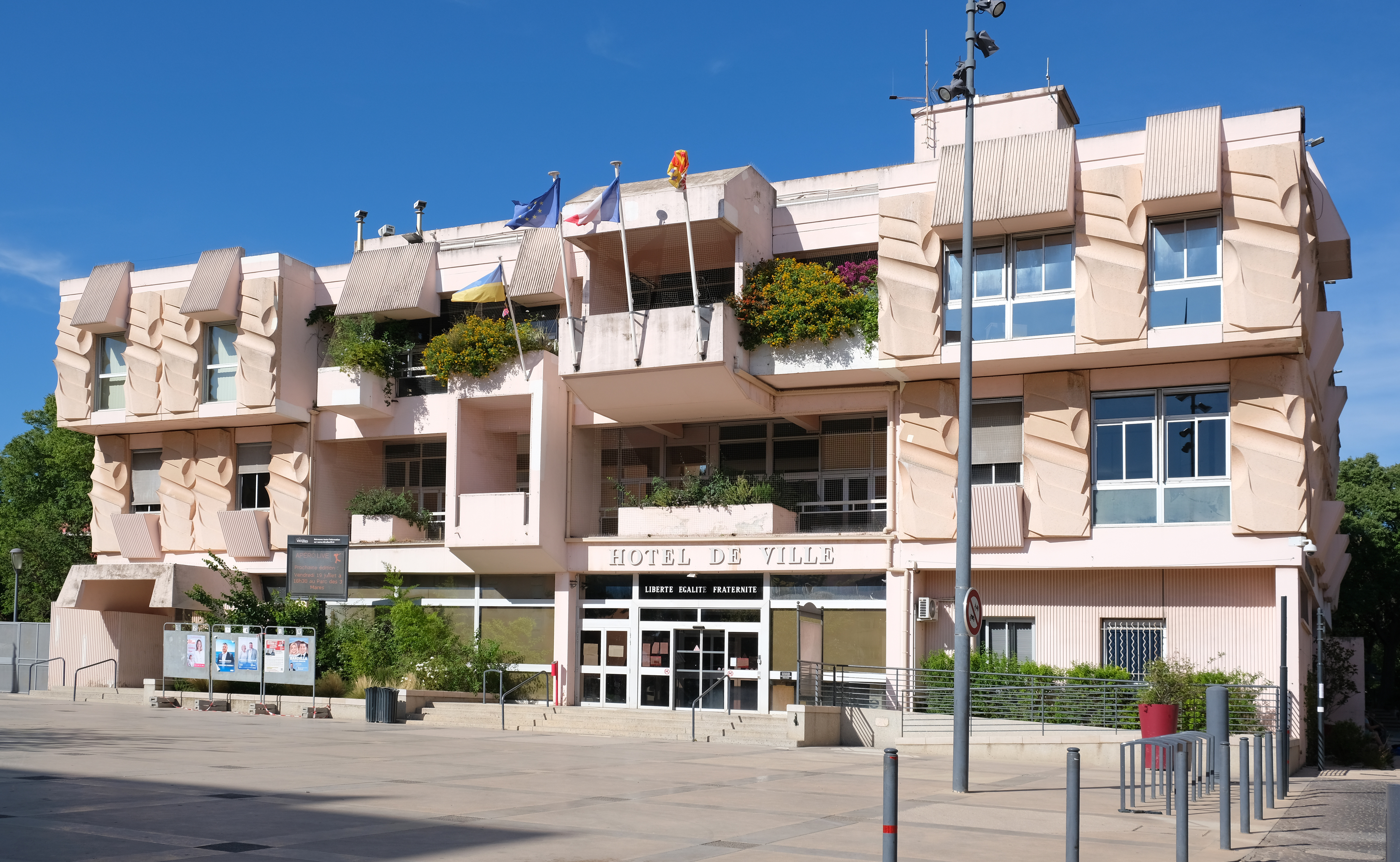
- The main frontage of the Hôtel de Ville in July 2024
- Interactive map of the Hôtel de Ville area

General information
- Type: City hall
- Architectural style: Modern style
- Location: Vitrolles, France
- Coordinates: 43.4479°N 5.2498°E
- Completed: 1977

The Hôtel de Ville (French pronunciation: [otɛl də vil], City Hall) is a municipal building in Vitrolles, Bouches-du-Rhône, in southern France, standing on Place de Provence.

== History ==
The first municipal building in the town was a combined town hall and school, known as the Maison Commune, on the first floor of the Porte Notre-Dame, which dated back to 1668. In the early 1880s, the town council led by the mayor, François Hilaire Touche, decided to commission a more substantial combined town hall and school. The site they selected was on Avenue Camille Pelletan. The new building was designed in the neoclassical style, built in brick with a cement render finish and was completed in 1883. The design involved a symmetrical main frontage of three bays facing onto Avenue Camille Pelletan. The central bay featured a doorway with a stone surround and a cornice. The outer bays on the ground floor and all three bays on the first floor were fenestrated with casement windows.

During the liberation of the town by American troops on 23 August 1944, during the Second World War, the departing German troops surrendered their food reserves at the town hall for use by the local people. The building ceased to be used for educational purposes after the École Victor Martin opened in 1953.

In the early 1970s, following significant population growth, the council led by the mayor, Henri Brémond, decided to commission a modern town hall. The new building was designed in the modern style, built in concrete and glass and was completed in 1977. The design involved an asymmetrical main frontage of eight bays facing onto Place de Provence. The sixth and seventh bays from the left featured a glass doorway on the ground floor, a concrete box on the first floor and a balcony with a concrete canopy on the left side of the second floor. The fourth and fifth bays also contained concrete boxes of irregular shapes and sizes on the first floor, while the other bays were fenestrated by casement windows flanked by moulded concrete panels. Internally, the principal rooms were the Salle des Mariages (wedding room) and the Salle du Conseil (council chamber).

A war memorial, designed by Stanislas Clastrier in the form of a stone stele, was relocated from its original location at the Val d'Ambla cemetery to the forecourt of the town hall in May 2011. A plaque was added to the memorial to commemorate the lives of seven American airmen who had died when their Douglas C-47 Skytrain crashed on the Vitrolles Plateau during the Second World War.

The wedding room was refurbished to a design by the architectural firms, Issima and SO2, in 2014.
