= Ignacio Jara =

Chilean professional footballer (born 1997)

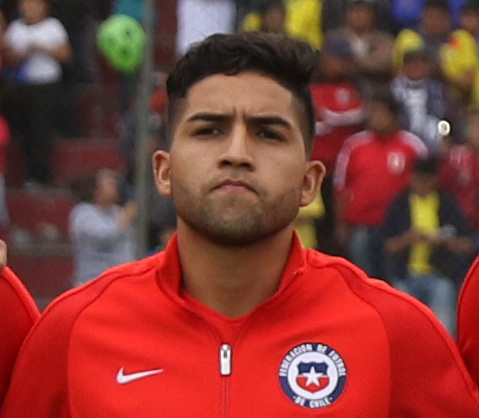
- Jara with Chile U20 in 2017

Personal information
- Full name: Ignacio Andrés Jara Vargas
- Date of birth: 28 January 1997 (age 29)
- Place of birth: Quinta Normal, Santiago, Chile
- Height: 1.68 m (5 ft 6 in)
- Position: Midfielder

Team information
- Current team: Unión San Felipe

Youth career
- 2006–2016: Cobreloa

Senior career*
Years	Team	Apps	(Gls)
2016–2020	Cobreloa	66	(17)
2020	→ Goiás (loan)	8	(1)
2020–2025	Colo-Colo	22	(3)
2022	→ Unión Española (loan)	14	(1)
2023	→ Cobreloa (loan)	26	(2)
2024	→ Coquimbo Unido (loan)	7	(0)
2025	Deportes Antofagasta	14	(1)
2026–	Unión San Felipe	0	(0)

International career
2016	Chile U20	4	(1)
2019–2020	Chile U23	5	(1)
- * Club domestic league appearances and goals as of 12 February 2026

Ignacio Andrés Jara Vargas (Spanish pronunciation: [iɣˈnaθjo ˈxaɾa]; born 28 January 1997) is a Chilean professional footballer who plays as a midfielder for Unión San Felipe.

== Club career ==
He was trained as professional footballer in Cobreloa youth system in Santiago de Chile since 2006.

His first call up to the U-20 Chile team was in May 2016, and scored his first goal against Everton de Viña del Mar in a friendly match also.

He was called up by coach Juan Antonio Pizzi to the absolute national Chile team on 27 May 2016 against the national team of Jamaica, he was an alternate player during all the match and the México match also on 1 June 2016, his second absolute national football match. He was invited to collaborate as sparring of the absolute national team during Copa America Centenario competition.

He made his professional debut in Cobreloa versus Ñublense match, valid for sixth game week of Primera B de Chile, on 10 September 2016. He was enter in 83' replacing Josepablo Monreal.

His first professional goal was in Cobreloa versus Deportes La Serena match, valid for Copa Chile 2016 competition, on 15 September 2016. In 90'.

On 13 February 2020 Jara signed with Campeonato Brasileiro Série A club Goiás

In the second half of 2024, Jara moved to Coquimbo Unido from Colo-Colo.

He ended his contract with Colo-Colo in February 2025 and joined Deportes Antofagasta.

In February 2026, Jara joined Unión San Felipe.

== International career ==
Jara represented Chile U20 in the 2017 South American Championship. At under-23 level, Jara represented Chile in both the 2019 Toulon Tournament and the 2020 Pre-Olympic Tournament.

At senior level, he was a substitute in the friendly matches against Jamaica and Mexico in 2016.
