= Elias Ahmed =

Qatari footballer (born 1997)

Personal information
- Full name: Elias Ahmed Ali
- Date of birth: 12 December 1997 (age 28)
- Position: Left back

Senior career*
Years	Team	Apps	(Gls)
2017–2023	Al-Gharafa	20	(1)
2020	→ Al-Wakrah (loan)	0	(0)

International career^{‡}
2019–	Qatar U22	1	(0)
2018	Qatar U23	1	(0)
- * Club domestic league appearances and goals as of 11:26, 4 June 2019 (UTC) ‡ National team caps and goals as of 11:26, 4 June 2019 (UTC)

Elias Ahmed Ali (born 12 December 1997) is a Qatari professional footballer who plays as a left back.

== Career statistics ==
=== Club ===
As of 4 June 2019.

Club	Season	League			Cup		Continental		Other		Total	
Club	Season	Division	Apps	Goals	Apps	Goals	Apps	Goals	Apps	Goals	Apps	Goals
Al-Gharafa	2017–18	Qatar Stars League	9	1	4 (Note: Appearances in the Qatar Cup)	0	3 (Note: Appearances in the AFC Champions League)	0	0	0	16	1
Al-Gharafa	2018–19	Qatar Stars League	9	0	3	0	1	0	0	0	13	0
Career total			18	1	7	0	4	0	0	0	29	1
