= Salmin Atiq =

Qatari professional footballer (born 1997)

Personal information
- Full name: Salmin Atiq Al Rumaihi
- Date of birth: 11 January 1997 (age 29)
- Position: Midfielder

Youth career
- –2017: El Jaish

Senior career*
Years	Team	Apps	(Gls)
2017–2021	Al-Duhail	0	(0)
2019–2020	→ Umm Salal (loan)	6	(0)
2021–2022	Qatar	19	(0)
2022–2025	Al-Shamal	31	(0)
2024–2025	→ Al-Khor (loan)	6	(0)
- * Club domestic league appearances and goals as of 11:26, 1 June 2019 (UTC)

Salmin Atiq Al Rumaihi (born 11 January 1997), is a Qatari professional footballer who plays as a midfielder.

== Career statistics ==
=== Club ===
As of 1 June 2019.

Club	Season	League			Cup		Continental		Other		Total	
Club	Season	Division	Apps	Goals	Apps	Goals	Apps	Goals	Apps	Goals	Apps	Goals
Al-Duhail	2017–18	Qatar Stars League	0	0	1 (Note: Appearances in the Qatar Cup)	0	0	0	0	0	1	0
Al-Duhail	2018–19	Qatar Stars League	0	0	4	1	1 (Note: Appearances in the AFC Champions League)	0	0	0	5	1
Career total			0	0	5	1	1	0	0	0	6	1
