= Khalid Muneer =

Qatari footballer (born 1998)

Personal information
- Full name: Khalid Muneer Ali Abu Bakr Mazeed
- Date of birth: 24 February 1998 (age 28)
- Place of birth: Doha, Qatar
- Height: 1.74 m (5 ft 9 in)
- Position: Midfielder

Team information
- Current team: Al-Wakrah
- Number: 21

Youth career
- –2014: Aspire Academy
- 2014–2017: Lekhwiya

Senior career*
Years	Team	Apps	(Gls)
2017	Atlético Astorga	4	(0)
2017–2018	Júpiter Leonés	10	(1)
2018–2021	Al-Duhail	0	(0)
2019–2021	→ AL-Wakrah (loan)	28	(6)
2021–	Al-Wakrah	63	(6)
2025	→ Umm Salal (loan)	2	(0)

International career^{‡}
2016	Qatar U19	3	(0)
2018	Qatar U23	6	(1)
2017–2022	Qatar	10	(1)
- * Club domestic league appearances and goals as of 17 January 2026 ‡ National team caps and goals as of 14 February 2025 (UTC)

Khalid Muneer Ali Abu Bakr Mazeed (Arabic: خَالِد مُنِير عَلِيّ أَبُو بَكْر مَزِيد; born 24 February 1998) is a Qatari professional footballer who plays as a midfielder for Qatar Stars League side Al-Wakrah and the Qatar national football team.

== Career statistics ==
=== International ===
As of 6 October 2022

Qatar
Year	Apps	Goals
2016	3	0
2017	0	0
2018	2	0
2019	2	1
2020	2	0
2021	1	0
2022	2	1
Total	12	2

=== International goals ===
Scores and results list Qatar's goal tally first.

No.	Date	Venue	Opponent	Score	Result	Competition
1.	11 June 2019	Stade D'Honneur, Mallemort, France	Bahrain	1–0	1–1	2019 Toulon Tournament

== Honours ==
=== Club ===
Al-Duhail

- Emir of Qatar Cup: 2019

=== International ===
Qatar

- AFC Asian Cup: 2023
