= Víctor Retamal =

Chilean footballer (born 1998)

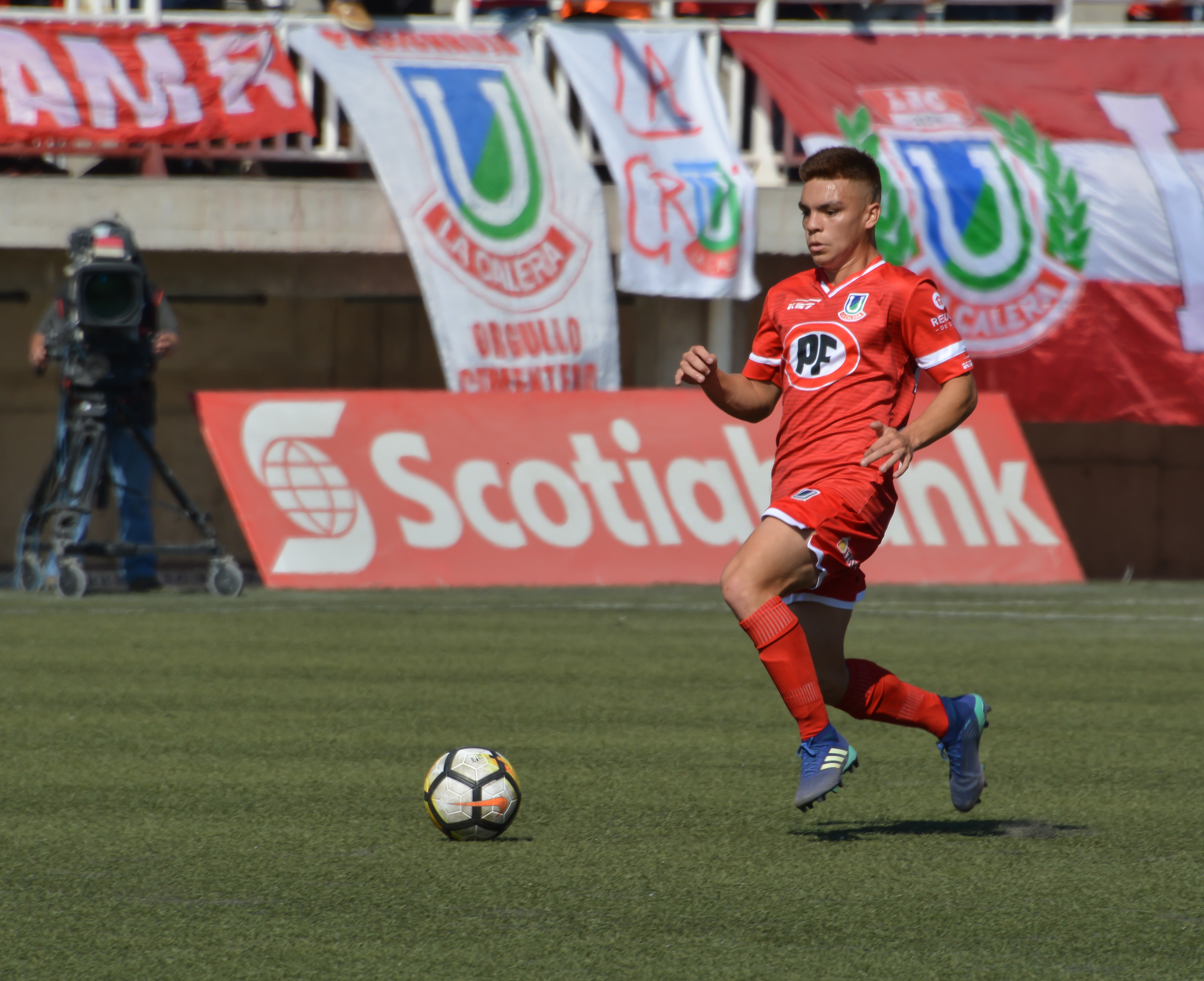
- Retamal with Unión La Calera in 2018

Personal information
- Full name: Víctor Armando Retamal Ahumada
- Date of birth: 6 March 1998 (age 28)
- Place of birth: Limache, Chile
- Height: 1.69 m (5 ft 7 in)
- Position: Defender

Team information
- Current team: Deutscher

Senior career*
Years	Team	Apps	(Gls)
2018–2023	Santiago Wanderers	65	(0)
2018	→ Unión La Calera (loan)	23	(1)
2019	→ Universidad de Concepción (loan)	9	(0)
2024–2025	Deportes Recoleta	24	(0)
2026–	Deutscher	–	(–)

International career^{‡}
2019	Chile U22	2	(0)
- * Club domestic league appearances and goals as of 2 February 2026 ‡ National team caps and goals as of 16:16, 1 June 2019 (UTC)

Víctor Armando Retamal Ahumada (born 6 March 1998) is a Chilean footballer who plays as a defender for Uruguayan club Deutscher.

== Career ==
In 2024, Retamal signed with Deportes Recoleta.

A free agent for about nine months, Retamal joined Uruguayan club Deutscher in the thrid level in September 2026 until the end of the season.

== Career statistics ==
=== Club ===
As of 1 June 2019.

Club	Season	League			Cup		Continental		Other		Total	
Club	Season	Division	Apps	Goals	Apps	Goals	Apps	Goals	Apps	Goals	Apps	Goals
Santiago Wanderers	2018	Chilean Primera División	0	0	0	0	0	0	0	0	0	0
Santiago Wanderers	2019	Chilean Primera División	0	0	0	0	0	0	0	0	0	0
Santiago Wanderers	Total		0	0	0	0	0	0	0	0	0	0
Unión La Calera (loan)	2018	Chilean Primera División	23	1	0	0	0	0	0	0	23	1
Universidad de Concepción	2019	Chilean Primera División	7	0	0	0	2 (Note: Appearances in the Copa Libertadores)	0	0	0	9	0
Career total			30	1	0	0	2	0	0	0	32	1
