= Ibrahim Masoud =

Qatari footballer (born 1997)

Personal information
- Full name: Ibrahim Abdelhalim Masoud
- Date of birth: 25 November 1997 (age 28)
- Place of birth: Qatar
- Position: Winger

Team information
- Current team: Qatar SC
- Number: 12

Youth career
- Al-Rayyan

Senior career*
Years	Team	Apps	(Gls)
2016–2023	Al-Rayyan	50	(0)
2023–2025	Al-Markhiya		
2025–	Qatar SC	0	(0)
- * Club domestic league appearances and goals

Ibrahim Abdelhalim Masoud (Arabic:إبراهيم عبدالحليم مسعود; born 25 November 1997) is a Qatari footballer who currently plays for Qatar SC as a winger.
