= Chen Wei (footballer, born 1998) =

Chinese football player (born 1998)

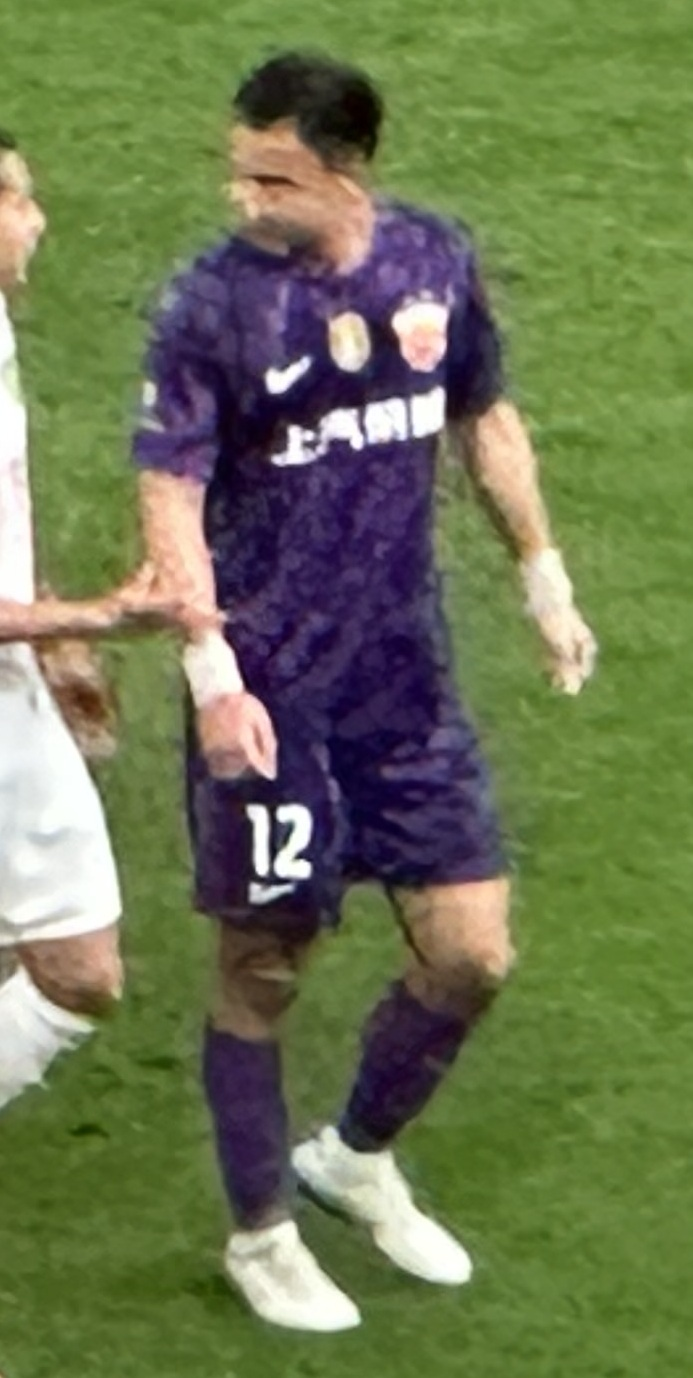
- Chen Wei in May 2025

Personal information
- Full name: Chen Wei
- Date of birth: 14 February 1998 (age 28)
- Place of birth: Jingdezhen, Jiangxi, China
- Height: 1.88 m (6 ft 2 in)
- Position: Goalkeeper

Team information
- Current team: Shanghai Port
- Number: 12

Youth career
- 2009–2016: Shanghai SIPG

Senior career*
Years	Team	Apps	(Gls)
2017–	Shanghai Port	17	(0)

International career^{‡}
2017–2020	China U23	11	(0)
- * Club domestic league appearances and goals as of 25 August 2025 ‡ National team caps and goals as of 15 November 2018

Chen Wei (simplified Chinese: 陈威; traditional Chinese: 陳威; pinyin: Chén Wēi; born 14 February 1998) is a Chinese football player who plays as goalkeeper for Nantong Zhiyun in Chinese Super League.

== Club career ==
Chen Wei was promoted to Chinese Super League side Shanghai SIPG's (later renamed as Shanghai Port) first team squad by André Villas-Boas in 2017. On 27 September 2017, he made his professional debut in a 1–1 draw against Urawa Red Diamonds in the semi-final round of the 2017 AFC Champions League.

== Career statistics ==
As of 21 June 2024.

Appearances and goals by club, season and competition
Club	Season	League			National Cup		Continental		Other		Total	
Club	Season	Division	Apps	Goals	Apps	Goals	Apps	Goals	Apps	Goals	Apps	Goals
Shanghai SIPG/ Shanghai Port	2017	Chinese Super League	0	0	0	0	1	0	—		1	0
Shanghai SIPG/ Shanghai Port	2018	Chinese Super League	0	0	0	0	0	0	—		0	0
Shanghai SIPG/ Shanghai Port	2019	Chinese Super League	0	0	0	0	0	0	0 (Note: Appearances in Chinese FA Super Cup)	0	0	0
Shanghai SIPG/ Shanghai Port	2020	Chinese Super League	7	0	0	0	6	0	—		13	0
Shanghai SIPG/ Shanghai Port	2021	Chinese Super League	2	0	6	0	—		—		8	0
Shanghai SIPG/ Shanghai Port	2022	Chinese Super League	3	0	0	0	—		—		3	0
Shanghai SIPG/ Shanghai Port	2023	Chinese Super League	1	0	0	0	0	0	—		1	0
Shanghai SIPG/ Shanghai Port	2024	Chinese Super League	0	0	1	0	0	0	0	0	1	0
Shanghai SIPG/ Shanghai Port	Total		13	0	7	0	7	0	0	0	27	0
Career total			13	0	7	0	7	0	0	0	27	0

== Honours ==
Shanghai Port

- Chinese Super League: 2018, 2023, 2024, 2025
- Chinese FA Cup: 2024
- Chinese FA Super Cup: 2019

Individual

- Toulon Tournament Best Goalkeeper: 2019
- Toulon Tournament Best XI: 2019
