= Vitrolles, Bouches-du-Rhône =

Commune in Provence-Alpes-Côte d'Azur, France

Vitrolles Vitròla (Occitan)
- Commune
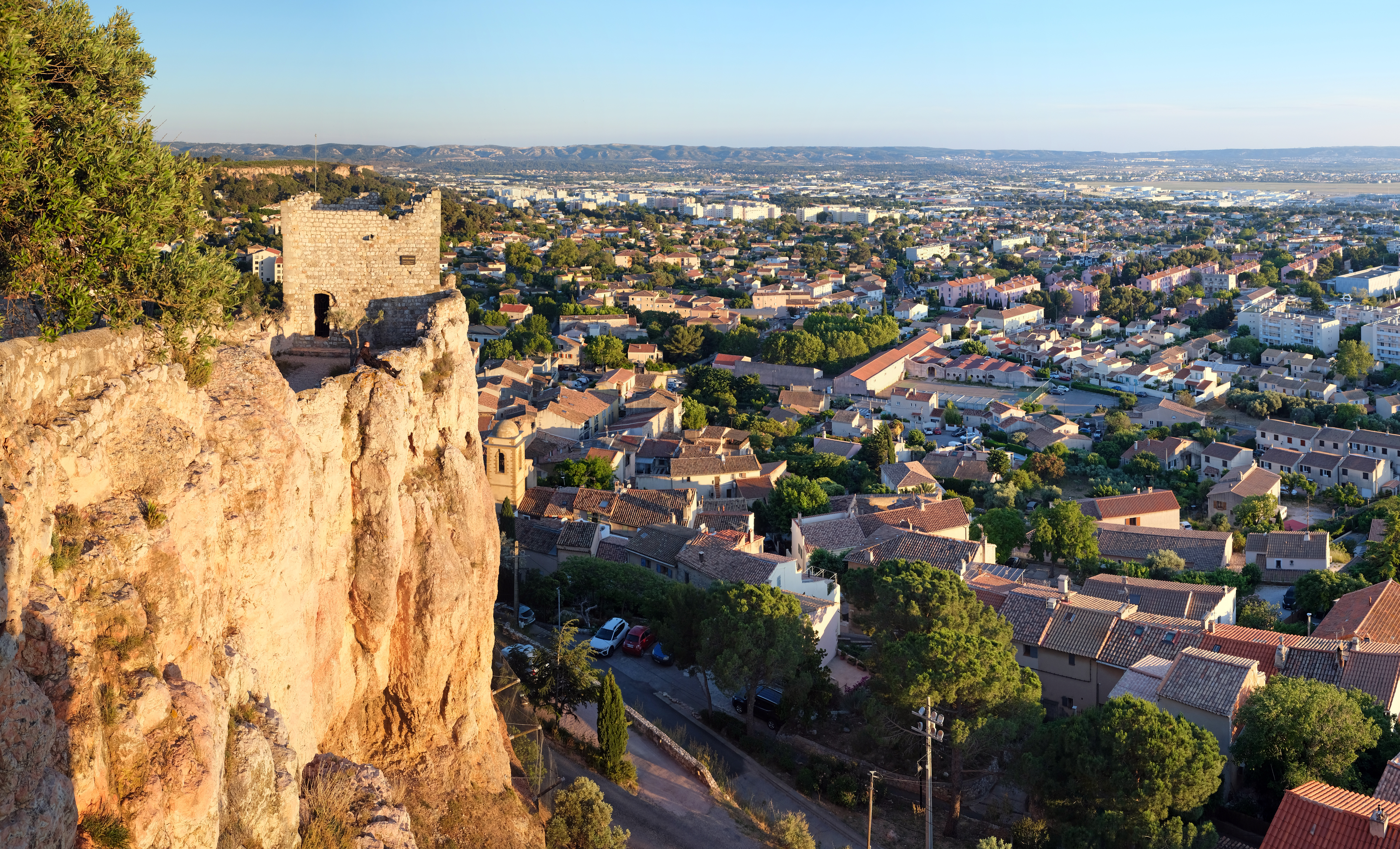
- View of Sarrasine Tower and Vitrolles

- Coat of arms
- Location of Vitrolles
- Location within France Location within Provence-Alpes-Côte d'Azur
- Coordinates: 43°27′36″N 5°14′55″E
- Country: France
- Region: Provence-Alpes-Côte d'Azur
- Department: Bouches-du-Rhône
- Arrondissement: Istres
- Canton: Vitrolles
- Intercommunality: Aix-Marseille-Provence

Government
  - Mayor (2026–32): Loïc Gachon
- Area^{1}: 36.58 km^{2} (14.12 sq mi)
- Highest elevation: 255 m (837 ft)
- Lowest elevation: 0 m (0 ft)
- Population (2023): 36,758
  - Density: 1,005/km^{2} (2,603/sq mi)
- Time zone: UTC+01:00 (CET)
  - Summer (DST): UTC+02:00 (CEST)
- INSEE/Postal code: 13117 /13127
- ^{1} French Land Register data, which excludes lakes, ponds, glaciers > 1 km^{2} (0.386 sq mi or 247 acres) and river estuaries.

Vitrolles (French pronunciation: [vitʁɔl]; Occitan: Vitròla) is a commune in the Bouches-du-Rhône département in the Provence-Alpes-Côte d'Azur region in southern France, located about 20.6 km (12.8 mi) from Marseille. It is the largest suburb of the city of Aix-en-Provence and is adjacent to its southwest side.

== History ==
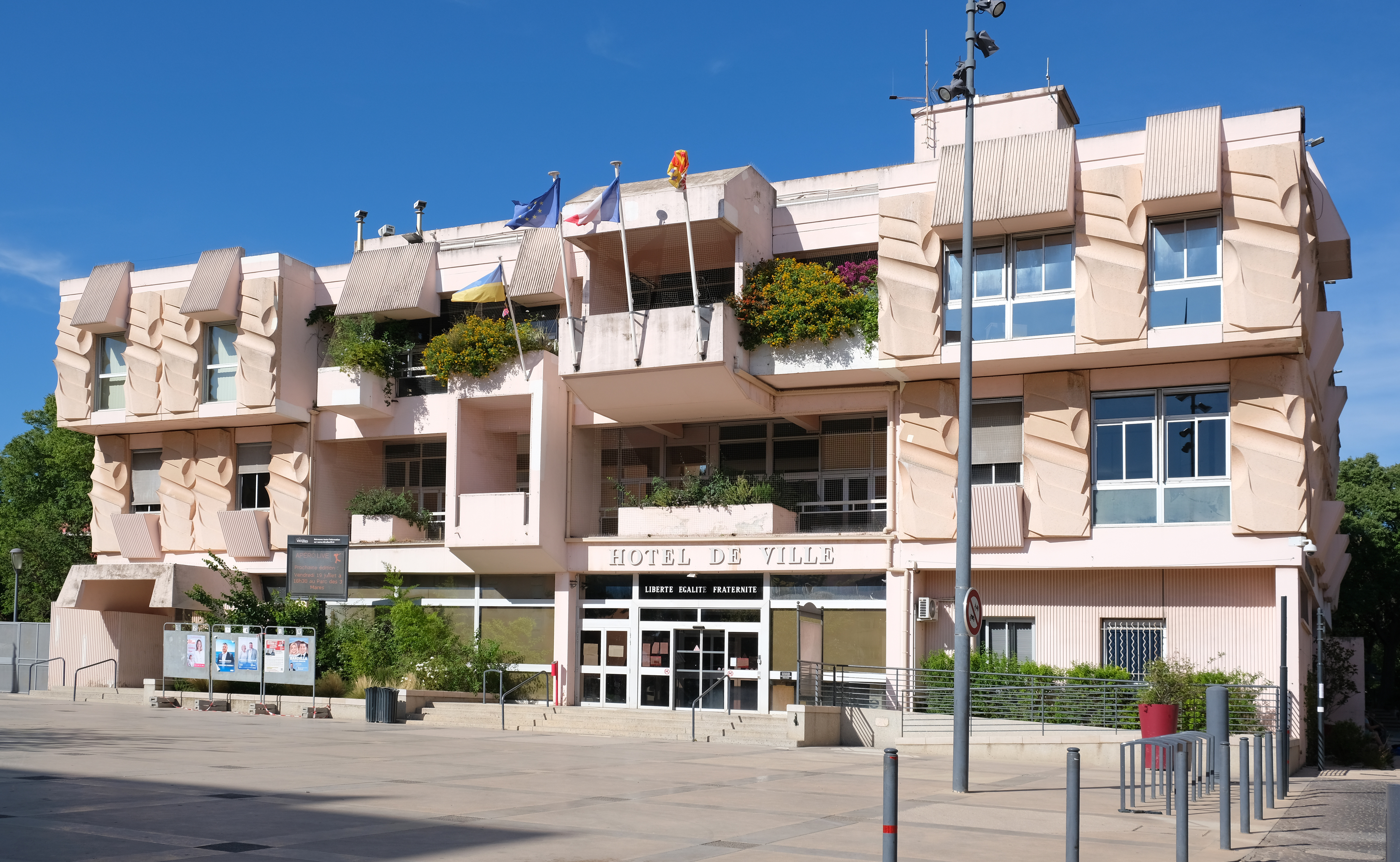
The Hôtel de Ville

The Hôtel de Ville was completed in 1977.

== Population ==
Historical population

Year	Pop.	±% p.a.
1793	1,045	—
1800	972	−1.03%
1806	1,058	+1.42%
1821	1,209	+0.89%
1831	1,244	+0.29%
1836	1,124	−2.01%
1841	1,128	+0.07%
1846	1,213	+1.46%
1851	1,200	−0.22%
1856	1,176	−0.40%
1861	1,148	−0.48%
1866	1,339	+3.13%
1872	1,256	−1.06%
1876	1,082	−3.66%
1881	1,010	−1.37%
1886	1,007	−0.06%
1891	910	−2.01%
1896	910	+0.00%
1901	892	−0.40%

Year	Pop.	±% p.a.
1906	875	−0.38%
1911	819	−1.31%
1921	794	−0.31%
1926	812	+0.45%
1931	841	+0.70%
1936	819	−0.53%
1946	1,293	+4.67%
1954	2,523	+8.72%
1962	3,366	+3.67%
1968	5,050	+6.99%
1975	13,413	+14.98%
1982	22,725	+7.82%
1990	35,397	+5.70%
1999	36,784	+0.43%
2007	37,479	+0.23%
2012	34,843	−1.45%
2017	33,310	−0.90%
2023	36,758	+1.66%

Source: EHESS and INSEE (1968-2023)

== Twin towns – sister cities ==
Vitrolles is twinned with:

- Mörfelden-Walldorf, Germany

== Administration ==
List of mayors of Vitrolles:

- 1800–1808: Paul Gueidon
- 1808–1812: Pierre Joseph Gabriel Bertrand
- 1813–1817: Louis Barrigue de Monvalon
- 1817–1823: Jacques Pierre Hilarion Audibert
- 1824–1830: Louis Martin
- 1830–1831: Honoré-Etienne Emery
- 1831–1837: Hyppolite Baret
- 1837–1842: André Guilhen
- 1842–1844: Joseph Constant
- 1844–1846: Barthélemy Bontoux
- 1847–1848: Jean-Etienne Bonsignour
- 1848–1848: Casimir Berard
- 1848–1850: Jean-Joseph Audibert
- 1850–1850: Louis Faren
- 1850–1863: Honoré Lataud
- 1863–1865: Jean-Pierre Christophe
- 1865–1867: Jules Aimard
- 1867–1870: Jean Antoine Audibert
- 1870–1874: François Hilaire Touche
- 1874–1878: Lucien Sauvat
- 1878–1892: François Hilaire Touche
- 1892–1908: Vital Rouard
- 1908–1912: Pierre Gustave Constant
- 1912–1925: Cyprien Touche
- 1825–1944: Jules Guibaud
- 1944–1954: Henri Loubet
- 1954–1966: Victor Martin
- 1966–1977: Henri Bremond
- 1977–1983: Pierre Scelles
- 1983–1997: Jean-Jacques Anglade
- 1997–2002: Catherine Mégret
- 2002–2009: Guy Obino

== See also ==
- Charlie Jazz Festival
- Communes of the Bouches-du-Rhône department
- Étang de Berre
