= Mohammad Abu Shanab =

Qatari professional footballer (born 1998)

Personal information
- Full name: Mohammad Ismail Abu Shanab
- Date of birth: 25 August 1998 (age 28)
- Position: Forward

Team information
- Current team: Al-Waab (on loan from Al Shahaniya)
- Number: 21

Senior career*
Years	Team	Apps	(Gls)
2017–2022	Al-Gharafa	8	(0)
2022–2023	Lusail		
2023–	Al Shahaniya		
2025–	→ Al-Waab (loan)		

International career^{‡}
2019	Qater U23	3	(0)
- * Club domestic league appearances and goals as of 11:26, 9 January 2020 (UTC) ‡ National team caps and goals as of 11:26, 9 January 2020 (UTC)

Mohammad Ismail Abu Shanab (Arabic: محمد اسماعيل ابو شنب; born 25 August 1998), is a Qatari professional footballer who plays for Al-Waab, on loan from Al Shahaniya as a forward.

== Career statistics ==
=== Club ===
As of 9 January 2020.

Club	Season	League			Cup		Continental		Other		Total	
Club	Season	Division	Apps	Goals	Apps	Goals	Apps	Goals	Apps	Goals	Apps	Goals
Al-Gharafa	2016–17	Qatar Stars League	1	0	0	0	0	0	0	0	1	0
Al-Gharafa	2017–18	Qatar Stars League	2	0	4 (Note: Appearances in the Qatar Cup)	1	0	0	0	0	6	1
Al-Gharafa	2018–19	Qatar Stars League	2	0	0	0	0	0	0	0	2	0
Al-Gharafa	2019–20	Qatar Stars League	0	0	0	0	0	0	0	0	0	0
Career total			5	0	4	1	0	0	0	0	9	1
