= Yann Godart =

French footballer (born 2001)

Personal information
- Date of birth: 19 September 2001 (age 25)
- Place of birth: Bar-le-Duc, France
- Height: 1.83 m (6 ft 0 in)
- Position: Right-back

Team information
- Current team: Mondorf-les-Bains
- Number: 19

Youth career
- 2007–2012: Revigny
- 2012–2014: Bar
- 2014–2020: Metz

Senior career*
Years	Team	Apps	(Gls)
2019–2020	Metz B	11	(2)
2020–2021	Metz	0	(0)
2020–2021	→ Seraing (loan)	6	(0)
2021–2023	Avranches B	4	(1)
2021–2023	Avranches	45	(1)
2023–2024	Haguenau	9	(0)
2024	SAS Épinal	12	(0)
2024–	Mondorf-les-Bains	52	(5)

International career
2016–2017	France U16	15	(0)
2017–2018	France U17	11	(0)
2018–2019	France U18	9	(1)
2019–2020	France U19	7	(0)
- * Club domestic league appearances and goals as of 13 June 2026

Yann Godart (born 19 September 2001) is a French professional footballer who plays as a right-back for Mondorf-les-Bains in the Luxembourg National Division.

== Career statistics ==
As of match played 20 August 2021

Club	Season	League			Cup		Other		Total	
Club	Season	Division	Apps	Goals	Apps	Goals	Apps	Goals	Apps	Goals
Metz B	2019–20	Championnat National 3	11	2	—		—		11	2
Seraing (loan)	2020–21	Belgian First Division B	6	0	0	0	1 (Note: Appearances in the Belgian First Division A promotion-relegation play-off.)	0	7	0
Avranches	2021–22	Championnat National	1	0	0	0	0	0	1	0
Career total			18	2	0	0	1	0	19	2
