= Bernardo Sousa (footballer) =

Portuguese footballer

Personal information
- Full name: Bernardo Martins Sousa
- Date of birth: 27 March 2000 (age 26)
- Place of birth: Treixedo, Portugal
- Height: 1.74 m (5 ft 9 in)
- Positions: Midfielder; winger

Team information
- Current team: Batman Petrolspor
- Number: 77

Youth career
- 2009–2011: Porto
- 2011–2012: O Pinguinzinho
- 2012–2020: Sporting CP

Senior career*
Years	Team	Apps	(Gls)
2020–2022	Sporting CP B	18	(1)
2022–2024	Chaves	58	(1)
2024–2026	Ümraniyespor	68	(12)
2026–	Batman Petrolspor	11	(1)

International career^{‡}
2015	Portugal U15	2	(0)
2015–2016	Portugal U16	9	(0)
2016–2017	Portugal U17	14	(1)
2018	Portugal U18	6	(0)
2018–2019	Portugal U19	10	(3)
- * Club domestic league appearances and goals as of 18 October 2026 ‡ National team caps and goals as of 21:32, 8 December 2022 (UTC)

Bernardo Martins Sousa (born 27 March 2000), sometimes known as Benny, is a Portuguese professional footballer who plays as a midfielder or winger for Turkish TFF 1. Lig club Batman Petrolspor.

== Professional career ==
Sousa is a youth product of Porto, O Pinguinzinho, and Sporting CP. He began his senior career with Sporting CP B in 2020. After a couple of seasons with them, he moved to the Primeira Liga club Chaves on 27 January 2022. He made his professional and senior debut with Chaves in a 1–0 Primeira Liga loss to Vitória F.C. on 7 August 2022.

== International career ==
Sousa is a youth international for Portugal, having played up to the Portugal U19s.
