= Nasser Al Ahrak =

Qatari footballer (born 1999)

Personal information
- Full name: Nasser Abdulsalam Al Ahrak
- Date of birth: 5 January 1999 (age 27)
- Position: Midfielder

Youth career
- –2018: Cultural Leonesa

Senior career*
Years	Team	Apps	(Gls)
2019–2025	Al-Gharafa	56	(0)
2019–2020	→ Al-Khor (loan)	9	(0)
2024–2025	→ Al Shahaniya (loan)	6	(0)
2025–2026	Umm Salal	2	(0)

International career^{‡}
2016–2018	Qatar U19	6	(0)
2018–	Qatar U20	4	(1)
- * Club domestic league appearances and goals as of 17 January 2026 ‡ National team caps and goals as of 11:26, 29 May 2019 (UTC)

Nasser Abdulsalam Al Ahrak (born 5 January 1999), also known as Nasser Abdulsalam, is a Qatari professional footballer who plays as a midfielder.

== Career statistics ==
=== Club ===
As of 29 May 2019.

Club	Season	League			Cup		Continental		Other		Total	
Club	Season	Division	Apps	Goals	Apps	Goals	Apps	Goals	Apps	Goals	Apps	Goals
Al-Gharafa	2018–19	Qatar Stars League	6	0	2 (Note: Appearances in the Qatar Cup)	0	1 (Note: Appearances in AFC Champions League qualifying)	0	0	0	9	0
Career total			6	0	2	0	1	0	0	0	9	0
