= 2025–26 Fenerbahçe S.K. season =

Fenerbahçe 2025/26 season

Fenerbahçe
2025–26 season
- President: Ali Koç (until 25 September); Sadettin Saran (from 25 September)
- Head coach: José Mourinho (until 29 August); Zeki Murat Göle (caretaker) (from 29 August to 9 September); Domenico Tedesco (from 9 September to 27 April); Zeki Murat Göle (caretaker) (from 27 April)
- Stadium: Şükrü Saracoğlu Stadium
- Süper Lig: 2nd
- Turkish Cup: Quarter-finals
- Turkish Super Cup: Winners
- UEFA Champions League: Play-off round
- UEFA Europa League: Knockout phase play-offs
- Top goalscorer: League: Talisca (19); All: Talisca (27)
- Average home league attendance: 38,080
Home colours	Away colours	Third colours

The 2025–26 season was the 119th season in the existence of Fenerbahçe and the club's 68th consecutive season in the top flight of Turkish football. In addition to the domestic league, Fenerbahçe participated in this season's edition of the Turkish Cup, Turkish Super Cup, UEFA Champions League and UEFA Europa League.

== Kits ==
Fenerbahçe's 2025–26 kits, manufactured by Adidas, were unveiled on 1 July 2025 and went on sale on the same day.

- Supplier: Adidas
- Main sponsor: Otokoç
- Main sponsor (Europe): Chobani
- Side sponsor: Safiport
- Back sponsor: Halley
- Sleeve sponsor: Nesine, Alpet
- Sleeve sponsor (Europe): Turkish Airlines
- Shorts sponsor: Gain, Pasha Group
- Socks sponsor: Gedik Yatırım

Home
Home alt.
Away
Away alt.
Third
Fourth
Goalkeeper 1
Goalkeeper 2
Goalkeeper 3

== Players ==
=== First team ===
Italic written players are not included in the UEFA Europa League list in league phase.

N	Pos.	Nat.	Name	Age	EU	Since	App	Goals	Ends	Transfer fee	Notes
Goalkeepers
13	GK	(Turkey)	Tarık Çetin	28	Non-EU	2025	4	0	2026	Free	Originally from youth system
31	GK	(Brazil)	Ederson	32	EU	2025	36	0	2028	€11M	Second nationality: Portuguese
34	GK	(Turkey)	Mert Günok	37	Non-EU	2026 (Winter)	59	0	2028	Free	Originally from youth system
Defenders
3	DF	(England)	Archie Brown	24	Non-EU	2025	38	5	2028	€8M	Second nationality: Jamaican
4	DF	(Turkey)	Çağlar Söyüncü	30	Non-EU	2024 (Winter)	75	4	2027	€8.5M	
14	DF	(Turkey)	Yiğit Efe Demir	21	Non-EU	2025	26	0	2029	Academy	Originally from youth system
18	DF	(Turkey)	Mert Müldür	27	EU	2023	118	5	2027	Free	Second nationality: Austrian
22	DF	(Turkey)	Levent Mercan	25	EU	2024	43	0	2028	Free	Second nationality: German
24	DF	(Netherlands)	Jayden Oosterwolde	25	EU	2023 (Winter)	109	3	2028	€6M	Other nationalities: Surinamese, Indonesian
27	DF	(Portugal)	Nélson Semedo	32	EU	2025	40	1	2027	Free	Second nationality: Cape Verdean
37	DF	(Slovakia)	Milan Škriniar (Vice-captain)	31	EU	2025 (Winter)	63	5	2029	€7M	
Midfielders
5	MF	(Turkey)	İsmail Yüksek	27	Non-EU	2020	157	4	2028	Free	
6	MF	(France)	Mattéo Guendouzi	27	EU	2026 (Winter)	22	2	2030	€28M	Second nationality: Moroccan
7	MF	(Brazil)	Fred	33	Non-EU	2023	125	12	2027	€9.7M	
8	MF	(Turkey)	Mert Hakan Yandaş (Captain)	31	Non-EU	2020	149	11	2026	Free	
11	MF	(Mexico)	Edson Álvarez	28	Non-EU	2025	18	0	2026	Loan	
17	MF	(France)	N'Golo Kanté	35	EU	2026 (Winter)	18	2	2028	Free	Second nationality: Malian
21	MF	(Spain)	Marco Asensio	30	EU	2025	38	13	2028	€7.5M	Second nationality: Dutch
70	MF	(Turkey)	Oğuz Aydın	25	EU	2024	69	7	2028	€6.5M	Second nationality: Dutch
Forwards
9	FW	(Turkey)	Kerem Aktürkoğlu	27	Non-EU	2025	44	15	2029	€22.50M	
20	FW	(Netherlands)	Anthony Musaba	25	EU	2026 (Winter)	23	2	2030	€5M	Second nationality: Congolese
26	FW	(Guinea)	Sidiki Cherif	19	EU	2026 (Winter)	16	3	2026	Loan	Second nationality: French
45	FW	(Mali)	Dorgeles Nene	23	Non-EU	2025	39	11	2030	€18M	Second nationality: Ivorian
94	FW	(Brazil)	Talisca	32	Non-EU	2025 (Winter)	68	39	2028	Free	

- Last updated: 31 May 2026
- Source: Fenerbahce.org
- Ordered by squad number.

=== Academy Players ===
Italic written players are not included in the UEFA Europa League list in group stage.

N	Pos.	Nat.	Name	Age	Since	App	Goals	Ends	Transfer fee	Notes
Goalkeepers
39	GK	(Turkey)	Engin Can Biterge	19	2025	0	0	2028	Academy	Originally from youth system Second nationality: Bulgarian
Defenders
67	DF	(Turkey)	Kamil Efe Üregen	18	2025	4	0	2028	Academy	Originally from youth system
Midfielders
60	MF	(Senegal)	Abdou Aziz Fall	19	2025	0	0	2030	Academy	
83	MF	(Turkey)	Yasir Boz	18	2025	1	0	2028	Academy	Originally from youth system
Forwards
54	FW	(Turkey)	Alaettin Ekici	17	2025	5	0	2028	Academy	Originally from youth system

- Last updated: 31 May 2026
- Source: Fenerbahce.org
- Ordered by squad number.

== Transfers ==
=== In ===
No.	Pos.	Player	Transferred from	Fee	Date	Source
—	FW	(Turkey) Cengiz Ünder	(United States) Los Angeles FC	Loan return	1 July 2025	
—	DF	(Serbia) Ognjen Mimović	(Russia) Zenit Saint Petersburg	Loan return	1 July 2025	
—	MF	(Brazil) Lincoln	(England) Hull City	Loan return	1 July 2025	
—	MF	(Slovenia) Miha Zajc	(France) Toulouse	Loan return	1 July 2025	
—	MF	(Turkey) Bartuğ Elmaz	(Slovenia) Maribor	Loan return	1 July 2025	
—	FW	(Turkey) Emre Mor	(Turkey) Eyüpspor	Loan return	1 July 2025	
—	DF	(Egypt) Omar Fayed	(Belgium) Beerschot	Loan return	1 July 2025	
—	MF	(South Korea) Jo Jin-ho	(Serbia) Radnički Niš	Loan return	1 July 2025	
—	DF	(Turkey) Emir Ortakaya	(Belgium) Beerschot	Loan return	1 July 2025	
—	DF	(Turkey) Yiğit Efe Demir	(Turkey) Fatih Karagümrük	Loan return	1 July 2025	
—	GK	(Turkey) Furkan Onur Akyüz	(Turkey) Fatih Karagümrük	Loan return	1 July 2025	
—	MF	(Turkey) Emre Demir	(Turkey) Sakaryaspor	Loan return	1 July 2025	
34	MF	(Morocco) Sofyan Amrabat	(Italy) Fiorentina	€12,000,000	1 July 2025	
10	FW	(Colombia) Jhon Durán	(Saudi Arabia) Al-Nassr	Loan	6 July 2025	
33	DF	(England) Archie Brown	(Belgium) Gent	€8,000,000	12 July 2025	
25	GK	(Turkey) Tarık Çetin	(Turkey) Çaykur Rizespor	Free transfer	13 July 2025	
27	DF	(Portugal) Nélson Semedo	(England) Wolverhampton Wanderers	Free transfer	31 July 2025	
37	DF	(Slovakia) Milan Škriniar	(France) Paris Saint-Germain	€7,000,000	31 July 2025	
45	FW	(Mali) Dorgeles Nene	(Austria) Red Bull Salzburg	€18,000,000	19 August 2025	
11	MF	(Mexico) Edson Álvarez	(England) West Ham United	Loan	26 August 2025	
9	FW	(Turkey) Kerem Aktürkoğlu	(Portugal) Benfica	€22,500,000	29 August 2025	
21	MF	(Spain) Marco Asensio	(France) Paris Saint-Germain	€7,500,000	1 September 2025	
31	GK	(Brazil) Ederson	(England) Manchester City	€11,000,000	2 September 2025	
20	FW	(Netherlands) Anthony Musaba	(Turkey) Samsunspor	€5,000,000	3 January 2026	
34	GK	(Turkey) Mert Günok	(Turkey) Beşiktaş	Free transfer	8 January 2026	
6	MF	(France) Mattéo Guendouzi	(Italy) Lazio	€28,000,000	8 January 2026	
26	FW	(Guinea) Sidiki Cherif	(France) Angers	Loan	1 February 2026	
17	MF	(France) N'Golo Kanté	(Saudi Arabia) Al-Ittihad	Free transfer	4 February 2026	

Total expenditure: ▼€91.0 million (excluding potential add-ons, bonuses and undisclosed figures)

=== Out ===
No.	Pos.	Player	Transferred to	Fee	Date	Source
9	FW	(Bosnia and Herzegovina) Edin Džeko	(Italy) Fiorentina	End of contract	1 July 2025	
10	MF	(Serbia) Dušan Tadić	(United Arab Emirates) Al Wahda	End of contract	1 July 2025	
—	DF	(Turkey) Serdar Aziz	Retired	End of contract	1 July 2025	
—	DF	(South Korea) Jo Jin-ho	(Turkey) Konyaspor	End of contract	1 July 2025	
37	DF	(Slovakia) Milan Škriniar	(France) Paris Saint-Germain	Loan return	1 July 2025	
97	FW	(France) Allan Saint-Maximin	(Saudi Arabia) Al-Ahli	Loan return	1 July 2025	
18	MF	(Serbia) Filip Kostić	(Italy) Juventus	Loan return	1 July 2025	
21	DF	(Nigeria) Bright Osayi-Samuel	(England) Birmingham City	End of contract	4 July 2025	
—	MF	(Turkey) Emre Demir	(Turkey) Sakaryaspor	Loan	22 July 2025	
—	MF	(Slovenia) Miha Zajc	(Croatia) Dinamo Zagreb	Mutual agreement	4 August 2025	
—	MF	(Brazil) Lincoln	(Portugal) Alverca	Mutual agreement	8 August 2025	
—	DF	(Egypt) Omar Fayed	(Portugal) Arouca	Loan	14 August 2025	
3	DF	(Brazil) Diego Carlos	(Italy) Como	Loan	1 September 2025	
95	DF	(Turkey) Yusuf Akçiçek	(Saudi Arabia) Al Hilal	€22,000,000	1 September 2025	
34	MF	(Morocco) Sofyan Amrabat	(Spain) Real Betis	Loan	2 September 2025	
40	GK	(Croatia) Dominik Livaković	(Spain) Girona	Loan	2 September 2025	
20	FW	(Turkey) Cengiz Ünder	(Turkey) Beşiktaş	Loan	8 September 2025	
—	DF	(Serbia) Ognjen Mimović	(Cyprus) Pafos	Loan	8 September 2025	
6	DF	(Ghana) Alexander Djiku	(Russia) Spartak Moscow	€2,500,000	9 September 2025	
17	MF	(Turkey) İrfan Kahveci	(Turkey) Kasımpaşa	Loan	8 January 2026	
1	GK	(Turkey) İrfan Can Eğribayat	(Turkey) Samsunspor	Loan	9 January 2026	
23	FW	(Turkey) Cenk Tosun	(Turkey) Kasımpaşa	Mutual agreement	15 January 2026	
50	DF	(Brazil) Rodrigo Becão	(Turkey) Kasımpaşa	Loan	17 January 2026	
53	MF	(Poland) Sebastian Szymański	(France) Stade Rennais	€9,500,000	22 January 2026	
28	MF	(Turkey) Bartuğ Elmaz	(Turkey) Fatih Karagümrük	Loan	23 January 2026	
96	MF	(Turkey) Haydar Karataş	(Turkey) Sakaryaspor	Loan	24 January 2026	
40	GK	(Croatia) Dominik Livaković	(Croatia) Dinamo Zagreb	Loan	30 January 2026	
19	FW	(Morocco) Youssef En-Nesyri	(Saudi Arabia) Al-Ittihad	€15,000,000	4 February 2026	
10	FW	(Colombia) Jhon Durán	(Russia) Zenit Saint Petersburg	Contract termination	9 February 2026	

Total income: ▲€49 million (excluding potential add-ons, bonuses and undisclosed figures)

=== Contract renewals ===
No.	Pos.	Nat.	Player	Age	Status	Contract length	Contract ends	Source
94	FW	(Brazil)	Talisca	32	Extended	Two-year	30 June 2028	

== Pre-season and friendlies ==
Win Draw Loss Fixtures

=== Pre-season ===
12 July 2025 Friendly	Fenerbahçe (Turkey)	2–2	(Turkey) Fatih Karagümrük	Istanbul, Turkey
20:00 TRT (UTC+3)	Ünder 11'; En-Nesyri 69'	Report		Stadium: Can Bartu Facilities

17 July 2025 Friendly	Portimonense (Portugal)	1–2	(Turkey) Fenerbahçe	Portimão, Portugal
20:00 WEST (UTC+1)	Bento (yellow card) 28'; Bengue (yellow card) 41'; Acquah (yellow card) 44'; Monteiro 90'	Report	Szymański 20', 62'; Kahveci (yellow card) 44'	Stadium: Estádio Municipal de Portimão

20 July 2025 Friendly	Sunderland (England)	Cancelled	(Turkey) Fenerbahçe	Portugal
20:00 WEST (UTC+1)

20 July 2025 Friendly	União de Leiria (Portugal)	0–2	(Turkey) Fenerbahçe	Albufeira, Portugal
20:00 WEST (UTC+1)	Rofino (yellow card) 73'	Report	Zé Vitor 57' (o.g.); Demir (yellow card) 80'; Amrabat (yellow card) 85'; Söyüncü (yellow card) 90'; Kahveci 90+3'	Stadium: Estádio Municipal de Albufeira

23 July 2025 Friendly	Al-Ittihad (Saudi Arabia)	0–4	(Turkey) Fenerbahçe	Portimão, Portugal
20:00 WEST (UTC+1)		Report	En-Nesyri 9'; Szymański 16'; Durán 77', 88'	Stadium: Estádio Municipal de Portimão

26 July 2025 Eusébio Cup	Benfica (Portugal)	3–2	(Turkey) Fenerbahçe	Lisbon, Portugal
20:00 WEST (UTC+1)	Aktürkoğlu 37'; Brown 42' (o.g.); Araújo 81'	Report	Kahveci 45'; En-Nesyri 60'	Stadium: Estádio da Luz; Referee: Hélder Carvalho

30 July 2025 Friendly	Fenerbahçe (Turkey)	1–0	(Italy) Lazio	Istanbul, Turkey
20:30 TRT (UTC+3)	Kahveci 60'	Report		Stadium: Şükrü Saracoğlu Stadium

== Competitions ==
=== Overall record ===
Competition	First match	Last match	Starting round	Final position	Record							
Competition	First match	Last match	Starting round	Final position	Pld	W	D	L	GF	GA	GD	Win %
Süper Lig	9 August 2025	17 May 2026	Matchday 1	2nd	34	21	11	2	77	37	+40	61.76
Turkish Cup	23 December 2025	21 April 2026	Group stage	Quarter-finals	5	3	0	2	9	4	+5	60.00
Turkish Super Cup	6 January 2026	10 January 2026	Semi-finals	Winners	2	2	0	0	4	0	+4	100.00
UEFA Champions League	6 August 2025	27 August 2025	Third qualifying round	Play-off round	4	1	1	2	6	5	+1	25.00
UEFA Europa League	24 September 2025	26 February 2026	League phase	Knockout phase play-offs	10	4	3	3	12	11	+1	40.00
Total					55	31	15	9	108	57	+51	56.36

Source: Competitions

=== Süper Lig ===
==== League table ====
Pos	Team	Pld	W	D	L	GF	GA	GD	Pts	Qualification or relegation
1	Galatasaray (C)	34	24	5	5	77	30	+47	77	Qualification for the Champions League league phase
2	Fenerbahçe	34	21	11	2	77	37	+40	74	Qualification for the Champions League second qualifying round
3	Trabzonspor	34	20	9	5	61	39	+22	69	Qualification for the Europa League play-off round (Note: The 2025–26 Turkish Cup winners qualified for the Europa League play-off round. Since the cup winners (Trabzonspor) qualified based on league position, the Europa League play-off round spot was passed to the third-placed team, the Europa League second round spot was passed to the fourth-placed team, and the Conference League spot was passed to the fifth-placed team.)
4	Beşiktaş	34	17	9	8	59	40	+19	60	Qualification for the Europa League second qualifying round
5	Başakşehir	34	16	9	9	58	35	+23	57	Qualification for the Conference League second qualifying round

Source: Süper Lig
Rules for classification: 1) Points; 2) Head-to-head points; 3) Head-to-head goal difference; 4) Head-to-head goals scored; 5) Goal difference; 6) Goals scored; 7) Play-off.
(Note: Head-to-head record is used only after all the matches between the teams in question have been played)
(C) Champions

==== Results summary ====
Overall								Home						Away					
Pld	W	D	L	GF	GA	GD	Pts	W	D	L	GF	GA	GD	W	D	L	GF	GA	GD
34	21	11	2	77	37	+40	74	11	6	0	40	19	+21	10	5	2	37	18	+19

Source: TFF.org

Pld = Matches played; W = Matches won; D = Matches drawn; L = Matches lost; GF = Goals for; GA = Goals against; GD = Goal difference; Pts = Points

==== Results by round ====
Round	1	2	3	4	5	6	7	8	9	10	11	12	13	14	15	16	17	18	19	20	21	22	23	24	25	26	27	28	29	30	31	32	33	34
Ground	H	A	H	A	H	A	H	A	H	A	A	H	A	H	A	H	A	A	H	A	H	A	H	A	H	A	H	H	A	H	A	H	A	H
Result	D	D	W	W	W	D	W	D	W	W	W	W	W	D	D	W	W	W	D	W	W	W	D	D	W	L	W	W	W	D	L	W	W	D
Position	10	11	7	5	2	3	2	4	3	3	2	2	2	2	3	2	2	2	2	2	2	2	2	2	2	2	2	2	2	2	2	2	2	2

Source: TFF.org
A = Away; H = Home; W = Win; D = Draw; L = Loss; P = Postponed

==== Matches ====
17 September 2025 1	Fenerbahçe	2–2	Alanyaspor	Istanbul
20:00 TRT (UTC+3)	Talisca (penalty missed) 57'; Semedo 72'; En-Nesyri 76'; Škriniar (yellow card) 90+6'	Report	Kaya 18'; Ogundu (yellow card) 62'; Akdağ (yellow card) 86'; Özdemir 90+3'	Stadium: Şükrü Saracoğlu Stadium; Referee: Cihan Aydın
Note: The match, originally scheduled for 9 August 2025, at 21:00 (UTC+3), was postponed to a later date due to Fenerbahçe's participation in European competitions.

16 August 2025 2	Göztepe	0–0	Fenerbahçe	İzmir
21:30 TRT (UTC+3)	Allan (yellow card) 40'; Kurtulan (yellow card) 43'; Juan (yellow card) 53' (yellow-red card) 61'; Köybaşı (yellow card) 65' (yellow-red card) 66'; Bokele (yellow card) 89'	Report	En-Nesyri (yellow card) 20'; Durán (yellow card) 42'; Oosterwolde (yellow card) 59' (yellow-red card) 85'; Kahveci (yellow card) 90+1'; Talisca (penalty missed) 90+5'	Stadium: Gürsel Aksel Stadium; Referee: Yasin Kol

23 August 2025 3	Fenerbahçe	3–1	Kocaelispor	Istanbul
21:30 TRT (UTC+3)	Škriniar 5'; Brown 51'; Semedo (yellow card) 59'; Talisca 66'	Report	Petković 22'; Keleş (yellow card) 35'; Bingöl (yellow card) 46'; Show (yellow card) 55'	Stadium: Şükrü Saracoğlu Stadium; Referee: Mehmet Türkmen

31 August 2025 4	Gençlerbirliği	1–3	Fenerbahçe	Ankara
19:00 TRT (UTC+3)	Žužek (yellow card) 60'; Goutas 64'	Report	Nene 14'; En-Nesyri 35', 40'	Stadium: Eryaman Stadium; Referee: Çağdaş Altay

14 September 2025 5	Fenerbahçe	1–0	Trabzonspor	Istanbul
19:00 TRT (UTC+3)	Yüksek (yellow card) 41'; En-Nesyri 45'; Elmaz (yellow card) 67'; Brown (yellow card) 81'; Škriniar (yellow card) 90+7'	Report	Onuachu (yellow card) 15'; Yokuşlu (red card) 20'; Savić (yellow card) 31'; Jabol-Folcarelli (yellow card) 81'	Stadium: Şükrü Saracoğlu Stadium; Referee: Ozan Ergün

21 September 2025 6	Kasımpaşa	1–1	Fenerbahçe	Istanbul
20:00 TRT (UTC+3)	Kol (yellow card) 21'; Cafú (red card) 45'; Winck (yellow card) 45+3'; Hajradinović 64', (yellow card) 90+7'	Report	Asensio 3'; Oosterwolde (yellow card) 90+7'	Stadium: Recep Tayyip Erdoğan Stadium; Referee: Oğuzhan Çakır

28 September 2025 7	Fenerbahçe	2–0	Antalyaspor	Istanbul
20:00 TRT (UTC+3)	Oosterwolde (yellow card) 52'; Talisca 65' (pen.); Asensio (yellow card) 78'; Ederson (yellow card) 90+1'; Szymański 90+2'; Škriniar (yellow card) 90+5'	Report	Dikmen (yellow card) 23'; Safouri (yellow card) 41'; Ballet (yellow card) 55'; Balcı (yellow card) 63'; Paal (yellow card) 63'; Giannetti (yellow card) 90+3'	Stadium: Şükrü Saracoğlu Stadium; Referee: Ali Yılmaz

5 October 2025 8	Samsunspor	0–0	Fenerbahçe	Samsun
20:00 TRT (UTC+3)		Report	Škriniar (yellow card) 50'; Yüksek (yellow card) 85'; Semedo (yellow card) 90+4'	Stadium: Samsun 19 Mayıs Stadium; Referee: Halil Umut Meler

19 October 2025 9	Fenerbahçe	2–1	Fatih Karagümrük	Istanbul
20:00 TRT (UTC+3)	Talisca 23' (pen.); Asensio 41'; Nene (yellow card) 45'; Çetin (yellow card) 90+2'	Report	Çankaya (yellow card) 11'; Balkovec (yellow card) 21' (yellow-red card) 83'; Roco (yellow card) 45+1'; Çınar (yellow card) 55'	Stadium: Şükrü Saracoğlu Stadium; Referee: Ali Şansalan

27 October 2025 10	Gaziantep	0–4	Fenerbahçe	Gaziantep
20:00 TRT (UTC+3)	Sorescu (yellow card) 72'; Abena (red card) 86'; Rodrigues (yellow card) 87'	Report	En-Nesyri 5', 22'; Brown (yellow card) 6'; Álvarez (yellow card) 25'; Škriniar (yellow card) 43'; Yüksek (yellow card) 47'; Oosterwolde (yellow card) 72'; Talisca 81', 88'	Stadium: Gaziantep Stadium; Referee: Atilla Karaoğlan

2 November 2025 11	Beşiktaş	2–3	Fenerbahçe	Istanbul
20:00 TRT (UTC+3)	Touré 5'; Topçu 22', (yellow card) 90+1'; Kökçü (red card) 26'	Report	Yüksek 32', (yellow card) 90+3'; Semedo (yellow card) 35'; Asensio 45+3'; Álvarez (yellow card) 68'; Aktürkoğlu (yellow card) 78'; Durán 83', (yellow card) 83'	Stadium: Beşiktaş Stadium; Referee: Ali Yılmaz

9 November 2025 12	Fenerbahçe	4–2	Kayserispor	Istanbul
20:00 TRT (UTC+3)	Asensio 38'; Nene 40', 50'; Semedo (yellow card) 46'; Aktürkoğlu 63'	Report	Mané (yellow card) 23'; Bennasser (yellow card) 31'; Onugkha 53', 74'; Opoku (yellow card) 80'	Stadium: Şükrü Saracoğlu Stadium; Referee: Ozan Ergün

23 November 2025 13	Çaykur Rizespor	2–5	Fenerbahçe	Rize
20:00 TRT (UTC+3)	Sowe 6'; Laçi 15', (yellow card) 57' (yellow-red card) 63'	Report	Yüksek (yellow card) 52'; Asensio 55', 65'; Talisca 58'; En-Nesyri 78'; Brown 88'	Stadium: Rize City Stadium; Referee: Çağdaş Altay

1 December 2025 14	Fenerbahçe	1–1	Galatasaray	Istanbul
20:00 TRT (UTC+3)	Semedo (yellow card) 36'; Oosterwolde (yellow card) 54'; Ederson (yellow card) 66'; Durán 90+6'	Report	Sané 27'; Lemina (yellow card) 40'; Yılmaz (yellow card) 63'; Osimhen (yellow card) 71'; Çakır (yellow card) 78'	Stadium: Şükrü Saracoğlu Stadium; Referee: Yasin Kol

6 December 2025 15	İstanbul Başakşehir	1–1	Fenerbahçe	Istanbul
20:00 TRT (UTC+3)	Harit (yellow card) 17'; Fayzullaev (yellow card) 46'; Yıldırım 81'	Report	Álvarez (yellow card) 29'; Mercan (yellow card) 52'; Škriniar 64'; Brown (yellow card) 73'	Stadium: Başakşehir Fatih Terim Stadium; Referee: Adnan Deniz Kayatepe

15 December 2025 16	Fenerbahçe	4–0	Konyaspor	Istanbul
20:00 TRT (UTC+3)	Talisca 28' (pen.), 37'; Müldür 30'; Fred (yellow card) 34'; Aktürkoğlu (yellow card) 42'; Asensio 87'	Report	Jin-ho (yellow card) 8'; Yazğılı (yellow card) 48'	Stadium: Şükrü Saracoğlu Stadium; Referee: Ozan Ergün

20 December 2025 17	Eyüpspor	0–3	Fenerbahçe	Istanbul
17:00 TRT (UTC+3)	Ortakaya (yellow card) 42'; İlter (yellow card) 90'	Report	Talisca 27'; Asensio 34'; Durán 75'; Müldür (yellow card) 90+2'	Stadium: Atatürk Olympic Stadium; Referee: Ali Yılmaz

18 January 2026 18	Alanyaspor	2–3	Fenerbahçe	Alanya
20:00 TRT (UTC+3)	Hadergjonaj 3'; Makouta 27', (yellow card) 41'; Karaca (yellow card) 28'	Report	Talisca 9', 78'; Musaba 52'	Stadium: Alanya Oba Stadium; Referee: Mehmet Türkmen

25 January 2026 19	Fenerbahçe	1–1	Göztepe	Istanbul
20:00 TRT (UTC+3)	Demir (yellow card) 5'; Nene 17'; Škriniar (yellow card) 72'; Semedo (yellow card) 80'	Report	Godói (yellow card) 3'; Janderson 24'; Bekiroğlu (yellow card) 64'; Rhaldney (yellow card) 74'; Lis (yellow card) 84'	Stadium: Şükrü Saracoğlu Stadium; Referee: Cihan Aydın

2 February 2026 20	Kocaelispor	0–2	Fenerbahçe	Kocaeli
20:00 TRT (UTC+3)	Rivas (yellow card) 26'; Linetty (yellow card) 45+4'	Report	Álvarez (yellow card) 13'; Asensio 45+1'; Müldür (yellow card) 56'; Nene 75'; Aktürkoğlu (yellow card) 89'	Stadium: Kocaeli Stadium; Referee: Alper Akarsu

9 February 2026 21	Fenerbahçe	3–1	Gençlerbirliği	Istanbul
20:00 TRT (UTC+3)	Talisca 16' (pen.); Aktürkoğlu 27', 33'; Oosterwolde (yellow card) 44'; Demir (yellow card) 79'	Report	Koïta 55'; Pereira (yellow card) 67'; Onyekuru (yellow card) 79'	Stadium: Şükrü Saracoğlu Stadium; Referee: Ali Şansalan

14 February 2026 22	Trabzonspor	2–3	Fenerbahçe	Trabzon
20:00 TRT (UTC+3)	Muçi 6'; Augusto (yellow card) 39'; Onuachu 43'; Onana (yellow card) 44'; Løvik (yellow card) 45'; Inao (yellow card) 51'	Report	Talisca 15', (yellow card) 36'; Aktürkoğlu 34'; Guendouzi (yellow card) 44'; Asensio 48'; Müldür (yellow card) 66'; Ederson (yellow card) 85'; Semedo (yellow card) 90+4'	Stadium: Papara Park; Referee: Halil Umut Meler

23 February 2026 23	Fenerbahçe	1–1	Kasımpaşa	Istanbul
20:00 TRT (UTC+3)	Kanté (yellow card) 80'; Asensio 90+5', (yellow card) 90+5'; Guendouzi (yellow card) 90+6'	Report	Diabaté (yellow card) 38'; Baldursson (yellow card) 41'; Frimpong (yellow card) 42'; Tosun (yellow card) 70'; Cafú (yellow card) 86'; Ben Ouanes (yellow card) 82' (yellow-red card) 90+3'; Allevinah 90+10'	Stadium: Şükrü Saracoğlu Stadium; Referee: Yasin Kol

1 March 2026 24	Antalyaspor	2–2	Fenerbahçe	Antalya
20:00 TRT (UTC+3)	Mercan 43' (o.g.); van de Streek 49'	Report	Cherif 63'; Sarı 69' (o.g.)	Stadium: Corendon Airlines Park; Referee: Alper Akarsu

8 March 2026 25	Fenerbahçe	3–2	Samsunspor	Istanbul
20:00 TRT (UTC+3)	Guendouzi 15', (yellow card) 90+6'; Ederson (yellow card) 46'; Nene 89'; Cherif 90+5'	Report	Marius 11', 23'; Çift (yellow card) 16'; Mendes (yellow card) 44'; Borevković (yellow card) 51'; van Drongelen (yellow card) 62'; Makoumbou (yellow card) 90+6'; Kocuk (yellow card) 90+6'; Kayan (yellow card) 90+9'	Stadium: Şükrü Saracoğlu Stadium; Referee: Oğuzhan Çakır

13 March 2026 26	Fatih Karagümrük	2–0	Fenerbahçe	Istanbul
20:00 TRT (UTC+3)	Elmaz 15'; Serginho 45+1', (yellow card) 51'	Report	Oosterwolde (yellow card) 50'; Kanté (yellow card) 82'; Aydın (yellow card) 90+7'	Stadium: Atatürk Olympic Stadium; Referee: Mehmet Türkmen

17 March 2026 27	Fenerbahçe	4–1	Gaziantep	Istanbul
20:00 TRT (UTC+3)	Nene 41', 68', 79', (yellow card) 44'; Kanté 59'	Report	Maxim 52' (pen.)	Stadium: Şükrü Saracoğlu Stadium; Referee: Kadir Sağlam

5 April 2026 28	Fenerbahçe	1–0	Beşiktaş	Istanbul
20:00 TRT (UTC+3)	Nene (yellow card) 68'; Oosterwolde (yellow card) 82'; Aktürkoğlu 90+11' (pen.); Ederson (yellow card) 90+14'	Report	Destanoğlu (yellow card) 45+5'; Ndidi (yellow card) 52'; Yılmaz (yellow card) 78'; Agbadou (yellow card) 90+8'; Ünder (yellow card) 90+10'	Stadium: Şükrü Saracoğlu Stadium; Referee: Yasin Kol

11 April 2026 29	Kayserispor	0–4	Fenerbahçe	Kayseri
20:00 TRT (UTC+3)	Makarov (yellow card) 33'; Bennasser (yellow card) 47'; Sağlam (yellow card) 67'	Report	Oosterwolde (yellow card) 26'; Fred (yellow card) 33'; Ederson (yellow card) 33'; Kanté 45+1'; Talisca 60', 87'; Nene 62'	Stadium: RHG Enertürk Enerji Stadium; Referee: Ali Yılmaz

17 April 2026 30	Fenerbahçe	2–2	Çaykur Rizespor	Istanbul
20:00 TRT (UTC+3)	Talisca (yellow card) 64', (goal) 80' (pen.); Aktürkoğlu 86'	Report	Taylan (yellow card) 36'; Augusto (yellow card) 38'; Højer (yellow card) 40'; Sowe 47'; Akaydin (yellow card) 61' (yellow-red card) 72'; Mihăilă (yellow card) 68'; Fofana (yellow card) 79'; Canpolat (yellow card) 79'; Sagnan 90+8'	Stadium: Şükrü Saracoğlu Stadium; Referee: Adnan Deniz Kayatepe

26 April 2026 31	Galatasaray	3–0	Fenerbahçe	Istanbul
20:00 TRT (UTC+3)	Çakır (yellow card) 6'; Osimhen 40', (yellow card) 90+6'; Akgün (yellow card) 41'; Yılmaz 67' (pen.), (yellow card) 67'; Torreira 83', (yellow card) 85'	Report	Oosterwolde (yellow card) 6'; Talisca (penalty missed) 13'; Brown (yellow card) 23'; Ederson (yellow card) 23' (yellow-red card) 62'; Guendouzi (yellow card) 90+3'; Müldür (yellow card) 90+6'	Stadium: Rams Park; Referee: Yasin Kol

2 May 2026 32	Fenerbahçe	3–1	İstanbul Başakşehir	Istanbul
20:00 TRT (UTC+3)	Talisca 28', 58', 72'; Oosterwolde (yellow card) 45+2'; Kanté (yellow card) 82'	Report	Harit 36'; Opoku (yellow card) 45+3'; Ba (yellow card) 46'	Stadium: Şükrü Saracoğlu Stadium; Referee: Oğuzhan Aksu

9 May 2026 33	Konyaspor	0–3	Fenerbahçe	Konya
20:00 TRT (UTC+3)	Demirbağ (yellow card) 6'; Türüç (yellow card) 44'; Jevtović (yellow card) 59'; Bazoer (yellow card) 90' (yellow card) FT	Report	Fred 13', 71', (yellow card) 23'; Brown (yellow card) 56'; Aydın (yellow card) 90' (yellow card) FT	Stadium: Konya Metropolitan Municipality Stadium; Referee: Atilla Karaoğlan

17 May 2026 34	Fenerbahçe	3–3	Eyüpspor	Istanbul
20:00 TRT (UTC+3)	Demir (yellow card) 21'; Brown (yellow card) 28'; Musaba (yellow card) 44'; Fred 68'; Aktürkoğlu 79', 82'; Oosterwolde (yellow card) 90+5'; Semedo (yellow card) 90+5'	Report	Łęgowski 17'; Altunbaş 36', (yellow card) 90+5'; Talha 87', (yellow card) 88'; Claro (yellow card) 90+5'	Stadium: Şükrü Saracoğlu Stadium; Referee: Mehmet Türkmen

=== Turkish Cup ===
==== Group stage ====
The draw for the group stage was held on 5 December 2025.

Pos	Team	Pld	W	D	L	GF	GA	GD	Pts	Qualification
1	Beşiktaş	4	3	1	0	10	3	+7	10	Quarter-finals
2	Fenerbahçe	4	3	0	1	9	3	+6	9	Quarter-finals
3	Erzurumspor	4	2	0	2	8	8	0	6	
4	Gaziantep	4	2	0	2	8	10	−2	6	
5	Kocaelispor	4	1	1	2	4	4	0	4	
6	Rizespor	4	1	1	2	7	9	−2	4	
7	Beyoğlu Yeni Çarşı	4	1	1	2	3	5	−2	4	
8	Keçiörengücü	4	1	0	3	6	13	−7	3	

Source: TFF.org

23 December 2025 1	Fenerbahçe	1–2	Beşiktaş	Istanbul
20:30 TRT (UTC+3)	Aydın (yellow card) 36'; Asensio 43' (pen.); Elmaz (yellow card) 61'	Report	Černý 33', 90+1'; Şahin (yellow card) 39'; Abraham (yellow card) 42'	Stadium: Şükrü Saracoğlu Stadium; Referee: Oğuzhan Çakır

14 January 2026 2	Beyoğlu Yeni Çarşı	0–1	Fenerbahçe	Istanbul
20:30 TRT (UTC+3)	Kurtoğlu (yellow card) 78'; Yamaç (yellow card) 84'; Ayhan (yellow card) 88'	Report	Talisca 82'; Müldür (yellow card) 89'	Stadium: Recep Tayyip Erdoğan Stadium; Referee: Turgut Doman

5 February 2026 3	Fenerbahçe	3–1	Erzurumspor	Istanbul
20:30 TRT (UTC+3)	Asensio 52'; Talisca 69', 78' (pen.); Demir (yellow card) 90+2'	Report	Fettahoğlu 40'; Kabak (yellow card) 73'	Stadium: Şükrü Saracoğlu Stadium; Referee: Ömer Faruk Turtay

4 March 2026 4	Gaziantep	0–4	Fenerbahçe	Gaziantep
20:30 TRT (UTC+3)	Kızıldağ (yellow card) 28'	Report	Fred (yellow card) 28'; Musaba 33'; Cherif 52'; Brown (yellow card) 75', (goal) 86'; Nene 79'	Stadium: Gaziantep Stadium; Referee: Adnan Deniz Kayatepe

==== Knockout phase ====
The draw for the quarter-finals and semi-finals was held on 11 March 2026.

21 April 2026 Quarter-finals	Konyaspor	1–0 (a.e.t.)	Fenerbahçe	Konya
20:30 TRT (UTC+3)	Türüç (yellow card) 63'; Güngördü (yellow card) 97'; Jevtović 120+2' (pen.), (yellow card) 120+2'; Demirbağ (yellow card) 120+6'	Report	Guendouzi (yellow card) 117'; Semedo (yellow card) 120'	Stadium: Konya Metropolitan Municipality Stadium; Referee: Ozan Ergün

=== Turkish Super Cup ===
6 January 2026 Semi-finals	Fenerbahçe	2–0	Samsunspor	Adana
20:30 TRT (UTC+3)	Aktürkoğlu 4'; Durán 67'; Aydın (yellow card) 90+3'	Report	Borevković (yellow card) 33'; Makoumbou (red card) 78'	Stadium: New Adana Stadium; Referee: Ali Şansalan

10 January 2026 Final	Galatasaray	0–2	Fenerbahçe	Istanbul
18:45 TRT (UTC+3)	Sánchez (yellow card) 18'; Sallai (yellow card) 34'; Sané (yellow card) 41'; Icardi (yellow card) 83'	Report	Müldür (yellow card) 23'; Guendouzi 28', (yellow card) 78'; Oosterwolde 48', (yellow card) 49'	Stadium: Atatürk Olympic Stadium; Referee: Halil Umut Meler

=== UEFA Champions League ===
==== Third qualifying round ====
The draw for the third qualifying round was held on 21 July 2025.

6 August 2025 First leg	Feyenoord (Netherlands)	2–1	(Turkey) Fenerbahçe	Rotterdam, Netherlands
21:00 CEST (UTC+2)	Timber 19'; Bos (yellow card) 83'; Valente (yellow card) 89'; Hadj Moussa 90+1'; Targhalline (yellow card) 90+4'	Report	Amrabat 86'	Stadium: De Kuip; Attendance: 42,180; Referee: Glenn Nyberg (Sweden)

12 August 2025 Second leg	Fenerbahçe (Turkey)	5–2 (6–4 agg.)	(Netherlands) Feyenoord	Istanbul, Turkey
20:00 TRT (UTC+3)	Amrabat (yellow card) 21'; Brown 44'; Durán 45+2'; Fred 55'; Durán (yellow card) 62'; En-Nesyri 83'; Talisca 90+6'	Report	Sauer (yellow card) 11'; Watanabe 41', 89'; Borges (yellow card) 75'	Stadium: Şükrü Saracoğlu Stadium; Attendance: 39,497; Referee: István Kovács (Romania)

==== Play-off round ====
20 August 2025 First leg	Fenerbahçe (Turkey)	0–0	(Portugal) Benfica	Istanbul, Turkey
20:00 TRT (UTC+3)	Durán (yellow card) 27'; Oosterwolde (yellow card) 90+2'; Kahveci (yellow card) 90+3'	Report	Barrenechea (yellow card) 22'; Ríos (yellow card) 63'; Florentino (yellow card) 69' (yellow-red card) 71'	Stadium: Şükrü Saracoğlu Stadium; Attendance: 41,258; Referee: Daniel Siebert (Germany)

27 August 2025 Second leg	Benfica (Portugal)	1–0 (1–0 agg.)	(Turkey) Fenerbahçe	Lisbon, Portugal
20:00 WEST (UTC+1)	Aktürkoğlu 35'; Barreiro (yellow card) 70'; Silva (yellow card) 85'	Report	Ambrabat (yellow card) 30'; Talisca (yellow card) 79' (yellow-red card) 82'; Söyüncü (yellow card) 87'	Stadium: Estádio da Luz; Attendance: 64,323; Referee: Slavko Vinčić (Slovenia)

=== UEFA Europa League ===
==== League phase ====
The draw for the league phase was held on 29 August 2025.

Pos	Team	Pld	W	D	L	GF	GA	GD	Pts	Qualification
17	(Hellenic Football Federation) PAOK	8	3	3	2	17	14	+3	12	Advance to knockout phase play-offs (unseeded)
18	(French Football Federation) Lille	8	4	0	4	12	9	+3	12	Advance to knockout phase play-offs (unseeded)
19	(Turkish Football Federation) Fenerbahçe	8	3	3	2	10	7	+3	12	Advance to knockout phase play-offs (unseeded)
20	(Hellenic Football Federation) Panathinaikos	8	3	3	2	11	9	+2	12	Advance to knockout phase play-offs (unseeded)
21	(Scottish Football Association) Celtic	8	3	2	3	13	15	−2	11	Advance to knockout phase play-offs (unseeded)

Source: UEFA
Rules for classification: League phase tiebreakers

Overall								Home						Away					
Pld	W	D	L	GF	GA	GD	Pts	W	D	L	GF	GA	GD	W	D	L	GF	GA	GD
8	3	3	2	10	7	+3	12	2	1	1	4	3	+1	1	2	1	6	4	+2

Source: UEFA

Round	1	2	3	4	5	6	7	8
Ground	A	H	H	A	H	A	H	A
Result	L	W	W	D	D	W	L	D
Position	34	20	14	14	20	12	18	19

Source: UEFA
A = Away; H = Home; W = Win; D = Draw; L = Loss

24 September 2025 1	Dinamo Zagreb (Croatia)	3–1	(Turkey) Fenerbahçe	Zagreb, Croatia
21:00 CEST (UTC+2)	Beljo 21', 50', (yellow card) 41'; Valinčić (yellow card) 45'; Bakrar 90+5'	Report	Szymański 25'; Oosterwolde (yellow card) 43'; Aydın (yellow card) 90'; Fred (yellow card) 90+3'	Stadium: Stadion Maksimir; Attendance: 13,926; Referee: Jérôme Brisard (France)

2 October 2025 2	Fenerbahçe (Turkey)	2–1	(France) Nice	Istanbul, Turkey
19:45 TRT (UTC+3)	Aktürkoğlu 3', 25', (yellow card) 77'; Yüksek (yellow card) 69'; Fred (yellow card) 82'	Report	Carlos 37' (pen.); Louchet (yellow card) 55'	Stadium: Şükrü Saracoğlu Stadium; Attendance: 35,523; Referee: Srđan Jovanović (Serbia)

23 October 2025 3	Fenerbahçe (Turkey)	1–0	(Germany) VfB Stuttgart	Istanbul, Turkey
19:45 TRT (UTC+3)	Álvarez (yellow card) 26'; Aktürkoğlu 34' (pen.); Semedo (yellow card) 45+4'; Oosterwolde (yellow card) 82'; Škriniar (yellow card) 86'; Durán (yellow card) 89'; Yüksek (yellow card) 90+8'	Report	El Khannouss (yellow card) 21'; Stiller (yellow card) 32'; Undav (yellow card) 90+8'; Chabot (yellow card) 90+9'	Stadium: Şükrü Saracoğlu Stadium; Attendance: 38,891; Referee: Jakob Kehlet (Denmark)

6 November 2025 4	Viktoria Plzeň (Czech Republic)	0–0	(Turkey) Fenerbahçe	Plzeň, Czech Republic
21:00 CET (UTC+1)	Valenta (yellow card) 35'; Adu (yellow card) 89'; Marković (yellow card) 90+2'	Report	Álvarez (yellow card) 23'; Yüksek (yellow card) 44'; Oosterwolde (yellow card) 48'; Durán (yellow card) 82'; Fred (yellow card) 90+9'	Stadium: Doosan Arena; Attendance: 11,090; Referee: Allard Lindhout (Netherlands)

27 November 2025 5	Fenerbahçe (Turkey)	1–1	(Hungary) Ferencváros	Istanbul, Turkey
20:45 TRT (UTC+3)	Demir (yellow card) 21'; Talisca 69', (yellow card) 90+6'; Škriniar (yellow card) 73'; Semedo (yellow card) 80'; Durán (red card) 90+1'	Report	Zachariassen (yellow card) 42'; Szalai (yellow card) 55'; Varga 66'; O'Dowda (yellow card) 70'; Raemaekers (yellow card) 90+2'	Stadium: Şükrü Saracoğlu Stadium; Attendance: 37,898; Referee: Ricardo de Burgos Bengoetxea (Spain)

11 December 2025 6	Brann (Norway)	0–4	(Turkey) Fenerbahçe	Bergen, Norway
21:00 CET (UTC+1)	Helland (red card) 18'	Report	Aktürkoğlu 5'; Brown (yellow card) 14'; Talisca 36', 44', 65'	Stadium: Brann Stadion; Attendance: 15,620; Referee: Willy Delajod (France)

22 January 2026 7	Fenerbahçe (Turkey)	0–1	(England) Aston Villa	Istanbul, Turkey
20:45 TRT (UTC+3)	Nene (yellow card) 44'; Oosterwolde (yellow card) 45'; Müldür (yellow card) 79'; Škriniar (yellow card) 88'	Report	Sancho 25'; Digne (yellow card) 53'; Lindelöf (yellow card) 78'; Tielemans (yellow card) 88'; Bogarde (yellow card) 90+5'; Guessand (yellow card) 90+8'	Stadium: Şükrü Saracoğlu Stadium; Attendance: 41,414; Referee: Luis Godinho (Portugal)

29 January 2026 8	FCSB (Romania)	1–1	(Turkey) Fenerbahçe	Bucharest, Romania
22:00 EET (UTC+2)	Cisotti 71', (yellow card) 89'	Report	Yüksek 19', (yellow card) 28'; Ederson (yellow card) 78'; Fred (yellow card) 87'	Stadium: Arena Națională; Attendance: 27,752; Referee: Nenad Minaković (Serbia)

==== Knockout phase ====
===== Knockout phase play-offs =====
The draw for the knockout phase play-offs was held on 30 January 2026.

19 February 2026 First leg	Fenerbahçe (Turkey)	0–3	(England) Nottingham Forest	Istanbul, Turkey
20:45 TRT (UTC+3)	Škriniar (yellow card) 9'; Oosterwolde (yellow card) 69'; Söyüncü (yellow card) 78'; Fred (yellow card) 90+1'; Guendouzi (yellow card) 90+3'	Report	Murillo 21'; Igor Jesus 43'; Gibbs-White 50'	Stadium: Şükrü Saracoğlu Stadium; Attendance: 39,840; Referee: Sandro Schärer (Switzerland)

26 February 2026 Second leg	Nottingham Forest (England)	1–2 (4–2 agg.)	(Turkey) Fenerbahçe	West Bridgford, England
20:00 GMT (UTC+0)	Lucca (yellow card) 40'; Hudson-Odoi 68'	Report	Aktürkoğlu 22', 48' (pen.)	Stadium: City Ground; Attendance: 26,883; Referee: Maurizio Mariani (Italy)

== Statistics ==
Italic written players transferred/loaned out during the season.

=== Appearances and goals ===
No.	Pos	Nat	Player	Total		Süper Lig		Turkish Cup		Turkish Super Cup		Champions League		Europa League	
No.	Pos	Nat	Player	Apps	Goals	Apps	Goals	Apps	Goals	Apps	Goals	Apps	Goals	Apps	Goals
Goalkeepers
13	GK	(Turkey) TUR	Tarık Çetin	4	0	2	0	1	0	0	0	0	0	1	0
31	GK	(Brazil) BRA	Ederson	36	0	24	0	1	0	2	0	0	0	9	0
34	GK	(Turkey) TUR	Mert Günok	8	0	5	0	3	0	0	0	0	0	0	0
Defenders
3	DF	(England) ENG	Archie Brown	38	5	25	3	2	1	0	0	4	1	7	0
4	DF	(Turkey) TUR	Çağlar Söyüncü	19	0	11	0	2	0	2	0	1	0	3	0
14	DF	(Turkey) TUR	Yiğit Efe Demir	25	0	13	0	4	0	2	0	1	0	5	0
18	DF	(Turkey) TUR	Mert Müldür	41	1	24	1	5	0	2	0	4	0	6	0
22	DF	(Turkey) TUR	Levent Mercan	30	0	21	0	3	0	2	0	0	0	4	0
24	DF	(Netherlands) NED	Jayden Oosterwolde	47	1	31	0	2	0	2	1	4	0	8	0
27	DF	(Portugal) POR	Nélson Semedo	40	1	26	1	1	0	0	0	4	0	9	0
37	DF	(Slovakia) SVK	Milan Škriniar	40	2	24	2	2	0	2	0	4	0	8	0
67	DF	(Turkey) TUR	Kamil Efe Üregen	4	0	1	0	2	0	0	0	0	0	1	0
Midfielders
5	MF	(Turkey) TUR	İsmail Yüksek	47	2	30	1	5	0	2	0	2	0	8	1
6	MF	(France) FRA	Mattéo Guendouzi	22	2	15	1	4	0	1	1	0	0	2	0
7	MF	(Brazil) BRA	Fred	46	4	31	3	4	0	0	0	4	1	7	0
8	MF	(Turkey) TUR	Mert Hakan Yandaş	0	0	0	0	0	0	0	0	0	0	0	0
11	MF	(Mexico) MEX	Edson Álvarez	18	0	12	0	1	0	0	0	4	0	1	0
17	MF	(France) FRA	N'Golo Kanté	18	2	14	2	2	0	0	0	0	0	2	0
21	MF	(Spain) ESP	Marco Asensio	38	13	25	11	2	2	2	0	0	0	9	0
Forwards
9	FW	(Turkey) TUR	Kerem Aktürkoğlu	47	16	29	8	4	0	2	1	3	1	9	6
20	FW	(Netherlands) NED	Anthony Musaba	23	2	17	1	4	1	2	0	0	0	0	0
26	FW	(Guinea) GUI	Sidiki Cherif	16	3	12	2	2	1	0	0	0	0	2	0
45	FW	(Mali) MLI	Dorgeles Nene	39	11	25	10	3	1	1	0	0	0	10	0
54	FW	(Turkey) TUR	Alaettin Ekici	5	0	0	0	4	0	0	0	0	0	1	0
70	FW	(Turkey) TUR	Oğuz Aydın	39	0	21	0	5	0	2	0	3	0	8	0
94	FW	(Brazil) BRA	Talisca	45	27	30	19	3	3	1	0	3	1	8	4
Players transferred/loaned out during the season
1	GK	(Turkey) TUR	İrfan Can Eğribayat	6	0	3	0	0	0	0	0	3	0	0	0
6	DF	(Ghana) GHA	Alexander Djiku	1	0	1	0	0	0	0	0	0	0	0	0
10	FW	(Colombia) COL	Jhon Durán	21	5	10	3	1	0	2	1	4	1	4	0
17	MF	(Turkey) TUR	İrfan Kahveci	12	0	8	0	0	0	0	0	2	0	2	0
19	FW	(Morocco) MAR	Youssef En-Nesyri	27	8	16	7	0	0	0	0	4	1	7	0
20	FW	(Turkey) TUR	Cengiz Ünder	1	0	1	0	0	0	0	0	0	0	0	0
23	FW	(Turkey) TUR	Cenk Tosun	7	0	5	0	0	0	0	0	1	0	1	0
28	MF	(Turkey) TUR	Bartuğ Elmaz	8	0	5	0	1	0	1	0	1	0	0	0
34	MF	(Morocco) MAR	Sofyan Amrabat	6	1	2	0	0	0	0	0	4	1	0	0
40	GK	(Croatia) CRO	Dominik Livaković	2	0	1	0	0	0	0	0	1	0	0	0
50	DF	(Brazil) BRA	Rodrigo Becão	1	0	1	0	0	0	0	0	0	0	0	0
53	MF	(Poland) POL	Sebastian Szymański	26	2	14	1	2	0	1	0	4	0	5	1
95	DF	(Turkey) TUR	Yusuf Akçiçek	2	0	1	0	0	0	0	0	1	0	0	0
96	MF	(Turkey) TUR	Haydar Karataş	2	0	1	0	1	0	0	0	0	0	0	0

=== Goalscorers ===
Rank	No.	Pos	Nat	Player	Süper Lig	Turkish Cup	Turkish Super Cup	Champions League	Europa League	Total
1	94	FW	(Brazil)	Talisca	19	3	0	1	4	27
2	9	FW	(Turkey)	Kerem Aktürkoğlu	8	0	1	0	6	15
3	21	MF	(Spain)	Marco Asensio	11	2	0	0	0	13
4	45	FW	(Mali)	Dorgeles Nene	10	1	0	0	0	11
5	19	FW	(Morocco)	Youssef En-Nesyri	7	0	0	1	0	8
6	3	DF	(England)	Archie Brown	3	1	0	1	0	5
6	10	FW	(Colombia)	Jhon Durán	3	0	1	1	0	5
8	7	MF	(Brazil)	Fred	3	0	0	1	0	4
9	26	FW	(Guinea)	Sidiki Cherif	2	1	0	0	0	3
10	37	DF	(Slovakia)	Milan Škriniar	2	0	0	0	0	2
10	5	MF	(Turkey)	İsmail Yüksek	1	0	0	0	1	2
10	6	MF	(France)	Mattéo Guendouzi	1	0	1	0	0	2
10	20	FW	(Netherlands)	Anthony Musaba	1	1	0	0	0	2
10	17	MF	(France)	N'Golo Kanté	2	0	0	0	0	2
10	53	MF	(Poland)	Sebastian Szymański	1	0	0	0	1	2
16	18	DF	(Turkey)	Mert Müldür	1	0	0	0	0	1
16	24	DF	(Netherlands)	Jayden Oosterwolde	0	0	1	0	0	1
16	27	DF	(Portugal)	Nélson Semedo	1	0	0	0	0	1
16	34	MF	(Morocco)	Sofyan Amrabat	0	0	0	1	0	1
Own goals					1	0	0	0	0	1
Totals					77	9	4	6	12	108

=== Hat-tricks ===
Player	Against	Result	Date	Competition	Ref
(Brazil) Talisca	Brann	4–0 (A)	11 December 2025	Europa League	
(Mali) Dorgeles Nene	Gaziantep	4–1 (H)	17 March 2026	Süper Lig	
(Brazil) Talisca	Başakşehir	3–1 (H)	2 May 2026	Süper Lig	

(H) – Home; (A) – Away

=== Assists ===
Rank	No.	Pos	Nat	Player	Süper Lig	Turkish Cup	Turkish Super Cup	Champions League	Europa League	Total
1	21	MF	(Spain)	Marco Asensio	12	0	1	0	0	13
2	9	FW	(Turkey)	Kerem Aktürkoğlu	7	2	0	0	1	10
3	45	FW	(Mali)	Dorgeles Nene	6	1	0	0	2	9
4	3	DF	(England)	Archie Brown	3	1	0	2	1	7
5	20	FW	(Netherlands)	Anthony Musaba	4	0	2	0	0	6
6	22	DF	(Turkey)	Levent Mercan	3	0	1	0	1	5
6	94	FW	(Brazil)	Talisca	4	0	0	0	1	5
6	7	MF	(Brazil)	Fred	4	1	0	0	0	5
9	70	FW	(Turkey)	Oğuz Aydın	3	1	0	0	0	4
10	27	DF	(Portugal)	Nélson Semedo	3	0	0	0	0	3
10	5	MF	(Turkey)	İsmail Yüksek	2	0	0	0	1	3
10	10	FW	(Colombia)	Jhon Durán	3	0	0	0	0	3
13	18	DF	(Turkey)	Mert Müldür	2	0	0	0	0	2
13	53	MF	(Poland)	Sebastian Szymański	1	0	0	0	1	2
15	37	DF	(Slovakia)	Milan Škriniar	0	0	0	1	0	1
15	26	FW	(Guinea)	Sidiki Cherif	0	0	0	0	1	1
15	24	DF	(Netherlands)	Jayden Oosterwolde	0	0	0	0	1	1
15	4	DF	(Turkey)	Çağlar Söyüncü	1	0	0	0	0	1
15	11	MF	(Mexico)	Edson Álvarez	1	0	0	0	0	1
15	6	MF	(France)	Mattéo Guendouzi	1	0	0	0	0	1
15	19	FW	(Morocco)	Youssef En-Nesyri	0	0	0	1	0	1
15	23	FW	(Turkey)	Cenk Tosun	1	0	0	0	0	1
Totals					61	6	4	4	10	85

=== Clean sheets ===
Rank	No.	Pos	Nat	Player	Süper Lig	Turkish Cup	Turkish Super Cup	Champions League	Europa League	Total
1	31	GK	(Brazil)	Ederson	8	0	2	0	3	13
2	34	GK	(Turkey)	Mert Günok	1	2	0	0	0	3
3	1	GK	(Turkey)	İrfan Can Eğribayat	1	0	0	1	0	2
4	13	GK	(Turkey)	Tarık Çetin	1	0	0	0	0	1
5	40	GK	(Croatia)	Dominik Livaković	0	0	0	0	0	0
Totals					11	2	2	1	3	19

=== Disciplinary record ===
No.	Pos	Nat	Player	Süper Lig			Turkish Cup			Turkish Super Cup			Champions League			Europa League			Total		
No.	Pos	Nat	Player	Yellow card	(yellow card) (yellow-red card)	Red card	Yellow card	(yellow card) (yellow-red card)	Red card	Yellow card	(yellow card) (yellow-red card)	Red card	Yellow card	(yellow card) (yellow-red card)	Red card	Yellow card	(yellow card) (yellow-red card)	Red card	Yellow card	(yellow card) (yellow-red card)	Red card
1	GK	(Turkey)	İrfan Can Eğribayat																		
3	DF	(England)	Archie Brown	5			1									1			7		
4	DF	(Turkey)	Çağlar Söyüncü										1			1			2		
5	MF	(Turkey)	İsmail Yüksek	5												4			9		
6	MF	(France)	Mattéo Guendouzi	4			1			1						1			7		
7	MF	(Brazil)	Fred	3			1									5			9		
8	MF	(Turkey)	Mert Hakan Yandaş																		
9	FW	(Turkey)	Kerem Aktürkoğlu	3												1			4		
10	FW	(Colombia)	Jhon Durán	2									2			2		1	6		1
11	MF	(Mexico)	Edson Álvarez	4												2			6		
13	GK	(Turkey)	Tarık Çetin	1															1		
14	DF	(Turkey)	Yiğit Efe Demir	3			1									1			5		
17	MF	(France)	N'Golo Kanté	3															3		
17	MF	(Turkey)	İrfan Kahveci	1									1						2		
18	DF	(Turkey)	Mert Müldür	4			1			1						1			7		
19	FW	(Morocco)	Youssef En-Nesyri	1															1		
20	FW	(Netherlands)	Anthony Musaba	1															1		
21	MF	(Spain)	Marco Asensio	2															2		
22	DF	(Turkey)	Levent Mercan	1															1		
23	FW	(Turkey)	Cenk Tosun																		
24	DF	(Netherlands)	Jayden Oosterwolde	11	1					1			3			3			18	1	
26	FW	(Guinea)	Sidiki Cherif																		
27	DF	(Portugal)	Nélson Semedo	8			1									2			11		
28	MF	(Turkey)	Bartuğ Elmaz	1			1												2		
31	GK	(Brazil)	Ederson	6	1											1			7	1	
34	GK	(Turkey)	Mert Günok																		
34	MF	(Morocco)	Sofyan Amrabat										2						2		
37	DF	(Slovakia)	Milan Škriniar	6												4			10		
45	FW	(Mali)	Dorgeles Nene	3												1			4		
50	DF	(Brazil)	Rodrigo Becão																		
53	MF	(Poland)	Sebastian Szymański																		
70	FW	(Turkey)	Oğuz Aydın	2			1			1						1			5		
94	FW	(Brazil)	Talisca	2										1		1			3	1	
