= 2025 Turkish Super Cup final =

Final of the 52nd edition of Turkish Super Cup

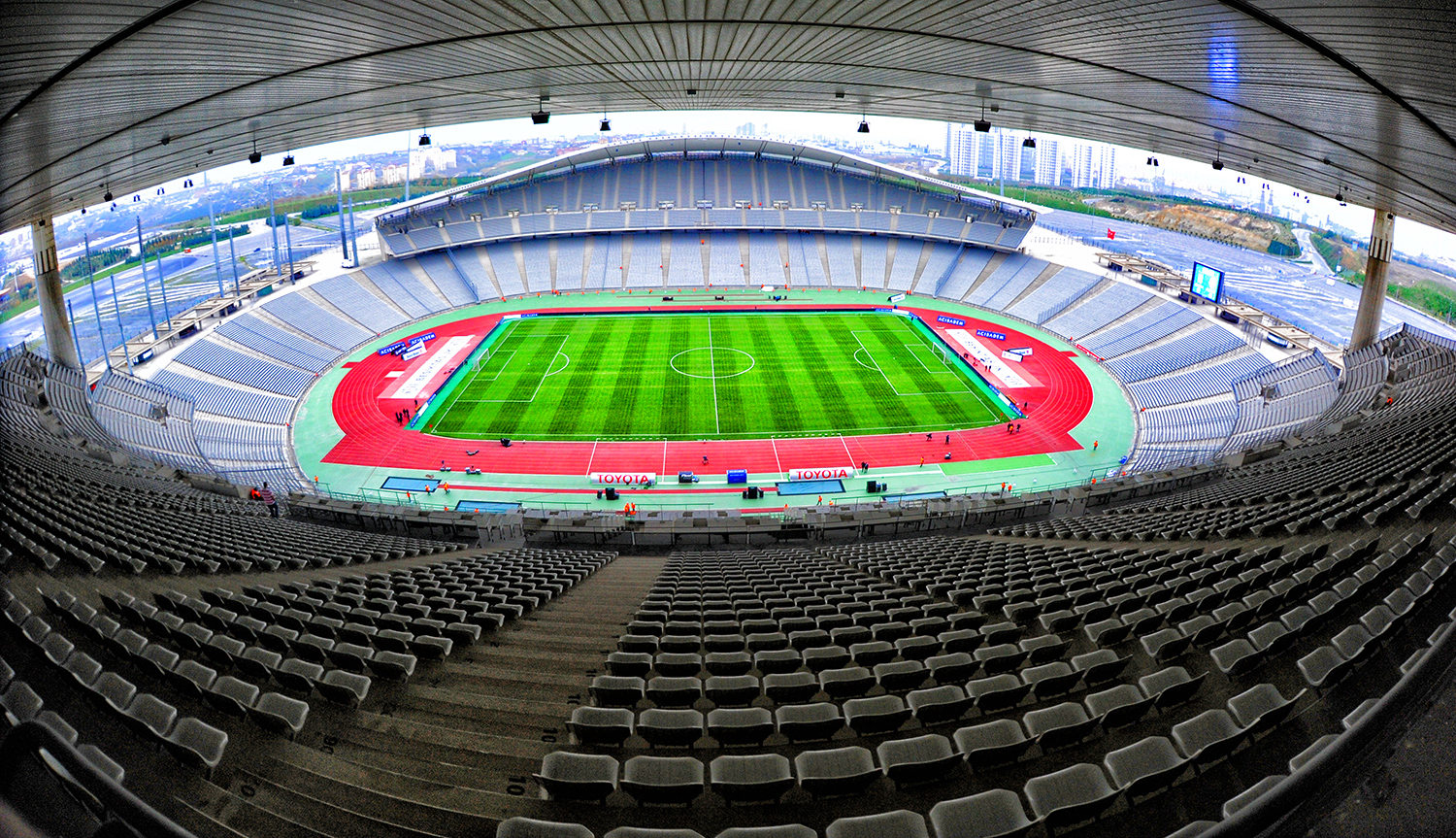
- The Atatürk Olympic Stadium in Istanbul hosted the final.
- Event: 2025 Turkish Super Cup
Galatasaray	Fenerbahçe
0	2
- Date: 10 January 2026
- Venue: Atatürk Olympic Stadium, Istanbul
- Man of the Match: Mattéo Guendouzi (Fenerbahçe)
- Referee: Halil Umut Meler
- Attendance: 58,397
- Weather: Light rain shower and windy 15 °C (59 °F); 67% humidity

The 2025 Turkish Super Cup final was the final match of the 2025 Turkish Super Cup, the 52nd edition of the annual Turkish football super cup competition. The match was played on 10 January 2026 at the Atatürk Olympic Stadium in Istanbul, Turkey. It was an Intercontinental Derby between the 2024–25 Süper Lig and 2024-25 Turkish Cup winners Galatasaray and the 2024–25 Süper Lig runners-up Fenerbahçe, the clubs meeting in the competition's decisive tie for the eighth time overall. Fenerbahçe won the match 2–0 for their first Turkish Super Cup title under the new format, and their tenth title overall.

== Teams ==
Team	Qualification for tournament	Previous finals appearances (bold indicates winners)
Galatasaray	2024–25 Süper Lig and 2024-25 Turkish Cup winners	27 (**1966**, **1969**, 1971, **1972**, 1973, 1976, **1982**, 1985, **1987**, **1988**, **1991**, **1993**, 1994, **1996**, **1997**, 1998, 2006, **2008**, **2012**, **2013**, 2014, **2015**, **2016**, 2018, **2019**, **2023**, 2024)
Fenerbahçe	2024–25 Süper Lig runners-up	19 (**1968**, 1970, **1973**, 1974, **1975**, 1978, 1979, 1983, **1984**, **1985**, 1989, **1990**, 1996, **2007**, **2009**, 2012, 2013, **2014**, 2023)

== Route to the final ==
Galatasaray		Round	Fenerbahçe	
Opponent	Result	2025 Turkish Super Cup	Opponent	Result
Trabzonspor	4–1	Semi-finals	Samsunspor	2–0

== Match ==
=== Summary ===
The match was played at a high tempo, with both sides creating chances, particularly in the first half. Fenerbahçe took the lead in the 28th minute when Mattéo Guendouzi scored with a low shot from outside the penalty area following a cleared cross. Galatasaray came close through Mauro Icardi and Davinson Sánchez but failed to convert their opportunities. Early in the second half, Fenerbahçe doubled their advantage as Jayden Oosterwolde finished from a corner kick in the 48th minute. Despite Galatasaray's attempts, including long-range efforts and attacking transitions, they were unable to score, while Fenerbahçe remained defensively solid.

Guendouzi's influential performance earned him the Man of the Match award, as selected by sports writers.

=== Details ===
10 January 2026
18:45 UTC+3

Galatasaray	0–2	Fenerbahçe
	Report	Guendouzi 28'; Oosterwolde 48'

Atatürk Olympic Stadium, Istanbul
Attendance: 58,397
Referee: Halil Umut Meler

**Galatasaray**	**Fenerbahçe**

GK	19	(Turkey) Günay Güvenç
RB	7	(Hungary) Roland Sallai	(yellow card) 33'	(substituted off) 87'
CB	6	(Colombia) Davinson Sánchez	(yellow card) 18'	(substituted off) 46'
CB	42	(Turkey) Abdülkerim Bardakcı
LB	17	(Turkey) Eren Elmalı		(substituted off) 87'
CM	99	(Gabon) Mario Lemina
CM	34	(Uruguay) Lucas Torreira		(substituted off) 72'
RW	10	(Germany) Leroy Sané	(yellow card) 41'	(substituted off) 79'
AM	11	(Turkey) Yunus Akgün
LW	53	(Turkey) Barış Alper Yılmaz
CF	9	(Argentina) Mauro Icardi (c)	(yellow card) 82'
Substitutes:
GK	1	(Turkey) Uğurcan Çakır
DF	23	(Turkey) Kaan Ayhan		(substituted on) 87'
DF	88	(Turkey) Kazımcan Karataş		(substituted on) 87'
DF	91	(Turkey) Arda Ünyay
MF	8	(Brazil) Gabriel Sara		(substituted on) 46'
MF	20	(Germany) İlkay Gündoğan		(substituted on) 72'
MF	30	(Austria) Yusuf Demir
MF	33	(Turkey) Gökdeniz Gürpüz
FW	21	(Turkey) Ahmed Kutucu		(substituted on) 79'
FW	62	(Turkey) Ada Yüzgeç
Manager:
(Turkey) Okan Buruk

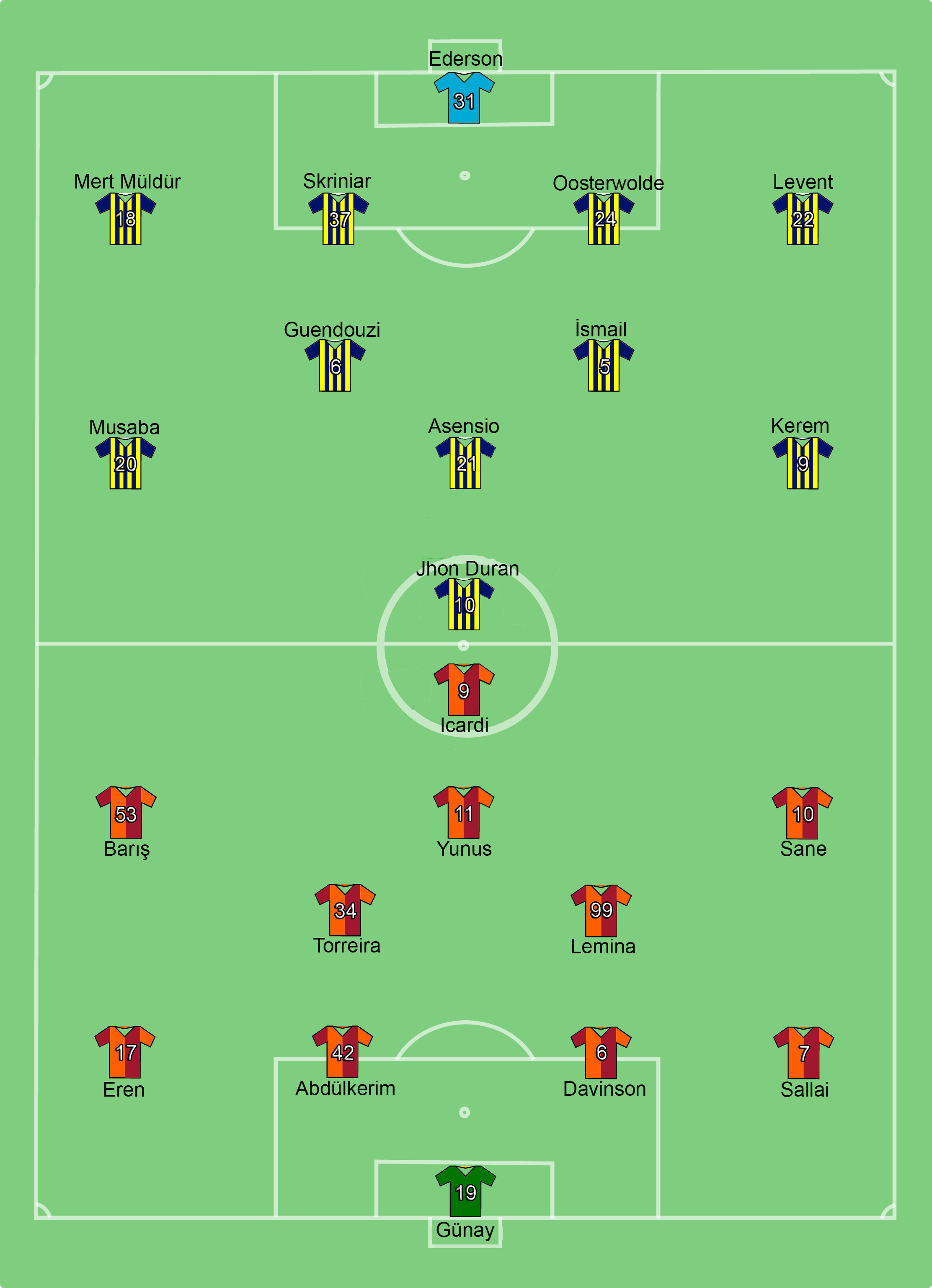

GK	31	(Brazil) Ederson
RB	18	(Turkey) Mert Müldür	(yellow card) 23'	(substituted off) 90'
CB	37	(Slovakia) Milan Škriniar (c)
CB	24	(Netherlands) Jayden Oosterwolde	(yellow card) 49'	(substituted off) 82'
LB	22	(Turkey) Levent Mercan
CM	5	(Turkey) İsmail Yüksek
CM	6	(France) Mattéo Guendouzi	(yellow card) 79'
RW	20	(Netherlands) Anthony Musaba		(substituted off) 69'
AM	21	(Spain) Marco Asensio
LW	9	(Turkey) Kerem Aktürkoğlu		(substituted off) 90'
CF	10	(Colombia) Jhon Durán		(substituted off) 69'
Substitutes:
GK	13	(Turkey) Tarık Çetin
GK	34	(Turkey) Mert Günok
DF	4	(Turkey) Çağlar Söyüncü		(substituted on) 82'
DF	14	(Turkey) Yiğit Efe Demir		(substituted on) 90'
DF	67	(Turkey) Kamil Efe Üregen
MF	28	(Turkey) Bartuğ Elmaz
MF	45	(Mali) Dorgeles Nene		(substituted on) 69'
MF	53	(Poland) Sebastian Szymański
MF	70	(Turkey) Oğuz Aydın		(substituted on) 90'
FW	94	(Brazil) Talisca		(substituted on) 69'
Manager:
(Germany) Domenico Tedesco

Man of the Match:
Mattéo Guendouzi (Fenerbahçe)

Assistant referees:
İbrahim Çağlar Uyarcan
Abdullah Bora Özkara
Fourth official:
Dördüncü hakem
Video assistant referee:
Ömer Faruk Turtay
Assistant video assistant referees:
Anıl Usta
Ali Şansalan

**Match rules**

- 90 minutes
- 30 minutes of extra time if necessary
- Penalty shoot-out if scores still level
- Ten named substitutes
- Maximum of five substitutions, with a sixth allowed in extra time (Note: Each team was given only three opportunities to make substitutions, with a fourth opportunity in extra time, excluding substitutions made at half-time, before the start of extra time and at half-time in extra time.)

== See also ==
- 2025–26 Fenerbahçe S.K. season
- 2025–26 Galatasaray S.K. season
