= Fenerbahçe S.K. U21 =

Fenerbahçe U21
- Full name: Fenerbahçe Spor Kulübü U21
- Nicknames: Sarı Kanaryalar (The Yellow Canaries); Sarı Lacivertliler (The Yellow-Navy Blues); Efsane (The Legend); Cumhuriyet (The Republic)
- Short name: FB; Fener
- Ground: Lefter Küçükandonyadis Training Facilities
- Capacity: 2,000
- President: Aziz Yıldırım
- Manager: Şenol Çorlu
- League: U21 Ligi
- Website: https://www.fenerbahce.org/
Home colours	Away colours	Third colours

Fenerbahçe Spor Kulübü U21, commonly known as Fenerbahçe Spor Kulübü B is a football club based in Istanbul, Turkey. It is the reserve team of Fenerbahçe S.K. and the club play in the U21 Ligi.

== Honours ==
Fenerbahçe S.K. U21 honours
Type	Competition	Titles	Seasons/Years
Domestic
Domestic	U21 Ligi	5	1997–98, 1998–99, 2000–01, 2013–14, 2016–17
Domestic	U21 Super Cup	1	2017
Defunct
Defunct	Istanbul Youth Championship	18	1913, 1914, 1924, 1927, 1933, 1934, 1935, 1936, 1946, 1949, 1954, 1955, 1956, 1963, 1970, 1975, 2000, 2006
Defunct	Istanbul Football League B	12	1916–17, 1920–21, 1922–23, 1930–31, 1932–33, 1934–35, 1935–36, 1936–37, 1938–39, 1940–41, 1944–45, 1946–42

== Players ==
=== Current squad ===
As of 18 August 2025

Note: Flags indicate national team as defined under FIFA eligibility rules; some limited exceptions apply. Players may hold more than one non-FIFA nationality.

No.	Pos.	Nation	Player
—	GK	TUR	Kuzey Sapaz
—	GK	TUR	Mehmt Efe Çelik
—	GK	TUR	Emir Yusuf Uygun
—	GK	TUR	Hulusi Efe Ceylan
—	GK	TUR	Rüzgar Onur Akgül
—	GK	TUR	Ali Yasir Caklı
—	DF	TUR	Muharrem Çizgili
—	DF	TUR	Boran Eligüzel
—	DF	TUR	Ömer Yiğit Tiryakigil
—	DF	TUR	Metehan Kurt
—	DF	TUR	Hasip Tahiroğlu
—	DF	TUR	Kamil Efe Üregen
—	DF	TUR	Ahmet Necat Aydın
—	DF	TUR	Can Bartu Çığır
—	DF	TUR	Mustafa Mert Danış
—	DF	TUR	Fırat Başkaya
—	DF	TUR	Altuğ Tınaz
—	DF	TUR	Uğur Şahin
—	DF	TUR	Ahmet Köse
—	DF	MKD	Blendi Ljachka
—	DF	TUR	Çağan Sarıdikmen
—	DF	TUR	Yağız Bedirhan Korkmaz
—	DF	TUR	Yağız Şen
—	MF	TUR	Mustafa Sezai Gülmez
—	MF	TUR	Ata Gür
—	MF	TUR	Efe Yılmaz

No.	Pos.	Nation	Player
—	MF	SEN	Abdou Aziz Fall
—	MF	SEN	Ibrahima Sory Sow
—	MF	TUR	Aziz Eren Balaban
—	MF	TUR	Samet Sargın
—	MF	TUR	Serkan Kök
—	MF	TUR	Abdullah Kara
—	MF	TUR	Yasir Boz
—	MF	TUR	Utku Karakaya
—	MF	TUR	Haydar Karataş
—	MF	TUR	Onur Kuşçu
—	MF	TUR	Emirhan Arkutçu
—	MF	TUR	Yiğit Evin
—	MF	TUR	Yunus Azrak
—	MF	TUR	Baran Yolaçan
—	MF	TUR	Efe Fettahoğlu
—	MF	TUR	Enis Budak
—	MF	TUR	Ali Öymen Özkar
—	MF	TUR	Emirhan Ateş
—	MF	TUR	Alaettin Ekici
—	FW	SEN	Amara Diouf
—	FW	MKD	Çağrı Fedai
—	FW	GER	Fabian Emre Ernst Müller
—	FW	TUR	Berkay İşcan
—	FW	TUR	Enes Şenyiğit
—	FW	TUR	Eren Sayar
—	FW	TUR	Kerem Gündüz
