= List of Turkish football transfers winter 2025–26 =

This is a list of Turkish football transfers for the 2025–26 winter transfer window. Only transfers featuring Süper Lig are listed.

== Süper Lig ==
Note: Flags indicate national team as has been defined under FIFA eligibility rules. Players may hold more than one non-FIFA nationality.

=== Alanyaspor ===
In:

No.	Pos.	Nation	Player

Out:

No.	Pos.	Nation	Player

=== Antalyaspor ===
In:

No.	Pos.	Nation	Player

Out:

No.	Pos.	Nation	Player

=== Beşiktaş ===
In:

No.	Pos.	Nation	Player
9	FW	KOR	Oh Hyeon-gyu (from (Belgium) Genk)
12	DF	CIV	Emmanuel Agbadou (from (England) Wolves)
15	MF	BEN	Junior Olaitan (from (Turkey) Göztepe)
23	MF	ALB	Kristjan Asllani (on loan from (Italy) Inter)
32	GK	COL	Devis Vásquez (on loan from (Italy) Roma)
58	DF	TUR	Yasin Özcan (on loan from (England) Aston Villa)
62	DF	PAN	Michael Amir Murillo (from (France) Marseille)

Out:

No.	Pos.	Nation	Player
1	GK	TUR	Mert Günok (to Fenerbahçe)
2	DF	NOR	Jonas Svensson (to (Norway) Rosenborg)
3	DF	BRA	Gabriel Paulista (released)
9	FW	ENG	Tammy Abraham (to (England) Aston Villa)
39	DF	CZE	David Jurásek (loan return to (Portugal) Benfica)
—	MF	TUR	Arda Kılıç (on loan to Karşıyaka, previously on loan at (Serbia) Novi Pazar)
—	MF	COL	Élan Ricardo (on loan to (Colombia) Deportes Tolima, previously on loan at (Brazil) Athletico Paranaense)
—	MF	TUR	Doruk Tuğrul (on loan to İnkılap FSK, previously on loan at Kırklarelispor)

=== Çaykur Rizespor ===
In:

No.	Pos.	Nation	Player
17	MF	SCO	Adedire Mebude (from (Belgium) Westerlo)
19	FW	HAI	Frantzdy Pierrot (on loan from (Greece) AEK Athens)
65	DF	TUR	Emir Ortakaya (from (Turkey) Fenerbahçe)

Out:

No.	Pos.	Nation	Player
15	FW	CZE	Václav Jurečka (released)
—	MF	FIN	Janne-Pekka Laine (released)

=== Eyüpspor ===
In:

No.	Pos.	Nation	Player
23	FW	FRA	Lenny Pintor (from (Austria) LASK)

Out:

No.	Pos.	Nation	Player
10	MF	TUR	Kerem Demirbay (to Kasımpaşa)
18	DF	BIH	Nihad Mujakić (loan return to (Serbia) Partizan, later loaned to Gaziantep)
—	MF	UKR	Taras Stepanenko (To (Ukraine) Kolos Kovalivka)
70	FW	ROU	Denis Drăguș (loan return to Trabzonspor, later loaned to Gaziantep)

=== Fatih Karagümrük ===
In:

No.	Pos.	Nation	Player
4	DF	ITA	Davide Biraschi (on loan from (Italy) Frosinone)
6	MF	TUR	Bartuğ Elmaz (on loan from Fenerbahçe)

Out:

No.	Pos.	Nation	Player

=== Fenerbahçe ===
In:

No.	Pos.	Nation	Player
6	MF	FRA	Mattéo Guendouzi (from (Italy) Lazio)
17	MF	FRA	N'Golo Kanté (from (Saudi Arabia) Al-Ittihad)
20	MF	NED	Anthony Musaba (from (Turkey) Samsunspor)
26	FW	FRA	Sidiki Cherif (on loan from (France) Angers)
34	GK	TUR	Mert Günok (from (Turkey) Beşiktaş)

Out:

No.	Pos.	Nation	Player
1	GK	TUR	İrfan Can Eğribayat (on loan to Samsunspor)
17	MF	TUR	İrfan Can Kahveci (on loan to Kasımpaşa)
23	FW	TUR	Cenk Tosun (to Kasımpaşa)
28	MF	TUR	Bartuğ Elmaz (on loan to Fatih Karagümrük)
50	DF	BRA	Rodrigo Becão (on loan to Kasımpaşa)
53	MF	POL	Sebastian Szymański (to (France) Rennes)
96	MF	TUR	Haydar Karataş (on loan to Sakaryaspor)

=== Galatasaray ===
In:

No.	Pos.	Nation	Player
22	MF	COL	Yáser Asprilla (on loan from (Spain) Girona)
27	MF	ARG	Can Armando Güner (from (Germany) Mönchengladbach U19)
74	MF	GNB	Renato Nhaga (from (Portugal) Casa Pia)
77	MF	NED	Noa Lang (on loan from (Italy) Napoli)
93	DF	FRA	Sacha Boey (on loan from (Germany) Bayern Munich)

Out:

No.	Pos.	Nation	Player
18	MF	TUR	Berkan Kutlu (to Konyaspor)

=== Gaziantep ===
In:

No.	Pos.	Nation	Player
5	DF	BIH	Nihad Mujakić (on loan from (Serbia) Partizan, previously on loan at Eyüpspor)
8	MF	NGA	Victor Gidado (from (Slovenia) Bravo)
17	MF	GAM	Karamba Gassama (from (Albania) Dinamo City)
70	FW	ROU	Denis Drăguș (on loan from Trabzonspor, previously on loan at Eyüpspor)

Out:

No.	Pos.	Nation	Player
5	MF	SEN	Badou Ndiaye (released)
27	MF	BIH	Enver Kulašin (on loan to Sarıyer)

=== Gençlerbirliği ===
In:

No.	Pos.	Nation	Player

Out:

No.	Pos.	Nation	Player
90	DF	TUR	Sinan Osmanoğlu (released)

=== Göztepe ===
In:

No.	Pos.	Nation	Player
8	MF	SUI	Alexis Antunes (from (Switzerland) Servette)
14	FW	BRA	Guilherme Luiz (from (Brazil) Ceará)
19	FW	BRA	Jeh (from (Brazil) Ponte Preta)
33	GK	TUR	Mehmet Şamil Öztürk (from Kayserispor)

Out:

No.	Pos.	Nation	Player

=== İstanbul Başakşehir ===
In:

No.	Pos.	Nation	Player

Out:

No.	Pos.	Nation	Player
23	MF	TUR	Deniz Türüç (to Konyaspor)
—	MF	BIH	Hamza Ljukovac (on loan to (Slovenia) Mura, previously on loan at (Czech Republic) Teplice)

=== Kasımpaşa ===
In:

No.	Pos.	Nation	Player
22	DF	TUR	Kamil Çörekçi (from Hatayspor)
23	FW	TUR	Cenk Tosun (from Fenerbahçe)
26	MF	TUR	Kerem Demirbay (from Eyüpspor)
50	DF	BRA	Rodrigo Becão (on loan from Fenerbahçe)
71	MF	TUR	İrfan Can Kahveci (on loan from Fenerbahçe)

Out:

No.	Pos.	Nation	Player

=== Kayserispor ===
In:

No.	Pos.	Nation	Player

Out:

No.	Pos.	Nation	Player
39	GK	TUR	Mehmet Şamil Öztürk (to Göztepe)

=== Kocaelispor ===
In:

No.	Pos.	Nation	Player

Out:

No.	Pos.	Nation	Player

=== Konyaspor ===
In:

No.	Pos.	Nation	Player
9	MF	TUR	Deniz Türüç (from İstanbul Başakşehir)
18	MF	TUR	Berkan Kutlu (from Galatasaray)
24	DF	TUR	Arif Boşluk (on loan from Trabzonspor)
32	MF	NOR	Sander Svendsen (from (Norway) Viking)

Out:

No.	Pos.	Nation	Player

=== Samsunspor ===
In:

No.	Pos.	Nation	Player
47	FW	CIV	Jaurès Assoumou (from (France) Troyes)
71	GK	TUR	İrfan Can Eğribayat (on loan from Fenerbahçe)
—	MF	NED	Elayis Tavşan (from (Italy) Hellas Verona, previously on loan at (Italy) Reggiana)

Out:

No.	Pos.	Nation	Player
7	MF	NED	Anthony Musaba (to Fenerbahçe)
—	FW	SWE	Richie Omorowa (on loan to (Cyprus) Olympiakos Nicosia, previously on loan at (Sweden) Degerfors)

=== Trabzonspor ===
In:

No.	Pos.	Nation	Player
14	DF	NOR	Mathias Fjørtoft Løvik (from (Italy) Parma)
27	DF	NGA	Chibuike Nwaiwu (from (Austria) Wolfsberg)

Out:

No.	Pos.	Nation	Player
14	FW	UKR	Danylo Sikan (to (Belgium) Anderlecht)
29	DF	TUR	Serdar Saatçı (on loan to (United Arab Emirates) Al-Nasr)
77	DF	TUR	Arif Boşluk (on loan to Konyaspor)
—	FW	ROU	Denis Drăguș (on loan to Gaziantep, previously on loan at Eyüpspor)

== See also ==
- 2025–26 Süper Lig
