= Sidiki =

Sidiki may refer to

== Given name ==
- Sidiki Abass
- Sidiki Camara (disambiguation), several persons
- Sidiki Cherif (born 2006), French U21 and Fenerbahçe footballer who plays as a striker
- Sidiki Bakaba (born 1949), actor and scenario writer from Côte d'Ivoire
- Sidiki Diabaté (born 1992), Malian kora player, singer, and music producer
- Sidiki Diarra (1952-2014), Burkinabé footballer
- Sidiki Kaba (born 1950), keeper of the seals and the Minister of Justice of Senegal
- Sidiki Maiga

== Surname ==
- Abraruddin Ahmed Sidiki
- Mamadou Sidiki Diabaté (born 1982), Mandé kora player and jali from Mali
- Ruslan Sidiki (born 1988), Russian anarchist

== See also ==
- Siddik
- Siddiki
