= Engin Can Biterge =

Turkish footballer (born 2007)

Personal information
- Date of birth: 22 January 2007 (age 19)
- Place of birth: Istanbul, Türkiye
- Height: 1.94 m (6 ft 4 in)
- Position: Goalkeeper

Team information
- Current team: Adana 01

Youth career
- 2022-2025: Fenerbahçe Academy

Senior career*
Years	Team	Apps	(Gls)
2025–2026	Fenerbahçe	0	(0)
2026–	Adana 01	0	(0)

International career
2025–	Turkey U18	1	(0)
- * Club domestic league appearances and goals as of 06:57, 13 December 2025 (UTC)

Engin Can Biterge (born 22 January 2007) is a Turkish professional footballer who plays as a goalkeeper for TFF 2. Lig club Adana 01. He has dual Turkish and Bulgarian citizenship.

== Club career ==
Biterge is a product of the youth academies of the Turkish clubs Bayrampaşa Altıntepsispor and Fenerbahçe Academy.

In 2025–2026 season, he started to be part of senior team.

== International career ==
Çetin is a youth international for Turkey, having represented the U18s.

== Honours ==
Fenerbahçe

- Turkish Super Cup: 2025
