= Yiğit Efe Demir =

Turkish footballer (born 2004)

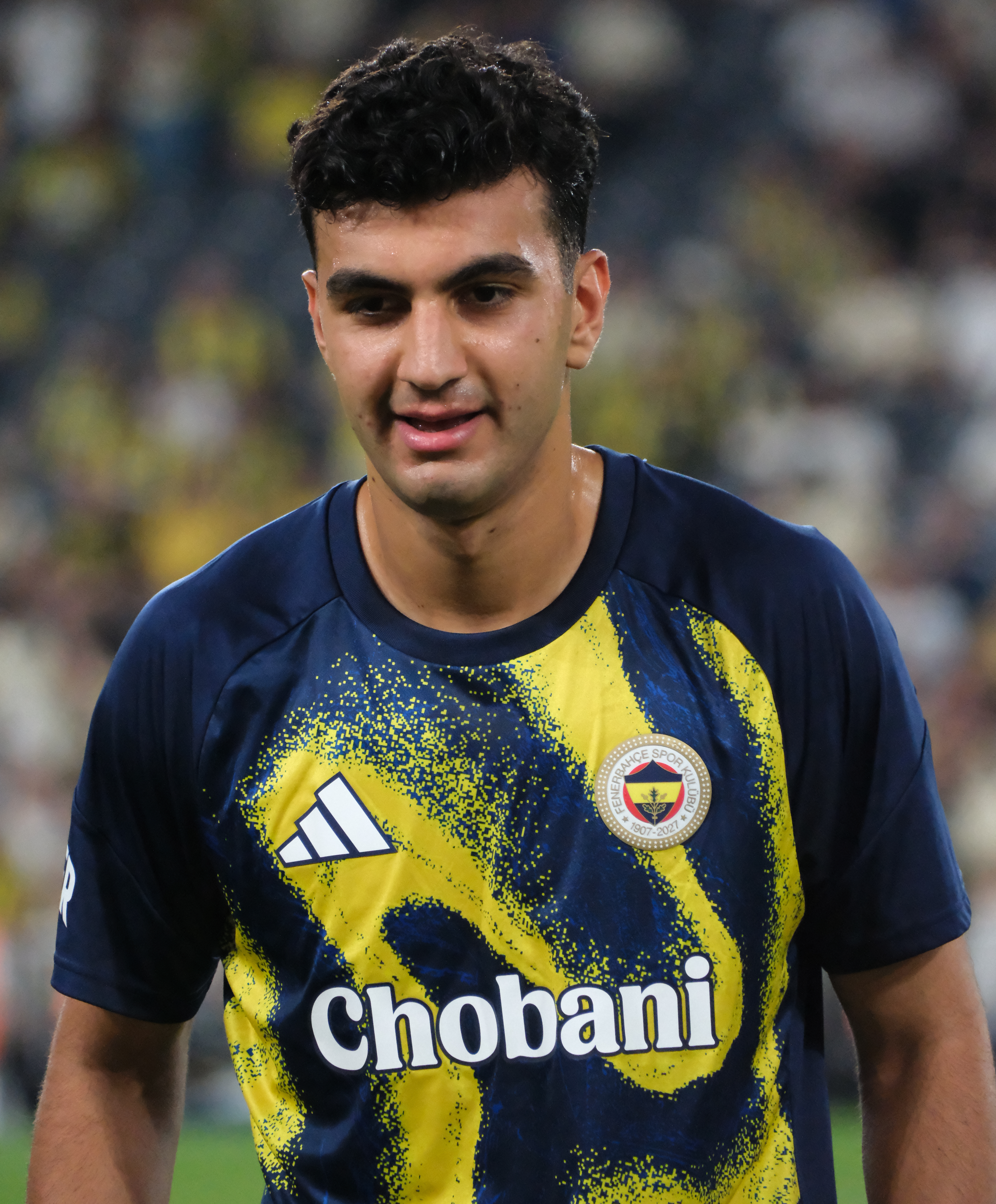
- Demir in 2026

Personal information
- Full name: Yiğit Efe Demir
- Date of birth: 2 August 2004 (age 22)
- Place of birth: Şişli, Turkey
- Height: 1.93 m (6 ft 4 in)
- Position: Centre back

Team information
- Current team: Fenerbahçe
- Number: 14

Youth career
- 2013–2017: Hürriyet Gücü SK
- 2017–2020: Altınordu
- 2020–2023: Fenerbahçe

Senior career*
Years	Team	Apps	(Gls)
2023–	Fenerbahçe	13	(0)
2023–2024	→ Gençlerbirliği (loan)	13	(0)
2024–2025	→ Fatih Karagümrük (loan)	37	(0)

International career^{‡}
2022	Turkey U19	1	(0)
2024–	Turkey U21	2	(0)
- * Club domestic league appearances and goals as of 31 October 2026 ‡ National team caps and goals as of 15 November 2024

Yiğit Efe Demir (born 2 August 2004) is a Turkish professional footballer who plays as a centre back for Süper Lig club Fenerbahçe.

== Career ==
=== Early years ===
He started his career at Hürriyet Gücü SK from Istanbul between 2013 and 2017, playing alongside Kerem Küçükkaya who is a central defender. They played for Altınordu Academy between the 2017–2020 seasons.

Then they transferred to Fenerbahçe Academy, where they played between the 2020–2023 seasons. On 3 August 2022, they signed their first professional contract with Fenerbahçe.

==== Gençlerbirliği (loan, 2023–2024) ====
He played on loan at Gençlerbirliği in the 2023–2024 season, played 13 matches in 2023–24 TFF 1. Lig season and 4 matches in 2023–24 Turkish Cup.

==== Fatih Karagümrük (loan, 2024–2025) ====
He played on loan at Fatih Karagümrük in the 2024–2025 season, played 36 matches in 2024–25 TFF 1. Lig season and one match in Süper Lig play-off .

=== Fenerbahçe (2025–present) ===
On 9 July 2025, he signed four-year contract extension with Fenerbahçe.

On 12 August 2025, he made his professional debut with Fenerbahçe in a 2025–26 UEFA Champions League third qualifying round second match against Feyenoord, as a late substitute in 5-2 home victory.

On 27 November 2026, he made his debut as a starter with the team, in a UEFA Europa League match against Ferencváros.

As a Turkish professional football player, he made his Süper Lig debut on 6 December 2025, as a starter in a 1-1 away tie against Başakşehir.

== International career ==
Demir is a youth international for Turkey, having represented 1 match for the U19s in 2022 and having represented 2 matches for the U21s since 2024. In March 2026 while he was in the Turkey U21s camp, Demir received an emergency call-up to the Turkey senior squad for the training squad against Romania.

== Style of play ==
Demir known for his composure and strong game reading, his potential shines in workrate and defensive traits. He is right-footed and began playing for center-back, although he also plays as a right-back position if needed.

== Career statistics ==
As of matches played 31 October 2026

Appearances and goals by club, season and competition
Club	Season	League			Turkish Cup		Continental		Other		Total	
Club	Season	Division	Apps	Goals	Apps	Goals	Apps	Goals	Apps	Goals	Apps	Goals
Fenerbahçe U19	2020–21	U19 Elit A Ligi	12	1	—		—		—		12	1
Fenerbahçe U19	2021–22	U19 Elit A Ligi	19	0	—		—		—		19	0
Fenerbahçe U19	2022–23	U19 Elit A Ligi	13	3	—		—		4 (Note: Appearances in Rezerv Lig)	0	17	3
Fenerbahçe U19	Total		44	4	0	0	0	0	4	0	48	4
Gençlerbirliği (loan)	2023–24	TFF 1. Lig	13	0	4	0	—		—		17	0
Fatih Karagümrük (loan)	2024–25	TFF 1. Lig	37	0	0	0	—		—		37	0
Fenerbahçe	2025–26	Süper Lig	12	0	4	0	5 (Note: One appearance in UEFA Champions League, four appearances in UEFA Europa League)	0	2 (Note: Appearance in Turkish Super Cup)	0	23	0
Fenerbahçe	2026–27	Süper Lig	1	0	0	0	0	0	0	0	1	0
Fenerbahçe	Total		13	0	4	0	5	0	2	0	24	0
Career total			106	4	8	0	5	0	6	0	126	4

== Honours ==
=== Club ===
Fenerbahçe

- Turkish Cup: 2022–23
- Turkish Super Cup: 2025

Fatih Karagümrük

- TFF 1. Lig: 2024–25 TFF 1. Lig Süper Lig play-off winner
