= Siddiki =

Siddiki is a surname. Notable people with the surname include:

- Aboubakary Siddiki (born 1972), Cameroonian politician
- Jafar Iqbal Siddiki (fl. 2008), Bangladeshi politician
- M Allama Siddiki (born 1965), Bangladeshi diplomat
- Nasir Siddiki (born 1953), Canadian evangelist, author, and business consultant
- Ousama Siddiki (born 1998), Moroccan footballer

== See also ==
- Siddik
- Sidiki
