= Parti Republicain du Cameroun =

Political party in Cameroon

The Republican Party of Cameroon is an official Cameroonian Political Party following the decision Number 00000087/D/MINATD/DAP/SDE/SPP on 15 April 2013.

Georges Gilbert Baongla serves as the party's President. He was arrested on 29 May 2019, leading his party to file a letter of protest demanding his release. Morgan Palmer was named the vice-president of the party when Baongla was in prison in 2019.
