= Haydar Karataş =

Turkish footballer (born 2007)

Personal information
- Date of birth: 13 March 2007 (age 19)
- Place of birth: Turgutlu, Turkey
- Position: Winger

Team information
- Current team: Kocaelispor
- Number: 19

Youth career
- 2016–2022: Altınordu
- 2022-2025: Fenerbahçe

Senior career*
Years	Team	Apps	(Gls)
2025–2026	Fenerbahçe	1	(0)
2026	Sakaryaspor	7	(0)
2026–	Kocaelispor	0	(0)

International career^{‡}
2024	Turkey U17	3	(0)
2024	Turkey U18	2	(0)
2026–	Turkey U19	2	(0)
- * Club domestic league appearances and goals as of 18 October 2026 ‡ National team caps and goals as of 14 January 2026

Haydar Karataş (born 13 March 2007) is a Turkish professional footballer who plays as a winger for Süper Lig club Kocaelispor.

== Club career ==
Karataş is a product of the youth academies of the Turkish clubs Altınordu and Fenerbahçe. On 15 December 2025, he signed his first professional contract with Fenerbahçe. On 20 December 2025, he made his senior and professional debut with Fenerbahçe in a 3–0 Süper Lig over Eyüpspor.

On 25 January 2026, he transferred to TFF 1. Lig side Sakaryaspor until the end of season.

== International career ==
Karataş is a youth international for Turkey. He played for the Turkey U18s in a friendly tournament in September 2025.

== Career statistics ==
As of matches played 5 February 2026

Appearances and goals by club, season and competition
Club	Season	League			Turkish Cup		Continental		Other		Total	
Club	Season	Division	Apps	Goals	Apps	Goals	Apps	Goals	Apps	Goals	Apps	Goals
Fenerbahçe U19	2025–26	U19 Elit A Ligi	10	3	—		—		—		10	3
Fenerbahçe	2025–26	Süper Lig	1	0	1	0	0	0	0	0	2	0
Sakaryaspor (loan)	2025–26	TFF 1. Lig	0	0	0	0	—		—		0	0
Career total			11	3	1	0	1	0	0	0	12	3

== Honours ==
Fenerbahçe

- Turkish Super Cup: 2025
