= Kamil Efe Üregen =

Turkish footballer (born 2005)

Personal information
- Date of birth: 9 April 2008 (age 18)
- Place of birth: Seyhan, Türkiye
- Height: 1.94 m (6 ft 4 in)
- Position: Centre-back

Team information
- Current team: Serikspor (on loan from Fenerbahçe)
- Number: 67

Youth career
- 2017–2022: Adana Kanaryaspor
- 2022–: Fenerbahçe

Senior career*
Years	Team	Apps	(Gls)
2025–	Fenerbahçe	1	(0)
2026–	→ Serikspor (loan)	4	(0)
- * Club domestic league appearances and goals as of 14 November 2026

Kamil Efe Üregen (born 9 April 2008) is a Turkish professional footballer who plays as a centre-back for TFF 2. Lig club Serikspor on loan from Fenerbahçe.

== Club career ==
Üregen is a product of the youth academies of the Turkish clubs Adana Kanaryaspor and Fenerbahçe.

He made his senior and professional debut with Fenerbahçe as a substitute in a 4–0 UEFA Europa League win over SK Brann on 11 December 2025. On 17 December 2025, he signed his first professional contract with Fenerbahçe.

On 5 February 2026, he made his Turkish Cup debut as a starter against Erzurumspor in a 3-1 home win.

== Career statistics ==
As of matches played 13 September 2026

Appearances and goals by club, season and competition
Club	Season	League			Turkish Cup		Continental		Other		Total	
Club	Season	Division	Apps	Goals	Apps	Goals	Apps	Goals	Apps	Goals	Apps	Goals
Fenerbahçe U19	2025–26	U19 Elit A Ligi	7	0	—		—		—		7	0
Fenerbahçe	2025–26	Süper Lig	0	0	2	0	1 (Note: Appearance(s) in UEFA Europa League)	0	0	0	3	0
Serikspor (loan)	2026–27	TFF 2. Lig	1	0	0	0	—		0	0	1	0
Career total			8	0	2	0	1	0	0	0	11	0

== Honours ==
Fenerbahçe

- Turkish Super Cup: 2025
