= Siddik =

Siddik or Sıddık (Turkish spelling) is a given name and a surname.

- Siddik Hadj-Ahmed, Algerian writer
- Mehmet Sıddık İstemi, Turkish footballer
- Sıddık Sami Onar, Turkish academic
- Rasul Siddik, American jazz trumpeter

== See also ==
- Sidiki
- Siddiki
- Sidik (disambiguation)
