= Rodrigo Becão =

Brazilian footballer (born 1996)

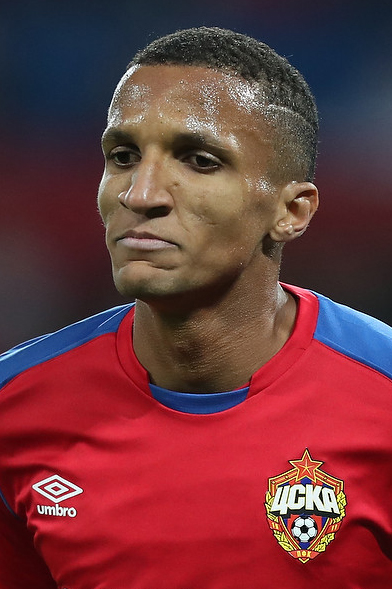
- Becão with CSKA Moscow in 2018

Personal information
- Full name: Rodrigo Nascimento França
- Date of birth: 19 January 1996 (age 30)
- Place of birth: Salvador, Brazil
- Height: 1.91 m (6 ft 3 in)
- Positions: Centre-back; right-back

Team information
- Current team: Rodina Moscow (on loan from Fenerbahçe)
- Number: 50

Youth career
- 2009–2016: Bahia

Senior career*
Years	Team	Apps	(Gls)
2015–2019	Bahia	18	(1)
2018–2019	→ CSKA Moscow (loan)	28	(0)
2019–2023	Udinese	127	(6)
2023–	Fenerbahçe	28	(1)
2026	→ Kasımpaşa (loan)	13	(0)
2026–	→ Rodina Moscow (loan)	6	(0)
- * Club domestic league appearances and goals as of 22 November 2026

Rodrigo Nascimento França, known as Rodrigo Becão (born 19 January 1996) is a Brazilian professional footballer who plays as a centre-back or right-back for Russian Premier League club Rodina Moscow on loan from Fenerbahçe.

== Career ==
=== Bahia ===
Becão made his career debut for Bahia on 28 November 2015 in a Campeonato Brasileiro Série B game against Atlético Goianiense.

On 10 March 2016, he made his Copa do Nordeste debut as a starter against Juazeirense in a 1-2 away win. On 29 January 2017, he made his Campeonato Baiano debut against Jacuipense in a 0-0 tie.

On 13 June 2017, he made his Campeonato Brasileiro Série A debut with the team against Grêmio.

On 12 April 2018, he made his Copa Sudamericana debut as a starter against Bolivian club Blooming in an away 1-0 loss.

==== Loan to CSKA Moscow ====
On 4 July 2018, Becão joined the Russian Premier League club CSKA Moscow on loan for the 2018–19 season. He made his first appearance for CSKA on 27 July 2018, in their 2018 Russian Super Cup victory over Lokomotiv Moscow.

On 31 July 2018, he made his Russian Premier League debut in a 0-0 tie game against Samara.

On 19 September 2018, he made his UEFA Champions League debut with 2–2 away tie against Viktoria Plzeň.

=== Udinese ===
On 6 July 2019, Rodrigo Becão signed to Italian Serie A side Udinese for €1.6 million.

On 18 August 2019, he made his debut with the team against Südtirol in a 3-1 Coppa Italia win. On 25 August 2019, Becão scored the winning goal on his Serie A debut in a 1–0 victory over A.C. Milan at the Dacia Arena.

=== Fenerbahçe ===
On 20 July 2023, Turkish Süper Lig side Fenerbahçe announced the signing of Becão on a five-year contract for €8.31 million.

On 10 August 2023, he scored his first goal in his debut in UEFA Conference League against NK Maribor at the Şükrü Saracoğlu Stadium; Fenerbahçe won 3–1.

On 13 August 2023, he made his Süper Lig debut against Gaziantep at the Şükrü Saracoğlu Stadium; Fenerbahçe won 2–1.

On 15 December 2024, he ruptured the anterior cruciate ligament (ACL) in his right knee in the Süper Lig match against Başakşehir and was expected to be out for about seven months.

On 23 November 2025, after a long time ruptured the anterior cruciate ligament (ACL) medical rehabilitation, he played as a substitute in the Süper Lig match against Çaykur Rizespor.

==== Loan to Kasımpaşa ====
On 17 January 2026, he loaned to Kasımpaşa until the end of season.

==== Loan to Rodina Moscow ====
On 9 Septembery 2026, he loaned to Russian Premier League new side, 2025–26 Russian First League champion Rodina Moscow until the end of season.

== Career statistics ==
As of match played 22 November 2026

Appearances and goals by club, season and competition
Club	Season	League			State league		National cup (Note: Includes Copa do Brasil, Russian Cup, Coppa Italia, Turkish Cup)		Continental		Other		Total	
Club	Season	Division	Apps	Goals	Apps	Goals	Apps	Goals	Apps	Goals	Apps	Goals	Apps	Goals
Bahia	2015	Série B	1	0	0	0	0	0	–		0	0	1	0
Bahia	2016	Série B	0	0	0	0	0	0	–		2	0	2	0
Bahia	2017	Série A	8	0	6 (Note: Appearance in Campeonato Baiano)	0	0	0	–		1 (Note: Appearance in Copa do Nordeste)	0	15	0
Bahia	2018	Série A	1	0	2	1	0	0	1 (Note: Appearance in Copa Sudamericana)	0	1	0	5	1
Bahia	Total		10	0	8	1	0	0	1	0	4	0	23	1
CSKA Moscow (loan)	2018–19	Russian Premier League	28	0	–		1	0	6 (Note: Appearances in UEFA Champions League)	0	1 (Note: Appearance in Russian Super Cup)	0	36	0
Udinese	2019–20	Serie A	29	1	–		1	0	–		–		30	1
Udinese	2020–21	Serie A	35	1	–		1	0	–		–		36	1
Udinese	2021–22	Serie A	35	2	–		1	0	–		–		36	2
Udinese	2022–23	Serie A	28	2	–		0	0	–		–		28	2
Udinese	Total		127	6	0	0	3	0	0	0	0	0	130	6
Fenerbahçe	2023–24	Süper Lig	16	0	–		0	0	6 (Note: Appearances in UEFA Europa Conference League)	1	–		22	1
Fenerbahçe	2024–25	Süper Lig	11	1	–		0	0	4 (Note: Appearances in UEFA Europa League)	0	–		15	1
Fenerbahçe	2025–26	Süper Lig	1	0	–		0	0	0	0	–		1	0
Fenerbahçe	Total		28	1	0	0	0	0	10	1	0	0	38	2
Kasımpaşa (loan)	2025–26	Süper Lig	13	0	–		0	0	–		–		13	0
Rodina Moscow (loan)	2026–27	Russian Premier League	6	0	–		1	0	–		–		7	0
Career total			211	7	8	1	5	0	17	1	6	0	247	9

== Honours ==
Bahia

- Copa do Nordeste: 2017
- Campeonato Baiano: 2018

CSKA Moscow

- Russian Super Cup: 2018

Fenerbahçe

- Turkish Super Cup: 2025
