= Jayden Oosterwolde =

Dutch footballer (born 2001)

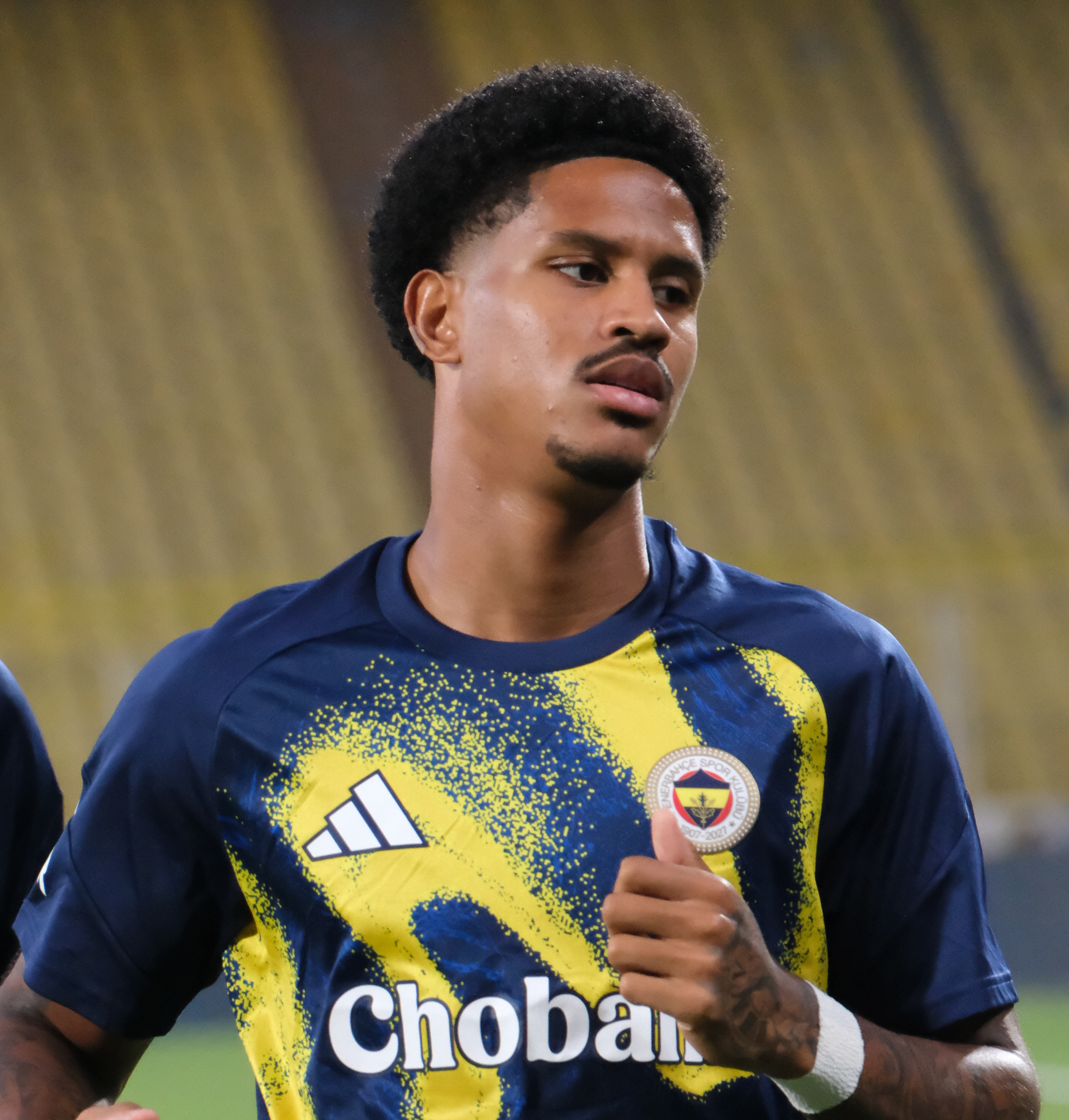
- Oosterwolde playing for Fenerbahçe in 2026

Personal information
- Full name: Jayden Quinn Oosterwolde
- Date of birth: 26 April 2001 (age 25)
- Place of birth: Zwolle, Netherlands
- Height: 1.89 m (6 ft 2 in)
- Positions: Left-back; centre-back

Team information
- Current team: Fenerbahçe
- Number: 24

Youth career
- –2012: ZAC
- 2012–2020: Twente

Senior career*
Years	Team	Apps	(Gls)
2020–2022	Twente	40	(1)
2022	→ Parma (loan)	5	(0)
2022–2023	Parma	18	(1)
2023–	Fenerbahçe	65	(0)
- * Club domestic league appearances and goals as of 11 April 2026

Jayden Quinn Oosterwolde (born 26 April 2001) is a Dutch professional footballer who plays as a left-back or centre-back for Süper Lig club Fenerbahçe.

== Club career ==
=== Early career ===
Oosterwolde began his career with local club ZAC before moving to the Twente youth academy in 2012.

=== Twente ===
In June 2020, he signed his first contract with the Twente/Heracles Academy, the shared U21 side of the two clubs, after emerging from the Twente football academy. He was supposed to be part of the U21 football team in the 2020–21 season, but after trials at both Heracles and Twente, both clubs wanted to sign him. He eventually chose Twente, where he signed a three-year contract in July 2020 and joined their first team.

On 12 September 2020, he made his professional debut as a starter in a home match against Fortuna Sittard. He provided the assist from which Queensy Menig scored the 1–0 goal as Twente won 2–0.

=== Parma ===
On 31 January 2022, Oosterwolde signed with Serie B side Parma in Italy on loan with an obligation to buy. On 5 February 2022, he made his debut with the team against Benevento in Serie B.

On 30 June 2022, Twente officially announced his permanent joining to Parma. On 19 October 2022, he made his Coppa Italia debut as a starter in left back position against Bari, Parma won 1–0 at home.

=== Fenerbahçe ===
==== 2022–23 season ====
On 30 January 2023, Oosterwolde signed a four-and-a-half-year deal with Turkish side Fenerbahçe for a reported fee of €6 million.

He made his continental debut in a 1–0 UEFA Europa League win over Sevilla on 16 March 2023. On 24 August 2023, he scored his first goal with the team against his childhood club Twente in UEFA Europa Conference League match, Fenerbahçe won 5–1.

==== 2023–24 season ====
2023–24 Süper Lig season was his breakthrough season, during which he started to enter the radar of Europe's elite teams. He appeared in 27 Süper Lig matches, 13 continental matches with two goals, and also played 3 Turkish Cup matches.

==== 2024–25 season ====
On 20 October 2024, he ruptured the anterior cruciate ligament (ACL) in his left knee in a Süper Lig match against Samsunspor and was expected to be out for about seven months. In April 2025, he started to train with the team.

==== 2025–26 season ====
On 8 July 2025, Oosterwolde reneweded his contract with the club until the end of 2027–28 season. On 10 January 2026, he scored in the intercontinental derby against Galatasaray in a 2–0 Turkish Super Cup final victory.

On 8 March 2026, he made his 100th appearance in all competitions for Fenerbahçe against Samsunspor in a 3–2 league home win.

== Personal life ==
Born in the Netherlands, Oosterwolde is of Surinamese and Indonesian descent.

== Career statistics ==
As of matches played 5 August 2026

Appearances and goals by club, season and competition
Club	Season	League			National cup (Note: Includes KNVB Cup, Coppa Italia, Turkish Cup)		Europe		Other		Total	
Club	Season	Division	Apps	Goals	Apps	Goals	Apps	Goals	Apps	Goals	Apps	Goals
Twente	2020–21	Eredivisie	26	1	0	0	—		—		26	1
Twente	2021–22	Eredivisie	14	0	1	0	—		—		15	0
Twente	Total		40	1	1	0	0	0	0	0	41	1
Parma (loan)	2021–22	Serie B	5	0	0	0	—		—		5	0
Parma	2022–23	Serie B	18	1	1	0	—		—		19	1
Parma	Total		23	1	1	0	0	0	0	0	24	1
Fenerbahçe	2022–23	Süper Lig	3	0	1	0	1 (Note: Appearance in UEFA Europa League)	0	—		5	0
Fenerbahçe	2023–24	Süper Lig	27	0	3	0	13 (Note: Appearances in UEFA Conference League)	2	0	0	43	2
Fenerbahçe	2024–25	Süper Lig	8	0	0	0	6 (Note: Four appearances in UEFA Champions League, two appearances in UEFA Europa League)	0	—		14	0
Fenerbahçe	2025–26	Süper Lig	27	0	2	0	12 (Note: Four appearances in UEFA Champions League, eight appearances in UEFA Europa League)	0	2 (Note: Appearances in Turkish Super Cup)	1	43	1
Fenerbahçe	2026–27	Süper Lig	0	0	0	0	3 (Note: Appearance in UEFA Champions League)	0	0	0	3	0
Fenerbahçe	Total		65	0	6	0	35	2	2	1	108	3
Career total			128	2	8	0	35	2	2	1	172	5

== Honours ==
Fenerbahçe

- Turkish Cup: 2022–23
- Turkish Super Cup: 2025
