= İsmail Yüksek =

Turkish footballer (born 1999)

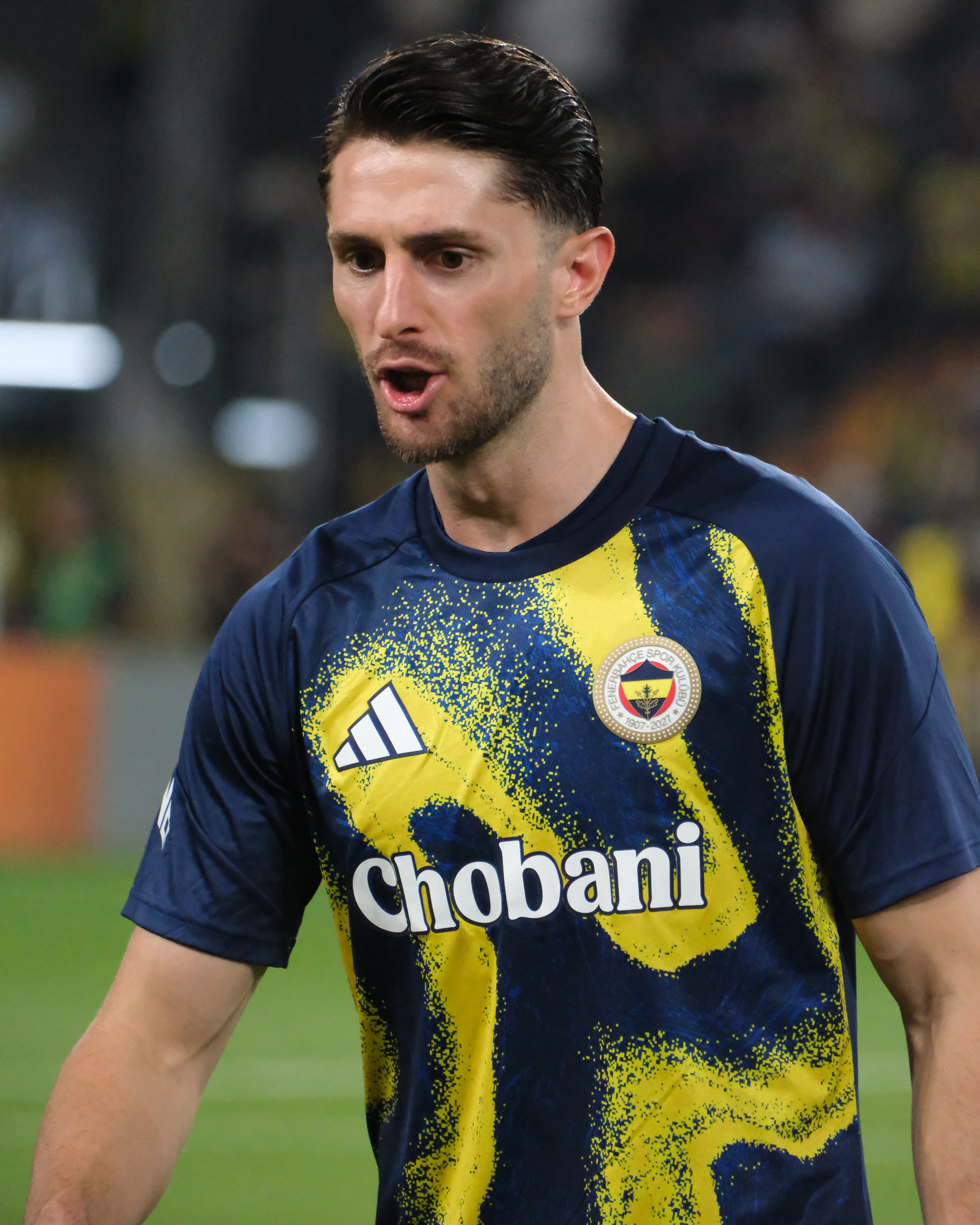
- Yüksek playing for Fenerbahçe in 2026

Personal information
- Full name: İsmail Yüksek
- Date of birth: 26 January 1999 (age 27)
- Place of birth: İznik, Turkey
- Height: 1.83 m (6 ft 0 in)
- Position: Midfielder

Team information
- Current team: Fenerbahçe
- Number: 5

Youth career
- 2011–2012: Bursaspor
- 2012–2015: Bursa Merinosspor
- 2015–2016: Yeşil Bursa
- 2016–2017: Yıldırım Belediyespor
- 2017–2018: Bursa Yıldırımspor

Senior career*
Years	Team	Apps	(Gls)
2018–2020	Gölcükspor	49	(9)
2020–	Fenerbahçe	108	(1)
2020–2021	→ Balıkesirspor (loan)	11	(1)
2021	→ Adana Demirspor (loan)	7	(1)
2021–2022	→ Bursaspor (loan)	29	(3)

International career^{‡}
2022–	Turkey	40	(1)
- * Club domestic league appearances and goals as of 8 November 2026 ‡ National team caps and goals as of 15 November 2026

İsmail Yüksek (born 26 January 1999) is a Turkish professional footballer who plays as a midfielder for Süper Lig side Fenerbahçe and the Turkey national team.

== Club career ==
=== Youth and Gölcükspor ===
Yüksek began his youth career with hometown club Bursaspor and also played in youth level with Bursa Merinosspor, Yeşil Bursa, Yıldırım Belediyespor and Bursa Yıldırımspor. He started his professional career with Gölcükspor and played two successful season with them.

=== Fenerbahçe ===
Yüksek signed a five-year contract with Fenerbahçe on 2 May 2020.

==== Loans ====
On 5 October 2020, Yüksek joined Balıkesirspor on loan.

He returned to Fenerbahçe on 12 January 2021. Yüksek made his professional debut with Fenerbahçe in a 3–1 Süper Lig win over MKE Ankaragücü on 18 January 2021.

On 1 February 2021, he joined Adana Demirspor on loan in the TFF First League for the second half of the 2020–21 season.

He went on loan to Bursaspor for the 2021–22 season.

==== 2022–23 season ====
After return to Fenerbahçe, Yüksek made a very strong start to the 2022–23 season with coach Jorge Jesus, made good use of his first 11 chances and called to the national team. On 6 October, he was selected man of the match by supporters votes for his performance in the 2022–23 UEFA Europa League Group B third week AEK Larnaca match.

On 20 January 2023, Fenerbahçe announced to sign new contract with him until May 2027.

==== 2023–24 season ====
In his second season as a starter in the team, he made his top performance with new coach and team's local legend İsmail Kartal, he consolidate his place with Fenerbahçe and international team. He changed his shirt number from 80 to 5.

==== 2024–25 season ====
On 20 December 2024, he made his 100th appearances in all competitions for Fenerbahçe against Eyüpspor in a 1-1 Süper Lig away tie.

On 28 March 2025, he extended his contract with Fenerbahçe until May 2028.

==== 2025–26 season ====
On 2 November 2025, he scored his first league goal for Fenerbahçe against Beşiktaş in a 2-3 Süper Lig away derby victory.

== International career ==
Without any youth international experience, Yüksek made his international debut against Luxembourg on 22 September 2022, coming on as an 81st minute substitute and he scored his first goal six minutes later. He wasn't selected to the Turkey youth national teams and directly played for senior level.

On 12 October 2023, he has become the first player to record 15+ duels and 10+ possessions won in a single Euro 2024 qualifier game, winning 16 duels and recovering 12 possessions against Croatia.

On 2 June 2026, Yüksek was selected in the 26-man squad for the 2026 FIFA World Cup.

== Style of play ==
Yüksek is an all-round, box-to-box midfielder. He is known for his vision, technique, aggressive tackling, athletic attributes, stamina, and powerful, accurate long range shooting with his right foot. A versatile hard-working player, he is capable of playing center and defensive midfield roles, while adapting himself to several different formations, but usually operated in the centre of the pitch.

== Career statistics ==
=== Club ===
As of match played 8 November 2026

Appearances and goals by club, season and competition
Club	Season	League			Turkish Cup		Europe		Other		Total	
Club	Season	Division	Apps	Goals	Apps	Goals	Apps	Goals	Apps	Goals	Apps	Goals
Gölcükspor	2018–19	TFF Third League	22	1	1	0	—		—		23	1
Gölcükspor	2019–20	TFF Third League	27	8	0	0	—		—		27	8
Gölcükspor	Total		49	9	1	0	0	0	0	0	50	9
Fenerbahçe	2020–21	Süper Lig	1	0	0	0	—		—		1	0
Fenerbahçe	2022–23	Süper Lig	19	0	4	0	9 (Note: Two appearances in UEFA Champions League, seven appearances and one goal in UEFA Europa League)	1	—		32	1
Fenerbahçe	2023–24	Süper Lig	30	0	3	0	14 (Note: Appearances in UEFA Conference League)	1	0	0	47	1
Fenerbahçe	2024–25	Süper Lig	20	0	1	0	9 (Note: Three appearances in UEFA Champions League, six appearances in UEFA Europa League)	0	—		30	0
Fenerbahçe	2025–26	Süper Lig	30	1	5	0	10 (Note: Two appearances in UEFA Champions League, eight appearances and one goal in UEFA Europa League)	1	2 (Note: Appearances in Turkish Super Cup)	0	47	2
Fenerbahçe	2026–27	Süper Lig	8	0	0	0	7 (Note: Appearance(s) in UEFA Champions League)	0	0	0	15	0
Fenerbahçe	Total		108	1	13	0	49	3	2	0	172	4
Balıkesirspor (loan)	2020–21	TFF First League	11	1	1	0	—		—		12	1
Adana Demirspor (loan)	2020–21	TFF First League	7	0	0	0	—		—		7	0
Bursaspor (loan)	2021–22	TFF First League	29	3	1	0	—		—		30	3
Career total			204	14	16	0	49	3	2	0	271	17

=== International ===
As of match played 15 November 2026

Appearances and goals by national team and year
National team	Year	Apps	Goals
Turkey	2022	4	1
Turkey	2023	8	0
Turkey	2024	9 (Note: Three appearances in UEFA Euro 2024)	0
Turkey	2025	8	0
Turkey	2026	11 (Note: Two appearances in 2026 FIFA World Cup)	0
Total		40	1

Scores and results show Turkey's goal tally first, score column indicates score after each Yüksek goal.

International goals by date, venue, opponent, score, result and competition
No.	Date	Venue	Opponent	Score	Result	Competition
1	22 September 2022	Başakşehir Fatih Terim Stadium, Istanbul, Turkey	Luxembourg	3–3	3–3	2022–23 UEFA Nations League C

== Honours ==
Adana Demirspor

- TFF 1. Lig: 2020–21

Fenerbahçe

- Turkish Cup: 2022–23
- Turkish Super Cup: 2025
