= Alaettin Ekici =

Turkish footballer (born 2007)

Personal information
- Date of birth: 1 January 2009 (age 17)
- Place of birth: Sapanca, Turkey
- Position: Winger

Team information
- Current team: Fenerbahçe
- Number: 54

Youth career
- 2018–2019: Sapanca Akademispor
- 2019-2025: Fenerbahçe

Senior career*
Years	Team	Apps	(Gls)
2025–	Fenerbahçe	0	(0)

International career^{‡}
2024	Turkey U16	1	(0)
- * Club domestic league appearances and goals as of 23:55, 21 December 2025 (UTC) ‡ National team caps and goals as of 23:55, 21 December 2025 (UTC)

Alaettin Ekici (born 1 January 2009) is a Turkish professional footballer who plays as a winger for Süper Lig club Fenerbahçe.

== Club career ==
Ekici is a product of the youth academies of the Turkish clubs Sapanca Akademispor and Fenerbahçe. On 20 November 2025, he signed his first professional contract with Fenerbahçe. He made his senior and professional debut with Fenerbahçe as a substitute in a 2–1 Turkish Cup loss to Beşiktaş on 23 December 2025.

On 26 February 2026, he made his continental debut in his career in a 2-1 UEFA Europa League away won against Nottingham Forest as a second-half substitute.

== International career ==
Ekici is a youth international for Turkey. He was first called up to the Turkey U16s for a friendly tournament in October 2024.

== Career statistics ==
As of matches played 4 March 2026

Appearances and goals by club, season and competition
Club	Season	League			Turkish Cup		Continental		Other		Total	
Club	Season	Division	Apps	Goals	Apps	Goals	Apps	Goals	Apps	Goals	Apps	Goals
Fenerbahçe U19	2025–26	U19 Elit A Ligi	5	5	—		—		—		5	5
Fenerbahçe	2025–26	Süper Lig	0	0	4	0	1 (Note: Appearances in UEFA Europa League)	0	0	0	5	0
Career total			5	5	4	0	1	0	0	0	10	5
