= Aboubakary Siddiki =

Cameroonian politician (born 1972)

- Born: June 10, 1972 (age 53); Maroua, Far North Region, Cameroon
- Occupations: Politician, Businessman, Author
- Political party: Patriotic Movement for the Salvation of Cameroon (PMSC)

Aboubakary Siddiki (born 10 June 1972 in Maroua, located in the Far North Region of Cameroon), is a Cameroonian president of the opposition party Patriotic Movement for the Salvation of Cameroon (PMSC).

== Career ==
Siddiki is the President of the Patriotic Movement for the Salvation of Cameroon (PMSC), a political party he founded in 2013. He served as a municipal councilor in the rural commune of Maroua from 2002 to 2007. Siddiki has been an outspoken critic of the Cameroonian government.

== Political persecution and imprisonment ==
In 2014, Siddiki became a victim of political persecution and repression, leading to his arrest and imprisonment for five years. His detention was widely condemned by human rights organizations, and his popularity continued to grow during this period. Following his release in 2019, he gained strong support from various regions in Cameroon, particularly the Grand Nord, where over 51% of the population backed his presidential aspirations
