= Allan Godói =

Brazilian footballer (born 1993)

Personal information
- Full name: Allan Godói Santos
- Date of birth: 4 April 1993 (age 33)
- Place of birth: São Gonçalo, Brazil
- Height: 1.87 m (6 ft 2 in)
- Position: Centre-back

Team information
- Current team: Göztepe
- Number: 3

Youth career
- Juventude

Senior career*
Years	Team	Apps	(Gls)
2015–2017	São Gonçalo	13	(1)
2017	FC Rio de Janeiro	12	(1)
2018	Bolamense	9	(0)
2018–2019	Maricá	12	(0)
2019–2020	Volta Redonda	13	(1)
2020	Madureira	2	(0)
2020–2023	Sampaio Corrêa	58	(2)
2023–2025	Operário Ferroviário	50	(1)
2025–	Göztepe	27	(0)
- * Club domestic league appearances and goals as of 10 June 2026 ‡ National team caps and goals as of 13:52, 15 April 2026 (UTC)

Allan Godói Santos (born 4 April 1993) is a Brazilian professional footballer who plays as a centre-back for club Göztepe.

== Career ==
A youth product of Juventude, Godói began his senior career with São Gonçalo in 2015, and followed that up with stints at FC Rio de Janeiro in 2017 and Bolamense in 2018. In 2019, he joined Maricá for a season, before joining Volta Redonda and Madureira in the Campeonato Brasileiro Série C. From 2020 to 2023, he played with Sampaio Corrêa where he won 2 Campeonato Maranhense tournaments. He was accused of max-fixing in 2022 and had his contract rescinded with Sampaio Corrêa in May 2023. On 11 April 2023, he transferred to Operário Ferroviário despite his suspension. He was absolved of his case in June 2023 and allowed to play again. He helped Operário Ferroviário earn promotion to the Campeonato Brasileiro Série B and won the 2025 Campeonato Paranaense.

On 6 June 2025, Godói transferred to Süper Lig club Göztepe.

== Honours ==
Sampaio Corrêa

- Campeonato Maranhense: 2021, 2022

Operário Ferroviário

- Campeonato Paranaense: 2025
