= Sidiki Camara (disambiguation) =

Sidiki Camara (born 2002), Swiss professional footballer

It may also refer to:

- Aboubacar Sidiki Camara or Titi Camara, Guinean footballer
- Aboubacar Sidiki Camara (politician), Guinean politician
