= Sidiki Cherif =

Guinean footballer (born 2006)

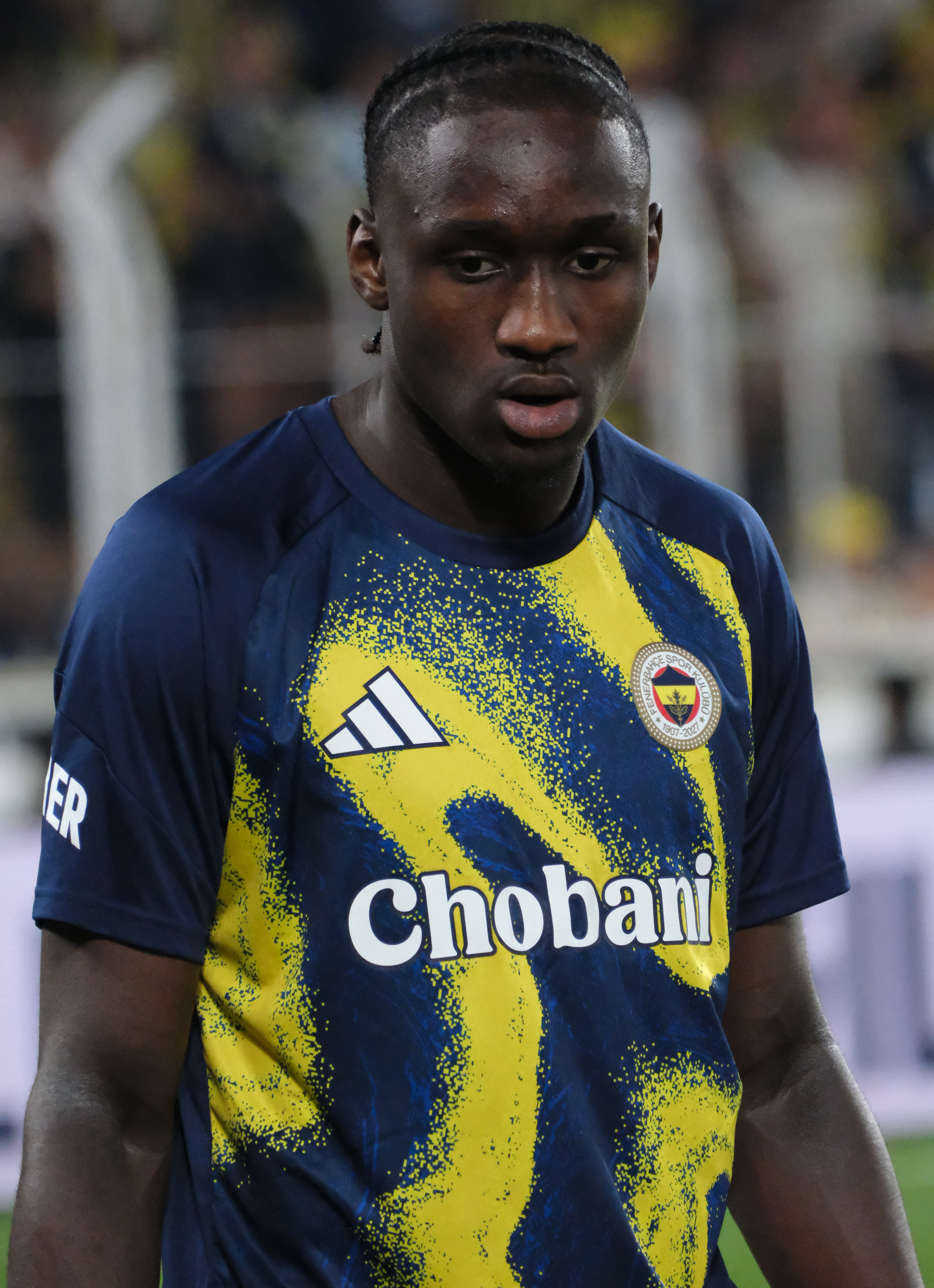
- Cherif in 2026

Personal information
- Full name: Sidiki Chérif
- Date of birth: 15 December 2006 (age 19)
- Place of birth: Dubréka, Guinea
- Height: 1.88 m (6 ft 2 in)
- Position: Striker

Team information
- Current team: Coventry City
- Number: 49

Youth career
- 2013–2018: Bayard-Saumur
- 2018–2019: Olympique Saumur
- 2019–2023: Angers

Senior career*
Years	Team	Apps	(Gls)
2023–2024	Angers II	12	(2)
2023–2026	Angers	33	(4)
2026	→ Fenerbahçe (loan)	12	(2)
2026	Fenerbahçe	0	(0)
2026–	Coventry City	3	(1)
- * Club domestic league appearances and goals as of 02:09, 12 October 2026 (UTC)

Sidiki Cherif (born 15 December 2006) is a Guinean professional footballer who plays as a striker for Premier League club Coventry City.

== Club career ==
=== Angers ===
Born in Conakry, Cherif arrived in France at the age of 5. He is a youth product of Bayard Saumur, Olympique Saumur and Angers, where he impressed with the under-19.

In July 2023, he signed his first professional contract with Angers. Cherif made his professional debut with Angers in a 1–0 Ligue 2 away loss to Laval on 9 January 2024 at the age of 16 years and 7 months.

On 18 August 2024, he made his Ligue 1 debut as a starter against Lens in a 1–0 home loss. On 18 October 2025, he scored his first professional goal against Monaco in a 1–1 Ligue 1 match. Although his progress was temporarily hindered by recurring injuries—including a thigh operation in late 2024 followed by a relapse in early 2025—he successfully established himself as a starter during the 2025–2026 Ligue 1 season. Operating as a powerful left-winger, he recorded four goals in 19 appearances during the first half of the season, scoring against major clubs such as Monaco, Marseille and Nantes.

=== Fenerbahçe ===
On 1 February 2026, Chérif finalized a move to Fenerbahçe in a deal valued at approximately €25 million, equaling Angers SCO's record transfer fee established by the 2019 sale of Jeff Reine-Adélaïde. The agreement consists of an initial €4 million loan fee, an €18 million mandatory purchase obligation effective in the summer of 2026, and €3 million in bonuses. The forward has signed a contract keeping him at the club until 2030.

On 9 February 2026, he made his debut in a 3–1 Süper Lig home victory against Gençlerbirliği. On 19 February, he made his continental debut in his professional career in UEFA Europa League match against Nottingham Forest.

On 1 March 2026, he scored his first goal for the team in 2–2 Süper Lig away match against Antalyaspor. On 4 March, three days after his first goal with the team, he scored again in his Turkish Cup debut against Gaziantep in 4–0 away victory. He scored the winning goal in the 90+5th minute on 8 March, securing a 3–2 Süper Lig victory for Fenerbahçe against Samsunspor, was selected by L'Equipe for their Team of the Week, composed of French footballers playing abroad.

=== Coventry City ===
On 18 August 2026, Cherif joined Premier League club Coventry City on a long-term deal.

== International career ==
Born in Guinea, Cherif was called to the France under-16 team during the 2021–22 season, but he did not play in either match.

Cherif's successful start to his Fenerbahçe career caught the attention of France under-21 team coach Gérald Baticle, and he was called up to the squad for the 2027 UEFA European Under-21 Championship qualifying group matches against Luxembourg under-21 team and Iceland under-21 team, on 19 March 2026.

== Career statistics ==
As of matches played 6 November 2026

Appearances and goals by club, season and competition
Club	Season	League			National cup (Note: Includes Coupe Gambardella, Coupe de France, Turkish Cup, FA Cup)		League cup (Note: Includes EFL Cup)		Europe		Other		Total	
Club	Season	Division	Apps	Goals	Apps	Goals	Apps	Goals	Apps	Goals	Apps	Goals	Apps	Goals
Angers II	2023–24	National 2	12	2	2	0	—		—		3 (Note: Appearance(s) in National U19 - Grp. C)	2	17	4
Angers II	2024–25	National 3	0	0	0	0	—		—		1	0	1	0
Angers II	Total		12	2	2	0	—		—		4	2	18	4
Angers	2023–24	Ligue 2	7	0	2	0	—		—		—		9	0
Angers	2024–25	Ligue 1	7	0	0	0	—		—		—		7	0
Angers	2025–26	Ligue 1	19	4	1	0	—		—		—		20	4
Angers	Total		33	4	3	0	—		—		—		36	4
Fenerbahçe (loan)	2025–26	Süper Lig	12	2	2	1	—		2 (Note: Appearances in UEFA Europa League)	0	—		16	3
Fenerbahçe	2026–27	Süper Lig	0	0	—		—		1 (Note: Appearance in UEFA Champions League)	0	—		1	0
Coventry City	2026–27	Premier League	6	1	0	0	2	0	—		—		8	1
Career total			63	9	7	1	2	0	3	0	4	2	79	12
