= Fenerbahçe S.K. Academy =

Fenerbahçe Futbol Akademisi
- Full name: Fenerbahçe Spor Kulübü Futbol Akademisi
- Nicknames: Sarı Kanaryalar (The Yellow Canaries); Sarı Lacivertliler (The Yellow-Navy Blues); Efsane (The Legend); Cumhuriyet (The Republic)
- Founded: 3 May 1907; 119 years ago
- Ground: Lefter Küçükandonyadis Facilities
- Capacity: 2,000
- President: Aziz Yıldırım
- League: Academy Leagues
Home colours	Away colours	Third colours

Fenerbahçe Spor Kulübü Futbol Akademisi is the collective organisation for the youth team of Fenerbahçe from Turkey. The academy has squads for ten age groups from ages 10 to 19.

== Players ==
=== Current squad ===
As of 1 September 2026

Note: Flags indicate national team as defined under FIFA eligibility rules; some limited exceptions apply. Players may hold more than one non-FIFA nationality.

No.	Pos.	Nation	Player
2	DF	TUR	Çağan Sarıdikmen
3	DF	TUR	Üveys Yasir Satık
4	DF	TUR	Doruk Özsaraç
5	MF	TUR	Efe Yılmaz
6	MF	TUR	Ata Gür
7	MF	TUR	Onur Kuşçu
8	MF	TUR	Serhan Kök
9	FW	TUR	Selahattin Sevim
10	MF	TUR	Adnan Efe Fettahoğlu
11	MF	TUR	Baran Yolaçan
14	MF	MKD	Blendi Ljachka
15	DF	TUR	Ömer Yiğit Tiryakigil
18	FW	TUR	Emin Eren Sayar
17	MF	TUR	Alaettin Ekici
18	DF	TUR	Ali Demirbilek
19	DF	TUR	Ercüment Sancaklı

No.	Pos.	Nation	Player
30	MF	GHA	Daniel Asante Amoh
—	MF	TUR	Yasir Boz
—	MF	SEN	Abdou Aziz Fall
—	GK	TUR	Kuzey Sapaz
—	GK	TUR	Rüzgar Onur Akgül
—	FW	TUR	Çağrı Hakan Balta
—	DF	TUR	Yağız Bedirhan Korkmaz
—	DF	TUR	Mustafa Mert Danış
—	GK	TUR	Sadullah Kabakuşak
—	MF	TUR	Emirhan Ateş
—	GK	TUR	Yağız Ege Şalcı
—	GK	TUR	Ali Yasir Caklı
—	GK	TUR	Hulusi Efe Ceylan
—	MF	TUR	Güner Ekici
—	DF	TUR	Gökmen Özdemir

== See also ==
- Fenerbahçe S.K.
