= Yasir Boz =

Turkish footballer (born 2007)

Personal information
- Date of birth: 3 October 2007 (age 19)
- Place of birth: Düzce, Turkey
- Position: Midfielder

Team information
- Current team: Fenerbahçe
- Number: 83

Youth career
- 2016–2019: Düzce 1907 Spor
- 2019–: Fenerbahçe

International career^{‡}
Years	Team	Apps	(Gls)
2022	Turkey U15	2	(1)
2023–	Turkey U16	3	(0)
- ‡ National team caps and goals as of 17:04, 22 June 2023 (UTC)

Yasir Boz (born 3 October 2007) is a Turkish professional footballer who plays as a midfielder for Süper Lig club Fenerbahçe.

== Club career ==
Born in Düzce, Boz began his career with local amateur side Düzce 1907 Spor, where he spent three years before reportedly training with the academy of professional side Fenerbahçe in 2018. He officially joined in September 2019, and quickly established himself as a promising player in Fenerbahçe's academy, contributing to fifteen goals in twenty-one appearances for the under-17 team at the age of fifteen. For his impressive performances in the academy, he has been likened to fellow Fenerbahçe player Arda Güler.

== International career ==
Boz has represented Turkey at youth international level. On his first appearance for the under-15 team, he scored in a 2–1 win over Hungary.
