= 2025 Turkish Super Cup =

Turkish Super Cup

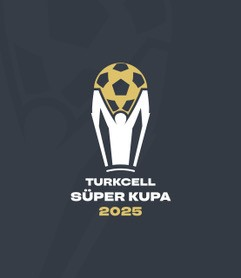
- Turkcell Super Kupa 2025 official logo

Tournament details
- Dates: 5–6 January 2026 (semi-finals); 10 January 2026 (final)
- Teams: 4
- Venue(s): Atatürk Olympic Stadium, New Adana Stadium, Gaziantep Stadium (in Istanbul, Adana, Gaziantep host cities)

Final positions
- Champions: Fenerbahçe (10th title)
- Runners-up: Galatasaray

Tournament statistics
- Matches played: 3
- Goals scored: 9 (3 per match)
- Top scorer(s): Nine players (1 goal each)

The 2025 Turkish Super Cup, or the 2025 Turkcell Super Cup (Turkish: 2025 Turkcell Süper Kupa) for sponsorship reasons, was the 52nd edition of the Turkish Super Cup since its establishment as Presidential Cup in 1966, the annual Turkish football match contested by the winners of the previous season's top league and cup competitions (or cup runner-up in case the league- and cup-winning club was the same).

In May 2025, it was announced that the competition would be changed from a two-team format to four teams, which would include a semi-final round. The matches were played as single-elimination games at neutral venue(s). As Galatasaray had won both the Süper Lig and the Turkish Cup, in the semi-finals, they faced the third-ranked Süper Lig team, while the cup runner-up played against the league runner-up. The winning teams qualified for the final match.

In the final match, Fenerbahçe defeated Galatasaray 2–0 for their tenth Turkish Super Cup title, first since 2014 and their first under the new format.

== Qualification ==
The tournament featured the winners, runners-up, and third-ranked teams of the 2024–25 Süper Lig, as well as the runners-up of the 2024–25 Turkish Cup.

=== Qualified teams ===
The following four teams qualified for the tournament.

Team	Method of qualification	Appearance	Last appearance as	Previous performance	
Team	Method of qualification	Appearance	Last appearance as	Winner(s)	Runners-up
Galatasaray	2024–25 Süper Lig and 2024–25 Turkish Cup winners	28th	2024 runners-up	17	10
Fenerbahçe	2024–25 Süper Lig runners-up	20th	2023 runners-up	9	10
Trabzonspor	2024–25 Turkish Cup runners-up	14th	2022 winners	10	3
Samsunspor	2024–25 Süper Lig third–ranked	1st	–	–	–

== Venue ==
The semi-final matches were played in Gaziantep and Adana, and the final match was played in Istanbul.

Location of the host cities of TFF Süper Kupa 2025.	Istanbul	Adana	Gaziantep
Location of the host cities of TFF Süper Kupa 2025.	Atatürk Olympic Stadium	New Adana Stadium	Gaziantep Stadium
Location of the host cities of TFF Süper Kupa 2025.	Final	Semi Final 1	Semi Final 2
Location of the host cities of TFF Süper Kupa 2025.	Capacity: 77,563	Capacity: 30,960	Capacity: 30,320

== Matches ==
=== Bracket ===
Semi-finals
SF1 - 5 January 2026 – Gaziantep
Galatasaray	4
Trabzonspor	1
SF2 - 6 January 2026 – Adana
Fenerbahçe	2
Samsunspor	0

Final
10 January 2026 – Istanbul
Galatasaray	0
Fenerbahçe	2

=== Semi-finals ===
5 January 2026
20:30 UTC+3

Galatasaray	4–1	Trabzonspor
Yılmaz 38'; Elmalı 45+3'; Akgün 63'; Icardi 81'	Report	Felipe Augusto 55'

Gaziantep Stadium, Gaziantep
Referee: Cihan Aydın

6 January 2026
20:30 UTC+3

Fenerbahçe	2–0	Samsunspor
Aktürkoğlu 4'; Durán 67'	Report

New Adana Stadium, Adana
Referee: Ali Şansalan

=== Final ===
10 January 2026
18:45 UTC+3

Galatasaray	0–2	Fenerbahçe
	Report	Guendouzi 28'; Oosterwolde 48'

Atatürk Olympic Stadium, Istanbul
Attendance: 58,397
Referee: Halil Umut Meler

== See also ==
- 2024–25 Süper Lig
- 2024–25 Turkish Cup
