= 2025–26 Erzurumspor F.K. season =

Erzurumspor
2025–26 season
- Chairman: Ahmet Dal
- Manager: (Turkey) Serkan Özbalta
- Stadium: Kazım Karabekir Stadium
- TFF 1. Lig: 1ST
- Turkish Cup: Group Stage
Home colours	Away colours	Third colours

This season will be the clubs 4th season in competitive football. During this season the club will participate in the following competitions: TFF 1. Lig, Turkish Cup.

== Current squad ==
As of 9 February 2026

Note: Flags indicate national team as defined under FIFA eligibility rules; some limited exceptions apply. Players may hold more than one non-FIFA nationality.

No.	Pos.	Nation	Player
1	GK	TUR	Erkan Anapa
2	DF	TUR	Ali Ülgen
3	DF	TUR	Yakup Kırtay
4	DF	KOS	Amar Gërxhaliu
6	MF	BEL	Brandon Baiye
7	FW	TUR	İlkan Sever
8	MF	TUR	Sefa Akgün
9	FW	TUR	Hüsamettin Yener
10	FW	TUR	Eren Tozlu
11	MF	TUR	Murat Akpınar
15	DF	GEO	Guram Giorbelidze
16	MF	TUR	Adem Eren Kabak (on loan from Konyaspor)
17	DF	TUR	Salih Sarıkaya
19	DF	BRA	Fernando Andrade

No.	Pos.	Nation	Player
20	FW	TUR	Furkan Özhan
22	DF	TUR	Mustafa Yumlu (captain)
23	DF	TUR	Cengizhan Bayrak
24	MF	ITA	Giovanni Crociata
25	DF	TUR	Ömer Arda Kara
29	FW	MLI	Cheikne Sylla
31	GK	CRO	Matija Orbanić
53	DF	TUR	Orhan Ovacıklı
65	FW	CHI	Martín Rodríguez
77	FW	TUR	Benhur Keser (on loan from Çaykur Rizespor)
83	MF	TUR	Mert Önal
98	GK	TUR	Kağan Moradaoğlu
99	FW	TUR	Mustafa Fettahoğlu

== Competitions ==
=== Club Friendlies ===
17 July 2025	(Turkey) Erzurumspor	0-2	Alanyaspor (Turkey)	Erzurum
11:00		Report	Šporar 25'; İbrahim Kaya 43'	Stadium: Kazım Karabekir Stadium

24 July 2025	(Turkey) Erzurumspor	0-0	Zob Ahan (Iran)	Erzurum
17:30		Report		Stadium: Kazım Karabekir Stadium

=== TFF 1. Lig ===
==== Results summary ====
Overall								Home						Away					
Pld	W	D	L	GF	GA	GD	Pts	W	D	L	GF	GA	GD	W	D	L	GF	GA	GD
38	23	12	3	82	27	+55	81	12	7	0	51	12	+39	11	5	3	31	15	+16

Last updated: 2 May 2026.
Source: worldfootball

==== Results by round ====
Round	1	2	3	4	5	6	7	8	9	10	11	12	13	14	15	16	17	18	19	20	21	22	23	24	25
Ground	H	A	H	A	H	A	H	A	H	A	H	A	H	A	H	A	H	A	H	A	H	A	H	A	H
Result	W	D	D	W	D	W	D	D	D	D	W	W	D	L	W	L	D	W	W	W					
Position	3	3	3	3	6	3	5	5	7	7	6	5	6	6	5	7	7	6	4	4					

Updated to match(es) played on 11 January 2026. Source: worldfootball
A = Away; H = Home; B = Bye; W = Win; D = Draw; L = Loss

==== Matches ====
9 August 2025 1	Erzurumspor	2-0	Sivasspor	Erzurum
19:00 EEST	Keser 55' 66'	Report	Paluli (yellow card) 86'	Stadium: Kazım Karabekir Stadium; Attendance: 4,619; Referee: (Turkey) Fatih Tokail

18 August 2025 2	Amed	2-2	Erzurumspor	Diyarbakır
21:30 EEST	Saba 10' (yellow card) 65'; Andrade 58'; Oktay Aydın (yellow card) 83'; Muhammed Hasan Yıldırım (yellow card) 83'; uğur gezer (yellow card) 84'; Demirtaş (yellow card) 87'	Report	Mustafa Fettahoğlu 8'; Giorbelidze (yellow card) 29'; Yumlu (yellow card) 86'; Tozlu 87' (pen.) (yellow card) 88'	Stadium: Diyarbakır Stadium; Attendance: 17,439; Referee: (Turkey) Yiğit Arslan

24 August 2025 3	Erzurumspor	3-3	Pendikspor	Erzurum
19:00 EEST	Mustafa Fettahoğlu 11'; Baiye 19'; Keser 24'; Kırtay (yellow card) 63'	Report	Mesut Özdemir (yellow card) 46'; Thuram (yellow card) 49' (goal) 88'; Wilks 63'; Clarke-Harris 71' (pen.) (yellow card) 90+5'	Stadium: Kazım Karabekir Stadium; Attendance: 5,247; Referee: (Turkey) Burak Olcar

29 August 2025 4	Sarıyer	0-2	Erzurumspor	Istanbul
21:30 EEST	Djilobodji (yellow card) 23'; Eşref Korkmazoğlu (yellow card) 38'; Mert (yellow card) 70'; Traoré (yellow card) 82'; Dembélé (yellow card) 90+13'	Report	Baiye (yellow card) 22'; Mustafa Fettahoğlu 49'; Furkan Özhan (yellow card) 90+6' (goal) 90+14'	Stadium: Yusuf Ziya Öniş Stadium; Attendance: 1,512; Referee: (Turkey) Erdem Mertoğlu

15 September 2025 5	Erzurumspor	1-1	Sakaryaspor	Erzurum
20:00 EEST	Giorbelidze (yellow card) 25'; Ovacıklı (yellow card) 68'; Keser 76'; Hüsamettin Yener (yellow card) 90+5'	Report	Dursun (yellow card) 6'; Vuković (yellow card) 45+3'; Kakuta 69'; Demir (yellow card) 87'	Stadium: Kazım Karabekir Stadium; Attendance: 5,318; Referee: (Turkey) Muhammet Metoğlu

20 September 2025 6	Adana Demirspor	0-3	Erzurumspor	Adana
19:00 EEST	Yücel Gürol (yellow card) 45+2'	Report	Yumlu 3'; Yücel Gürol 25' (o.g.); Keser (yellow card) 44'; Hüsamettin Yener 90+1'	Stadium: New Adana Stadium; Attendance: 482; Referee: (Turkey) Melih Kurt

24 September 2025 7	Erzurumspor	1-1	Keçiörengücü	Erzurum
17:00 EEST	Mustafa Fettahoğlu 1'; Tozlu (yellow card) 27'; Keser (yellow card) 44'; Kırtay (yellow card) 81'; Yumlu (yellow card) 90+7'	Report	İshak Karaoğul (yellow card) 58'; Rroca 88' (pen.)	Stadium: Kazım Karabekir Stadium; Attendance: 2,807; Referee: (Turkey) Mehmet Özer

28 September 2025 8	Serikspor	1-1	Erzurumspor	Serik
19:00 EEST	Gotsuk (yellow card) 18'; Terzi 39' (yellow card) 70'; Dilli (yellow card) 67'; Aleksandr Martynov (yellow card) 90+3'	Report	Crociata 55'; Rodríguez (yellow card) 77'; Kırtay (yellow card) 90+3'	Stadium: İsmail Oğan Stadium; Attendance: 498; Referee: (Turkey) Süleyman Bahadır

4 October 2025 9	Erzurumspor	1-1	Vanspor	Erzurum
16:00 EEST	Akgün (yellow card) 44'; Tozlu 55'; Kırtay (yellow card) 66'; Keser (yellow card) 90+3'; Baiye (yellow card) 90+6'	Report	Cédric (yellow card) 6'; Naby Oularé (yellow card) 35'; Matija Orbanić 68' (o.g.); Jefferson (yellow card) 80'; Genç (yellow card) 85'; Bilal (yellow card) 88'; Sabahattin Destici (yellow card) 90+3'	Stadium: Kazım Karabekir Stadium; Attendance: 3,514; Referee: (Turkey) Ömer Tolga Güldibi

18 October 2025 10	Manisa	1-1	Erzurumspor	Manisa
13:30 EEST	Touré (yellow card) 11'; Kadir Kaan Yurdakul (yellow card) 39'; Yusuf Talum (yellow card) 40'; Karapo (yellow card) 45+3'; Diony 53'; Hérelle (yellow card) 90+3'	Report	Rodríguez 63' (yellow card) 80'; Baiye (yellow card) 70'	Stadium: Manisa 19 Mayıs Stadium; Attendance: 825; Referee: (Turkey) Gürcan Hasova

24 October 2025 11	Erzurumspor	2-0	Ümraniyespor	Erzurum
16:00 EEST	Mustafa Fettahoğlu 66'; Giorbelidze (yellow card) 80'; Cheikne Sylla 83' (yellow card) 90+1'	Report	Soukou (yellow card) 6'; Göksu (yellow card) 50'; Oğuz Yıldırım (yellow card) 62'; Ekincier (yellow card) 90+4'	Stadium: Kazım Karabekir Stadium; Attendance: 1,519; Referee: (Turkey) Oğuzhan Aksu

31 October 2025 12	Hatayspor	0-3	Erzurumspor	Antakya
19:00 EEST	Kâmil Çörekçi (red card) 14'; Temel (yellow card) 27'; Ünal Durmuşhan (yellow card) 38'; Sağlam (yellow card) 90'	Report	Tozlu 35' 62'; Crociata (yellow card) 42'; Keser (yellow card) 48'; Cheikne Sylla 88'	Stadium: Fuat Tosyalı Stadium; Attendance: 179; Referee: (Turkey) Alpaslan Şen

9 November 2025 13	Erzurumspor	1-1	Esenler Erokspor	Erzurum
12:30 EEST	Crociata (yellow card) 45+1'; Tozlu 68'; Kırtay (yellow card) 71'; Özbalta (yellow card) 75'	Report	Eray Korkmaz (yellow card) 31'; Amilton (yellow card) 35'; Mame Mor Faye (yellow card) 45'; Nzaba (yellow card) 63'; Čataković 83'; Kacar (yellow card) 86'; Alper Karaman (yellow card) 89'	Stadium: Kazım Karabekir Stadium; Attendance: 3,007; Referee: (Turkey) Atilla Karaoğlan

23 November 2025 14	Iğdır	2-1	Erzurumspor	Iğdır
12:30 EEST	Gërxhaliu 15' (o.g.); Tepe (yellow card) 30'; Bekaroğlu (yellow card) 55'; Bruno 61'	Report	Kirtay (yellow card) 23'; Keser (yellow card) 28'; Tozlu 31' (pen.); Mustafa Fettahoğlu (yellow card) 90+4'	Stadium: Iğdır City Stadium; Attendance: 1,273; Referee: (Turkey) Furkan Aksuoğlu

29 November 2025 15	Erzurumspor	4-0	İstanbulspor	Erzurum
12:30 EET	Mustafa Fettahoğlu 45+2' (yellow card) 87'; Tozlu 53' 69'; Keser (yellow card) 57'; Gërxhaliu 90+3'	Report		Stadium: Kazım Karabekir Stadium; Attendance: 3,367; Referee: (Turkey) Ozan Ergün

7 December 2025 16	Boluspor	2-0	Erzurumspor	Bolu
12:30 EET	Lucas Lima (yellow card) 29'; Davas 35'; Liço (yellow card) 57'; Çağıran (yellow card) 77'; Boakye 86'	Report	Ovacıklı (yellow card) 78'	Stadium: Bolu Atatürk Stadium; Attendance: 591; Referee: (Turkey) Batuhan Kolak

14 December 2025 17	Erzurumspor	2-2	Bodrum	Erzurum
12:30 EET	Yumlu 8'; Mustafa Fettahoğlu (yellow card) 36'; Matija Orbanić (yellow card) 42'; Tozlu 83' (yellow card) 86'	Report	Yılmaz (yellow card) 28'; Fredy 42' (yellow card) 45+3'; Mohammed 47'	Stadium: Kazım Karabekir Stadium; Attendance: 2,747; Referee: (Turkey) Kadir Sağlam

20 December 2025 18	Bandırmaspor	0-2	Erzurumspor	Bandırma
12:30 EET	Mulumba (yellow card) 69'; Yiğit Zorluer (yellow card) 75'	Report	Tozlu 45'; Gërxhaliu (yellow card) 69'; Crociata (yellow card) 89'; Cheikne Sylla (yellow card) 89'; Adem Kabak (red card) 90+1'; Baiye 90+4'	Stadium: Bandırma 17 September Stadium; Attendance: 1,061; Referee: (Turkey) Davut Çelik

28 December 2025 19	Erzurumspor	1-0	Çorum	Erzurum
15:00 EET	Keser (yellow card) 26' (goal) 52'; Yumlu (yellow card) 36'; Tozlu (yellow card) 84'; Emre Erdem (yellow card) 90+5'	Report	Eze (yellow card) 57'; Šehić (yellow card) 90+3'	Stadium: Kazım Karabekir Stadium; Attendance: 1,796; Referee: (Turkey) Burak Pakkan

11 January 2026 20	Sivasspor	0-2	Erzurumspor	Sivas
15:00 EET	Yiğiter (red card) 29'; Charisis (yellow card) 80'; Erdoğan (yellow card) 90+2'	Report	Keser 41'; Giorbelidze (yellow card) 68'; Crociata 90+3'	Stadium: New Sivas 4 September Stadium; Referee: (Turkey) Adnan Kayatepe

=== Turkish Cup ===
3 December 2025 Fourth Round	Kahramanmaraşspor	1-3 (a.e.t.)	Erzurumspor	Kahramanmaraş
12:30	Muhammet Toklu 3'; Mustafa Yikilmaz (yellow card) 24' (yellow-red card) 85'	Report	Mustafa Fettahoğlu (yellow card) 25' (yellow-red card) 42'; Ali Ülgen (yellow card) 70'; Cheikne Sylla 28' 97' 120+3'	Stadium: Batıpark Adem Şahan Stadium

==== Group C ====
Pos	Team	Pld	W	D	L	GF	GA	GD	Pts	Qualification	BEŞ	FEN	ERZ	GAZ	KOC	RİZ	BEY	KEÇ
1	Beşiktaş	4	3	1	0	10	3	+7	10	Quarter-finals						4–1		3–0
2	Fenerbahçe	4	3	0	1	9	3	+6	9	Quarter-finals	1–2		3–1					
3	Erzurumspor	4	2	0	2	8	8	0	6							2–0		4–2
4	Gaziantep	4	2	0	2	8	10	−2	6			0–4			1–0			
5	Kocaelispor	4	1	1	2	4	4	0	4		1–1		3–1					
6	Rizespor	4	1	1	2	7	9	−2	4					5–2			1–1	
7	Beyoğlu Yeni Çarşı	4	1	1	2	3	5	−2	4			0–1			1–0			
8	Keçiörengücü	4	1	0	3	6	13	−7	3					1–5			3–1	

Source: TFF.org
Legend: Blue = home team win; Yellow = draw; Red = away team win.

==== Matches ====
23 December 2025 Match 1	Kocaelispor	3-1	Erzurumspor	Kocaeli
14:00 EET	Churlinov 18' 45'; Nonge 53'; Balogh (yellow card) 76'; Linetty (yellow card) 85'	Report	Emre Erdem (yellow card) 47'; Baiye 88'	Stadium: Kocaeli Stadium; Referee: (Turkey) Turgut Doman

15 January 2026 Match 2	Erzurumspor	2-0	Rizespor	Erzurum
12:00 EET	Tozlu 42'; Salih Sarıkaya 54'; Hüsamettin Yener (yellow card) 80'	Report	Canpolat (yellow card) 45+1'; Antalyalı (yellow card) 56'	Stadium: Kazım Karabekir Stadium; Referee: (Turkey) Ömer Gültekin
