= 2026–27 Süper Lig =

69th season of top tier Turkish football league

Süper Lig
- Season: 2026–27
- Dates: 14 August 2026 – 23 May 2027
- Matches: 81
- Goals: 235 (2.9 per match)
- Top goalscorer: Gift Orban; Mohamed Salah (7 goals each)
- Biggest home win: Fenerbahçe 8–0 Eyüpspor (20 September 2026)
- Biggest away win: Erzurumspor 0–4 Galatasaray (21 August 2026)
- Highest scoring: Fenerbahçe 8–0 Eyüpspor (20 September 2026); Beşiktaş 6–2 Çorum (31 August 2026)
- Longest winning run: Beşiktaş; Galatasaray; Kocaelispor (3 matches)
- Longest unbeaten run: Galatasaray; Kasımpaşa (3 matches)
- Longest winless run: Konyaspor (4 matches)
- Longest losing run: Konyaspor (4 matches)
- All statistics correct as of 11 September 2026.

The 2026–27 Süper Lig, officially Trendyol Süper Lig Adnan Süvari season, is the 69th season of the Süper Lig, the highest tier football league of Turkey. It began on 14 August 2026. The season is set to end on 23 May 2027.

This season is named after the former player and coach Adnan Süvari, best known for his career in Göztepe, who died in 1991.

== Teams ==
Eighteen teams will compete in the league – the top fifteen teams from the previous season and the three teams promoted from the 1. Lig.

=== Changes from last season ===
==== Relegations ====
Antalyaspor, Kayserispor and Fatih Karagümrük were relegated to the 2026–27 TFF 1. Lig.

==== Promotions ====
Erzurumspor was promoted to Süper Lig after 5 seasons of absence. Amed and Çorum were promoted to Süper Lig for their first time in their histories.

=== Stadiums and locations ===
Location of teams in 2026–27 Süper Lig
Clubs located in Istanbul

Note: Table lists in alphabetical order.

Team	Home city/borough	Home province	Stadium	Capacity
Alanyaspor	Alanya	Antalya	Alanya Oba Stadium	9,789
Amed	Diyarbakır	Diyarbakır	Diyarbakır Stadium	30,480
Başakşehir	Başakşehir	Istanbul	Başakşehir Fatih Terim Stadium	17,067
Beşiktaş	Beşiktaş	Istanbul	Tüpraş Stadium	42,684
Çorum	Çorum	Çorum	Çorum City Stadium	13,119
Erzurumspor	Erzurum	Erzurum	Kazım Karabekir Stadium	20,347
Eyüpspor	Eyüpsultan	Istanbul	Esenyurt Necmi Kadıoğlu Stadium	4,274
Fenerbahçe	Kadıköy	Istanbul	Chobani Stadium	47,911
Galatasaray	Sarıyer	Istanbul	Rams Park	53,387
Gaziantep	Gaziantep	Gaziantep	Gaziantep Stadium	30,320
Gençlerbirliği	Yenimahalle	Ankara	Eryaman Stadium	20,672
Göztepe	Göztepe	İzmir	Gürsel Aksel Stadium	23,376
Kasımpaşa	Kasımpaşa	Istanbul	Recep Tayyip Erdoğan Stadium	13,797
Kocaelispor	İzmit	Kocaeli	Kocaeli Stadium	34,829
Konyaspor	Konya	Konya	Konya Metropolitan Municipality Stadium	41,135
Rizespor	Rize	Rize	Rize City Stadium	14,879
Samsunspor	Samsun	Samsun	Samsun 19 Mayıs Stadium	34,346
Trabzonspor	Trabzon	Trabzon	Papara Park	41,061

=== Personnel and kits ===
Team	Manager	Captain	Kit manufacturer	Shirt sponsors	
Team	Manager	Captain	Kit manufacturer	Chest	Other(s)
Alanyaspor	(Portugal) João Pereira	(Kosovo) Fidan Aliti	(Germany) Puma	None	List: Side: None; Back: None; Sleeves: Corendon Airlines; Shorts: None; Socks: None
Amed	(Kosovo) Besnik Hasi	(Turkey) Mehmet Yeşil	(United States) Nike	Otostore / Azel İnşaat / Plaza Hotel / İçkale Yapı / Sur Beton	List: Side: Amedstore; Back: Nil Yapı; Sleeves: None; Shorts: None; Socks: None
Başakşehir	(Turkey) Nuri Şahin	(Turkey) Ömer Ali Şahiner	(Germany) Puma	Todini Costruzioni / Turkish Airlines (in European matches)	List: Side: Homend; Back: YKT Filo Kiralama; Sleeves: Doğa Sigorta; Shorts: None; Socks: Bolero Socks
Beşiktaş	(Italy) Vincenzo Italiano	(Turkey) Orkun Kökçü	(United States) Nike	Beko	List: Side: Cabir Yapı; Back: Tera Yatırım Holding; Sleeves: Misli; Shorts: Cola Turka; Socks: BJKtalk
Çorum	(Turkey) Burak Yılmaz	(Turkey) Ferhat Yazgan	(Spain) Joma	ARCA Aero	List: Side: None; Back: Balkar İnşaat; Sleeves: Gdh; Shorts: Lotus; Socks: Asya İklimlendirme
Erzurumspor	(Turkey) Serkan Özbalta	(Turkey) Eren Tozlu	(England) Umbro	Aşkale Çimento / Gür Group Yapı İnşaat	List: Side: Gür Group Yapı İnşaat / Aşkale Çimento; Back: Palen Doğalgaz; Sleeves: Rexoil Lubricants; Shorts: None; Socks: None
Eyüpspor	(Turkey) Mustafa Dalcı	(Brazil) Lucas Calegari	(United States) Nike	None	List: Side: None; Back: Fuzul Holding; Sleeves: None; Shorts: None; Socks: None
Fenerbahçe	(Netherlands) Dirk Kuyt (interim)	(Slovakia) Milan Škriniar	(Germany) Adidas	Otokoç / Chobani (in European matches)	List: Side: Acıbadem; Back: Halley; Sleeves: Nesine, Cabir Holding; Shorts: None; Socks: None
Galatasaray	(Turkey) Okan Buruk	(Turkey) Abdülkerim Bardakcı	(Germany) Puma	Pasifik Holding	List: Side: None; Back: None; Sleeves: Sürat Kargo, Misli / Turkish Airlines (in European matches); Shorts: Reges Elektrik; Socks: Port Filo
Gaziantep	(Turkey) Orhan Ak	(Romania) Alexandru Maxim	(Germany) Adidas	None	List: Side: Arıkan Group; Back: Köksan; Sleeves: Mahmood Coffee; Shorts: None; Socks: Gbb Enerji
Gençlerbirliği	(Germany) Bernd Storck	(Greece) Dimitrios Goutas	(United States) Nike	Cajun Corner / Anadolu Hotels / Oyman / ANLOG Lojistik / Zarif Altyapı	List: Side: MAD Parfumeur / Agaya Hotels / Şenler Grup / Özbek Geoteknik / Atarlar Grup; Back: Bordo 145; Sleeves: Cajun Corner; Shorts: Florya Holding; Socks: None
Göztepe	(Bulgaria) Stanimir Stoilov	(Turkey) Ogün Bayrak	(England) Umbro	Euroil	List: Side: Solares; Back: Bi'Talih; Sleeves: tatilsepeti, Osmanlı Yatırım; Shorts: HDI Sigorta, Pasha Group; Socks: EMOT Hastanesi
Kasımpaşa	(Turkey) Emre Belözoğlu	(Bosnia and Herzegovina) Haris Hajradinović	(Germany) Adidas	Aksa	List: Side: Reges Enerji; Back: Safi Çimento; Sleeves: Maki Filo, Bizigo; Shorts: YKT Filo Kiralama; Socks: None
Kocaelispor	(Turkey) Selçuk İnan	(Croatia) Bruno Petkovic	(Germany) Adidas	Safiport	List: Side: TURKA Araç Muayene; Back: None; Sleeves: Hyundai; Shorts: Nuh Çimento; Socks: None
Konyaspor	(Turkey) İlhan Palut	(Turkey) Adil Demirbağ	(Denmark) Hummel	Tümosan	List: Side: Teksin Konteyner; Back: Atiker; Sleeves: Torku; Shorts: Rey Organic, Pasha Group; Socks: Mci Tool
Rizespor	(Turkey) Recep Uçar	(Turkey) Taylan Antalyalı	(Germany) Adidas	Çaykur	List: Side: None; Back: Ricosta Hotel; Sleeves: Didi Soğuk Çay; Shorts: Didi Soğuk Çay; Socks: None
Samsunspor	(Croatia) Nenad Bjelica	(Turkey) Emre Kılınç	(Denmark) Hummel	CoreX Holding	List: Side: None; Back: Yılport; Sleeves: None; Shorts: None; Socks: Sarıyer Kola
Trabzonspor	(Germany) Thomas Reis	(Montenegro) Stefan Savić	(Spain) Joma	Papara	List: Side: Reges Enerji; Back: Onvo; Sleeves: Yıldız Entegre, QNB; Shorts: YKT Filo Kiralama; Socks: None

Notes

- Adidas is the official ball supplier for Süper Lig.
- Hummel is the official sponsor of the Referee's Committee of the Turkish Football Federation.

=== Managerial changes ===
Team	Outgoing manager	Manner of departure	Date of vacancy	Position in the table	Incoming manager	Date of appointment
Amed	(Turkey) Sertaç Küçükbayrak	End of interim spell	2 May 2026	Pre-season	(Kosovo) Besnik Hasi	10 June 2026
Fenerbahçe	(Turkey) Zeki Murat Göle	End of interim spell	17 May 2026	Pre-season	(Turkey) İsmail Kartal	18 June 2026
Beşiktaş	(Turkey) Sergen Yalçın	Mutual consent	18 May 2026	Pre-season	(Italy) Vincenzo Italiano	5 June 2026
Eyüpspor	(Turkey) Atila Gerin	Mutual consent	9 June 2026	Pre-season	(Turkey) Özhan Pulat	29 June 2026
Gaziantep	(Romania) Mirel Rădoi	Mutual consent	31 August 2026	13th	(Turkey) Orhan Ak	4 September 2026
Trabzonspor	(Turkey) Fatih Tekke	Mutual consent	1 September 2026	11th	(Turkey) Hüseyin Çimşir (interim)	1 September 2026
Trabzonspor	(Turkey) Hüseyin Çimşir (interim)	End of interim spell	17 September 2026	9th	(Germany) Thomas Reis	17 September 2026
Fenerbahçe	(Turkey) İsmail Kartal	Resigned	27 October 2026	5th	(Netherlands) Dirk Kuyt (interim)	28 October 2026

== Foreign players ==
All clubs can register foreign players up to 14 players, including U23 players (born in 2003 or after). Players with Turkish descent who were born in other countries do not count as foreign players.

- Player names in **bold** indicate the player was registered during the mid-season transfer window.
- Player names in italics were out of the squad or left the club within the season, after the pre-season transfer window, or in the mid-season transfer window, and at least had one appearance.

Team	Player 1	Player 2	Player 3	Player 4	Player 5	Player 6	Player 7	Player 8	Player 9	Player 10	Player 11	Player 12	U23 players	Unregistered players	Former players
Alanyaspor	(Brazil) Paulo Victor	(Cameroon) Iván Cédric	(Republic of the Congo) Gaius Makouta	(Democratic Republic of the Congo) Meschak Elia	(Kosovo) Fidan Aliti	(Kosovo) Florent Hadergjonaj	(Portugal) Nuno Lima	(Romania) Ianis Hagi	(South Korea) Hwang Ui-jo	(Spain) Paolo Fernandes			(Angola) Maestro (Brazil) Ruan (Ivory Coast) Arouna Soro (Tunisia) Omar Ben Ali		
Amedspor	(Israel) Dia Saba	(Ivory Coast) Alban Lafont	(Kosovo) Ermal Krasniqi	(Kosovo) Lumbardh Dellova	(Madagascar) Rayan Raveloson	(Nigeria) Gift Orban	(Nigeria) Yira Sor	(Scotland) David Bates	(Senegal) Mbaye Diagne	(Switzerland) Samuel Ballet			(Comoros) Rayan Lutin (Guinea) Amadou Cissé		
Başakşehir	(Bosnia and Herzegovina) Edin Višća	(Cameroon) Olivier Kemen	(Croatia) Ivan Brnić	(Denmark) Andreas Skov Olsen	(Germany) Davie Selke	(Ghana) Jerome Opoku	(Ivory Coast) Christopher Opéri	(Poland) Jakub Kałuziński	(Poland) Michał Karbownik	(Senegal) Ousseynou Ba	(Uzbekistan) Eldor Shomurodov		(Georgia (country)) Saba Kharebashvili (Uzbekistan) Abbosbek Fayzullaev		
Beşiktaş	(Benin) Junior Olaitan	(Belgium) Leandro Trossard	(Czech Republic) Václav Černý	(Germany) Alexander Nübel	(Ivory Coast) Emmanuel Agbadou	(Kosovo) Milot Rashica	(Nigeria) Wilfred Ndidi	(Panama) Michael Amir Murillo	(Portugal) Tiago Djaló	(Serbia) Dušan Vlahović	(South Korea) Oh Hyeon-gyu		(Ivory Coast) Kassoum Ouattara (Italy) Fabio Miretti (Netherlands) Ernest Poku		
Çaykur Rizespor	(Albania) Qazim Laçi	(Bosnia and Herzegovina) Dal Varešanović	(The Gambia) Ali Sowe	(Hungary) Attila Mocsi	(Italy) Gennaro Borrelli	(Ivory Coast) Yahia Fofana	(Mali) Modibo Sagnan	(Nigeria) Ibrahim Olawoyin	(Romania) Valentin Mihăilă				(France) Siaka Bakayoko (France) Zakaria Ariss (Mali) Moussa Diakité (Romania) Iustin Doicaru (Scotland) Adedire Mebude	(Uzbekistan) Husniddin Aliqulov	(Senegal) Mame Mor Faye
Çorum	(Albania) Ylber Ramadani	(Angola) Fredy	(Brazil) Marcos Felipe	(Croatia) Hrvoje Smolčić	(Greece) Alexandros Kyziridis	(Ivory Coast) Mohamed Diomande	(Norway) Markus Karlsbakk	(Portugal) Alexandre Penetra	(Senegal) Mame Thiam	(Venezuela) Jesús Ramírez			(Bosnia and Herzegovina) Ermin Mahmić (Germany) Youssoufa Moukoko (Romania) Andrei Borza		
Erzurumspor	(Belgium) Brandon Baiye	(Bosnia and Herzegovina) Nihad Mujakić	(Chile) Martín Rodríguez	(Croatia) Matija Orbanić	(Georgia (country)) Guram Giorbelidze	(Ghana) Elisha Owusu	(Republic of Ireland) Festy Ebosele	(Ivory Coast) Ibrahim Diabate	(Kosovo) Amar Gërxhaliu	(Portugal) Miguel Cardoso	(Suriname) Gyrano Kerk		(Azerbaijan) Nariman Akhundzade (Ghana) Lawrence Agyekum		(Brazil) Fernando Andrade
Eyüpspor	(Republic of the Congo) Chandrel Massanga	(France) Bilal Boutobba	(France) Charles-André Raux-Yao	(France) Lenny Pintor	(Italy) Simone Giordano	(Morocco) Abdelhamid Sabiri	(Morocco) Jawad El Yamiq	(Poland) Konrad Michalak	(Romania) Horațiu Moldovan	(Scotland) Zak Jules			(Cape Verde) David Costa (Ivory Coast) Christ Sadia (Nigeria) Ahmed Abdullahi (Senegal) Diabel Ndoye	(Senegal) Abdou Khadre Sy	(Brazil) Lucas Calegari
Fenerbahçe	(Belgium) Romelu Lukaku	(Brazil) Ederson	(England) Archie Brown	(England) Mason Greenwood	(France) Mattéo Guendouzi	(France) N'Golo Kanté	(Kosovo) Vedat Muriqi	(Mali) Dorgeles Nene	(Netherlands) Nathan Aké	(Portugal) Nélson Semedo	(Slovakia) Milan Škriniar	(Spain) Marco Asensio	(Ghana) Kojo Peprah Oppong (Serbia) Ognjen Mimović	(Netherlands) Jayden Oosterwolde (Senegal) Abdou Aziz Fall (Senegal) Amara Diouf	(Brazil) Talisca
Galatasaray	(Brazil) Gabriel Sara	(Colombia) Davinson Sánchez	(Gabon) Mario Lemina	(Germany) Leroy Sané	(Hungary) Roland Sallai	(Ivory Coast) Wilfried Singo	(Nigeria) Victor Osimhen	(Portugal) Rafael Leão	(Senegal) Ismail Jakobs	(Uruguay) Lucas Torreira			(France) El Chadaille Bitshiabu (France) Lesley Ugochukwu (Guinea-Bissau) Renato Nhaga (Russia) Aleksey Batrakov		
Gaziantep	(Curaçao) Juninho Bacuna	(Curaçao) Sontje Hansen	(Ivory Coast) Abakar Sylla	(Ivory Coast) Drissa Camara	(Ivory Coast) Ulrich Meleke	(Jamaica) Trivante Stewart	(Poland) Kacper Tobiasz	(Romania) Alexandru Maxim	(Romania) Deian Sorescu	(Spain) Luis Pérez	(Suriname) Myenty Abena		(Bosnia and Herzegovina) Enver Kulašin (Nigeria) Victor Gidado (Poland) Kacper Kozłowski	(The Gambia) Karamba Gassama	(Romania) Florin Ștefan
Gençlerbirliği	(Brazil) Thalisson	(Greece) Dimitrios Goutas	(Italy) Franco Tongya	(Mali) Adama Traoré	(Mali) Sékou Koïta	(Nigeria) Peter Etebo	(Portugal) Pedro Mendes	(Portugal) Pedro Pereira	(Portugal) Tiago Gouveia	(Senegal) Cheikh Niasse			(Guinea) Ousmane Diabaté (Liberia) Prince Martor Jr. (Nigeria) Victor Orakpo (Portugal) Rafael Luís	(Portugal) Kévin Rodrigues	(Mali) Moussa Kyabou (Slovenia) Žan Žužek
Göztepe	(Brazil) Allan Godói	(Brazil) André Henrique	(Brazil) Janderson	(Brazil) Juan	(Brazil) Rhaldney	(Cameroon) Malcom Bokele	(England) Tino Anjorin	(The Gambia) Noah Sonko Sundberg	(Georgia (country)) Luka Gugeshashvili	(Switzerland) Alexis Antunes	(Tanzania) Novatus Miroshi		(England) Alex Matos (Republic of Ireland) Sinclair Armstrong (United Arab Emirates) Richard Akonnor	(Jordan) Ibrahim Sabra	(Tunisia) Amin Cherni
Kasımpaşa	(Bosnia and Herzegovina) Haris Hajradinović	(Brazil) Cláudio Winck	(France) Kévin Mouanga	(Ghana) Jesurun Rak-Sakyi	(Greece) Andreas Gianniotis	(Iceland) Andri Baldursson	(Mali) Fousseni Diabaté	(Poland) Adrian Benedyczak	(Romania) Matei Ilie	(Tunisia) Mortadha Ben Ouanes			(Cape Verde) Elson Mendes (Denmark) Jakob Jessen (Sweden) Marcus Rafferty (Tunisia) Adem Arous	(Mali) Thiemoko Diarra (Netherlands) Godfried Frimpong	
Kocaelispor	(Angola) Show	(Croatia) Bruno Petković	(Croatia) Matej Maglica	(France) Florian Ayé	(Germany) Makana Baku	(Ghana) Dan Agyei	(Honduras) Rigoberto Rivas	(Mali) Massadio Haïdara	(Serbia) Aleksandar Jovanović	(Suriname) Anfernee Dijksteel			(France) Tanguy Zoukrou (Norway) Tobias Gulliksen (Portugal) Gonçalo Sousa (Spain) Mahamadou Susoho		
Konyaspor	(Republic of the Congo) Yhoan Andzouana	(Democratic Republic of the Congo) Arthur Masuaku	(Democratic Republic of the Congo) Jackson Muleka	(Egypt) Mostafa Mohamed	(France) Jean-Luc Dompé	(The Gambia) Ebrima Colley	(Nigeria) Chidozie Awaziem	(North Macedonia) Enis Bardhi	(Portugal) Diogo Gonçalves	(Serbia) Marko Jevtović			(Brazil) Da Mata (Hungary) Rajmund Tóth		(Slovenia) Blaž Kramer
Samsunspor	(France) Tanguy Coulibaly	(Guinea) Mohamed Bayo	(Iceland) Logi Tómasson	(Ivory Coast) Jaurès Assoumou	(Portugal) Afonso Sousa	(Scotland) Elliot Watt	(Serbia) Strahinja Eraković	(Sweden) Joe Mendes					(Denmark) Oskar Øhlenschlæger (The Gambia) Saikuba Jarju (Italy) Gabriele Guarino (Mali) Antoine Sekongo (Poland) Igor Drapiński		(Chad) Marius Mouandilmadji (Republic of the Congo) Antoine Makoumbou (Croatia) Toni Borevković (Ivory Coast) Ali Badra Diabaté
Trabzonspor	(Albania) Ernest Muçi	(Brazil) Fabinho	(Cameroon) André Onana	(Cape Verde) Wagner Pina	(Cape Verde) Sidny Lopes Cabral	(Egypt) Mohamed Salah	(France) Tim Jabol-Folcarelli	(Montenegro) Stefan Savić	(Nigeria) Paul Onuachu	(Ukraine) Arseniy Batahov	(Ukraine) Ruslan Malinovskyi		(Guinea-Bissau) Franculino Djú (Nigeria) Chibuike Nwaiwu (Portugal) Noah Saviolo	(France) Batista Mendy (Morocco) Benjamin Bouchouari	

== League table ==
Pos	Team	Pld	W	D	L	GF	GA	GD	Pts	Qualification or relegation
1	Galatasaray	12	10	1	1	29	16	+13	31	Qualification for the Champions League league phase
2	Trabzonspor	11	8	1	2	26	8	+18	25	Qualification for the Champions League third qualifying round
3	Amedspor	12	7	2	3	28	17	+11	23	Qualification for the Europa League second qualifying round
4	Beşiktaş	11	7	1	3	23	12	+11	22	Qualification for the Conference League second qualifying round
5	Fenerbahçe	12	6	2	4	31	12	+19	20	
6	Kasımpaşa	11	5	5	1	17	11	+6	20	
7	Kocaelispor	12	6	2	4	15	11	+4	20	
8	Başakşehir	11	5	2	4	19	17	+2	17	
9	Rizespor	12	5	2	5	15	16	−1	17	
10	Çorum	11	5	1	5	21	21	0	16	
11	Göztepe	11	4	3	4	22	19	+3	15	
12	Erzurumspor	11	4	2	5	10	17	−7	14	
13	Gençlerbirliği	12	4	2	6	13	21	−8	14	
14	Alanyaspor	11	3	3	5	9	18	−9	12	
15	Konyaspor	11	2	2	7	6	14	−8	8	
16	Gaziantep	12	2	2	8	9	20	−11	8	Relegation to TFF 1. Lig
17	Samsunspor	12	2	1	9	12	28	−16	7	Relegation to TFF 1. Lig
18	Eyüpspor	11	1	0	10	3	30	−27	3	Relegation to TFF 1. Lig

Updated to match(es) played on 21 November 2026. Source: Süper Lig
Rules for classification: 1) Points; 2) Head-to-head points; 3) Head-to-head goal difference; 4) Head-to-head goals scored; 5) Goal difference; 6) Goals scored; 7) Play-off.
(Note: Head-to-head record is used only after all the matches between the teams in question have been played)

== Results ==
Home \ Away	ALA	AME	BAŞ	BEŞ	ÇOR	ERZ	EYÜ	FEN	GAL	GAZ	GEN	GÖZ	KAS	KOC	KON	RİZ	SAM	TRA
Alanyaspor	—			1–0		0–0						2–2		1–2				0–2
Amedspor		—	5–0	3–2		3–0	5–1								1–0	0–2		2–1
Başakşehir			—						2–3	2–1	4–0		1–1	2–0			5–2	
Beşiktaş			2–0	—	6–2	3–0	1–0				3–0			2–1				
Çorum	1–2				—		3–0	0–5					0–1					
Erzurumspor					1–3	—	2–0		0–4						1–0		1–0	
Eyüpspor	2–1						—			0–1		0–4	0–1	0–2		0–2		
Fenerbahçe	3–0			1–2			8–0	—				1–2			4–2			
Galatasaray		4–3			2–2			2–1	—			3–2	3–1	1–0			2–1	
Gaziantep	1–1				0–3	1–3		0–0		—			0–2			1–2		
Gençlerbirliği	5–0	2–2				1–1		2–1	0–1	1–0	—		1–2					
Göztepe			1–2		2–0					2–4	0–1	—				2–2		
Kasımpaşa		2–2		2–2									—		0–0		4–1	1–1
Kocaelispor		2–0						2–2		2–0		1–2		—		0–0	1–0	
Konyaspor			0–0						0–4		2–0			1–2	—	0–1		1–0
Rizespor	0–1					2–1		0–3								—	0–2	3–4
Samsunspor		1–2			1–5			0–2				3–3			1–0		—	0–3
Trabzonspor			2–1	2–0					4–0	2–0	5–0							—

Updated to match(es) played on 21 November 2026. Source: Turkish Football Federation (in Turkish)
Legend: Blue = home team win; Yellow = draw; Red = away team win.
For upcoming matches, an "a" indicates there is an article about the rivalry between the two participants.

== Number of teams by geographical region ==
Number	Region	Team(s)
7	Marmara	Başakşehir, Beşiktaş, Eyüpspor, Fenerbahçe, Galatasaray, Kasımpaşa and Kocaelispor
4	Black Sea	Çorum, Rizespor, Samsunspor and Trabzonspor
2	Central Anatolia	Gençlerbirliği and Konyaspor
2	Southeastern Anatolia	Amedspor and Gaziantep
1	Aegean	Göztepe
1	Eastern Anatolia	Erzurumspor
1	Mediterranean	Alanyaspor

== Statistics ==
=== Top scorers ===
Updated at 25 October 2026

Rank	Player	Club(s)	Goals
1	(Nigeria) Gift Orban	Amedspor	8
1	(Egypt) Mohamed Salah	Trabzonspor	8
3	(Kosovo) Vedat Muriqi	Fenerbahçe	7
3	(Uzbekistan) Eldor Shomurodov	Başakşehir	7
5	(Poland) Adrian Benedyczak	Kasımpaşa	6
5	(Brazil) Juan	Göztepe	6
5	(Nigeria) Victor Osimhen	Galatasaray	6
5	(Serbia) Dušan Vlahović	Beşiktaş	6
9	(Israel) Dia Saba	Amedspor	5
10	(England) Mason Greenwood	Fenerbahçe	4
10	(Venezuela) Jesús Ramírez	Çorum	4
10	(Turkey) Berkan Kutlu	Kocaelispor	4
10	(Greece) Alexandros Kyziridis	Çorum	4
10	(Turkey) Cengiz Ünder	Çorum	4

=== Hat-tricks ===
Date	Player	For	Against	Result
31 August 2026	(Serbia) Dušan Vlahović	Beşiktaş	Çorum	6–2 (H)
13 September 2026	(Nigeria) Gift Orban	Amedspor	Başakşehir	5–0 (H)
19 September 2026	(Egypt) Mohamed Salah	Trabzonspor	Galatasaray	4–0 (H)
20 September 2026	(Kosovo) Vedat Muriqi^{4}	Fenerbahçe	Eyüpspor	8–0 (H)
12 October 2026	(Brazil) André Henrique	Göztepe	Eyüpspor	0–4 (A)

=== Clean sheets ===
Rank	Player	Club(s)	Clean sheets
1	(Brazil) Ederson	Fenerbahçe	5
2	(Turkey) Bahadır Han Güngördü	Konyaspor	4
2	(Cameroon) André Onana	Trabzonspor	4
2	(Turkey) Ertuğrul Taşkıran	Alanyaspor	4
5	(Turkey) Uğurcan Çakır	Galatasaray	3
5	(Greece) Andreas Gianniotis	Kasımpaşa	3
5	(Ivory Coast) Alban Lafont	Amedspor	3
5	(Turkey) Serhat Öztaşdelen	Kocaelispor	3
5	(Turkey) Muhammed Şengezer	Başakşehir	3
5	(Brazil) Paulo Victor	Alanyaspor	3

== See also ==
- 2026–27 TFF 1. Lig
- 2026–27 Turkish Cup
