= 2025–26 TFF 1. Lig =

25th season of TFF 1. Lig

TFF 1. Lig
- Season: 2025–26
- Dates: 10 August 2025 – 2 May 2026
- Champions: Erzurumspor
- Promoted: Erzurumspor; Amedspor; Çorum F.K.
- Relegated: Serikspor; Sakaryaspor; Hatayspor; Adana Demirspor
- Top goalscorer: Mbaye Diagne (29 goals)
- Biggest home win: Erzurumspor 7-0 Adana Demirspor (14 February 2026); Amedspor 7-0 Adana Demirspor (1 February 2026); Keçiörengücü 7-0 Adana Demirspor (21 March 2026); İstanbulspor 8-1 Adana Demirspor (1 May 2026)
- Biggest away win: Adana Demirspor 1-8 Amedspor (31 August 2025)
- Highest scoring: Adana Demirspor 1-8 Amedspor (31 August 2025); Adana Demirspor 2-7 Keçiörengücü (9 November 2025); İstanbulspor 8-1 Adana Demirspor (1 May 2026)
- Longest unbeaten run: Erzurumspor (15 matches)
- Longest winless run: Hatayspor (33 matches)
- Longest losing run: Adana Demirspor (10 matches)
- All statistics correct as of 1 May 2026.

The 2025–26 TFF 1. Lig was the 25th season since the league was established in 2001 and 63rd season of the second-level football league of Turkey since its establishment in 1963–64.

== Teams ==
=== Team changes ===
| Promoted to 2025–26 Süper Lig | Relegated from 2024–25 Süper Lig |
|---|---|
| Kocaelispor; Gençlerbirliği; Fatih Karagümrük | Adana Demirspor; Hatayspor; Sivasspor; Bodrum |
| Promoted from 2024–25 TFF 2. Lig | Relegated to 2025–26 TFF 2. Lig |
| Serik Belediyespor; Sarıyer; Vanspor | Yeni Malatyaspor; Adanaspor; Şanlıurfaspor; Ankaragücü |

=== Stadiums and locations ===
Location of teams in 2025–26 TFF 1. Lig
Clubs located in Istanbul

| Team | Home city/borough | Home province | Stadium | Capacity |
|---|---|---|---|---|
| Adana Demirspor | Adana | Adana | New Adana Stadium | 33,543 |
| Amedspor | Diyarbakır | Diyarbakır | Diyarbakır Stadium | 33,000 |
| Bandırmaspor | Bandırma | Balıkesir | 17 Eylül Stadium | 12,725 |
| Bodrum | Bodrum | Muğla | Bodrum District Stadium | 3,925 |
| Boluspor | Bolu | Bolu | Bolu Atatürk Stadium | 8,456 |
| Çorum | Çorum | Çorum | Çorum City Stadium | 15,000 |
| Erzurumspor | Erzurum | Erzurum | Kazım Karabekir Stadium | 21,374 |
| Esenler Erokspor | Esenler | Istanbul | Esenler Stadium | 5,296 |
| Hatayspor | Antakya (Note: Hatayspor will play their home matches in İskenderun due to Hatay Stadium in Antakya having been damaged by the 2023 Turkey–Syria earthquakes.) | Hatay | Fuat Tosyalı Stadium | 9,800 |
| Iğdır | Iğdır | Iğdır | Iğdır City Stadium | 2,700 |
| İstanbulspor | Büyükçekmece | Istanbul | Esenyurt Necmi Kadıoğlu Stadium | 7,500 |
| Keçiörengücü | Keçiören | Ankara | Ankara Aktepe Stadium | 4,883 |
| Manisa | Manisa | Manisa | Manisa 19 Mayıs Stadium | 16,066 |
| Pendikspor | Pendik | Istanbul | Pendik Stadium | 2,500 |
| Sakaryaspor | Adapazarı | Sakarya | New Sakarya Stadium | 28,154 |
| Sarıyer | Sarıyer | Istanbul | Yusuf Ziya Öniş Stadium | 4,100 |
| Serikspor | Serik | Antalya | Serik İsmail Oğan Stadium | 2,250 |
| Sivasspor | Sivas | Sivas | New Sivas 4 Eylül Stadium | 27,734 |
| Ümraniyespor | Ümraniye | Istanbul | Ümraniye Municipality City Stadium | 3,513 |
| Vanspor | Van | Van | Van Atatürk Stadium | 5,885 |

=== Managerial changes ===
Managerial changes before the season
| Team | Outgoing head coach | Reason for leaving | Leaving date | Successor | Start date |
|---|---|---|---|---|---|
| Amed | (Turkey) Servet Çetin | Mutual agreement | 20 May 2025 | (Turkey) Mehmet Altıparmak | 18 June 2025 |
| Bodrum | (Portugal) José Morais | Resignation | 30 May 2025 | (Turkey) Burhan Eşer | 29 June 2025 |
| Adana Demirspor | (Turkey) Mustafa Alper Avcı | Resignation | 31 May 2025 | (Turkey) Koray Palaz | 6 July 2025 |
| Sivasspor | (Turkey) Rıza Çalımbay | Contract expired | 3 June 2025 | (Turkey) Osman Zeki Korkmaz | 28 June 2025 |
| İstanbulspor | (Turkey) Osman Zeki Korkmaz | Resignation | 23 May 2025 | (Turkey) Mustafa Alper Avcı | 4 June 2025 |

Managerial changes during the season
| Team | Outgoing head coach | Reason for leaving | Leaving date | Successor | Start date |
|---|---|---|---|---|---|
| Adana Demirspor | (Turkey) Koray Palaz | Resignation | 23 October 2025 | (Turkey) Kubilayhan Yücel | 6 November 2025 |

=== Foreign Players ===
- Player names in **bold** indicate the player was registered during the mid-season transfer window.
- Player names in italics were out of the squad or left the club within the season, after the pre-season transfer window, or in the mid-season transfer window, and at least had one appearance.

| Team | Player 1 | Player 2 | Player 3 | Player 4 | Player 5 | Player 6 | Player 7 | U23 player | Former players |
|---|---|---|---|---|---|---|---|---|---|
| Adana Demirspor | | | | | | | | | |
| Amedspor | (Bulgaria) **Zdravko Dimitrov** | (Colombia) Daniel Moreno | (Israel) Dia Saba | (Kosovo) **Florent Hasani** | (Mali) Adama Traoré | (Senegal) Mbaye Diagne | (Ukraine) **Oleksandr Syrota** | (Ghana) Felix Afena-Gyan | (Brazil) Fernando Andrade (France) Yohan Cassubie (Gabon) André Poko (Senegal) Cheikhou Kouyaté |
| Bandırmaspor | (Benin) Cédric Hountondji | (Brazil) Douglas Tanque | (Democratic Republic of the Congo) Rémi Mulumba | (Nigeria) Tosin Kehinde | (Portugal) **João Amaral** | (Senegal) **Mamadou Fall** | | (Senegal) **Amidou Badji** | (Algeria) Billel Messaoudi (Curaçao) Leandro Bacuna (Democratic Republic of the Congo) Dieumerci Ndongala (Kosovo) Jetmir Topalli (Mali) Wilson Samaké |
| Bodrum | (Albania) Arlind Ajeti | (Albania) Omar Imeri | (Albania) Taulant Seferi | (Bosnia and Herzegovina) **Dino Hotić** | (Ghana) **Haqi Osman** | (Portugal) Diogo Sousa | (Portugal) Pedro Brazão | (Nigeria) Gabriel Obekpa | (Angola) Fredy (Bulgaria) Zdravko Dimitrov (Democratic Republic of the Congo) Jonathan Okita (Ghana) Musah Mohammed |
| Boluspor | (Albania) Dean Liço | (Angola) Mário Balbúrdia | (Bosnia and Herzegovina) **Almir Aganspahić** | (Brazil) Lucas Lima | (France) Loïc Kouagba | (Romania) **Alexandru Băluță** | | | (Guinea) Naby Oularé (Italy) Martin Boakye (Kosovo) Florent Hasani (Nigeria) Rasheed Akanbi |
| Çorum | (Angola) **Fredy** | (Bosnia and Herzegovina) Ibrahim Šehić | (Ghana) Joseph Attamah | (Paraguay) Braian Samudio | (Portugal) Pedrinho | (Senegal) **Mame Thiam** | (Serbia) Danijel Aleksić | (Ghana) **Ibrahim Zubairu** | (Angola) Geraldo (Nigeria) Emeka Eze |
| Erzurumspor | (Belgium) Brandon Baiye | (Brazil) **Fernando Andrade** | (Chile) Martín Rodríguez | (Croatia) Matija Orbanic | (Georgia (country)) Guram Giorbelidze | (Italy) Giovanni Crociata | (Mali) Cheikne Sylla | (Kosovo) Amar Gërxhaliu | (Austria) Marko Božić |
| Esenler Erokspor | (Bosnia and Herzegovina) Hamza Čataković | (Brazil) Amilton | (Gabon) Guélor Kanga | (Guadeloupe) Dimitri Cavaré | (Nigeria) Olarenwaju Kayode | (Republic of the Congo) Francis Nzaba | (Scotland) Ryan Jack | (Senegal) Mame Mor Faye | |
| Hatayspor | (Nigeria) Funsho Bamgboye | (Republic of the Congo) Chandrel Massanga | (Russia) **Rakhim Chaadaev** | (Ghana) **Sharif Osman** | (Nigeria) **Prince Ating** | | | (Nigeria) **Musa Abdulahi Danjuma** | (Bosnia and Herzegovina) Armin Hodžić (Bosnia and Herzegovina) Visar Bekaj (Cameroon) Guy Kilama (Nigeria) Jonathan Okoronkwo (Portugal) Rui Pedro (Sweden) Carlos Strandberg |
| Iğdır | (Belgium) Gianni Bruno | (Brazil) **Wenderson Tsunami** | (Cape Verde) Ryan Mendes | (Curaçao) **Leandro Bacuna** | (Guinea) Bengali-Fodé Koita | (Ivory Coast) Moryké Fofana | (Kosovo) **Florian Loshaj** | (Ivory Coast) **Marius Trésor Doh** | (Costa Rica) Aarón Suárez (France) Valentin Eysseric (Guinea) Antoine Conte (North Macedonia) Daniel Avramovski (North Macedonia) Valon Ethemi (Romania) Dorin Rotariu (Senegal) Moustapha Camara |
| İstanbulspor | (Brazil) **Phellipe Cardoso** | (England) Demeaco Duhaney | (Gabon) David Sambissa | (The Gambia) Alieu Cham | (Lithuania) Modestas Vorobjovas | (North Macedonia) Mario Krstovski | (Senegal) Mendy Mamadou | (The Gambia) **Elvin Mendy** | (Bosnia and Herzegovina) Florian Loshaj (Nigeria) Michael Ologo |
| Keçiörengücü | (Albania) Eduart Rroca | (Albania) Odise Roshi | (Brazil) Wellington | (Chile) Junior Fernandes | (Mozambique) Mexer | (Nigeria) Francis Ezeh | (Senegal) Mame Biram Diouf | (Guinea) **Ousmane Djabi** | (Ghana) Haqi Osman (Ghana) Joseph Ofori |
| Manisa | (France) Loïs Diony | (Mali) Birama Touré | (Morocco) Yassine Benrahou | (Martinique) Christophe Hérelle | (Netherlands) Bobby Adekanye | (Norway) Jonathan Lindseth | (Senegal) Mamadou Cissokho | (Honduras) **Alenis Vargas** | |
| Pendikspor | (Brazil) Thuram | (Croatia) Vinko Soldo | (England) Mallik Wilks | (Greece) Stelios Kitsiou | (Jamaica) Jonson Clarke-Harris | (Portugal) Nuno Sequeira | (Serbia) Đorđe Denić | | |
| Sakaryaspor | (Brazil) **Ruan** | (Croatia) Josip Vuković | (Ghana) **Owusu Kwabena** | (Ivory Coast) **Ismaila Soro** | (Peru) **Sergio Peña** | (Poland) Jakub Szumski | (Poland) Łukasz Zwoliński | (Ivory Coast) **Mohamed Fofana** | (Bosnia and Herzegovina) Rijad Kobiljar (Bulgaria) Atanas Kabov (Canada) Umechi Akuazaoku (Democratic Republic of the Congo) Gaël Kakuta (France) Wissam Ben Yedder (Greece) Dimitrios Kolovetsios |
| Sarıyer | (Angola) **Marcos Silva** | (Bosnia and Herzegovina) **Enver Kulašin** | (France) Malaly Dembélé | (Gabon) **André Poko** | (Mali) Hamidou Traoré | (Nigeria) **Emeka Eze** | (Senegal) Khouma Babacar | (Senegal) Moustapha Camara | (Central African Republic) Axel Urie (France) Julien Anziani (Morocco) Adrien Regattin (Senegal) Papy Djilobodji |
| Serikspor | (Bosnia and Herzegovina) **Jetmir Topalli** | (Mexico) **Alán Montes** | (Nigeria) **Christian Nwachukwu** | (Nigeria) **Joseph Okoro** | (Nigeria) **Raymond Adeola** | (Poland) **Michał Nalepa** | (Russia) Ilya Sadygov | (Belarus) Aleksandr Martynov | (Angola) Marcos Silva (Ivory Coast) **Rayan-Elie Guibero** (North Macedonia) **Gjoko Spasov** (Portugal) João Amaral (Russia) Artyom Yuran (Russia) Dmitry Tikhy (Russia) Ilya Berkovsky (Russia) Kirill Gotsuk |
| Sivasspor | (Albania) **Rey Manaj** | (Gabon) Aaron Appindangoyé | (Greece) Charis Charisis | (Mali) Aly Mallé | (North Macedonia) Daniel Avramovski | (North Macedonia) Valon Ethemi | (Senegal) Aliou Badji | (Nigeria) **Jonathan Okoronkwo** | (Brazil) Luan Campos (Democratic Republic of the Congo) Samuel Moutoussamy (England) Alex Pritchard (Serbia) Veljko Simić (Sweden) Benjamin Kimpioka |
| Ümraniyespor | (Albania) Jurgen Bardhi | (Benin) Cebio Soukou | (Bosnia and Herzegovina) Andrej Đokanović | (Croatia) Tomislav Glumac | (Kosovo) Engjëll Hoti | (Portugal) Bernardo Sousa | | (Nigeria) Toheeb Adeola | |
| Vanspor | (Brazil) Jefferson Júnior | (Cameroon) Iván Cédric | (Finland) **Santeri Hostikka** | (France) Aliou Traoré | (Nigeria) **Kenneth Mamah** | (Slovenia) Žan Jevšenak | (Spain) Francesc Regis | (Guinea) Naby Oularé | (Brazil) Lucas Áfrico (Greece) Anestis Vlachomitros (Spain) Benito Ramírez |

== League table ==
| Pos | Team | Pld | W | D | L | GF | GA | GD | Pts | Qualification or relegation |
|---|---|---|---|---|---|---|---|---|---|---|
| 1 | Erzurumspor (C, P) | 38 | 23 | 12 | 3 | 82 | 27 | +55 | 81 | Promotion to the Süper Lig |
| 2 | Amedspor (P) | 38 | 21 | 11 | 6 | 81 | 42 | +39 | 74 | Promotion to the Süper Lig |
| 3 | Esenler Erokspor | 38 | 21 | 11 | 6 | 81 | 35 | +46 | 74 | Qualification for the Süper Lig Playoff Final |
| 4 | Çorum (P) | 38 | 21 | 8 | 9 | 63 | 39 | +24 | 71 | Qualification for the Süper Lig Playoff Quarter Finals |
| 5 | Bodrumspor | 38 | 18 | 10 | 10 | 71 | 39 | +32 | 64 | Qualification for the Süper Lig Playoff Quarter Finals |
| 6 | Pendikspor | 38 | 16 | 15 | 7 | 58 | 33 | +25 | 63 | Qualification for the Süper Lig Playoff Quarter Finals |
| 7 | Keçiörengücü | 38 | 16 | 12 | 10 | 73 | 43 | +30 | 60 | Qualification for the Süper Lig Playoff Quarter Finals |
| 8 | Bandırmaspor | 38 | 16 | 12 | 10 | 47 | 34 | +13 | 60 | |
| 9 | Manisa | 38 | 16 | 7 | 15 | 57 | 56 | +1 | 55 | |
| 10 | Sivasspor | 38 | 14 | 11 | 13 | 47 | 43 | +4 | 53 | |
| 11 | İstanbulspor | 38 | 13 | 13 | 12 | 57 | 55 | +2 | 52 | |
| 12 | Sarıyer | 38 | 15 | 7 | 16 | 44 | 44 | 0 | 52 | |
| 13 | Iğdır | 38 | 13 | 11 | 14 | 52 | 54 | −2 | 50 | |
| 14 | Vanspor | 38 | 13 | 10 | 15 | 52 | 47 | +5 | 49 | |
| 15 | Boluspor | 38 | 14 | 6 | 18 | 61 | 57 | +4 | 48 | |
| 16 | Ümraniyespor | 38 | 13 | 7 | 18 | 47 | 51 | −4 | 46 | |
| 17 | Serikspor (R) | 38 | 11 | 6 | 21 | 44 | 75 | −31 | 39 | Relegation to the TFF 2. Lig |
| 18 | Sakaryaspor (R) | 38 | 8 | 10 | 20 | 45 | 72 | −27 | 34 | Relegation to the TFF 2. Lig |
| 19 | Hatayspor (R) | 38 | 2 | 8 | 28 | 33 | 102 | −69 | 14 | Relegation to the TFF 2. Lig |
| 20 | Adana Demirspor (Note: Adana Demirspor were deducted 63 points.) (R) | 38 | 1 | 3 | 34 | 22 | 169 | −147 | −57 | Relegation to the TFF 2. Lig |

Source: TFF
Rules for classification: 1) Points; 2) Head-to-head points; 3) Head-to-head goal difference; 4) Head-to-head goals scored; 5) Goal difference; 6) Goals scored; 7) Play-off.
(C) Champions; (P) Promoted; (R) Relegated

== Results ==
| Home \ Away | ADA | AME | BAN | BOD | BOL | ÇOR | ESE | ERZ | HAT | İST | IĞD | KEÇ | MAN | PEN | SAK | SAR | SER | SİV | ÜMR | VAN |
|---|---|---|---|---|---|---|---|---|---|---|---|---|---|---|---|---|---|---|---|---|
| Adana Demirspor | | 1–8 | 0–3 | 0–5 | 1–6 | 0–3 | 0–5 | 0–3 | 3–3 | 1–5 | 1–6 | 2–7 | 2–1 | 0–5 | 0–6 | 0–3 | 1–4 | 1–1 | 1–3 | 2–4 |
| Amedspor | 7–0 | | 2–1 | 1–1 | 6–1 | 1–0 | 2–1 | 2–2 | 2–1 | 0–0 | 3–0 | 4–1 | 2–0 | 2–1 | 1–1 | 2–0 | 1–0 | 4–2 | 2–2 | 1–0 |
| Bandırmaspor | 4–0 | 2–0 | | 2–0 | 1–0 | 1–0 | 0–0 | 0–2 | 4–0 | 1–0 | 0–0 | 1–1 | 1–4 | 4–1 | 1–1 | 0–0 | 0–3 | 1–0 | 2–1 | 2–0 |
| Bodrum | 3–1 | 0–0 | 0–0 | | 2–0 | 4–0 | 3–4 | 1–1 | 5–0 | 5–0 | 2–0 | 4–3 | 1–2 | 1–1 | 3–1 | 1–0 | 3–0 | 1–2 | 1–0 | 2–0 |
| Boluspor | 6–0 | 4–1 | 0–0 | 3–0 | | 1–2 | 1–3 | 2–0 | 3–1 | 0–1 | 2–0 | 2–1 | 2–0 | 1–2 | 2–0 | 1–2 | 3–1 | 1–2 | 0–1 | 2–3 |
| Çorum | 4–1 | 2–0 | 0–1 | 1–1 | 0–0 | | 2–1 | 1–1 | 3–1 | 2–3 | 3–1 | 1–0 | 3–1 | 2–0 | 2–0 | 2–1 | 1–1 | 3–1 | 2–0 | 0–0 |
| Esenler Erokspor | 2–2 | 1–1 | 1–1 | 1–1 | 2–0 | 3–1 | | 0–2 | 4–1 | 5–0 | 2–3 | 1–0 | 3–1 | 1–1 | 4–1 | 1–1 | 5–0 | 2–1 | 1–0 | 0–0 |
| Erzurumspor | 7–0 | 2–0 | 1–1 | 2–2 | 2–0 | 1–0 | 1–1 | | 3–0 | 4–0 | 2–1 | 1–1 | 8–1 | 3–3 | 1–1 | 4–0 | 4–0 | 2–0 | 2–0 | 1–1 |
| Hatayspor | 4–0 | 0–3 | 0–3 | 1–3 | 2–2 | 1–4 | 0–5 | 0–3 | | 1–1 | 0–2 | 1–3 | 2–2 | 0–1 | 1–1 | 0–3 | 1–1 | 1–2 | 0–2 | 3–1 |
| İstanbulspor | 8–1 | 0–4 | 1–1 | 0–1 | 1–1 | 3–1 | 1–4 | 0–1 | 1–0 | | 1–2 | 2–2 | 1–1 | 0–0 | 3–3 | 3–1 | 0–0 | 2–1 | 4–0 | 1–3 |
| Iğdır | 4–1 | 3–3 | 1–1 | 2–3 | 1–1 | 0–2 | 0–3 | 2–1 | 4–2 | 2–1 | | 0–1 | 0–0 | 1–1 | 1–0 | 2–1 | 1–2 | 1–1 | 1–1 | 0–0 |
| Keçiörengücü | 7–0 | 2–2 | 3–1 | 2–1 | 5–1 | 1–2 | 1–1 | 1–2 | 5–0 | 0–0 | 1–2 | | 2–1 | 0–0 | 1–1 | 3–0 | 0–0 | 0–0 | 3–1 | 3–0 |
| Manisa | 5–0 | 0–3 | 3–2 | 0–4 | 4–1 | 0–1 | 3–4 | 1–1 | 2–1 | 1–0 | 1–1 | 2–2 | | 2–0 | 5–0 | 3–0 | 1–0 | 0–1 | 1–0 | 2–1 |
| Pendikspor | 3–0 | 0–2 | 2–0 | 0–0 | 2–0 | 1–1 | 0–0 | 1–2 | 4–1 | 1–1 | 1–1 | 0–1 | 2–0 | | 4–1 | 2–0 | 4–0 | 2–1 | 3–0 | 1–1 |
| Sakaryaspor | 4–0 | 2–1 | 1–1 | 0–2 | 1–4 | 0–4 | 1–2 | 0–1 | 3–0 | 2–2 | 3–2 | 1–0 | 0–2 | 0–2 | | 0–0 | 2–3 | 0–3 | 1–1 | 2–1 |
| Sarıyer | 5–0 | 1–1 | 1–0 | 1–0 | 1–1 | 1–2 | 1–0 | 0–2 | 4–0 | 1–2 | 1–0 | 3–1 | 0–0 | 0–2 | 1–2 | | 3–0 | 1–0 | 1–2 | 2–1 |
| Serikspor | 4–0 | 1–2 | 1–0 | 2–4 | 1–4 | 2–3 | 0–3 | 1–1 | 4–2 | 0–3 | 1–3 | 1–3 | 0–1 | 3–4 | 2–0 | 3–0 | | 0–1 | 1–0 | 1–6 |
| Sivasspor | 5–0 | 1–1 | 2–0 | 1–1 | 1–0 | 1–1 | 1–3 | 0–2 | 1–1 | 1–3 | 2–1 | 0–1 | 3–2 | 0–0 | 4–1 | 1–0 | 0–0 | | 1–0 | 3–3 |
| Ümraniyespor | 5–0 | 3–4 | 1–2 | 1–0 | 4–2 | 1–1 | 0–2 | 3–1 | 1–1 | 0–0 | 0–1 | 1–4 | 2–1 | 0–0 | 2–0 | 1–3 | 5–0 | 1–0 | | 1–2 |
| Vanspor | 1–0 | 3–0 | 1–2 | 3–1 | 0–1 | 3–1 | 1–0 | 0–3 | 4–0 | 1–3 | 3–0 | 1–1 | 1–2 | 1–1 | 3–2 | 0–0 | 0–1 | 0–0 | 0–1 | |

Source: TFF
Legend: Blue = home team win; Yellow = draw; Red = away team win.

== Promotion Playoffs ==
=== Bracket ===
Quarter-finals
4 | Çorum | 1
7 | Keçiörengücü | 0
5 | Bodrum | 2
6 | Pendikspor | 0

Semi-finals
4 | Çorum (a.e.t.) | 0 | 2 | 2
5 | Bodrum | 1 | 0 | 1

Final
3 | Esenler Erokspor | 0
4 | Çorum | 2

== Statistics ==
=== Top scorers ===
As of 24 May 2026

| Rank | Player | Club(s) | Goals |
|---|---|---|---|
| 1 | (Senegal) Mbaye Diagne | Amed | 29 |
| 2 | (Turkey) Eren Tozlu | Erzurum | 23 |
| 3 | (France) Loïs Diony | Manisa | 22 |
| 4 | (Kosovo) Florent Hasani | Boluspor, Amed | 18 |
| 5 | (Senegal) Mame Biram Diouf | Keçiörengücü | 18 |
| 5 | (Nigeria) Olarenwaju Kayode | Erokspor | 18 |
| 7 | (Belgium) Gianni Bruno | Iğdır | 16 |
| 7 | (Albania) Taulant Seferi | Bodrum | 16 |
| 9 | (Turkey) Doğan Can Davas | Boluspor | 15 |
| 9 | (Cameroon) Iván Cédric | Van | 15 |
| 11 | (Angola) Fredy | Bodrum, Çorum | 14 |
| 11 | (Bosnia and Herzegovina) Hamza Čataković | Erokspor | 14 |
