= 2025–26 Adana Demirspor season =

Adana Demirspor
2025–26 season
- Owner: Murat Sancak
- President: Bedirhan Durak (Until 1 September 2025); Ali Sancak
- Manager: Koray Palaz (5 July 2025-23 October 2025); Hilmi Bozkurt (caretaker, 23 October–8 November 2025); Kubilayhan Yücel (from 29 November)
- Stadium: New Adana Stadium
- TFF 1. Lig: 20th
- Turkish Cup: Second round
- All statistics correct as of 25 November 2025.

The 2025–26 season is the 32nd season in the TFF 1. League of the history of Adana Demirspor, and the 86th year since the club's foundation.

== Season summary ==
=== Pre-season ===
Adana Demirspor concluded the 2024–25 season in the lowest position in the Super League, resulting in their relegation to the First League after four seasons. The financial crisis that began in the mid-season break of the 2023–24 season persisted into the 2024–25 season, resulting in penalties from FIFA and UEFA due to outstanding debts.

The 2025–26 season also commenced in a period of uncertainty for Adana Demirspor. The majority of players of the last season have transferred to various clubs. On 5 July 2025, it was announced that Koray Palaz had been appointed as head coach and the team began training with a squad with youth players.

Before the first week of the season, the team has been fined a six-point deduction from FIFA due to cases opened during Murat Sancak era.

=== Season ===
Adana Demirspor had not earned any points in the three matches played prior to the international break. Following this, the team was subject to a further six-point deduction from FIFA, reducing the team's points total to −11. Subsequently, on 17 September 2025, a further six-point deduction was imposed, bringing the team's points total to −17.

Adana Demirspor continued to experience setbacks in subsequent matches, and head coach Koray Palaz resigned after the Sakaryaspor match. Caretaker Hilmi Bozkurt was responsible for leading the team during the Vanspor and Serikspor games. Despite rumours on various social media accounts and in the local media before both matches that the team would withdraw from the league, these claims did not realise.

Prior to the Keçiörengücü game in match-week 13, Kubilayhan Yücel was announced as the new coach.

== Current squad ==
As of 30 September 2025

Note: Flags indicate national team as defined under FIFA eligibility rules; some limited exceptions apply. Players may hold more than one non-FIFA nationality.

No.	Pos.	Nation	Player
1	GK	TUR	Mustafa Yiğit Durmaz
2	DF	TUR	Enes Demirtaş
4	DF	TUR	Aslan Atay
6	MF	TUR	Caner Kaban
7	FW	TUR	Sefa Gülay
8	MF	TUR	Barış Timur
16	MF	TUR	Kürşat Türkeş Küçük
17	DF	TUR	Mert Menemencioğlu
18	FW	TUR	Ahmet Bolat
20	FW	TUR	Ahmet Arda Birinci
21	DF	TUR	Kadir Karayiğit
22	FW	TUR	Gökdeniz Tunç
23	DF	TUR	Yusuf Demirkıran

No.	Pos.	Nation	Player
24	DF	TUR	Aykut Sarıkaya
25	GK	TUR	Murat Eser
28	FW	TUR	Salih Kavrazlı (captain)
30	DF	TUR	Yücel Gürol
43	DF	TUR	Ali Fidan
61	DF	TUR	Ali Arda Yıldız
66	MF	TUR	Halil Eray Aktaş
70	MF	TUR	Enes Erol
73	FW	TUR	Samet Akif Duyur
77	FW	TUR	Osman Kaynak
80	MF	TUR	Ahmet Yılmaz
87	MF	TUR	Ulaş İmergi
88	MF	TUR	Kayra Saygan
