= Yakup Kırtay =

Turkish association football player (born 2003)

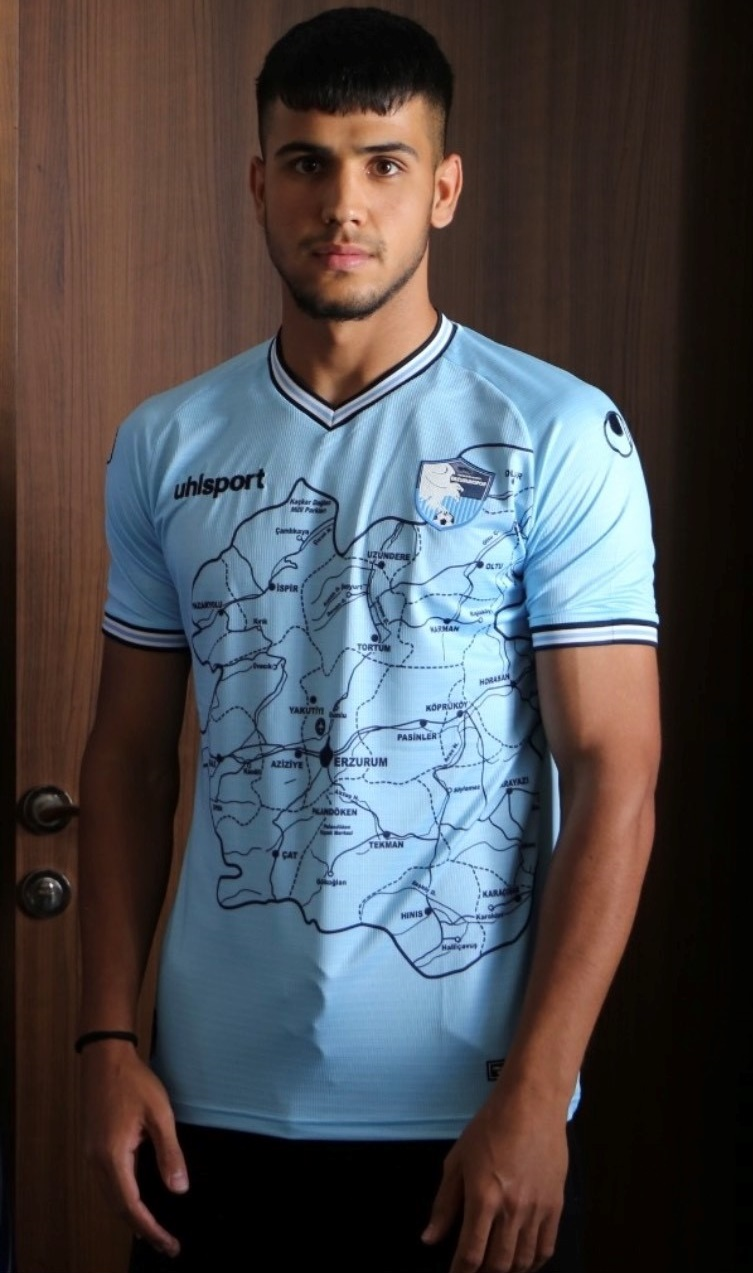

Personal information
- Date of birth: 16 July 2003 (age 23)
- Place of birth: Patnos, Ağrı, Turkey
- Height: 1.87 m (6 ft 1 1/2 in)
- Position: Centre back

Team information
- Current team: Erzurumspor
- Number: 3

Youth career
- 2016: Patnos Gençlikspor
- 2017–2022: BB Erzurumspor

Senior career*
Years	Team	Apps	(Gls)
2022–	Erzurumspor	93	(4)
- * Club domestic league appearances and goals as of 5 May 2026

Yakup Kırtay (born 16 July 2003) is a Turkish professional footballer who plays as a centre back for TFF First League club Erzurumspor.

== Professional career ==
Kırtay was born in Patnos, Ağrı Province. He lost his father in a traffic accident when he was two years old. He began playing football at the age of 11 after persuading his mother to allow him to join the Fenerbahçe Football School. He later played amateur football in his hometown before being noticed during regional youth trials in Erzurum at the age of 13. Kırtay made his professional debut for Erzurumspor in a 4–0 TFF First League loss against Denizlispor on 20 May 2022. He scored his first TFF First League goal in a 2–1 home defeat to Manisa FK, scoring Erzurumspor FK’s only goal of the match on 25 August 2023.

In 2025–26 season, he won the TFF First League championship with Erzurumspor.

== Honours ==
Erzurumspor FK

- TFF 1. Lig: 2025–26
