= Benhur Keser =

Turkish footballer (born 1996)

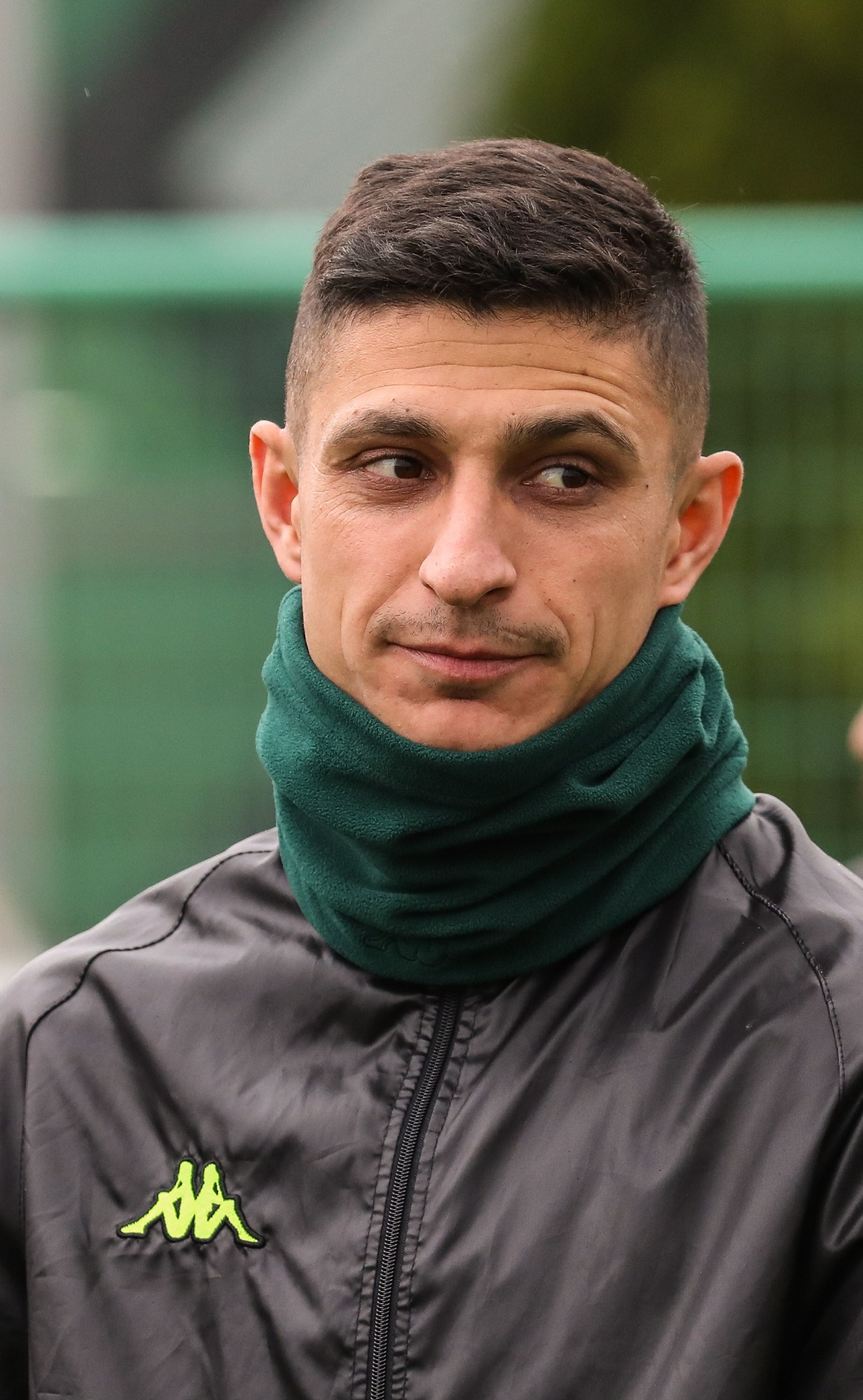
- Keser in 2022

Personal information
- Date of birth: 29 October 1996 (age 30)
- Place of birth: Kocasinan, Turkey
- Height: 1.85 m (6 ft 1 in)
- Position: Winger

Team information
- Current team: Kayserispor
- Number: 10

Youth career
- 2007–2016: Kayserispor

Senior career*
Years	Team	Apps	(Gls)
2016–2018	Bayrampaşaspor	56	(14)
2018–2019	Şanlıurfaspor	33	(3)
2019–2021	Bandırmaspor	28	(6)
2020–2021	→ Kocaelispor (loan)	34	(13)
2021–2022	Kocaelispor	30	(6)
2022–2026	Çaykur Rizespor	63	(11)
2025	→ Esenler Erokspor (loan)	11	(1)
2025	→ Erzurumspor (loan)	35	(8)
2026–	Kayserispor	0	(0)
- * Club domestic league appearances and goals as of 5 May 2026

Benhur Keser (born 29 October 1996) is a Turkish professional footballer who plays as a winger for TFF First League club Kayserispor.

== Career ==
Keser is a youth product of Kayserispor, and began his senior career with Bayrampaşaspor in 2016. In his second season with them, they won the TFF Third League. On 29 June 2018, he moved to Şanlıurfaspor on a three-year contract. The next year on 26 July 2019, he moved to Bandırmaspor on a two-year contract. On 6 October 2020, he moved to Kocaelispor on a season long loan where he eventually was named captain. He signed permanently with Kocaelispor for the following season, 2021–22. He On 8 July 2022, he transferred to Çaykur Rizespor on a four-year contract in the TFF First League. He helped the club come second in the 2023–24 TFF First League, earning promotion to the Süper Lig for the first time in his career.

== Personal life ==
Keser studied in the Faculty of Physical Education at the Erciyes University. He is married and has a daughter.

== Honours ==
Bayrampaşaspor

- TFF Third League: 2017–18
