= Orhan Ovacıklı =

Turkish footballer

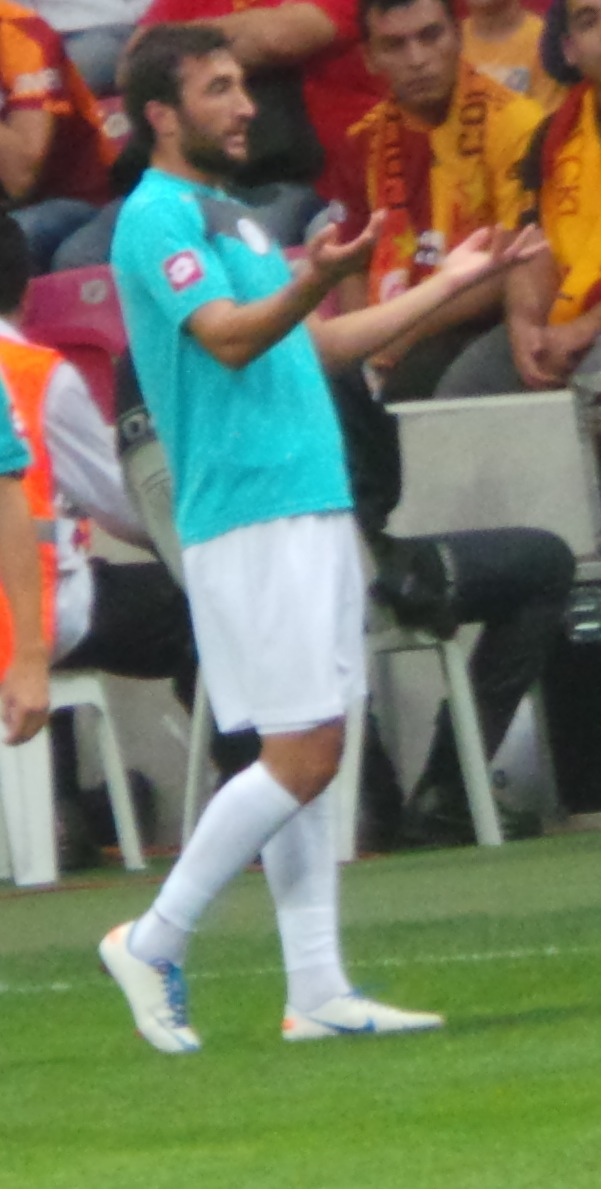

Personal information
- Date of birth: 23 November 1988 (age 37)
- Place of birth: İzmir, Turkey
- Height: 1.79 m (5 ft 10 1/2 in)
- Position: Right back

Team information
- Current team: Erzurumspor
- Number: 53

Youth career
- 2001–2007: Karşıyaka
- 2007–2009: Bigaspor

Senior career*
Years	Team	Apps	(Gls)
2009–2012	Bandırmaspor	92	(2)
2012–2020	Çaykur Rizespor	183	(1)
2020–2021	Bandırmaspor	24	(2)
2021–	Erzurumspor	174	(3)
- * Club domestic league appearances and goals as of 5 May 2026

Orhan Ovacıklı (born 23 November 1988) is a Turkish professional footballer who plays as a right back for TFF First League club Erzurumspor.
