= Sefa Akgün =

Turkish footballer (born 2000)

Personal information
- Date of birth: June 30, 2000 (age 26)
- Place of birth: Araklı, Turkey
- Height: 1.74 m (5 ft 9 in)
- Position: Midfielder

Team information
- Current team: Erzurumspor
- Number: 8

Youth career
- 2012–2018: Trabzonspor

Senior career*
| Years | Team | Apps | (Gls) |
| 2018– | Erzurumspor | 111 | (3) |
| 2020 | → Kırşehir FK (loan) | 10 | (0) |
| 2020–2022 | → 24 Erzincanspor (loan) | 63 | (6) |

International career
| 2015 | Turkey U15 | 7 | (1) |
| 2015–2016 | Turkey U16 | 15 | (1) |
| 2016–2017 | Turkey U17 | 23 | (1) |
| 2017–2018 | Turkey U18 | 11 | (1) |
| 2018–2019 | Turkey U19 | 7 | (0) |
| 2019 | Turkey U20 | 1 | (0) |
- * Club domestic league appearances and goals as of 5 May 2026

Sefa Akgün (born 30 June 2000) is a Turkish professional footballer who plays as a midfielder for Erzurumspor.

== Professional career ==
A youth product of Trabzonspor, signed with Erzurumspor F.K. on 4 July 2018. Akgün made his professional debut with Erzurumspor F.K. in a 2-0 Süper Lig win over Kayserispor on 26 May 2019.

== International career ==
Akgün represented the Turkey U17s at the 2017 UEFA European Under-17 Championship and 2017 FIFA U-17 World Cup.
