= Giovanni Crociata =

Italian footballer

Personal information
- Date of birth: 11 August 1997 (age 29)
- Place of birth: Palermo, Italy
- Height: 1.74 m (5 ft 8 1/2 in)
- Position: Midfielder

Team information
- Current team: Iğdır
- Number: 24

Senior career*
| Years | Team | Apps | (Gls) |
| 2016–2017 | AC Milan | 0 | (0) |
| 2016–2017 | → Brescia (loan) | 19 | (1) |
| 2017–2021 | Crotone | 48 | (6) |
| 2019 | → Carpi (loan) | 9 | (1) |
| 2021 | → Empoli (loan) | 12 | (0) |
| 2021–2023 | Empoli | 1 | (0) |
| 2021–2022 | → SPAL (loan) | 24 | (0) |
| 2022–2023 | → Südtirol (loan) | 5 | (0) |
| 2023 | → Cittadella (loan) | 16 | (6) |
| 2023–2024 | Lecco | 36 | (2) |
| 2024–2026 | Erzurumspor | 61 | (6) |
| 2026– | Iğdır | 10 | (2) |

International career
| 2013–2015 | Italy U17 | 3 | (2) |
| 2015 | Italy U18 | 1 | (0) |
- * Club domestic league appearances and goals as of 14 October 2026

Giovanni Crociata (born 11 August 1997) is an Italian professional footballer who plays as a midfielder for Turkish TFF 1. Lig club Iğdır.

== Club career ==
On 20 January 2021, he joined Empoli on loan. Empoli were obligated to purchase his rights in case of promotion to Serie A. Empoli was promoted at the end of the season.

On 31 August 2021 he joined SPAL on a season-long loan.

On 1 September 2022, Crociata was loaned to Südtirol for the season. On 10 January 2023, he was sent on a new loan to Cittadella.

On 1 September 2023, Crociata moved to Lecco in Serie B. Following Lecco's relegation, Crociata's contract was terminated by mutual consent.

== Career statistics ==
=== Club ===
Updated 15 August 2021

| Club | League | Season | League | | Cup | | Europe | | Other | | Total | |
| Club | League | Season | Apps | Goals | Apps | Goals | Apps | Goals | Apps | Goals | Apps | Goals |
|---|---|---|---|---|---|---|---|---|---|---|---|---|
| Brescia (loan) | Serie B | 2016–17 | 19 | 1 | 0 | 0 | – | | – | | 19 | 1 |
| Crotone | Serie A | 2017–18 | 11 | 1 | 1 | 0 | – | | – | | 12 | 1 |
| Crotone | Serie B | 2018–19 | 5 | 0 | 1 | 0 | – | | – | | 6 | 0 |
| Crotone | Serie B | 2019–20 | 30 | 5 | 0 | 0 | – | | – | | 30 | 5 |
| Crotone | Serie A | 2020–21 | 2 | 0 | 1 | 0 | – | | – | | 3 | 0 |
| Crotone | Total | | 48 | 6 | 3 | 0 | – | | – | | 51 | 6 |
| Carpi (loan) | Serie B | 2018–19 | 9 | 1 | 0 | 0 | – | | – | | 9 | 1 |
| Empoli | Serie B | 2020–21 | 12 | 0 | 0 | 0 | – | | – | | 12 | 0 |
| Empoli | 2021–22 | Serie A | 0 | 0 | 1 | 1 | – | | – | | 1 | 1 |
| Empoli | Total | | 12 | 0 | 1 | 1 | – | | – | | 13 | 1 |
| Career total | | | 88 | 8 | 4 | 1 | – | | – | | 92 | 9 |
