= Enver Kulašin =

Bosnian association football player (born 2003)

Personal information
- Full name: Enver Kulašin
- Date of birth: 11 September 2003 (age 23)
- Place of birth: Travnik, Bosnia and Herzegovina
- Height: 1.68 m (5 ft 6 in)
- Position: Winger

Team information
- Current team: Sarıyerspor (on loan from Gaziantep)
- Number: 27

Youth career
- 2019–2021: Željezničar

Senior career*
| Years | Team | Apps | (Gls) |
| 2022–2025 | Borac Banja Luka | 91 | (16) |
| 2025– | Gaziantep | 5 | (0) |
| 2026- | → Sarıyerspor (loan) | 14 | (1) |

International career^{‡}
| 2023–2024 | Bosnia and Herzegovina U21 | 15 | (1) |
| 2025– | Bosnia and Herzegovina | 1 | (0) |
- * Club domestic league appearances and goals as of 6 May 2026 ‡ National team caps and goals as of 10 June 2025

Enver Kulašin (born 11 September 2003) is a Bosnian professional footballer who plays as a winger for Sarıyerspor on loan from Gaziantep.

== International career ==
He is a former Bosnia and Herzegovina U21 international.

In October 2024, he was called up to the senior Bosnia and Herzegovina squad for the 2024–25 UEFA Nations League A matches against Germany and Hungary on 11 and 14 October 2024. He made his international debut in a friendly match against Slovenia on 10 June 2025.

== Career statistics ==
=== International ===
As of match played 10 June 2025

Appearances and goals by national team and year
| National team | Year | Apps | Goals |
|---|---|---|---|
Bosnia and Herzegovina
| Bosnia and Herzegovina | 2025 | 1 | 0 |
| Total | | 1 | 0 |
