= Serkan Özbalta =

Turkish footballer and manager

Personal information
- Date of birth: 5 February 1979 (age 47)
- Place of birth: Of, Turkey
- Position: Midfielder

Team information
- Current team: Erzurumspor (head coach)

Youth career
- Gençlerbirliği

Senior career*
Years	Team	Apps	(Gls)
1998–1999	Erzincanspor		
1999–2002	Altay		
1999–2000	→Mersin İY (loan)		
2000–2001	→Keskinspor (loan)		
2001–2002	→Seyhan Belediyespor (loan)		
2002–2003	Gümüşhanespor		
2003–2004	Kayseri Erciyesspor		
2004–2005	Ünyespor		
2005–2006	Maltepespor		
2006	Kahramanmaraşspor		
2006–2007	Giresunspor		
2007–2008	24 Erzincanspor		
2008	Bağlumspor		
2008–2009	Maltepespor		
2009–2010	Ofspor		
2010–2011	Bugsaşspor		

Managerial career
- 2018–2020: Keçiörengücü
- 2020–2021: Manisa
- 2022: Altay
- 2022: Hatayspor
- 2022–2023: Sakaryaspor
- 2023–2025: Çorum
- 2025–: Erzurumspor
- * Club domestic league appearances and goals

Serkan Özbalta (born 5 February 1979) is a Turkish football manager and former player who is currently serving as the head coach of Erzurumspor.

== Career ==
A youth product of Gençlerbirliği, Özbalta began his senior career with Erzincanspor in 1998, and transferred to Altay in 1999. He went on loan to Mersin İY, Keskinspor, and Seyhan Belediyespor to start his career. He spent the rest of his career in various pro and semi-pro teams in the second and third divisions of Turkey.

After retiring as a player, Özbalta began managing with Ankara Keçiörengücü in the TFF Second League, and in his debut season got them promoted to the TFF First League without losing a match at home. He moved to Manisa in the Second League in 2020, and again promoted the team to the TFF First League with an undefeated title and goal records. On 27 January 2022, he signed as the manager for his former club Altay in the Turkish Süper Lig.

On 10 October 2022, Özbalta was hired by Sakaryaspor in the TFF First League.

== Honours ==
Ankara Keçiörengücü

- TFF Second League: 2018–19

Manisa FK

- TFF Second League: 2020–21
