= Dean Liço =

Albanian footballer

Personal information
- Date of birth: 8 February 2000 (age 26)
- Place of birth: Korçë, Albania
- Height: 1.89 m (6 ft 2 in)
- Position: Midfielder

Team information
- Current team: Bandırmaspor
- Number: 8

Youth career
- –2017: Skënderbeu
- 2017–2019: Leganés B
- 2019: → Sporting (loan)
- 2020: Lazio

Senior career*
Years	Team	Apps	(Gls)
2020–2022	Ascoli	3	(0)
2021–2022	→ Partizani Tirana (loan)	9	(0)
2022–2024	Skënderbeu	59	(11)
2024–2025	Iğdır	16	(3)
2025–2026	Boluspor	48	(5)
2026–	Bandırmaspor	0	(0)

International career^{‡}
2016	Albania U17	4	(0)
2020	Albania U21	1	(0)
- * Club domestic league appearances and goals as of 6 May 2026 ‡ National team caps and goals as of 13 November 2020

Dean Liço (born 8 February 2000) is an Albanian football player who plays for Bandırmaspor in TFF First League.

== Club career ==
On 22 September 2020, he signed a multi-year contract with Italian Serie B club Ascoli. He made his Serie B debut for Ascoli on 24 October 2020 in a game against Salernitana. He substituted Abdelhamid Sabiri at half-time.

On 5 September 2021, he was loaned to Partizani Tirana.

On 13 July 2022, he has been released by the club.
