= Diyarbakır Stadium =

Football stadium in Diyarbakır, Turkey

Coordinates: 37°56′33″N 40°7′13″E

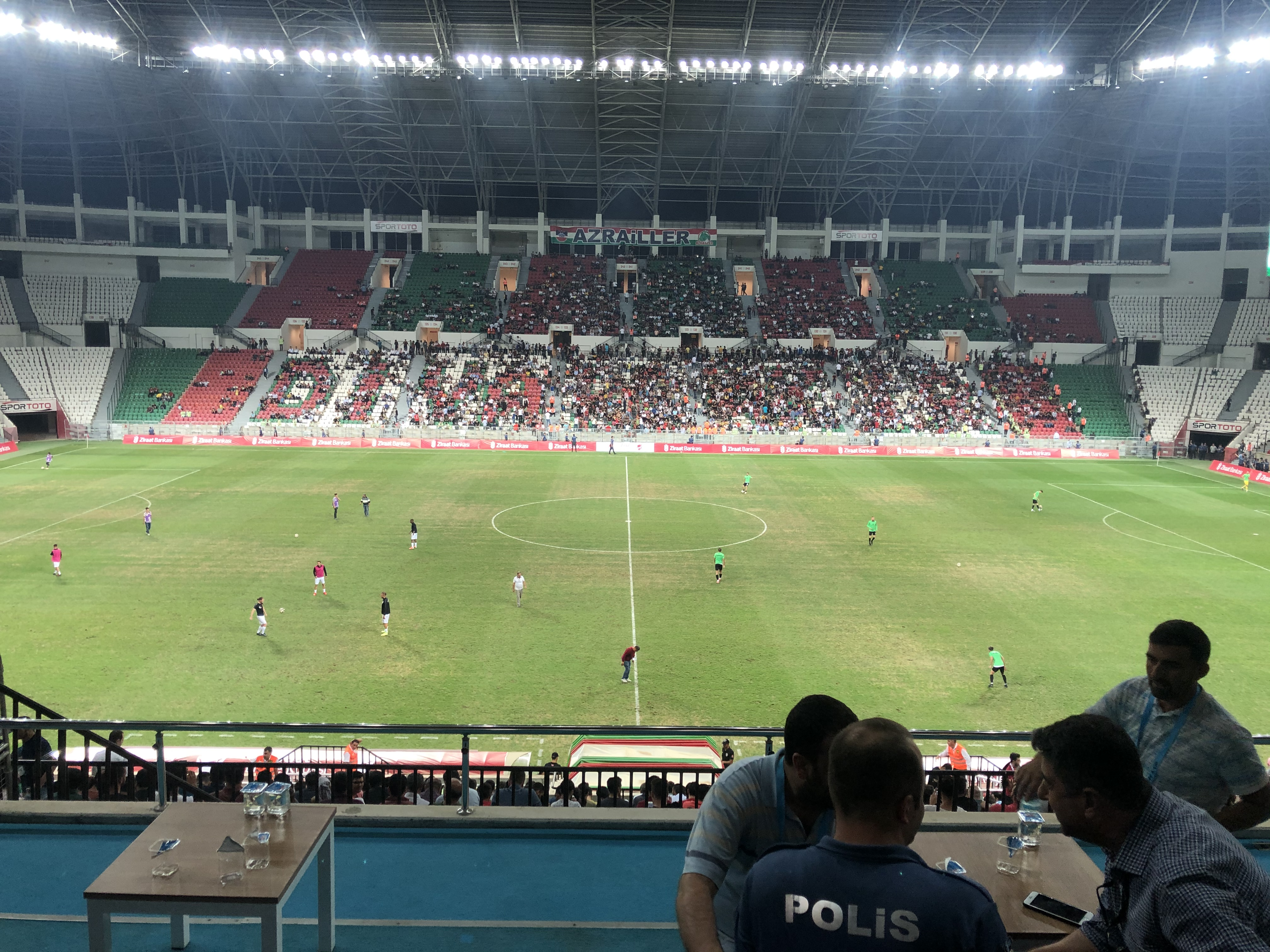

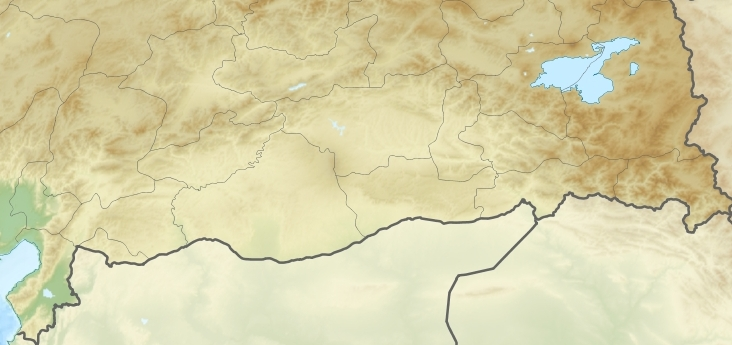
- Location in Southeastern Turkey Location in Turkey
- Full name: Diyarbakır Stadyumu
- Location: Diyarbakır, Turkey
- Owner: Ministry of Youth and Sports (Turkey)
- Capacity: 33,000
- Executive suites: 17
- Surface: Grass
- Record attendance: 33,000 (Diyarbekirspor vs. Tire 1922 SK, 15 May 2018)
- Field size: 105 m x 68 m (344 ft x 223 ft)

Construction
- Groundbreaking: 25 April 2014
- Built: 2014–2018
- Opened: 9 May 2018
- Cost: ₺160 million (2018) €32 million (2018)

Tenants
- Amed SFK; Diyarbakırspor (sometimes)

The Diyarbakır Stadium (Turkish: Diyarbakır Stadyumu) is a football stadium in Diyarbakır, Turkey. It was opened in 2018 and has a capacity of 33,000 spectators. It is the primary home stadium of Amed SFK.
