= Amar Gërxhaliu =

Kosovan footballer (born 2002)

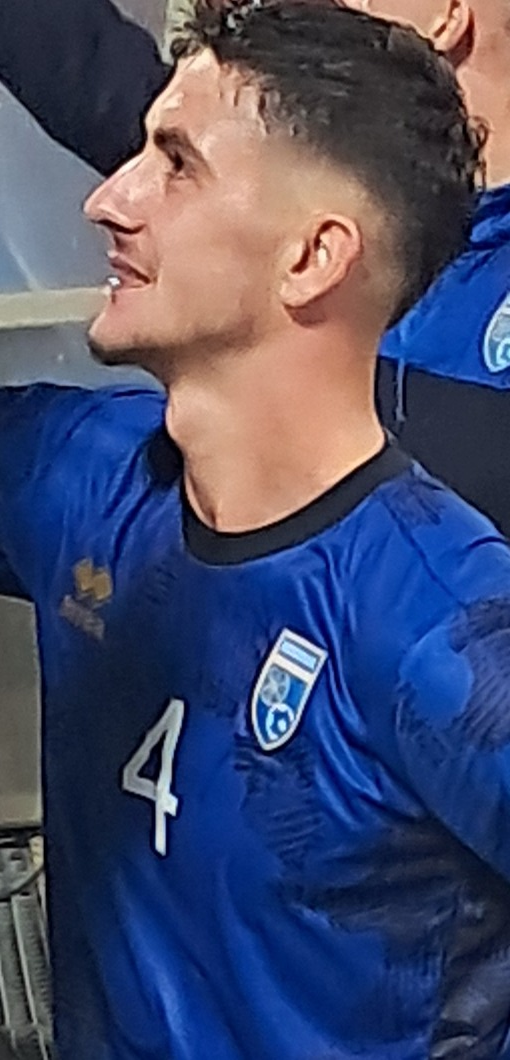
- Gërxhaliu with Kosovo U21 in 2024

Personal information
- Date of birth: 26 April 2002 (age 24)
- Place of birth: Vushtrri, Kosovo under UN administration
- Height: 1.93 m (6 ft 4 in)
- Position: Centre-back

Team information
- Current team: Erzurumspor
- Number: 4

Youth career
- –2017: Vushtrria
- 2017–2020: İstanbul Başakşehir
- 2020–2022: Vushtrria
- 2022–2023: Antalyaspor

Senior career*
Years	Team	Apps	(Gls)
2022–2025	Antalyaspor	23	(1)
2025–	Erzurumspor	30	(1)

International career^{‡}
2019	Albania U18	1	(0)
2020	Kosovo U19	2	(0)
2023–2024	Kosovo U21	4	(0)
- * Club domestic league appearances and goals as of 5 May 2026 ‡ National team caps and goals as of 11 October 2024

Amar Gërxhaliu (born 26 April 2002) is a Kosovar professional footballer who plays as a centre-back for Turkish Süper Lig club Erzurumspor.

== Club career ==
His debut with Antalyaspor came on 9 November 2022 in the 2022–23 Turkish Cup fourth round against Pendikspor after being named in the starting line-up. On 28 January 2023, Gërxhaliu made his league debut in a 3–2 home win against Ümraniyespor after coming on as a substitute at the 72nd minute in place of Ömer Toprak.

== International career ==
=== Youth ===
On 1 August 2019, Gërxhaliu received a call-up from Kosovo U19 for a three-day training camp in Pristina that was being held as part of preparations for the UEFA Euro 2020 qualifications. Seven days later, he switched national team and accepted a call-up from Albania U18 for the friendly match against Romania U18. His debut with Albania U18 came seven days later in a friendly match against Romania U18 after being named in the starting line-up.

On 16 February 2020, Gërxhaliu returned to Kosovo and was named in the under-19 squad for the 2020 Roma Caput Mundi. His debut with Kosovo U19 came two days later in the 2020 Roma Caput Mundi match against Greece U19 after coming on as a substitute.

On 15 September 2022, Gërxhaliu received a call-up from Kosovo U21 for a training camp held in Antalya, Turkey and for the hybrid friendly match against Greenland.

=== Senior ===
On 17 March 2023, Gërxhaliu was included in Kosovo's extended squad for the UEFA Euro 2024 qualifying matches against Israel and Andorra, but did not become part of the final team.

In October 2026, after an absence of approximately three years from international football, Gërxhaliu received the Albanian passport and this paved the way for him to re-represent Albania national team.

== Honours ==
Kosovo U19

- Roma Caput Mundi: 2020
