= Kazım Karabekir Stadium =

Multi-purpose stadium in Erzurum, Turkey

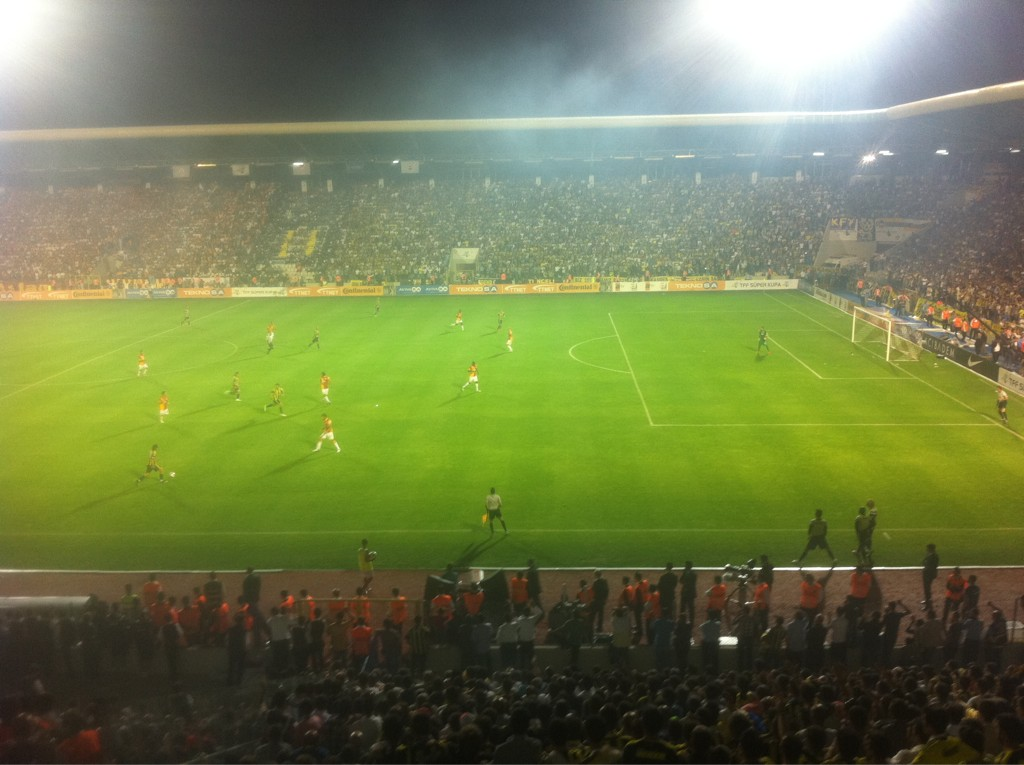

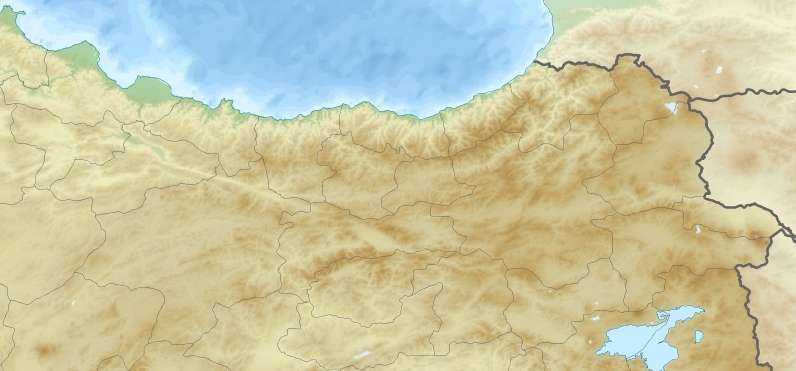
- Location in Northeastern Turkey Location in Turkey
- Former names: Cemal Gürsel Stadium
- Location: Erzurum, Turkey
- Coordinates: 39°54′40″N 41°14′17″E
- Owner: Erzurumspor F.K.
- Capacity: 21,374
- Surface: Grass
- Record attendance: 20,347 (Erzurumspor F.K.–Galatasaray, 14 August 2026)

Construction
- Opened: 1968

Tenant
- Erzurumspor F.K. (2005–present)

Kazım Karabekir Stadium (Turkish: Kazım Karabekir Stadyumu) is a multi-purpose stadium in Erzurum, Turkey. It is currently used mostly for football matches and is the home ground of Erzurumspor F.K. The stadium has a capacity of 21,374 spectators.

The name of the stadium was changed to Kazim Karabekir Stadium on August 10, 2012.
