= Brandon Baiye =

Belgian footballer (born 2000)

Personal information
- Date of birth: 27 December 2000 (age 25)
- Place of birth: Liège, Belgium
- Height: 1.77 m (5 ft 10 in)
- Position: Midfielder

Team information
- Current team: Erzurumspor
- Number: 6

Youth career
- 2011–2018: Brugge

Senior career*
Years	Team	Apps	(Gls)
2018–2019	Club Brugge	1	(0)
2019–2023	Clermont B	14	(0)
2020–2023	Clermont	7	(0)
2020–2022	→ Austria Lustenau (loan)	52	(6)
2023–2025	Eupen	64	(2)
2025–	Erzurumspor	36	(4)

International career^{‡}
2014–2014	Belgium U15	8	(0)
2015–2016	Belgium U16	7	(0)
2016	Belgium U17	2	(1)
2017–2018	Belgium U18	8	(0)
2018–2019	Belgium U19	7	(0)
- * Club domestic league appearances and goals as of 5 May 2026 ‡ National team caps and goals as of 26 March 2019

Brandon Baiye (born 27 December 2000) is a Belgian professional footballer who plays as a midfielder for Turkish TFF 1. Lig club Erzurumspor.

== Club career ==
A member of the Club Brugge KV youth academy since 2011, Baiye made his professional debut with Brugge in a 5–2 Belgian First Division A win over Eupen on 29 July 2018.

On 2 September 2019, he joined French club Clermont Foot on a three-year contract and was initially assigned to their B team.

In January 2023, Baiye returned to Belgium to join Eupen on a two-and-a-half-year deal.

== International career ==
Born in Belgium, Baiye is of Cameroonian descent. Baiye is a youth international for Belgium.

== Honours ==
Club Brugge

- Belgian Super Cup: 2018

Austria Lustenau

- Austrian Football Second League: 2021–22
