= Eren Tozlu =

Turkish footballer (born 1990)

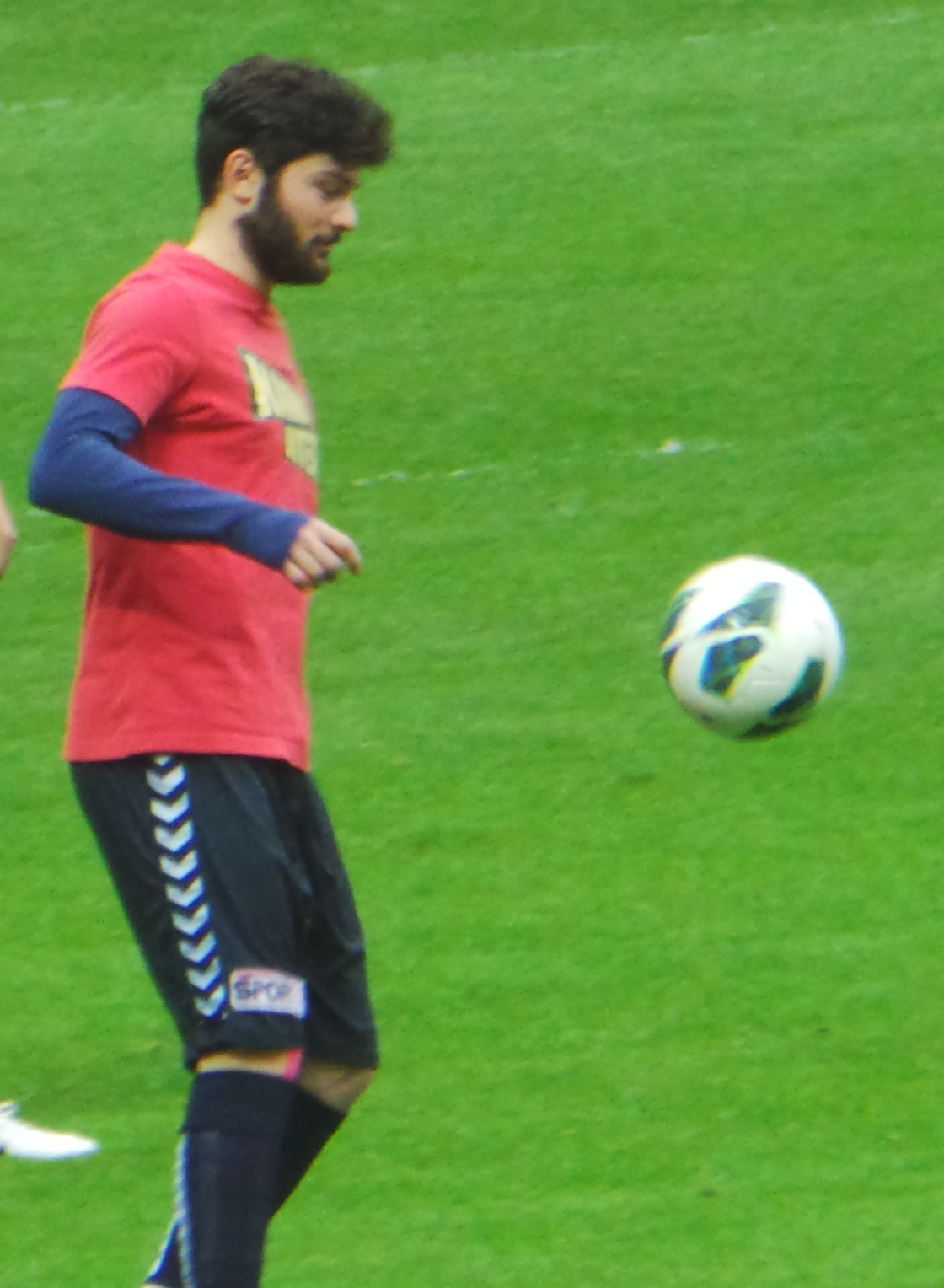

Personal information
- Date of birth: 27 December 1990 (age 35)
- Place of birth: Giresun, Turkey
- Height: 1.75 m (5 ft 9 in)
- Position: Forward

Team information
- Current team: Erzurumspor
- Number: 10

Youth career
- İl Özel İdaresi G&S
- 2006–2009: Giresunspor

Senior career*
Years	Team	Apps	(Gls)
2009–2012	Giresunspor	35	(15)
2010–2011	→ Pazarspor (loan)	31	(5)
2012–2016	Mersin İdman Yurdu	56	(1)
2014–2015	→ Samsunspor (loan)	18	(3)
2016–2020	Yeni Malatyaspor	71	(16)
2020–2021	Giresunspor	30	(9)
2021–	Erzurumspor	166	(70)

International career^{‡}
2012	Turkey A2	3	(1)
- * Club domestic league appearances and goals as of 28 August 2026 ‡ National team caps and goals as of 11 December 2018

Eren Tozlu (born 27 December 1990) is a Turkish footballer who plays as a forward for Erzurumspor.

== Club career ==
He made his Süper Lig debut against İstanbul B.B. on 27 October 2012.
