= Guram Giorbelidze =

Georgian association football player

Personal information
- Date of birth: 25 February 1996 (age 30)
- Place of birth: Bolnisi, Georgia
- Height: 1.75 m (5 ft 9 in)
- Position: Left-back

Team information
- Current team: Erzurumspor
- Number: 15

Youth career
- –2014: Sioni Bolnisi

Senior career*
Years	Team	Apps	(Gls)
2014–2019	Sioni Bolnisi	80	(1)
2019–2020	Dila Gori	36	(0)
2020–2022	Wolfsberger AC	17	(0)
2021–2022	→ Dynamo Dresden (loan)	19	(0)
2022–2023	Zagłębie Lubin	15	(0)
2023	→ Dinamo Batumi (loan)	11	(0)
2023–2024	Vojvodina	14	(0)
2024–	Erzurumspor	66	(2)

International career^{‡}
2017–2018	Georgia U21	6	(0)
2021–	Georgia	12	(0)
- * Club domestic league appearances and goals as of 5 May 2026 ‡ National team caps and goals as of 15 June 2025

Guram Giorbelidze (Georgian: გურამ გიორბელიძე, romanized: guram giorbelidze; born 25 February 1996) is a Georgian professional footballer who plays as a left-back for Erzurumspor.

== Club career ==
After spells at Sioni Bolnisi and Dila Gori in his home country, Giorbelidze joined Austrian Football Bundesliga side Wolfsberger AC in July 2020, signing a two-year contract with an option of an additional year. On 29 November 2020, he made his professional league debut for Wolfsberger AC, as a substitute in a 1–1 draw with Ried.

On 17 July 2022, he joined Polish Ekstraklasa side Zagłębie Lubin on a two-year deal. Giorbelidze quickly earned a spot in the starting line-up and made 15 league appearances for Zagłębie in the first half of the season. Following Piotr Stokowiec's dismissal, Giorbelidze was deemed surplus to requirements by the new manager Waldemar Fornalik. On 22 February 2023, he was sent on loan to Dinamo Batumi until the end of the season.

On 7 August 2023, Giorbelidze signed a two-year deal with Serbian SuperLiga side Vojvodina.

In early September 2024, Giorbelidze joined Turkey's second-division side Erzurumspor on a year-long deal.

== International career ==
After first being called up in October 2017, Giorbelidze made his debut for Georgia U21s in October 2018. He debuted with the Georgia national team in a 1–0 2022 FIFA World Cup qualification loss to Sweden on 25 March 2021.

== Career statistics ==
As of 5 January 2024

Appearances and goals by club, season and competition
Club	Season	League			National cup		Continental		Other		Total	
Club	Season	Division	Apps	Goals	Apps	Goals	Apps	Goals	Apps	Goals	Apps	Goals
Sioni Bolnisi	2013-14	Umaglesi Liga	1	0	–		–		–		1	0
Sioni Bolnisi	2014-15	Umaglesi Liga	2	0	1	0	–		–		3	0
Sioni Bolnisi	2015-16	Umaglesi Liga	9	0	4	0	–		–		13	0
Sioni Bolnisi	2016	Umaglesi Liga	9	0	1	0	–		–		10	0
Sioni Bolnisi	2017	Erovnuli Liga 2	26	1	–		–		2 (Note: Appearances in play-offs)	0	28	1
Sioni Bolnisi	2018	Erovnuli Liga	33	0	1	0	–		2	0	36	0
Sioni Bolnisi	Total		80	1	7	0	0	0	4	0	91	1
Dila Gori	2019	Erovnuli Liga	32	0	1	0	–		–		33	0
Dila Gori	2020	Erovnuli Liga	4	0	–		–		–		4	0
Dila Gori	Total		36	0	1	0	0	0	0	0	37	0
Wolfsberger AC	2020-21	Austrian Bundesliga	17	0	2	0	3 (Note: Appearances in UEFA Europa League)	0	–		22	0
Wolfsberger AC	2021-22	Austrian Bundesliga	0	0	1	0	–		–		1	0
Wolfsberger AC	Total		17	0	3	0	3	0	0	0	23	0
Dynamo Dresden (loan)	2021-22	2. Bundesliga	18	0	–		–		1	0	19	0
Zagłębie Lubin	2022-23	Ekstraklasa	15	0	1	0	–		–		16	0
Dinamo Batumi (loan)	2023	Erovnuli Liga	11	0	1	0	2 (Note: Appearances in UEFA Conference League)	0	2 (Note: Appearances in Georgian Super Cup)	0	16	0
Vojvodina	2023-24	Serbian Superliga	14	0	0	0	–		–		14	0
Vojvodina	2024-25	Serbian Superliga	0	0	0	0	0	0	–		0	0
Vojvodina	Total		14	0	0	0	0	0	–		14	0
Erzurumspor	2024-25	TFF First League	13	1	0	0	–		–		13	1
Career total			204	2	13	0	5	0	7	0	229	2

=== International ===
As of 8 August 2023

Appearances and goals by national team and year
National team	Year	Apps	Goals
Georgia	2021	9	0
Georgia	2022	2	0
Total		11	0
