= Fredy (footballer, born 1990) =

Angolan footballer

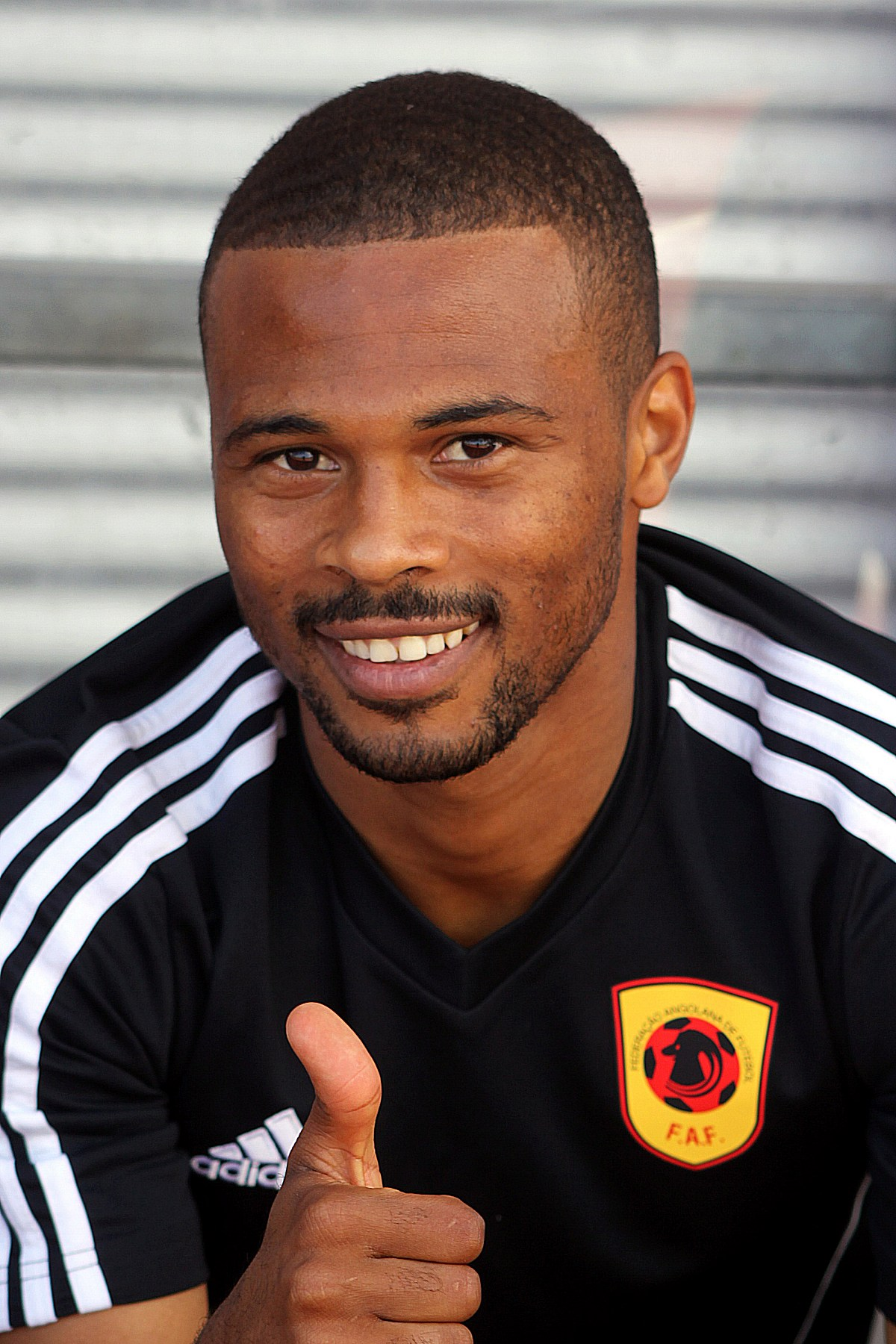
- Fredy with Angola in 2014

Personal information
- Full name: Alfredo Kulembe Ribeiro
- Date of birth: 27 March 1990 (age 36)
- Place of birth: Luanda, Angola
- Height: 1.70 m (5 ft 7 in)
- Position: Winger

Team information
- Current team: Çorum
- Number: 16

Youth career
- 1999–2001: Pescadores
- 2001–2009: Belenenses

Senior career*
Years	Team	Apps	(Gls)
2009–2014	Belenenses	131	(15)
2012	→ Libolo (loan)	10	(1)
2015–2016	Libolo	25	(10)
2016–2017	Excelsior	32	(2)
2017–2018	Belenenses	20	(2)
2018–2019	B-SAD	18	(6)
2019–2023	Antalyaspor	135	(20)
2023–2024	Eyüpspor	24	(2)
2024–2026	Bodrum	52	(13)
2026–	Çorum	20	(5)

International career^{‡}
2006	Portugal U16	9	(1)
2006–2007	Portugal U17	8	(0)
2008	Portugal U18	2	(0)
2008	Portugal U19	1	(0)
2010	Portugal U20	4	(0)
2009–2012	Portugal U21	10	(2)
2014–	Angola	69	(4)
- * Club domestic league appearances and goals as of 00:06, 1 June 2026 (UTC) ‡ National team caps and goals as of 18:11, 29 December 2025 (UTC)

Alfredo Kulembe Ribeiro (born 27 March 1990), known as Fredy, is an Angolan professional footballer who plays as a winger for TFF 1. Lig club Çorum and the Angola national team.

He achieved totals of 108 games and 11 goals in Portugal's Primeira Liga with Belenenses and B-SAD, while winning the Segunda Liga with the former in 2013. He also played one season in the Dutch Eredivisie with Excelsior and for several years at Antalyaspor in Turkey.

Fredy, who also held Portuguese citizenship and represented the country at youth level, made his senior debut for Angola in 2014. He was part of their squads at the 2019, 2023 and 2025 Africa Cup of Nations.

== Club career ==
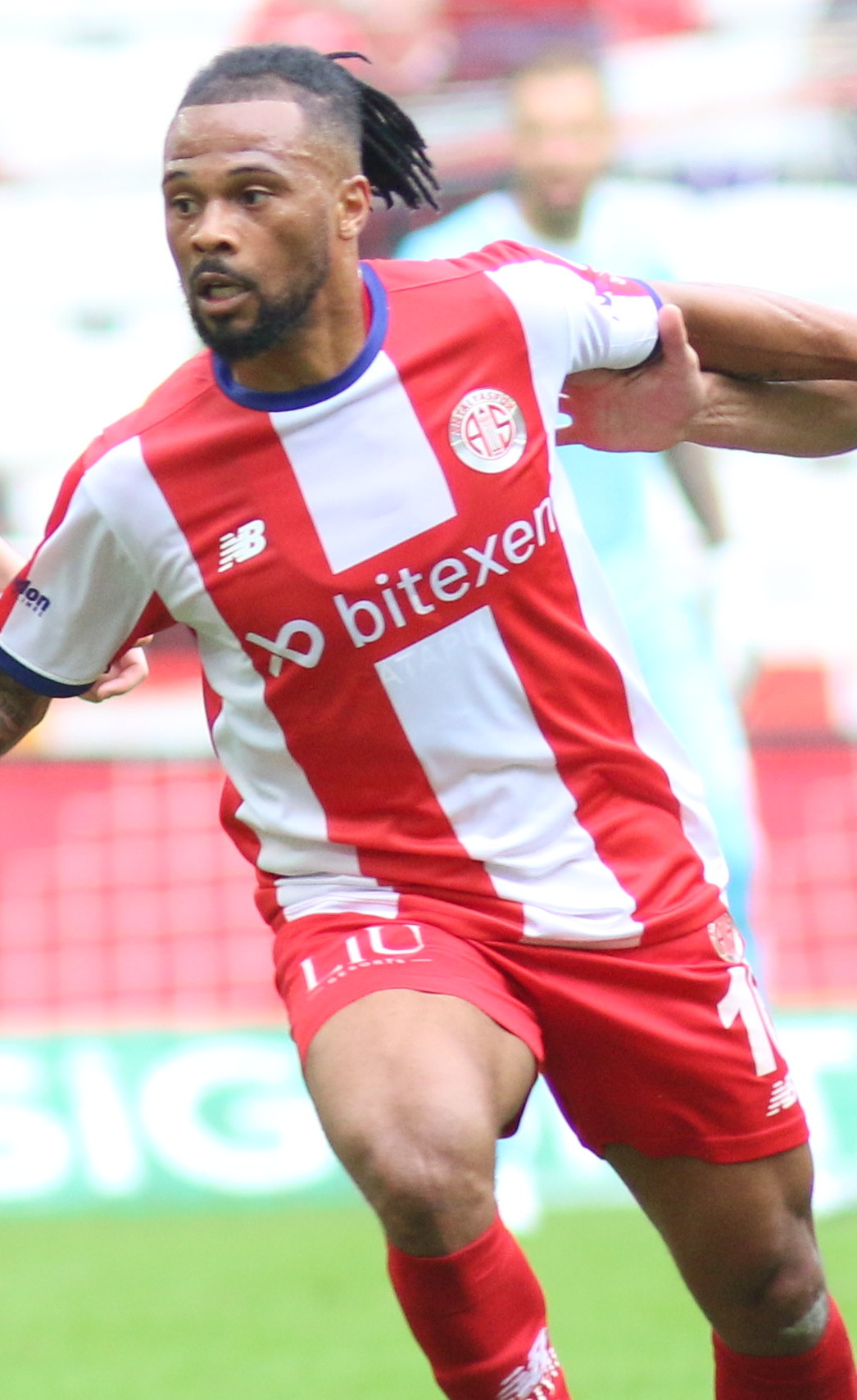
Fredy with Antalyaspor in 2021

Born in Luanda, Fredy joined C.F. Os Belenenses' youth system at the age of 11, signing from neighbouring G.D.P. Costa de Caparica. He made his Primeira Liga debut on 3 April 2009, coming on as a 60th-minute substitute in a 1–0 away loss to Académica de Coimbra. He finished his first full season with 24 scoreless appearances, as the Lisbon team was relegated.

Fredy scored eight goals in 38 games in the 2012–13 campaign, helping the club to return to the top tier as champions after three years. He scored for the first time in the competition on 12 April 2014, his brace helping the team to come from behind to win 3–1 at home against Vitória de Guimarães.

In January 2015, Fredy returned to Angola and signed with C.R.D. Libolo, initially on loan. On 20 July 2016 he agreed to a one-year contract at Excelsior Rotterdam in the Dutch Eredivisie, rejoining his former Belenenses manager Mitchell van der Gaag. He missed just two games in his only season and scored twice in a 12th-place finish, including in a 3–2 home victory over rivals Sparta Rotterdam on 19 November.

Fredy returned to Belenenses in June 2017, signing a two-year deal. He scored six league goals and provided six assists in the first part of 2018–19 for the newly organised B-SAD, including two goals in the 3–2 defeat of C.D. Santa Clara on 30 November.

On 31 January 2019, Fredy moved to Turkish club Antalyaspor. He was a national cup runner-up in 2020–21, scoring in a 2–0 home win over Pendikspor in the fourth round, and a penalty for the only goal in the quarter-final at Sivasspor on 11 February.

== International career ==
Fredy won 34 caps for Portugal at youth level, including ten for the under-21 side. He scored twice for them, in friendlies against Denmark (1–1) and Macedonia (a 2–1 win).

Fredy received his first call-up to the Angola national team in February 2014. He made his debut on 5 March, in a friendly 1–1 draw away to Mozambique; his first goal was on 3 August and was the sole strike of a home victory against Ethiopia in another exhibition.

On 26 March 2016, Fredy scored his first competitive goal for the Palancas Negras from the penalty spot at the end of a 2–1 loss away to the DR Congo, who eventually qualified for the following year's Africa Cup of Nations. He was selected for the 2019 edition in Egypt, starting all three games in a group stage exit.

Fredy also made the squads for the 2023 and the 2025 Africa Cup of Nations.

== Career statistics ==
=== International ===
As of match played 29 December 2025

Appearances and goals by national team and year
National team	Year	Apps	Goals
Angola	2014	8	1
Angola	2015	5	0
Angola	2016	2	1
Angola	2017	1	0
Angola	2018	4	0
Angola	2019	8	0
Angola	2020	0	0
Angola	2021	5	0
Angola	2022	4	0
Angola	2023	9	0
Angola	2024	13	0
Angola	2025	10	2
Total		69	4

As of match played 9 September 2025. Angola score listed first, score column indicates score after each Fredy goal.

Goal	Date	Venue	Opponent	Score	Result	Competition
1.	3 August 2014	Estádio 11 de Novembro, Luanda, Angola	Ethiopia	1–0	1–0	Friendly
2.	26 March 2016	Stade des Martyrs, Kinshasa, Democratic Republic of the Congo	DR Congo	1–2	1–2	2017 Africa Cup of Nations qualification
3.	20 March 2025	Benina Martyrs Stadium, Benghazi, Libya	Libya	1–1	1–1	2026 FIFA World Cup qualification
4.	9 September 2025	Estádio 11 de Novembro, Luanda, Angola	Mauritius	2–1	3–1	2026 FIFA World Cup qualification
