= Erzurumspor F.K. =

Turkish football club

Erzurumspor
- Full name: Erzurumspor Futbol Kulübü
- Nicknames: Dadaşlar, Palandöken Kartalları
- Founded: 1972; 54 years ago as reorganization under the name Erzurum Büyükşehir Belediyespor; 2014; 12 years ago Büyükşehir Belediye Erzurumspor; 2022; 4 years ago Erzurumspor Futbol Kulübü
- Ground: Kazım Karabekir Stadium, Erzurum
- Capacity: 21,374
- Coordinates: 39°54′40″N 41°14′17″E
- President: Ahmet Dal
- Head coach: Serkan Özbalta
- League: Süper Lig
- 2025–26: TFF 1. Lig, 1st of 20 (promoted)
- Website: erzurumsporfk.org
Home colours	Away colours	Third colours

Erzurumspor Futbol Kulübü, is a Turkish professional football club located in Erzurum. The club currently plays in the Süper Lig, the first tier of Turkish football.

Founded in 1972, the colours of club are blue and white. The club started to play football competitions in 2010 at amateur level. Achieving consecutive promotions between 2016 and 2018, the club earned to compete at Süper Lig at 2018–19 season.

== History ==
Former logo

The club has been founded as Erzurum Büyüşehir Belediyespor in 2005. In their inaugural season, club competed at Regional Amateur League and won Group 1 of 2010–11 Turkish Regional Amateur League with 49 points.

Between 2011 and 2016, they played at TFF Third League for 5 consecutive seasons. The club was renamed as Büyükşehir Belediye Erzurumspor in 2014. Club won 2015–16 TFF Third League, collecting 74 points in 36 games, 6 points adrift above Kızılcabölükspor. Promoted to TFF Second League, they competed Group White of 2016–17 season and finished regular season on 3rd spot with 61 points. Eliminating Kocaeli Birlikspor, Amed S.K. and Gümüşhanespor respectively at play-offs, they promoted to TFF First League for 2017–18 season.

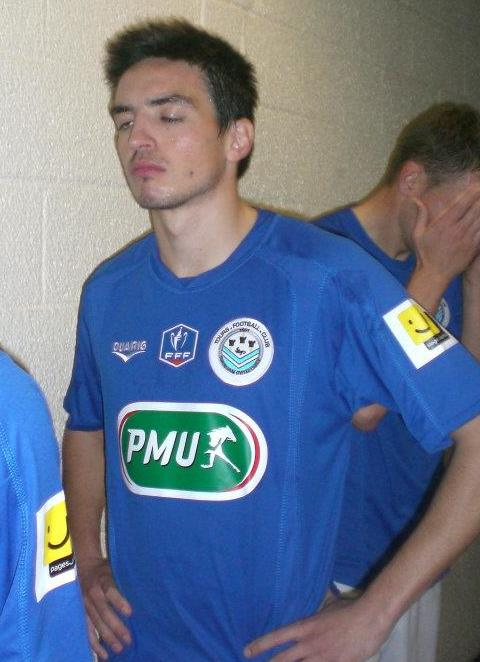
Léo Schwechlen (pictured in 2011) scored the first ever goal of BB Erzurumspor at Süper Lig competitions on 12 August 2018

In 2017–18 season, club eliminated Gazişehir Gaziantep F.K. after the 5–4 final score in play-off final after penalty shoot-outs and promoted to Süper Lig for the first time. They played their first Süper Lig game against Konyaspor on 12 August 2018 at Konya Büyükşehir Stadium where they lost 2–3. Their first goal at Süper Lig level was scored by French defender Leo Schwechlen against Konyaspor. The club could not avoid relegation in their first season at Süper Lig and relegated after sitting at 17th position after 34 weeks, collecting 35 points.

Following season, collected 62 points and achieved the second spot at TFF First League and the club promoted directly Süper Lig together with champion Hatayspor. The club has established their football academy in August 2020.

The club sacked coach Mesut Bakkal after the 1–3 loss against Antalyaspor at week 31 encounter of 2020–21 season, on 21 March 2021. Although the club announced their agreement with İsmail Kartal on 23 March 2021, Kartal resigned his job just 5 days after the employment, during the midseason training camp in Antalya, grounding his reason as "having neither energy, nor motivation", on March 28. The club announced their agreement with Yılmaz Vural, on 29 March 2021.

== Stadium ==
Erzurumspor FK stadium history
#	Stadium	Capacity	Years
1	Kazım Karabekir Stadium	21,374	2010–

Since its foundation, Erzurumspor FK plays their home games at Kazım Karabekir Stadium. Opened in 1968, the stadium was known respectively as Cemal Gürsel Stadium, commemorating after Cemal Gürsel, 4th president of Turkey until 2011, then Yeni Erzurum Stadium until 2012 and Kazim Karabekir Stadium since 2012.

== Honours ==
- TFF First League
  - Winner: 2025–26
  - Play-off Winner: 2017–18
- TFF Second League
  - Play-off Winner: 2016–17
- TFF Third League
  - Winner: 2015–16
- Turkish Regional Amateur League
  - Winner: 2010–11

== League affiliations ==
- Süper Lig: 2018–19, 2020–21, 2026-
- TFF First League: 2017–18, 2019–20, 2021–
- TFF Second League: 2016–17
- TFF Third League: 2011–16
- Turkish Regional Amateur League: 2010–11
- Amateur Leagues: 1972–2010

== Team statistics ==
=== Recent seasons ===
Results of league and cup competitions by season
Season	League									Domestic Cup		Europe		Other		Top goalscorer(s)	Ref
Division	Pos	Pld	W	D	L	GS	GA	Pts	Competition	Result	Competition	Result	Competition	Result	Name(s)	Goals	Ref
2010–11	Regional Amateur League - Group 1	1st	18	16	1	1	61	11	49	Turkish Cup	—	—		—		Abdullah Koparan	
2011–12	TFF Third League - Group 3	6th	36	15	8	13	46	42	53	Turkish Cup	—	—		—		Ersin Şen	
2012–13	TFF Third League - Group 3	6th	34	18	10	6	53	25	64	Turkish Cup	Round 2	—		—		Fatih Gültekin	
2013–14	TFF Third League - Group 2	5th	34	15	11	8	45	31	56	Turkish Cup	Round 2	—		—		Sefer Sever	
2014–15	TFF Third League - Group 3	4th	34	14	12	8	42	34	54	Turkish Cup	Round 3	—		—		Mehmet Albayrak	
2015–16	TFF Third League - Group 1	1st	36	22	8	6	67	32	74	Turkish Cup	Round 2	—		—		Mehmet Albayrak	
2016–17	TFF Second League - White Group	3rd	34	17	10	7	56	33	61	Turkish Cup	Round 3	—		Promotion play-offs	Winner	Mert Nobre	
2017–18	TFF First League	5th	34	14	11	9	56	44	53	Turkish Cup	Round 5	—		Promotion play-offs	Winner	Erhan Çelenk	
2018–19	Süper Lig	17th	34	8	11	15	36	43	35	Turkish Cup	Round 4	—		—		Taylan Antalyalı	
2019–20	TFF First League	2nd	34	18	8	8	42	26	62	Turkish Cup	Quarter-final	—		—		Mickaël Poté	

== Players ==
=== Current squad ===
As of 4 September 2026

Note: Flags indicate national team as defined under FIFA eligibility rules; some limited exceptions apply. Players may hold more than one non-FIFA nationality.

No.	Pos.	Nation	Player
1	GK	TUR	Ertuğrul Taşkıran
2	DF	IRL	Festy Ebosele (on loan from İstanbul Başakşehir)
3	DF	TUR	Yakup Kırtay
4	DF	KOS	Amar Gërxhaliu
6	MF	BEL	Brandon Baiye
8	MF	TUR	Sefa Akgün
9	FW	SUR	Gyrano Kerk
10	FW	TUR	Eren Tozlu
15	DF	GEO	Guram Giorbelidze
17	GK	TUR	Erkan Anapa
18	DF	BIH	Nihad Mujakić
19	FW	CIV	Ibrahim Diabate (on loan from GAIS)
20	FW	POR	Miguel Cardoso
21	MF	TUR	Emirhan Acar

No.	Pos.	Nation	Player
22	DF	TUR	Mustafa Yumlu (captain)
23	DF	TUR	Cengizhan Bayrak
25	DF	TUR	Ömer Arda Kara
31	GK	CRO	Matija Orbanić
42	MF	GHA	Elisha Owusu
53	DF	TUR	Orhan Ovacıklı
65	FW	CHI	Martín Rodríguez
77	MF	GHA	Lawrence Agyekum (on loan from Cercle Brugge)
90	FW	AZE	Nariman Akhundzade (on loan from Columbus Crew)
99	FW	TUR	Mustafa Fettahoğlu
—	GK	TUR	Şerefhan Sağlık
—	DF	TUR	Emre Erdem
—	DF	TUR	Taha Rençber

=== Out on loan ===
Note: Flags indicate national team as defined under FIFA eligibility rules; some limited exceptions apply. Players may hold more than one non-FIFA nationality.

No.	Pos.	Nation	Player
—	DF	TUR	Ali Ülgen (at Bandırmaspor until 30 June 2027)
—	DF	TUR	Furkan Özhan (at Vanspor until 30 June 2027)

No.	Pos.	Nation	Player
—	MF	TUR	Mert Önal (at Sebat FK until 30 June 2027)
—	MF	TUR	İlkan Sever (at Vanspor until 30 June 2027)

== Coaching staff ==
As of 9 April 2021

Position	Staff
Head coach	(Turkey) Serkan Özbalta
Assistant coach	(Turkey) Orkun Yıldırım
Assistant coach	(Turkey) Turgay Demir
Assistant coach	(Turkey) Faruk Öztürk
Assistant coach	(Turkey) Ersun Can
Goalkeeping coach	(Turkey) Mustafa Güneş
Performance and Athletics Coach	(Turkey) Uğur Kılıç
Scout	(Turkey) Fatih Mesut Yılmaz
Scout	(Turkey) Eyüp Hakanoğlu

== Coaching history ==
Nationality	Name	Years
(Turkey)	Hasan Çelik	2010–2011
(Turkey)	Faik Demir	2011–2012
(Turkey)	Taşkın Güngör	2012–2013
(Turkey)	Yavuz İncedal	2013–2014
(Turkey)	Taşkın Güngör	2014–2015
(Turkey)	Turhan Özyazanlar	2015
(Turkey)	Besim Durmuş	2015–2016
(Turkey)	Ahmet Yıldırım	2016–2017
(Turkey)	Osman Özköylü	2017–2018
(Turkey)	Mehmet Altıparmak	2018

Nationality	Name	Years
(Turkey)	Mehmet Özdilek	2018–2019
(Turkey)	Hamza Hamzaoğlu	2019
(Turkey)	Muzaffer Bilazer	2019
(Turkey)	Erkan Sözeri	2019–2020
(Turkey)	Mehmet Özdilek	2020
(Turkey)	Hüseyin Çimşir	2020
(Turkey)	Mesut Bakkal	2020–2021
(Turkey)	İsmail Kartal	2021
(Turkey)	Yılmaz Vural	2021
(Turkey)	Erkan Sözeri	2021–2022

Nationality	Name	Years
(Turkey)	Yücel İldiz	2022
(Turkey)	Muzaffer Bilazer	2022–2023
(Turkey)	Hakan Kutlu	2023–2025
(Turkey)	Serkan Özbalta	2025–

== Presidential history ==
As of 27 December 2020

Years	Nationality	Name
2011	(Turkey)	Ahmet Küçükler
2012	(Turkey)	Mehmet Aydın
2012–2015	(Turkey)	Saim Özakalın
2015	(Turkey)	Ali Demirhan
2018–2019	(Turkey)	Mevlüt Doğan
2019–2020	(Turkey)	Hüseyin Üneş
2020–	(Turkey)	Ömer Düzgün
