= 2026–27 Galatasaray S.K. season =

Galatasaray
2026–27 season
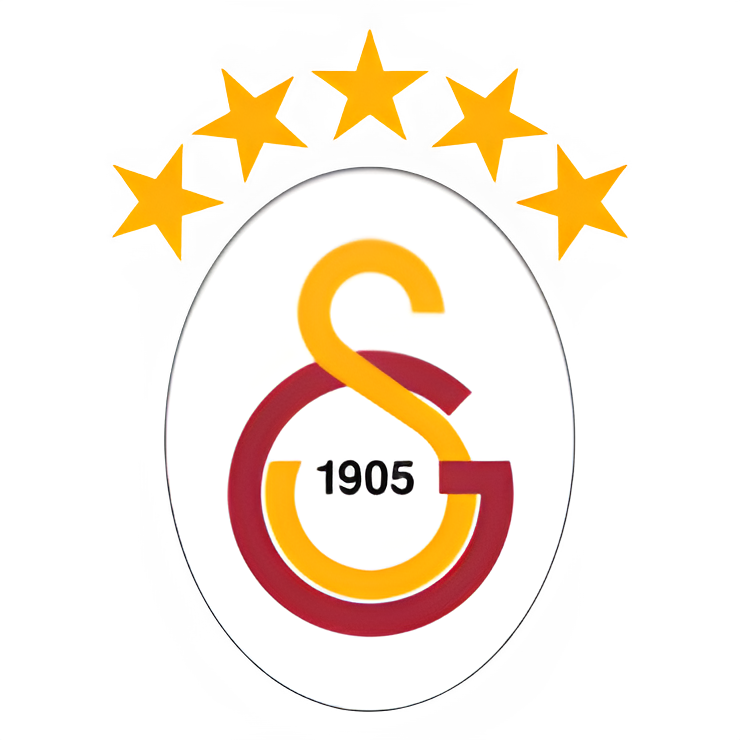
- President: Dursun Özbek
- Head coach: Okan Buruk
- Stadium: Rams Park
- Süper Lig: 1st
- Turkish Cup: Fifth round
- Turkish Super Cup: Semi-final
- UEFA Champions League: League stage
- Top goalscorer: League: Victor Osimhen (9); All: Victor Osimhen (10)
- Highest home attendance: 52,633 vs Fenerbahçe, 26 October 2026, Süper Lig
- Lowest home attendance: 44,286 vs Kasımpaşa 9 October 2026, Süper Lig
- Average home league attendance: 47,742
- Biggest win: 4–0 vs Erzurumspor (A), 21 August 2026, Süper Lig; 4–0 vs Konyaspor (A), 30 October 2026, Süper Lig
- Biggest defeat: 0–4 vs Trabzonspor (A), 19 September 2026, Süper Lig
Home colours	Away colours	Third colours
- All statistics correct as of 9 November 2026.

The 2026–27 season is the 122st season in the existence of Galatasaray S.K., and the club's 69th consecutive season in the top flight of Turkish football. In addition to the domestic league, Galatasaray participated in this season's edition of the Turkish Cup, Turkish Super Cup and UEFA Champions League.

== Kits ==
Galatasaray's 2026–27 kits, manufactured by Puma, were unveiled on 4 July 2026 and went on sale on the same day.

=== Sponsor ===
- Supplier: Puma
- Main sponsor: Pasifik Holding
- Main sponsor (Europe): Pasifik Holding
- Side sponsor: –
- Back sponsor: –
- Sleeve sponsor: Misli, Sürat Kargo
- Sleeve sponsor (Europe): Turkish Airlines
- Shorts sponsor: Reges Elektrik
- Socks sponsor: Port Filo

=== Match ===
Home
Home alt.
Home alt.
Away
Third
Fourth
Goalkeeper 1
Goalkeeper 2
Goalkeeper 3

== Season overview ==
=== Pre-season ===
On 7 July, Galatasaray started their preparations for the new season with a training session at the Kemerburgaz Metin Oktay Facilities.

On 9 July, the 2026–27 Süper Lig fixtures were announced.

On 3 September, Galatasaray representing Turkey in the league phase of the 2026–27 UEFA Champions League season, has submitted its squad list to UEFA.

=== October ===
On 17 October, In the 8th week of the Süper Lig, Galatasaray defeated Gençlerbirliği 1-0 away from home.

On 21 October, Galatasaray earned their first points in the UEFA Champions League by defeating French side Lille 4-2 in the third week of the competition.

On 26 October, In the derby match of the 9th week of the Süper Lig, Galatasaray defeated Fenerbahçe 2-1 at home.

On 30 October, Galatasaray maintained their lead in the Süper Lig by defeating Konyaspor 4-0 away in the opening match of the 10th week.

=== November ===
On 3 November, In their UEFA Champions League group stage match on week 4, Galatasaray defeated German side VfB Stuttgart 2–0 at home, increasing their points total to 6.

On 7 November, In the 11th week of the Süper Lig, Galatasaray faced Amedspor on their home turf. The "Yellow-Reds" finished the first half with a 2–0 lead and ultimately secured a 4–3 victory. With this result, the "Lions" brought their point total to 28 and maintained their position at the top of the table.

On 21 November, In the 12th week of the Süper Lig, Galatasaray faced Samsunspor at the Başakşehir Fatih Terim Stadium. The Yellow-Reds, who led 1–0 at halftime, emerged victorious with a 2–1 scoreline. With this result, Galatasaray increased their points to 31 and maintained their lead in the league.

== Management team ==
Position	Staff
Head Coach	(Turkey) Okan Buruk
Assistant Coach	(Turkey) İrfan Saraloğlu
Assistant Coach	(Spain) Ismael García Gómez
Assistant Coach	(Turkey) Can Mutlu
Assistant Coach	(Turkey) Orhan Atik
Goalkeeping Coach	(Turkey) Fadıl Koşutan
Goalkeeping Coach	(Turkey) Can Okuyucu
Goalkeeping Coach	(Turkey) Eray İşcan
Athletic Performance Coach	(Turkey) Kaan Arısoy
Athletic Performance Coach	(Turkey) Yusuf Köklü
Athletic Performance Coach	(Turkey) Gürkan Fuat Demir
Athletic Performance Coach	(Turkey) Vural Durmuş
Match and Performance Analyst	(Turkey) Yılmaz Yüksel
Match and Performance Analyst	(Turkey) Serhat Doğan
Match and Performance Analyst	(Turkey) Ali Yavuz
Match and Performance Analyst	(Turkey) Furkan Uçar
Administrative Manager	(Turkey) Uğur Yıldız
Scouting and Performance Analysis Manager	(Turkey) Emre Utkucan
Doctor	(Turkey) Yener İnce
Doctor	(Turkey) Hakan Çelebi
Media and Communications Manager	(Turkey) Coşkun Gülbahar
Media Officer	(Turkey) Egehan Şengül
Interpreter	(Turkey) Ersan Zeren
Interpreter	(Turkey) Utku Yurtbil
Nutritionist	(Turkey) Mestan Hüseyin Çilekçi
Physiotherapist	(Turkey) Mustafa Korkmaz
Physiotherapist	(Turkey) Burak Koca
Physiotherapist	(Turkey) Samet Polat
Physiotherapist	(Turkey) Erkan Özyılmaz
Masseur	(Turkey) Sedat Peker
Masseur	(Turkey) Batuhan Erkan
Masseur	(Turkey) Ozan Abaylı
Masseur	(Turkey) Serdal Yılmaz
Material Manager	(Turkey) Hasan Çelik
Material Manager	(Turkey) Veli Muğlı
Material Manager	(Turkey) İlyas Gökçe
Material Manager	(Turkey) Harun Karakaş

Last updated: 29 August 2026.
Source: Galatasaray.org

== Players ==
=== First team ===
Notes:

- Players and squad numbers last updated on 4 September 2026. Age as of 30 June 2027.
- Flags indicate national team as defined under FIFA eligibility rules. Players may hold more than one non-FIFA nationality.

No.	Player	Nat.	Position(s)	Date of birth (Age)	Signed in	Contract ends	Transfer fee	Ref.
Goalkeepers
1	Uğurcan Çakır	(Turkey)	GK	5 April 1996 (aged 31)	2025	2030	€27,500,000	
19	Günay Güvenç	(Turkey) (Germany)	GK	25 June 1991 (aged 36)	2023	2028	€250,000	
24	Jankat Yılmaz	(Turkey)	GK	16 August 2004 (aged 22)	2018	2027	Youth system	
70	Enes Emre Büyük	(Turkey)	GK	8 May 2006 (aged 21)	2025	2027	Youth system	
Defenders
3	El Chadaille Bitshiabu	(France) (Democratic Republic of the Congo)	CB	16 May 2005 (aged 22)	2026	2027	Loan	
4	Ismail Jakobs	(Senegal) (Germany)	LB	17 August 1999 (aged 27)	2024	2029	€8,000,000	
6	Davinson Sánchez	(Colombia)	CB	12 June 1996 (aged 31)	2023	2029	€9,500,000	
17	Eren Elmalı	(Turkey)	LB	7 July 2000 (aged 26)	2025	2028	€3,500,000	
23	Kaan Ayhan (3rd captain)	(Turkey) (Germany)	CB	10 November 1994 (aged 32)	2023	2028	€2,800,000	
42	Abdülkerim Bardakcı (captain)	(Turkey)	CB	7 September 1994 (aged 32)	2022	2027	€2,800,000	
88	Kazımcan Karataş	(Turkey)	LB	16 January 2003 (aged 24)	2022	2027	€1,150,000	
90	Wilfried Singo	(Ivory Coast)	RB	25 December 2000 (aged 26)	2025	2030	€30,800,000	
91	Arda Ünyay	(Turkey)	CB	18 January 2007 (aged 20)	2025	2028	€500,000	
Midfielders
5	Eyüp Aydın	(Germany) (Turkey)	DM	2 August 2004 (aged 22)	2023	2027	€250,000	
7	Roland Sallai	(Hungary)	RW	22 May 1997 (aged 30)	2024	2028	€6,000,000	
8	Gabriel Sara	(Brazil)	CM	26 June 1999 (aged 28)	2024	2029	€18,000,000	
10	Leroy Sané	(Germany) (France)	RW	11 January 1996 (aged 31)	2025	2028	Free	
11	Yunus Akgün	(Turkey)	RW	7 July 2000 (aged 26)	2011	2029	Youth system	
18	Lesley Ugochukwu	(France) (Nigeria)	DM	26 March 2004 (aged 23)	2026	2027	Loan	
20	İlkay Gündoğan	(Germany)	CM	24 October 1990 (aged 36)	2025	2027	Free	
27	Rafael Leão	(Portugal) (Angola)	LW	10 June 1999 (aged 28)	2026	2030	€38,000,000	
29	Armando Güner	(Argentina) (Germany)	RW	7 January 2008 (aged 19)	2026	2030	€350,000	
34	Lucas Torreira	(Uruguay) (Spain)	DM	11 February 1996 (aged 31)	2022	2028	€6,000,000	
53	Barış Alper Yılmaz	(Turkey)	LW	23 May 2000 (aged 27)	2021	2028	Undisclosed	
74	Renato Nhaga	(Guinea-Bissau) (Portugal)	CM	27 March 2007 (aged 20)	2026	2030	€6,500,000	
76	Berat Luş	(Turkey)	LW	20 April 2007 (aged 20)	2024	2027	Youth system	
83	Aleksey Batrakov	(Russia)	AM	9 June 2005 (aged 22)	2026	2031	€25,000,000	
99	Mario Lemina	(Gabon) (France)	DM	1 September 1993 (aged 32)	2025	2028	€2,500,000	
Forwards
21	Deniz Gül	(Turkey) (Sweden)	CF	2 July 2004 (aged 22)	2026	2031	€10,000,000	
45	Victor Osimhen (vice-captain)	(Nigeria)	CF	29 December 1998 (aged 28)	2024	2029	€75,000,000	
62	Ada Yüzgeç	(Turkey)	CF	3 April 2009 (aged 18)	2019	2029	Youth system	
Player(s) on loan during the season
3	Metehan Baltacı	(Turkey)	CB	3 November 2002 (aged 24)	2012	2028	Youth system	
21	Ahmed Kutucu	(Turkey) (Germany)	CF	1 March 2000 (aged 27)	2025	2028	€5,900,000	
24	Elias Jelert	(Denmark)	RB	12 June 2003 (aged 24)	2024	2029	€9,000,000	
26	Carlos Cuesta	(Colombia)	CB	9 March 1999 (aged 28)	2025	2028	€8,000,000	
–	Ali Yeşilyurt	(Turkey)	CB	30 July 2005 (aged 21)	2023	2028	Youth system	
–	Halil Dervişoğlu	(Turkey) (Netherlands)	CF	8 December 1999 (aged 27)	2023	2027	€500,000	

=== Reserve team ===
N	Pos.	Nat.	Name	Age	EU	Since	App	Goals	Ends	Transfer fee	Notes
51	FW	(Turkey)	Arda Tagay	18	Non-EU	2021	–	–	2029	Youth system	
52	GK	(Turkey)	Cem Efe Eroğlu	17	Non-EU	2025	–	–	2027	Youth system	
56	DF	(Turkey)	Yusuf Sivaslıoğlu	16	Non-EU	2025	–	–	2029	Youth system	
57	MF	(Turkey)	Necati Oğulcan Yançel	17	Non-EU	2018	–	–	2028	Youth system	
60	GK	(Turkey)	Arda Yılmaz	18	Non-EU	2025	–	–	2028	Youth system	
62	FW	(Turkey)	Ada Yüzgeç	17	Non-EU	2024	–	–	2029	Youth system	
64	DF	(Turkey)	Yusuf Dağhan Kahraman	18	Non-EU	2018	–	–	2028	Youth system	
67	MF	(Turkey)	Eyüp Can Karasu	19	Non-EU	2017	–	–	2029	Youth system	
68	MF	(Turkey)	Furkan Koçak	18	Non-EU	2018	–	–	2029	Youth system	

- Last updated: 20 October 2026
- Source: Galatasaray.org
- Ordered by squad number.

== Contracts and transfers ==
=== New contracts ===
Date	No.	Pos.	Player	Until	Team	Ref.
21 July 2026	99	MF	(Gabon) (France) Mario Lemina	30 June 2028	First team	

=== Transfers in ===
Date	No.	Pos.	Player	From	Fee	Team	Ref.
20 August 2026	83	MF	(Russia) Aleksey Batrakov	(Russia) Lokomotiv Moscow	€25,000,000 + Add-ons	First team	
29 August 2026	27	MF	(Portugal) (Angola) Rafael Leão	(Italy) AC Milan	€38,000,000 + Add-ons	First team	
1 September 2026	21	FW	(Turkey) (Sweden) Deniz Gül	(Portugal) Porto	€10,000,000 + Add-ons	First team	

=== Loans in ===
Date	No.	Pos.	Player	From	Fee	Option to buy	Team	Ref.
13 July 2026	18	MF	(France) (Nigeria) Lesley Ugochukwu	(England) Burnley	£3,000,000	Yes	First team	
2 September 2026	3	DF	(France) (Democratic Republic of the Congo) El Chadaille Bitshiabu	(Germany) RB Leipzig	€2,000,000	Yes	First team	

=== Loan returns ===
Date	No.	Pos.	Player	Returning from	Fee	Team	Ref.
30 June 2026	—	GK	(Turkey) Jankat Yılmaz	(Turkey) Eyüpspor	Loan return	First team	
30 June 2026	—	DF	(Turkey) Ali Yeşilyurt	(Turkey) Yalova FK	Loan return	First team	
30 June 2026	—	DF	(Turkey) Ali Turap Bülbül	(Turkey) Ümraniyespor	Loan return	First team	
30 June 2026	—	DF	(Denmark) Elias Jelert	(England) Southampton	Loan return	First team	
30 June 2026	—	DF	(Turkey) Kadir Subaşı	(Turkey) Ankara Demirspor	Loan return	First team	
30 June 2026	—	DF	(Turkey) Kazımcan Karataş	(Turkey) İstanbul Başakşehir	Loan return	First team	
30 June 2026	—	DF	(Denmark) Victor Nelsson	(Italy) Hellas Verona	Loan return	First team	
30 June 2026	—	MF	(Turkey) Ali Efe Çördek	(Turkey) Arnavutköy Belediyesi FSK	Loan return	First team	
30 June 2026	—	MF	(Turkey) Berat Luş	(Turkey) Esenler Erokspor	Loan return	First team	
30 June 2026	—	MF	(Germany) (Turkey) Eyüp Aydın	(Turkey) Kasımpaşa	Loan return	First team	
30 June 2026	—	MF	(Turkey) İlhami Siraçhan Nas	(Turkey) Kahramanmaraş İstiklal Spor	Loan return	First team	
30 June 2026	—	MF	(Italy) Nicolò Zaniolo	(Italy) Udinese	Loan return	First team	
30 June 2026	—	FW	(Turkey) (Netherlands) Halil Dervişoğlu	(Turkey) Çaykur Rizespor	Loan return	First team	

=== Released ===
Date	No.	Pos.	Player	Subsequent club	Fee	Team	Ref.
30 June 2026	9	FW	(Argentina) (Italy) Mauro Icardi		End of contract	First team	
30 June 2026	12	GK	(Turkey) Batuhan Şen	(Turkey) Fatih Karagümrük	End of contract	First team	
30 June 2026	14	MF	(Ivory Coast) (England) Wilfried Zaha		End of contract	First team	
30 June 2026	33	MF	(Germany) (Turkey) Gökdeniz Gürpüz	(Germany) Saarbrücken	End of contract	First team	
30 June 2026	99	MF	(Gabon) (France) Mario Lemina		End of contract	First team	

=== Transfers out ===
Date	No.	Pos.	Player	To	Fee	Team	Ref.
15 June 2026	—	MF	(Italy) Nicolò Zaniolo	(Italy) Udinese	€5,000,000	First team	
13 August 2026	—	DF	(Turkey) Umut Erdem	(Turkey) Çaykur Rizespor	Undisclosed	First team	
13 August 2026	—	MF	(Turkey) Ali Efe Çördek	(Turkey) 12 Bingölspor	Undisclosed	First team	
17 August 2026	81	DF	(Turkey) Ali Turap Bülbül	(Turkey) Amedspor	Undisclosed	First team	
2 September 2026	25	DF	(Denmark) Victor Nelsson	(Denmark) Nordsjælland	Contract termination	First team	
4 September 2026	–	MF	(Turkey) İlhami Siraçhan Nas	(Turkey) Adana 01 FK	Contract termination	First team	

=== Loans ended ===
Date	No.	Pos.	Player	Returning to	Fee	Team	Ref.
30 June 2026	22	MF	(Colombia) Yáser Asprilla	(Spain) Girona	Loan return	First team	
30 June 2026	77	MF	(Netherlands) (Suriname) Noa Lang	(Italy) Napoli	Loan return	First team	
30 June 2026	93	DF	(France) Sacha Boey	(Germany) Bayern Munich	Loan return	First team	

=== Loans out ===
Date	No.	Pos.	Player	Loaned to	Fee	On loan until	Team	Ref.
3 August 2025	—	DF	(Poland) Przemysław Frankowski	(France) Stade Rennais	€5,500,000 + Add-ons	30 June 2027	First team	
1 September 2025	—	DF	(Colombia) Carlos Cuesta	(Brazil) Vasco da Gama	€750,000 + Add-ons	31 December 2026	First team	
16 July 2026	—	DF	(Turkey) Ali Yeşilyurt	(Turkey) Elazığspor	Undisclosed	End of season	First team	
19 July 2026	21	FW	(Turkey) (Germany) Ahmed Kutucu	(Turkey) Çaykur Rizespor	Undisclosed	End of season	First team	
3 August 2026	72	MF	(Turkey) Berat Yılmaz	(Turkey) Ümraniyespor	Undisclosed	End of season	First team	
13 August 2026	58	FW	(Turkey) Recep Yalın Dilek	(Turkey) Bandırmaspor	Undisclosed	End of season	First team	
14 August 2026	—	FW	(Turkey) (Netherlands) Halil Dervişoğlu	(Turkey) Gaziantep	Undisclosed	End of season	First team	
21 August 2026	12	DF	(Denmark) Elias Jelert	(France) Le Havre	Undisclosed	End of season	First team	
22 August 2026	3	DF	(Turkey) Metehan Baltacı	(Turkey) Gençlerbirliği	Undisclosed	End of season	First team	

== Friendlies ==
Win Draw Loss Fixtures

=== Pre-season ===
17 July 2026 Friendly	Ümraniyespor (Turkey)	1–5	(Turkey) Galatasaray	Istanbul, Turkey
21:00 TRT (UTC+3)	Eser 13'; Karasu (yellow card) 67'	Report 1 Report 2 Report 3	Yüzgeç 35'; Karataş 42'; Güner 60'; Luş 62'; Tagay 70'	Stadium: Ümraniye Municipality City Stadium; Attendance: 2,000

24 July 2026 Summer Series Upper Austria	Galatasaray (Turkey)	0–2	(Italy) Monza	Linz, Austria
21:00 TRT (UTC+3)		Report 1 Report 2 Report 3	Carboni 23'; Cutrone 49'; Brorsson (yellow card) 69'	Stadium: Raiffeisen Arena; Attendance: 9,000

27 July 2026 Summer Series Upper Austria	Galatasaray (Turkey)	0–3	(Italy) Venezia	Linz, Austria
21:00 TRT (UTC+3)	Yılmaz (yellow card) 80', (penalty missed) 90'	Report 1 Report 2 Report 3	Yeboah 71'; Lauberbach 75' (pen.), 90+2'	Stadium: Donauparkstadion; Attendance: 4,000

2 August 2026 Friendly	Galatasaray (Turkey)	3–3	(France) Rennais	Istanbul, Turkey
21:00 TRT (UTC+3)	Osimhen 18'; Sara 49'; Yılmaz 90+4' (pen.)	Report 1 Report 2 Report 3	Lepaul 27', 58', 61' (pen.); Thomasson (yellow card) 90+2'	Stadium: Rams Park; Attendance: 10,000; Referee: Oğuzhan Çakır

8 August 2026 Friendly	Galatasaray (Turkey)	1–2	(Spain) Villarreal	Istanbul, Turkey
21:00 TRT (UTC+3)	Osimhen 5', (yellow card) 39'; Sallai (yellow card) 68'	Report 1 Report 2 Report 3	Pérez 3' (pen.); Mouriño (yellow card) 39'; Mikautadze 41'	Stadium: Rams Park; Attendance: 16,519

=== Mid-season ===
2 October 2026 Friendly	Pendikspor (Turkey)	3–3	(Turkey) Galatasaray	Pendik, Istanbul, Turkey
17:30 TRT (UTC+3)	İnce 15'; Yeşil 24'; Karadeniz 35'; Özdemir (yellow card) 46'	Report 1 Report 2 Report 3	Ünyay 67'; Tagay 84'; Ayhan 88' (pen.)	Stadium: Pendik Stadium

== Competitions ==
=== Overall record ===
Competition	First match	Last match	Starting round	Record							
Competition	First match	Last match	Starting round	Pld	W	D	L	GF	GA	GD	Win %
Süper Lig	14 August 2026	May 2027	Matchday 1	12	10	1	1	29	16	+13	83.33
Turkish Cup	December 2026		Fifth round	0	0	0	0	0	0	+0	—
Turkish Super Cup	2026	2026	Semi-finals	0	0	0	0	0	0	+0	—
UEFA Champions League	9 September 2026	January 2027	League phase	4	2	0	2	8	9	−1	50.00
Total				16	12	1	3	37	25	+12	75.00

Last updated: 21 November 2026
Source: Soccerway

Current position
Competition won

=== Süper Lig ===
==== League table ====
Pos	Team	Pld	W	D	L	GF	GA	GD	Pts	Qualification or relegation
1	Galatasaray	12	10	1	1	29	16	+13	31	Qualification for the Champions League league phase
2	Trabzonspor	11	8	1	2	26	8	+18	25	Qualification for the Champions League third qualifying round
3	Amedspor	12	7	2	3	28	17	+11	23	Qualification for the Europa League second qualifying round
4	Beşiktaş	11	7	1	3	23	12	+11	22	Qualification for the Conference League second qualifying round
5	Fenerbahçe	12	6	2	4	31	12	+19	20	

Updated to match(es) played on 21 November 2026. Source: Süper Lig
Rules for classification: 1) Points; 2) Head-to-head points; 3) Head-to-head goal difference; 4) Head-to-head goals scored; 5) Goal difference; 6) Goals scored; 7) Play-off.
(Note: Head-to-head record is used only after all the matches between the teams in question have been played)

==== Results summary ====
Overall								Home						Away					
Pld	W	D	L	GF	GA	GD	Pts	W	D	L	GF	GA	GD	W	D	L	GF	GA	GD
12	10	1	1	29	16	+13	31	6	1	0	17	10	+7	4	0	1	12	6	+6

Last updated: 21 November 2026.
Source: TFF.org

Pld = Matches played; W = Matches won; D = Matches drawn; L = Matches lost; GF = Goals for; GA = Goals against; GD = Goal difference; Pts = Points

==== Results by round ====
Round	1	2	3	4	5	6	7	8	9	10	11	12	13	14	15	16	17	18	19	20	21	22	23	24	25	26	27	28	29	30	31	32	33	34
Ground	H	A	H	A	H	A	H	A	H	A	H	H	A	H	A	H	A	A	H	A	H	A	H	A	H	A	H	A	A	H	A	H	A	H
Result	D	W	W	W	W	L	W	W	W	W	W	W																						
Position	9	2	1	1	1	2	1	1	1	1	1	1																						
Points	1	4	7	10	13	13	16	19	22	25	28	31																						

Updated to match(es) played on 21 November 2026. Source: TFF.org
A = Away; H = Home; B = Bye; W = Win; D = Draw; L = Loss

==== Score overview ====
Win Draw Loss

Opposition	Home score	Away score	Aggregate score	Double
Alanyaspor				
Amedspor	4–3			
Beşiktaş				
Çaykur Rizespor				
Çorum	2–2			No
Erzurumspor		4–0		
Eyüpspor				
Fenerbahçe	2–1			
Gaziantep				
Gençlerbirliği		1–0		
Göztepe	3–2			
İstanbul Başakşehir		3–2		
Kasımpaşa	3–1			
Kocaelispor	1–0			
Konyaspor		4–0		
Samsunspor	2–1			
Trabzonspor		0–4		No

==== Matches ====
The league fixtures were announced on 9 July 2026.

Win Draw Loss Postponed

14 August 2026 1	Galatasaray	2–2	Çorum	Sarıyer
21:30 TRT (UTC+3)	Akgün (yellow card) 32'; Osimhen 53', 90'	Report 1 Report 2 Report 3	Kyziridis 59', (red card) 70'; Ramírez 61'	Stadium: Rams Park; Attendance: 44,391; Referee: Batuhan Kolak; Assistant referees: Furkan Ürün, Suat Güz; Fourth official: Asen Albayrak

21 August 2026 2	Erzurumspor	0–4	Galatasaray	Erzurum
21:30 TRT (UTC+3)	Akhundzade (yellow card) 84'	Report 1 Report 2 Report 3	Sallai 12'; Akgün 20'; Osimhen 45', 80'	Stadium: Kazım Karabekir Stadium; Attendance: 20,347; Referee: Çağdaş Altay; Assistant referees: Bersan Duran, Selim Şenöz; Fourth official: Melih Aldemir

29 August 2026 3	Galatasaray	3–2	Göztepe	Sarıyer
21:30 TRT (UTC+3)	Sánchez 33'; Sara 55'; Osimhen 63' (pen.); Yılmaz (yellow card) 70'; Elmalı (yellow card) 90+4'	Report 1 Report 2 Report 3	Miroshi 17'; Henrique (yellow card) 36'; Bokele (yellow card) 62'; Juan 66'	Stadium: Rams Park; Attendance: 49,218; Referee: Mehmet Türkmen; Assistant referees: Ceyhun Sesigüzel, Abdullah Bora Özkara; Fourth official: Ayberk Demirbaş

4 September 2026 4	İstanbul Başakşehir	2–3	Galatasaray	Istanbul
20:00 TRT (UTC+3)	Opéri (yellow card) 37'; Shomurodov 66' (pen.); Sánchez 76' (o.g.); Bozok (red card) 79'; Kharebashvili (yellow card) 90'	Report 1 Report 2 Report 3	Osimhen 17'; Sallai (yellow card) 65'; Sánchez (yellow card) 66'; Torreira 71'; Leão (yellow card) 78'; Sara 90+1'	Stadium: Başakşehir Fatih Terim Stadium; Attendance: 9,743; Referee: Kadir Sağlam; Assistant referees: Mehmet Kısal, Esat Sancaktar; Fourth official: Fatih Tokail

13 September 2026 5	Galatasaray	1–0	Kocaelispor	Sarıyer
20:00 TRT (UTC+3)	Gül (yellow card) 56'; Bardakcı 71', (yellow card) 72'; Sallai (yellow card) 90+3'	Report 1 Report 2 Report 3	Dijksteel (yellow card) 21'	Stadium: Rams Park; Attendance: 48,180; Referee: Atilla Karaoğlan; Assistant referees: Gökhan Barcın, Bilal Gölen; Fourth official: Ömer Faruk Gültekin

19 September 2026 6	Trabzonspor	4–0	Galatasaray	Trabzon
20:00 TRT (UTC+3)	Salah 4', 44', 80', (yellow card) 81'; Saviolo 39'; Muçi (yellow card) 47'; Savić (yellow card) 71'; Onana (yellow card) 82'	Report 1 Report 2 Report 3	Buruk (red card) 72'; Ugochukwu (red card) 86'; Sané (yellow card) 90+3'	Stadium: Papara Park; Attendance: 39,997; Referee: Batuhan Kolak; Assistant referees: İbrahim Çağlar Uyarcan, Candaş Elbil; Fourth official: Gürcan Hasova

9 October 2026 7	Galatasaray	3–1	Kasımpaşa	Sarıyer
20:00 TRT (UTC+3)	Leão (yellow card) 3'; Sánchez (yellow card) 40'; Bardakcı 45'; Torreira (red card) 63'; Yılmaz 90'; Lemina 90+5'	Report 1 Report 2 Report 3	Mendes (yellow card) 25'; Demirbay (yellow card) 27'; Kol (yellow card) 51'; Baldursson (yellow card) 56'; Rak-Sakyi 68'	Stadium: Rams Park; Attendance: 44,286; Referee: Halil Umut Meler; Assistant referees: Bersan Duran, Murat Temel; Fourth official: Muhammet Ali Metoğlu

17 October 2026 8	Gençlerbirliği	0–1	Galatasaray	Ankara
16:00 TRT (UTC+3)		Report 1 Report 2 Report 3	Gül 88'; Osimhen (yellow card) 90'	Stadium: Eryaman Stadium; Attendance: 15,568; Referee: Reşat Onur Coşkunses; Assistant referees: Murat Altan, Hüseyin Aylak; Fourth official: Ömer Faruk Gültekin

26 October 2026 9	Galatasaray	2–1	Fenerbahçe	Sarıyer
21:30 TRT (UTC+3)	Sánchez (yellow card) 19'; Osimhen 29', 44'; Buruk (yellow card); Leão (yellow card) 89'; Sallai (yellow card) End of the match'; Bardakcı (red card) End of the match'	Report 1 Report 2 Report 3	Kahveci (yellow card) 10', (goal) 62'; Škriniar (yellow card) 12'; Kanté (yellow card) 31'; Semedo (yellow card) 54'; Aktürkoğlu (yellow card) End of the match'; Brown (red card) End of the match'	Stadium: Rams Park; Attendance: 52,633; Referee: Atilla Karaoğlan; Assistant referees: Ceyhun Sesigüzel, Süleyman Özay; Fourth official: Abdullah Buğra Taşkınsoy

30 October 2026 10	Konyaspor	0–4	Galatasaray	Konya
20:00 TRT (UTC+3)	Türüç (yellow card) 45'; Jevtović (yellow card) 90'	Report 1 Report 2 Report 2	Osimhen 12'; Akgün 28'; Sara (yellow card) 31'; Batrakov 49'; Leão 55' (pen.)	Stadium: Konya Metropolitan Municipality Stadium; Attendance: 24,594; Referee: Cihan Aydın; Assistant referees: Anıl Usta, Mehmet Salih Mazlum; Fourth official: Ömer Tolga Güldibi

7 November 2026 11	Galatasaray	4–3	Amedspor	Sarıyer
19:00 TRT (UTC+3)	Leão 7'; Lafont 45' (o.g.); Batrakov 59'; Yılmaz 80'	Report 1 Report 2 Report 3	Raveloson (yellow card) 50'; Orban (yellow card) 61', (goal) 65'; Saba 62'; Bates (yellow card) 74'; Sor 90+2'	Stadium: Rams Park; Attendance: 52,240; Referee: Halil Umut Meler; Assistant referees: İbrahim Çağlar Uyarcan, Abdullah Bora Özkara; Fourth official: Kadir Sağlam

21 November 2026 12	Galatasaray	2–1	Samsunspor	Istanbul
16:00 TRT (UTC+3)	Torreira 4'; Yılmaz (yellow card) 33'; Akgün 53'; Lemina (yellow card) 77'; Buruk (yellow card) End of the match' (yellow-red card) End of the match'	Report 1 Report 2 Report 3	Mendes (yellow card) 33'; Bayo 57'	Stadium: Başakşehir Fatih Terim Stadium; Referee: Ali Şansalan; Assistant referees: Mehmet Kısal, Osman Gökhan Bilir; Fourth official: Fatih Tokail

30 November 2026 13	Beşiktaş	v	Galatasaray	Istanbul
21:00 TRT (UTC+3)		Report 1 Report 2		Stadium: Beşiktaş Stadium

4 December 2026 14	Galatasaray	v	Çaykur Rizespor	Sarıyer
20:00 TRT (UTC+3)		Report 1 Report 2		Stadium: Rams Park

12 December 2026 15	Eyüpspor	v	Galatasaray	Istanbul
19:00 TRT (UTC+3)		Report 1 Report 2		Stadium: Recep Tayyip Erdoğan Stadium

19 December 2026 16	Galatasaray	v	Alanyaspor	Sarıyer
19:00 TRT (UTC+3)		Report 1 Report 2		Stadium: Rams Park

17	Gaziantep	v	Galatasaray	Gaziantep
		Report 1 Report 2		Stadium: Gaziantep Stadium

18	Çorum	v	Galatasaray	Çorum
		Report 1 Report 2		Stadium: Çorum City Stadium

19	Galatasaray	v	Erzurumspor	Sarıyer
		Report 1 Report 2		Stadium: Rams Park

20	Göztepe	v	Galatasaray	İzmir
		Report 1 Report 2		Stadium: Gürsel Aksel Stadium

21	Galatasaray	v	İstanbul Başakşehir	Sarıyer
		Report 1 Report 2		Stadium: Rams Park

22	Kocaelispor	v	Galatasaray	Kocaeli
		Report 1 Report 2		Stadium: Kocaeli Stadium

23	Galatasaray	v	Trabzonspor	Sarıyer
		Report 1 Report 2		Stadium: Rams Park

24	Kasımpaşa	v	Galatasaray	Istanbul
		Report 1 Report 2		Stadium: Recep Tayyip Erdoğan Stadium

25	Galatasaray	v	Gençlerbirliği	Sarıyer
		Report 1 Report 2		Stadium: Rams Park

26	Fenerbahçe	v	Galatasaray	Istanbul
		Report 1 Report 2		Stadium: Şükrü Saracoğlu Stadium

27	Galatasaray	v	Konyaspor	Sarıyer
		Report 1 Report 2		Stadium: Rams Park

28	Amedspor	v	Galatasaray	Diyarbakır
		Report 1 Report 2		Stadium: Diyarbakır Stadium

29	Samsunspor	v	Galatasaray	Samsun
		Report 1 Report 2		Stadium: Samsun 19 Mayıs Stadium

30	Galatasaray	v	Beşiktaş	Sarıyer
		Report 1 Report 2		Stadium: Rams Park

31	Çaykur Rizespor	v	Galatasaray	Rize
		Report 1 Report 2		Stadium: Rize City Stadium

32	Galatasaray	v	Eyüpspor	Sarıyer
		Report 1 Report 2		Stadium: Rams Park

33	Alanyaspor	v	Galatasaray	Alanya
		Report 1 Report 2		Stadium: Alanya Oba Stadium

34	Galatasaray	v	Gaziantep	Sarıyer
		Report 1 Report 2		Stadium: Rams Park

=== UEFA Champions League ===
As the champions of the Süper Lig, Galatasaray entered the UEFA Champions League in the league phase.

==== League phase ====
The league phase draw was held on 27 August 2026.

Galatasaray were drawn against Barcelona, Paris Saint-Germain, Aston Villa, Sporting CP, Feyenoord, Lille, VfB Stuttgart and AEK Athens.

Pos	Team	Pld	W	D	L	GF	GA	GD	Pts	Qualification
16	(Austria) LASK	4	2	0	2	10	9	+1	6	Advance to knockout phase play-offs (seeded)
17	(England) Manchester United	4	2	0	2	8	8	0	6	Advance to knockout phase play-offs (unseeded)
18	(Turkey) Galatasaray	4	2	0	2	8	9	−1	6	Advance to knockout phase play-offs (unseeded)
19	(Turkey) Fenerbahçe	4	1	2	1	6	11	−5	5	Advance to knockout phase play-offs (unseeded)
20	(Italy) Roma	4	1	1	2	10	8	+2	4	Advance to knockout phase play-offs (unseeded)

Updated to match(es) played on 4 November 2026. Source: UEFA
Rules for classification: League phase tiebreakers

===== Results summary =====
Overall								Home						Away					
Pld	W	D	L	GF	GA	GD	Pts	W	D	L	GF	GA	GD	W	D	L	GF	GA	GD
4	2	0	2	8	9	−1	6	1	0	1	3	4	−1	1	0	1	5	5	0

Last updated: 3 November 2026.
Source: UEFA

===== Results by round =====
Round	1	2	3	4	5	6	7	8
Ground	A	H	A	H	H	A	H	A
Result	L	L	W	W				
Position	29	35	23	18				
Points	0	0	3	6				

Updated to match(es) played on 3 November 2026. Source: UEFA
A = Away; H = Home; W = Win; D = Draw; L = Loss; P = Postponed

===== Matches =====
9 September 2026 1	Sporting CP (Portuguese Football Federation)	3–1	(Turkish Football Federation) Galatasaray	Lisbon, Portugal
21:00 (20:00 UTC+1)	Altimira (yellow card) 22'; Catamo 27'; Suárez (yellow card) 44', (goal) 57' (pen.); Zalazar 63'	Report 1 Report 2 Report 3	Inácio 5' (o.g.); Elmalı (yellow card) 52'; Gül (yellow card) 80'; Buruk (yellow card) 83'; Jakobs (yellow card) 90+5'	Stadium: Estádio José Alvalade; Attendance: 44,054; Referee: Espen Eskås (Norway); Assistant referees: Jan Erik Engan (Norway), Alf Olav Rossland (Norway); Fourth official: Sigurd Kringstad (Norway); Man of the Match: Zalazar

13 October 2026 2	Galatasaray (Turkish Football Federation)	1–4	(Royal Spanish Football Federation) Barcelona	Sarıyer, Istanbul, Turkey
22:00 TRT (UTC+3)	Batrakov 28'; Leão (yellow card) 64'; Sallai (yellow card) 86'	Report 1 Report 2 Report 3	Cancelo 43'; López 50'; Gordon 53'; Adeyemi 65'	Stadium: Rams Park; Attendance: 49,623; Referee: Marco Guida (Italy); Assistant referees: Giorgio Peretti (Italy), Giuseppe Perrotti (Italy); Fourth official: Fabio Maresca (Italy); Man of the Match: Yamal

21 October 2026 3	Lille (French Football Federation)	2–4	(Turkish Football Federation) Galatasaray	Villeneuve-d'Ascq, Nord, France
19:45 TRT (UTC+3)	Diaoune 7', 39'; Bentaleb (yellow card) 21'; André (yellow card) 59'; Perrin (yellow card) 89'	Report 1 Report 2 Report 3	Akgün 2'; Batrakov 44'; Bentaleb 52' (o.g.); Osimhen 61'; Jakobs (yellow card) 85'	Stadium: Stade Pierre-Mauroy; Attendance: 44,142; Referee: Rade Obrenovič (Slovenia); Assistant referees: Jure Praprotnik (Slovenia), Matej Žunič (Slovenia); Fourth official: Martin Matoša (Slovenia); Man of the Match: Osimhen

3 November 2026 4	Galatasaray (Turkish Football Federation)	2–0	(German Football Association) VfB Stuttgart	Sarıyer, Istanbul, Turkey
20:45 TRT (UTC+3)	Batrakov 12', 15'; Yılmaz (yellow card) 38'; Sallai (yellow card) 62'; Torreira (yellow card) 85'	Report 1 Report 2 Report 3	Karazor (yellow card) 2'; Undav (yellow card) 38'; Spalt (yellow card) 45+2'; Prömel (yellow card) 61'; Hendriks (yellow card) 79'	Stadium: Rams Park; Attendance: 45,162; Referee: Chris Kavanagh (England); Assistant referees: Gary Beswick (England), Adam Nunn (England); Fourth official: Sam Barrott (England); Man of the Match: Batrakov

24 November 2026 5	Galatasaray (Turkish Football Federation)	v	(The Football Association) Aston Villa	Sarıyer, Istanbul, Turkey
20:45 TRT (UTC+3)		Report 1 Report 2		Stadium: Rams Park; Referee: Daniel Siebert (Germany); Assistant referees: Jan Seidel (Germany), Rafael Foltyn (Germany); Fourth official: Florian Badstübner (Germany)

8 December 2026 6	AEK Athens (Hellenic Football Federation)	v	(Turkish Football Federation) Galatasaray	Nea Filadelfeia, Athens, Greece
		Report 1 Report 2		Stadium: Agia Sophia Stadium

19 January 2027 7	Galatasaray (Turkish Football Federation)	v	(Royal Dutch Football Association) Feyenoord	Sarıyer, Istanbul, Turkey
		Report 1 Report 2		Stadium: Rams Park

27 January 2027 8	Paris Saint-Germain (French Football Federation)	v	(Turkish Football Federation) Galatasaray	Paris, France
		Report 1 Report 2		Stadium: Parc des Princes

== Statistics ==
=== Overall ===
Includes all competitions for senior teams.

No.	Pos.	Nat.	Player	Süper Lig		Turkish Cup		Turkish Super Cup		Champions League		Total		Discipline		Notes
No.	Pos.	Nat.	Player	Apps	Goals	Apps	Goals	Apps	Goals	Apps	Goals	Apps	Goals	Yellow card	Red card	Notes
Goalkeepers
1	GK	(Turkey)	Uğurcan Çakır	12	0	0	0	0	0	4	0	16	0	0	0	
19	GK	(Turkey)	Günay Güvenç	0	0	0	0	0	0	0	0	0	0	0	0	
24	GK	(Turkey)	Jankat Yılmaz	1	0	0	0	0	0	0	0	1	0	0	0	
50	GK	(Turkey)	Enes Emre Büyük	0	0	0	0	0	0	0	0	0	0	0	0	
Defenders
3	DF	(France)	El Chadaille Bitshiabu	1	0	0	0	0	0	0	0	1	0	0	0	
4	DF	(Senegal)	Ismail Jakobs	11	0	0	0	0	0	4	0	15	0	2	0	
6	DF	(Colombia)	Davinson Sánchez	12	1	0	0	0	0	4	0	16	1	3	0	
17	DF	(Turkey)	Eren Elmalı	13	0	0	0	0	0	4	0	17	0	2	0	
23	DF	(Turkey)	Kaan Ayhan	2	0	0	0	0	0	0	0	2	0	0	0	
42	DF	(Turkey)	Abdülkerim Bardakcı	10	2	0	0	0	0	2	0	12	2	1	1	
88	DF	(Turkey)	Kazımcan Karataş	4	0	0	0	0	0	0	0	4	0	0	0	
90	DF	(Ivory Coast)	Wilfried Singo	6	0	0	0	0	0	1	0	7	0	0	0	
91	DF	(Turkey)	Arda Ünyay	0	0	0	0	0	0	0	0	0	0	0	0	
Midfielders
5	MF	(Germany)	Eyüp Aydın	0	0	0	0	0	0	0	0	0	0	0	0	
7	MF	(Hungary)	Roland Sallai	11	1	0	0	0	0	4	0	15	1	5	0	
8	MF	(Brazil)	Gabriel Sara	12	2	0	0	0	0	4	0	16	2	1	0	
10	MF	(Germany)	Leroy Sané	12	0	0	0	0	0	4	0	16	0	1	0	
11	MF	(Turkey)	Yunus Akgün	13	3	0	0	0	0	4	1	17	4	1	0	
18	MF	(France)	Lesley Ugochukwu	6	0	0	0	0	0	2	0	8	0	0	1	
20	MF	(Germany)	İlkay Gündoğan	4	0	0	0	0	0	2	0	6	0	0	0	
27	MF	(Portugal)	Rafael Leão	9	2	0	0	0	0	3	0	12	2	4	0	
29	MF	(Argentina)	Armando Güner	0	0	0	0	0	0	0	0	0	0	0	0	
34	MF	(Uruguay)	Lucas Torreira	12	2	0	0	0	0	4	0	16	2	1	1	
53	MF	(Turkey)	Barış Alper Yılmaz	12	2	0	0	0	0	4	0	16	2	3	0	
74	MF	(Guinea-Bissau)	Renato Nhaga	4	0	0	0	0	0	2	0	6	0	0	0	
83	MF	(Russia)	Aleksey Batrakov	11	2	0	0	0	0	4	4	15	6	0	0	
98	MF	(Turkey)	Berat Luş	0	0	0	0	0	0	0	0	0	0	0	0	
99	MF	(Gabon)	Mario Lemina	10	1	0	0	0	0	3	0	13	1	1	0	
Forwards
21	FW	(Turkey)	Deniz Gül	8	1	0	0	0	0	2	0	10	1	2	0	
45	FW	(Nigeria)	Victor Osimhen	8	9	0	0	0	0	3	1	11	10	1	0	
62	FW	(Turkey)	Ada Yüzgeç	0	0	0	0	0	0	0	0	0	0	0	0	
No longer with club

Last updated: 21 November 2026
Source: FBref.com, Mackolik.com

=== Goalscorers ===
Includes all competitions for senior teams. The list is sorted by squad number when season-total goals are equal. Players with no goals not included in the list.

Rank	No.	Pos.	Nat.	Player	Süper Lig	Turkish Cup	Turkish Super Cup	Champions League	Total
1	45	FW	(Nigeria)	Victor Osimhen	9	—	—	1	10
2	83	MF	(Russia)	Aleksey Batrakov	2	—	—	4	6
3	11	MF	(Turkey)	Yunus Akgün	3	—	—	1	4
4	8	MF	(Brazil)	Gabriel Sara	2	—	—	0	2
4	27	MF	(Portugal)	Rafael Leão	2	—	—	0	2
4	34	MF	(Uruguay)	Lucas Torreira	2	—	—	0	2
4	42	DF	(Turkey)	Abdülkerim Bardakcı	2	—	—	0	2
4	53	MF	(Turkey)	Barış Alper Yılmaz	2	—	—	0	2
5	6	DF	(Colombia)	Davinson Sánchez	1	—	—	0	1
5	7	MF	(Hungary)	Roland Sallai	1	—	—	0	1
5	21	FW	(Turkey)	Deniz Gül	1	—	—	0	1
5	99	MF	(Gabon)	Mario Lemina	1	—	—	0	1
Own goals					1	—	—	2	3
Totals					29	—	—	8	37

Last updated: 21 November 2026.
Source: FBref.com, Mackolik.com

=== Assists ===
Includes all competitions for senior teams. The list is sorted by squad number when season-total assists are equal. Players with no assists not included in the list.

Rank	No.	Pos.	Nat.	Player	Süper Lig	Turkish Cup	Turkish Super Cup	Champions League	Total
1	8	MF	(Brazil)	Gabriel Sara	6	—	—	0	6
2	34	MF	(Uruguay)	Lucas Torreira	3	—	—	0	3
2	45	FW	(Nigeria)	Victor Osimhen	3	—	—	0	3
2	83	MF	(Russia)	Aleksey Batrakov	3	—	—	0	3
3	6	DF	(Colombia)	Davinson Sánchez	1	—	—	1	2
3	7	MF	(Hungary)	Roland Sallai	1	—	—	1	2
3	53	MF	(Turkey)	Barış Alper Yılmaz	1	—	—	1	2
4	4	DF	(Senegal)	Ismail Jakobs	1	—	—	0	1
4	11	MF	(Turkey)	Yunus Akgün	1	—	—	0	1
4	27	MF	(Portugal)	Rafael Leão	0	—	—	1	1
4	90	DF	(Ivory Coast)	Wilfried Singo	1	—	—	0	1
Totals					21	—	—	4	25

Last updated: 21 November 2026.
Source: FBref.com, Mackolik.com

=== Clean sheets ===
Includes all competitions for senior teams. The list is sorted by squad number when season-total clean sheets are equal. Numbers in parentheses represent games where both goalkeepers participated and both kept a clean sheet; the number in parentheses is awarded to the goalkeeper who was substituted on, whilst a full clean sheet is awarded to the goalkeeper who was on the field at the start of play. Goalkeepers with no clean sheets not included in the list.

Rank	No.	Pos.	Nat.	Player	Süper Lig	Turkish Cup	Turkish Super Cup	Champions League	Total
1	1	GK	(Turkey)	Uğurcan Çakır	4	—	—	1	5
2	24	GK	(Turkey)	Jankat Yılmaz	0	—	—	0	0
Totals					4	—	—	1	5

Last updated: 21 November 2026.
Source: FBref.com, Mackolik.com

=== Disciplinary record ===
Includes all competitions for senior teams. The list is sorted by red cards, then yellow cards (and by squad number when total cards are equal). Players with no cards not included in the list.

No.	Pos.	Nat.	Player	Süper Lig			Turkish Cup			Turkish Super Cup			Champions League			Total		
No.	Pos.	Nat.	Player	Yellow card	(yellow card) (yellow-red card)	Red card	Yellow card	(yellow card) (yellow-red card)	Red card	Yellow card	(yellow card) (yellow-red card)	Red card	Yellow card	(yellow card) (yellow-red card)	Red card	Yellow card	(yellow card) (yellow-red card)	Red card
4	DF	(Senegal)	Ismail Jakobs	0	0	0	—	—	—	—	—	—	2	0	0	2	0	0
6	DF	(Colombia)	Davinson Sánchez	3	0	0	—	—	—	—	—	—	0	0	0	3	0	0
7	MF	(Hungary)	Roland Sallai	3	0	0	—	—	—	—	—	—	2	0	0	5	0	0
8	MF	(Brazil)	Gabriel Sara	1	0	0	—	—	—	—	—	—	0	0	0	1	0	0
10	MF	(Germany)	Leroy Sané	1	0	0	—	—	—	—	—	—	0	0	0	1	0	0
11	MF	(Turkey)	Yunus Akgün	1	0	0	—	—	—	—	—	—	0	0	0	1	0	0
17	DF	(Turkey)	Eren Elmalı	1	0	0	—	—	—	—	—	—	1	0	0	2	0	0
18	MF	(France)	Lesley Ugochukwu	0	0	1	—	—	—	—	—	—	0	0	0	0	0	1
21	FW	(Turkey)	Deniz Gül	1	0	0	—	—	—	—	—	—	1	0	0	2	0	0
27	MF	(Portugal)	Rafael Leão	3	0	0	—	—	—	—	—	—	1	0	0	4	0	0
34	MF	(Uruguay)	Lucas Torreira	0	0	1	—	—	—	—	—	—	1	0	0	1	0	1
42	DF	(Turkey)	Abdülkerim Bardakcı	1	0	1	—	—	—	—	—	—	0	0	0	1	0	1
45	FW	(Nigeria)	Victor Osimhen	1	0	0	—	—	—	—	—	—	0	0	0	1	0	0
53	MF	(Turkey)	Barış Alper Yılmaz	2	0	0	—	—	—	—	—	—	1	0	0	3	0	0
99	MF	(Gabon)	Mario Lemina	1	0	0	—	—	—	—	—	—	0	0	0	1	0	0
Coach		(Turkey)	Okan Buruk	1	1	1	—	—	—	—	—	—	1	0	0	2	1	1
Totals				20	1	4	—	—	—	—	—	—	10	0	0	30	1	4

Last updated: 21 November 2026
Source: FBref.com, Mackolik.com
Ordered by (red card) , (second yellow card) and (yellow card)
(yellow card) = Number of bookings; (second yellow card) = Number of sending offs after a second yellow card; (red card) = Number of sending offs by a direct red card.

=== Game as captain ===
Includes all competitions for senior teams. The list is sorted by squad number when season-total number of games where a player started as captain are equal. Players with no games started as captain not included in the list.

Rank	No.	Pos.	Nat.	Player	Süper Lig	Turkish Cup	Turkish Super Cup	Champions League	Total
1	42	DF	(Turkey)	Abdülkerim Bardakcı	9	—	—	2	11
2	11	MF	(Turkey)	Yunus Akgün	3	—	—	2	5
Totals					12	—	—	4	16

Last updated: 21 November 2026.
Source: FBref.com, Mackolik.com

== Injury record ==
No.	Pos.	Nat.	Player	Type	Status	Source	Match	Inj. Date	Ret. Date	Injured days
19	GK	(Turkey)	Günay Güvenç	Partial muscle tear		sabah.com.tr	in training	13 August 2026	20 September 2026	38
90	DF	(Ivory Coast)	Wilfried Singo	Muscle injury		Galatasaray.org; Galatasaray.org	in training	3 September 2026	18 October 2026	45
45	FW	(Nigeria)	Victor Osimhen	Groin injury		Galatasaray.org	vs İstanbul Başakşehir	4 September 2026	6 October 2026	32
99	MF	(Gabon)	Mario Lemina	Adductor injury		Galatasaray.org	vs İstanbul Başakşehir	4 September 2026	30 September 2026	26
7	MF	(Hungary)	Roland Sallai	Torn thigh muscle		aspor.com.tr	vs Trabzonspor	19 September 2026	7 October 2026	18
27	MF	(Portugal)	Rafael Leão	Groin strain		Galatasaray.org	vs Gençlerbirliği	17 October 2026	24 October 2026	7
45	FW	(Nigeria)	Victor Osimhen	Bone splintering		Galatasaray.org; Galatasaray.org	vs VfB Stuttgart	3 November 2026		19
27	MF	(Portugal)	Rafael Leão	Hamstring injury		Galatasaray.org	vs Amedspor	7 November 2026		15
1	GK	(Turkey)	Uğurcan Çakır	Shoulder injury		hurriyet.com.tr	in training	12 November 2026	19 November 2026	7
7	MF	(Hungary)	Roland Sallai	Hamstring muscle injury		Galatasaray.org	in Nations League with Hungary vs Northern Ireland	17 September 2026		5
4	DF	(Senegal)	Ismail Jakobs	Groin injury		Galatasaray.org	in training	19 September 2026		3

- Player is injured
- Player has recovered from injury
Last updated: 20 November 2026
Source: Galatasaray Sports Club

== Attendances ==
As of 03 November 2026

Competition	Total	Games	Average
Süper Lig	290,948	6	48,491
Turkish Cup	–	0	–
Champions League	94,785	2	47,393
Totals	385,733	8	48,217
