= Çağrı Balta =

Turkish footballer (born 2005)

Çağrı Hakan Balta
Personal information
- Date of birth: 18 May 2008 (age 18)
- Place of birth: Istanbul, Türkiye
- Height: 1.84 m (6 ft 0 in)
- Position: Forward

Team information
- Current team: Fenerbahçe
- Number: 99

Youth career
- 2024–2026: Galatasaray U19
- 2026–: Fenerbahçe U19

Senior career*
Years	Team	Apps	(Gls)
2026–	Fenerbahçe	0	(0)

International career
2018	Turkey U16	5	(0)
2022	Turkey U18	2	(0)
- * Club domestic league appearances and goals as of 20 September 2026

Çağrı Hakan Balta (born 18 May 2008) is a Turkish professional footballer who plays as a forward for Süper Lig club Fenerbahçe.

== Club career ==
After beginning his career in the Galatasaray Academy on a youth license, he rejected a contract offer from Galatasaray and transferred to Fenerbahçe in February 2026.

On 25 June 2026, he signed professional contract with Fenerbahçe until the end of 2030–31 season.

He made his first unofficial appearance in a friendly match against Azerbaijani side, Turan Tovuz on 3 October 2026, he also scored second goal of the match.

== International career ==
Balta is a youth international for Turkey and called up to the Turkey U16s and Turkey U18s.

== Personal life ==
His father Hakan Balta was a Turkish international footballer and played for Galatasaray.

== Career statistics ==
As of matches played 20 September 2026

Appearances and goals by club, season and competition
Club	Season	League			Turkish Cup		Continental		Other		Total	
Club	Season	Division	Apps	Goals	Apps	Goals	Apps	Goals	Apps	Goals	Apps	Goals
Galatasaray U19	2024–25	U19 Elit A Ligi	30	22	—		—		—		30	22
Galatasaray U19	2025–26	U19 Elit A Ligi	21	6	0	0	—		—		21	6
Galatasaray U19	Total		51	28	0	0	0	3	0	0	51	28
Fenerbahçe U19	2026–27	U19 Elit A Ligi	2	0	—		—		1 (Note: Appearance(s) in UEFA Youth League)	0	3	0
Fenerbahçe	2026–27	Süper Lig	53	28	0	0	0	0	1	0	53	28
Career total			54	28	0	0	0	3	0	0	54	28

== Honours ==
Fenerbahçe

- Turkish Super Cup: 2025
