= 2026–27 Fenerbahçe S.K. season =

Fenerbahçe 2026/27 season

Fenerbahçe
2026–27 season
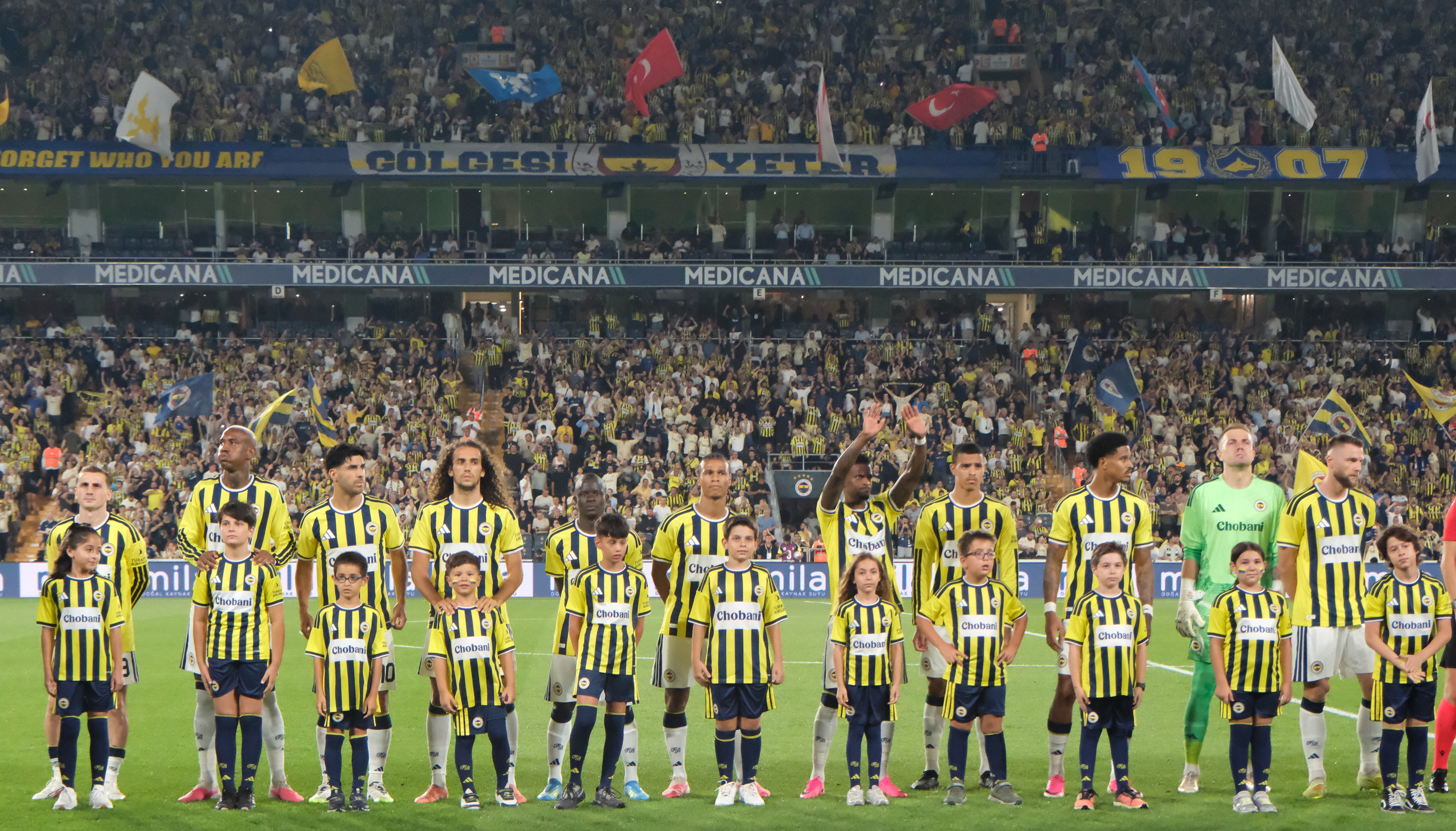
- Pre-match ceremony before the UEFA Champions League third qualifying round first leg against Sturm Graz, 5 August 2026
- President: Aziz Yıldırım
- Head coach: İsmail Kartal (until 27 October); Emre Belözoğlu (from 4 November)
- Stadium: Şükrü Saracoğlu Stadium
- Süper Lig: 6th
- Turkish Cup: Fifth round
- Turkish Super Cup: Semi-finals
- UEFA Champions League: League phase
- Top goalscorer: League: Vedat Muriqi (7); All: Mason Greenwood (10)
Home colours	Away colours	Third colours
- All statistics correct as of 8 November 2026.

The 2026–27 season is the 120th season in the existence of Fenerbahçe and the club's 69th consecutive season in the top flight of Turkish football. In addition to the domestic league, Fenerbahçe are participating in this season's edition of the Turkish Cup, Turkish Super Cup and UEFA Champions League.

== Kits ==
Fenerbahçe's 2026–27 kits, manufactured by Adidas, were unveiled on 3 June 2026 and went on sale on the same day. Former players Gökhan Gönül, Semih Şentürk, Tuncay Şanlı, Mehmet Aurélio, Elvir Bolić, Ogün Temizkanoğlu, Şenol Çorlu, Cem Pamiroğlu, Alpaslan Eradlı and Cemil Turan participated as models in the event.

The 2026–27 kits feature the club's 120th anniversary crest. The collection brings together Fenerbahçe's iconic Çubuklu (striped) home kit, the away kit reflecting the club's noble spirit and a third kit inspired by the General Harington Cup victory. The Çubuklu jersey, embodying the spirit of the club's 120th anniversary, makes a strong reference to Fenerbahçe's historical heritage through its chest sponsor detail framed in white, while presenting its classic design language with a modern interpretation on the pitch.

The away kit features the Adidas Originals logo for the first time in Fenerbahçe's history.

- Supplier: Adidas
- Main sponsor: Otokoç
- Main sponsor (Europe): Chobani
- Side sponsor: Acıbadem
- Back sponsor: Halley
- Sleeve sponsor: Nesine, Cabir Holding
- Sleeve sponsor (Europe): Turkish Airlines
- Shorts sponsor: Asperox, Nata Holding
- Socks sponsor: Gedik Yatırım

Home
Home alt.
Away
Third
Goalkeeper 1
Goalkeeper 2
Goalkeeper 3

== Players ==
=== First team ===
Italic written players are not included in the UEFA Champions League league phase list.
(*) Eligable for Turkish Cup and Turkish Super Cup

N	Pos.	Nat.	Name	Age	Since	App	Goals	Ends	Transfer fee	Notes
Goalkeepers
13	GK	(Turkey)	Tarık Çetin	29	2025	4	0	2029	Free	Originally from youth system
31	GK	(Brazil)	Ederson	33	2025	36	0	2028	€11M	Second nationality: Portuguese
34	GK	(Turkey)	Mert Günok	37	2026 (Winter)	62	0	2028	Free	Originally from youth system
Defenders
3	DF	(England)	Archie Brown	24	2025	39	5	2028	€8M	Second nationality: Jamaican
14	DF	(Turkey)	Yiğit Efe Demir	22	2025	23	0	2029	Academy	Originally from youth system
15	DF	(Netherlands)	Nathan Aké	31	2026	3	0	2029	£7M	Second nationality: Ivorian
18	DF	(Turkey)	Mert Müldür	27	2023	120	5	2027	Free	Second nationality: Austrian
21	DF	(Ghana)	Kojo Peprah Oppong	22	2026	0	0	2030	€12M	Second nationality: French
22	DF	(Turkey)	Levent Mercan	25	2024	40	0	2028	Free	Second nationality: German
24	DF	(Netherlands)	Jayden Oosterwolde (*)	25	2023 (Winter)	108	3	2028	€6M	Other nationalities: Surinamese, Indonesian
27	DF	(Portugal)	Nélson Semedo	32	2025	43	1	2027	Free	Second nationality: Cape Verdean
37	DF	(Slovakia)	Milan Škriniar (Vice-captain)	31	2025 (Winter)	66	5	2029	€7M	
77	DF	(Serbia)	Ognjen Mimović	22	2025 (Winter)	0	0	2029	€5M	
Midfielders
5	MF	(Turkey)	İsmail Yüksek	27	2020	158	4	2028	Free	
6	MF	(France)	Mattéo Guendouzi	27	2026 (Winter)	25	2	2030	€28M	Second nationality: Moroccan
8	MF	(Turkey)	Mert Hakan Yandaş (Captain)	32	2020	149	11	2027	Free	
10	MF	(Spain)	Marco Asensio	30	2025	41	13	2028	€7.5M	Second nationality: Dutch
17	MF	(Turkey)	İrfan Can Kahveci (Vice-captain)	31	2021 (Winter)	186	32	2028	€7M	
28	MF	(Turkey)	Bartuğ Elmaz	23	2023	21	1	2028	€1.4M	
70	MF	(Turkey)	Oğuz Aydın	26	2024	69	7	2028	€6.5M	Second nationality: Dutch
91	MF	(France)	N'Golo Kanté	35	2026 (Winter)	19	2	2028	Free	Second nationality: Malian
Forwards
7	FW	(Turkey)	Kerem Aktürkoğlu	28	2025	47	15	2029	€22.50M	
9	FW	(Belgium)	Romelu Lukaku	33	2026	0	0	2028	€6M	Second nationality: Congolese
11	FW	(England)	Mason Greenwood	25	2026	3	1	2030	€39M	Second nationality: Jamaican
19	FW	(Kosovo)	Vedat Muriqi	32	2026	36	17	2029	Undisclosed	Other nationalities: Albanian, Turkish
30	FW	(Senegal)	Amara Diouf (*)	18	2026	0	0	2031	Undisclosed	
45	FW	(Mali)	Dorgeles Nene	23	2025	39	11	2030	€18M	Second nationality: Ivorian

- Last updated: 3 September 2026
- Source: Fenerbahce.org
- Ordered by squad number.

=== Academy Players ===
Italic written players are not included in the UEFA Champions League league phase list B.

N	Pos.	Nat.	Name	Age	Since	App	Goals	Ends	Transfer fee	Notes
Goalkeepers
75	GK	(Turkey)	Kuzey Sapaz	18	2024	0	0	2028	Academy	Professional
89	GK	(Turkey)	Yasir Caklı	17	2022	0	0		Academy	Amateur
Defenders
78	DF	(Turkey)	Çağan Sarıdikmen	17	2019	0	0		Academy	Amateur
82	DF	(Turkey)	Yağız Bedirhan Korkmaz	17	2019	0	0		Academy	Amateur
86	DF	(Turkey)	Gökmen Özdemir	17	2021	0	0		Academy	Amateur
Midfielders
30	MF	(Ghana)	Daniel Asante Amoh	18	2026	0	0	2027	Academy	On loan from Inter Millas F.C.
35	MF	(Turkey)	Adem Yeşilyurt	19	2026	0	0	2030	Academy	Professional
60	MF	(Senegal)	Abdou Aziz Fall	19	2025	0	0	2030	Academy	Professional
80	MF	(Turkey)	Adnan Efe Fettahoğlu	17	2021	0	0	2028	Academy	Professional
83	MF	(Turkey)	Yasir Boz	19	2019	1	0	2031	Academy	Professional
84	MF	(Turkey)	Emin Eren Sayar	17	2022	0	0	2028	Academy	Professional
85	MF	(Turkey)	Güner Ekici	17	2019	0	0	2028	Academy	Amateur
90	MF	(Turkey)	Emirhan Ateş	17	2022	0	0	2028	Academy	Amateur
Forwards
54	FW	(Turkey)	Alaettin Ekici	17	2019	5	0	2028	Academy	Professional
99	FW	(Turkey)	Çağrı Balta	18	2026	0	0	2031	Academy	Professional

- Last updated: 3 September 2026
- Source: Fenerbahce.org
- Ordered by squad number.

== Transfers ==
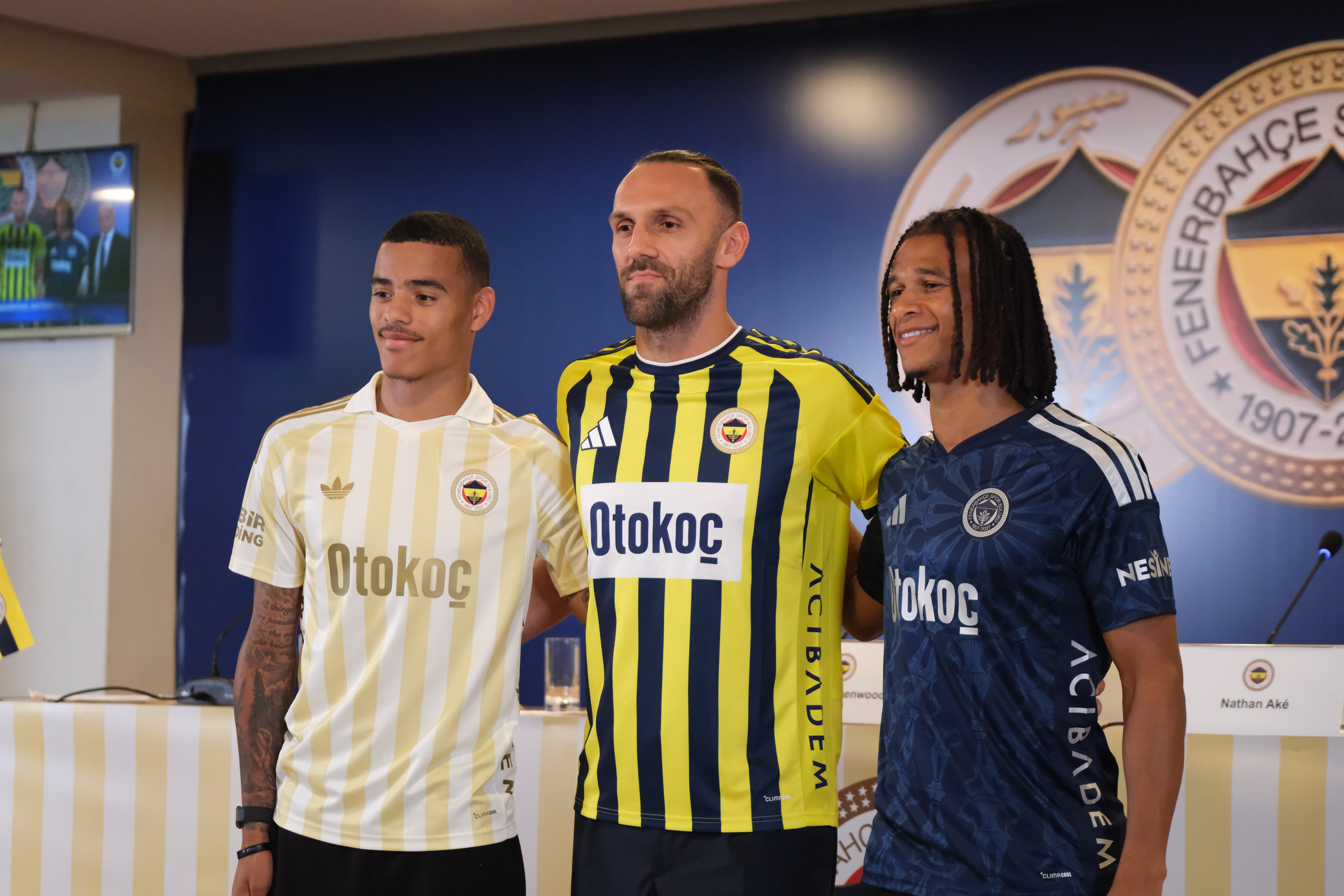
Mason Greenwood, Nathan Aké & Vedat Muriqi at the signing ceremony

=== In ===
No.	Pos.	Player	Transferred from	Fee	Date	Source
19	FW	(Kosovo) Vedat Muriqi	(Spain) Mallorca	€15,500,000	19 June 2026	
—	FW	(Senegal) Amara Diouf	(Senegal) Génération Foot	Undisclosed	24 June 2026	
—	MF	(Morocco) Sofyan Amrabat	(Spain) Real Betis	Loan return	1 July 2026	
—	DF	(Brazil) Diego Carlos	(Italy) Como	Loan return	1 July 2026	
23	FW	(Turkey) Cengiz Ünder	(Turkey) Beşiktaş	Loan return	1 July 2026	
—	GK	(Croatia) Dominik Livaković	(Croatia) Dinamo Zagreb	Loan return	1 July 2026	
17	MF	(Turkey) İrfan Kahveci	(Turkey) Kasımpaşa	Loan return	1 July 2026	
—	DF	(Serbia) Ognjen Mimović	(Cyprus) Pafos	Loan return	1 July 2026	
—	DF	(Brazil) Rodrigo Becão	(Turkey) Kasımpaşa	Loan return	1 July 2026	
—	GK	(Turkey) İrfan Can Eğribayat	(Turkey) Samsunspor	Loan return	1 July 2026	
28	MF	(Turkey) Bartuğ Elmaz	(Turkey) Fatih Karagümrük	Loan return	1 July 2026	
—	DF	(Egypt) Omar Fayed	(Portugal) Arouca	Loan return	1 July 2026	
—	MF	(Turkey) Emre Demir	(Turkey) Sakaryaspor	Loan return	1 July 2026	
26	FW	(Guinea) Sidiki Cherif	(France) Angers	€18,000,000	1 July 2026	
15	DF	(Netherlands) Nathan Aké	(England) Manchester City	£7,000,000	4 July 2026	
11	FW	(England) Mason Greenwood	(France) Marseille	€39,000,000	14 July 2026	
9	FW	(Belgium) Romelu Lukaku	(Italy) Napoli	€6,000,000	12 August 2026	
21	DF	(Ghana) Kojo Peprah Oppong	(France) Nice	€12,000,000	29 August 2026	

Total expenditure: ▼€98.7 million (excluding potential add-ons, bonuses and undisclosed figures)

=== Out ===
No.	Pos.	Player	Transferred to	Fee	Date	Source
—	FW	(Turkey) Emre Mor	(Netherlands) NEC	Free transfer	20 July 2026	
11	MF	(Mexico) Edson Álvarez	(England) West Ham United	Loan return	1 July 2026	
1	MF	(Turkey) İrfan Can Eğribayat	(Turkey) Gençlerbirliği	Mutual agreement	13 August 2026	
7	MF	(Brazil) Fred	(Brazil) Atlético Mineiro	€2,000,000	14 August 2026	
26	FW	(Guinea) Sidiki Cherif	(England) Coventry City	€25,000,000	19 August 2026	
20	FW	(Netherlands) Anthony Musaba	(England) Norwich City	Loan	19 August 2026	
—	DF	(Egypt) Omar Fayed	(Italy) Frosinone	€500,000	19 August 2026	
—	MF	(Turkey) Emre Demir	(Turkey) Alanyaspor	Free transfer	26 August 2026	
—	GK	(Croatia) Dominik Livaković	(Spain) Barcelona	€2,000,000	27 August 2026	
—	FW	(Turkey) Cengiz Ünder	(Turkey) Çorum	Mutual agreement	28 August 2026	
—	MF	(Morocco) Sofyan Amrabat	(Netherlands) Ajax	Mutual agreement	29 August 2026	
—	DF	(Brazil) Diego Carlos	(Italy) Parma	Loan	1 September 2026	
94	FW	(Brazil) Talisca	(United Arab Emirates) Al Jazira	Mutual agreement	3 September 2026	
4	DF	(Turkey) Çağlar Söyüncü	(Turkey) Çorum	Mutual agreement	4 September 2026	
—	DF	(Brazil) Rodrigo Becão	(Russia) Rodina Moscow	Loan	9 September 2026	

Total income: ▲€29.5 million (excluding potential add-ons, bonuses and undisclosed figures)

=== Contract renewals ===
No.	Pos.	Nat.	Player	Age	Status	Contract length	Contract ends	Source
13	GK	(Turkey)	Tarık Çetin	29	Extended	Three-year	30 June 2029	
8	MF	(Turkey)	Mert Hakan Yandaş	31	Extended	One-year	30 June 2027	

== Pre-season and friendlies ==
Win Draw Loss Fixtures

=== Pre-season ===
8 July 2026 Summer Series Upper Austria	Fenerbahçe (Turkey)	5–0	(Austria) Admira Wacker	Linz, Austria
19:30 CEST (UTC+2)	Ünder 9'; Škriniar 42'; Fred 60'; Glitia 70' (o.g.); Becão 75'	Report		Stadium: Raiffeisen Arena; Referee: Julian Weinberger (Austria)

11 July 2026 Friendly	Fenerbahçe (Turkey)	4–0	(Poland) Pogoń Szczecin	Linz, Austria
19:30 CEST (UTC+2)	Ünder 8'; Musaba 23'; Cherif 48', 52'; Oosterwolde (yellow card) 57'	Report		Stadium: Hofmann Personal Stadion; Referee: Stefan Ebner (Austria)

14 July 2026 Summer Series Upper Austria	LASK (Austria)	1–2	(Turkey) Fenerbahçe	Linz, Austria
19:30 CEST (UTC+2)	Jørgensen (yellow card) 5'; Daněk 65'	Report	Kahveci 6'; Guendouzi (yellow card) 53'; Aktürkoğlu 56'	Stadium: Raiffeisen Arena; Referee: Christian-Petru Ciochirca (Romania)

=== Mid-season ===
3 October 2026 Friendly	Turan Tovuz (Azerbaijan)	0–2	(Turkey) Fenerbahçe	Baku, Azerbaijan
20:00 AZT (UTC+4)	Miller (yellow card) 33'; Henrique (yellow card) 54'	Report	Greenwood (red card) 32'; Guendouzi (yellow card) 33'; Kanté 60'; Balta 74'	Stadium: Tofiq Bahramov Republican Stadium; Referee: Rəvan Həmzəzadə (Azerbaijan)

== Competitions ==
=== Overall record ===
Competition	First match	Last match	Starting round	Record							
Competition	First match	Last match	Starting round	Pld	W	D	L	GF	GA	GD	Win %
Süper Lig	15 August 2026	May 2027	Matchday 1	11	6	1	4	29	10	+19	54.55
Turkish Cup	December 2026	TBD	Fifth round	0	0	0	0	0	0	+0	—
Turkish Super Cup	5–6 January 2027	TBD	Semi-finals	0	0	0	0	0	0	+0	—
UEFA Champions League	21 July 2026	TBD	Second qualifying round	10	5	4	1	14	14	+0	50.00
Total				21	11	5	5	43	24	+19	52.38

Last updated: 8 November 2026
Source: Competitions

=== Süper Lig ===
==== League table ====
Pos	Team	Pld	W	D	L	GF	GA	GD	Pts	Qualification or relegation
4	Kasımpaşa	11	5	5	1	17	11	+6	20	Qualification for the Conference League second qualifying round
5	Beşiktaş	11	7	1	3	23	12	+11	22	
6	Fenerbahçe	11	6	1	4	29	10	+19	19	
7	Kocaelispor	11	6	1	4	13	9	+4	19	
8	Başakşehir	11	5	2	4	19	17	+2	17	

Updated to match(es) played on 8 November 2026. Source: Süper Lig
Rules for classification: 1) Points; 2) Head-to-head points; 3) Head-to-head goal difference; 4) Head-to-head goals scored; 5) Goal difference; 6) Goals scored; 7) Play-off.
(Note: Head-to-head record is used only after all the matches between the teams in question have been played)

==== Results summary ====
Overall								Home						Away					
Pld	W	D	L	GF	GA	GD	Pts	W	D	L	GF	GA	GD	W	D	L	GF	GA	GD
11	6	1	4	29	10	+19	19	3	0	2	17	6	+11	3	1	2	12	4	+8

Last updated: 8 November 2026.
Source: TFF.org

Pld = Matches played; W = Matches won; D = Matches drawn; L = Matches lost; GF = Goals for; GA = Goals against; GD = Goal difference; Pts = Points

==== Results by round ====
Round	1	2	3	4	5	6	7	8	9	10	11	12	13	14	15	16	17	18	19	20	21	22	23	24	25	26	27	28	29	30	31	32	33	34
Ground	A	H	A	H	A	H	A	H	A	H	A	A	H	A	H	A	H	H	A	H	A	H	A	H	A	H	A	H	H	A	H	A	H	A
Result	L	W	W	L	D	W	W	W	L	L	W																							
Position	14	8	4	9	11	6	4	3	5	6	6																							

Updated to match(es) played on 8 November 2026. Source: TFF.org
A = Away; H = Home; W = Win; D = Draw; L = Loss; P = Postponed

==== Matches ====
The league fixtures were announced on 9 July 2026.

15 August 2026 1	Gençlerbirliği	2–1	Fenerbahçe	Ankara
21:30 TRT (UTC+3)	Tongya 37'; Ülgün 56'	Report	Talisca 13'; Aktürkoğlu (yellow card) 58'	Stadium: Eryaman Stadium; Referee: Oğuzhan Aksu

22 August 2026 2	Fenerbahçe	4–2	Konyaspor	Istanbul
21:30 TRT (UTC+3)	Muriqi 7'; Greenwood 20', 49'; Asensio 33'	Report	Colley 11'; Türüç (yellow card) 45+3', (goal) 90+4'; Demirbağ (yellow card) 45+3'; Bardhi (yellow card) 61'	Stadium: Şükrü Saracoğlu Stadium; Referee: Atilla Karaoğlan

30 August 2026 3	Samsunspor	0–2	Fenerbahçe	Samsun
21:30 TRT (UTC+3)		Report	Muriqi 3'; Aydin 49'; Lukaku (yellow card) 70'	Stadium: Samsun 19 Mayıs Stadium; Referee: Yasin Kol

5 September 2026 4	Fenerbahçe	1–2	Beşiktaş	Istanbul
20:00 TRT (UTC+3)	Škriniar 26', (yellow card) 54'; Greenwood (yellow card) 45+1'; Ederson (yellow card) 54'; Guendouzi (yellow card) 75'	Report	Yılmaz 38'; Topçu (yellow card) 45'; Vlahović (yellow card) 54', (goal) 73'; Černý (yellow card) 58'	Stadium: Şükrü Saracoğlu Stadium; Referee: Halil Umut Meler

14 September 2026 5	Gaziantep	0–0	Fenerbahçe	Gaziantep
20:00 TRT (UTC+3)	Meleke (yellow card) 4'; Kızıldağ (yellow card) 83'; Abena (yellow card) 84'; Hansen (yellow card) 90+2'	Report	Kahveci (yellow card) 83'; Muriqi (yellow card) 83'; Aydın (yellow card) 84'	Stadium: Gaziantep Stadium; Referee: Mehmet Türkmen

20 September 2026 6	Fenerbahçe	8–0	Eyüpspor	Istanbul
17:00 TRT (UTC+3)	Greenwood 4' (pen.), 80'; Muriqi 7', 21', 47', 55'; Guendouzi 38'; Kahveci 45+1'; Lukaku (yellow card) 89'	Report	Yaşar (yellow card) 89'	Stadium: Şükrü Saracoğlu Stadium; Referee: Kadir Sağlam

10 October 2026 7	Çaykur Rizespor	0–3	Fenerbahçe	Rize
19:00 TRT (UTC+3)		Report	Asensio 12'; Kahveci 83'; Aydın 87'	Stadium: Rize City Stadium; Referee: Ozan Ergün

17 October 2026 8	Fenerbahçe	3–0	Alanyaspor	Istanbul
19:00 TRT (UTC+3)	Greenwood (penalty missed) 17'; Lukaku 40'; Aktürkoğlu 71'; Aydın (yellow card) 73'; Muriqi 87'	Report		Stadium: Şükrü Saracoğlu Stadium; Referee: Çağdaş Altay

26 October 2026 9	Galatasaray	2–1	Fenerbahçe	Istanbul
21:30 TRT (UTC+3)	Sánchez (yellow card) 19'; Osimhen 29', 44'; Leão (yellow card) 89'; Bardakcı (red card) FT; Sallai (yellow card) FT	Report	Kahveci (yellow card) 10', (goal) 62'; Škriniar (yellow card) 11'; Kanté (yellow card) 31'; Semedo (yellow card) 54'; Brown (yellow card) 90+1' (red card) FT; Aktürkoğlu (yellow card) FT	Stadium: Rams Park; Referee: Atilla Karaoğlan

31 October 2026 10	Fenerbahçe	1–2	Göztepe	Istanbul
19:00 TRT (UTC+3)	Kanté (yellow card) 3'; Semedo (yellow card) 42'; Guendouzi 45+1'	Report	Antunes (yellow card) 39'; Akonnor (yellow card) 47'; Armstrong 76'; André Henrique 78'; Altıkardeş (yellow card) 89'; Bekiroğlu (yellow card) 90+4'	Stadium: Şükrü Saracoğlu Stadium; Referee: Oğuzhan Çakır

8 November 2026 11	Çorum	0–5	Fenerbahçe	Çorum
16:00 TRT (UTC+3)	Diomande (yellow card) 38'	Report	Greenwood 12', 63'; Kahveci 21', 56'; Semedo (yellow card) 54'; Aydın 74'	Stadium: Çorum City Stadium; Referee: Abdullah Buğra Taşkınsoy

21 November 2026 12	Kocaelispor	v	Fenerbahçe	Kocaeli
19:00 TRT (UTC+3)		Report		Stadium: Kocaeli Stadium

29 November 2026 13	Fenerbahçe	v	Erzurumspor	Istanbul
19:00 TRT (UTC+3)		Report		Stadium: Şükrü Saracoğlu Stadium

5 December 2026 14	İstanbul Başakşehir	v	Fenerbahçe	Istanbul
19:00 TRT (UTC+3)		Report		Stadium: Başakşehir Fatih Terim Stadium

13 December 2026 15	Fenerbahçe	v	Trabzonspor	Istanbul
19:00 TRT (UTC+3)		Report		Stadium: Şükrü Saracoğlu Stadium

18 December 2026 16	Kasımpaşa	v	Fenerbahçe	Istanbul
20:00 TRT (UTC+3)		Report		Stadium: Recep Tayyip Erdoğan Stadium

December 2026 17	Fenerbahçe	v	Amed	Istanbul
--:-- TRT (UTC+3)		Report		Stadium: Şükrü Saracoğlu Stadium

January 2027 18	Fenerbahçe	v	Gençlerbirliği	Istanbul
--:-- TRT (UTC+3)		Report		Stadium: Şükrü Saracoğlu Stadium

January 2027 19	Konyaspor	v	Fenerbahçe	Konya
--:-- TRT (UTC+3)		Report		Stadium: Konya Metropolitan Municipality Stadium

February 2027 20	Fenerbahçe	v	Samsunspor	Istanbul
--:-- TRT (UTC+3)		Report		Stadium: Şükrü Saracoğlu Stadium

February 2027 21	Beşiktaş	v	Fenerbahçe	Istanbul
--:-- TRT (UTC+3)		Report		Stadium: Beşiktaş Stadium

February 2027 22	Fenerbahçe	v	Gaziantep	Istanbul
--:-- TRT (UTC+3)		Report		Stadium: Şükrü Saracoğlu Stadium

February 2027 23	Eyüpspor	v	Fenerbahçe	Istanbul
--:-- TRT (UTC+3)		Report

March 2027 24	Fenerbahçe	v	Çaykur Rizespor	Istanbul
--:-- TRT (UTC+3)		Report		Stadium: Şükrü Saracoğlu Stadium

March 2027 25	Alanyaspor	v	Fenerbahçe	Alanya
--:-- TRT (UTC+3)		Report		Stadium: Alanya Oba Stadium

March 2027 26	Fenerbahçe	v	Galatasaray	Istanbul
--:-- TRT (UTC+3)		Report		Stadium: Şükrü Saracoğlu Stadium

April 2027 27	Göztepe	v	Fenerbahçe	İzmir
--:-- TRT (UTC+3)		Report		Stadium: Gürsel Aksel Stadium

April 2027 28	Fenerbahçe	v	Çorum	Istanbul
--:-- TRT (UTC+3)		Report		Stadium: Şükrü Saracoğlu Stadium

April 2027 29	Fenerbahçe	v	Kocaelispor	Istanbul
--:-- TRT (UTC+3)		Report		Stadium: Şükrü Saracoğlu Stadium

April 2027 30	Erzurumspor	v	Fenerbahçe	Erzurum
--:-- TRT (UTC+3)		Report		Stadium: Kazım Karabekir Stadium

May 2027 31	Fenerbahçe	v	İstanbul Başakşehir	Istanbul
--:-- TRT (UTC+3)		Report		Stadium: Şükrü Saracoğlu Stadium

May 2027 32	Trabzonspor	v	Fenerbahçe	Trabzon
--:-- TRT (UTC+3)		Report		Stadium: Papara Park

May 2027 33	Fenerbahçe	v	Kasımpaşa	Istanbul
--:-- TRT (UTC+3)		Report		Stadium: Şükrü Saracoğlu Stadium

May 2027 34	Amed	v	Fenerbahçe	Diyarbakır
--:-- TRT (UTC+3)		Report		Stadium: Diyarbakır Stadium

=== Turkish Super Cup ===
5–6 January 2027 Semi-finals	Trabzonspor	v	Fenerbahçe
--:-- TRT (UTC+3)

=== UEFA Champions League ===
==== Second qualifying round ====
The draw for the second qualifying round was held on 17 June 2026.

21 July 2026 First leg	Fenerbahçe (Turkey)	1–0	(Poland) Górnik Zabrze	Istanbul, Turkey
21:00 TRT (UTC+3)	Talisca 37'	Report		Stadium: Şükrü Saracoğlu Stadium; Attendance: 38,604; Referee: Manfredas Lukjančukas (Lithuania)

29 July 2026 Second leg	Górnik Zabrze (Poland)	1–1 (1–2 agg.)	(Turkey) Fenerbahçe	Zabrze, Poland
20:00 CEST (UTC+2)	Sadílek (yellow card) 11'; Janža (yellow card) 28'; Sáček 45+10'; Janicki (yellow card) 66'; Josema (yellow card) 70'	Report	Talisca 12' (pen.); Oosterwolde (yellow card) 41'; Semedo (yellow card) 86'; Greenwood (yellow card) 90+1'; Fred (yellow card) 90+2'; Guendouzi (yellow card) 90+3'	Stadium: Arena Zabrze; Attendance: 28,499; Referee: Lothar D'hondt (Belgium)

==== Third qualifying round ====
The draw for the third qualifying round was held on 20 July 2025.

5 August 2026 First leg	Fenerbahçe (Turkey)	2–0	(Austria) Sturm Graz	Istanbul, Turkey
21:00 TRT (UTC+3)	Talisca 9'; Greenwood 45'	Report	Stanković (yellow card) 21'; Heil (yellow card) 58'; Kayombo (yellow card) 65'	Stadium: Şükrü Saracoğlu Stadium; Attendance: 39,800; Referee: Chris Kavanagh (England)

11 August 2026 Second leg	Sturm Graz (Austria)	0–1 (0–3 agg.)	(Turkey) Fenerbahçe	Graz, Austria
20:30 CEST (UTC+2)	Mitchell (yellow card) 84'; Fosso (yellow card) 90+4'	Report	Semedo (yellow card) 40'; Brown (yellow card) 45+1'; Talisca 66' (pen.); Aktürkoğlu (yellow card) 90'	Stadium: Liebenauer Stadium; Attendance: 15,599; Referee: Alejandro Hernández Hernández (Spain)

==== Play-off round ====
The draw for the play-off round was held on 3 August 2026.

18 August 2026 First leg	Fenerbahçe (Turkey)	1–1	(France) Lyon	Istanbul, Turkey
22:00 TRT (UTC+3)	Greenwood 47'; Kanté (yellow card) 81'; Škriniar (yellow card) 84'	Report	Abner (yellow card) 37'; Openda 40'	Stadium: Şükrü Saracoğlu Stadium; Attendance: 41,655; Referee: Sven Jablonski (Germany)

26 August 2026 Second leg	Lyon (France)	1–2 (2–3 agg.)	(Turkey) Fenerbahçe	Décines-Charpieu, France
21:00 CEST (UTC+2)	Openda (yellow card) 51'; Fofana 61'	Report	Muriqi 24'; Brown 28'; Škriniar (yellow card) 32'; Guendouzi (yellow card) 90+4'; Nene (yellow card) 90+5'	Stadium: Parc Olympique Lyonnais; Attendance: 55,443; Referee: Maurizio Mariani (Italy)

==== League phase ====
The league phase draw was held on 27 August 2026.

Pos	Team	Pld	W	D	L	GF	GA	GD	Pts	Qualification
17	(England) Manchester United	4	2	0	2	8	8	0	6	Advance to knockout phase play-offs (unseeded)
18	(Turkey) Galatasaray	4	2	0	2	8	9	−1	6	Advance to knockout phase play-offs (unseeded)
19	(Turkey) Fenerbahçe	4	1	2	1	6	11	−5	5	Advance to knockout phase play-offs (unseeded)
20	(Italy) Roma	4	1	1	2	10	8	+2	4	Advance to knockout phase play-offs (unseeded)
21	(Ukraine) Shakhtar Donetsk	4	1	1	2	4	4	0	4	Advance to knockout phase play-offs (unseeded)

Updated to match(es) played on 4 November 2026. Source: UEFA
Rules for classification: League phase tiebreakers

==== Results summary ====
Overall								Home						Away					
Pld	W	D	L	GF	GA	GD	Pts	W	D	L	GF	GA	GD	W	D	L	GF	GA	GD
4	1	2	1	6	11	−5	5	1	2	0	6	5	+1	0	0	1	0	6	−6

Last updated: 4 November 2026.
Source: UEFA

Pld = Matches played; W = Matches won; D = Matches drawn; L = Matches lost; GF = Goals for; GA = Goals against; GD = Goal difference; Pts = Points

==== Results by round ====
Round	1	2	3	4	5	6	7	8
Ground	H	A	H	H	A	A	H	A
Result	D	L	D	W				
Position	19	28	31	19				

Updated to match(es) played on 4 November 2026. Source: UEFA
A = Away; H = Home; W = Win; D = Draw; L = Loss; P = Postponed

==== Matches ====
10 September 2026 1	Fenerbahçe (Turkey)	1–1	(Italy) Roma	Istanbul, Turkey
19:45 TRT (UTC+3)	Brown 48', (yellow card) 51'; Aktürkoğlu (yellow card) 69'; Müldür (yellow card) 71'; Yüksek (yellow card) 84'	Report	Cristante 39', (yellow card) 86'; Rensch (yellow card) 47'	Stadium: Şükrü Saracoğlu Stadium; Attendance: 40,577; Referee: Jesús Gil Manzano (Spain)

14 October 2026 2	Aston Villa (England)	6–0	(Turkey) Fenerbahçe	Birmingham, England
20:00 BST (UTC+1)	Manzambi 12'; Jackson 31', 39'; Barkley 68' (pen.), 72'; Abraham 90'	Report	Guendouzi (yellow card) 42'; Aydın (yellow card) 78'	Stadium: Villa Park; Attendance: 34,705; Referee: Ivan Kružliak (Slovakia)

20 October 2026 3	Fenerbahçe (Turkey)	2–2	(Czech Republic) Slavia Prague	Istanbul, Turkey
19:45 TRT (UTC+3)	Aydın 4'; Greenwood 11'; Kanté (yellow card) 31'; Škriniar (yellow card) 49'; Yüksek (yellow card) 88'	Report	Provod 15'; Nowak (yellow card) 60'; Kačor 90'	Stadium: Şükrü Saracoğlu Stadium; Attendance: 40,124; Referee: Ricardo de Burgos Bengoetxea (Spain)

4 November 2026 4	Fenerbahçe (Turkey)	3–2	(England) Liverpool	Istanbul, Turkey
20:45 TRT (UTC+3)	Brown (yellow card) 25', (goal) 73'; Greenwood 29'; Muriqi 79'	Report	Nyoni 25'; Isak 69'; Mac Allister (yellow card) 85'	Stadium: Şükrü Saracoğlu Stadium; Referee: Clément Turpin (France)

25 November 2026 5	Shakhtar Donetsk (Ukraine)	v	(Turkey) Fenerbahçe	London, England
20:00 GMT (UTC+0)		Report		Stadium: Stamford Bridge
Note: Due to the Russian invasion of Ukraine, Ukrainian teams were required to play their home matches at neutral venues until further notice.

9 December 2026 6	LASK (Austria)	v	(Turkey) Fenerbahçe	Linz, Austria
21:00 CET (UTC+1)		2026–27 UEFA Champions League league phase#cite note-122		Stadium: Raiffeisen Arena

20 January 2027 7	Fenerbahçe (Turkey)	v	(Spain) Villarreal	Istanbul, Turkey
20:45 TRT (UTC+3)		Report		Stadium: Şükrü Saracoğlu Stadium

27 January 2027 8	Atlético Madrid (Spain)	v	(Turkey) Fenerbahçe	Madrid, Spain
21:00 CET (UTC+1)		Report		Stadium: Metropolitano Stadium

== Statistics ==
Italic written players transferred/loaned out during the season.

=== Appearances and goals ===
No.	Pos	Nat	Player	Total		Süper Lig		Turkish Cup		Turkish Super Cup		Champions League	
No.	Pos	Nat	Player	Apps	Goals	Apps	Goals	Apps	Goals	Apps	Goals	Apps	Goals
Goalkeepers
13	GK	(Turkey) TUR	Tarık Çetin	1	0	1	0	0	0	0	0	0	0
31	GK	(Brazil) BRA	Ederson	16	0	10	0	0	0	0	0	6	0
34	GK	(Turkey) TUR	Mert Günok	4	0	0	0	0	0	0	0	4	0
Defenders
3	DF	(England) ENG	Archie Brown	16	3	8	0	0	0	0	0	8	3
14	DF	(Turkey) TUR	Yiğit Efe Demir	1	0	1	0	0	0	0	0	0	0
15	DF	(Netherlands) NED	Nathan Aké	17	0	8	0	0	0	0	0	9	0
18	DF	(Turkey) TUR	Mert Müldür	9	0	4	0	0	0	0	0	5	0
21	DF	(Ghana) GHA	Kojo Peprah Oppong	7	0	5	0	0	0	0	0	2	0
22	DF	(Turkey) TUR	Levent Mercan	10	0	8	0	0	0	0	0	2	0
24	DF	(Netherlands) NED	Jayden Oosterwolde	3	0	0	0	0	0	0	0	3	0
27	DF	(Portugal) POR	Nélson Semedo	20	0	11	0	0	0	0	0	9	0
37	DF	(Slovakia) SVK	Milan Škriniar	21	1	11	1	0	0	0	0	10	0
67	DF	(Turkey) TUR	Kamil Efe Üregen	0	0	0	0	0	0	0	0	0	0
77	DF	(Serbia) SRB	Ognjen Mimović	0	0	0	0	0	0	0	0	0	0
Midfielders
5	MF	(Turkey) TUR	İsmail Yüksek	15	0	8	0	0	0	0	0	7	0
6	MF	(France) FRA	Mattéo Guendouzi	20	2	11	2	0	0	0	0	9	0
8	MF	(Turkey) TUR	Mert Hakan Yandaş	3	0	3	0	0	0	0	0	0	0
10	MF	(Spain) ESP	Marco Asensio	8	2	3	2	0	0	0	0	5	0
17	MF	(Turkey) TUR	İrfan Can Kahveci	17	5	10	5	0	0	0	0	7	0
28	MF	(Turkey) TUR	Bartuğ Elmaz	6	0	3	0	0	0	0	0	3	0
91	MF	(France) FRA	N'Golo Kanté	18	0	11	0	0	0	0	0	7	0
Forwards
7	FW	(Turkey) TUR	Kerem Aktürkoğlu	19	1	10	1	0	0	0	0	9	0
9	FW	(Belgium) BEL	Romelu Lukaku	14	1	9	1	0	0	0	0	5	0
11	FW	(England) ENG	Mason Greenwood	20	10	10	6	0	0	0	0	10	4
19	FW	(Kosovo) KOS	Vedat Muriqi	18	9	11	7	0	0	0	0	7	2
23	FW	(Turkey) TUR	Cengiz Ünder	0	0	0	0	0	0	0	0	0	0
45	FW	(Mali) MLI	Dorgeles Nene	10	0	6	0	0	0	0	0	4	0
54	FW	(Turkey) TUR	Alaettin Ekici	0	0	0	0	0	0	0	0	0	0
70	FW	(Turkey) TUR	Oğuz Aydın	20	4	11	3	0	0	0	0	9	1
Players transferred/loaned out during the season
7	MF	(Brazil) BRA	Fred	4	0	0	0	0	0	0	0	4	0
20	FW	(Netherlands) NED	Anthony Musaba	1	0	0	0	0	0	0	0	1	0
26	FW	(France) FRA	Sidiki Cherif	1	0	0	0	0	0	0	0	1	0
94	FW	(Brazil) BRA	Talisca	7	5	1	1	0	0	0	0	6	4

Last updated: 8 November 2026

=== Goalscorers ===
Rank	No.	Pos	Nat	Player	Süper Lig	Turkish Cup	Turkish Super Cup	Champions League	Total
1	11	FW	(England)	Mason Greenwood	6	0	0	4	10
2	19	FW	(Kosovo)	Vedat Muriqi	7	0	0	2	9
3	17	MF	(Turkey)	İrfan Can Kahveci	5	0	0	0	5
3	94	FW	(Brazil)	Talisca	1	0	0	4	5
5	70	FW	(Turkey)	Oğuz Aydın	3	0	0	1	4
6	3	DF	(England)	Archie Brown	0	0	0	3	3
7	10	MF	(Spain)	Marco Asensio	2	0	0	0	2
7	6	MF	(France)	Mattéo Guendouzi	2	0	0	0	2
9	37	DF	(Slovakia)	Milan Škriniar	1	0	0	0	1
9	9	FW	(Belgium)	Romelu Lukaku	1	0	0	0	1
9	7	FW	(Turkey)	Kerem Aktürkoğlu	1	0	0	0	1
Totals					29	0	0	14	43

Last updated: 8 November 2026

=== Assists ===
Rank	No.	Pos	Nat	Player	Süper Lig	Turkish Cup	Turkish Super Cup	Champions League	Total
1	7	FW	(Turkey)	Kerem Aktürkoğlu	4	0	0	2	6
2	70	FW	(Turkey)	Oğuz Aydın	5	0	0	0	5
3	11	FW	(England)	Mason Greenwood	2	0	0	2	4
4	17	MF	(Turkey)	İrfan Can Kahveci	3	0	0	0	3
4	22	DF	(Turkey)	Levent Mercan	3	0	0	0	3
4	9	FW	(Belgium)	Romelu Lukaku	3	0	0	0	3
7	3	DF	(England)	Archie Brown	1	0	0	1	2
8	10	MF	(Spain)	Marco Asensio	0	0	0	1	1
8	19	FW	(Kosovo)	Vedat Muriqi	1	0	0	0	1
8	6	MF	(France)	Mattéo Guendouzi	1	0	0	0	1
8	37	DF	(Slovakia)	Milan Škriniar	0	0	0	1	1
8	27	DF	(Portugal)	Nélson Semedo	0	0	0	1	1
Totals					23	0	0	8	31

Last updated: 8 November 2026

=== Clean sheets ===
Rank	No.	Pos	Nat	Player	Süper Lig	Turkish Cup	Turkish Super Cup	Champions League	Total
1	31	GK	(Brazil)	Ederson	6	0	0	0	6
2	34	GK	(Turkey)	Mert Günok	0	0	0	3	3
Totals					6	0	0	3	9

Last updated: 8 November 2026

=== Disciplinary record ===
No.	Pos	Nat	Player	Süper Lig			Turkish Cup			Turkish Super Cup			Champions League			Total		
No.	Pos	Nat	Player	Yellow card	(yellow card) (yellow-red card)	Red card	Yellow card	(yellow card) (yellow-red card)	Red card	Yellow card	(yellow card) (yellow-red card)	Red card	Yellow card	(yellow card) (yellow-red card)	Red card	Yellow card	(yellow card) (yellow-red card)	Red card
3	DF	(England)	Archie Brown	1		1							3			4		1
5	MF	(Turkey)	İsmail Yüksek										2			2		
6	MF	(France)	Mattéo Guendouzi	1									3			4		
7	FW	(Turkey)	Kerem Aktürkoğlu	2									2			4		
7	MF	(Brazil)	Fred										1			1		
9	FW	(Belgium)	Romelu Lukaku	2												2		
11	FW	(England)	Mason Greenwood	1									1			2		
17	MF	(Turkey)	İrfan Can Kahveci	2												2		
18	DF	(Turkey)	Mert Müldür										1			1		
19	FW	(Kosovo)	Vedat Muriqi	1												1		
31	GK	(Brazil)	Ederson	1												1		
24	DF	(Netherlands)	Jayden Oosterwolde										1			1		
27	DF	(Portugal)	Nélson Semedo	3									2			5		
37	DF	(Slovakia)	Milan Škriniar	2									3			5		
45	FW	(Mali)	Dorgeles Nene										1			1		
70	FW	(Turkey)	Oğuz Aydın	2									1			3		
91	DF	(France)	N'Golo Kanté	2									2			4		

Last updated: 8 November 2026
