= Deniz Gül =

Turkish footballer

Personal information
- Full name: Deniz Daniel Gül
- Date of birth: 2 July 2004 (age 22)
- Place of birth: Stockholm, Sweden
- Height: 1.92 m (6 ft 4 in)
- Position: Forward

Team information
- Current team: Galatasaray

Youth career
- 2017–2019: AIK
- 2019–2021: FC Djursholm
- 2021–2022: Hammarby IF

Senior career*
Years	Team	Apps	(Gls)
2023	Hammarby TFF	23	(14)
2023–2024	Hammarby IF	21	(3)
2024–2026	Porto	46	(6)
2026–	Galatasaray	7	(1)

International career^{‡}
2023	Sweden U19	6	(1)
2024	Sweden U21	6	(2)
2025–	Turkey	16	(2)
- * Club domestic league appearances and goals as of 23:19, 19 September 2026 (UTC) ‡ National team caps and goals as of 21:17, 16 November 2026 (UTC)

Deniz Gül (born 2 July 2004) is a professional footballer who plays as a forward for Süper Lig club Galatasaray. Born in Sweden, he plays for the Turkey national team.

== Early life ==
Born and raised in Stockholm, to a Turkish father and Swedish mother, Gül started to play football with local club Stuvsta IF. He later went on to represent Segeltorps IF, IF Brommapojkarna, AIK and FC Djursholm at youth level.

In 2021, Gül joined the youth academy of Hammarby IF. In August 2022, Gül reportedly turned down a move to Italian club Cagliari. He won the 2022 P19 Allsvenskan with Hammarby, becoming the league's top scorer and being voted Forward of the Year.

== Club career ==
=== Hammarby ===
On 17 September 2022, Gül was called up to Hammarby's senior squad in Allsvenskan for the first time, but remained on the bench the whole game in a 1–1 away draw against BK Häcken. In January 2023, he signed a three-year contract with Hammarby. Throughout the 2023 season, Gül mostly played for feeder team Hammarby TFF in Ettan, Sweden's third tier, scoring 14 goals in 22 appearances. On 22 October 2023, he made his league debut for Hammarby in Allsvenskan, coming on as a substitute in a 0–0 draw against Djurgårdens IF.

=== Porto ===
On 24 August 2024, Gül signed for Portuguese club FC Porto with a contract until 2029. A month later, on 25 September, he made his continental debut in his career against Bodø/Glimt in a UEFA Europa League away game and also scored his first continental goal, they lost 3–2. On 29 September, he made Primeira Liga debut as a substitute and scored his first league goal with the team against Arouca in a 4–0 home win. On 31 October, he made his Allianz Cup debut as a starter against Moreirense, they won 2–0. Later that year, on 8 December, he played with Porto B in Liga Portugal 2 against Chaves.

On 19 June 2025, he played as a substitute against Inter Miami in a 2025 FIFA Club World Cup game. He won his first title with the club by winning the 2025–26 Primeira Liga.

=== Galatasaray ===
On 1 September 2026, Turkish Süper Lig giants Galatasaray announced the initiation of official negotiations with Gül and his club, Porto, regarding his imminent transfer. Gül arrived in Istanbul on the same day. Also that day, a 5-year contract was signed with Galatasaray; a transfer fee of €10,000,000.00 will be paid for this transfer.

== International career ==
In 2023, Gül was called up to the Swedish U19s, making appearances in the 2023 UEFA European Under-19 Championship qualification.

On 6 November 2024, Gül announced he would instead represent Turkey internationally despite having made a dozen appearances for Sweden.

On 14 March 2025, Gül was called up by Vincenzo Montella to the Turkey national team for the 2024–25 UEFA Nations League promotion/relegation play-offs against Hungary.

On 18 November 2025, he scored his first national goal against Spain in the 2026 FIFA World Cup qualification.

On 2 June 2026, Gül was selected in the 26-man squad for the 2026 FIFA World Cup.

== Career statistics ==
=== Club ===
As of match played 13 November 2026.

Appearances and goals by club, season and competition
Club	Season	League			National cup (Note: Includes Swedish Cup, Taça de Portugal)		League cup (Note: Includes Taça da Liga)		Continental		Other		Total	
Club	Season	Division	Apps	Goals	Apps	Goals	Apps	Goals	Apps	Goals	Apps	Goals	Apps	Goals
Hammarby TFF	2023	Ettan	23	14	0	0	—		—		—		23	14
Hammarby IF	2023	Allsvenskan	3	0	1	0	—		0	0	—		4	0
Hammarby IF	2024	Allsvenskan	18	3	3	0	—		0	0	—		21	3
Hammarby IF	Total		21	3	4	0	—		0	0	—		25	3
Porto	2024–25	Primeira Liga	14	1	0	0	2	0	6 (Note: Appearances in UEFA Europa League)	1	1 (Note: Appearance in FIFA Club World Cup)	0	23	2
Porto	2025–26	Primeira Liga	29	5	5	1	0	0	10	1	—		44	7
Porto	2026–27	Primeira Liga	3	0	—		—		—		1 (Note: Appearance in Supertaça Cândido de Oliveira)	0	4	0
Porto	Total		46	6	5	1	2	0	16	2	2	0	71	9
Galatasaray	2026–27	Süper Lig	7	1	0	0	—		2 (Note: Appearance in UEFA Champions League)	0	0	0	9	1
Career total			97	24	9	1	2	0	18	2	2	0	127	27

=== International ===
As of match played 16 November 2026.

Appearances and goals by national team and year
National team	Year	Apps	Goals
Turkey	2025	5	1
Turkey	2026	11	1
Total		16	2

Scores and results list Turkey's goal tally first.

List of international goals scored by Deniz Gül
No.	Date	Venue	Cap	Opponent	Score	Result	Competition	Ref.
1	18 November 2025	La Cartuja, Seville, Spain	5	Spain	1–1	2–2	2026 FIFA World Cup qualification	
2	1 June 2026	Şükrü Saracoğlu Stadium, Istanbul, Turkey	7	North Macedonia	3–0	4–0	Friendly	

== Honours ==
Porto

- Primeira Liga: 2025–26
- Supertaça Cândido de Oliveira: 2026
