= Kojo Peprah Oppong =

Ghanaian footballer (born 2004)

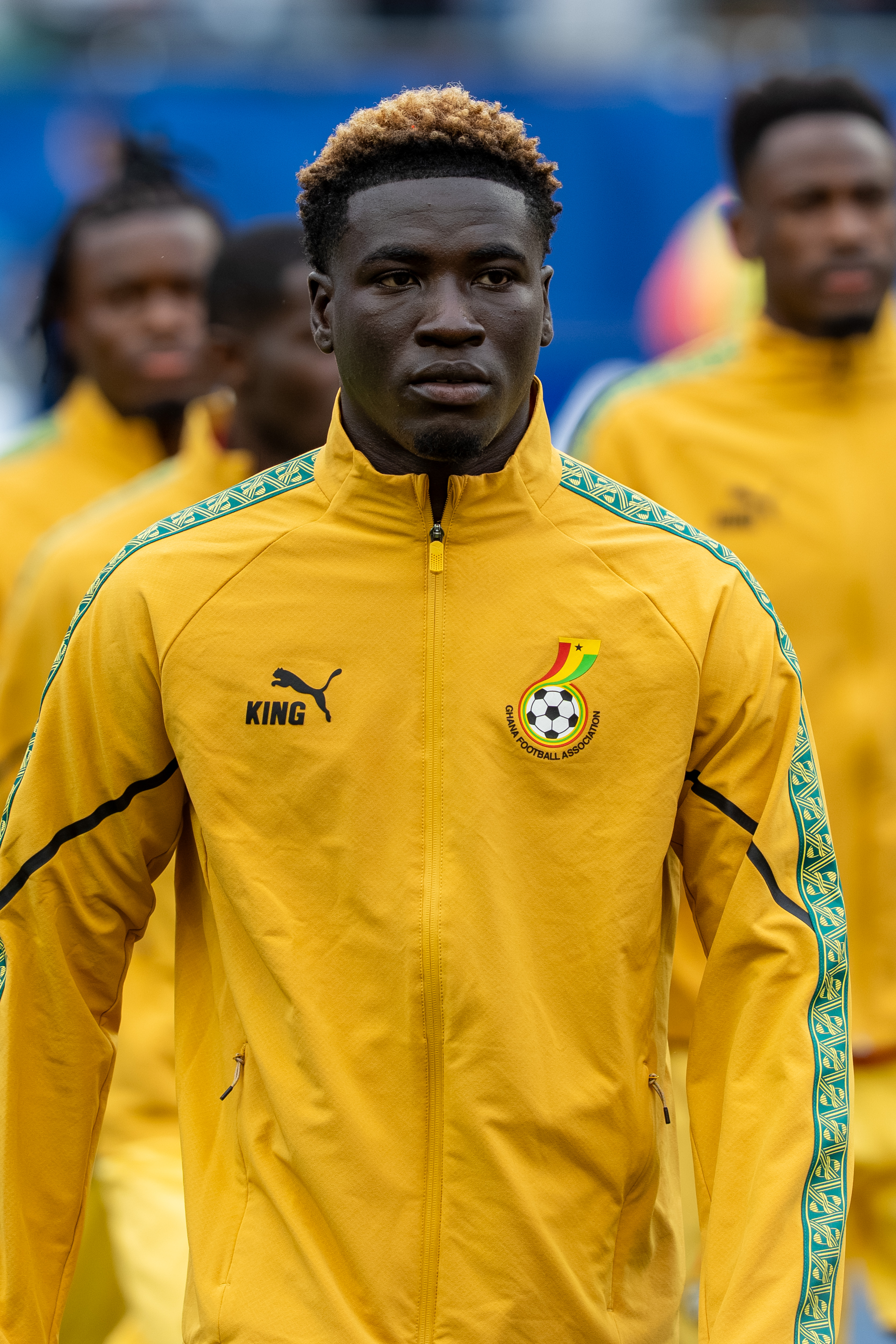
- Peprah Oppong with Ghana in 2026

Personal information
- Date of birth: 4 June 2004 (age 22)
- Place of birth: Accra, Ghana
- Height: 1.88 m (6 ft 2 in)
- Position: Centre-back

Team information
- Current team: Fenerbahçe
- Number: 21

Senior career*
Years	Team	Apps	(Gls)
–2022	Attram De Visser		
2023–2025	IFK Norrköping	16	(0)
2023–2024	→ GIF Sundsvall (loan)	38	(0)
2025–2026	Nice	29	(1)
2026–	Fenerbahçe	5	(0)

International career^{‡}
2025–	Ghana	8	(0)
- * Club domestic league appearances and goals as of 8 November 2026 ‡ National team caps and goals as of 29 September 2026

Kojo Peprah Oppong (born 4 June 2004) is a Ghanaian professional footballer who plays as a centre-back for Süper Lig club Fenerbahçe and the Ghana national team.

== Early life ==
Peprah Oppong was born on 4 June 2004 in Accra, Ghana. The son of Cecilia and Joseph, he has a sister. He also holds French nationality from his mother.

== Club career ==
=== Attram De Visser ===
Peprah Oppong started his career with Ghanaian side Attram De Visser.

=== Norrköping ===
Following his stint for Attram De Visser, he signed for Swedish side IFK Norrköping in 2023. He made his Allsvenskan debut with the team as a late substitute against Malmö on 24 April 2023.

After his successful season with Sundsvall in 2023-2024 season, he returned to Norrköping for 2025 Allsvenskan season and played twenty-three matches in all competition.

==== Loan to Sundsvall ====
In 2023, he was sent on loan to Superettan side Sundsvall. On 19 August 2023, he made his debut as a starter in 2-0 lost against Skövde.

He made forty-two league appearances in all competition.

=== Nice ===
Ahead of the 2025–26 season, he signed for French Ligue 1 side Nice for around €2.5 million on a four-year contract.

On 16 August 2025, he made his Ligue 1 debut as a starter against Toulouse. On 2 October 2025, he made his continental debut as starter in 2025–26 UEFA Europa League league phase second week match, 2-1 lost against Fenerbahçe.

=== Fenerbahçe ===
On 28 August 2026, Peprah Oppong joined Süper Lig club Fenerbahçe for €12 million and signed a four-year contract.

On 20 September 2026, he made his debut as a substitute against Eyüpspor in a 8-0 Süper Lig victory. On 20 October 2026, he made his continental debut with the team as a substitute against Slavia Prague in a 2-2 2026–27 UEFA Champions League league phase game.

== International career ==
In October 2025, Peprah Oppong earned his maiden invitation to the Ghana senior national team. He made his international debut in a 2026 FIFA World Cup qualifier against Comoros at the Accra Sports Stadium on 12 October 2025.

On 2 June 2026, Peprah Oppong was named in head coach Carlos Queiroz's 26-man squad for the 2026 FIFA World Cup.

== Style of play ==
Peprah Oppong plays as a defender and is right-footed. French news website wrote in 2025 that he is "a solid defender, strong on the man and very lively... a versatile central defender... can play on either the right or left flank".

== Career statistics ==
=== Club ===
As of match played 8 November 2026

Appearances and goals by club, season and competition
Club	Season	League			National cup (Note: Includes Svenska Cupen, Coupe de France and Turkish Cup)		Europe		Other		Total	
Club	Season	Division	Apps	Goals	Apps	Goals	Apps	Goals	Apps	Goals	Apps	Goals
IFK Norrköping	2023	Allsvenskan	1	0	2	0	—		—		3	0
IFK Norrköping	2025	Allsvenskan	15	0	5	0	—		—		20	0
IFK Norrköping	Total		16	0	7	0	—		—		23	0
GIF Sundsvall (loan)	2023	Superettan	11	0	1	0	—		—		12	0
GIF Sundsvall (loan)	2024	Superettan	27	0	3	0	—		—		30	0
GIF Sundsvall (loan)	Total		38	0	4	0	—		—		42	0
Nice	2025–26	Ligue 1	29	1	5	0	7 (Note: Two appearances in UEFA Champions League, five appearances in UEFA Europa League)	0	2 (Note: Appearances in Ligue 1 relegation/promotion play-offs)	0	43	1
Fenerbahçe	2026–27	Süper Lig	5	0	0	0	2 (Note: Appearances in UEFA Champions League)	0	0	0	7	0
Career total			88	1	16	0	9	0	2	0	115	1

=== International ===
As of match played 29 September 2026

Appearances and goals by national team and year
National team	Year	Apps	Goals
Ghana	2025	3	0
Ghana	2026	5	0
Total		8	0

== Honours ==
Nice

- Coupe de France runner-up: 2025–26
