= Orhan Atik =

Turkish football coach and former player

Personal information
- Date of birth: 25 February 1967 (age 59)
- Place of birth: Pütürge, Malatya, Turkey
- Position: Defender

Team information
- Current team: Galatasaray (assistant coach)

Youth career
- 1984–1990: Galatasaray

Senior career*
| Years | Team | Apps | (Gls) |
| 1990–1993 | Bakırköyspor | 61 | (1) |
| 1993–1999 | Antalyaspor | 130 | (2) |
| 1999–2001 | Yimpaş Yozgatspor | 2 | (0) |
| 2001 | Göztepe | 3 | (0) |

Managerial career
- 2003: Elazığspor (assistant)
- 2003–2005: İstanbulspor (assistant)
- 2005–2006: Mardinspor (assistant)
- 2007–2008: Beylerbeyi
- 2008: Antalyaspor (assistant)
- 2008: Antalyaspor
- 2010–2016: Galatasaray A2
- 2016: Galatasaray (caretaker)
- 2016: Galatasaray (assistant coach)
- 2026–: Galatasaray (assistant coach)
- * Club domestic league appearances and goals

Orhan Atik (born 25 February 1967) is a Turkish football coach and former player.
