= 2024 GIF Sundsvall season =

GIF Sundsvall
2024 season
- Manager: Ion Doros (from 2 June to 11 July)
- Stadium: NP3 Arena
- Superettan: 13th
- 2023–24 Svenska Cupen: Group stage
- 2024–25 Svenska Cupen: Round 2
- Top goalscorer: League: Yaqub Finey (4); All: Yaqub Finey (4)

During the 2024 season, GIF Sundsvall will compete in the domestic Superettan and the 2023–24 Svenska Cupen, in addition to the new edition of the National Cup. The current coach for the season is Ion Doros, who was appointed on June 2 after a poor start to the campaign.

== Transfers ==
=== In ===
Pos.	Player	Transferred from	Fee	Date	Source
DF	(Ghana) Kojo Peprah Oppong	(Sweden) IFK Norrköping	Loan	1 February 2024	
DF	(Sweden) Pontus Lindgren	(Iceland) KR	Free	12 February 2024	
GK	(Sweden) Sebastian Ekholm	(Sweden) Ljungskile SK	Free	16 February 2024	
MF	(Spain) Marc Manchón	(Spain) Cerdanyola del Vallès	Free	24 February 2024	
GK	(Sweden) Daniel Henareh	(Sweden) AIK	Undisclosed	28 February 2024	
MF	(Sweden) Hugo Aviander	(Sweden) AIK	Undisclosed	27 March 2024	

=== Out ===
Pos.	Player	Transferred to	Fee	Date	Source
GK	(Sweden) Sebastian Ekholm		Contract terminated	20 February 2024	
MF	(Sweden) Yonis Shino	(Sweden) IFK Östersund	Loan	23 March 2024	

== Friendlies ==
23 January 2024 Friendly	GIF Sundsvall	2–0	Hudiksvall

2 February 2024 Friendly	GIF Sundsvall	6–1	Umeå

10 February 2024 Friendly	GIF Sundsvall	1–1	Umeå

10 March 2024 Friendly	GIF Sundsvall	1–1	Sandviken

15 March 2024 Friendly	GIF Sundsvall	2–0	Friska Viljor

23 March 2024 Friendly	Brommapojkarna	1–0	GIF Sundsvall

== Competitions ==
=== Overall record ===
Competition	First match	Last match	Starting round	Final position	Record							
Competition	First match	Last match	Starting round	Final position	Pld	W	D	L	GF	GA	GD	Win %
Superettan	30 March 2024	9 November 2024	Matchday 1	13th	30	9	7	14	29	40	−11	30.00
2023–24 Svenska Cupen	17 February 2024	4 March 2024	Group stage	Group stage	3	0	1	2	4	7	−3	0.00
2024–25 Svenska Cupen	20 August 2024		Round 2	Round 2	1	0	0	1	0	1	−1	0.00
Total					34	9	8	17	33	48	−15	26.47

Source: Soccerway

=== Superettan ===
==== League table ====
Pos	Team	Pld	W	D	L	GF	GA	GD	Pts	Promotion, qualification or relegation
11	Örebro SK	30	10	9	11	37	36	+1	39	
12	IK Oddevold	30	8	12	10	34	47	−13	36	
13	GIF Sundsvall (O)	30	9	7	14	29	40	−11	34	Qualification for Superettan play-off
14	Östersunds FK (O)	30	8	8	14	30	44	−14	32	Qualification for Superettan play-off
15	Gefle IF (R)	30	8	8	14	37	54	−17	32	Relegation to Ettan

Updated to match(es) played on 9 November 2024. Source: svenskfotboll.se
Rules for classification: 1) Points; 2) Goal difference; 3) Number of goals scored; 4) Head-to-head points; 5) Head-to-head goal difference; 6) Head-to-head away goals scored
(O) Play-off winners; (R) Relegated

==== Results summary ====
Overall								Home						Away					
Pld	W	D	L	GF	GA	GD	Pts	W	D	L	GF	GA	GD	W	D	L	GF	GA	GD
16	3	3	10	13	28	−15	12	3	2	3	10	12	−2	0	1	7	3	16	−13

Last updated: 28 July 2024.

==== Results by round ====
Round	1	2	3	4	5	6	7	8	9	10	11	12	13	14
Ground	H	A	H	A	H	A	H	A	H	A	H	A	A	H
Result	W	L	W	L	D	L	L	L	D	L	L	D	L	
Position														

Updated to match(es) played on 28 July 2024. Source:
A = Away; H = Home; W = Win; D = Draw; L = Loss

==== Matches ====
30 March 2024 1	GIF Sundsvall	1–0	Östersunds FK	Sundsvall
				Stadium: NP3 Arena

6 April 2024 2	Degerfors IF	2–0	GIF Sundsvall

12 April 2024 3	GIF Sundsvall	3–1	Skövde AIK	Sundsvall
				Stadium: NP3 Arena

20 April 2024 4	Utsiktens BK	1–0	GIF Sundsvall

27 April 2024 5	GIF Sundsvall	1–1	Varbergs BoIS	Sundsvall
				Stadium: NP3 Arena

4 May 2024 6	Oddevold	1–0	GIF Sundsvall

11 May 2024 7	GIF Sundsvall	1–3	Landskrona	Sundsvall
				Stadium: NP3 Arena

17 May 2024 8	Gefle	1–0	GIF Sundsvall

22 May 2024 9	GIF Sundsvall	0–0	Sandviken	Sundsvall
				Stadium: NP3 Arena

27 May 2024 10	Trelleborg	3–2	GIF Sundsvall

2 June 2024 11	GIF Sundsvall	1–3	Helsingborg	Sundsvall
				Stadium: NP3 Arena

14 June 2024 12	Örgryte	1–1	GIF Sundsvall

23 June 2024 13	Brage	5–0	GIF Sundsvall	Borlänge
15:00				Stadium: Domnarvsvallen

29 June 2024 14	GIF Sundsvall	1–3	Örebro	Sundsvall
15:00				Stadium: NP3 Arena

20 July 2024 15	Östers IF	2–0	GIF Sundsvall	Växjö
15:00				Stadium: Visma Arena

28 July 2024 16	GIF Sundsvall	2–1	Trelleborgs FF	Sundsvall
13:00				Stadium: NP3 Arena

2 August 2024 17	GIF Sundsvall	v	Utsiktens BK	Sundsvall
13:00				Stadium: NP3 Arena

=== 2023–24 Svenska Cupen ===
==== Group stage ====
Pos	Team	Pld	W	D	L	GF	GA	GD	Pts	Qualification	MAIF	HAM	VSK	GIF
1	Mjällby AIF	3	2	1	0	6	3	+3	7	Advance to Knockout stage			2–0	3–2
2	Hammarby IF	3	1	1	1	5	4	+1	4		1–1		1–2	3–1
3	Västerås SK	3	1	1	1	3	4	−1	4					1–1
4	GIF Sundsvall	3	0	1	2	4	7	−3	1					

Source: SvFF
Rules for classification: 1) Points; 2) Goal difference; 3) Goals scored; 4) Head-to-head record; 5) Lowest disciplinary points; 6) Highest ranked team
