= Berat Luş =

Turkish footballer

Personal information
- Date of birth: 20 April 2007 (age 19)
- Place of birth: Fatih, Istanbul, Turkey
- Position: Winger

Team information
- Current team: Galatasaray
- Number: 73

Youth career
- 2016–2020: Güngören Atletik Spor
- 2018–2019: → Galatasaray (loan)
- 2020–2024: Galatasaray

Senior career*
Years	Team	Apps	(Gls)
2024–	Galatasaray	1	(0)
2025–2026	→ Esenler Erokspor (loan)	34	(5)

International career^{‡}
2023	Turkey U17	1	(0)
2024–2025	Turkey U18	8	(3)
2025–2026	Turkey U19	8	(3)
2026–	Turkey U20	3	(0)
- * Club domestic league appearances and goals as of 17 October 2026 ‡ National team caps and goals as of 26 August 2026

Berat Luş (Albanian: Berat Lushi; born 20 April 2007) is a Turkish professional footballer who plays as a winger for the Süper Lig club Galatasaray.

== Early life and youth career ==
Berat Luş was born in Fatih, Istanbul, Turkey. He began playing football with the youth academy of Güngören Atletik Spor in 2016 and joined Galatasaray's youth academy in 2018, where he developed until signing his first professional contract.

== Club career ==
=== Galatasaray ===
On 8 October 2024, he signed his first professional contract with Galatasaray, a deal running until 30 June 2027. He made his senior and professional debut with Galatasaray in the Süper Lig as a substitute in a 5–1 win over Kayserispor on 22 December 2024.

=== Esenler Erokspor (loan) ===
On 27 July 2025, he signed a 1-year loan contract with Esenler Erokspor. On 30 August 2025, Luş scored his first goal for Esenler Erokspor in a 2–0 league win against Ümraniyespor. On 25 September 2025, at the age of 18, Luş scored four goals in a 5–0 league win over İstanbulspor, marking a notable performance early in his senior career.

== International career ==
Luş is a youth international for Turkey, having played for the Turkey U17 and U18s, scoring 3 goals for the latter.

== Personal life ==
Berat Luş comes from an Albanian family, originating from Gostivar, who moved to Turkey in the 1980s.

== Honours ==
Galatasaray

- Turkish Cup: 2024–25
- Süper Lig: 2024–25
