= Galatasaray S.K. Football Academy =

Galatasaray Futbol Akademisi
- Full name: Galatasaray Futbol Akademisi
- Ground: Florya Metin Oktay Facilities
- Capacity: 2,500
- Chairman: (Turkey) Dursun Özbek
- Manager: (Turkey) Ali Yavaş
- Website: www.galatasaray.org/sl/futbol-akademisi-ana-sayfa/26
Home colours	Away colours	Third colours

The Galatasaray S.K. Football Academy (Turkish: Galatasaray Spor Klubü Futbol Akademisi) is a football youth academy based in Florya Metin Oktay Facilities, Istanbul, Turkey, from where the organization manages a total of 11 youth teams (ages between 8–19). The academy is the primary youth clinic of Turkish footballing giants Galatasaray.

== History ==
Galatasaray Futbol Akademisi is famous for having produced and still producing many great Turkish internationals like Arda Turan, Emre Belözoğlu, Bülent Korkmaz, Tugay Kerimoğlu, Okan Buruk and Ozan Kabak.

== Squads ==
=== U19 Squad ===
As of 14 August 2026

Note: Flags indicate national team as defined under FIFA eligibility rules; some limited exceptions apply. Players may hold more than one non-FIFA nationality.

No.	Pos.	Nation	Player
—	GK	TUR	Arda Koşutan
—	GK	TUR	Arda Yılmaz
—	GK	TUR	Atakan Arıcı
—	GK	TUR	Cem Efe Eroğlu
—	DF	TUR	Abdullah Satılmış
—	DF	TUR	Abdulsamet Şimşek
—	DF	TUR	Ali Emir Esen
—	DF	TUR	Cihan Akgün
—	DF	TUR	Eren Kaya
—	DF	TUR	Ferhat Bulut
—	DF	TUR	Hasan Turan
—	DF	TUR	Kaan Bayri
—	DF	TUR	Mert Ali Güven
—	DF	TUR	Yusuf Dağhan Kahraman
—	DF	TUR	Yusuf Sivaslıoğlu (U17 player)
—	MF	TUR	Abdullah Kolazlı
—	MF	USA	Ada Metin Karatepe (overage player)

No.	Pos.	Nation	Player
—	MF	TUR	Berat Luş (overage player)
—	MF	KAZ	Can Hocaoğlu
—	MF	TUR	Eyüp Can Karasu (overage player)
—	MF	TUR	Furkan Koçak
—	MF	TUR	Kartal Yiğithan Yılmaz (U17 player)
—	MF	TUR	Kuzey Yıldız (U17 player)
—	MF	TUR	Mehmet Can Albayrak
—	MF	TUR	Mustafa Duru
—	MF	TUR	Mustafa Kaan Eryürek
—	MF	TUR	Necati Oğulcan Yançel
—	MF	TUR	Onur Kağan Yıldız
—	MF	TUR	Zoğrap Ege İzgi
—	FW	TUR	Ada Yüzgeç
—	FW	TUR	Arda Tagay
—	FW	ARG	Can Armando Güner
—	FW	TUR	Efe Gündal (overage player)
—	FW	TUR	Nurullah Talha Yel (U17 player)

=== Unregistered players ===
Note: Flags indicate national team as defined under FIFA eligibility rules; some limited exceptions apply. Players may hold more than one non-FIFA nationality.

No.	Pos.	Nation	Player
—	GK	TUR	Hamza Özalp

=== Underage players featuring with U19s ===
Note: Flags indicate national team as defined under FIFA eligibility rules; some limited exceptions apply. Players may hold more than one non-FIFA nationality.

No.	Pos.	Nation	Player
—	DF	TUR	Atlas Birimen (U17 player)
—	DF	TUR	Murat İsmail Dönmez (U17 player)
—	DF	TUR	Rasih Ege Candan (U17 player)
—	MF	TUR	Kerem Arslan (U17 player)

No.	Pos.	Nation	Player
—	MF	TUR	Muhammet Burak Görgin (U17 player)
—	MF	TUR	Musab Ümeyir Apdal (U17 player)
—	FW	TUR	Arda Akar (U17 player)
—	FW	TUR	Ömer Faruk Gülpınar (U17 player)
—	FW	TUR	Uras Ilgın (U17 player)

== Football Academy Administrative and Technical Staff ==
As of 7 September 2026

Name	Nat.	Job
Murat Dizdar	(Turkey)	Academy Development Director
Emir Kıvırcık	(Turkey)	Academy Club Relations Officer
Semih Egemen Ersoy	(Turkey)	Football Academy Administrative Manager
Birkan Bozkurt	(Turkey)	Development Leagues Coordinator
Sedat Debreli	(Turkey)	Development Leagues Coordinator
Alparslan Erdem	(Turkey)	U19 Head Coach
Nazmi Arslan	(Turkey)	U19 Assistant Coach
Adem Adem	(Turkey)	U19 Assistant Coach
Eren Derdiyok	(Switzerland)	U17 Head Coach
Alpcan Sülün	(Turkey)	U17 Assistant Coach
Faruk Koç	(Turkey)	U16 Head Coach
Hakan Gaş	(Turkey)	U16 Assistant Coach
Cihan Can	(Turkey)	U15 Head Coach
Uğurcan Bülbül	(Turkey)	U15 Assistant Coach
Yiğit Demiral	(Turkey)	U14 Head Coach
Selim Deniz Peker	(Turkey)	U14 Assistant Coach
Emrah Taşar	(Turkey)	U13 Head Coach
Emin Sunar	(Turkey)	U13 Assistant Coach
Ahmet Öksüz	(Turkey)	U12 Head Coach
Yesugay Çetrez	(Turkey)	U11 Head Coach
Mithat Yavaş	(Turkey)	U10 Head Coach
İrfan Mesut Köleoğlu	(Turkey)	U8, and U9 Head Coach
Erdinç Mergen	(Turkey)	U8, U9, and U10 Assistant Coach
Emirhan Ergün	(Turkey)	Goalkeeping Coach
Anıl Özer	(Turkey)	Goalkeeping Coach
Burak Kavas	(Turkey)	Goalkeeping Coach
Emre Uyar	(Turkey)	Goalkeeping Coach
Ramazan Evren Üstündağ	(Turkey)	Goalkeeping Coach
Ahmet Yıldız	(Turkey)	Administrative Affairs Officer
Anıl Adalı	(Turkey)	Administrative Affairs Officer
Muammer Sertaç Özel	(Turkey)	Athletic Performance Coach
Erdem Kıray	(Turkey)	Athletic Performance Coach
Furkan Durmuş	(Turkey)	Athletic Performance Coach
Doğuş Can İncedere	(Turkey)	Athletic Performance Coach
Behçet Canberk Yelce	(Turkey)	Athletic Performance Coach
Hümeyra Balcıoğlu	(Turkey)	Fitness Coach
Mertcan Arda Tekin	(Turkey)	Analysis Coach
Osman Arslan	(Turkey)	Analysis Coach
Selçuk Çakmak	(Turkey)	Analysis Coach
Ömer Faruk Cengiz	(Turkey)	Analysis Coach
Mustafa Seyhan	(Turkey)	Head Scout
Tayfun Hut	(Turkey)	Scout
Ahmet Genç	(Turkey)	Scout
Ozan Özyurt	(Turkey)	Scout
Onur Çubukçu	(Turkey)	Scout
Cihan Deniz Arslan	(Turkey)	Doctor
Burak Subaşı	(Turkey)	Physiotherapist
Mert Meral	(Turkey)	Physiotherapist
Berk Gezer	(Turkey)	Physiotherapist
Aleyna Bilirdönmez	(Turkey)	Psychological Performance Consultant
Şefika Çim	(Turkey)	Nutritionist
Abdulrahim Karahan	(Turkey)	Masseur
Fatih İnal	(Turkey)	Masseur
Kenan Yalçın	(Turkey)	Masseur
Emre Gökçe	(Turkey)	Masseur
Mutluay Özerman	(Turkey)	School–Family Relations and Social Activities Officer
Hüseyin Genç	(Turkey)	Kit Manager
Vahdettin Çelik	(Turkey)	Kit Manager
Ramazan Demirel	(Turkey)	Kit Manager

== Notable players ==
- Turgay Şeren
- Uğur Köken
- Coşkun Özarı
- Cüneyt Tanman
- Bülent Korkmaz
- Tugay Kerimoğlu
- Okan Buruk
- Suat Kaya
- Arda Turan
- Emre Belözoğlu
- Sabri Sarıoğlu
- Aydın Yılmaz
- Ozan Kabak
- Emre Çolak
- Semih Kaya
