= Chris Kavanagh =

Chris Kavanagh may refer to:

- Chris Kavanagh (musician) (born 1964), English drummer
- Chris Kavanagh (referee) (born 1985), English football referee
