= Armando Güner =

Footballer (born 2009)

Personal information
- Full name: Can Armando Güner
- Date of birth: 7 January 2008 (age 18)
- Place of birth: Krefeld, Germany
- Height: 1.78 m (5 ft 10 in)
- Position: Winger

Team information
- Current team: Galatasaray
- Number: 29

Youth career
- –2019: Schalke 04
- 2019–2025: Borussia Mönchengladbach

Senior career*
| Years | Team | Apps | (Gls) |
| 2025–2026 | Borussia Mönchengladbach II | 1 | (0) |
| 2026– | Galatasaray | 1 | (0) |

International career
| 2023–2024 | Germany U16 | 7 | (4) |
| 2024–2025 | Germany U17 | 7 | (1) |
| 2025– | Argentina U17 | 3 | (0) |
- * Club domestic league appearances and goals

Can Armando Güner (born 7 January 2008) is a professional footballer who plays as a winger for Galatasaray. Born in Germany, he has represented Germany and Argentina internationally at youth level.

== Early life ==
Güner was born on 7 January 2008 in Krefeld, Germany. He is the son of a Turkish father and an Argentine mother.

== Club career ==
=== Youth ===
As a youth player, Güner joined the youth academy of German side Schalke 04. Following his stint there, he joined the youth academy of German Bundesliga side Borussia Mönchengladbach in 2019, helping the club's under-17 team win the league title.

=== Galatasaray ===
On 5 February 2026, Güner signed a contract with Turkish Süper Lig side Galatasaray for a reported fee of €350,000.

== International career ==
Güner is a Germany and Argentina youth international. During May 2025, he played for the Germany national under-17 football team at the 2025 UEFA European Under-17 Championship. He has been part of the Argentina national under-17 football team squad at 2025 FIFA U-17 World Cup in Qatar.

In early days of January 2026, Güner obtained blue card to be eligible to play under the Turkish quota. Following these procedures, he will also be able to play for the Turkish national teams.

== Honours ==
Galatasaray

- Süper Lig: 2025–26
