= 2026 Turkish Super Cup =

Turkish Super Cup

TFF Süper Kupa

Tournament details
- Host country: Turkey
- Dates: 4–5 January 2027 (semi-finals); 9 January 2027 (final)
- Teams: 4
- Venue: TBA (in TBA host cities)

Tournament statistics
- Matches played: 3

The 2026 Turkish Super Cup, or the 2026 Turkcell Super Cup (Turkish: 2026 Turkcell Süper Kupa) for sponsorship reasons, will be the 53rd edition of the Turkish Super Cup since its establishment as Presidential Cup in 1966, the annual Turkish football match contested by the winners of the previous season's top league and cup competitions (or cup runner-up in case the league- and cup-winning club was the same).

This will be the second and also last edition with four teams, which would include a semi-final round. The matches are going to be played as single-elimination games at neutral venue(s) which are yet to be announced by TFF.

== Qualification ==
The tournament will feature the winners and runners-up of the 2025–26 Süper Lig, as well as the winners and runners-up of the 2025–26 Turkish Cup.

=== Qualified teams ===
The following four teams qualified for the tournament.

Team	Method of qualification	Appearance	Last appearance as	Previous performance	
Team	Method of qualification	Appearance	Last appearance as	Winner(s)	Runners-up
Galatasaray	2025–26 Süper Lig winners	29th	2025 runners-up	17	11
Fenerbahçe	2025–26 Süper Lig runners-up	21st	2025 winners	10	10
Trabzonspor	2025–26 Turkish Cup winners	14th	2025 semi-finalist	10	3
Konyaspor	2025–26 Turkish Cup runners-up	1	2017 winners	1	–

== Venue ==
The venues have yet to be announced by TFF.

== Matches ==
=== Bracket ===
Semi-finals
SF1 - 4 January 2027 – TBA
Galatasaray
Konyaspor
SF2 - 5 January 2027 – TBA
Fenerbahçe
Trabzonspor

Final
9 January 2027 – TBA

=== Semi-finals ===
4 January 2026

Galatasaray	v	Konyaspor

5 January 2026

Fenerbahçe	v	Trabzonspor

=== Final ===
9 January 2026

v

== See also ==
- 2025–26 Süper Lig
- 2025–26 Turkish Cup
