= Ada Yüzgeç =

Turkish footballer

Personal information
- Date of birth: April 3, 2009 (age 17)
- Place of birth: İskenderun, Turkey
- Height: 1.80 m (5 ft 11 in)
- Position: Striker

Team information
- Current team: Galatasaray
- Number: 62

Youth career
- 2019–2026: Galatasaray

Senior career*
Years	Team	Apps	(Gls)
2026–	Galatasaray	1	(0)

International career^{‡}
2023–2024	Turkey U15	9	(8)
2024–2025	Turkey U16	15	(10)
2025	Turkey U17	6	(4)
2026–	Turkey U18	1	(0)
- * Club domestic league appearances and goals as of 21:52, 15 August 2026 (UTC) ‡ National team caps and goals as of 21:52, 15 August 2026 (UTC)

Ada Yüzgeç (born 3 April 2009) is a Turkish footballer who plays as a striker for Süper Lig club Galatasaray.

== Club career ==
Yüzgeç is ap product of the academy of Galatasaray, and started training with their senior team as a 16 year old. He was named to Galatasaray's match day squad on the bench for the 2025 Turkish Super Cup final. On 13 January 2026, he debuted with Galatasaray in a 2–1 Turkish Cup win over Fethiyespor. On 22 February 2026, he signed his first professional contract with Galatasaray.

== International career ==
Yüzgeç is a youth international for Turkey, scoring 8 goals in 9 matches for the Turkey U15s team, 10 goals in 15 matches for the Turkey U16s.

== Honours ==
Galatasaray

- Süper Lig: 2025–26
