= 2020–21 Çaykur Rizespor season =

Çaykur Rizespor
2020–21 season
- Chairman: Hasan Kartal
- Manager: Stjepan Tomas (until 19 January 2021); Marius Șumudică (from 25 January 2021)
- Stadium: Yeni Rize Şehir Stadium
- Süper Lig: 13th
- Turkish Cup: Round of 16
- Top goalscorer: League: Milan Škoda (9 goals); All: Braian Samudio; Milan Škoda (9 each)
Home colours	Away colours	Third colours

The 2020–21 season was Çaykur Rizespor's 68th season in existence and the club's third consecutive season in the top flight of Turkish football. In addition to the domestic league, Çaykur Rizespor participated in this season's editions of the Turkish Cup. The season covers the period from July 2020 to 30 June 2021.

== Players ==
=== Squad ===
As of 5 October 2020

Note: Flags indicate national team as defined under FIFA eligibility rules; some limited exceptions apply. Players may hold more than one non-FIFA nationality.

No.	Pos.	Nation	Player
1	GK	TUR	Tarık Çetin
3	DF	GRE	Dimitrios Chatziisaias
4	DF	TUN	Montassar Talbi
5	MF	TUR	Abdullah Durak (captain)
6	MF	AUT	Yasin Pehlivan
7	FW	FRA	Loïc Rémy
8	MF	BRA	Fabricio Baiano
9	FW	TUR	Kemal Rüzgar
10	MF	BRA	Fernando Boldrin
11	FW	TUR	Tunay Torun
13	DF	TUR	İsmail Köybaşı
15	DF	TUR	Selim Ay
17	FW	POL	Konrad Michalak (on loan from Akhmat Grozny)
18	FW	PAR	Braian Samudio
19	MF	SRB	Dušan Jovančić
21	FW	CZE	Milan Škoda
22	DF	TUR	Emir Han Topçu

No.	Pos.	Nation	Player
23	MF	GHA	Godfred Donsah (on loan from Bologna)
24	DF	AUT	Emir Dilaver
25	GK	TUR	Gökhan Akkan
26	MF	TUR	Onur Bulut (on loan from Alanyaspor)
27	DF	TUR	Murat Sağlam (on loan from Fenerbahçe)
28	MF	CIV	Ismaël Diomandé
30	GK	TUR	Zafer Görgen
35	DF	TUR	Alberk Koç
37	FW	BRA	Fernando Andrade (on loan from Porto)
50	FW	NGR	Aminu Umar
53	DF	CRO	Dario Melnjak
54	MF	TUR	Mithat Pala
55	DF	UKR	Mykola Morozyuk
66	MF	TUR	Doğan Erdoğan
80	DF	TUN	Yassine Meriah (on loan from Olympiacos)
95	GK	TUR	Boğaçhan Kazmaz

=== Out on loan ===
Note: Flags indicate national team as defined under FIFA eligibility rules; some limited exceptions apply. Players may hold more than one non-FIFA nationality.

No. / Pos. / Nation / Player; 14 / DF / TUR / Yusuf Acer (at BB Erzurumspor)	No. / Pos. / Nation / Player; 99 / FW / TUR / Eren Karadağ (at Esenler Erokspor)

== Transfers ==
=== In ===
No.	Pos	Player	Transferred from	Fee	Date	Source
24	FW	(Poland) Konrad Michalak	(Russia) Akhmat Grozny	Loan	24 August 2020	
7	FW	(France) Loïc Rémy	(France) Lille	Free	28 August 2020	
37	FW	(Brazil) Fernando Andrade	(Portugal) Porto	Loan	2 October 2020	
26	GK	(Turkey) Onur Bulut	(Turkey) Alanyaspor	Loan	4 October 2020	
80	DF	(Tunisia) Yassine Meriah	(Greece) Olympiacos	Loan	12 September 2020	
27	MF	(Turkey) Murat Sağlam	(Turkey) Fenerbahçe	Loan	4 October 2020	
23	MF	(Ghana) Godfred Donsah	(Italy) Bologna	Loan	5 October 2020	

=== Out ===
No.	Pos	Player	Transferred to	Fee	Date	Source
15			TBD		1 July 2020	

== Pre-season and friendlies ==
Win Draw Loss Fixtures

19 August 2020 Friendly	Çaykur Rizespor (Turkey)	0–2	(Turkey) Alanyaspor
17:00 TRT (UTC+3)

== Competitions ==
=== Overview ===
Competition	First match	Last match	Starting round	Final position	Record							
Competition	First match	Last match	Starting round	Final position	Pld	W	D	L	GF	GA	GD	Win %
Süper Lig	11 September 2020	15 May 2021	Matchday 1	13th	40	12	12	16	53	69	−16	30.00
Turkish Cup	25 November 2020	13 January 2021	Fourth round	Round of 16	3	2	0	1	9	1	+8	66.67
Total					43	14	12	17	62	70	−8	32.56

Last updated: 15 May 2021
Source: Soccerway

=== Süper Lig ===
==== League table ====
Pos	Team	Pld	W	D	L	GF	GA	GD	Pts
11	Konyaspor	40	12	14	14	49	48	+1	50
12	Başakşehir	40	12	12	16	43	55	−12	48
13	Çaykur Rizespor	40	12	12	16	53	69	−16	48
14	Kasımpaşa	40	12	10	18	47	57	−10	46
15	Yeni Malatyaspor	40	10	15	15	49	53	−4	45

Source: Süper Lig, Soccerway
Rules for classification: 1) Points; 2) Head-to-head points; 3) Head-to-head goal difference; 4) Head-to-head goals scored; 5) Goal difference; 6) Goals scored; 7) Play-off.

==== Results summary ====
Overall								Home						Away					
Pld	W	D	L	GF	GA	GD	Pts	W	D	L	GF	GA	GD	W	D	L	GF	GA	GD
40	12	12	16	53	69	−16	48	7	7	6	27	30	−3	5	5	10	26	39	−13

Last updated: 15 May 2021.
Source: FBref

==== Results by round ====
Round	1	2	3	4	5	6	7	8	9	10	11	12	13	14	15	16	17	18	19	20	21	22	23	24	25	26	27	28	29	30	31	32	33	34	35	36	37	38	39	40	41	42
Ground	H	A	H	A	H	A	H	B	A	H	A	H	A	H	A	H	A	H	A	H	A	A	H	A	H	A	H	A	B	H	A	H	A	H	A	H	A	H	A	H	A	H
Result	L	L	D	D	W	W	W	B	D	L	L	W	L	W	D	D	L	D	L	W	D	L	D	L	L	D	D	L	B	W	W	D	L	D	W	W	L	L	W	L	W	L
Position	12	20	18	18	13	6	5	9	11	12	15	13	15	12	12	10	12	15	16	13	13	13	13	13	14	15	15	16	17	14	12	13	13	14	13	11	12	13	12	12	12	13

Updated to match(es) played on 15 May 2021. Source: FBref
A = Away; H = Home; B = Bye; W = Win; D = Draw; L = Loss

Note: Since the league has been expanded to 21 teams each team will earn a bye twice this season.

==== Matches ====
11 September 2020 1	Çaykur Rizespor	1–2	Fenerbahçe	Rize
20:00 TRT (UTC+3)	Škoda 59'; Morozyuk (yellow card) 85'	Report	Erkin 32'; Kadıoğlu (yellow card) 40'; Gönül 76'; Gümüş (yellow card) 82'; Sosa 87' (pen.)	Stadium: Yeni Rize Şehir Stadium; Referee: Arda Kardeşler

20 September 2020 2	Kasımpaşa	2–0	Çaykur Rizespor	Istanbul
16:00 TRT (UTC+3)	Varga 13' (yellow card) 86'; Kara (yellow card) 20'; Alan Cariús 60'; Serbest (yellow card) 83'; Koç (red card) 80'	Report	Durak (yellow card) 73'	Stadium: Recep Tayyip Erdoğan Stadium; Referee: Suat Arslanboğa

27 September 2020 3	Çaykur Rizespor	1–1	Alanyaspor	Rize
14:30 TRT (UTC+3)	Fabrício Baiano (yellow card) 77'; Rémy 81'; Pehlivan (yellow card) 90+4'	Report	Pektemek 69'; Juanfran (yellow card) 90+3'	Stadium: Yeni Rize Şehir Stadium; Attendance: 0 Referee: Fırat Aydınus

3 October 2020 4	BB Erzurumspor	0–0	Çaykur Rizespor	Erzurum
16:00 TRT (UTC+3)		Report		Stadium: Kazım Karabekir Stadium; Attendance: 0 Referee: Umit Öztürk

17 October 2020 5	Çaykur Rizespor	5–3	Ankaragücü	Rize
13:30 TRT (UTC+3)	Fernando 19'; Fernando Boldrin 45+1'; Loïc Rémy 55' (pen.), 62' (pen.), 78'	Report	Paintsil 6', 16'; Børven 43' (yellow card) 81'; Potuk (yellow card) 38' (yellow-red card) 45+3'	Stadium: Yeni Rize Şehir Stadium; Attendance: 0 Referee: Abdulkadir Bitigen

26 October 2020 6	Sivasspor	0–2	Çaykur Rizespor	Sivas
20:00 TRT (UTC+3)		Report	Baiano 3'; Rémy 90+1'	Stadium: New Sivas 4 Eylül Stadium; Attendance: 0 Referee: Yaşar Kemal Uğurlu

1 November 2020 7	Çaykur Rizespor	1–0	Kayserispor	Rize
13:30 TRT (UTC+3)	Rémy 33'	Report		Stadium: Yeni Rize Şehir Stadium; Referee: Koray Gençerler

8	Bye

22 November 2020 9	Hatayspor	2–2	Çaykur Rizespor	Antakya
13:30 TRT (UTC+3)	Aabid 35'; Boupendza 90+7'	Report	Diouf 12' (o.g.); Boldrin 64'	Stadium: Hatay New Stadium; Attendance: 0 Referee: Halis Özkahya

28 November 2020 10	Çaykur Rizespor	0–4	Galatasaray	Rize
19:00 TRT (UTC+3)	Baiano (yellow card) 23'; Melnjak (yellow card) 44'; Emir (yellow card) 44'; Morozyuk (yellow card) 64'; Boldrin (yellow card) 9' (yellow-red card) 77'	Report	Diagne 45', 52', 79'; Fatih (yellow card) 78'; Taylan 87'	Stadium: Yeni Rize Şehir Stadium; Attendance: 0 Referee: Atilla Karaoğlan

6 December 2020 11	Fatih Karagümrük	2–1	Çaykur Rizespor	Istanbul
13:30 TRT (UTC+3)	Ndao 15', 25'	Report	Meriah 20'	Stadium: Atatürk Olympic Stadium; Attendance: 0 Referee: Umit Öztürk

12 December 2020 12	Çaykur Rizespor	3–2	Göztepe	Rize
16:00 TRT (UTC+3)		Report		Stadium: Yeni Rize Şehir Stadium; Referee: Özgür Yankaya

19 December 2020 13	Trabzonspor	2–1	Çaykur Rizespor	Trabzon
16:00 TRT (UTC+3)	Caleb Ekuban 53' (pen.); Djaniny 65'; Kamil Çörekçi (yellow card) 90+3'	Report	Godfred Donsah (yellow card) 14'; Milan Škoda 36' (pen.); Tunay Torun (yellow card) 46'; Fernando Andrade (yellow card) 55'; Emir Dilaver (yellow card) 76'	Stadium: Şenol Güneş Stadium; Referee: Ali Şansalan

24 December 2020 14	Çaykur Rizespor	2–1	Antalyaspor	Rize
19:00 TRT (UTC+3)		Report		Stadium: Yeni Rize Şehir Stadium; Referee: Erkan Özdamar

28 December 2020 15	Konyaspor	1–1	Çaykur Rizespor	Konya
16:00 TRT (UTC+3)	Hadžiahmetović 7'	Report	Torun 65'; Pehlivan (red card) 90+5'	Stadium: Konya Büyükşehir Stadium; Referee: Burak Şeker

3 January 2021 16	Çaykur Rizespor	1–1	Gençlerbirliği	Rize
13:30 TRT (UTC+3)	Škoda 8'	Report	Dikmen 64'	Stadium: Yeni Rize Şehir Stadium; Referee: Suat Arslanboga

6 January 2021 17	Beşiktaş	6–0	Çaykur Rizespor	Istanbul
19:00 TRT (UTC+3)	Larin 19', 31', 79', 83'; Welinton (yellow card) 42'; Souza (yellow card) 44'; Özyakup 56'; Hasić 89'	Report		Stadium: Vodafone Park; Attendance: 0 Referee: Ümit Öztürk
Note: Match was played behind closed doors due to the COVID-19 pandemic in Turkey.

10 January 2021 18	Çaykur Rizespor	1–1	Denizlispor	Rize
16:00 TRT (UTC+3)	Rüzgar 90+3'	Report	Rodallega 9'	Stadium: Yeni Rize Şehir Stadium; Attendance: 0 Referee: Volkan Bayarslan

17 January 2021 19	Yeni Malatyaspor	4–1	Çaykur Rizespor	Malatya
16:00 TRT (UTC+3)	Kanatsızkuş 46', 50'; Bulut 61'; Eskihellaç 74'	Report	Škoda 30' (pen.)	Stadium: Malatya Arena; Attendance: 0 Referee: Hüseyin Göçek

20 January 2021 20	Çaykur Rizespor	3–0	Gaziantep	Rize
16:00 TRT (UTC+3)	Škoda 42', 55' (pen.); Braian Samudio 88' (pen.)	Report		Stadium: Yeni Rize Şehir Stadium; Attendance: 0 Referee: Halis Özkahya
Note: Match was played behind closed doors due to the COVID-19 pandemic in Turkey.

23 January 2021 21	İstanbul Başakşehir	1–1	Çaykur Rizespor	Istanbul
19:00 TRT (UTC+3)	Topal 64'	Report	Samudio 48' (pen.)	Stadium: Başakşehir Fatih Terim Stadium; Attendance: 0 Referee: Ümit Öztürk

30 January 2021 22	Fenerbahçe	1–0	Çaykur Rizespor	Istanbul
19:00 TRT (UTC+3)	Gökhan Akkan 45' (o.g.); Serdar Aziz (yellow card) 55'	Report	(yellow card) 43' Dario Melnjak; (yellow card) 63' (yellow-red card) 86' Fabricio Baiano; (yellow card) 66' Fernando Boldrin; (yellow card) 86' Fernando	Stadium: Şükrü Saracoğlu Stadium; Attendance: 0 Referee: Abdulkadir Bitigen

2 February 2021 23	Çaykur Rizespor	1–1	Kasımpaşa	Rize
19:00 TRT (UTC+3)	Erdoğan 85'	Report	Thelin 90+1'	Stadium: Yeni Rize Şehir Stadium; Attendance: 0 Referee: Serkan Tokat

6 February 2021 24	Alanyaspor	2–1	Çaykur Rizespor	Alanya
16:00 TRT (UTC+3)	Bareiro 32' (pen.); Pektemek 90+6'	Report	Talbi 25'	Stadium: Bahçeşehir Okulları Stadium; Attendance: 0 Referee: Mete Kalkavan

12 February 2021 25	Çaykur Rizespor	0–2	BB Erzurumspor	Rize
19:00 TRT (UTC+3)	Fernando (yellow card) 77' (yellow-red card) 83'	Report	Chahechouhe 67'; Oltan Karakullukçu 90+2'	Stadium: Yeni Rize Şehir Stadium; Attendance: 0 Referee: Cüneyt Çakιr

22 February 2021 26	Ankaragücü	1–1	Çaykur Rizespor	Ankara
19:00 TRT (UTC+3)	Børven 45+2'	Report	Donsah 3'	Stadium: Eryaman Stadium; Attendance: 0 Referee: Halis Özkahya

27 February 2021 27	Çaykur Rizespor	0–0	Sivasspor	Rize
16:00 TRT (UTC+3)	Sabo (yellow card) 7'; Pehlivan (yellow card) 40'; Meriah (yellow card) 55'	Report	Yeşilyurt (red card) 32'; Erdal (yellow card) 73'; Kayode (yellow card) 90+3'	Stadium: Yeni Rize Şehir Stadium; Attendance: 0 Referee: Özgür Yankaya

3 March 2021 28	Kayserispor	2–1	Çaykur Rizespor	Kayseri
19:00 TRT (UTC+3)	Muhar 48'; Parlak 77'	Report	Samudio 73'	Stadium: Kadir Has Stadium; Attendance: 0 Referee: Hüseyin Göçek

29	Bye

14 March 2021 30	Çaykur Rizespor	1–0	Hatayspor	Rize
16:00 TRT (UTC+3)	Boldrin 71'	Report		Stadium: Yeni Rize Şehir Stadium; Attendance: 0 Referee: Suat Arslanboga

19 March 2021 31	Galatasaray	3–4	Çaykur Rizespor	Istanbul
19:00 TRT (UTC+3)	Yedlin 14', (yellow card) 52' (yellow-red card) 78'; Akbaba 31'; Luyindama (yellow card) 45+3'; Meriah 74' (o.g.); Marcão (yellow card) 88'	Report	Samudio 2'; Selim (yellow card) 35'; Boldrin 41'; Morozyuk (yellow card) 45+1'; Škoda 54' (pen.); Fernando 90+3'	Stadium: Türk Telekom Stadium; Attendance: 0 Referee: Volkan Bayarslan

3 April 2021 32	Çaykur Rizespor	0–0	Fatih Karagümrük	Rize
15:00 TRT (UTC+3)		Report		Stadium: Yeni Rize Şehir Stadium; Attendance: 0 Referee: Ümit Öztürk

6 April 2021 33	Göztepe	2–0	Çaykur Rizespor	İzmir
16:00 TRT (UTC+3)	Akbunar 56'; Ndiaye 77'	Report		Stadium: Gürsel Aksel Stadium; Attendance: 0 Referee: Mustafa Öğretmenoğlu

10 April 2021 34	Çaykur Rizespor	0–0	Trabzonspor	Rize
16:00 TRT (UTC+3)	Pehlivan (yellow card) 18'; Baiano (yellow card) 45'; Selim (yellow card) 71'; Köybaşı (yellow card) 77'	Report	Hugo (yellow card) 68' (yellow-red card) 86'; Parmak (yellow card) 73'	Stadium: Yeni Rize Şehir Stadium; Attendance: 0 Referee: Cüneyt Çakır

16 April 2021 35	Antalyaspor	2–3	Çaykur Rizespor	Antalya
19:00 TRT (UTC+3)	Sarı (yellow card) 27', (goal) 33'; Podolski (yellow card) 49'; Naldo 87'	Report	Köybaşı 3'; Boldrin 5'; Sabo 65'; Baiano (yellow card) 71'; Pehlivan (yellow card) 90+3'	Stadium: Antalya Stadium; Attendance: 0 Referee: Suat Arslanboğa

20 April 2021 36	Çaykur Rizespor	5–3	Konyaspor	Rize
16:00 TRT (UTC+3)	Đoković 21'; Michalak 27'; Rémy 68'; Samudio 74'; Demirbağ 82' (o.g.)	Report	Guilherme 6'; Cikalleshi 11'; Kravets 85'	Stadium: Yeni Rize Şehir Stadium; Attendance: 0 Referee: Özgür Yankaya

23 April 2021 37	Gençlerbirliği	2–1	Çaykur Rizespor	Ankara
20:30 TRT (UTC+3)	Johansson 45+1'; Sio 62'	Report	Samudio 74'	Stadium: Eryaman Stadium; Attendance: 0 Referee: Bahattin Şimşek

28 April 2021 38	Çaykur Rizespor	2–3	Beşiktaş	Rize
20:30 TRT (UTC+3)	Pehlivan (yellow card) 72'; Köybaşı 87'; Đoković 89', (yellow card) 90+4'	Report	Nkoudou 16'; Ljajić (yellow card) 36'; Töre 57'; Ghezzal 75'	Stadium: Yeni Rize Şehir Stadium; Attendance: 0 Referee: Abdulkadir Bitigen

2 May 2021 39	Denizlispor	0–1	Çaykur Rizespor	Denizli
16:00 TRT (UTC+3)			Samudio 72'	Stadium: Denizli Atatürk Stadium; Attendance: 0 Referee: Hüseyin Göcek

8 May 2021 40	Çaykur Rizespor	0–4	Yeni Malatyaspor	Rize
20:30 TRT (UTC+3)				Stadium: Yeni Rize Şehir Stadium; Attendance: 0 Referee: Yaşar Kemal Uğurlu

11 May 2021 41	Gaziantep	4–5	Çaykur Rizespor	Gaziantep
20:30 TRT (UTC+3)	Maxim 47'; Demir 48', 86'; Djilobodji 88'		Torun 6'; Köybaşı 31'; Søderlund 45+2'; Sabo 59' (pen.); Samudio 79'	Stadium: Gaziantep Stadium; Attendance: 0 Referee: Zorbay Kücük

15 May 2021 42	Çaykur Rizespor	0–2	İstanbul Başakşehir	Rize
18:00 TRT (UTC+3)	Samudio (yellow card) 76'	Report	Aleksić 6' (pen.), 45+1'	Stadium: Yeni Rize Şehir Stadium; Attendance: 0 Referee: Koray Gençerler

=== Turkish Cup ===
25 November 2020 Fourth round	Çaykur Rizespor	6–0	Uşak Spor	Rize
21:00 TRT (UTC+3)	Torun 12', 45'; Michalak 54'; Rüzgar 43', 85' (pen.), 90'	Report		Stadium: Yeni Rize Şehir Stadium; Referee: Emre Malok

15 December 2020 Fifth round	Çaykur Rizespor	3–0	Eskişehirspor	Rize
15:00 TRT (UTC+3)	Rüzgar 5'; Samudio 12'; Torun 15'	Report		Stadium: Yeni Rize Şehir Stadium; Referee: Hakan Ceylan

13 January 2021 Round of 16	Beşiktaş	1–0	Çaykur Rizespor	Istanbul
20:45 TRT (UTC+3)	Özyakup (yellow card) 36'; Larin 85'; Yuvakuran (yellow card) 90+3'	Report	Erdoğan (yellow card) 38'	Stadium: Vodafone Park; Referee: Sarper Barış Saka

== Statistics ==
=== Goalscorers ===
Rank	No.	Pos	Nat	Name	Süper Lig	Turkish Cup	Total
1	18	FW	(Paraguay)	Braian Samudio	8	1	9
1	21	FW	(Czech Republic)	Milan Škoda	9	0	9
3	7	FW	(France)	Loïc Rémy	7	0	7
4	27	MF	(Brazil)	Fernando Boldrin	6	0	6
5	9	FW	(Turkey)	Kemal Rüzgar	1	4	5
5	11	FW	(Turkey)	Tunay Torun	2	3	5
7	13	DF	(Turkey)	İsmail Köybaşı	3	0	3
8	8	MF	(Croatia)	Damjan Đoković	2	0	2
8	17	FW	(Poland)	Konrad Michalak	1	1	2
8	37	FW	(Brazil)	Fernando	2	0	2
8	52	MF	(Slovakia)	Erik Sabo	2	0	2
12	4	DF	(Tunisia)	Montassar Talbi	1	0	1
12	6	MF	(Austria)	Yasin Pehlivan	1	0	1
12	8	MF	(Brazil)	Fabrício Baiano	1	0	1
12	14	FW	(Norway)	Alexander Søderlund	1	0	1
12	23	MF	(Ghana)	Godfred Donsah	1	0	1
12	66	MF	(Turkey)	Doğan Erdoğan	1	0	1
12	80	DF	(Tunisia)	Yassine Meriah	1	0	1
Own goals					2	0	2
Totals					53	9	62

Last updated: 15 May 2021

=== Clean sheets ===
Rank	No.	Pos	Nat	Name	Süper Lig	Turkish Cup	Total
1	25	GK	(Turkey)	Gökhan Akkan	7	0	7
2	1	GK	(Turkey)	Tarık Çetin	1	2	3
3	30	GK	(Turkey)	Zafer Görgen	1	0	1
Totals					9	2	11

Last updated: 15 May 2021
