= 2019–20 Çaykur Rizespor season =

Çaykur Rizespor
2019–20 season
- Chairman: Hasan Kartal
- Manager: Ünal Karaman
- Stadium: Yeni Rize Şehir Stadium
- Süper Lig: 15
- Turkish Cup: Round of 16
Home colours	Away colours	Third colours

The 2019–20 season was Çaykur Rizespor's 67th year in existence. In addition to the domestic league, Çaykur Rizespor participated in the Turkish Cup.

== Squad ==
As of 9 July 2020

Note: Flags indicate national team as defined under FIFA eligibility rules; some limited exceptions apply. Players may hold more than one non-FIFA nationality.

No.	Pos.	Nation	Player
3	DF	MAR	Mohamed Abarhoun
4	DF	TUN	Montassar Talbi
5	MF	TUR	Abdullah Durak
8	MF	GER	Atakan Akkaynak (on loan from Willem II)
10	MF	BRA	Fernando Boldrin
13	GK	TUR	Tarık Çetin
18	FW	PAR	Braian Samudio
19	FW	NGR	Aminu Umar
20	MF	UKR	Denys Harmash (on loan from Dynamo Kyiv)
21	FW	CZE	Milan Škoda
22	DF	TUR	Emir Han Topçu
23	GK	TUR	Gökhan Akkan
27	MF	CIV	Ismaël Diomandé
28	DF	TUR	Burak Albayrak

No.	Pos.	Nation	Player
29	MF	TUR	Tunay Torun
30	GK	TUR	Zafer Görgen
35	DF	TUR	Alberk Koç
44	MF	SLO	Amedej Vetrih
53	DF	CRO	Dario Melnjak
55	DF	UKR	Mykola Morozyuk
64	DF	POR	Ivanildo Fernandes (on loan from Sporting B)
66	MF	TUR	Oğuz Kağan Güçtekin (on loan from Fenerbahçe)
70	MF	BRA	Yan Sasse (on loan from Coritiba)
77	DF	TUR	Orhan Ovacıklı (captain)
92	DF	TUR	Berkay Sandıkçı
95	GK	TUR	Boğaçhan Kazmaz
96	FW	UKR	Andriy Boryachuk (on loan from Shakhtar Donetsk)
97	FW	TUR	Muhammet Çelik

== Süper Lig ==
=== League table ===
Pos	Team	Pld	W	D	L	GF	GA	GD	Pts
13	Konyaspor	34	8	12	14	36	52	−16	36 (Note: Head-to-head points: Gençlerbirliği 4, Konyaspor 1)
14	Denizlispor	34	9	8	17	31	48	−17	35 (Note: Head-to-head points: Denizlispor 4, Rizespor 1)
15	Rizespor	34	10	5	19	38	57	−19	35
16	Yeni Malatyaspor	34	8	8	18	44	51	−7	32 (Note: Head-to-head points: Yeni Malatyaspor 6, Kayserispor 5, Ankaragücü 5. Head-to-head goal difference: Yeni Malatyaspor +6, Kayserispor -3, Ankaragücü -3. Head-to-head goals scored: Yeni Malatyaspor 9, Kayserispor 4, Ankaragücü 3.)
17	Kayserispor	34	8	8	18	40	72	−32	32

Source: Süper Lig, Soccerway
Rules for classification: 1) Points; 2) Head-to-head points; 3) Head-to-head goal difference; 4) Head-to-head goals scored; 5) Goal difference; 6) Goals scored; 7) Play-off.

=== Results summary ===
Overall								Home						Away					
Pld	W	D	L	GF	GA	GD	Pts	W	D	L	GF	GA	GD	W	D	L	GF	GA	GD
32	9	5	18	34	54	−20	32	7	3	6	23	20	+3	2	2	12	11	34	−23

Source: TFF

=== Results by round ===
Round	1	2	3	4	5	6	7	8	9	10	11	12	13	14	15	16	17	18	19	20	21	22	23	24	25	26	27	28	29	30	31	32	33	34
Ground	A	H	A	H	H	A	H	A	H	A	H	A	H	A	H	A	H	H	A	H	A	A	H	A	H	A	H	A	H	A	H	A	H	A
Result	W	W	D	D	L	L	L	L	W	L	W	L	W	L	L	W	L	W	D	L	L	L	L	L	D	L	W	L	D	L	W	L		
Position	7	4	4	2	6	12	14	16	13	15	10	12	11	12	13	12	12	11	11	11	12	13	14	14	14	16	14	15	14	17	15	16		

Updated to match(es) played on 16 July 2020. Source: TFF.org
A = Away; H = Home; W = Win; D = Draw; L = Loss

== Matches ==
August 17, 2019 1	Gençlerbirliği	0 - 1	Çaykur Rizespor	Ankara
19.15	Flávio Ramos (yellow card) 36' (yellow card) 39' (red card); Daniel Candeias (yellow card) 74'; Rahmetullah Berişbek (yellow card) 86'	Report	66' Dario Melnjak; (yellow card) 69' Nill De Pauw; (yellow card) 89' Braian Samudio	Stadium: Eryaman Stadium; Referee: Bahattin Şimşek; Assistant referees: Osman Gökhan Bilir, Kamil Çetin; Fourth official: Ferhan Kestanlıoğlu; Fifth official: Ali Şansalan, Burak Şeker

August 25, 2019 2	Çaykur Rizespor	2 - 1	Sivasspor	Rize
19.15	Braian Samudio 54' (pen.); Fernando Boldrin 58'; Oğulcan Çağlayan (yellow card) 81'; Joseph Larweh Attamah (yellow card) 90'	Report	(yellow card) 52' Aaron Appindangoyé; (yellow card) 65' Emre Kılınç; 79' Fernando	Stadium: Yeni Rize Şehir Stadium; Referee: Fırat Aydınus; Assistant referees: Aleks Taşçıoğlu, Erdem Bayık; Fourth official: Onur Özütoprak; Fifth official: Hüseyin Göçek, Kadir Sağlam

August 31, 2019 3	Beşiktaş	1 - 1	Çaykur Rizespor	Istanbul
21.45	Jeremain Lens (yellow card) 7'; Domagoj Vida 53'; Dorukhan Toköz (yellow card) 56'; Adem Ljajić (yellow card) 74'; Pedro Rebocho (yellow card) 90'; Georges-Kévin Nkoudou (yellow card) 90'	Report	37' Oğulcan Çağlayan; (yellow card) 58' Mykola Morozyuk	Stadium: Vodafone Park; Referee: Yaşar Kemal Uğurlu; Assistant referees: Kerem Ersoy, Mehmet Cem Hanoğlu; Fourth official: Murat Erdoğan; Fifth official: Koray Gençerler, Kemal Yılmaz

September 15, 2019 4	Çaykur Rizespor	0 - 0	Göztepe	Rize
17.00	Joseph Larweh Attamah (yellow card) 53'; Fernando Boldrin (yellow card) 90'; Dario Melnjak (yellow card) 90'	Report	(yellow card) 25' Halil Akbunar; (yellow card) 45' Márcio Mossoró; (yellow card) 84' Alpaslan Öztürk; (yellow card) 90' Berkan Emir	Stadium: Yeni Rize Şehir Stadium; Referee: Abdulkadir Bitigen; Assistant referees: Mustafa Savranlar, Mehmet Salih Mazlum; Fourth official: Adem Sarıtaş; Fifth official: Özgüç Türkalp, Alper Çetin

September 22, 2019 5	Çaykur Rizespor	1 - 2	Gazişehir Gaziantep	Rize
14.00	Yan Sasse (yellow card) 59'; Braian Samudio 65'; Joseph Larweh Attamah (yellow card) 73'	Report	12' Muhammet Demir; 16' Patrick Twumasi; (yellow card) 70' Souleymane Diarra; (yellow card) 75' Oğuz Ceylan	Stadium: Yeni Rize Şehir Stadium; Attendance: 6.214; Referee: Serkan Tokat; Assistant referees: Candaş Elbil, Bilal Gölen; Fourth official: Mustafa Aydın; Fifth official: Bahattin Şimşek, Çağdaş Altay

September 27, 2019 6	İstanbul Başakşehir	5 - 0	Çaykur Rizespor	Istanbul
20.30	Danijel Aleksić 18', 73'; Fredrik Gulbrandsen 33'; Enzo Crivelli 87'; İrfan Kahveci 90'	Report	(yellow card) 62' Dario Melnjak; (yellow card) 72' Yan Sasse	Stadium: Başakşehir Fatih Terim Stadium; Attendance: 2.815; Referee: Fırat Aydınus; Assistant referees: Aleks Taşçıoğlu, Süleyman Özay; Fourth official: Cihan Ataş; Fifth official: Hüseyin Göçek, Kemal Yılmaz

October 6, 2019 7	Çaykur Rizespor	1 - 2	Trabzonspor	Rize
19.00	Dimitris Chatziisaias (yellow card) 14'; Dario Melnjak 23'; Ismaël Diomandé (yellow card) 33'; Fernando Boldrin (yellow card) 68'; Mykola Morozyuk (yellow card) 75'; Abdullah Durak (yellow card) 90+4'	Report	(yellow card) 6' John Obi Mikel; (yellow card) 14' Kamil Çörekçi; 73' Alexander Sørloth; 90' Anthony Nwakaeme	Stadium: Yeni Rize Şehir Stadium; Attendance: 7.613; Referee: Hüseyin Göçek; Assistant referees: Alpaslan Dedeş, Erdem Bayık; Fourth official: Kadir Sağlam; Fifth official: Zorbay Küçük, İbrahim Çağlar Uyarcan

October 20, 2019 8	Alanyaspor	5 - 2	Çaykur Rizespor	Alanya, Antalya
16.30	Ceyhun Gülselam 16'; Papiss Cissé 29', 76'; Anastasios Bakasetas 51'; Júnior Fernándes 70'	Report	(yellow card) 33' Braian Samudio; 65' (pen.) 73' (pen.) Fernando Boldrin	Stadium: Bahçeşehir Okulları Stadium; Attendance: 5.286; Referee: Cüneyt Çakır; Assistant referees: Bahattin Duran, Tarık Ongun; Fourth official: Erkan Engin; Fifth official: Özgüç Türkalp, Çağdaş Altay

October 25, 2019 9	Çaykur Rizespor	2 - 0	MKE Ankaragücü	Rize
20.30	Braian Samudio 29' (pen.); Oğulcan Çağlayan (yellow card) 49'; Fernando Boldrin 59'	Report	(yellow card) 28' Alihan Kubalas; (yellow card) 52' Ante Kulušić; (yellow card) 75' Stelios Kitsiou	Stadium: Yeni Rize Şehir Stadium; Attendance: 6.151; Referee: Koray Gençerler; Assistant referees: Serkan Ok, Yusuf Bozdoğan; Fourth official: Mustafa Kürşad Filiz; Fifth official: Volkan Bayarslan, Mustafa Emre Eyisoy

November 1, 2019 10	Galatasaray	2 - 0	Çaykur Rizespor	Istanbul
20.30	Montassar Talbi 15' (o.g.); Ryan Babel 18' (pen.)	Report	(yellow card) 42' Ismaël Diomandé; (yellow card) 64' Oğulcan Çağlayan; (yellow card) 71' Montassar Talbi	Stadium: Türk Telekom Stadium; Attendance: 29.563; Referee: Abdulkadir Bitigen; Assistant referees: İbrahim Çağlar Uyarcan, Volkan Ahmet Narinç; Fourth official: Cihan Aydın; Fifth official: Ali Şansalan, Serkan Olguncan

November 9, 2019 11	Çaykur Rizespor	1 - 0	Antalyaspor	Rize
17.30	Mohamed Aberhoun 26'; Mykola Morozyuk (yellow card) 44'; Tarık Çetin (red card) 53'; Amedej Vetrih (yellow card) 71'	Report	(yellow card) 49' Amilton Minervino da Silva; (yellow card) 59' Gustavo Blanco Leschuk; (yellow card) 61' Serdar Özkan; (yellow card) 70' Eren Albayrak	Stadium: Yeni Rize Şehir Stadium; Attendance: 5.992; Referee: Yaşar Kemal Uğurlu; Assistant referees: Cem Satman, Asım Yusuf Öz; Fourth official: Yalçın Taşkınfurat; Fifth official: Ümit Öztürk, Kadir Sağlam

November 23, 2019 12	Denizlispor	2 - 0	Çaykur Rizespor	Denizli
15.00	Burak Çalık (yellow card) 11'; Radosław Murawski (yellow card) 41'; Zakarya Bergdich (yellow card) 70'; Óscar Estupiñán 86'; Radosław Murawski 90' (pen.)	Report	(yellow card) 29' Abdullah Durak; (yellow card) 69' Yan Sasse; (yellow card) 78' Marko Šćepović	Stadium: Atatürk Stadyumu; Attendance: 5.672; Referee: Halil Umut Meler; Assistant referees: İlker Takpak, Murat Ergin Gözütok; Fourth official: Burak Pakkan; Fifth official: Atilla Karaoğlan, İbrahim Çağlar Uyarcan

November 30, 2019 13	Çaykur Rizespor	3 - 1	Konyaspor	Rize
15.00	Oğulcan Çağlayan 3'; Aminu Umar 10'; Yan Sasse 74'	Report	11' Deni Milošević	Stadium: Yeni Rize Şehir Stadium; Attendance: 5.417; Referee: Halis Özkahya; Assistant referees: Ekrem Kan, İbrahim Bozbey; Fourth official: Abdullah Buğra Taşkınsoy; Fifth official: Mustafa Öğretmenoğlu, Cevdet Kömürcüoğlu

December 9, 2019 14	Kayserispor	1 - 0	Çaykur Rizespor	Kayseri
20.00	Artem Kravets 9'; Hasan Hüseyin Acar (yellow card) 69'; Silviu Lung Jr. (yellow card) 89'	Report	(yellow card) 37' Amedej Vetrih; (yellow card) 68' Mohamed Abarhoun; (yellow card) 81' Orhan Ovacıklı	Stadium: Kadir Has Şehir Stadyumu; Attendance: 4.500; Referee: Fırat Aydınus; Assistant referees: Aleks Taşçıoğlu-Erdem Bayık; Fourth official: Çağdaş Altay

December 14, 2019 15	Çaykur Rizespor	0 - 3	Kasımpaşa	Rize
15.00	Fernando Boldrin (penalty missed) 49'; Ismaël Diomandé (yellow card) 62' (yellow card) 79' (red card); Amedej Vetrih (yellow card) 62'; Orhan Ovacıklı (yellow card) 88'; Mohamed Abarhoun (yellow card) 90+3'	Report		Stadium: Yeni Rize Şehir Stadium; Attendance: 5.101; Referee: Ümit Öztürk; Assistant referees: Osman Gökhan Bilir, Kamil Çetin; Fourth official: Bilal Köseoğlu; Fifth official: Koray Gençerler, Burak Şeker

December 21, 2019 16	Yeni Malatyaspor	0 - 2	Çaykur Rizespor	Malatya
15.00	Mustafa Akbaş (yellow card) 19'; Robin Yalçın (yellow card) 45+1'	Report	6' Oğulcan Çağlayan; (yellow card) 52' (goal) 72' Aminu Umar; (yellow card) 70' Mykola Morozyuk; (yellow card) 75' Ismaël Diomandé	Stadium: Malatya Arena; Attendance: 5.841; Referee: Ali Palabıyık; Assistant referees: Serkan Olguncan, Serkan Çimen; Fourth official: Mustafa İlker Çoşkun; Fifth official: Bahattin Şimşek, Alper Çetin

December 29, 2019 17	Çaykur Rizespor	1 - 2	Fenerbahçe	Rize
19.00	Mohamed Abarhoun 18'; Oğulcan Çağlayan (yellow card) 24'; Amedej Vetrih (yellow card) 56'; Montassar Talbi (yellow card) 58'	Report	13' Deniz Türüç; (yellow card) 24' Luiz Gustavo; (yellow card) 50' Ozan Tufan; 70' Jailson Siqueira	Stadium: Yeni Rize Şehir Stadium; Attendance: 10.553; Referee: Halil Umut Meler; Assistant referees: Mustafa Emre Eyisoy, İlker Takpak; Fourth official: Kadir Sağlam; Fifth official: Serkan Tokat, Kerem Ersoy

January 20, 2020 18	Çaykur Rizespor	2 - 0	Gençlerbirliği	Rize
20.00	Milan Škoda 70', 85'; Ismaël Diomandé (yellow card) 35'	Report	(yellow card) 27' Giovanni Sio	Stadium: Yeni Rize Şehir Stadium; Attendance: 3.257; Referee: Arda Kardeşler; Assistant referees: Ceyhun Sesigüzel, Candaş Elbil; Fourth official: Yakup Özhan; Fifth official: Volkan Bayarslan, Adem Cinek

January 27, 2020 19	Sivasspor	1 - 1	Çaykur Rizespor	Sivas
20.00	Mert Hakan Yandaş (yellow card) 66'; Yasin Öztekin 90+3'	Report	(yellow card) 26' Milan Škoda; (yellow card) 33' Montassar Talbi; (yellow card) 55' Fernando Boldrin; 60' Denys Harmash; (yellow card) 85'Amedej Vetrih; (yellow card) 87' Gökhan Akkan	Stadium: New Sivas 4 Eylül Stadium; Attendance: 11.063; Referee: Abdulkadir Bitigen; Assistant referees: İbrahim Çağlar Uyarcan, Ali Saygın Önel; Fourth official: Mustafa Aydın; Fifth official: Ümit Öztürk, Yiğit Arslan

February 1, 2020 20	Çaykur Rizespor	1 - 2	Beşiktaş	Rize
17.00	Milan Škoda 35'; Ismaël Diomandé (yellow card) 62'; Ivanildo Fernandes (yellow card) 72'; Zafer Görgen (yellow card) 71'	Report	28' Burak Yılmaz; 78' Gökhan Gönül	Stadium: Yeni Rize Şehir Stadium; Attendance: 8.192; Referee: Ümit Öztürk; Assistant referees: İsmail Şencan, Kamil Çetin; Fourth official: Caner Ak; Fifth official: Koray Gençerler, Kerem Ersoy

March 17, 2020 21	Göztepe	2 - 0	Çaykur Rizespor	İzmir
20.00	Berkan Emir 56'; Stefano Napoleoni 61' (yellow card) 66'	Report	(yellow card) 23' Fernando Boldrin; (yellow card) 66' Milan Škoda	Stadium: Gürsel Aksel Stadium; Attendance: 0 Referee: Mustafa Öğretmenoğlu; Assistant referees: Bilal Gölen, Osman Gökhan Bilir; Fourth official: Hüseyin Gökberk Arslan; Fifth official: Arda Kardeşler, Ceyhun Sesigüzel
Note: The match, which was postponed due to weather conditions on February 10th, was played on March 17th.

February 17, 2020 22	Gaziantep	2 - 0	Çaykur Rizespor	Gaziantep
20.00	Alexandru Maxim (yellow card) 18'; Kubilay Aktaş (yellow card) 39'; André Sousa 52'; Muhammet Demir (penalty missed) 56' (penalty missed) 61'; Papy Djilobodji 90+1'	Report	(yellow card) 33' Oğuz Kağan Güçtekin; (yellow card) 50' (yellow card) 56' (red card) Ivanildo Fernandes; (yellow card) 60' Montassar Talbi	Stadium: New Gaziantep Stadium; Attendance: 6.199; Referee: Ali Palabıyık; Assistant referees: Erdinç Sezertam, Serkan Olguncan; Fourth official: Mert Güzenge; Fifth official: Halil Umut Meler, Oğuzhan Uğurlu

February 24, 2020 23	Çaykur Rizespor	1 - 2	İstanbul Başakşehir	Rize
20.00	Aminu Umar 60'	Report	43' (pen.) Edin Višća; (yellow card) 63' Danijel Aleksić; 90+1' Martin Škrtel	Stadium: Yeni Rize Şehir Stadium; Attendance: 5.798; Referee: Cüneyt Çakır; Assistant referees: Bahattin Duran, Tarık Ongun; Fourth official: Oğuzhan Uğurlu; Fifth official: Özgüç Türkalp, Serkan Ok

February 29, 2020 24	Trabzonspor	5 - 2	Çaykur Rizespor	Trabzon
17.00	Kamil Çörekçi (yellow card) 27'; Manuel da Costa 65'; Caleb Ekuban 71'; José Sosa 77' (pen.); John Obi Mikel (yellow card) 78' (yellow card) 90+5' (red card); Anthony Nwakaeme 86'; Badou Ndiaye 90+8'	Report	36' Dario Melnjak; (yellow card) 58' Aminu Umar; (yellow card) 69' Ismaël Diomandé; 90+6' (pen.) Milan Škoda	Stadium: Şenol Güneş Stadium; Attendance: 30.784; Referee: Abdulkadir Bitigen; Assistant referees: İsmail Şencan, Mustafa Cem Satman; Fourth official: Direnç Tonusluoğlu; Fifth official: Özgür Yankaya, Mustafa Emre Eyisoy

March 8, 2020 25	Çaykur Rizespor	1 - 1	Alanyaspor	Rize
16.00	Ismaël Diomandé (yellow card) 34'; Braian Samudio 61'	Report	35' Yacine Bammou; (yellow card) 48' Ceyhun Gülselam; (yellow card) 54' Salih Uçan; (yellow card) 90+1' Baiano	Stadium: Yeni Rize Şehir Stadium; Attendance: 7.085; Referee: Ali Şansalan; Assistant referees: Hakan Yemişken, Samet Çiçek; Fourth official: Bilal Köseoğlu; Fifth official: Yaşar Kemal Uğurlu, Oğuzhan Uğurlu

March 13, 2020 26	MKE Ankaragücü	2 - 1	Çaykur Rizespor	Ankara
20.00	Burak Albayrak 17' (o.g.); Konrad Michalak (yellow card) 20'; Gerson Rodrigues 22'; Ante Kulušić (yellow card) 57'	Report	45+1' Denys Harmash; (yellow card) 64' Ismaël Diomandé; (yellow card) 90+2' (yellow card) 90+4' (red card) Mykola Morozyuk	Stadium: Eryaman Stadium; Attendance: 0 Referee: Yaşar Kemal Uğurlu; Assistant referees: Erdinç Sezertam, Samet Çiçek; Fourth official: Cihan Aydın; Fifth official: Mustafa Öğretmenoğlu, Abdullah Buğra Taşkınsoy

June 14, 2020 27	Çaykur Rizespor	2 - 0	Galatasaray	Rize
21.00	Dario Melnjak (yellow card) 7'; Milan Škoda (penalty missed) 42' 42'; Tunay Torun 53'; Braian Samudio (yellow card) 59'; Amedej Vetrih (yellow card) 84'; Burak Albayrak (yellow card) 90+4'	Report	(yellow card) 61' Ryan Donk; (yellow card) 87' (yellow card) 89' (red card) Adem Büyük	Stadium: Yeni Rize Şehir Stadium; Attendance: 0 Referee: Yaşar Kemal Uğurlu; Assistant referees: Erdinç Sezertam, Serkan Çimen; Fourth official: Turgut Doman; Fifth official: Koray Gençerler, Emre Malok

June 22, 2020 28	Antalyaspor	3 - 1	Çaykur Rizespor	Antalya
21.00	Sinan Gümüş 3' (yellow card) 51'; Adis Jahović 74' (pen.); Ersan Gülüm 76' (yellow card) 90+8'	Report	(yellow card) 47' Mykola Morozyuk; (yellow card) 75' Tarık Çetin; 90+8' (pen.) Milan Škoda	Stadium: New Antalya Stadium; Attendance: 0 Referee: Suat Arslanboğa; Assistant referees: Ali Saygın Ögel, Asım Yusuf Öz; Fourth official: Hakan Ceylan; Fifth official: Ali Şansalan, Burak Pakkan

June 28, 2020 29	Çaykur Rizespor	2 - 2	Denizlispor	Rize
18.30	Mykola Morozyuk (yellow card) 16'; Milan Škoda 40'; Tunay Torun (yellow card) 67'; Fernando Boldrin 71'	Report	(yellow card) 4' Özgür Çek; 20' Óscar Estupiñán; 30' (o.g.) Ivanildo Fernandes	Stadium: Yeni Rize Şehir Stadium; Attendance: 0 Referee: Cüneyt Çakır; Assistant referees: Bahattin Duran, Tarık Ongun; Fourth official: Mert Güzenge; Fifth official: Özgür Yankaya, Adem Cinek

July 5, 2020 30	Konyaspor	1 - 0	Çaykur Rizespor	Konya
21.00	Jens Jønsson (yellow card) 36'; Marin Aničić (yellow card) 83'; Farouk Miya 90+5' (pen.)	Report	(yellow card) 46' Montassar Talbi; (yellow card) 74' Fernando Boldrin	Stadium: Büyükşehir Belediye Stadyumu; Attendance: 0 Referee: Fırat Aydınus; Assistant referees: Aleks Taşcıoğlu, Erdem Bayık; Fourth official: Emre Malok; Fifth official: Bahattin Şimşek, Çağdaş Altay

July 9, 2020 31	Çaykur Rizespor	3 - 2	Kayserispor	Rize
18.30	Braian Samudio 11'; Orhan Ovacıklı (yellow card) 30'; Amedej Vetrih (yellow card) 43'; Denys Harmash 90+2'; Ivanildo Fernandes 90+4'	Report	32' Diego Ângelo; (yellow card) 53' (yellow card) 75' (red card) Gustavo Campanharo; (yellow card) 83' Hasan Hüseyin Acar; 87' (pen.) Artem Kravets	Stadium: Yeni Rize Şehir Stadium; Attendance: 0 Referee: Ali Palabıyık; Assistant referees: Serkan Olguncan, Mehmet Cem Satman; Fourth official: Alper Çetin; Fifth official: Cüneyt Çakır, Hakan Ceylan

July 13, 2020 32	Kasımpaşa	2 - 0	Çaykur Rizespor	Istanbul
18.30	Aytaç Kara (yellow card) 48'; Haris Hajradinović 53'; Anıl Koç 78'; Mame Baba Thiam (penalty missed) 90'	Report	(yellow card) 10' Burak Albayrak; (yellow card) 61' Ismaël Diomandé	Stadium: Recep Tayyip Erdoğan Stadium; Attendance: 0 Referee: Arda Kardeşler; Assistant referees: Alpaslan Ddedeş, İsmail Şencan; Fourth official: Murat Erdoğan; Fifth official: Serkan Tokat, Özgüç Türkalp

July 19, 2020 33	Çaykur Rizespor	3 - 0	Yeni Malatyaspor	Rize
21.00		Report		Stadium: Yeni Rize Şehir Stadium; Attendance: 0 Referee: Yaşar Kemal Uğurlu; Assistant referees: Erdinç Sezertam, Serkan Çimen; Fourth official: Sarper Barış Saka

July 2020 34	Fenerbahçe	3 - 1	Çaykur Rizespor	Istanbul
		Report		Stadium: Şükrü Saracoğlu Stadyumu
