= 2024–25 Bodrum FK season =

Bodrum FK
2024–25 season
- Manager: Volkan Demirel (until 3 February); José Morais (from 8 February)
- Stadium: Bodrum District Stadium
- Süper Lig: 16th
- Turkish Cup: Quarter-finals
- Top goalscorer: League: George Pușcaș (8); All: George Pușcaș (11)
- Biggest win: Kastamonuspor 1–6 Bodrum
- Biggest defeat: Samsunspor 4–0 Bodrum

The 2025 season is the 93rd in the history of Bodrum FK and their first-ever campaign in the top tier of Turkish football. The club will compete in the Süper Lig and the Turkish Cup.

== Transfers ==
=== In ===
Pos.	Player	Transferred from	Fee	Date	Source
MF	(Nigeria) Gabriel Obekpa	(Serbia) FK Mladost Lučani	Loan	4 August 2024	
FW	(Romania) George Pușcaș	(Italy) Genoa	Undisclosed	14 August 2024	
FW	(Albania) Taulant Seferi	(Ukraine) Vorskla Poltava	Undisclosed	30 August 2024	
MF	(Turkey) Taylan Antalyalı	(Turkey) Galatasaray	Loan	7 September 2024	
DF	(Albania) Arlind Ajeti	(Romania) CFR Cluj	€300,000	10 September 2024	
GK	(Turkey) Gökhan Akkan	(Turkey) Çaykur Rizespor	Undisclosed	12 September 2024	
FW	(Democratic Republic of the Congo) Jonathan Okita	(Switzerland) FC Zürich	Undisclosed	13 January 2025	
MF	(North Macedonia) Enis Bardhi	(Turkey) Trabzonspor	Free	23 January 2025	

=== Out ===
Pos.	Player	Transferred to	Fee	Date	Source
FW	(Turkey) Eray Akar	(Turkey) Aliağa	Loan	6 February 2025	
MF	(Nigeria) Gabriel Obekpa	(Moldova) FC Zimbru Chișinău	Loan	8 February 2025	

== Competitions ==
=== Süper Lig ===
==== League table ====
Pos	Team	Pld	W	D	L	GF	GA	GD	Pts	Qualification or relegation
14	Kayserispor	36	11	12	13	45	57	−12	45	
15	Antalyaspor	36	12	8	16	37	62	−25	44	
16	Bodrum (R)	36	9	10	17	26	43	−17	37	Relegation to 2025–26 TFF First League
17	Sivasspor (R)	36	9	8	19	44	60	−16	35	Relegation to 2025–26 TFF First League
18	Hatayspor (R)	36	6	8	22	47	74	−27	26	Relegation to 2025–26 TFF First League

Source: Süper Lig
Rules for classification: 1) Points; 2) Head-to-head points; 3) Head-to-head goal difference; 4) Head-to-head goals scored; 5) Goal difference; 6) Goals scored; 7) Play-off.
(Note: Head-to-head record is used only after all the matches between the teams in question have been played)
(R) Relegated

==== Results by round ====
Round	1	2	3	4	5	6	7	8	9	10	11	12	13	14	15	16	17	18	19	20	21	22	23	24	25	26	27	28	29	30
Ground	H	A	H	A	H	A	H	A	H	A	H	A	H	A		H	A	H	A	A	H	A	H	A	H	A	H	A	H	A
Result	L	L	W	L	L	W	W	D	L	L	D	L	L	L	B	W	L	D	L	D	L	L	D	W	W	D	W	W	L	
Position	18	19	12	15	17	13	8	9	12	13	13	16	17	17	17	17	17	16	17	16	16	17	17	17	17	15	16	15	16	

A = Away; H = Home; W = Win; D = Draw; L = Loss

==== Matches ====
12 August 2024 1	Bodrum	0–1	Gaziantep

19 August 2024 2	Eyüpspor	4–1	Bodrum

24 August 2024 3	Bodrum	3–1	Konyaspor

31 August 2024 4	Göztepe	2–0	Bodrum

14 September 2024 5	Bodrum	0–1	İstanbul Başakşehir

20 September 2024 6	Hatayspor	0–1	Bodrum

29 September 2024 7	Bodrum	3–1	Adana Demirspor

5 October 2024 8	Kasımpaşa	0–0	Bodrum

21 October 2024 9	Bodrum	0–1	Çaykur Rizespor

27 October 2024 10	Fenerbahçe	2–0	Bodrum

3 November 2024 11	Bodrum	0–0	Alanyaspor

9 November 2024 12	Antalyaspor	3–2	Bodrum

23 November 2024 13	Bodrum	0–1	Galatasaray

30 November 2024 14	Samsunspor	4–0	Bodrum

15	Bye

13 December 2024 16	Bodrum	2–0	Sivasspor

22 December 2024 17	Trazbonspor	1–0	Bodrum

5 January 2025 18	Bodrum	1–1	Kayserispor

11 January 2025 19	Beşiktaş	2–1	Bodrum

18 January 2025 20	Gaziantep	0–0	Bodrum

10 February 2025 23	Bodrum	0–0	Göztepe

15 February 2025 24	İstanbul Başakşehir	0–1	Bodrum

21 February 2025 25	Bodrum	1–0	Hatayspor

1 March 2025 26	Adana Demirspor	0–0	Bodrum

7 March 2025 27	Bodrum	1–0	Kasımpaşa

16 March 2025 28	Çaykur Rizespor	0–2	Bodrum

28 March 2025 29	Bodrum	2–4	Fenerbahçe

6 April 2025 30	Alanyaspor	0–1	Bodrum
13:30 UTC+3

12 April 2025 31	Bodrum	v	Antalyaspor
20:00 UTC+3

=== Turkish Cup ===
18 December 2024 Fourth round	Kastamonuspor	1–6	Bodrum

8 January 2025 1	Kırklarelispor	4–4	Bodrum

5 February 2025 2	Bodrum	3–1	Antalyaspor

25 February 2025 3	Sivasspor	0–1	Bodrum

2 April 2025 Quarter-finals	Trabzonspor	3–2 (a.e.t.)	Bodrum	Trabzon
17:45				Stadium: Papara Park
