= Ivanildo Fernandes =

Cape Verdean footballer (born 1996)

Personal information
- Full name: Ivanildo Jorge Mendes Fernandes
- Date of birth: 26 March 1996 (age 30)
- Place of birth: Amadora, Portugal
- Height: 1.93 m (6 ft 4 in)
- Position: Centre-back

Team information
- Current team: Nacional
- Number: 14

Youth career
- 2007–2008: Damaiense
- 2008–2011: Estrela Amadora
- 2011–2014: Casa Pia
- 2014–2015: Sporting CP

Senior career*
Years	Team	Apps	(Gls)
2015–2021	Sporting CP B	83	(2)
2018–2019	→ Moreirense (loan)	24	(1)
2019–2020	→ Trabzonspor (loan)	3	(0)
2020	→ Çaykur Rizespor (loan)	11	(1)
2021	→ Almería (loan)	14	(0)
2021–2023	Vizela	37	(0)
2023–2024	Kalba	2	(0)
2025–	Nacional	0	(0)

International career
2014–2015	Portugal U19	5	(0)
2016	Portugal U20	3	(0)
2018	Portugal U21	1	(0)
2023	Cape Verde	2	(0)
- * Club domestic league appearances and goals as of 20:43, 18 September 2023 (UTC)

Ivanildo Jorge Mendes Fernandes (born 26 March 1996) is a professional footballer who plays as a central defender for Primeira Liga club Nacional.

Born in Portugal, he played for the Cape Verde national team.

== Club career ==
Born in Amadora, Lisbon metropolitan area of Cape Verdean descent, Fernandes joined Sporting CP's academy at the age of 18. He spent his first three seasons as senior with the reserves in the Segunda Liga, his maiden appearance in the competition taking place on 20 September 2015 in a 2–1 away win against S.C. Freamunde where he played the 90 minutes.

Fernandes scored his first league goal on 24 August 2016, in a 1–1 away draw with F.C. Famalicão. He finished the campaign with a further goal from 35 appearances, helping to a 14th-place finish. In November 2017, due to injuries to the defensive sector of the first team, he was called for a Taça de Portugal match against Famalicão, but remained unused in the 2–0 victory.

On 27 July 2018, Fernandes was loaned to Moreirense FC. He made his debut in the Primeira Liga on 19 August, playing the entire 2–1 win at C.D. Nacional.

On 31 December 2020, after serving subsequent loans at Turkish clubs Trabzonspor and Çaykur Rizespor, Fernandes joined Spanish Segunda División side UD Almería on loan for the remainder of the season. In the ensuing summer, he signed a permanent three-year contract with F.C. Vizela who had just been promoted to the Portuguese top division.

Fernandes agreed to a deal at newly promoted UAE Pro League side Kalba FC on 5 August 2023. He returned to Portugal in January 2025, on a two-and-a-half-year contract at top-tier Nacional.

== International career ==
=== Portugal ===
Fernandes won his only cap for the Portugal under-21 side on 11 October 2018, in a 9–0 demolition of Liechtenstein for the 2019 UEFA European Championship qualifiers at the Rheinpark Stadion.

=== Cape Verde ===
After switching his allegiance in March 2023, Fernandes debuted with the senior Cape Verde national team later that month in a 1–0 away win over Eswatini in the 2023 Africa Cup of Nations qualification campaign.

== Career statistics ==
As of match played on 11 March 2023

Club statistics
Club	Season	League			Cup		League Cup		Other		Total	
Club	Season	Division	Apps	Goals	Apps	Goals	Apps	Goals	Apps	Goals	Apps	Goals
Sporting CP B	2016–17	LigaPro	16	0	0	0	0	0	0	0	16	0
Sporting CP B	2016–17	LigaPro	35	2	0	0	0	0	0	0	35	2
Sporting CP B	2017–18	LigaPro	32	0	0	0	0	0	0	0	32	0
Sporting CP B	2018–19	LigaPro	0	0	0	0	0	0	0	0	0	0
Sporting CP B	2019–20	LigaPro	0	0	0	0	0	0	0	0	0	0
Sporting CP B	2020–21	LigaPro	0	0	0	0	0	0	0	0	0	0
Sporting CP B	Total		83	2	0	0	0	0	0	0	83	2
Moreirense (loan)	2018–19	Primeira Liga	24	1	2	0	0	0	0	0	26	1
Trabzonspor (loan)	2019–20	Süper Lig	3	0	3	1	0	0	5 (Note: Appearances in UEFA Europa League)	0	11	1
Çaykur Rizespor (loan)	2019–20	Süper Lig	11	1	1	0	0	0	0	0	12	1
Almería (loan)	2020–21	Segunda División	14	0	2	0	0	0	1 (Note: Appearance in La Liga play-offs)	0	17	0
Vizela	2020–21	Liga Portugal 2	17	0	2	0	0	0	0	0	19	0
Vizela	2021–22	Primeira Liga	14	0	1	0	2	0	0	0	17	0
Vizela	Total		31	0	3	0	2	0	0	0	36	0
Career totals			166	4	11	1	2	0	6	0	185	5

== Honours ==
Trabzonspor

- Turkish Cup: 2019–20
