= Doğan Erdoğan =

Turkish footballer (born 1996)

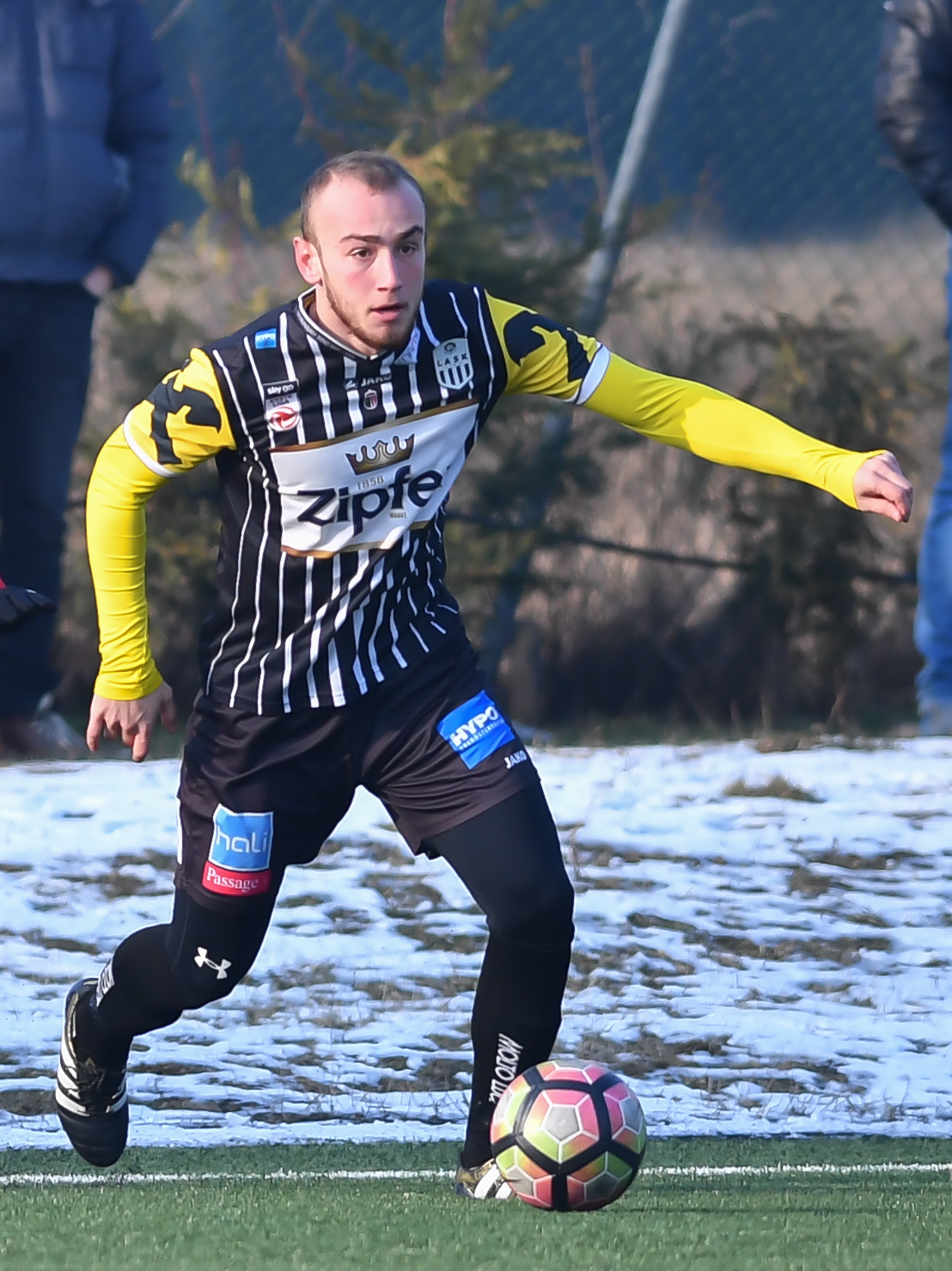
- Erdogan in 2017

Personal information
- Date of birth: 22 August 1996 (age 30)
- Place of birth: Samsun, Turkey
- Height: 1.82 m (6 ft 0 in)
- Position: Midfielder

Team information
- Current team: Iğdır
- Number: 21

Youth career
- 2006–2012: Samsunspor

Senior career*
Years	Team	Apps	(Gls)
2012–2015	Samsunspor	25	(0)
2015–2019	LASK	64	(3)
2019	→ Juniors OÖ (loan)	14	(1)
2019–2020	Trabzonspor	20	(0)
2020–2021	Çaykur Rizespor	19	(1)
2021–2022	Gaziantep	31	(0)
2022–2023	Fortuna Sittard	27	(0)
2023–2025	Göztepe	31	(1)
2025–	Iğdır	31	(0)

International career
2010	Turkey U15	1	(0)
2013–2014	Turkey U18	13	(0)
2013–2015	Turkey U19	15	(0)
2016–2017	Turkey U21	7	(0)
- * Club domestic league appearances and goals as of 6 May 2026

Doğan Erdoğan (born 22 August 1996) is a Turkish professional footballer who plays as a midfielder for TFF 1. Lig club Iğdır.

== Career ==
=== Samsunspor ===
Erdoğan progressed through the Samsunspor youth academy, and made his professional debut in the TFF First League on 24 November 2012, replacing Hakan Arslan in the 79th minute of a 1–1 away draw against MKE Ankaragücü at Ankara 19 Mayıs Stadium.

=== LASK ===
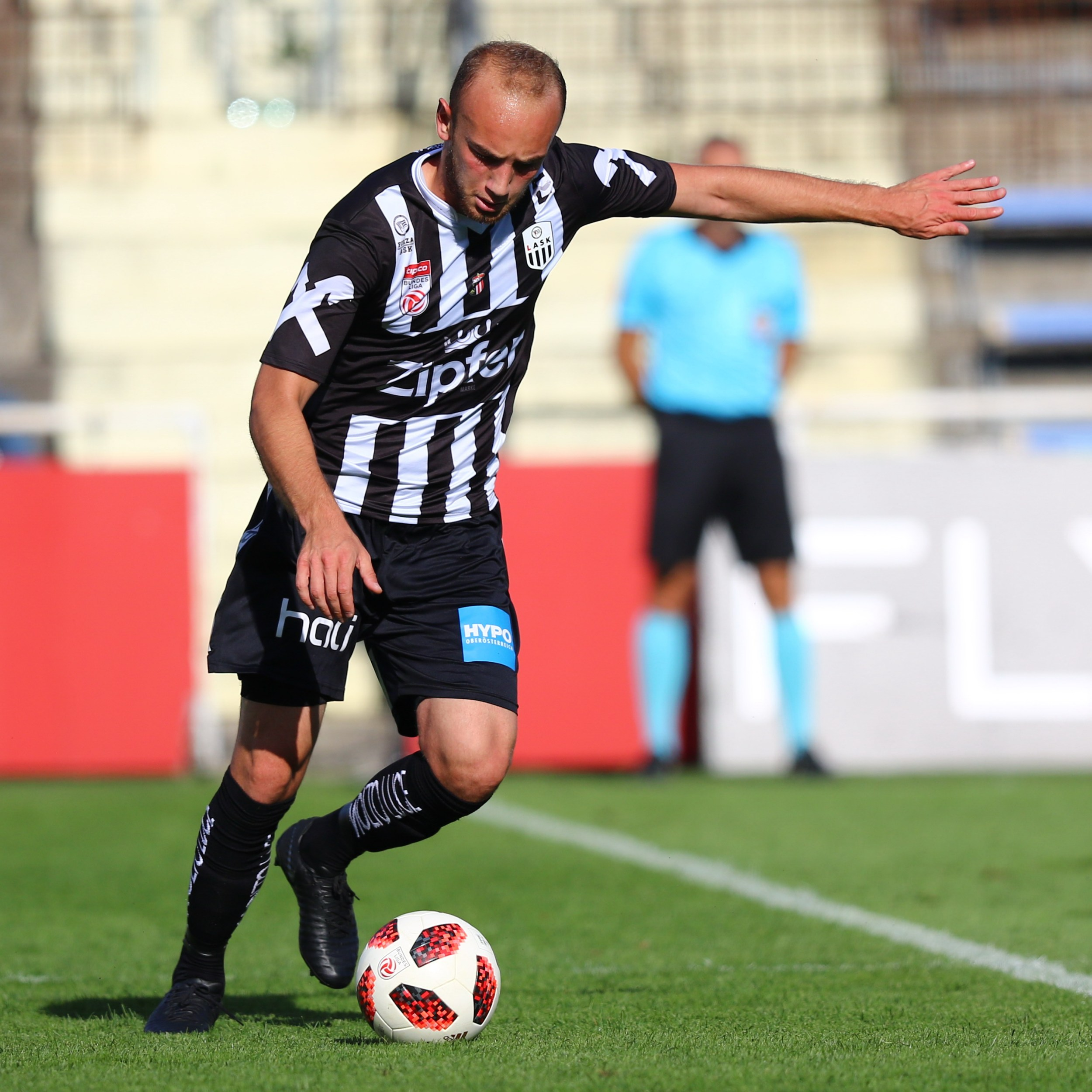
Erdoğan with LASK in 2018

In July 2015, Erdoğan joined Austrian second division club LASK, where he signed a two-year contract. He made his debut for this club on 24 July 2015, as a starter in the league match against Floridsdorfer AC. On 18 March 2016, Erdoğan scored his first professional goal on in a 2–1 league victory over Austria Salzburg. He played a key role in helping LASK to promote to the Austrian Bundesliga in 2017.

In the first season after promotion, LASK finished fourth, qualifying for the UEFA Europa League qualifying round. Erdogan missed most of the matches of the campaign due to injury. He made his European debut on 9 August 2018, replacing Peter Michorl in a game against Beşiktaş. In the 2018–19 season, Erdoğan played a limited role under head coach Oliver Glasner, and in November 2018, he was suspended by LASK due to disciplinary reasons. He subsequently returned to Turkey to stay fit and was eventually loaned to the second division team Juniors OÖ in February 2019 for the remainder of the season. Although Juniors OÖ serves as a syndicate for LASK, Erdoğan was ineligible to be registered as a cooperation player due to his age and therefore only qualified to play for Juniors OÖ. He made 14 league appearances for Juniors OÖ, in which he scored once in a league game against SV Horn.

=== Return to Turkey ===
On 28 June 2019, Erdoğan returned to Turkey where he joined Süper Lig club Trabzonspor on a three-year deal with an option for a further year. He made his debut for the team as a substitute in a UEFA Europa League qualification match against Sparta Prague on 8 August 2019, replacing Caleb Ekuban in the 90th minute of a 2–2 away draw. Ten days later, he made his league debut in the season opener against Kasımpaşa, coming on as a 89th minute substitute for Abdülkadir Ömür in a 1–1 away draw.

In September 2020, Erdoğan signed a three-year contract with Çaykur Rizespor on a free transfer. He made his debut for the club in a league match against Alanyaspor on 27 September 2020, and scored his first and only goal for the club in a match against Kasımpaşa on 2 February 2021.

After a brief period without a club, Erdoğan signed a three-year contract with Gaziantep on 21 June 2021. He made his debut for the club on 14 August 2021, replacing Furkan Soyalp in the 80th minute of a 3–2 away loss to Fatih Karagümrük in Süper Lig.

=== Fortuna Sittard ===
On 7 July 2022, Erdoğan signed a three-year contract with Eredivisie club Fortuna Sittard. He made his competitive debut for the club on the first matchday of the season, on 6 August 2022, starting the match in defensive midfield before being replaced by Iñigo Córdoba in the 66th minute of a 3–2 home loss to Ajax.

His contract with Fortuna was terminated by mutual consent in June 2023.

=== Göztepe ===
On 14 September 2023, Erdoğan signed a one-year contract with an option for an additional year with TFF First League club Göztepe. The option in his contract was triggered on 1 June 2024, following the club's promotion to the Süper Lig, extending Erdoğan's stay at the club until 2025.

== Career statistics ==
As of match played 24 December 2023

Appearances and goals by club, season and competition
Club	Season	League			National cup (Note: Includes Turkish Cup, Austrian Cup and KNVB Cup)		Europe		Total	
Club	Season	Division	Apps	Goals	Apps	Goals	Apps	Goals	Apps	Goals
Samsunspor	2012–13	TFF First League	4	0	0	0	—		4	0
Samsunspor	2013–14	TFF First League	3	0	1	0	—		4	0
Samsunspor	2014–15	TFF First League	18	0	1	0	—		19	0
Samsunspor	Total		25	0	2	0	—		27	0
LASK	2015–16	Erste Liga	22	1	2	0	—		24	1
LASK	2016–17	Erste Liga	26	1	4	0	—		30	1
LASK	2017–18	Austrian Bundesliga	13	1	2	0	—		15	1
LASK	2018–19	Austrian Bundesliga	3	0	1	0	1 (Note: Appearances in UEFA Europa League)	0	5	0
LASK	Total		64	3	9	0	1	0	74	3
FC Juniors OÖ (loan)	2018–19	2. Liga (Note: The Austrian second-tier Erste Liga was renamed 2. Liga in 2018.)	14	1	—		—		14	1
Trabzonspor	2019–20	Süper Lig	20	0	6	0	10	0	36	1
Çaykur Rizespor	2020–21	Süper Lig	19	1	2	0	—		21	1
Gaziantep	2021–22	Süper Lig	31	0	4	0	—		35	0
Fortuna Sittard	2022–23	Eredivisie	27	0	0	0	—		27	0
Göztepe	2023–24	TFF First League	7	0	1	0	—		8	0
Career total			207	5	24	0	11	0	242	5

== Honours ==
Trabzonspor

- Turkish Cup: 2019–20
