= Tarık Çetin =

Turkish footballer

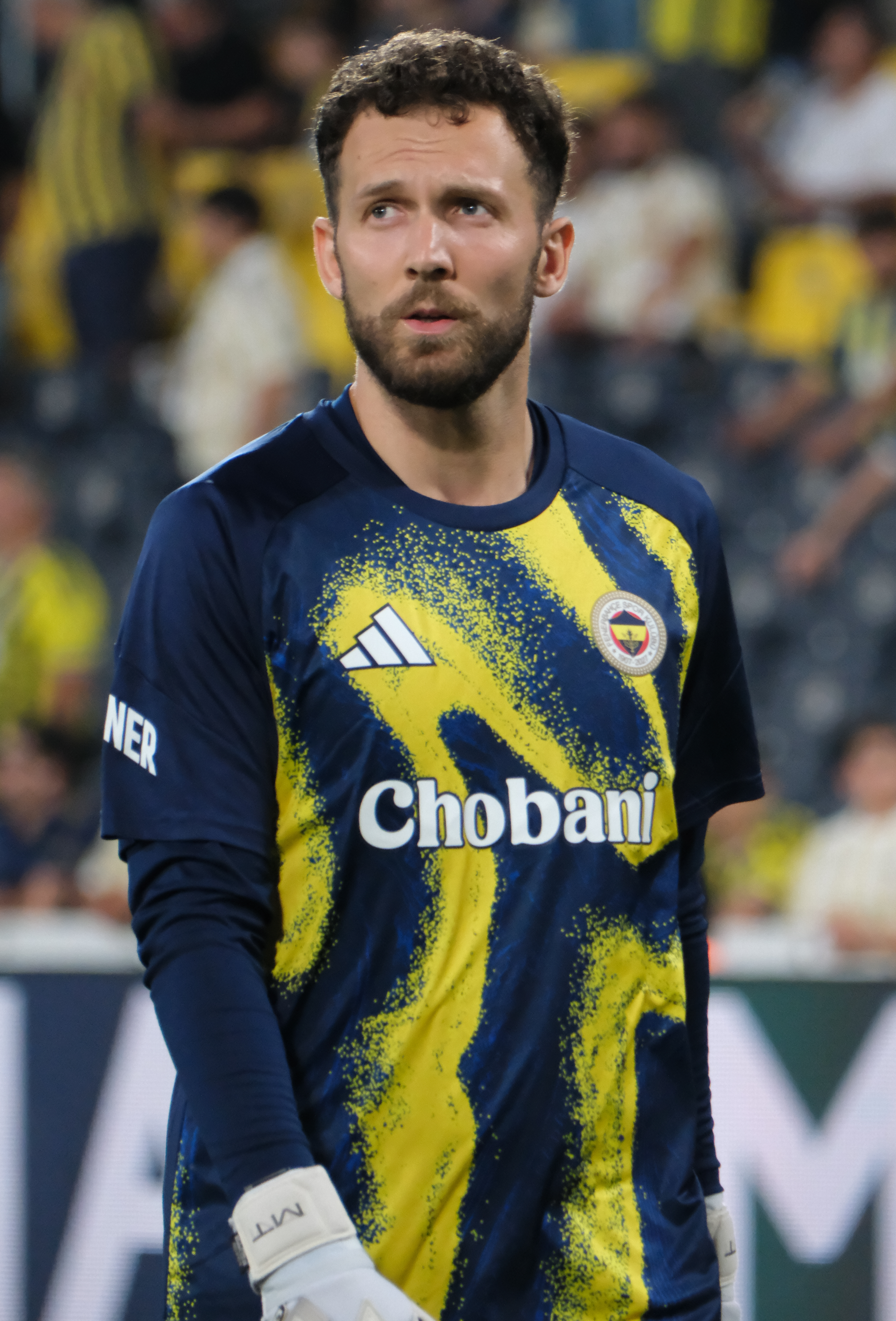

Personal information
- Full name: Tarık Çetin
- Date of birth: 8 January 1997 (age 29)
- Place of birth: Kadıköy, Turkey
- Height: 1.93 m (6 ft 4 in)
- Position: Goalkeeper

Team information
- Current team: Fenerbahçe
- Number: 13

Youth career
- 2008–2009: Derincespor
- 2009–2018: Fenerbahçe

Senior career*
Years	Team	Apps	(Gls)
2018–2019	Fenerbahçe	0	(0)
2018–2019	→ Fatih Karagümrük (loan)	44	(0)
2019–2025	Çaykur Rizespor	75	(0)
2025–	Fenerbahçe	3	(0)

International career^{‡}
2012–2013	Turkey U16	11	(0)
2013–2014	Turkey U18	11	(0)
2014	Turkey U19	2	(0)
- * Club domestic league appearances and goals as of 15 August 2026 ‡ National team caps and goals as of 10 May 2020

Tarık Çetin (born 8 January 1997) is a Turkish professional footballer who plays as a goalkeeper for the Turkish Süper Lig club Fenebahçe.

== Club career ==
=== Early career ===
He began his football career at Fenerbahçe Academy and signed his first professional contract with Fenebahçe in the 2018-2019 season, then loaned to Fatih Karagümrük.

=== Çaykur Rizespor (2019–2025) ===
On July 17, 2019, he was traded to Rizespor along with Burak Albayrak and Mahsun Çapkan in the transfer of Vedat Muriqi. On 24 July 2019, Çetin signed a professional contract with Çaykur Rizespor.

On 1 November 2019, he made his professional debut in the Süper Lig with Çaykur Rizespor in a 2–0 loss to Galatasaray.

In November 2022, he renewed his contract with Rizespor until the end of 2024–25 season.

=== Fenerbahçe (2025–present) ===
On July 13, 2025, he signed a one-year contract with Fenerbahçe, where he started to play football.

On 5 October 2025, he made his debut with Fenerbahçe as a starter, in Turkish Super Lig eighth week away match against Samsunspor, a clean sheet by 0-0.

On 26 February 2026, he made his continental debut in his career in a 2-1 UEFA Europa League away won against Nottingham Forest.

== International career ==
Çetin is a youth international for Turkey, having represented the U16s, U17s and U19s.

== Career statistics ==
As of match played 15 August 2026

Appearances and goals by club, season and competition
Club	Season	League			Turkish Cup		Continental		Other		Total	
Club	Season	Division	Apps	Goals	Apps	Goals	Apps	Goals	Apps	Goals	Apps	Goals
Fatih Karagümrük (loan)	2017–18	2. Lig	8	0	0	0	—		—		8	0
Fatih Karagümrük (loan)	2018–19	2. Lig	36	0	0	0	—		—		36	0
Fatih Karagümrük (loan)	Total		44	0	0	0	—		—		44	0
Çaykur Rizespor	2019–20	Süper Lig	9	0	4	0	—		—		13	0
Çaykur Rizespor	2020–21	Süper Lig	8	0	2	0	—		—		10	0
Çaykur Rizespor	2021–22	Süper Lig	11	0	1	0	—		—		12	0
Çaykur Rizespor	2022–23	1. Lig	27	0	0	0	—		—		27	0
Çaykur Rizespor	2023–24	Süper Lig	9	0	2	0	—		—		11	0
Çaykur Rizespor	2024–25	Süper Lig	11	0	4	0	—		—		15	0
Çaykur Rizespor	Total		75	0	13	0	—		—		88	0
Fenerbahçe	2025–26	Süper Lig	2	0	1	0	1 (Note: Appearance(s) in UEFA Europa League)	0	0	0	4	0
Fenerbahçe	2026–27	Süper Lig	1	0	0	0	0	0	0	0	1	0
Fenerbahçe	Total		3	0	1	0	1	0	0	0	5	0
Career total			122	0	14	0	1	0	0	0	137	0

== Honours ==
Fenerbahçe U21

- U21 Ligi: 2016–17
- U21 Super Cup: 2017

Fenerbahçe

- Turkish Super Cup: 2025
