= Kemal Rüzgar =

Turkish footballer

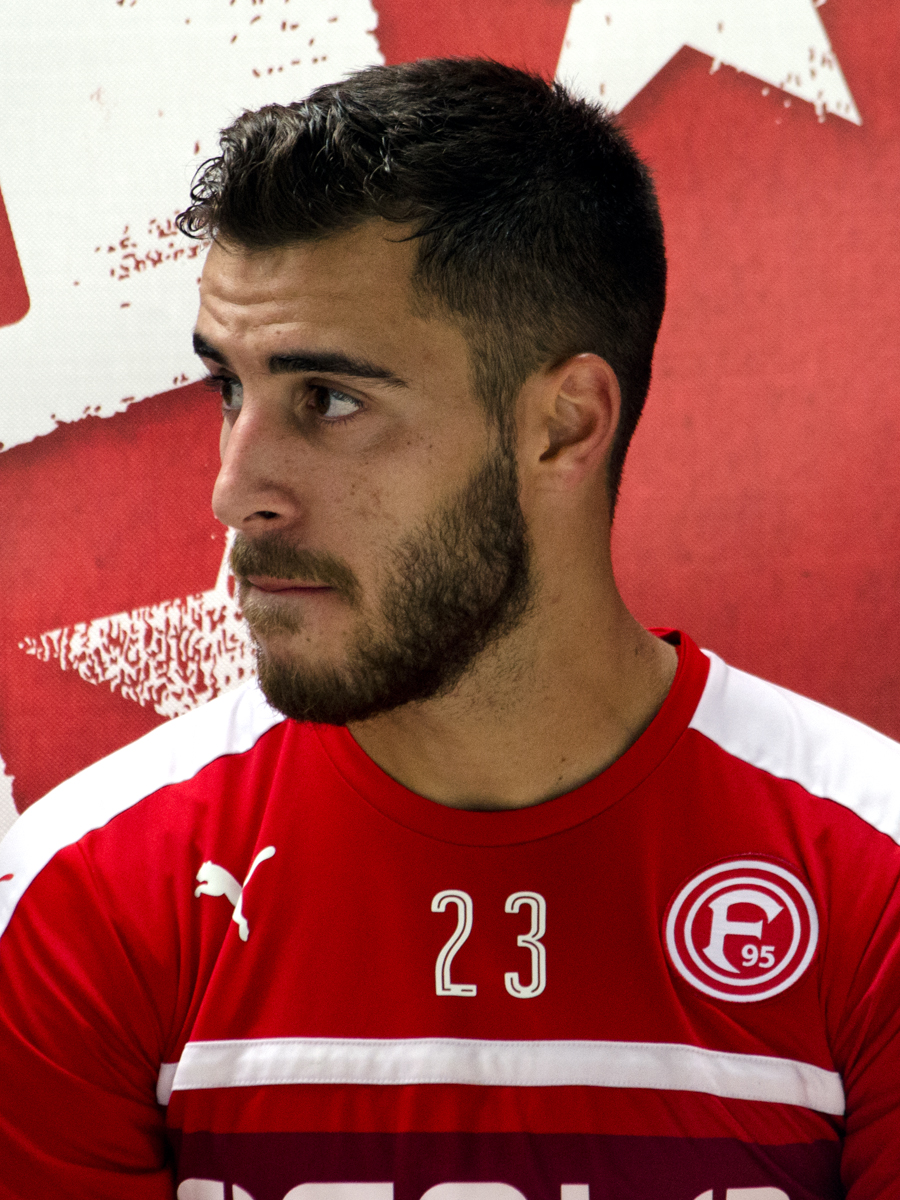
- Rüzgar with Fortuna Düsseldorf in 2016

Personal information
- Date of birth: 20 June 1995 (age 31)
- Place of birth: Dillenburg, Germany
- Height: 1.85 m (6 ft 1 in)
- Position: Forward

Team information
- Current team: Elazığspor
- Number: 9

Youth career
- –2012: Fortuna Düsseldorf
- 2013–2014: Bayer Leverkusen

Senior career*
Years	Team	Apps	(Gls)
2015–2016	Fortuna Düsseldorf II	56	(31)
2016–2018	Fortuna Düsseldorf	1	(0)
2017	→ VfL Osnabrück (loan)	9	(1)
2017–2018	→ FC Viktoria Köln (loan)	18	(4)
2018–2020	Altınordu	27	(9)
2020–2021	Çaykur Rizespor	8	(1)
2021–2022	Manisa FK	23	(1)
2022	Boluspor	8	(1)
2022–2023	Şanlıurfaspor	38	(23)
2023–2024	Menemen	36	(23)
2024–2025	Sarıyer	33	(19)
2025–2026	Kahramanmaraş İstiklalspor	34	(34)
2026-	Elazığspor	4	(6)

International career
2012–2013	Turkey U18	7	(2)
- * Club domestic league appearances and goals as of 1 October 2026

Kemal Rüzgar (born 20 June 1995) is a footballer who plays as a forward for TFF 2. Lig club Elazığspor. Born in Germany, he represented Turkey at under-18 international level.

== International career ==
Kemal Rüzgar is a youth international for Turkey at the U18 level.
