= Tunay Torun =

Turkish footballer (born 1990)

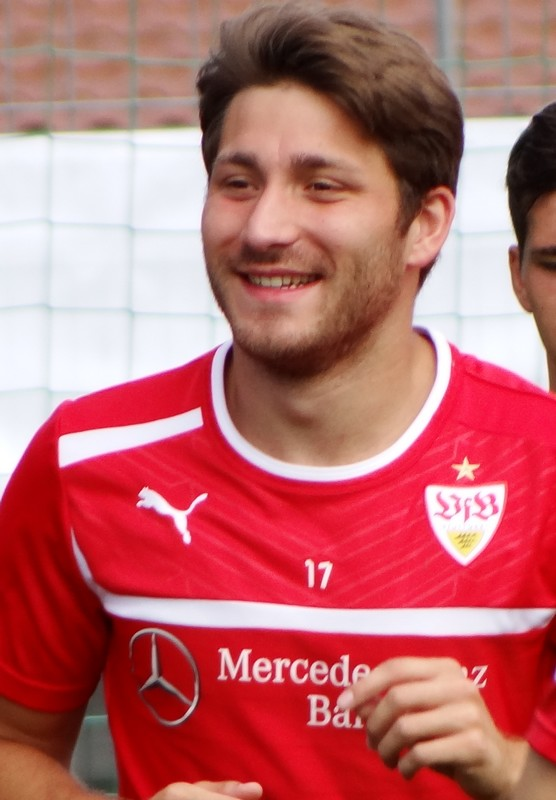
- Torun at practice with VfB Stuttgart in 2012.

Personal information
- Date of birth: 21 April 1990 (age 36)
- Place of birth: Hamburg, West Germany
- Height: 1.76 m (5 ft 9 in)
- Position: Winger

Youth career
- 1996–2006: FC St. Pauli
- 2006–2007: Hamburger SV

Senior career*
Years	Team	Apps	(Gls)
2007–2011	Hamburger SV II	47	(16)
2008–2011	Hamburger SV	27	(2)
2011–2012	Hertha BSC	20	(4)
2012–2013	VfB Stuttgart	9	(0)
2014–2017	Kasımpaşa	103	(13)
2017–2020	İstanbul Başakşehir	6	(0)
2018–2019	→ Bursaspor (loan)	25	(0)
2020–2021	Çaykur Rizespor	26	(3)
2021–2022	Fath Karagümrük	12	(0)
2022–2023	Kasımpaşa	18	(0)

International career
2005	Turkey U15	2	(0)
2007	Turkey U16	4	(1)
2006–2007	Turkey U17	14	(11)
2007–2008	Turkey U18	9	(3)
2008–2009	Turkey U19	13	(6)
2008–2011	Turkey U21	5	(0)
2014	Turkey U23	2	(3)
2011–2012	Turkey	9	(0)
- * Club domestic league appearances and goals

Tunay Torun (Turkish pronunciation: [tunaj toɾun], born 21 April 1990) is a Turkish former professional footballer who plays as a winger.

== Club career ==
At the age of 16 he moved from FC St. Pauli to the youth side of Hamburger SV. In November 2007, Torun signed a professional contract but was still kept with the youth team for the rest of the season. He made his Bundesliga debut on 23 August 2008, against Karlsruher SC assisting the game-winning goal. He first scored for HSV on 28 November 2009 in an away match against 1. FSV Mainz 05.

=== Hamburger SV ===
From 2007 to 2011, Torun played in the youth squads of Hamburger SV and made it into the first team in 2008. He scored his first Bundesliga goal against 1. FSV Mainz 05.

=== Hertha BSC ===
During the summer transfer season of 2011, Torun joined Hertha BSC. He scored his first goal for Hertha on 13 August 2011 against his former club Hamburger SV and the game ended in a 2–2 draw.

=== VfB Stuttgart ===
During 2012–13 season, Torun moved VfB Stuttgart on a free transfer and he signed a three-year deal. However, Torun did not get enough playing time playing a total of seven games including the German cup matches. He scored one goal and made one assist in a cup match for VfB Stuttgart.

=== Kasımpaşa ===
On 6 January 2014, Torun signed with Kasımpaşa S.K. for three-and-a-half years. Torun scored his first goal on 23 February 2014 against Sivasspor.

=== İstanbul Başakşehir ===
On 1 July 2017, Torun signed a three-year deal with İstanbul Başakşehir.

==== Bursaspor (loan) ====
For the 2018–19 Süper Lig season, he joined Bursaspor with a one-year loan deal.

== International career ==
Torun holds both Turkish and German citizenships. Despite invitations from the German youth team he chose to represent Turkey on international level. He was promoted from the Turkish U17 team to the Under-21s in August 2009. Torun made his debut for the Turkish senior side in a friendly against South Korea on 9 February 2011.
