= Braian Samudio =

Paraguayan footballer (born 1995)

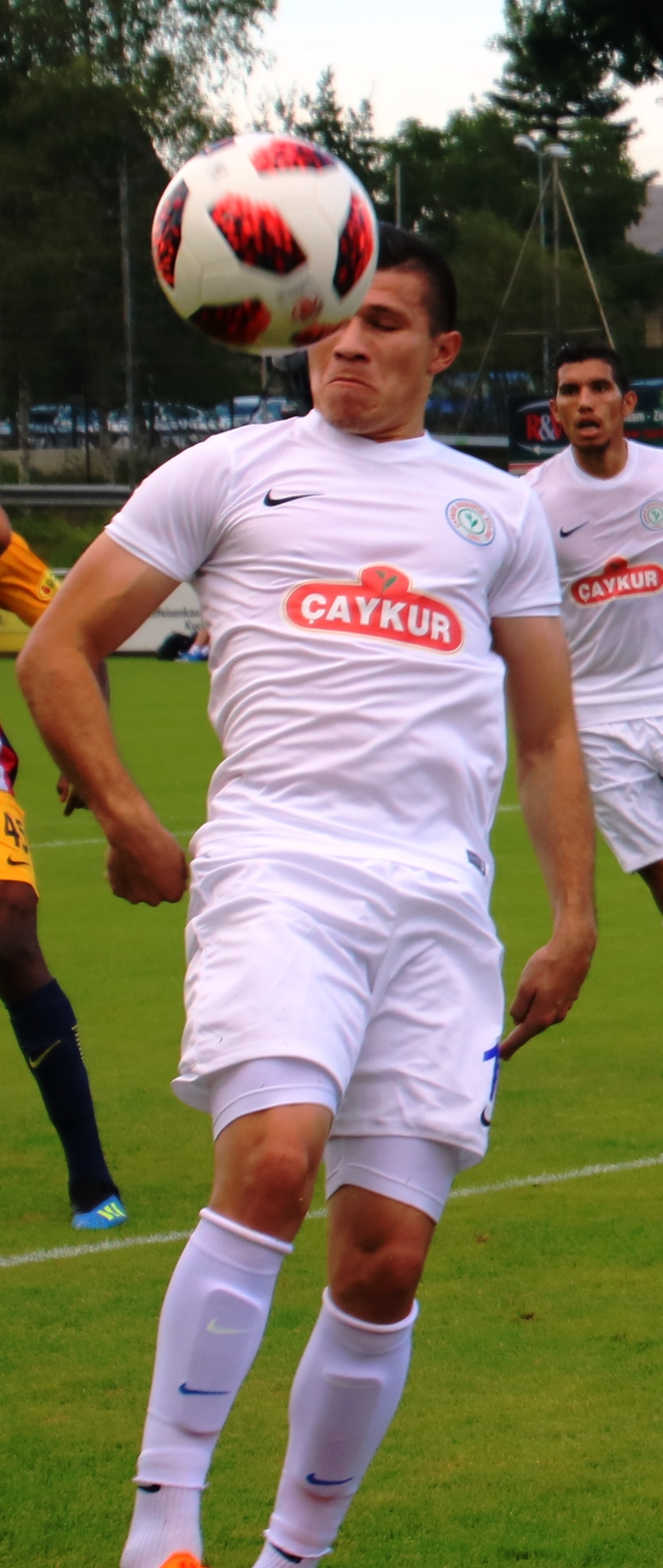

Personal information
- Full name: Braian Jose Samudio Segovia
- Date of birth: 23 December 1995 (age 30)
- Place of birth: Ciudad del Este, Paraguay
- Height: 1.80 m (5 ft 11 in)
- Position: Forward

Team information
- Current team: Esenler Erokspor
- Number: 18

Senior career*
Years	Team	Apps	(Gls)
2015–2016	União Barbarense	18	(4)
2016	Boa	12	(3)
2017–2018	Guarani	26	(7)
2017–2018	→ Çaykur Rizespor (loan)	33	(20)
2018–2021	Çaykur Rizespor	97	(18)
2021–2024	Toluca	27	(2)
2022–2023	→ Cerro Porteño (loan)	40	(10)
2023–2024	→ Necaxa (loan)	22	(4)
2024–2025	Antalyaspor	35	(7)
2025–2026	Çorum	37	(9)
2026–	Esenler Erokspor	8	(0)

International career^{‡}
2019–	Paraguay	15	(1)
- * Club domestic league appearances and goals as of 15 October 2026 ‡ National team caps and goals as of 05:40, 7 March 2024 (UTC+1)

Braian Jose Samudio Segovia (born 23 December 1995) is a Paraguayan professional footballer who plays as a forward for Turkish TFF 1. Lig club Esenler Erokspor and the Paraguay national team.

== Career ==
=== Guarani ===
Unveiled as a new signing for Brazilian Serie B competitors Guarani in 2017, Samudio settled well into the club, expressing that it was a very important achievement of him to be part of Guarani. Enjoying the impassionedness of his teams' supporters, the Paraguayan managed 7 goals in 26 league outings for the Bugre in 2017, which eventually earned him a move to Turkey.

==== Çaykur Rizespor (loan) ====
Passing the health test, Samudio officially transferred to Turkish side Çaykur Rizespor in 2017 on a loan deal, making an impact on the league and scoring 6 goals in his first 10 games, his first in a 3–1 victory over Adana Demirspor.

=== Cerro Porteño ===
In June 2022 Samudio signed for Cerro Porteño.

== Career statistics ==
=== Club ===
As of 1 October 2018.

Club	Division	Season	League		Cup		Continental		Total	
Club	Division	Season	Apps	Goals	Apps	Goals	Apps	Goals	Apps	Goals
Çaykur Rizespor	TFF First League	2017–18	33	20	1	0	0	0	34	20
Çaykur Rizespor	Süper Lig	2018–19	7	2	1	0	0	0	8	2
Career total			40	22	2	0	0	0	42	22

Assist Goals

Season	Team	Assists
2017–18	Çaykur Rizespor	6
2018–19	Çaykur Rizespor	3

=== International ===
List of international goals scored by Braian Samudio
No.	Date	Venue	Opponent	Score	Result	Competition
1.	24 June 2021	Estádio Nacional Mané Garrincha, Brasília, Brazil	Chile	1–0	2–0	2021 Copa América

== Honours ==
Boa Esporte

- Série C: 2016

Çaykur Rizespor

- TFF First League: 2017–18
