= Zafer Görgen =

Turkish footballer (born 2000)

Personal information
- Date of birth: 21 June 2000 (age 26)
- Place of birth: Muğla, Turkey
- Height: 1.88 m (6 ft 2 in)
- Position: Goalkeeper

Team information
- Current team: Çaykur Rizespor
- Number: 30

Youth career
- 2013–2014: Yeni Milasspor
- 2014–2018: Manisaspor

Senior career*
Years	Team	Apps	(Gls)
2018–2019	Manisaspor	20	(0)
2019–	Çaykur Rizespor	14	(0)
2024	→ Bandırmaspor (loan)	12	(0)
2024–2025	→ Bandırmaspor (loan)	22	(0)
2025–2026	→ Gaziantep (loan)	20	(0)
- * Club domestic league appearances and goals as of 16 October 2026

Zafer Görgen (born 21 June 2000) is a Turkish professional footballer who plays as a goalkeeper for Süper Lig club Çaykur Rizespor.

== Career ==
On 31 January 2019, Görgen signed a professional contract with Çaykur Rizespor for 4.5 years. On 9 November 2019, he made his professional debut with Çaykur Rizespor in a 1–0 Süper Lig win over Antalyaspor on 9 November 2019.

== Career statistics ==
As of match played 1 May 2026

Appearances and goals by club, season and competition
Club	Season	League			National cup		Europe		Other		Total	
Club	Season	Division	Apps	Goals	Apps	Goals	Apps	Goals	Apps	Goals	Apps	Goals
Manisaspor	2017–18	TFF 1. Lig	6	0	0	0	—		—		6	0
Manisaspor	2018–19	TFF 2. Lig	14	0	0	0	—		—		14	0
Manisaspor	Total		20	0	0	0	—		—		20	0
Çaykur Rizespor	2018–19	Süper Lig	0	0	0	0	—		—		0	0
Çaykur Rizespor	2019–20	Süper Lig	3	0	0	0	—		—		3	0
Çaykur Rizespor	2020–21	Süper Lig	2	0	1	0	—		—		3	0
Çaykur Rizespor	2021–22	Süper Lig	2	0	0	0	—		—		2	0
Çaykur Rizespor	2022–23	TFF 1. Lig	7	0	4	0	—		—		11	0
Çaykur Rizespor	2023–24	Süper Lig	0	0	1	0	—		—		1	0
Çaykur Rizespor	Total		14	0	6	0	—		—		20	0
Bandırmaspor (loan)	2023–24	TFF 1. Lig	12	0	0	0	—		—		12	0
Bandırmaspor (loan)	2024–25	TFF 1. Lig	22	0	0	0	—		0	0	20	0
Gaziantep (loan)	2025–26	Süper Lig	20	0	2	0	—		—		22	0
Career total			88	0	8	0	0	0	0	0	96	0
