= Burak Albayrak =

Turkish footballer

Personal information
- Date of birth: 12 January 1998 (age 28)
- Place of birth: Ümraniye, Turkey
- Height: 1.88 m (6 ft 2 in)
- Position: Defender

Team information
- Current team: Karacabey Belediyespor
- Number: 28

Youth career
- 2008–2009: Kurtköyspor
- 2009–2018: Fenerbahçe

Senior career*
Years	Team	Apps	(Gls)
2018–2019	Fenerbahçe	0	(0)
2019–2023	Çaykur Rizespor	7	(0)
2020–2021	→ Menemenspor (loan)	3	(0)
2021	→ Serik Belediyespor (loan)	14	(0)
2021–2022	→ Sarıyer (loan)	6	(0)
2022	→ Niğde Anadolu FK (loan)	15	(3)
2022	→ Esenler Erokspor (loan)	1	(0)
2022–2023	→ Kırklarelispor (loan)	23	(2)
2023–2024	Fethiyespor	13	(0)
2024–	Karacabey Belediyespor	27	(0)

International career^{‡}
2014	Turkey U16	4	(0)
- * Club domestic league appearances and goals as of 21 September 2025 ‡ National team caps and goals as of 10 May 2020

Burak Albayrak (born 12 January 1998) is a Turkish footballer who plays as a defender for TFF 2. Lig club Karacabey Belediyespor.

== Professional career ==
Albayrak made his professional debut with Çaykur Rizespor in a 1-1 Turkish Cup tie with Galatasaray on 15 January 2020.
