= Abdullah Durak =

Turkish professional footballer

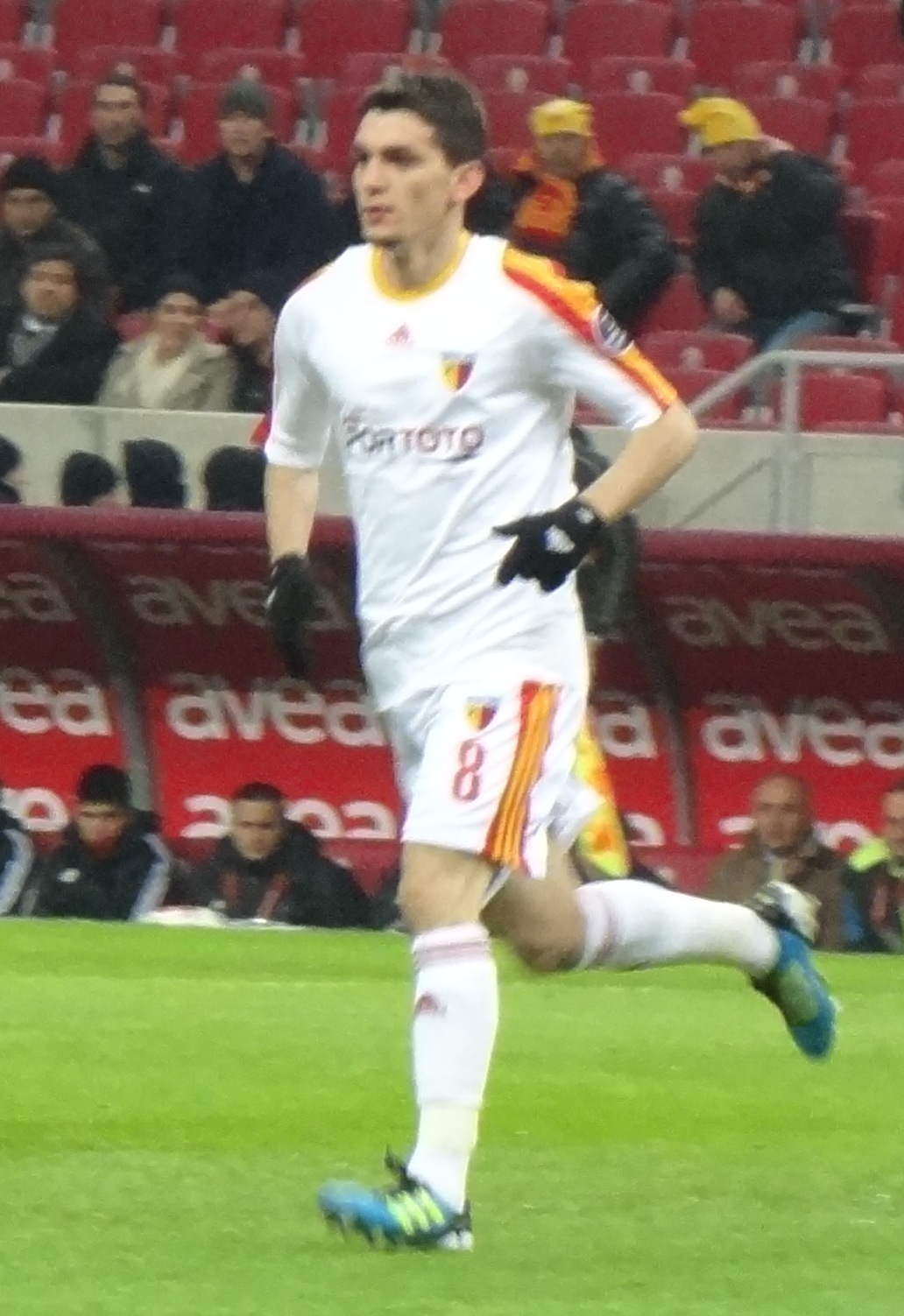

Personal information
- Date of birth: 1 April 1987 (age 39)
- Place of birth: Niğde, Turkey
- Height: 1.81 m (5 ft 11 in)
- Position: Central midfielder

Youth career
- 2002: Kemerhisar B.S.
- 2002–2005: Niğde B.S.
- 2005–2007: Kayserispor

Senior career*
Years	Team	Apps	(Gls)
2007–2015	Kayserispor	190	(5)
2008	→ Kastamonuspor (loan)	13	(2)
2015–2018	Kasımpaşa	50	(0)
2018–2021	Çaykur Rizespor	84	(0)
2021–2023	Ankaragücü	38	(0)
2023–2024	Gençlerbirliği	13	(2)

International career
2008	Turkey U21	5	(1)
2011	Turkey A2	2	(0)
- * Club domestic league appearances and goals as of 11 May 2024

Abdullah Durak (born 1 April 1987) is a Turkish professional footballer who plays as a central midfielder.
