= Gökhan Akkan =

Turkish footballer (born 1995)

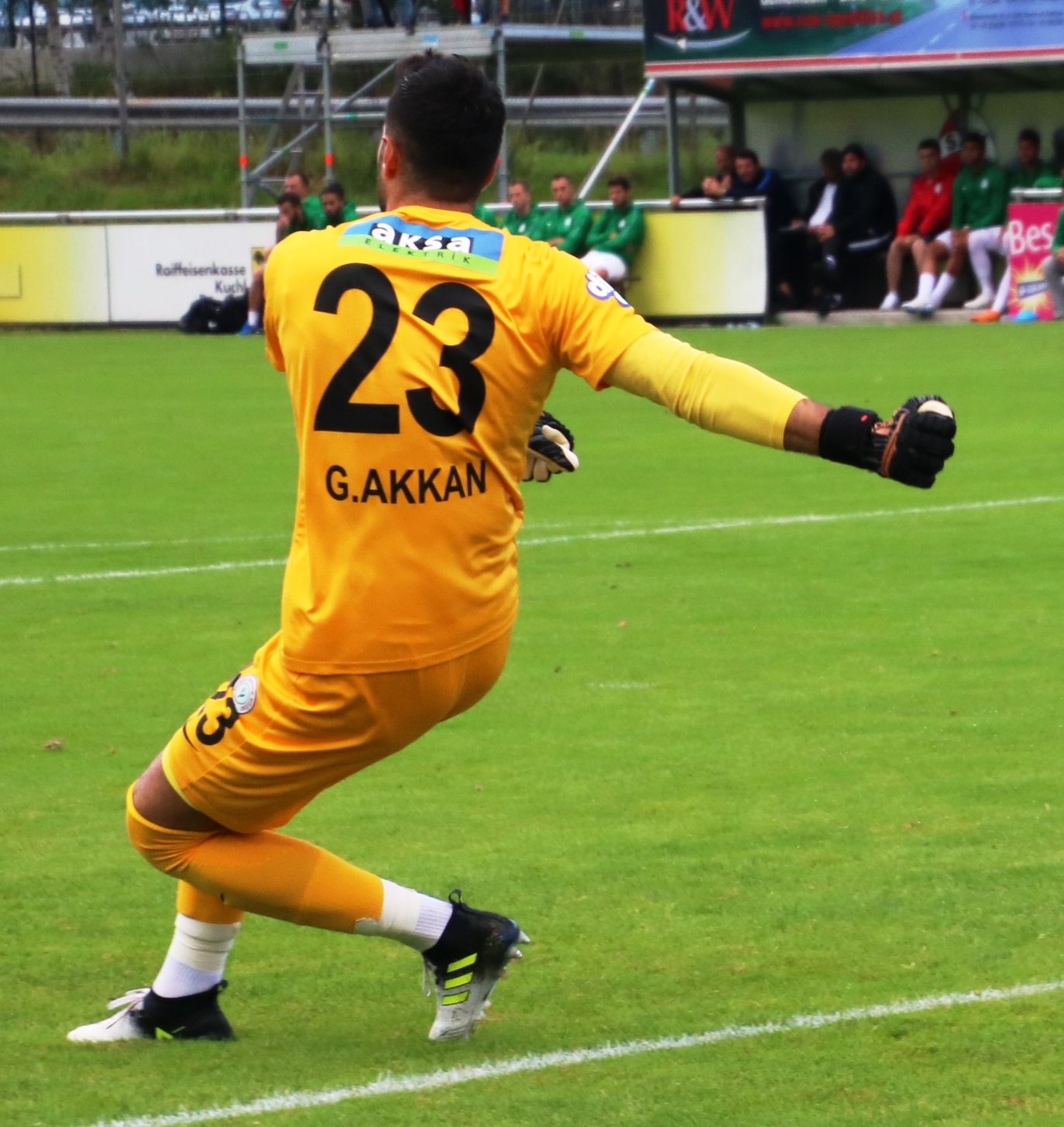

Personal information
- Date of birth: 1 January 1995 (age 31)
- Place of birth: Yozgat, Turkey
- Height: 1.88 m (6 ft 2 in)
- Position: Goalkeeper

Team information
- Current team: Sivasspor (on loan from Gençlerbirliği)
- Number: 22

Senior career*
| Years | Team | Apps | (Gls) |
| 2012–2015 | Ankaragücü | 63 | (0) |
| 2015–2024 | Çaykur Rizespor | 201 | (0) |
| 2022–2023 | → Ankaragücü (loan) | 23 | (0) |
| 2024–2025 | Bodrum | 4 | (0) |
| 2025– | Gençlerbirliği | 4 | (0) |
| 2026- | → Sivasspor (loan) | 4 | (0) |

International career^{‡}
| 2009–2010 | Turkey U15 | 2 | (0) |
| 2010 | Turkey U16 | 1 | (0) |
| 2012 | Turkey U18 | 1 | (0) |
| 2013–2014 | Turkey U19 | 6 | (0) |
| 2016 | Turkey U21 | 4 | (0) |
| 2021 | Turkey | 1 | (0) |
- * Club domestic league appearances and goals as of 9 February 2026 ‡ National team caps and goals as of 21:37, 31 May 2021 (UTC)

Gökhan Akkan (born 1 January 1995) is a Turkish professional footballer who plays as a goalkeeper for Turkish TFF 1. Lig club Sivasspor on loan from Gençlerbirliği.

== International career ==
Akkan has represented Turkey at various youth levels. He debuted for the senior Turkey national team in a friendly 2–1 win over Azerbaijan on 27 May 2021.

== Career statistics ==
As of match played 29 October 2026

Appearances and goals by club, season and competition
| Club | Season | League | | | Cup | | Other | | Total | |
| Club | Season | Division | Apps | Goals | Apps | Goals | Apps | Goals | Apps | Goals |
|---|---|---|---|---|---|---|---|---|---|---|
| Ankaragücü | 2011–12 | Süper Lig | 0 | 0 | — | | — | | 0 | 0 |
| Ankaragücü | 2012–13 | TFF 1. Lig | 13 | 0 | 2 | 0 | — | | 15 | 0 |
| Ankaragücü | 2013–14 | TFF 2. Lig | 18 | 0 | 0 | 0 | 0 | 0 | 18 | 0 |
| Ankaragücü | 2014–15 | TFF 2. Lig | 32 | 0 | 5 | 0 | — | | 37 | 0 |
| Ankaragücü | Total | | 63 | 0 | 7 | 0 | — | | 70 | 0 |
| Çaykur Rizespor | 2015–16 | Süper Lig | 1 | 0 | 9 | 0 | — | | 10 | 0 |
| Çaykur Rizespor | 2016–17 | Süper Lig | 15 | 0 | 9 | 0 | — | | 24 | 0 |
| Çaykur Rizespor | 2017–18 | TFF 1. Lig | 32 | 0 | 1 | 0 | — | | 33 | 0 |
| Çaykur Rizespor | 2018–19 | Süper Lig | 34 | 0 | 0 | 0 | — | | 34 | 0 |
| Çaykur Rizespor | 2019–20 | Süper Lig | 25 | 0 | 1 | 0 | — | | 26 | 0 |
| Çaykur Rizespor | 2020–21 | Süper Lig | 32 | 0 | 0 | 0 | — | | 39 | 0 |
| Çaykur Rizespor | 2021–22 | Süper Lig | 27 | 0 | 0 | 0 | — | | 27 | 0 |
| Çaykur Rizespor | 2023–24 | Süper Lig | 31 | 0 | 0 | 0 | — | | 31 | 0 |
| Çaykur Rizespor | 2024–25 | Süper Lig | 4 | 0 | — | | — | | 4 | 0 |
| Çaykur Rizespor | Total | | 201 | 0 | 20 | 0 | — | | 221 | 0 |
| Ankaragücü (loan) | 2022–23 | Süper Lig | 23 | 0 | 2 | 0 | — | | 25 | 0 |
| Bodrum | 2024–25 | TFF 1. Lig | 4 | 0 | 3 | 0 | — | | 7 | 0 |
| Gençlerbirliği | 2025–26 | Süper Lig | 4 | 0 | 0 | 0 | — | | 4 | 0 |
| Gençlerbirliği | 2026–27 | Süper Lig | 0 | 0 | 1 | 0 | — | | 1 | 0 |
| Gençlerbirliği | Total | | 4 | 0 | 1 | 0 | — | | 5 | 0 |
| Sivasspor (loan) | 2025–26 | TFF 1. Lig | 3 | 0 | 2 | 0 | — | | 3 | 0 |
| Career total | | | 298 | 0 | 35 | 0 | 0 | 0 | 333 | 0 |
