= 2015–16 Mersin İdmanyurdu season =

Mersin İdmanyurdu
2015–16 Hasan Doğan season
- President: (Turkey) Ali Kahramanlı (till 11 January 2016) (Turkey) Hüseyin Çalışkan (since 11 January 2016)
- Head coach: (Turkey) Mesut Bakkal (till 18 September 2015) (Turkey) Bülent Korkmaz (till 4 January 2016) (Turkey) Ümit Özat (since 19 January 2016)
- Stadium: Mersin Arena (Capacity: 25,497); Mersin, Turkey
- Süper Lig: 17 (R 20)
- Turkish Cup: Eliminated at Group Stage
- Most appearances: (Turkey) Murat Ceylan 33
- Top goalscorer: League: (Burkina Faso) Préjuce Nakoulma 6 (Brazil) Welliton 6 All: (Burkina Faso) Préjuce Nakoulma 7 (Brazil) Welliton 7
- Highest home attendance: 12.388 (vs. Galatasaray) (Süper Lig, R 21)
- Lowest home attendance: 3.000 (vs. Kasımpaşa) (Süper Lig, R 16)
- Average home league attendance: 6.244 (R 17) (League only)
Home colours	Away colours	Third colours

Mersin İdmanyurdu (also Mersin İdman Yurdu, Mersin İY, or MİY) Sports Club; located in Mersin, east Mediterranean coast of Turkey in 2015–16. Mersin İdmanyurdu football team has participated in 2015–16 season in Turkish Süper Lig. 2015–16 season was the 15th season of Mersin İdmanyurdu football team in Süper Lig, the top level division in Turkey. Team participated in 2015–16 Turkish Cup at third round.

At the start of the season Ali Kahramanlı was club president for eight years since 24 September 2008. Mesut Bakkal has started as head coach, later e resigned and Bülent Korkmaz replaced him after fifth round loss against Osmanlıspor. In the mid-season, Hüseyin Çalışkan was elected new president and agreed with Ümit Özat as the new head coach. Due to transfer bans by UEFA and then by TFF, no new transfers had been realized. Mid-fielder Murat Ceylan was the mostly appeared player during the season (33). Considering only the league matches stoppers Loret Sadiku and Milan Mitrović made the most appearances, 29, and Préjuce Nakoulma and Welliton were top goalscorers with 7 goals each.

== 2015–16 Süper Lig participation ==
2015–16 Süper Lig was played as "Spor-Toto Süper Lig" for Spor-Toto, a publicly owned betting institution, was sponsor for the season. The season named as "Hasan Doğan Season" after the name of former president of Turkish Football Federation who died at office in 2008. Start day of the season is 14 August 2015 and the end day is 22 May 2016. Champions was eligible for 2016–17 UEFA Champions League in Group stage. Runners-up were eligible for Champions League 3rd qualifying round. Third and fourth placed teams were eligible for 2016–17 UEFA Europa League at 3rd and 2nd qualifying rounds respectively. Starting from previous season 5th team in the league table was eligible for Europa League if the cup winner was among in first four placed teams. If otherwise, winner of 2015–16 Turkish Cup was eligible for Europa League at group stage. Bottom three teams were relegated to 2016–17 TFF First League.

=== Results summary ===
Mersin İdmanyurdu (MİY) 2015–16 Süper Lig season league summary:

	Overall									Home								Away							
Stage	Pc	Pl	W	D	L	GF	GA	GD	Pt	Pl	W	D	L	GF	GA	GD	Pt	Pl	W	D	L	GF	GA	GD	Pt
First half	17	17	2	4	11	21	36	-15	10	8	2	1	5	12	19	-7	7	9	0	3	6	9	17	-8	3
Second half		17	3	2	12	10	35	-25	11	9	2	2	5	7	14	-7	8	8	1	0	7	3	21	-18	3
Overall	18	34	5	6	23	31	71	-40	21	17	4	3	10	19	33	-14	15	17	1	3	13	12	38	-26	6

Sources: 2015–16 Spor-Toto Süper Lig pages.

=== League table ===
Mersin İdmanyurdu (MİY)'s place in 2015–16 Süper Lig season league table:

Pos	Team	Pld	W	D	L	GF	GA	GD	Pts	Qualification or relegation
14	Gaziantepspor	34	9	9	16	31	50	−19	36	
15	Kayserispor	34	7	13	14	25	41	−16	34	
16	Sivasspor (R)	34	6	13	15	34	48	−14	31	Relegation to TFF First League
17	Eskişehirspor (R)	34	8	6	20	39	64	−25	30	Relegation to TFF First League
18	Mersin İdman Yurdu (R)	34	5	6	23	31	71	−40	21	Relegation to TFF First League

Source: Süper Lig, Soccerway
Rules for classification: 1) Points; 2) Head-to-head points; 3) Head-to-head goal difference; 4) Head-to-head goals scored; 5) Goal difference; 6) Goals scored; 7) Play-off.
(R) Relegated

=== Results by round ===
Results of games MİY played in 2015–16 Süper Lig by rounds:

Round	1	2	3	4	5	6	7	8	9	10	11	12	13	14	15	16	17	18	19	20	21	22	23	24	25	26	27	28	29	30	31	32	33	34
Ground	H	A	H	A	H	A	A	H	A	H	A	H	A	H	A	H	A	A	H	A	H	A	H	H	A	H	A	H	A	H	A	H	A	H
Result	L	L	L	D	L	L	D	W	L	D	D	L	L	W	L	L	L	L	D	W	W	L	L	W	L	D	L	L	L	L	L	L	L	L
Position	17	18	18	17	17	17	17	17	17	17	17	17	17	17	17	17	17	17	18	17	17	17	17	16	17	17	18	18	18	18	18	18	18	18

Updated to match(es) played on 1 October 2016. Source: TFF League page
A = Away; H = Home; W = Win; D = Draw; L = Loss

=== First half ===
Mersin İdmanyurdu (MİY) 2015–16 Süper Lig season first half game reports is shown in the following table. Kick off times are in EET and EEST.

16 August 2015 Round 1	Mersin İdmanyurdu	2 – 5	Beşiktaş	Mersin Stadium, Mersin
Sunday, 22:00	Préjuce Nakoulma 20' (F); Préjuce Nakoulma 89' (F); Mehmet Taş (yellow card) 64' (red card); Wederson (yellow card) 72'	Report	9' (F) Cenk Tosun; 44' (F) Cenk Tosun; 68' (F) Cenk Tosun; 73' (F) Olcay Şahan; 90+2' Kerim Frei; (yellow card) 50' Oğuzhan Özyakup; (yellow card) 87' Tolga Zengin	Attendance: 10.500; Referee: (Turkey) Bülent Yıldırım

22 August 2015 Round 2	Akhisar Belediyespor	2 – 0	Mersin İdmanyurdu	Atatürk Stadium, Balıkesir
Saturday, 21:45	Hugo Rodallega 67' (F); Güray Vural 89' (pen.); Custódio Castro (yellow card) 53'; Merter Yüce (yellow card) 69'	Report	(yellow card) 28' Güven Varol; (yellow card) 36' Murat Ceylan; (red card) 87' Efe Özarslan	Attendance: 650; Referee: (Turkey) Kutluhan Bilgiç

29 August 2015 Round 3	Mersin İdmanyurdu	1 – 2	Kayserispor	Mersin Stadium, Mersin
Saturday, 21:15	Welliton 48' (F); Préjuce Nakoulma (yellow card) 59'; Welliton (yellow card) 72'	Report	70' (F) Ömer Bayram; 85' (F) Zeki Yavru; (yellow card) 49' İbrahim Dağaşan; (yellow card) 59' Marko Simić; (yellow card) 79' Deniz Türüç	Attendance: 4.379; Referee: (Turkey) Yaşar Kemal Uğurlu

12 September 2015 Round 4	Galatasaray	1 – 1	Mersin İdmanyurdu	TT Arena, Sarıyer, Istanbul
Saturday, 20:15	Lukas Podolski 50' (F); Hakan Balta (yellow card) 33'; Sabri Sarıoğlu (yellow card) 38'; Olcan Adın (yellow card) 90+2'; Selçuk İnan (red card) 90+4'	Report	49' (F) Welliton; (yellow card) 28' Abdul Khalili; (yellow card) 81' Muammer Yıldırım; (yellow card) 90+4' (red card) Wederson; (yellow card) 90+4' Tita	Attendance: 21.450; Referee: (Turkey) Mete Kalkavan

18 September 2015 Round 5	Mersin İdmanyurdu	0 – 4	Osmanlıspor	Mersin Stadium, Mersin
Friday, 20:00	Murat Ceylan (yellow card) 27'; Loret Sadiku (yellow card) 65'; Nurullah Kaya (yellow card) 88'	Report	34' (F) Pierre Webó; 39' (F) Papa Alioune Ndiaye; 90' (F) Papa Alioune Ndiaye; 90+2' (F) Papa Alioune Ndiaye; (yellow card) 7' Gabriel Torje; (yellow card) 77' Musa Çağıran; (yellow card) 82' Mehmet Güven	Attendance: 4.770; Referee: (Turkey) Abdulkadir Bitigen

27 September 2015 Round 6	Konyaspor	2 – 0	Mersin İdmanyurdu	Konya Büyükşehir Stadı, Konya
Sunday, 14:00	Abdou Razack Traoré 9' (F); Samuel Holmén 85' (F)	Report	(yellow card) 29' Milan Mitrović; (yellow card) 48' Serkan Balcı; (yellow card) 53' Oktay Delibalta	Attendance: 11.631; Referee: (Turkey) Bülent Birincioğlu

2 October 2015 Round 7	Sivasspor	2 – 2	Mersin İdmanyurdu	4 Eylül Stadium, Sivas
Friday, 20:00	John Boye 3' (H); Djakaridja Koné 40' (F); Mehdi Taouil (yellow card) 44'; İbrahim Öztürk (red card) 53'	Report	58' (pen.) Wederson; 82' (F) Ricardo Pedriel; (yellow card) 25' Servet Çetin; (yellow card) 75' Serkan Balcı	Attendance: 4.132; Referee: (Turkey) Umit Öztürk

19 October 2015 Round 8	Mersin İdmanyurdu	3 – 2	Trabzonspor	Mersin Stadium, Mersin
Monday, 20:00	Préjuce Nakoulma 26' (F); Préjuce Nakoulma 40' (F); Wederson 61' (F); Serkan Balcı (yellow card) 24'; Ricardo Pedriel (yellow card) 62' (red card); Wederson (yellow card) 74'; Nurullah Kaya (yellow card) 81'; Préjuce Nakoulma (yellow card) 81'	Report	75' (H) Óscar Cardozo; 90' (H) Stéphane Mbia; (yellow card) 39' Douglas Franco Teixeira; (yellow card) 59' Sefa Yılmaz	Attendance: 7.399; Referee: (Turkey) Bülent Yıldırım

24 October 2015 Round 9	Gaziantepspor	1 – 0	Mersin İdmanyurdu	Kamil Ocak Stadium, Gaziantep
Saturday, 19:00	Daniel Larsson 47' (F)	Report	(yellow card) 56' Murat Ceylan; (yellow card) 89' Loret Sadiku	Attendance: 1.857; Referee: (Turkey) Hakan Ceylan

29 October 2015 Round 10	Mersin İdmanyurdu	1 – 1	Medipol Başakşehir	Mersin Stadium, Mersin
Thursday, 19:00	Ricardo Pedriel 45' (H); Güven Varol (yellow card) 71'; Muammer Yıldırım (yellow card) 90+3'; Wederson (red card) after match'	Report	90+4' (F) Mehmet Batdal; (yellow card) 28' Mehmet Batdal; (yellow card) 45' Rajko Rotman; (yellow card) 74' Stéphane Badji	Attendance: 4.705; Referee: (Turkey) Özgüç Türkalp

6 November 2015 Round 11	Gençlerbirliği	1 – 1	Mersin İdmanyurdu	19 Mayıs Stadium, Ankara
Friday, 20:00	Bogdan Stancu 12' (F); Moestafa El Kabir (yellow card) 45'	Report	77' (F) Ricardo Pedriel; (yellow card) 41' Servet Çetin; (yellow card) 58' Ricardo Pedriel	Attendance: 1.258; Referee: (Turkey) Erkan Engin

21 November 2015 Round 12	Mersin İdmanyurdu	1 – 3	Fenerbahçe	Mersin Stadium, Mersin
Saturday, 17:00	Préjuce Nakoulma 60' (F); Ricardo Pedriel (yellow card) 66'; Servet Çetin (yellow card) 80'; Nurullah Kaya (red card) 84'	Report	8' (F) Hasan Ali Kaldırım; 49' (F) Nani; 57' (F) Robin van Persie	Attendance: 11.800; Referee: (Turkey) Alper Ulusoy

28 November 2015 Round 13	Eskişehirspor	3 – 2	Mersin İdmanyurdu	Atatürk Stadium, Eskişehir
Saturday, 19:00	Emre Güral 41' (H); Engin Bekdemir 70' (F); Emre Güral (yellow card) 43'; Kamil Çörekçi (yellow card) 44'; Raheem Lawal (yellow card) 88'	Report	28' (o.g.) Milan Mitrović; 67' (F) Welliton; 89' (H) Milan Mitrović; (yellow card) 90+2' Milan Mitrović	Attendance: 6.757; Referee: (Turkey) Cüneyt Çakır

6 December 2015 Round 14	Mersin İdmanyurdu	3 – 0	Çaykur Rizespor	Mersin Stadium, Mersin
Sunday, 19:00	Wederson 13' (pen.); Serkan Balcı 70' (F); Welliton 73' (F); Ricardo Pedriel (yellow card) 6'; Loret Sadiku (yellow card) 37'	Report	(yellow card) 52' Ertuğrul Ersoy; (yellow card) 72' Murat Duruer; (yellow card) 89' Orhan Ovacıklı	Attendance: 3.401; Referee: (Turkey) İlker Meral

12 December 2015 Round 15	Antalyaspor	3 – 2	Mersin İdmanyurdu	Akdeniz University Stadium, Antalya
Saturday, 19:00	Mbilla Etame 53' (H); Samuel Eto'o 74' (F); Lokman Gör 89' (F); Saso Fornezzi (red card) 24'	Report	26' (pen.) Milan Mitrović; 30' (H) Ricardo Pedriel; (yellow card) 33' Milan Mitrović; (yellow card) 44' Ricardo Pedriel; (yellow card) 72' Oktay Delibalta; (yellow card) 77' Wederson; (yellow card) 84' Préjuce Nakoulma; (yellow card) 87' Serkan Balcı	Attendance: 6.113; Referee: (Turkey) Barış Şimşek

19 December 2015 Round 16	Mersin İdmanyurdu	1 – 2	Kasımpaşa	Mersin Stadium, Mersin
Saturday, 19:00	Servet Çetin 1' (H); Préjuce Nakoulma (yellow card) 45'; Oktay Delibalta (yellow card) 59'; Wederson (yellow card) 63'; Murat Ceylan (yellow card) 72'; Milan Mitrović (red card) 90+2'	Report	20' (F) Eren Derdiyok; 90+4' (H) Ryan Donk; (yellow card) 78' Ryan Donk; (red card) 83' Vasil Bozhikov	Attendance: 3.000; Referee: (Turkey) Hüseyin Göçek

27 December 2015 Round 17	Bursaspor	2 – 1	Mersin İdmanyurdu	Atatürk Stadium, Bursa
Sunday, 14:00	Tomáš Necid 47' (F); Sercan Yıldırım 54' (H); Hajime Hosogai (yellow card) 51'; Tomáš Sivok (yellow card) 85'; Serdar Aziz (yellow card) 90'	Report	37' (F) Welliton; (yellow card) 50' Eren Tozlu; (yellow card) 81' Servet Çetin	Attendance: 10.398; Referee: (Turkey) Tolga Özkalfa

Sources: 2015–16 Süper Lig pages.

=== Second half ===
Mersin İdmanyurdu (MİY) 2015–16 Süper Lig season second half game reports is shown in the following table. Kick off times are in EET and EEST.

17 February 2016 Round 18	Beşiktaş	1 - 0	Mersin İdmanyurdu	FT Stadium, Başakşehir, Istanbul
Wednesday, 19:30	José Sosa 73' (F); Duško Tošić (yellow card) 58'; Necip Uysal (yellow card) 59'	Report	(yellow card) 69' Milan Mitrović; (yellow card) 72' Ricardo Pedriel	Attendance: 7.385; Referee: (Turkey) Barış Şimşek
Note: The game was started on 17 January 2016, Sunday, 20:00, but was suspended by referee Mete Kalkavan at 12' and delayed by TFF due to adverse weather conditions. On Feb 17 game started from 12'.

23 January 2016 Round 19	Mersin İdmanyurdu	0 – 0	Akhisar Belediyespor	Mersin Stadium, Mersin
Saturday, 16:00	Serkan Balcı (yellow card) 16'; Milan Mitrović (yellow card) 34'	Report	(yellow card) 8' Merter Yüce; (yellow card) 13' Kadir Keleş; (yellow card) 20' Douglão	Attendance: 3.430; Referee: (Turkey) Bülent Birincioğlu

6 February 2016 Round 20	Kayserispor	0 – 1	Mersin İdmanyurdu	B.B. Kadir Has Stadium, Kayseri
Saturday, 13:30	Ömer Bayram (yellow card) 5'; Samba Sow (yellow card) 17'; Mustafa Akbaş (yellow card) 19' (red card)	Report	20' (pen.) Wederson; (yellow card) 13' Wederson; (yellow card) 14' Mehmet Sığırcı; (yellow card) 77' Serkan Balcı; (yellow card) 90' Eren Tozlu	Attendance: 2.150; Referee: (Turkey) Halil Umut Meler

13 February 2016 Round 21	Mersin İdmanyurdu	2 – 1	Galatasaray	Mersin Stadium, Mersin
Saturday, 19:00	Préjuce Nakoulma 39' (F); Güven Varol 63' (H); Serkan Balcı (yellow card) 77'; Loret Sadiku (yellow card) 83'	Report	88' (F) Lukas Podolski; (yellow card) 15' Lionel Carole; (yellow card) 28' Semih Kaya; (yellow card) 38' Ryan Donk; (yellow card) 53' (red card) Semih Kaya; (yellow card) 65' Wesley Sneijder; (yellow card) 76' Yasin Öztekin; (yellow card) 90' Aurélien Chedjou; (yellow card) 90' Sabri Sarıoğlu	Attendance: 12.388; Referee: (Turkey) Yaşar Kemal Uğurlu

21 February 2016 Round 22	Osmanlıspor	3 – 1	Mersin İdmanyurdu	Osmanlı Stadium, Ankara
Sunday, 13:00	Raul Rusescu 35' (H); Musa Çağıran 66' (H); Raheem Lawal 90' (F); Dzon Delarge (yellow card) 76'; Raheem Lawal (yellow card) 80'; Musa Çağıran (yellow card) 86'	Report	(() Abdul Khalili; (yellow card) 54' Mehmet Taş; (yellow card) 85' Wederson	Attendance: 4,051; Referee: (Turkey) Kutluhan Bilgic

27 February 2016 Round 23	Mersin İdmanyurdu	0 – 2	Konyaspor	Mersin Stadium, Mersin
Saturday, 13:30	Tita (yellow card) 25' (red card); Güven Varol (yellow card) 68'	Report	62' (F) Abdou Razack Traoré; 76' (H) Riad Bajić; (yellow card) 17' Nejc Skubic; (yellow card) 20' Dimitar Rangelov	Attendance: 4.260; Referee: (Turkey) Alper Ulusoy

4 March 2016 Round 24	Mersin İdmanyurdu	1 – 0	Sivasspor	Mersin Stadium, Mersin
Friday, 20:00	Welliton 62' (F); Loret Sadiku (yellow card) 45'; Welliton (yellow card) 62'; Milan Mitrović (yellow card) 85'	Report	(yellow card) 51' Yiğit İncedemir; (yellow card) 82' Beykan Şimşek; (yellow card) 86' Mehdi Taouil; (yellow card) 90+2' John Boye	Attendance: 4.470; Referee: (Turkey) Bülent Yıldırım

11 March 2016 Round 25	Trabzonspor	1 – 0	Mersin İdmanyurdu	Hüseyin Avni Aker Stadium, Trabzon
Friday, 20:00	Óscar Cardozo 48' (F); José Bosingwa (yellow card) 19'; Mustafa Yumlu (yellow card) 63'; Okay Yokuşlu (yellow card) 69'	Report	(yellow card) 60' Wederson; (yellow card) 63' Welliton; Loret Sadiku (yellow card) 73'; Ricardo Pedriel (yellow card) 85'	Attendance: 8.896; Referee: (Turkey) Halis Özkahya

20 March 2016 Round 26	Mersin İdmanyurdu	0 – 0	Gaziantepspor	Mersin Stadium, Mersin
Sunday, 13:30	Welliton (yellow card) 31'; Güven Varol (yellow card) 59'; Milan Mitrović (yellow card) 62'	Report	(yellow card) 52' Barış Yardımcı; (yellow card) 90' Emre Nefiz	Attendance: 4.947; Referee: (Turkey) Tolga Özkalfa

3 April 2016 Round 27	Medipol Başakşehir	3 – 0	Mersin İdmanyurdu	FT Stadium, Başakşehir, Istanbul
Sunday, 13:30	Edin Višća 7' (pen.); Mossoró 30' (F); Hakan Özmert 49' (F); Stefano Napoleoni (yellow card) 87'	Report	{{yel<62}} Ricardo Pedriel; (yellow card) 70' Abdul Khalili	Attendance: 1.182; Referee: (Turkey)

10 April 2016 Round 28	Mersin İdmanyurdu	1 – 3	Gençlerbirliği	Mersin Stadium, Mersin
Sunday, 13:30	Ricardo Pedriel 90' (H); Serkan Balcı (yellow card) 7'; Milan Mitrović (yellow card) 73'	Report	16' (F) Bogdan Stancu; 45' (F) Djalma Campos; 79' (F) Djalma Campos	Attendance: 3.647; Referee: (Turkey) Özgür Yankaya

17 April 2016 Round 29	Fenerbahçe	4 – 1	Mersin İdmanyurdu	Ülker Stadium, Kadıköy, Istanbul
Sunday, 19:00	Volkan Şen 7' (F); Volkan Şen 9' (F); Fernandão 57' (f); Robin van Persie 63' (pen.)	Report	45' (H) Güven Varol; (yellow card) 46' Eren Tozlu	Attendance: 19.561; Referee: (Turkey) Serkan Çınar

24 April 2016 Round 30	Mersin İdmanyurdu	1 – 2	Eskişehirspor	Mersin Stadium, Mersin
Sunday, 13:30	Mehmet Taş 37' (H); Serkan Balcı (yellow card) 31'; Milan Mitrović (yellow card) 71'	Report	55' (F) Mehemt Murat Uçar; 90' (F) Tornike Okriashvili; (yellow card) 84' Emre Güngör; (yellow card) 90' Mehmet Murat Uçar	Attendance: 2.165; Referee: (Turkey) Mete Kalkavan

1 May 2016 Round 31	Çaykur Rizespor	2 – 0	Mersin İdmanyurdu	New City Stadium, Rize
Saturday, 19:00	Ahmet İlhan Özek 22' (F); Mehmet Akyüz 74' (F)	Report	(yellow card) 43' Mehmet Taş	Attendance: 2.448; Referee: (Turkey) Cüneyt Çakır

8 May 2016 Round 32	Mersin İdmanyurdu	0 – 1	Antalyaspor	Mersin Stadium, Mersin
Sunday, 19:00	Loret Sadiku (yellow card) 32'; Güven Varol (yellow card) 62'	Report	20' (F) Mbilla Etame; (yellow card) 65' (red card) Sakıb Aytaç; (yellow card) 67' Jean Makoun	Attendance: 920; Referee: (Turkey) Mehmet Emre Atasoy

15 May 2016 Round 33	Kasımpaşa	7 – 0	Mersin İdmanyurdu	RTE Stadium, Kasımpaşa, Istanbul
Sunday, 19:00	Adem Büyük 19' (F); Bengali-Fodé Koita 36' (F); Ezequiel Óscar Scarione 44' (F); André Castro 57' (F); Ezequiel Óscar Scarione 66' (F); Ezequiel Óscar Scarione 75' (F); Hakan Arslan 83' (F)	Report	(yellow card) 43' Gökhan Akkan	Attendance: - Referee: (Turkey) Murat Özcan

18 May 2016 Round 34	Mersin İdmanyurdu	2 – 5	Bursaspor	Mersin Stadium, Mersin
Wednesday, 20:00	Mahmut Metin 27' (F); Gökhan Akkan 84' (H); Mahmut Metin (yellow card) 40'; Berkan Afşarlı (yellow card) 51'	Report	3' (F) Kubilay Kanatsızkuş; 25' (H) Kubilay Kanatsızkuş; 55' (F) Pablo Batalla; 75' (F) Talha Çalışkan; 90+1' (F) Furkan Emre Ünever; (yellow card) 62' Ricardo Faty; (yellow card) 70' Kubilay Kanatsızkuş	Attendance: 785; Referee: (Turkey) Oktay Taş

Sources: 2015–16 Süper Lig pages.

== 2015–16 Turkish Cup participation ==
2015–16 Turkish Cup was played for 54th time as Ziraat Türkiye Kupası for sponsorship reasons. The cup was played by 159 teams in three stages. In the first stage, a preliminary qualification round and three elimination rounds were played in one-leg elimination system. In the second stage, 32 teams played two-legs round-robin games in 8 groups, 4 in each. In the third stage, knock-out games were played in two-leg elimination system. Mersin İdmanyurdu attended the cup in 3rd elimination round and eliminated Second League (third division) team Fatih Karagümrük after penalties and promoted to group stage. In group stage MİY took place in Group D. After the group games İdmanyurdu became 3rd in Group D and was eliminated. Galatasaray won the Cup for 17th time.

=== Cup track ===
The drawings and results Mersin İdmanyurdu (MİY) followed in 2015–16 Turkish Cup are shown in the following table.

Round	Own League	Opponent's League	Opponent	Away	Home	Result
Round 3	Süper Lig	2nd League Red Group	Fatih Karagümrük	8–7	–	Promoted
Group D	Süper Lig	2nd League Red Group	Aydınspor 1923	0–4	4–0	
Group D	Süper Lig	Süper Lig	Çaykur Rizespor	0–1	2–2	
Group D	Süper Lig	2nd League Red Group	Bucaspor	0–1	1–2	Eliminated

Note: In the above table 'Score' shows For and Against goals whether the match played at home or not.

=== Game details ===
Mersin İdmanyurdu (MİY) 2015–16 Turkish Cup game reports is shown in the following table. Kick off times are in EET and EEST.

2 December 2015 Round 3	Fatih Karagümrük	3 – 3 (a.e.t.) (4 – 5 p)	Mersin İdmanyurdu	Vefa Stadium, Karagümrük, Istanbul
Wednesday, 13:00	Serdar Dursun 26' (F); Yasin Şahan 51' (H); Hakan Soylu 83' (F); Yasin Şahan (yellow card) 33'; Mehmet Yılmaz (yellow card) 80'; Muhammed Akarslan (yellow card) 90'; Serhat Keskinsoy (yellow card) 110'; Cankut Atasoy (yellow card) 120'	Report	40' (F) Mehmet Taş; 68' (F) Mehmet Taş; 90' (F) Tita; (yellow card) 64' Nurullah Kaya; (yellow card) 74' Mehmet Taş; (yellow card) 116' Serol Demirhan	Attendance: 420; Referee: (Turkey) Levent Balcı
	Penalties
	Mehmet Yılmaz (penalty scored); Serdar Dursun (penalty scored); Gökhan Şen (penalty scored); Muhammed Akarslan (penalty missed); Serhat Keskinsoy (penalty scored) Mert Ilıman (penalty missed)		(penalty missed) Tita; (penalty scored) Eren Tozlu; (penalty scored) Berkan Afşarlı; (penalty scored) Murat Ceylan; (penalty scored) Mehmet Taş (penalty scored) Güven Varol

16 December 2015 GS Round 1	Aydınspor 1923	4 – 0	Mersin İdmanyurdu	Adnan Menderes Stadium, Aydın
Wednesday, 13:00	Gürcan Gözüm 5' (F); Uğur Tülümen 43' (F); Mehmet Bektaş 45' (F); Mehmet Bektaş 65' (F)	Report	(yellow card) 41' Hakan Olkan; (yellow card) 70' Murat Ceylan	Attendance: 3.500; Referee: (Turkey) Ali Şansalan

22 December 2015 GS Round 2	Mersin İdmanyurdu	2 – 2	Çaykur Rizespor	Mersin Stadium, Mersin
Tuesday, 19:00	Berkan Afşarlı 55' (F); Sinan Kaloğlu 82' (F); Hakan Olkan (yellow card) 64'; Eren Tozlu (yellow card) 77'	Report	2' (F) Patryk Tuszyński; 38' (F) Mehmet Akyüz	Attendance: 500; Referee: (Turkey) Mehmet Emre Atasoy

9 January 2016 GS Round 3	Bucaspor	1 – 0	Mersin İdmanyurdu	Buca Arena, Buca, İzmir
Saturday, 16:00	Onur Yılmaz (yellow card) 88'; Alper Sürücü (yellow card) 90'	Report	73' (o.g.) Serol Demirhan; (yellow card) 68' Eren Tozlu; (yellow card) 81' Tekin Oğrak; (yellow card) 90' Hakan Olkan	Attendance: 1.100; Referee: (Turkey) Çağdaş Altay

13 January 2015 GS Round 4	Mersin İdmanyurdu	1 – 2	Bucaspor	Mersin Stadium, Mersin
Wednesday, 20:30	Préjuce Nakoulma 64' (F); Eren Tozlu (yellow card) 45'; Mehmet Taş (yellow card) 47'; Hakan Olkan (yellow card) 70'; Tekin Oğrak (yellow card) 90+5'	Report	90+2' (F) Alper Sürücü; 90+6' (pen.) Emre Şahin; (yellow card) 26' Ferhat Çulcuoğlu; (yellow card) 45' Deniz Pero	Attendance: 300; Referee: (Turkey) Selim Özen

20 January 2015 GS Round 5	Mersin İdmanyurdu	4 – 0	Aydınspor 1923	Mersin Stadium, Mersin
Wednesday, 13:00	Ricardo Pedriel 32' (H); Milan Mitrović 37' (pen.); Tita 45' (F); Welliton 64' (F)	Report	(yellow card) 37' Hasan Erbey; (red card) 39' Ulaş Güler; (yellow card) 46' Gürkan Öztürk; (yellow card) 73' Gürcan Gözüm; (yellow card) 77' Erdi Bakırcı	Attendance: 500; Referee: (Turkey) Emre Türkmen

28 January 2015 GS Round 6	Çaykur Rizespor	1 – 0	Mersin İdmanyurdu	A. Suat Özyazıcı Stadium, Trabzon
Thursday, 18:00	Ludovic Sylvestre 14' (F)	Report	(yellow card) 41' Mehmet Taş	Attendance: 70; Referee: (Turkey) Mustafa İlker Coşkun
Note: The game was originally scheduled on 27 January 2016, Wednesday, 17:00 in New Rize Stadium, but was delayed and moved to Trabzon due to adverse weather conditions.

Source: 2015–16 Turkish Cup (Ziraat Türkiye Kupası) official TFF page. Attendance data from ntvspor.net.

== Management ==
At the start of the season, president Ali Kahramanlı continued in his position which he held in 2008. In the mid-season Hüseyin Çalışkan who was former president and a businessman from Mersin was elected president. Former president Hamit İzol was declared honorary president. Club address was: Palmiye Mah. Adnan Menders Bl. 1204 Sk. Onur Ap. K.2 D.3 Yenişehir/Mersin.

=== Club management ===
On 11 January 2016 club congress was held and a new executive committee took over the club:

- Executive committee: Hüseyin Çalışkan (president); Senan İdin, Özgür Sanal (vice -presidents); Beşir Acar (deputy vice-president); Abdi Kurt, Mahsum Sevimli (General Secretary); Hikmet Kaya, Vedat Yüksel (football division); Sedat Aydöner (financial affairs), Akif Serin (public institutions and foreign affairs); Sabri Tekli (the 1925 project); Mehmet Can Duman, Abdi Öztürk, Vedat Yüksel (amateur divisions and youth setup); Mahsum Sevimli (legal affairs); Murat Altındere (spokesman and trademark); Metin Yıldıran (ads, sponsorships and funding); Engin Şahin (facilities, investments, projects); Cihat Gündoğar (spectators).

President Kahramanlı resigned due to health problems and financial difficulties after eight years on 9 December 2015. Later he turned back until the new congress on 11 January 2016. Before his resignation the club management was as follows:

- Executive committee: Ali Kahramanlı (president); Senan İdin (vice-president); Mehmet Özgür Sanal (vice-president); Beşir Acar (deputy vice-president); Sedat Aydöner (financial affairs); Hikmet Kaya (football division and youth setup); Ahmet Turan Serttaş (professional football); Adem Serin (General secretary); Şerafettin Kadooğlu (deputy vice-president); İlkay Mahanoğlu (legal affairs); Ahmet Nusret Canözkan (advertisements, sponsorships and fund searching); Mustafa Yüksel Güngör and Murat Harman (facilities, investments and projects); Ayhan Erdem (spokesman); Metin Yıldıran (deputy vice-president).
- Administrative personnel: Mesut Bilir (general coordinator); Murat Öğ (general director); Duygu Gürani (accreditations); Özcan Ulusoy (bookkeeping); Rıfkı Çınar (press relations); Barış Köksal (social media); Mustafa Kaya (security); Ökkeş Aybar (A team driver).

=== Coaching team ===
2015–16 Mersin İdmanyurdu head coaches

Nat	Head coach	Period	Pl	W	D	L	Notes
(Turkey)	Rıza Çalımbay	15.06.2015 – 28.06.2016	–	–	–	–	Resigned.
(Turkey)	Mesut Bakkal	03.07.2015 – 18.09.2016	5	0	1	4	Resigned.
(Turkey)	Bülent Korkmaz	22.09.2015 – 04.01.2016	15	2	5	8	Unilateral cancellation (dismissed in mid-season camp).
(Turkey)	Hakan Kutlu	05.01.2016 – 06.01.2016	–	–	–	–	Attended and left the camp next day.
(Turkey)	Serkan Damla	06.01.2016 – 18.01.2016	2	0	0	2	Trainer. Managed the team in cup matches in interim period.
(Turkey)	Nurullah Sağlam	12.01.2016 – 14.01.2016	–	–	–	–	Signed for 1,5 years, but left after two days.
(Turkey)	Ümit Özat	19.01.2016 – 06.05.2016	16	4	2	10	Contract was terminated
(Turkey)	Serkan Damla	06.05.2016 – 31.05.2016	3	0	0	3	Trainer. Managed the team at the end of the season.

Note: Only official games were included.

Other coaching team members were as follows:

- Mesut Bakkal's team: Ümit Bozkurt (trainer), Zafer Özgültekin (goalkeeper coach);
- Bülent Korkmaz's team: Çağdaş Çavuş (trainer), Ümit Bozkurt (trainer), Zafer Özgültekin (goalkeeper coach), Murat Kuyucuoğlu (trainer);
- Ümit Özat's team: Önder Engin (trainer), Gökhan Tokgöz (trainer), Sonkan Konak (youth team).
- Tamer Sivrikaya (trainer), Serkan Damla (trainer), Nezih Ali Boloğlu (goalkeeper coach), Eren Matyar (U21 team), Muzaffer Tozlu (U21 team), Ali ÖmerSakarya (U19 team), Sedat Hazımoğlu (U17 team), Mesud Cömert (U16 team), Tarkan Özyılmaz (U15 team), Burhan Baygın (U15 team), Oğuzhan Doğar (U15 team), Önal Arıca (U14 team), Ahmet Edremit (physician), Serkan Sağlık (physiotherapist), Abdulkadir Topal, Kemal Gürgez, Ersoy Şenel Oktay Baş (masseurs).

== 2015–16 squad ==
Appearances, goals and cards count for 2015–16 Süper Lig and Türkiye Kupası (2015–16 Turkish Cup) games. Only the players who appeared in game rosters were included. Player's are listed in order of appearance. MİY could not signed with new players in Summer 2015, because FIFA decided on two season transfer ban for MİY due to termination of the contract of the MİY's former player David Bičík. The ban was applied for 2015 Winter and Summer transfer seasons. Although the UEFA ban was removed after two transfer seasons, this time TFF did not open transfer table due to financial difficulties. Therefore, no new transfers became possible in 2015–16 season.

O	N	Nat	Name	Birth	Born	Pos	LA	LG	CA	CG	TA	TG	Yellow card	Red card	← Season Notes →
1	1	(Bulgaria)	Nikolay Mihaylov	28 Jun 1988	Sofia	GK	3				3				→ previous season.
2	3	(Kosovo)	Loret Sadiku	28 Jul 1991	Pristina	DF	29				29		7		→ previous season.
3	6	(Brazil)	Wederson	22 Jul 1981	Campos	DF	26	4	1		27	4	9	2	→ previous season.
4	10	(Brazil)	Tita	20 Jul 1981	Rio de J.	FW	25		4	2	29	2	2	1	→ previous season.
5	11	(Brazil)	Welliton	22 Oct 1986	Conceição	FW	21	6	1	1	22	7	4		→ previous season.
6	13	(Turkey)	Oktay Delibalta	27 Oct 1985	Samsun	MF	15				15		3		→ previous season.
7	15	(Serbia)	Milan Mitrović	2 Jul 1988	Prokuplje	DF	29	2	2	1	31	3	9	1	→ previous season.
8	22	(Burkina Faso)	Préjuce Nakoulma	21 Apr 1987	Ouaga	FW	27	6	4	1	31	7	4		→ previous season.
9	25	(Turkey)	Mehmet Taş	20 Mar 1991	Mersin	DF	22	1	7	2	29	3	5	1	→ previous season.
10	30	(Turkey)	Serkan Balcı	22 Aug 1983	Nazilli	DF	28	1	3		31	1	9		→ previous season.
11	55	(Sweden)	Abdul Khalili	7 Jun 1992	Raus, Se	MF	23	1			23	1	2		→ previous season.
12	90	(Turkey)	Muammer Yıldırım	14 Sep 1990	Eğil	GK	26				26	2			→ previous season.
13	7	(Turkey)	Güven Varol	2 Jun 1981	Adapazarı	MF	27	2	4		31	2	5		→ previous season.
14	33	(Turkey)	Efe Özarslan	29 Mar 1990	Mersin	DF	2		2		4			1	→ previous season.
15	4	(Turkey)	Mehmet Sığırcı	24 Feb 1993	Güngören	DF	4		6		10		1		→ previous season.
16	58	(Bolivia)	Ricardo Pedriel	19 Jan 1987	Santa Cruz	FW	27	5	4	1	31	6	8	1	→ previous season.
17	72	(Turkey)	Nurullah Kaya	20 Jul 1986	Batman	MF	9		6		15		2	1	→ previous season.
18	99	(Hungary)	Márkó Futács	22 Feb 1990	Budapest	FW	4				4				→ previous season.
19	5	(Turkey)	Murat Ceylan	2 Mar 1988	Gaziantep	MF	27		6		33		5		→ previous season.
20	76	(Turkey)	Servet Çetin	17 Mar 1981	Tuzluca	DF	14	1			14	1	4		→ previous season.
21	17	(Turkey)	Sinan Kaloğlu	10 Jun 1981	Ovacık	FW	17		3	1	20	1			→ previous season.
22	90	(Turkey)	Nihat Şahin	15 Sep 1989	İzmir	GK	5		6		11				→ previous season.
23	39	(Turkey)	Eren Tozlu	27 Dec 1990	Giresun	FW	18		6		24		7		→ previous season.
24	88	(Turkey)	Serol Demirhan	5 Dec 1988	Altındağ	DF	11		6		17		1		→ previous season.
25	42	(Turkey)	Berkan Afşarlı	1 Mar 1991	Lindau	MF	5		4	1	9	1	1		→ previous season.
26	92	(Turkey)	Hakan Olkan	9 Jan 1992	Şişli	DF	5		6		11		4		→ previous season.
27	95	(Turkey)	Hasan Daş	6 Jan 1995	Mersin	GK	1		2		3				→ previous season.
28	47	(Turkey)	Tekin Oğrak	13 Apr 1991	Nusaybin	MF	3		5		8		2		→ previous season.
29	77	(Turkey)	Rahmi Çelik	11 Aug 1995	Güzelyurt	DF			1		1				→ previous season.
30	94	(Turkey)	Emrah Özyaylaz	1 Dec 1994	Mersin	MF	2		1		3				→ previous season.
31	96	(Turkey)	Taner Çukadar	4 Aug 1998	Mersin	DF	4		1		5				→ previous season.
32	98	(Turkey)	Mahmut Metin	12 Jul 1994	Besni	MF	4	1	1		5	1	1		→ previous season.
33	46	(Turkey)	Mehmet Ali Kaçar	18 Jan 1998	Afşin	MF	1		1		2				→ previous season.
34	66	(Turkey)	Gökhan Akkan	30 Aug 1998	Seyhan	DF	7	1	1		8	1	1		→ previous season.
35	45	(Turkey)	Hilmi Reşiti	29 Jul 1997	Bornova	DF									→ previous season.

Sources: TFF club page and maçkolik team page.

== U-21 and U-19 teams ==
Mersin İdmanyurdu U-21 team participated in U21 League Süper Lig and U19 team in Elite U19 League.

== See also ==
- Football in Turkey
- 2015–16 Süper Lig
- 2015–16 Turkish Cup
