= 2014–15 Mersin İdmanyurdu season =

Mersin İdmanyurdu
2014–15 Süleyman Seba season
- President: (Turkey) Ali Kahramanlı
- Head coach: (Turkey) Rıza Çalımbay
- Stadium: Mersin Arena (Capacity: 25,497); Tevfik Sırrı Gür Stadium (Capacity: 10,128); Mersin, Turkey
- Süper Lig: 7th
- Turkish Cup: Eliminated at Quarter-finals
- Most appearances: (Turkey) Güven Varol (39) (Turkey) Murat Ceylan (39)
- Top goalscorer: League: (Brazil) Welliton (10); All: (Brazil) Welliton (13)
- Highest home attendance: 16.500 (vs. Galatasaray) (Süper Lig, R 31)
- Lowest home attendance: 1.750 (vs. Başakşehir) (Süper Lig, R 34)
- Average home league attendance: 7.200
| Home colours | Away colours | Third colours |

Mersin İdmanyurdu (also Mersin İdman Yurdu, Mersin İY, or MİY) Sports Club; located in Mersin, east Mediterranean coast of Turkey in 2014–15. Mersin İdmanyurdu football team in 2014–15 season in Turkish Süper Lig. 2014–15 season was the 14th season of Mersin İdmanyurdu football team in Süper Lig, the top level division in Turkey. Mersin İdmanyurdu football team has finished 2014–15 season in 7th place in Turkish Süper Lig and remained in the league. Team participated in 2014–15 Turkish Cup and was eliminated at quarterfinals.

Ali Kahramanlı was club president. Rıza Çalımbay was head coach. Attacking midfielder Güven Varol and defensive midfielder Murat Ceylan were the most appeared players with 39 appearances in total. Captain and centre back Servet Çetin was most appeared player in league matches with 33 appearances. Welliton was the top goalscorer with 13 goals.

== 2014–15 Süper Lig participation ==
Süper Lig was played as "Spor-Toto Süper Lig" for Spor-Toto, a publicly owned betting institution, was sponsor for the season. The name of the season was inscribed as "Süleyman Seba Season" in memory of Beşiktaş's former president Süleyman Seba. 18 teams attended. MİY was one of the new entrants along with Balıkesirspor and İstanbul Büyükşehir Belediyespor who changed their names as İstanbul Başakşehir F.K. before the start of the season. Champions was eligible for 2015–16 UEFA Champions League in Group stage. Runners-up were eligible for Champions League 3rd qualifying round. Third and fourth placed teams were eligible for 2015–16 UEFA Europa League at 3rd and 2nd qualifying rounds respectively. Starting from this season 5th team in the league table was eligible for Europa League if the cup winner was among in first four placed teams. If otherwise, winner of 2014–15 Turkish Cup was eligible for Europa League at group stage. Bottom three teams were relegated to 2015–16 TFF First League.

=== Results summary ===
Mersin İdmanyurdu (MİY) 2014–15 Süper Lig season league summary:

| | Overall | | | | | | | | | Home | | | | | | | | Away | | | | | | | |
| Stage | Pc | Pl | W | D | L | GF | GA | GD | Pt | Pl | W | D | L | GF | GA | GD | Pt | Pl | W | D | L | GF | GA | GD | Pt |
|---|---|---|---|---|---|---|---|---|---|---|---|---|---|---|---|---|---|---|---|---|---|---|---|---|---|
| First half | 8 | 17 | 6 | 5 | 6 | 24 | 22 | +2 | 23 | 8 | 5 | 2 | 1 | 14 | 7 | +7 | 17 | 9 | 1 | 3 | 5 | 10 | 15 | -5 | 6 |
| Second half | | 17 | 7 | 3 | 7 | 30 | 26 | +4 | 24 | 9 | 3 | 2 | 4 | 15 | 15 | 0 | 11 | 8 | 4 | 1 | 3 | 15 | 11 | +4 | 13 |
| Overall | 7 | 34 | 13 | 8 | 13 | 54 | 48 | +6 | 47 | 17 | 8 | 4 | 5 | 29 | 22 | +7 | 28 | 17 | 5 | 4 | 8 | 25 | 26 | -1 | 19 |

Sources: 2014–15 Spor-Toto Süper Lig pages.

=== League table ===
Mersin İdmanyurdu (MİY) 2014–15 Süper Lig season place in league table.

| Pos | Team | Pld | W | D | L | GF | GA | GD | Pts | Qualification or relegation |
|---|---|---|---|---|---|---|---|---|---|---|
| 5 | Trabzonspor | 34 | 15 | 12 | 7 | 58 | 48 | +10 | 57 (Note: Trabzonspor finished ahead of Bursaspor on head-to-head record: Trabzonspor–Bursaspor 1–0, Bursaspor–Trabzonspor 3–3.) | Qualification for the Europa League second qualifying round |
| 6 | Bursaspor (Note: Bursaspor were banned from European competitions by UEFA for the following four seasons due to financial issues.) | 34 | 16 | 9 | 9 | 69 | 44 | +25 | 57 | |
| 7 | Mersin İdmanyurdu (Note: Mersin İdmanyurdu, Gaziantepspor, Eskişehirspor, Balıkesirspor, Kasımpaşa and Kayseri Erciyesspor were not granted a UEFA licence by the Turkish Football Federation, and could therefore not qualify for European competitions.) | 34 | 13 | 8 | 13 | 54 | 48 | +6 | 47 | |
| 8 | Konyaspor | 34 | 12 | 10 | 12 | 30 | 39 | −9 | 46 | |
| 9 | Gençlerbirliği | 34 | 10 | 10 | 14 | 46 | 44 | +2 | 40 (Note: Gençlerbirliği finished ahead of Gaziantepspor on head-to-head record: Gençlerbirliği–Gaziantepspor 2–0, Gaziantepspor–Gençlerbirliği 0–3.) | |

Source: Süper Lig
Rules for classification: 1) points; 2) head-to-head points; 3) head-to-head goal difference; 4) goal difference; 5) number of goals scored (It is also decided that only criteria 1, 4 and 5 would be applied to establish the classification during the competition)

=== Results by round ===
Results of games MİY played in 2014–15 Süper Lig by rounds:

| Round | 1 | 2 | 3 | 4 | 5 | 6 | 7 | 8 | 9 | 10 | 11 | 12 | 13 | 14 | 15 | 16 | 17 | 18 | 19 | 20 | 21 | 22 | 23 | 24 | 25 | 26 | 27 | 28 | 29 | 30 | 31 | 32 | 33 | 34 |
|---|---|---|---|---|---|---|---|---|---|---|---|---|---|---|---|---|---|---|---|---|---|---|---|---|---|---|---|---|---|---|---|---|---|---|
| Ground | H | A | H | A | H | A | H | A | H | A | H | A | H | A | A | H | A | A | H | A | H | A | H | A | H | A | H | A | H | A | H | H | A | H |
| Result | L | D | W | W | W | L | W | L | W | D | W | L | D | L | L | D | D | L | W | W | W | L | L | L | L | W | D | W | W | D | L | L | W | D |
| Position | 17 | 17 | 6 | 4 | 2 | 4 | 2 | 6 | 4 | 4 | 4 | 4 | 6 | 6 | 8 | 9 | 8 | 8 | 8 | 7 | 7 | 7 | 7 | 7 | 8 | 7 | 7 | 7 | 7 | 7 | 7 | 8 | 7 | 7 |

Source: TFF League page
A = Away; H = Home; W = Win; D = Draw; L = Loss

=== First half ===
Mersin İdmanyurdu (MİY) 2014–15 Süper Lig season first half game reports is shown in the following table. Kick off times are in EET and EEST.

| 30 August 2014 Round 1 | Mersin İdmanyurdu | 0 – 1 | Beşiktaş | Mersin Arena, Mersin |
| Saturday, 21:45 | Mehmet Enes Sığırcı (yellow card) 52'; Nihat Şahin (yellow card) 90+3' | Report | 43' (H) Cenk Tosun; (yellow card) 18' İsmail Köybaşı; (yellow card) 57' Necip Uysal | Attendance: 10.000; Referee: Tolga Özkalfa |

| 14 September 2014 Round 2 | Kasımpaşa | 2 – 2 | Mersin İdmanyurdu | FT Satadim, Başakşehir, İstanbul |
| Sunday 17:00 | Sanharib Malki 62' (F); Adem Büyük 82' (F); Barış Başdaş (yellow card) 33'; Ryan Donk (yellow card) 42'; Adem Büyük (yellow card) 45' | Report | 34' (F) Tita; 45' (F) Tita; (yellow card) 36' Nihat Şahin; (yellow card) 50' Loret Sadiku; (yellow card) 67' Serkan Balcı; (yellow card) 90' Ricardo Pedriel | Attendance: 1.300; Referee: Mete Kalkavan |

| 20 September 2014 Round 3 | Mersin İdmanyurdu | 2 – 0 | Çaykur Rizespor | 5 Ocak Fatih Terim Stadium, Adana |
| Saturday, 20:00 | Servet Çetin 12' (H); Sinan Kaloğlu 82' (F); Abdul Khalili (yellow card) 57' | Report | (yellow card) 67' Giray Kaçar | Attendance: 750; Referee: Mustafa Kamil Abitoğlu |

| 29 September 2014 Round 4 | Kardemir Karabükspor | 0 – 2 | Mersin İdmanyurdu | N. Şeyhoğlu Stadium, Karabük |
| Monday, 18:00 | Abdou Razack Traoré (yellow card) 45' | Report | 29' (F) Loret Sadiku; 72' (F) Efe Özarslan; (yellow card) 70' Wederson; (yellow card) 85' Loret Sadiku; (yellow card) 88' Servet Çetin | Attendance: 1.000; Referee: Fırat Aydınus |

| 3 October 2014 Round 5 | Mersin İdmanyurdu | 2 – 1 | Bursaspor | Tevfik Sırrı Gür Stadium, Mersin |
| Friday, 20:00 | Servet Çetin, 33' (H); Sinan Kaloğlu 92' (F); Márkó Futács (yellow card) 15'; Wederson (yellow card) 18'; Welliton (yellow card) 77'; Murat Ceylan (yellow card) 78'; Efe Özarslan (yellow card) 88'; Güven Varol (yellow card) 90+1'; Oktay Delibalta (yellow card) 90+3'; Nihat Şahin (yellow card) 90+4' | Report | 94' (H) Serdar Aziz; (yellow card) 21' Serdar Aziz; (yellow card) 35' Ozan Tufan; (yellow card) 63' Fernandão; (yellow card) 88' Josué Pesqueira | Attendance: 7.500; Referee: Barış Şimşek |

| 19 October 2014 Round 6 | Trabzonspor | 3 – 1 | Mersin İdmanyurdu | Hüseyin Avni Aker Stadium, Trabzon |
| Sunday, 16:00 | Essaïd Belkalem 54' (H); Carl Medjani 79' (H); Óscar Cardozo 86' (H); Salih Dursun (yellow card) 63'; José Bosingwa (yellow card) 70' | Report | 71' (F) Oktay Delibalta; (yellow card) 25' Murat Ceylan; (yellow card) 35' Güven Varol; (red card) 57' Wederson; (yellow card) 86' Welliton | Attendance: 4.500; Referee: Tolga Özkalfa |

| 26 October 2014 Round 7 | Mersin İdmanyurdu | 4 – 2 | Eskişehirspor | Tevfik Sırrı Gür Stadium, Mersin |
| Sunday, 13:30 | Oktay Delibalta 40' (F); Oktay Delibalta 75' (F); Sinan Kaloğlu 94' (F); Murat Ceylan (red card) 60' | Report | 3' (H) Ömer Şişmanoğlu; 28' (pen.) Erkan Zengin; 79' (o.g.) Berkay Dabanlı; (yellow card) 30' Ömer Şişmanoğlu; (yellow card) 62' Ruud Boffin; (yellow card) 80' Ibrahim Sissoko; (yellow card) 85' Raheem Lawal | Attendance: 7.750; Referee: Ali Palabıyık |

| 2 November 2014 Round 8 | Gaziantepspor | 1 – 0 | Mersin İdmanyurdu | Kamil Ocak Stadium, Gaziantep |
| Sunday 13:30 | John Chibuike 64' (F); Chico (yellow card) 46'; John Chibuike (yellow card) 68' | Report | (yellow card) 48' Serkan Balcı; (yellow card) 69' Loret Sadiku | Attendance: 2.000; Referee: Fırat Aydınus |

| 8 November 2014 Round 9 | Mersin İdmanyurdu | 2 – 1 | Balıkesirspor | Tevfik Sırrı Gür Stadium, Mersin |
| Saturday, 14:30 | Welliton 16' (H); Oktay Delibalta 55' (F); Préjuce Nakoulma (yellow card) 17' | Report | 64' (F) Sercan Yıldırım; (yellow card) 54' Khalifa Jabbie | Attendance: 5.000; Referee: Abdulkadir Bitigen |

| 22 November 2014 Round 10 | Akhisar Belediyespor | 1 – 1 | Mersin İdmanyurdu | 19 Mayıs Stadium, Manisa |
| Saturday, 16:00 | Bilal Kısa 67' (H); Arnaud Djoum (yellow card) 87' | Report | 76' (F) Welliton; (yellow card) 63' Wederson | Attendance: 2.750; Referee: Mustafa Kamil Abitoğlu |

| 30 November 2014 Round 11 | Mersin İdmanyurdu | 2 – 0 | Sivasspor | Tevfik Sırrı Gür Stadium, Mersin |
| Sunday, 16:00 | Préjuce Nakoulma 57' (F); Sinan Kaloğlu 90' (F); Abdul Khalili (yellow card) 29'; Serkan Balcı (yellow card) 53' | Report | (yellow card) 86' Burhan Eşer | Attendance: 9.800; Referee: Mete Kalkavan |

| 6 December 2014 Round 12 | Torku Konyaspor | 2 – 0 | Mersin İdmanyurdu | Konya Büyükşehir Stadı, Konya |
| Saturday, 13:30 | Selim Ay 66' (H); Hasan Kabze 70' (F); Ali Çamdalı (yellow card) 49'; Djalma Campos (yellow card) 87' | Report | (yellow card) 42' Milan Mitrović; (red card) 76' Murat Ceylan | Attendance: 11.150; Referee: Mustafa Öğretmenoğlu |

| 14 December 2014 Round 13 | Mersin İdmanyurdu | 1 – 1 | SAİ Kayseri Erciyesspor | Tevfik Sırrı Gür Stadium, Mersin |
| Sunday, 16:00 | Márkó Futács 35' (F) | Report | 48' (F) Anıl Karaer; (yellow card) 42' Anıl Karaer; (yellow card) 77' Emre Öztürk | Attendance: 7.500; Referee: Halis Özkahya |

| 20 December 2014 Round 14 | Galatasaray | 3 – 2 | Mersin İdmanyurdu | Türk Telekom Arena, Istanbul |
| Saturday, 19:00 | Güven Varol 18' (o.g.); Burak Yılmaz 55' (pen.); Umut Bulut 79' (F); Alex Telles (yellow card) 14'; Wesley Sneijder (yellow card) 25'; Felipe Melo (yellow card) 44'; Sabri Sarıoğlu (yellow card) 45' | Report | 9' (F) Güven Varol; 27' (pen.) Milan Mitrović; (yellow card) 18' Milan Mitrović; (yellow card) 54' Nihat Şahin; (yellow card) 90+2' (red card) Tita | Attendance: 21.961; Referee: Fırat Aydınus |

| 27 December 2014 Round 15 | Fenerbahçe | 1 – 0 | Mersin İdmanyurdu | Şükrü Saracoğlu Stadium, Istanbul |
| Saturday, 19:00 | Mehmet Topal 31' (F); Mehmet Topal (yellow card) 18'; Caner Erkin (yellow card) 36'; Bruno Alves (yellow card) 62' | Report | (yellow card) 17' Serkan Balcı; (yellow card) 48' Efe Özarslan; (yellow card) 84' Nikolay Mihaylov | Attendance: 9.200; Referee: Bülent Yıldırım |

| 5 January 2015 Round 16 | Mersin İdmanyurdu | 1 – 1 | Gençlerbirliği | Tevfik Sırrı Gür Stadium, Mersin |
| Monday, 20:00 | Welliton 77' (H); Abdul Khalili (yellow card) 14'; Murat Ceylan (yellow card) 29'; Servet Çetin (yellow card) 66'; Welliton (yellow card) 87' | Report | 51' (F) Berat Tosun; (yellow card) 24' Jean-Jacques Gosso; (yellow card) 76' Doğa Kaya | Attendance: 5.500; Referee: İlker Meral |

| 24 January 2014 Round 17 | İstanbul Başakşehir | 2 – 2 | Mersin İdmanyurdu | FT Satadim, Başakşehir, İstanbul |
| Wednesday, 13:30 | Edin Višća 47' (F); Jérémy Perbet 87' (H); Semih Şentürk (yellow card) 16'; Mahmut Tekdemir (yellow card) 77' | Report | 5' (F) Sinan Kaloğlu; 75' (F) Mehmet Taş | Attendance: 600; Referee: Ali Palabıyık |

Sources: 2014–15 Süper Lig pages.

=== Second half ===
Mersin İdmanyurdu (MİY) 2014–15 Süper Lig season second half game reports is shown in the following table. Kick off times are in EET and EEST.

| 1 February 2015 Round 18 | Beşiktaş | 2 – 1 | Mersin İdmanyurdu | Ottoman Stadium, Sincan, Ankara |
| Sunday, 16:00 | Olcay Şahan 30' (F); Demba Ba 64' (F) | Report | 61' (F) Sinan Kaloğlu; (yellow card) 24' Mehmet Taş | Attendance: 17.000; Referee: Mete Kalkavan |

| 8 February 2015 Round 19 | Mersin İdmanyurdu | 6 – 2 | Kasımpaşa | Tevfik Sırrı Gür Stadium, Mersin |
| Sunday, 13:00 | Welliton 42' (F); Abdul Khalili 57' (F); Welliton 75' (F); Milan Mitrović 84' (pen.); Ricardo Pedriel 88' (F); Welliton 90' (F); Loret Sadiku (yellow card) 72'; Welliton (yellow card) 88'; Mehmet Taş (yellow card) 89' | Report | 62' (F) Veysel Sarı; 72' (F) Ryan Babel; (yellow card) 41' Veysel Sarı; (yellow card) 70' Sanharib Malki; (yellow card) 83' İlhan Eker | Attendance: 6.500; Referee: Mustafa Kamil Abitoğlu |

| 15 February 2015 Round 20 | Çaykur Rizespor | 0 – 4 | Mersin İdmanyurdu | New Rize City Stadium, Rize |
| Sunday, 13:00 | Giray Kaçar (yellow card) 85' | Report | 7' (F) Márkó Futács; 50' (F) Préjuce Nakoulma; 86' (F) Márkó Futács; 90+1' (F) Préjuce Nakoulma; (yellow card) 32' Márkó Futács; (yellow card) 60' Ricardo Pedriel; (yellow card) 67' Mehmet Taş; (yellow card) 90+1' Préjuce Nakoulma | Attendance: 3.500; Referee: İlker Meral |

| 22 February 2015 Round 21 | Mersin İdmanyurdu | 2 – 1 | Kardemir Karabükspor | Tevfik Sırrı Gür Stadium, Mersin |
| Sunday, 13:00 | Servet Çetin 26' (H); Milan Mitrović 67' (pen.) | Report | 10' (F) Musa Çağıran; (yellow card) 6' Abdou Razack Traoré; (yellow card) 52' Emre Özkan; (yellow card) 75' Bertul Kocabaş | Attendance: 7.500; Referee: Halis Özkahya |

| 1 March 2015 Round 22 | Bursaspor | 2 – 1 | Mersin İdmanyurdu | Atatürk Stadium, Bursa |
| Sunday, 16:00 | Fernandão 59' (pen.); Renato Civelli 76' (H); Harun Tekin (red card) 17' | Report | 19' (F) Milan Mitrović; (yellow card) 57' Préjuce Nakoulma; (yellow card) 58' Welliton; (yellow card) 89' Wederson | Attendance: 10.000; Referee: Mete Kalkavan |

| 9 March 2015 Round 23 | Mersin İdmanyurdu | 1 – 5 | Trabzonspor | Tevfik Sırrı Gür Stadium, Mersin |
| Monday, 20:00 | Serol Demirhan 69' (o.g.); Sinan Kaloğlu 81' (F); Servet Çetin (yellow card) 35'; Welliton (yellow card) 38'; Loret Sadiku (yellow card) 62'; Murat Ceylan (yellow card) 67' | Report | 30' (F) Mehmet Ekici; 44' (H) Sefa Yılmaz; 56' (H) Sefa Yılmaz; 90+1' (F) Óscar Cardozo; (yellow card) 73' José Bosingwa | Attendance: 8.000; Referee: Ali Palabıyık |

| 15 March 2015 Round 24 | Eskişehirspor | 2 – 0 | Mersin İdmanyurdu | Atatürk Stadium, Eskişehir |
| Sunday, 14:00 | Sezer Öztürk 25' (F); Ömer Şişmanoğlu 35' (F); Kamil Çörekçi (yellow card) 16' | Report | (yellow card) 37' Serkan Yanık; (yellow card) 84' Efe Özarslan | Attendance: 8.300; Referee: Hüseyin Göçek |

| 21 March 2015 Round 25 | Mersin İdmanyurdu | 0 – 1 | Gaziantepspor | Tevfik Sırrı Gür Stadium, Mersin |
| Saturday, 13:30 | Tita (yellow card) 14'; Wederson (yellow card) 40'; Milan Mitrović (yellow card) 57'; Murat Ceylan (yellow card) 65'; Serkan Balcı (yellow card) post-match' | Report | 36' (F) Erdem Şen; (yellow card) 72' Chico | Attendance: 4.500; Referee: Yunus Yıldırım |

| 4 April 2015 Round 26 | Balıkesirspor | 1 – 3 | Mersin İdmanyurdu | Atatürk Stadium, Balıkesir |
| Saturday, 13:30 | Ante Kulušić 90+2' (H) | Report | 30' (F) Abdul Khalili; 58' (F) Welliton; 76' (F) Préjuce Nakoulma; (yellow card) 44' Ricardo Pedriel; (yellow card) 61' Serkan Balcı | Attendance: 3.000; Referee: Bülent Yıldırım |

| 20 April 2015 Round 27 | Mersin İdmanyurdu | 1 – 1 | Akhisar Belediyespor | Mersin Stadium, Mersin |
| Monday, 20:00 | Wederson 55' (pen.); Oktay Delibalta (yellow card) 20' | Report | 90+4' (F) Bilal Kısa; (yellow card) 6' Orhan Taşdelen; (yellow card) 27' İsmail Konuk; (yellow card) 55' Oğuz Dağlaroğlu; (yellow card) 55' Bilal Kısa | Attendance: 6.000; Referee: Özgür Yankaya |

| 24 April 2015 Round 28 | Medicana Sivasspor | 1 – 2 | Mersin İdmanyurdu | 4 Eylül Stadium, Sivas |
| Friday, 20:00 | Aatif Chahechouhe 67' (pen.); Adem Koçak (yellow card) 25' | Report | 90' (F) Sinan Kaloğlu; 90+3' (F) Márkó Futács | Attendance: 5.500; Referee: Barış Şimşek |

| 2 May 2015 Round 29 | Mersin İdmanyurdu | 3 – 1 | Torku Konyaspor | Mersin Stadium, Mersin |
| Saturday, 16:00 | Welliton 4' (F); Préjuce Nakoulma 10' (F); Wederson 17' (F); Welliton (yellow card) 54'; Murat Ceylan (yellow card) 76'; Márkó Futács (yellow card) 89'; Muammer Yıldırım (yellow card) 89' | Report | 7' (F) Dimitar Rangelov; (yellow card) 38' Elvis Kokalović | Attendance: 3.000; Referee: Koray Gençerler |

| 8 May 2015 Round 30 | SAİ Kayseri Erciyesspor | 2 – 2 | Mersin İdmanyurdu | Kadir Has Stadium, Kayseri |
| Friday, 20:00 | Oğulcan Çağlayan 43' (F); Jacques Zoua 49' (F); Yasin Pehlivan (yellow card) 33'; Ethem Pülgir (yellow card) 68'; Mehmet Akgün (yellow card) 80'; Pape Diakhaté (red card) 90+1'; Jacques Zoua (yellow card) post-match' | Report | 52' (pen.) Wederson; 90' (F) Loret Sadiku | Attendance: 1.850; Referee: Fırat Aydınus |

| 12 May 2015 Round 31 | Mersin İdmanyurdu | 0 – 1 | Galatasaray | Mersin Stadium, Mersin |
| Tuesday, 19:45 | Oktay Delibalta (yellow card) 22' | Report | 16' (F) Yasin Öztekin; (yellow card) 44' Hakan Balta; (yellow card) 62' Felipe Melo; (yellow card) 86' Wesley Sneijder; (yellow card) 90+2' Fernando Muslera | Attendance: 16.500; Referee: Ali Palabıyık |

| 17 May 2015 Round 32 | Mersin İdmanyurdu | 0 – 1 | Fenerbahçe | Mersin Stadium, Mersin |
| Sunday, 20:00 | Muammer Yıldırım (red card) 50'; Wederson (yellow card) 55'; Serkan Balcı (yellow card) 64' | Report | 90+2' (F) Emre Belözoğlu; (yellow card) 5' Gökhan Gönül; (yellow card) 66' Bruno Alves | Attendance: 15.000; Referee: Cüneyt Çakır |

| 22 May 2015 Round 33 | Gençlerbirliği | 1 – 2 | Mersin İdmanyurdu | 19 Mayıs Stadium, Ankara |
| Friday, 20:00 | İrfan Kahveci 37' (F); Radosav Petrović (yellow card) 45' | Report | 60' (F) Welliton; 79' (F) Préjuce Nakoulma; (yellow card) 44' Murat Ceylan; (yellow card) 45' Wederson; (yellow card) 66' Abdul Khalili; (yellow card) 82' Tita; (yellow card) 90+1' Nikolay Mihaylov | Attendance: 800; Referee: Onur Karabaş |

| 30 May 2015 Round 34 | Mersin İdmanyurdu | 2 – 2 | İstanbul Başakşehir | Mersin Stadium, Mersin |
| Saturday, 19:00 | Welliton 50' (F); Oktay Delibalta 55' (F); Márkó Futács (yellow card) 29'; Serkan Balcı (yellow card) 60'; Murat Ceylan (yellow card) 81' (red card) | Report | 80' (F) Doka Madureira; 87' (F) Edin Višća; (yellow card) 35' Mossoró; (yellow card) 78' Ferhat Öztorun | Attendance: 1.750 (Tribune banning); Referee: Mete Kalkavan |

Sources: 2014–15 Süper Lig pages.

== 2014–15 Turkish Cup participation ==
2014–15 Turkish Cup was played for 53rd time as Ziraat Türkiye Kupası for sponsorship reasons. The Cup was played by 156 teams in four stages. In the first stage 1 preliminary and 3 elimination rounds were played in one-leg elimination system. In the second stage 16 teams played in eight groups (A to H) in a two-leg round-robin system. In the third stage, first and second ranked teams in each group played 1/8 games in one-leg elimination system at first ranked team's home. In the fourth stage quarterfinals and semifinals were played in two-leg elimination system, second games being played at higher ranked team's home. Final was played in one game system in a neutral venue. Mersin İdmanyurdu took place in the Cup starting from second elimination round and promoted to group stage. MİY took place in Group C and finished second. In the third stage MİY was paired with Karabükspor and promoted after extra time. In quarterfinals, Fenerbahçe was drawn as opponents, second game being played in opponents' grounds. MİY was eliminated by Fenerbahçe who was eliminated by Bursaspor at semifinals. Galatasaray won the Cup for 16th time.

=== Cup track ===
The drawings and results Mersin İdmanyurdu (MİY) followed in 2014–15 Turkish Cup are shown in the following table.

| Round | Own League | Opponent's League | Opponent | Away | Home | Result |
|---|---|---|---|---|---|---|
| Round 2 | Süper Lig | Third League | Kemer Tekirovaspor | – | 3–0 | Promoted |
| Round 3 | Süper Lig | Second League | Hatayspor | – | 2–0 | Promoted |
| Group Stage | Süper Lig | Second League | Centone Karagümrük | 0–1 | 3–0 | |
| Group Stage | Süper Lig | Süper Lig | Bursaspor | 1–1 | 0–5 | |
| Group Stage | Süper Lig | First League | Samsunspor | 1–1 | 3–1 | Promoted |
| Round of 16 | Süper Lig | Süper Lig | Kardemir Karabükspor | 4–2 | – | Promoted |
| Q-Finals | Süper Lig | Süper Lig | Fenerbahçe | 1–4 | 1–2 | Eliminated |

Note: In the above table 'Score' shows For and Against goals whether the match played at home or not.

=== Game details ===
Mersin İdmanyurdu (MİY) 2014–15 Turkish Cup game reports is shown in the following table. Kick off times are in EET and EEST.

| 24 September 2014 Round 2 | Mersin İdmanyurdu | 3 – 0 | Kemer Tekirovaspor | Tarsus Stadium, Tarsus, Mersin |
| Wednesday, 18:00 | Welliton 19' (F); Eren Tozlu 38' (H); Milan Mitrović 75' (F) | Report | (yellow card) 49' Mehmet Kaya; (yellow card) 84' (red card) Sergen Yılmaz | Referee: Mustafa Kürşad Filiz |

| 30 October 2014 Round 3 | Mersin İdmanyurdu | 2 – 0 | Hatayspor | Tevfik Sırrı Gür Stadium, Mersin |
| Thursday, 19:00 | Milan Mitrović 15' (H); Güven Varol 89' (F); Milan Mitrović (yellow card) 35'; Serol Demirhan (yellow card) 52'; Serkan Yanık (yellow card) 70' | Report | (yellow card) 6' Emin Altunay | Referee: Levent Aktan |

| 10 December 2014 Group C R1 | Bursaspor | 1 – 1 | Mersin İdmanyurdu | Atatürk Stadium, Bursa |
| Wednesday, 18:00 | Şamil Çinaz 20' (H) | Report | 23' (F) Güven Varol; (yellow card) 36' Ricardo Pedriel; (yellow card) 75' Serkan Yanık; (red card) 89' Loret Sadiku; (yellow card) 90' Efe Halil Özarslan; (yellow card) 90' Melih Gökçek (Tita); (yellow card) 90+1' Nikolay Mihaylov | Referee: Özgüç Türkalp |

| 17 December 2014 Group C R2 | Mersin İdmanyurdu | 3 – 1 | Samsunspor | Tevfik Sırrı Gür Stadium, Mersin |
| Wednesday, 14:15 | Serol Demirhan 25' (F); Güven Varol 35' (F); Márkó Futács 90+2' (F); Márkó Futács (yellow card) 60'; Serol Demirhan (yellow card) 74' | Report | 31' (F) Safa Serbest; (yellow card) 69' Zafer Özden; (yellow card) 79' Halil İbrahim Pekşen | Referee: Yunus Yıldırım |

| 23 December 2014 Group C R3 | Centone Karagümrük | 1 – 0 | Mersin İdmanyurdu | Vefa Stadium, Karagümrük, Istanbul |
| Tuesday, 13:00 | Mertcan Aktaş 29' (F); Erdinç Çepoğlu (yellow card) 8'; Halil Uysal (yellow card) 90+2' | Report | (yellow card) 32' Welliton; (yellow card) 90+2' Serkan Yanık | Referee: Hüseyin Sabancı |

| 1 January 2015 Group C R4 | Mersin İdmanyurdu | 3 – 0 | Centone Karagümrük | Tevfik Sırrı Gür Stadium, Mersin |
| Thursday, 15:30 | Welliton 46' (F); Ricardo Pedriel 50' (H); Güven Varol 62' (H); Welliton (yellow card) 66'; Murat Ceylan (yellow card) 90+1' | Report | (yellow card) 15' Erhan Kara; (yellow card) 66' Kaan Güdü; (yellow card) 78' Berke Bıyık; (yellow card) 90+1' Nihat Yılmaz | Referee: Yunus Yıldırım |

| 27 January 2015 Group C R5 | Mersin İdmanyurdu | 0 – 5 | Bursaspor | Tevfik Sırrı Gür Stadium, Mersin |
| Tuesday, 16:00 | Abdul Khalili (yellow card) 45'; Ricardo Pedriel (yellow card) 45'; Efe Özarslan (yellow card) 50'; Márkó Futács (yellow card) 90' | Report | 35' (F) Cédric Bakambu; 51' (F) Samuel Holmén; 54' (F) Cédric Bakambu; 74' (F) Bakaye Traoré; 90+1' (F) Cédric Bakambu; (yellow card) 58' Emre Taşdemir; (yellow card) 77' Renato Civelli | Referee: Süleyman Abay |

| 4 February 2015 Group C R6 | Samsunspor | 1 – 1 | Mersin İdmanyurdu | 19 Mayıs Stadium, Samsun |
| Wednesday, 16:00 | Burhan Arman 13' (F); Erdi Dikmen (yellow card) 37'; Zafer Özden (yellow card) 50'; Tuna Üzümcü (yellow card) 65'; Oğuzhan Bulgan (yellow card) 70' | Report | 90' (F) Ricardo Pedriel; (yellow card) 29' Serkan Yanık; (yellow card) 60' Márkó Futács; (yellow card) 79' Abdul Khalili | Referee: Hakan Ceylan |

| 11 February 2015 Round 1/16 | Kardemir Karabükspor | 2 – 4 | Mersin İdmanyurdu | N. Şeyoğlu Stadium, Karabük |
| Wednesday, 14:00 | Domi Kumbela 2' (H); Ahmet İlhan Özek 15' (F); Erkan Kaş (yellow card) 33'; Murat Akça (yellow card) 116' | (a.e.t.); Report | 3' (F) Ricardo Pedriel; 69' (F) Tita; 93' (F) Ricardo Pedriel; 113' (F) Sinan Kaloğlu; (yellow card) 19' Márkó Futács; (yellow card) 61' Efe Özarslan; (yellow card) 73' Ricardo Pedriel; (yellow card) 105' Abdul Khalili; (yellow card) 116' Tita | Referee: Mustafa İlker Coşkun |

| 4 March 2015 QF Leg 1 | Mersin İdmanyurdu | 1 – 2 | Fenerbahçe | Tevfik Sırrı Gür Stadium, Mersin |
| Wednesday, 20:30 | Welliton 74' (F); Serkan Yanık (yellow card) 29' | Report | 43' (F) Diego Ribas; 44' (F) Moussa Sow; (yellow card) 34' Serdar Kesimal; (yellow card) 90' Bekir İrtegün | Attendance: 9.200; Referee: Yunus Yıldırım |

| 16 April 2015 QF Leg 2 | Fenerbahçe | 4 – 1 | Mersin İdmanyurdu | Ş. Saracoğlu Stadium, Istanbul |
| Thursday, 19:45 | Dirk Kuijt 6' (F); Dirk Kuijt 30' (F); Hasan Ali Kaldırım 48' (F); Caner Erkin 61' (F); Caner Erkin (yellow card) 55' | Report | 71' (H) Márkó Futács; (red card) 29' Efe Özarslan; (yellow card) 30' Tita | Attendance: 3.500; Referee: Mustafa İlker Coşkun |

Source: 2014–15 Turkish Cup (Ziraat Türkiye Kupası) official TFF page. Attendance for quarterfinals from ntvspor.

== Management ==
President Ali Kahramanlı continued in his position which he held in 2008. Club address was: Palmiye Mah. Adnan Menders Bl. 1204 Sk. Onur Ap. K.2 D.3 Yenişehir/Mersin.

=== Club management ===
The incumbent board of management was elected on 27 October 2014. The division of labor in the board was as follows (as of January 2015): Ali Kahrahramanlı (President), Senan İdin (Deputy President), Beşir Acar General Secretary), Sedat Aydöner (financial and juridical affairs), Hikmet Kaya and Ahmet Turan Serttaş (football division and spokesmen), Apti Öztürk and Şerafettin Kadooğlu (amateur divisions), Sabri Tekli and Ufuk Maya (financial resources and ethics), Ayhan Erdem and Metin Yıldıran (facilities and institutionalization). The administrative staff were as follows: Mesut Bilir (General Coordinator), Murat Öğ (General Director), Duygu Bilir (Accreditation), Özcan Ulusoy (accounting), Rıfkı Çınar and Barış Köksal (public relations), Mustafa Kaya (security), Ökkeş Aybar (transportation).

=== Coaching team ===
Since 3 June 2014 Rıza Çalımbay has been the Technical Director (meaning "head coach" in Turkey). Other technical staff includes: Kerem Atılmaz (Administrative Director), Bülent Albayrak, Kenan Oktay and Ayhan Tenbeloğolu (Trainers), M. Cengiz Birgen (Goalkeeper Trainer), Burhan Kılıç (Statisticial Analyzer), Serkan Damla (General Manager), Ahmet Edremit (Physician), Serkan Sağlık (Physiotherapist), Ersoy Şenel, Oktay Baş and Abdülkadir Topal (Masseurs), Abdülkadir Reşiti and Caner Çakmak (Translators).

| Nat | Head coach | Period | Pl | W | D | L | Notes |
|---|---|---|---|---|---|---|---|
| (Turkey) | Rıza Çalımbay | 03.06.2014 – 31.05.2014 | 45 | 18 | 10 | 17 | Contract ended at the end of the season. |

Note: Only official games were included.

== 2014–15 squad ==
Appearances, goals and cards count for 2014–15 Süper Lig and Türkiye Kupası (2014–15 Turkish Cup) games. Only the players who appeared in game rosters were included. Player's are listed in order of appearance. MİY could not signed with new players in the mid-season, because FIFA decided on two season transfer ban for MİY due to termination of the contract of the MİY's former player David Bičík. The ban was applied for 2015 Winter and Summer transfer seasons.

| O | N | Nat | Name | Birth | Born | Pos | LA | LG | CA | CG | TA | TG | Booked | Sent off (straight red) | ← Season Notes → |
|---|---|---|---|---|---|---|---|---|---|---|---|---|---|---|---|
| 1 | 1 | (Turkey) | Nihat Şahin | 15 Sep 1989 | İzmir | GK | 22 | | 1 | | 23 | | 4 | | 2014 ST Sivasspor. |
| 2 | 30 | (Turkey) | Serkan Balcı | 22 Aug 1983 | Nazilli | DF | 25 | | 2 | | 27 | | 9 | | 2014 ST Antalyaspor. |
| 3 | 76 | (Turkey) | Servet Çetin | 17 Mar 1981 | Tuzluca | DF | 33 | 3 | | | 33 | 3 | 3 | | 2014 ST Eskişehirspor. |
| 4 | 44 | (Turkey) | Mehmet Sığırcı | 24 Feb 1993 | Güngören | DF | 1 | | 1 | | 2 | | 1 | | 2014 ST Hatayspor. |
| 5 | 6 | (Brazil) | Wederson | 22 Jul 1981 | Campos | DF | 32 | 3 | | | 32 | 3 | 7 | 2 | 2014 ST Antalyaspor. |
| 6 | 3 | (Kosovo) | Loret Sadiku | 28 Jul 1991 | Pristina | DF | 26 | 2 | 6 | | 32 | 2 | 5 | 1 | 2014 ST Helsingborg. |
| 7 | 5 | (Turkey) | Murat Ceylan | 2 Mar 1988 | Gaziantep | MF | 31 | | 8 | | 39 | | 8 | 3 | → previous season. |
| 8 | 13 | (Turkey) | Oktay Delibalta | 27 Oct 1985 | Samsun | MF | 19 | 5 | 4 | | 23 | 5 | 3 | | 2014 ST Gençlerbirliği. |
| 9 | 58 | (Bolivia) | Ricardo Pedriel | 19 Jan 1987 | Santa Cruz | FW | 25 | 1 | 10 | 4 | 35 | 5 | 6 | | 2014 ST Club Bolívar. |
| 10 | 22 | (Burkina Faso) | Préjuce Nakoulma | 21 Apr 1987 | Ouaga | FW | 31 | 6 | 3 | | 34 | 6 | 3 | | 2014 ST Górnik Zabrze. |
| 11 | 9 | (Hungary) | Márkó Futács | 22 Feb 1990 | Budapest | FW | 26 | 4 | 9 | 2 | 35 | 6 | 8 | | 2014 ST Leicester City. |
| 12 | 23 | (Turkey) | Günay Güvenç | 25 Jun 1991 | Neu-Ulm | GK | | | | | | | | | 2014 SL Beşiktaş |
| 13 | 91 | (Turkey) | Mehmet Taş | 20 Mar 1991 | Mersin | DF | 8 | 1 | 9 | | 17 | 1 | 4 | | 2014 ST Nazilli Belediye. |
| 14 | 33 | (Turkey) | Efe Özarslan | 29 Mar 1990 | Mersin | DF | 15 | 1 | 10 | | 25 | 1 | 6 | 1 | → previous season. |
| 15 | 55 | (Sweden) | Abdul Khalili | 7 Jun 1992 | Raus, Se | MF | 30 | 2 | 7 | | 37 | 2 | 8 | | 2014 ST Helsingborg. |
| 16 | 10 | (Brazil) | Tita | 20 Jul 1981 | Rio de J. | FW | 24 | 2 | 8 | 1 | 32 | 3 | 5 | | 2014 ST Antalyaspor. |
| 17 | 11 | (Turkey) | Sinan Kaloğlu | 10 Jun 1981 | Ovacık | FW | 24 | 8 | 4 | 1 | 28 | 9 | | | → previous season. |
| 18 | 73 | (Brazil) | Welliton | 22 Oct 1986 | Conceição | FW | 30 | 10 | 4 | 3 | 34 | 13 | 9 | | 2014 ST Spartak Moscow. |
| 19 | 21 | (Turkey) | Muammer Yıldırım | 14 Sep 1990 | Eğil | GK | 7 | | 2 | | 9 | | 1 | 1 | → previous season. |
| 20 | 72 | (Turkey) | Nurullah Kaya | 20 Jul 1986 | Batman | MF | 3 | | 5 | | 8 | | | | → previous season. |
| 21 | 7 | (Turkey) | Güven Varol | 2 Jun 1981 | Adapazarı | MF | 28 | 2 | 11 | 4 | 39 | 6 | 3 | | → previous season. |
| 22 | 15 | (Serbia) | Milan Mitrović | 2 Jul 1988 | Prokuplje | DF | 24 | 4 | 9 | 2 | 33 | 6 | 5 | | → previous season. |
| 23 | 63 | (Bulgaria) | Nikolay Mihaylov | 28 Jun 1988 | Sofia | GK | 6 | | 8 | | 14 | | 3 | | 2014 ST Verona. |
| 24 | 28 | (Turkey) | Eren Tozlu | 27 Dec 1990 | Giresun | FW | 1 | | 6 | 1 | 7 | 1 | | | → previous season. |
| 25 | 88 | (Turkey) | Serol Demirhan | 5 Dec 1988 | Altındağ | DF | 1 | | 10 | 1 | 11 | 1 | 2 | | 2014 ST Eskişehirspor. |
| 26 | 8 | (Turkey) | Mahmut Temür | 8 Oct 1989 | Cologne | MF | | | 3 | | 3 | | | | → previous season. |
| 27 | 99 | (Turkey) | Cem Sultan | 27 Feb 1991 | İstanbul | FW | | | 1 | | 1 | | | | → previous season. |
| 28 | 77 | (Turkey) | Serkan Yanık | 2 Apr 1987 | Troyes | DF | 4 | | 8 | | 12 | | 6 | | → previous season. |
| 29 | 42 | (Turkey) | Berkan Afşarlı | 1 Mar 1991 | Lindau | MF | | | 2 | | 2 | | | | → previous season |
| 30 | 17 | (Turkey) | Adem Güven | 11 Sep 1985 | Kulu | DF | 1 | | 2 | | 3 | | | | → previous season. |
| 31 | 47 | (Turkey) | Tekin Oğrak | 13 Apr 1994 | Nusaybin | FW | | | | | | | | | First time professional. |
| 32 | 95 | (Turkey) | Hasan Daş | 6 Jan 1995 | Mersin | GK | | | | | | | | | First time professional. |

Sources: TFF club page and maçkolik team page.

== U-21 and U-19 teams ==
Mersin İdmanyurdu U-21 team participated in U21 League Süper Lig and U19 team in Elite U19 League.

== See also ==
- Football in Turkey
