= Oğuz Dağlaroğlu =

Turkish footballer

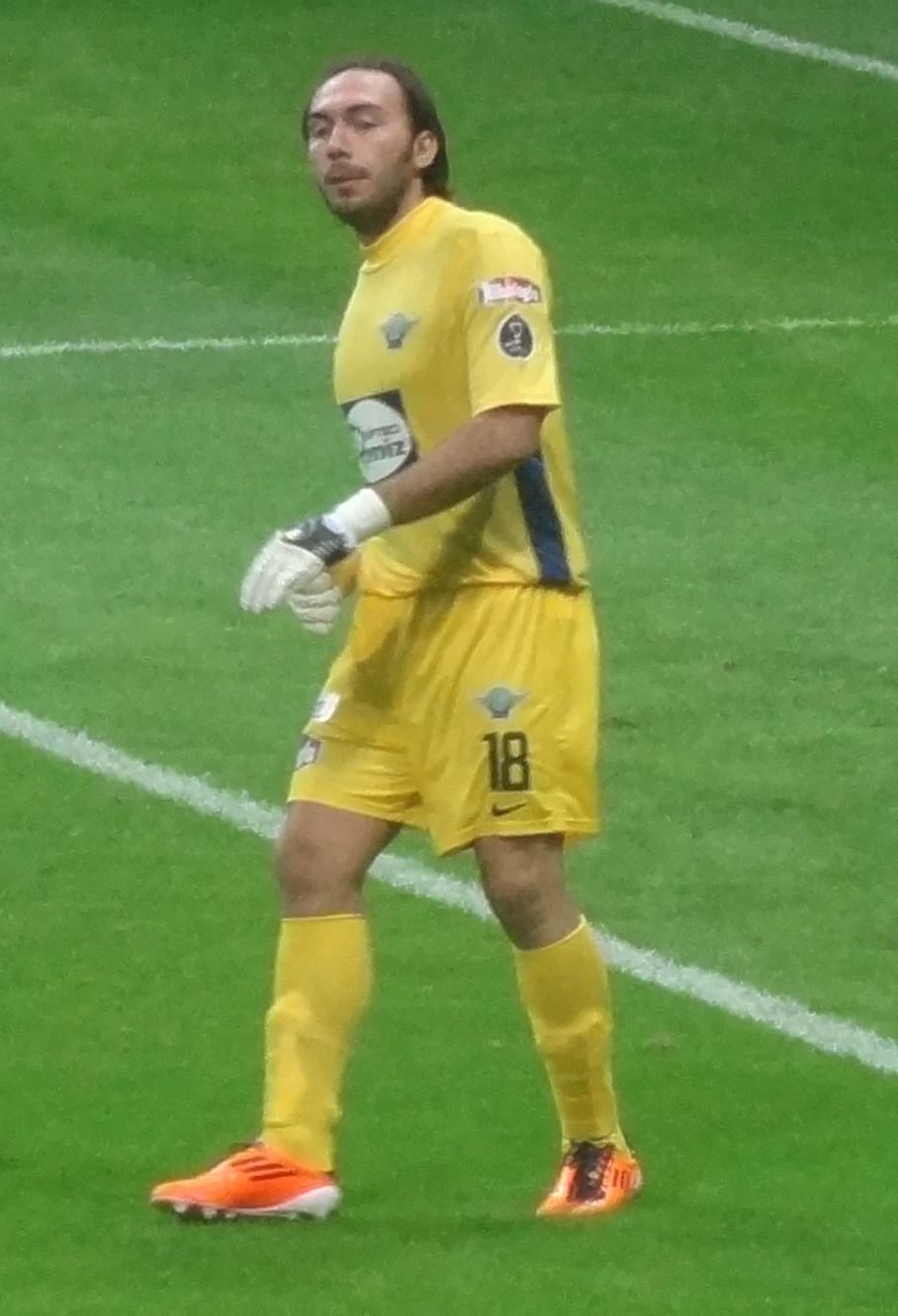

Personal information
- Full name: Oğuz Dağlaroğlu
- Date of birth: 18 August 1979 (age 47)
- Place of birth: Istanbul, Turkey
- Height: 1.83 m (6 ft 0 in)
- Position: Goalkeeper

Youth career
- 1994–1999: Fenerbahçe PAF

Senior career*
Years	Team	Apps	(Gls)
1999–2003	Fenerbahçe	17	(0)
2003–2005	İstanbulspor	58	(0)
2005	Diyarbakırspor	4	(0)
2006	Sivasspor	2	(0)
2006–2008	Gaziantepspor	16	(0)
2008–2009	Şanlıurfaspor	8	(0)
2009–2010	Kartalspor	20	(0)
2010–2011	Tavşanlı Linyitspor	31	(0)
2011–2015	Akhisar Belediyespor	114	(0)
2015–2016	Adana Demirspor	14	(0)
2016	Sarıyer	18	(0)

International career
2001	Turkey U21	1	(0)
1997	Turkey U18	2	(0)
1997	Turkey U17	5	(0)
- * Club domestic league appearances and goals as of 10 January 2016

Oğuz Dağlaroğlu (born 18 August 1979 in Istanbul) is a Turkish professional footballer who last played as a goalkeeper for Turkish club Sarıyer.
