= Serkan Yanık =

Turkish professional footballer (born 1987)

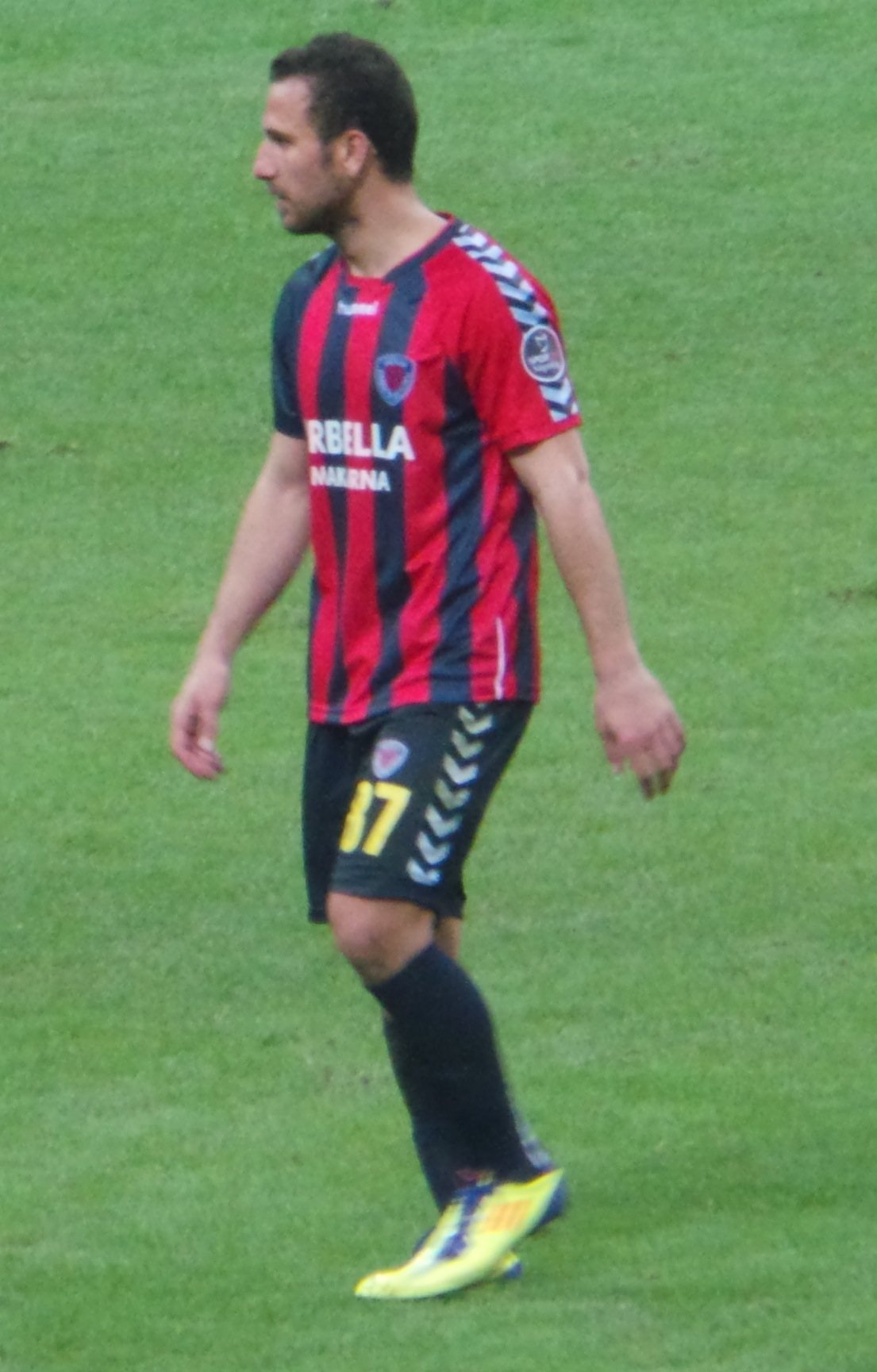

Personal information
- Full name: Serkan Yanık
- Date of birth: April 2, 1987 (age 39)
- Place of birth: Troyes, France
- Height: 1.76 m (5 ft 9 1/2 in)
- Positions: Center back; right back

Senior career*
| Years | Team | Apps | (Gls) |
| 2005–2007 | Stade Reims | 2 | (0) |
| 2007–2009 | Kocaelispor | 32 | (0) |
| 2009–2012 | Bucaspor | 68 | (0) |
| 2012–2013 | Mersin İdmanyurdu | 25 | (0) |
| 2013 | Gençlerbirliği | 7 | (0) |
| 2014–2015 | Mersin İdmanyurdu | 6 | (0) |
| 2015–2016 | Gaziantep BB | 27 | (1) |
| 2016–2017 | Adana Demirspor | 21 | (2) |
| 2017 | Giresunspor | 0 | (0) |
- * Club domestic league appearances and goals as of 24 July 2017

Serkan Yanık (born 2 April 1987) is a Turkish professional footballer who last played as a right back for Giresunspor in the TFF First League.

== Club career ==
Yanık, who was born in France, began his career with French club Stade Reims. He was transferred to Kocaelispor in 2007. Bucaspor acquired the right back in 2009, where he finished runners-up for the TFF First League title in 2009–10.
