= Murat Ceylan =

Turkish footballer (born 1988)

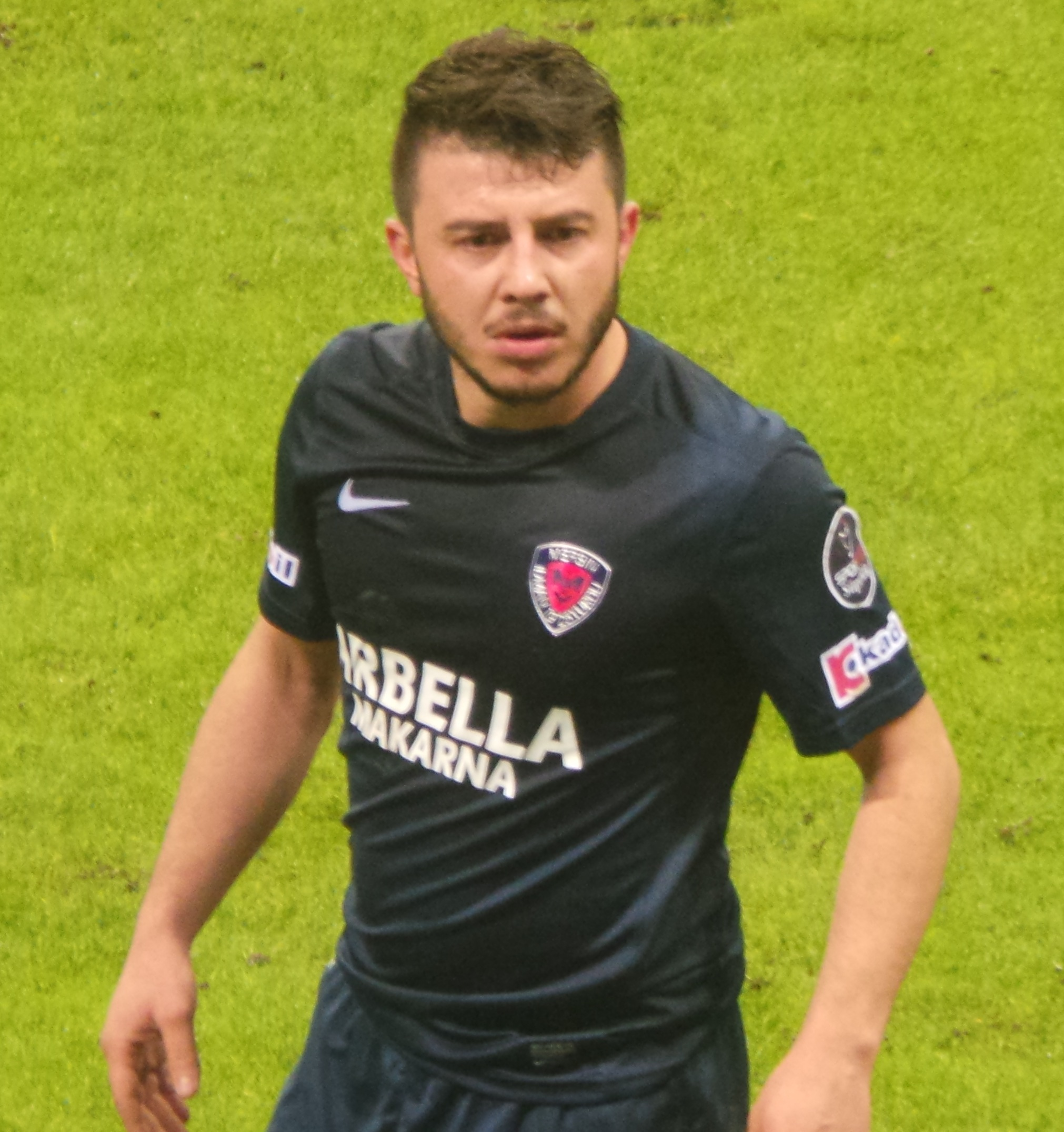

Personal information
- Date of birth: 2 March 1988 (age 38)
- Place of birth: Gaziantep, Turkey
- Height: 1.68 m (5 ft 6 in)
- Position: Defensive midfielder

Youth career
- 2002–2004: Gaziantep B.B.
- 2004–2005: Gaziantepspor

Senior career*
Years	Team	Apps	(Gls)
2004–2012	Gaziantepspor	106	(3)
2005–2006	→ Gaskispor (loan)	40	(1)
2012	→ Samsunspor (loan)	14	(0)
2012–2016	Mersin İdmanyurdu	78	(1)
2016–2018	Gaziantep B.B.	47	(0)
2018–2019	Fatih Karagümrük	12	(0)
2019–2021	Elazığspor	37	(1)
2021	Erbaaspor	3	(0)

International career
2004	Turkey U17	1	(0)
2007	Turkey U19	7	(1)
2008–2010	Turkey U21	11	(0)
2011	Turkey A2	2	(0)
- * Club domestic league appearances and goals

Murat Ceylan (born 2 March 1988) is a Turkish former footballer.

== Life and career ==
Ceylan was born in Gaziantep, Turkey. He began his career with local club Gaziantep Büyükşehir Belediyespor in 2002, eventually moving to cross-town rivals Gaziantepspor in 2004. Ceylan made his debut that same season, against Akçaabat Sebatspor, playing two matches in total. However, he spent the majority of the season in the youth leagues, making 27 appearances. He was loaned half way through the 2005-06 season to another Gaziantep based club, Gaskispor. He returned to Gaziantespor at the start of the 2007-08 season. He was linked with Galatasaray at the end of the 2009-10 season, but a move never materialized.

On the last day of the January transfer market 2019, Ceylan was one of 22 players on two hours, that signed for Turkish club Elazığspor. had been placed under a transfer embargo but managed to negotiate it with the Turkish FA, leading to them going on a mad spree of signing and registering a load of players despite not even having a permanent manager in place. In just two hours, they managed to snap up a record 22 players - 12 coming in on permanent contracts and a further 10 joining on loan deals until the end of the season.

== International career ==
Ceylan was first called up to the Turkey U-17 squad in September 2004 for two matches against the Bulgaria U-17s, but was not capped. He earned his first cap for the U-17 squad in a match against Italy on 22 December 2004. He has been capped for the U-19 team and for the Turkey national under-21 football team.

== Career statistics ==
=== Club ===
As of 22 December 2014

Club	Season	League			Cup		Total	
Club	Season	Division	Apps	Goals	Apps	Goals	Apps	Goals
Mersin İdmanyurdu	2014–15	Süper Lig	12	0	2	0	14	0
Career total			0	0	0	0	0	0
