= Ulaş Güler =

Turkish footballer

Personal information
- Full name: Ulaş Güler
- Date of birth: April 8, 1980 (age 46)
- Place of birth: Aydin, Turkey
- Height: 1.80 m (5 ft 11 in)
- Position: Goalkeeper

Team information
- Current team: Aydinspor

Youth career
- Işıklı Demirspor
- Aydinspor

Senior career*
Years	Team	Apps	(Gls)
1999–2003	Muğlaspor		
2003–2006	Marmaris Belediye		
2006–2010	Gençlerbirliği	1	(0)
2008–2009	→ Hacettepe (loan)	13	(0)
2011–2012	Tavşanlı Linyitspor	11	(0)
2012–2013	Giresunspor	4	(0)
2013–2014	Gölbaşıspor	21	(0)
2014–2015	Keçiörengücü	24	(0)
2015–	Aydinspor	0	(0)
- * Club domestic league appearances and goals as of 20 August 2015

Ulaş Güler (born April 8, 1980) is a Turkish footballer. He currently plays for Aydinspor.
