= Efe Özarslan =

Turkish footballer

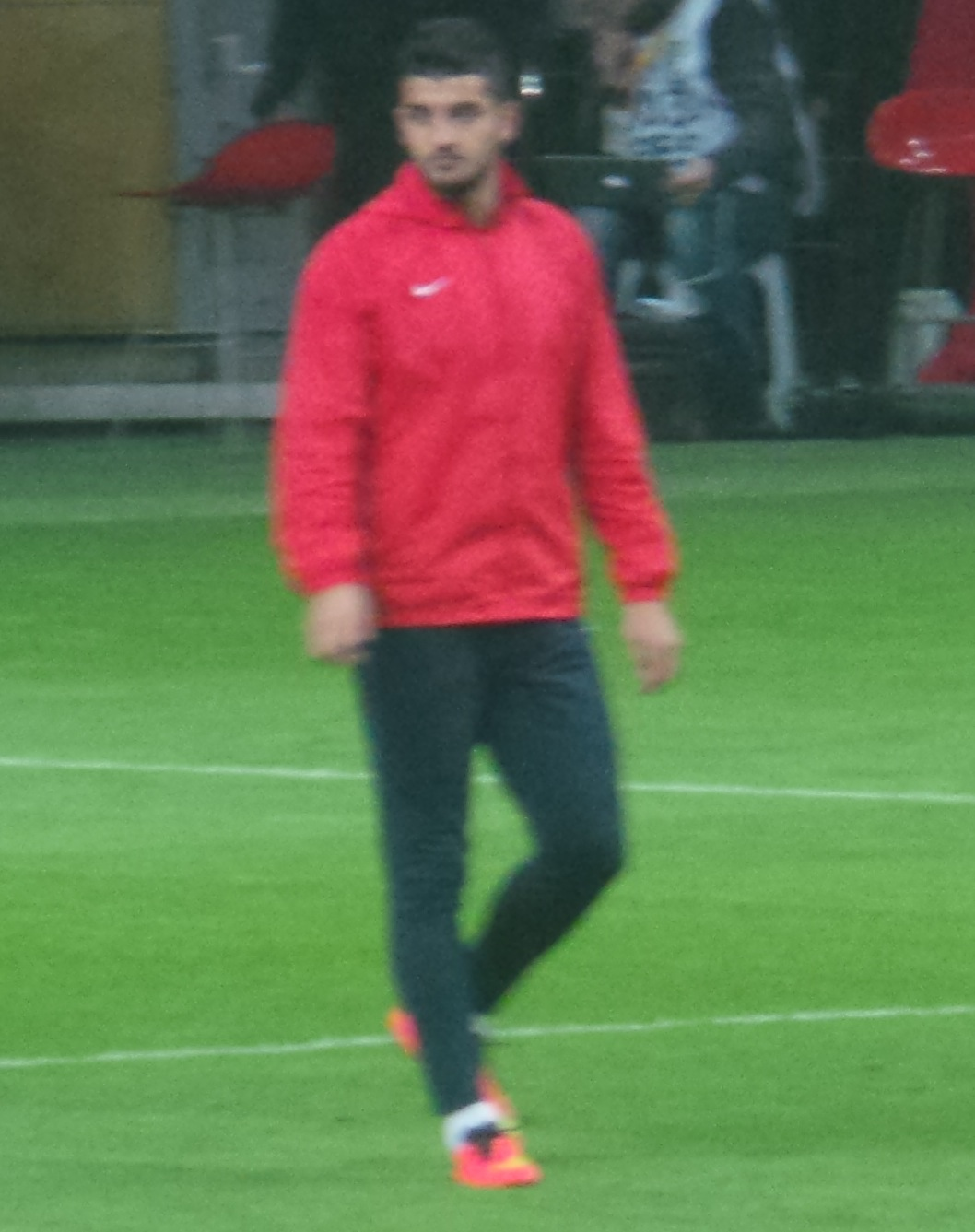
- Özarslan in 2014

Personal information
- Full name: Efe Halİl Özarslan
- Date of birth: 29 March 1990 (age 36)
- Place of birth: Mersin, Turkey
- Height: 1.95 m (6 ft 5 in)
- Position: Defender

Youth career
- 2002–2003: Çİftlİkköy Adonİsspor
- 2003–2008: Mersin İdmanyurdu

Senior career*
Years	Team	Apps	(Gls)
2008–2012	Gençlerbirliği	0	(0)
2009–2010	→ Ankara Demirspor (loan)	16	(0)
2010–2011	→ Hacettepe (loan)	29	(5)
2011–2012	→ Bucaspor (loan)	33	(3)
2012–2013	Bucaspor	29	(5)
2013–2016	Mersin İdmanyurdu	51	(1)
2016	Karşıyaka	10	(0)
2016–2017	Boluspor	3	(0)
2017	Kayserispor	1	(0)
2017–2018	Amed	3	(1)
2018	Fethiyespor	2	(0)
2018–2019	İçelspor	0	(0)

International career
2009	Turkey U19	2	(0)
2014	Turkey A2	1	(0)
- * Club domestic league appearances and goals as of 7 October 2018

Efe Halİl Özarslan (born 29 March 1990) is a Turkish former professional footballer who played as a defender.
