= Sinan Kaloğlu =

Turkish footballer

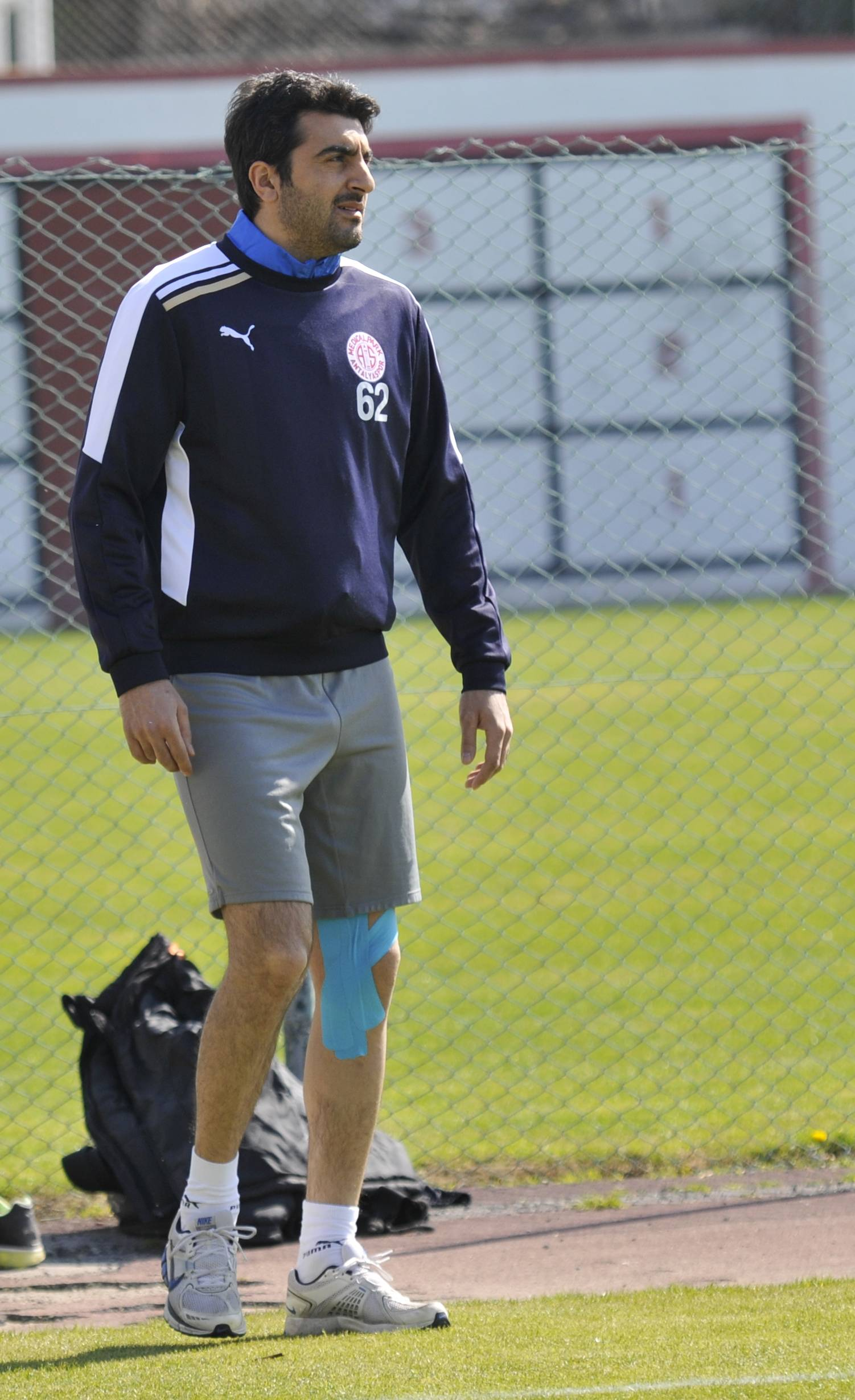

Personal information
- Date of birth: 10 June 1981 (age 45)
- Place of birth: Ovacık, Tunceli, Turkey
- Height: 1.91 m (6 ft 3 in)
- Position: Striker

Senior career*
Years	Team	Apps	(Gls)
1999–2000	Boluspor	0	(0)
2000–2003	→ Göztepe S.K. (loan)	15	(1)
2000–2003	Altay	63	(27)
2000–2001	→ Marmaris Belediyespor (loan)	29	(16)
2003–2006	Beşiktaş	22	(1)
2004–2005	→ Diyarbakırspor (loan)	33	(11)
2005–2006	→ Manisaspor (loan)	25	(7)
2006–2008	Bursaspor	52	(14)
2008–2009	VfL Bochum	18	(3)
2009–2011	Vitesse Arnhem	8	(2)
2011–2012	Karabükspor	5	(0)
2012	Antalyaspor	4	(0)
2012–2013	Elazığspor	21	(6)
2013	Kayseri Erciyesspor	7	(1)
2014–2017	Mersin İdmanyurdu	86	(14)
Total		388	(102)

International career
2002–2003	Turkey U21	15	(3)
2006–	Turkey B	2	(1)
2006–2008	Turkey	2	(0)

Managerial career
- 2018–2019: Altay (youth)
- 2021–2022: Altay (assistant)
- 2022–2023: Altay
- 2023–2024: Gençlerbirliği
- 2024–2025: Kayserispor
- 2025–2026: Amedspor
- 2026: Pendikspor
- * Club domestic league appearances and goals

Sinan Kaloğlu (born 10 June 1981) is a Turkish professional football Coach and former professional player. As a player, he played as a striker.

== International career ==
Kaloğlu made his first appearance Turkey national team on 12 April 2006 against Azerbaijan in Tofik Bakhramov Stadium.

== Managerial Stastistics ==
Team	Nation	From	To
Altay S.K.	(Turkey)	24 March 22	08 February 23
Gençlerbirliği S.K.	(Turkey)	05 April 23	30 June 24
Kayserispor	(Turkey)	10 October 24	25 January 25
Amed SK	(Turkey)	11 October 25	16 February 26
Pendikspor	(Turkey)	19 February 26	03 July 26
