= Serkan Balcı =

Turkish footballer (born 1983)

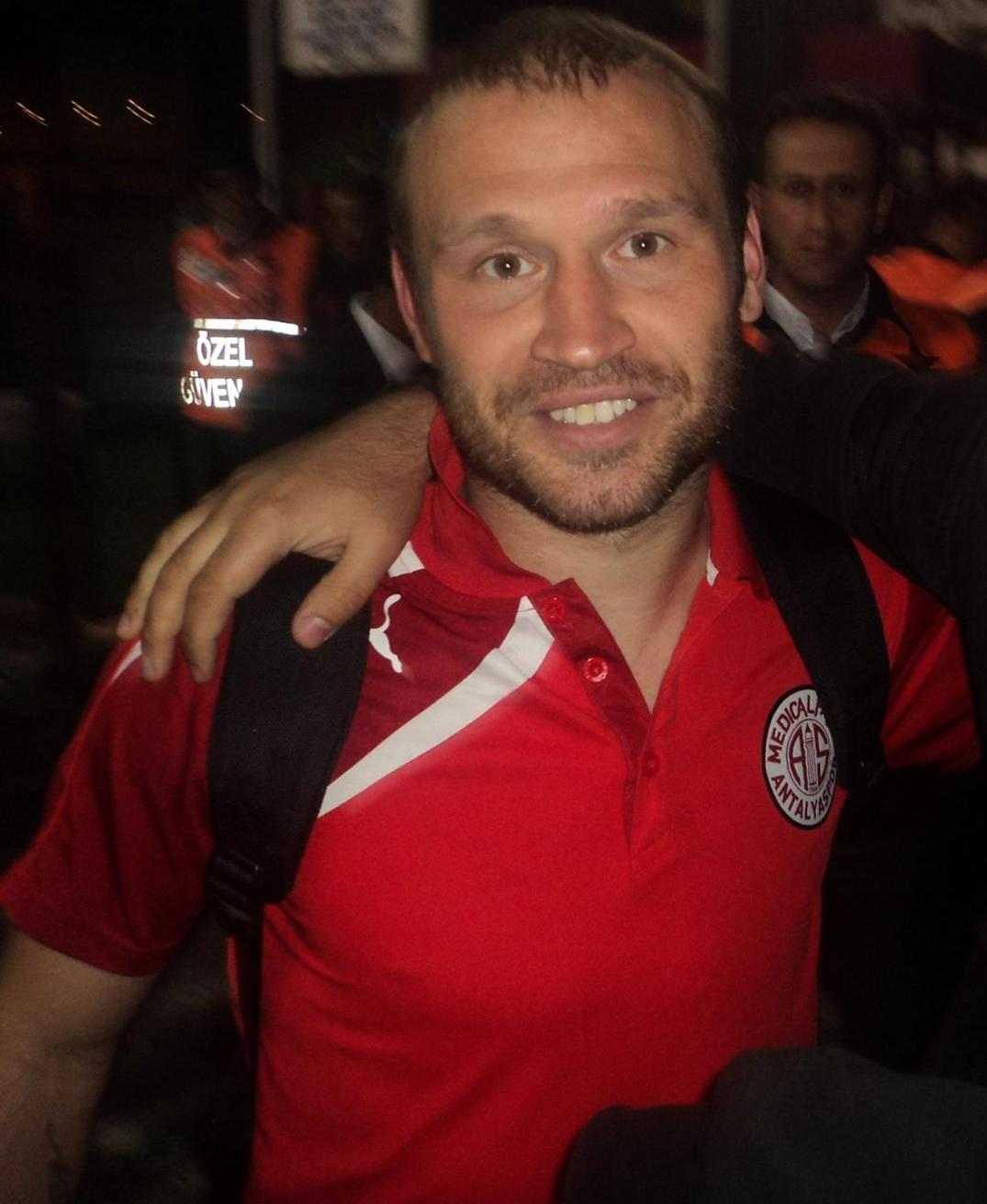
- Balcı playing for Antalyaspor

Personal information
- Full name: Serkan Balcı
- Date of birth: 22 August 1983 (age 43)
- Place of birth: Nazilli, Aydın, Turkey
- Height: 1.73 m (5 ft 8 in)
- Positions: Right wing back; defensive midfielder

Youth career
- 1994–1999: Aydın Pamukspor
- 1999–2000: Yalıkavak Belediye

Senior career*
Years	Team	Apps	(Gls)
2000–2004	Gençlerbirliği	92	(5)
2004–2007	Fenerbahçe	69	(0)
2007–2013	Trabzonspor	178	(1)
2013–2014	Antalyaspor	32	(0)
2014–2016	Mersin İdmanyurdu	53	(1)
2016–2017	Ankaragücü	26	(0)
2017–2019	Sarıyer	49	(2)
Total		499	(9)

International career
2001	Turkey U18	3	(1)
2001	Turkey U19	6	(0)
2002–2003	Turkey U20	6	(0)
2002–2003	Turkey U21	11	(0)
2003–2011	Turkey	24	(0)

Managerial career
- 2019–2020: Osmanlıspor (assistant)
- 2020–2021: Çorum FK (assistant)
- * Club domestic league appearances and goals

Serkan Balcı (pronounced [seɾkan baɫdʒɯ]; born 22 August 1983) is a former Turkish international footballer.

== Club career ==
He has played for Fenerbahçe SK and Gençlerbirliği S.K. He signed for Trabzonspor in June 2007.

== International career ==
He was member of Turkey national football team in 2003 FIFA Confederations Cup which finished in third place.

== Career statistics ==
=== International ===
Appearances and goals by national team and year
National team	Year	Apps	Goals
Turkey	2003	3	0
Turkey	2004	12	0
Turkey	2005	6	0
Turkey	2006	–	
Turkey	2007	–	
Turkey	2008	1	0
Turkey	2009	–	
Turkey	2010	–	
Turkey	2011	2	0
Total		24	0

== Honours ==
Gençlerbirliği

- Turkish Cup: 2000–01

Fenerbahçe

- Süper Lig: 2004–05, 2006–07

Trabzonspor

- Turkish Cup: 2009–10
- Turkish Super Cup: 2010

Turkey

- FIFA Confederations Cup third place: 2003
