= Serol Demirhan =

Turkish footballer

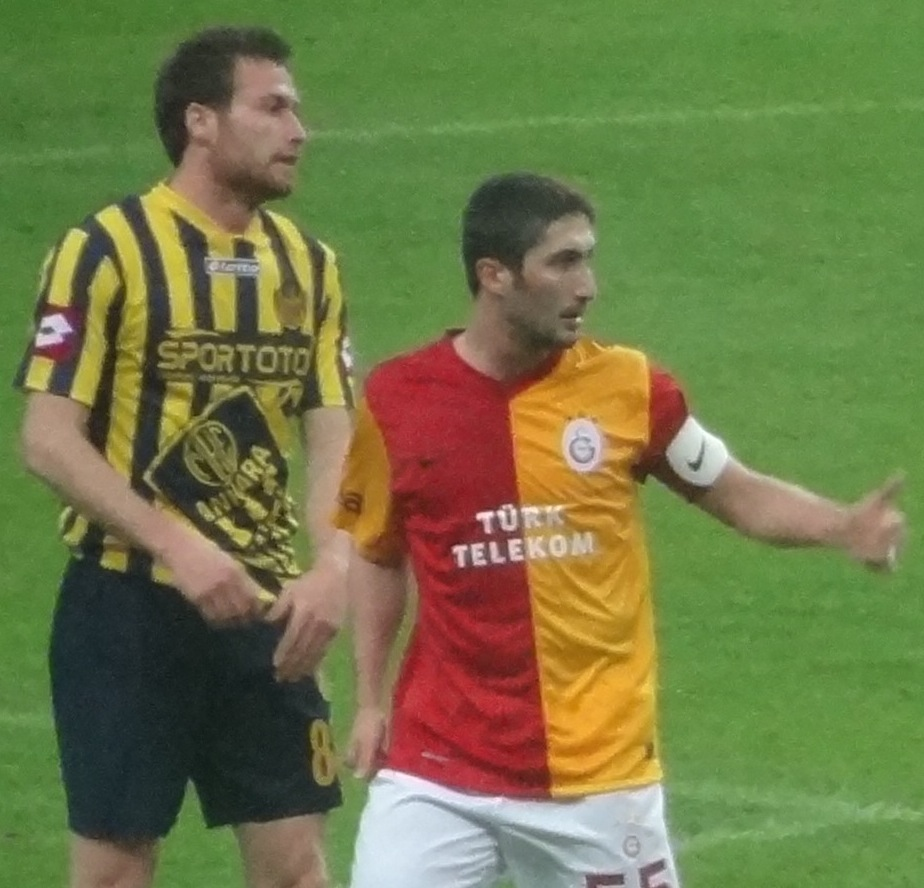

Personal information
- Date of birth: December 5, 1988 (age 37)
- Place of birth: Altındağ, Turkey
- Height: 1.75 m (5 ft 9 in)
- Positions: Left back; left winger

Senior career*
Years	Team	Apps	(Gls)
2006–2010	Ankaraspor	5	(0)
2007–2010	→ Bugsaşspor (loan)	13	(0)
2010–2012	Ankaragücü	10	(2)
2010–2011	→ Beypazarı Şekerspor (loan)	12	(1)
2011–2012	→ Ankara Demirspor (loan)	16	(1)
2012–2014	Eskişehirspor	14	(0)
2014–2017	Mersin İdmanyurdu	28	(1)
2019–2020	Kahramanmaraşspor	0	(0)

International career
2007	Turkey U19	1	(0)
- * Club domestic league appearances and goals as of 23:57, 2 September 2019 (UTC)

Serol Demirhan (born December 5, 1988) is a Turkish footballer who plays as a left back.
