= Güven Varol =

Turkish footballer

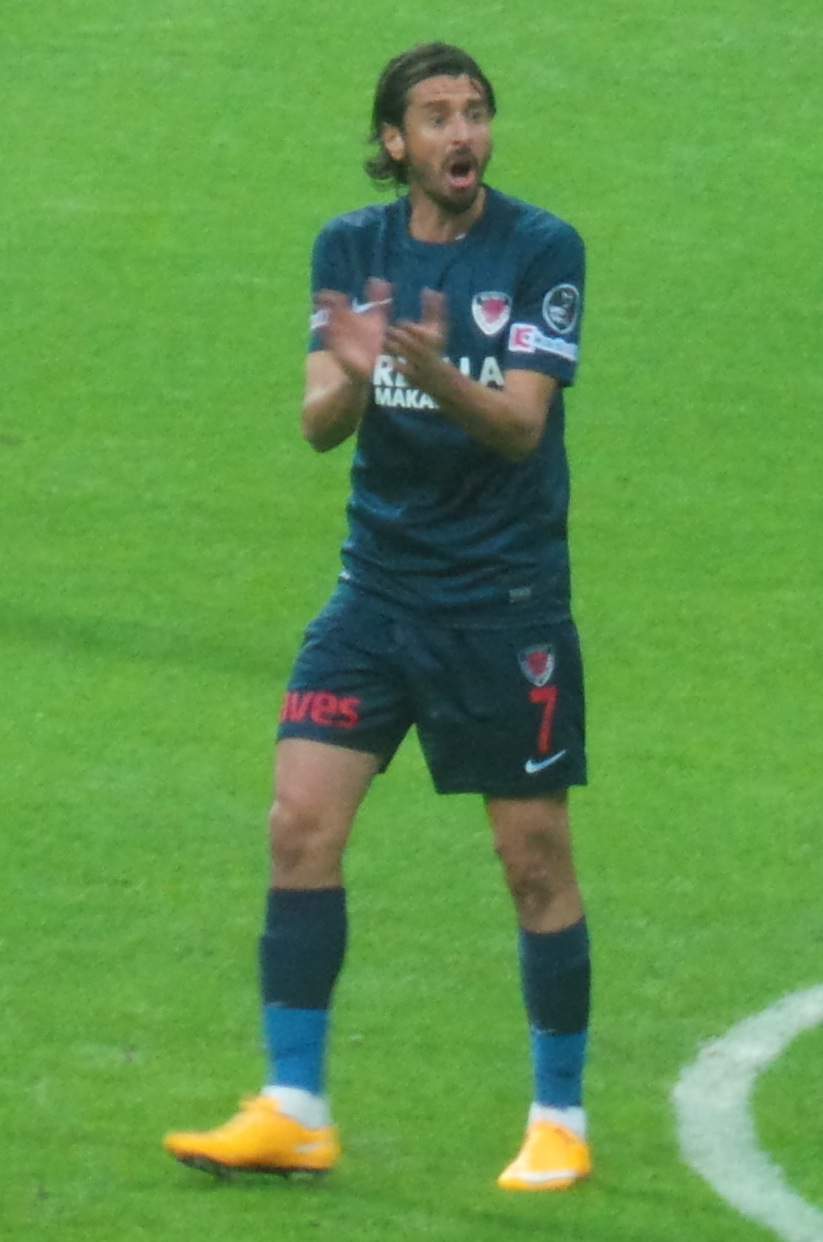

Personal information
- Date of birth: 2 June 1981 (age 45)
- Place of birth: Adapazarı, Sakarya, Turkey
- Height: 1.80 m (5 ft 11 in)
- Position: Attacking midfielder

Youth career
- 1998–1999: Sakaryaspor
- 1999–2000: Anadolu Hisarı I.Y.

Senior career*
Years	Team	Apps	(Gls)
2000–2002	Pendikspor	57	(5)
2002–2004	TTNet Beykoz	56	(14)
2004–2006	Denizlispor	38	(2)
2006–2010	Manisaspor	83	(8)
2010–2011	MKE Ankaragücü	37	(1)
2012–2013	Karabükspor	12	(0)
2013–2017	Mersin İdmanyurdu	117	(15)

International career
2004–2005	Turkey A2	2	(0)
- * Club domestic league appearances and goals as of 2 May 2017

Güven Varol (born 2 June 1981) is a Turkish former professional footballer who played as an attacking midfielder.

== Club career ==
Varol began his career with Pendikspor in 2000. He joined Beykozspor in 2002 and Denizlispor in 2004. After playing for Manisaspor from 2006–2010, he signed a three-year contract with Ankaragücü.
