= Oktay Delibalta =

Turkish footballer

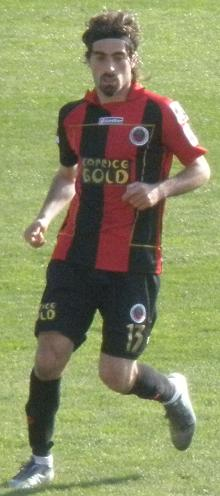

Personal information
- Date of birth: 27 October 1985 (age 41)
- Place of birth: Samsun, Turkey
- Height: 1.80 m (5 ft 11 in)
- Position: Midfielder

Youth career
- 1998–2004: Sarıyer

Senior career*
Years	Team	Apps	(Gls)
2004–2008	Alibeyköyspor	94	(11)
2008–2010	Samsunspor	52	(7)
2010–2014	Gençlerbirliği	82	(13)
2013	→ Gaziantepspor (loan)	13	(0)
2014–2016	Mersin İdmanyurdu	26	(5)
2016	Antalyaspor	1	(0)
2016–2017	Şanlıurfaspor	11	(0)
2017–2018	Gümüşhanespor	28	(7)
2018–2019	Fethiyespor	23	(3)
- * Club domestic league appearances and goals ‡ National team caps and goals as of 20:25, 27 June 2019 (UTC)

Oktay Delibalta (born 27 October 1985 in Samsun, Turkey) is a Turkish footballer who plays as a midfielder, most recently for Fethiyespor.
