= Nurullah Kaya =

Turkish footballer

Personal information
- Date of birth: 20 July 1986 (age 40)
- Place of birth: Batman, Turkey
- Height: 1.73 m (5 ft 8 in)
- Positions: Central midfielder; left wing; left back

Team information
- Current team: Yeni Mersin İdmanyurdu

Youth career
- 1998–2004: Mersin İdman Yurdu

Senior career*
Years	Team	Apps	(Gls)
2004–2005	Mersin İdman Yurdu	0	(0)
2005–2006	Mezitlispor	42	(7)
2006–2018	Mersin İdman Yurdu	199	(16)
2013	→ Adana Demirspor (loan)	14	(5)
2018	→ Tarsus İdman Yurdu (loan)	13	(0)
2018–2022	Tarsus İdman Yurdu	84	(1)
2022–	Yeni Mersin İdmanyurdu	6	(0)
- * Club domestic league appearances and goals as of 13 November 2022

Nurullah Kaya (born 20 July 1986) is a Turkish footballer who plays for TFF Third League club Yeni Mersin İdmanyurdu. He made his Süper Lig debut on 11 December 2011.
