= Mehmet Taş =

Turkish footballer

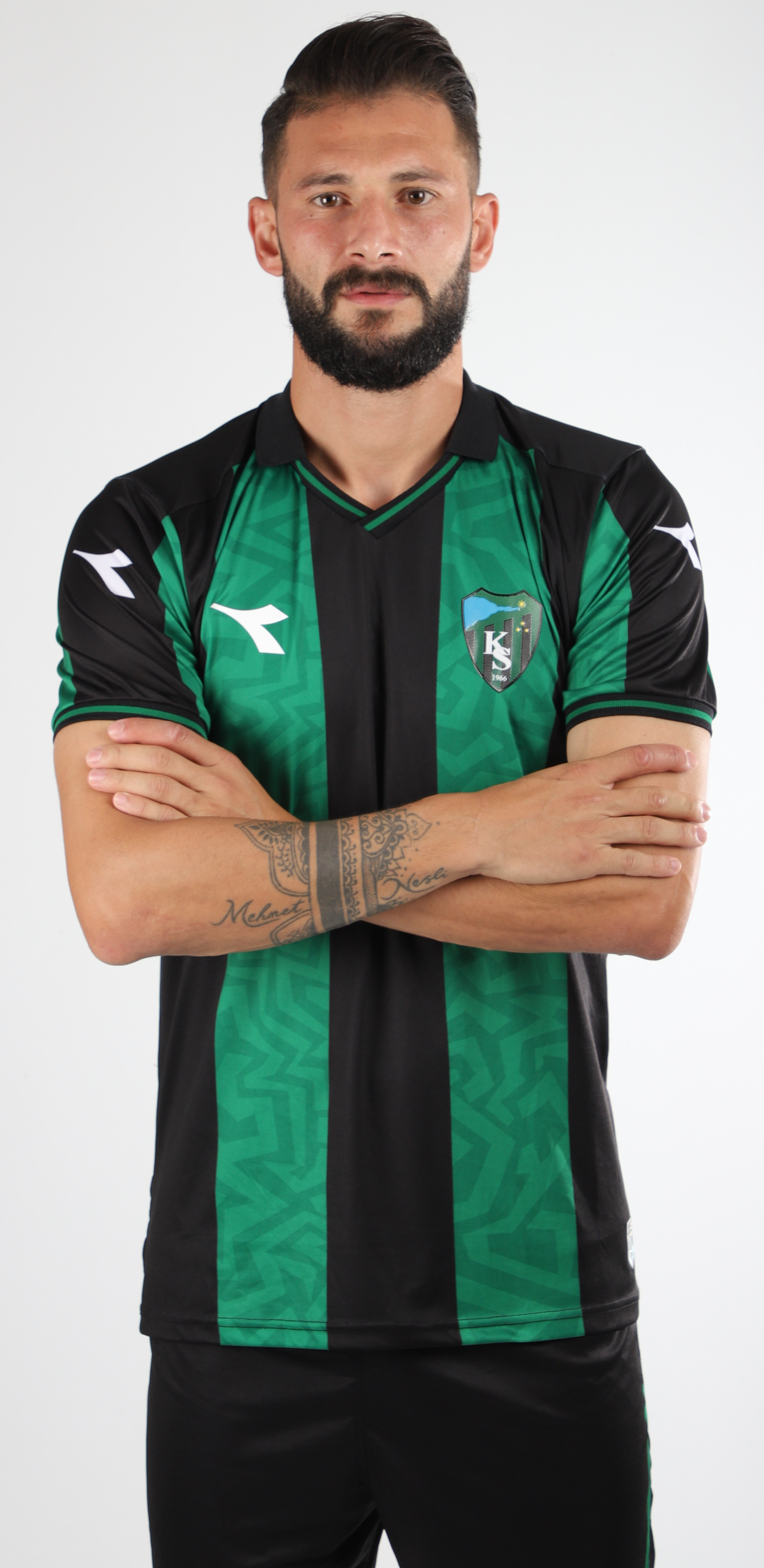
- Taş in 2022

Personal information
- Date of birth: 20 March 1991 (age 35)
- Place of birth: Mersin, Turkey
- Height: 1.79 m (5 ft 10 in)
- Position: Defensive midfielder

Team information
- Current team: Erzurumspor
- Number: 6

Youth career
- 2005–2010: Ankaragücü

Senior career*
Years	Team	Apps	(Gls)
2010	Ankaragücü	0	(0)
2010	→ Ankara Demirspor (loan)	9	(0)
2010–2011	Hatayspor	29	(2)
2011–2014	Nazilli Belediyespor	65	(3)
2014–2016	Mersin İdmanyurdu	30	(2)
2016–2017	Adana Demirspor	27	(0)
2017–2018	Gençlerbirliği	2	(0)
2018–2019	Denizlispor	2	(0)
2019–2021	Giresunspor	66	(2)
2021–2023	Kocaelispor	48	(2)
2023–2024	Tuzlaspor	21	(0)
2024	Adanaspor	13	(1)
2024–2024	Sarıyer	15	(0)
2025–	Erzurumspor	9	(0)
- * Club domestic league appearances and goals as of 15 June 2025

Mehmet Taş (born 20 March 1991) is a Turkish footballer who plays for Erzurumspor.
