= Mehmet Sığırcı =

Turkish footballer

Personal information
- Full name: Mehmet Enes Sığırcı
- Date of birth: 24 February 1993 (age 33)
- Place of birth: Güngören, Turkey
- Height: 1.89 m (6 ft 2 in)
- Position: Centre back

Team information
- Current team: Hendekspor

Youth career
- 2005–2008: Yesilyurt Belediyespor
- 2008–2011: Ankaragücü

Senior career*
Years	Team	Apps	(Gls)
2011–2012	Lüleburgazspor	24	(1)
2012–2014	Erzincan Refahiyespor	33	(0)
2014	Hatayspor	3	(1)
2014–2017	Mersin İdmanyurdu	21	(0)
2015	→ Yeni Malatyaspor (loan)	12	(1)
2017–2018	Manisaspor	5	(0)
2018–2020	Altınordu	15	(0)
2021–2022	Niğde Anadolu	8	(0)
2022	Sivas Belediyespor	2	(0)
2022–	Hendekspor	0	(0)

International career
2009	Turkey U17	1	(0)
- * Club domestic league appearances and goals as of 7 May 2022

Mehmet Enes Sığırcı (born 24 February 1993) is a Turkish professional footballer who plays for the amateur side Hendekspor.
