= Berkan Afşarlı =

German footballer

Berkan Afsarli
Personal information
- Date of birth: 1 March 1991 (age 35)
- Place of birth: Lindau, Germany
- Height: 1.73 m (5 ft 8 in)
- Position: Midfielder

Youth career
- FC Wangen
- VfB Stuttgart

Senior career*
Years	Team	Apps	(Gls)
2010–2012	VfB Stuttgart II	0	(0)
2010–2011	→ SC Paderborn II (loan)	0	(0)
2012–2014	Wil	26	(0)
2014–2016	Mersin İdmanyurdu	12	(1)
2016–2018	Denizlispor	29	(3)
2018–2019	Pendikspor	23	(3)
2020	Bayrampaşa	1	(0)
2020–2021	Kızılcabölükspor	16	(3)

International career
2008	Germany U18	3	(1)
2010	Germany U19	3	(1)
- * Club domestic league appearances and goals as of 23:11, 8 November 2020 (UTC)

Berkan Afsarli (born 1 March 1991) is a German professional footballer who most recently played as a midfielder for Turkish club Kızılcabölükspor.

== Career ==
In February 2015, Afsarli was diagnosed with cancer but he fully recovered and joined Denizlispor in August 2016.
