= Gökçek Vederson =

Brazilian-Turkish footballer (born 1981)

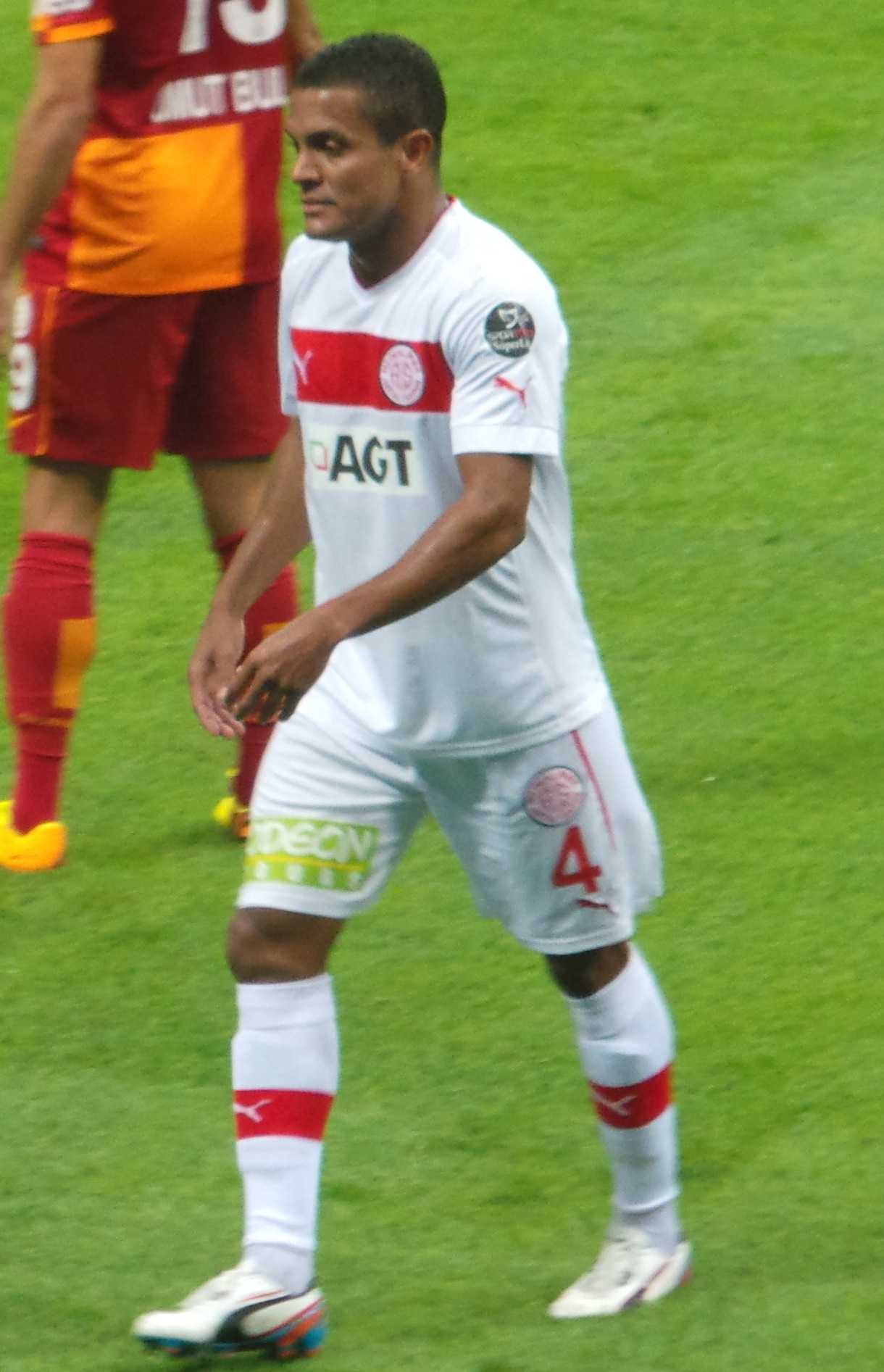

Personal information
- Full name: Wederson Luiz da Silva Medeiros
- Date of birth: 22 July 1981 (age 45)
- Place of birth: Campos dos Goytacazes, Brazil
- Height: 1.75 m (5 ft 9 in)
- Positions: Left back; left winger

Team information
- Current team: Rio Branco

Senior career*
Years	Team	Apps	(Gls)
2001	Internacional	23	(3)
2002	Americano	0	(0)
2002	Vasco da Gama	10	(0)
2003	Juventude	2	(0)
2004	Ituano	0	(0)
2004–2007	Ankaraspor	86	(20)
2007–2010	Fenerbahçe	72	(4)
2010–2013	Bursaspor	86	(4)
2013–2014	Antalyaspor	29	(3)
2014–2016	Mersin Idman Yurdu	58	(7)
2016–2017	Adana Demirspor	0	(0)

Managerial career
- 2025–: Rio Branco (assistant)
- 2025: Rio Branco (interim)
- * Club domestic league appearances and goals as of 18 February 2016

Gökçek Vederson (born Wederson Luiz da Silva Medeiros; 22 July 1981) is a Brazilian retired footballer who played as a left-back.

== Career ==
Born Rio de Janeiro state, Wederson has played for Internacional, Americano, Vasco da Gama, Juventude and Ituano. He left for Turkey in August 2004.

He signed a 3-year contract with Fenerbahçe on 11 June 2007.

== Citizenship ==
Vederson holds dual-citizenship with Brazil and Turkey. The latter he received in March 2007. Having not been capped by the Brazil national football team, Vederson had the option of playing for Turkey national football team.
