= Nihat Şahin =

Turkish footballer

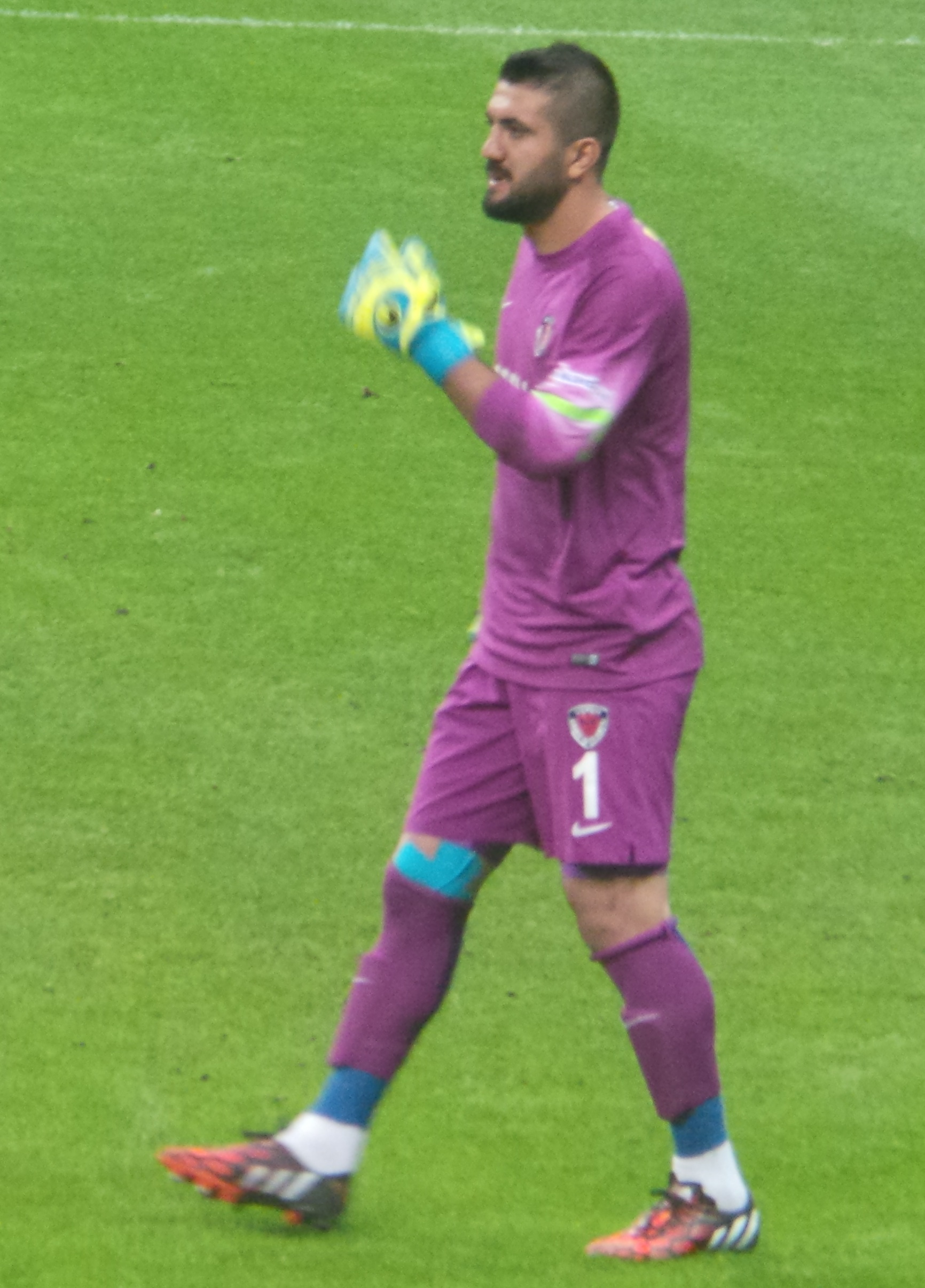

Personal information
- Date of birth: 15 September 1989 (age 37)
- Place of birth: İzmir, Turkey
- Height: 1.91 m (6 ft 3 in)
- Position: Goalkeeper

Youth career
- 2000: Kar Icecek Sarilar Spor
- 2000–2003: Antalyaspor
- 2003–2005: Varsakspor
- 2005–2008: Körfez İskenderunspor

Senior career*
Years	Team	Apps	(Gls)
2008–2009	Körfez İskenderunspor	0	(0)
2009–2011	Ofspor	43	(0)
2011–2014	Sivasspor	9	(0)
2014–2016	Mersin İdman Yurdu	27	(0)
2016–2018	Gençlerbirliği	2	(0)
2018–2019	Gazişehir Gaziantep	2	(0)
- * Club domestic league appearances and goals as of 9 June 2019

Nihat Şahin (born 15 September 1989) is a Turkish footballer who last played as a goalkeeper for Gazişehir Gaziantep.

Nihat made his Süper Lig debut for Sivasspor on 2 February 2012.
