= Tita (footballer, born 1981) =

Brazilian-born Turkish footballer

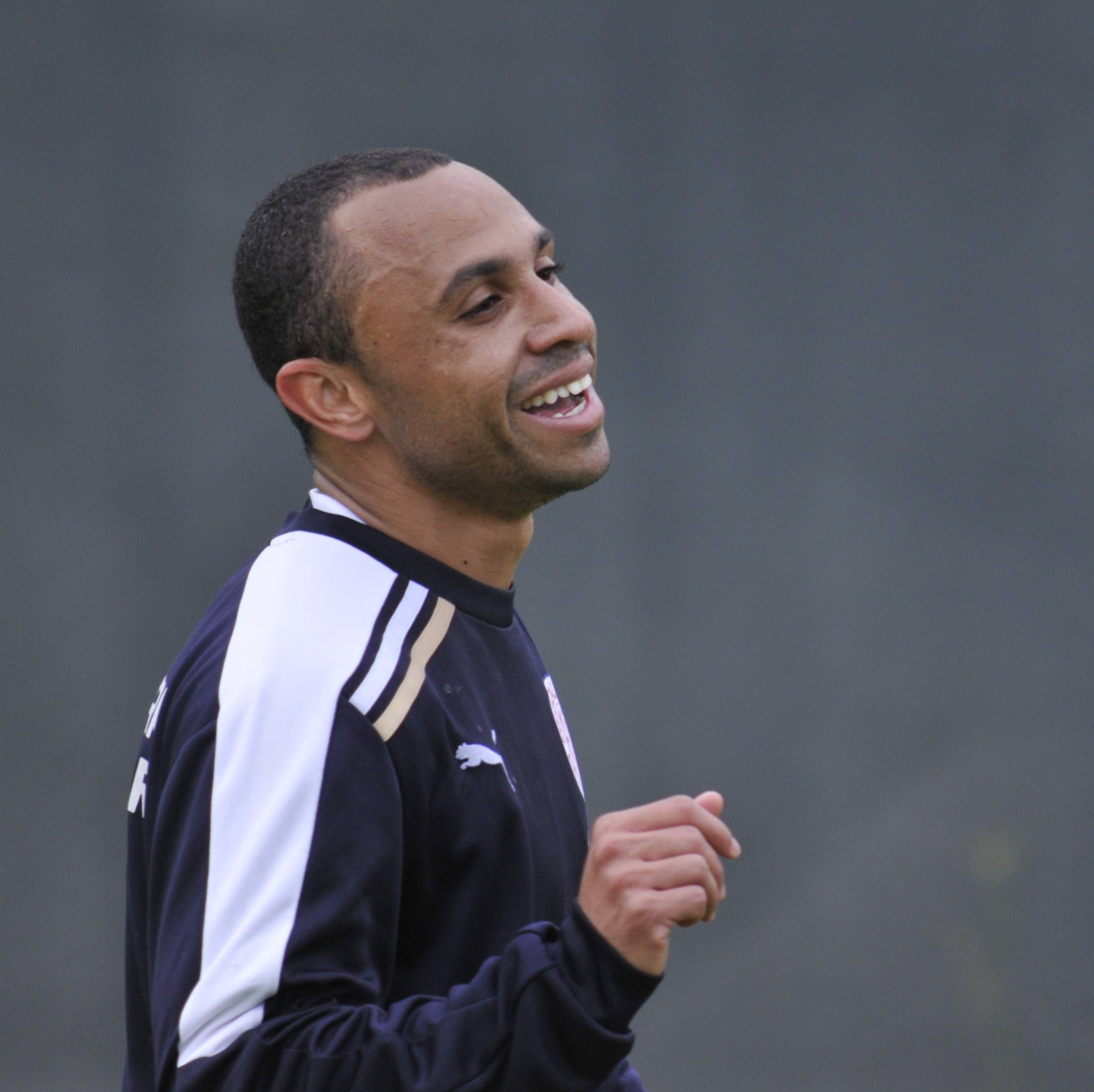

Personal information
- Full name: Sidney Cristiano dos Santos
- Date of birth: 20 May 1981 (age 45)
- Place of birth: Rio de Janeiro, Brazil
- Height: 1.65 m (5 ft 5 in)
- Positions: Second striker; winger

Senior career*
| Years | Team | Apps | (Gls) |
| 2002–2003 | Ituano | 29 | (8) |
| 2004–2011 | Ankaraspor | 93 | (14) |
| 2006–2007 | → Ankaragücü (loan) | 28 | (5) |
| 2009–2011 | → Antalyaspor (loan) | 80 | (17) |
| 2011–2014 | Antalyaspor | 85 | (21) |
| 2014–2017 | Mersin İdmanyurdu | 80 | (5) |
| 2017–2018 | Gümüşhanespor | 32 | (8) |
| 2018–2019 | Nevşehir Belediyespor | 31 | (8) |
- * Club domestic league appearances and goals as of 23 May 2019

Sidney Cristiano dos Santos (born 20 July 1981) better known as Tita, is a professional footballer who most recently played for Nevşehir Belediyespor. Born in Rio de Janeiro, Brazil, he took the Turkish name Melih Gökçek after taking Turkish citizenship in 2011.
