= 2009–10 Mersin İdmanyurdu season =

Mersin İdmanyurdu
2009–10 season
- President: Ali Kahramanlı
- Head coach: Serhat Güller (till 10 February 2010); Ergün Penbe (till 31 May 2010)
- Stadium: Tevfik Sırrı Gür Stadium; Mersin, Turkey (Capacity: 10,128)
- TFF First League: 13th
- Turkish Cup: Eliminated at Play-offs Round
- Top goalscorer: League: Caner Ağca (7); All: Caner Ağca (7); Tunç Behram (7)
Home colours	Away colours	Third colours

Mersin İdmanyurdu (also Mersin İdman Yurdu, Mersin İY, or MİY) Sports Club; located in Mersin, east Mediterranean coast of Turkey in 2009–10. Mersin İdmanyurdu football team has finished 2008–09 season in second place in TFF Second League Promotion Group and promoted to 2009–10 TFF First League. This was the second promotion of the team and MİY became the first team that promoted to TFF First League twice. After formation of the league in 2001 (as Lig A), MİY became second team which relegated and then promoted again, after Adanaspor (the third became Çanakkale Dardanelspor after promotion play-offs in 2008–09 season. Mersin idmanyurdu participated in 2009–10 Turkish Cup and eliminated at third round, which was the play-off round for group stage. In play-off game Antalyaspor beat MİY after 11 penalties.

Ali Kahramanlı was club president. Serhat Güller was head coach at the start of the season. Ergün Penbe took over the position after 20th round. Goalkeeper Kerem İnan was the most appeared player, while Caner Ağca and Tunç Behram were top goalscorers.

== 2009–10 TFF First League participation ==
2009–10 TFF First League was played as Bank Asya Birinci Lig due to sponsorship reasons. 18 teams attended. The winners and runners-up were promoted to 2010–11 Süper Lig. The third team to be promoted was determined through Promotion Group games organized as a one-leg league system. Bottom three teams were relegated to 2010–11 TFF Second League.

=== Results summary ===
Mersin İdmanyurdu (MİY) 2009–10 TFF First League season league summary:

	Overall									Home								Away							
Stage	Pc	Pl	W	D	L	GF	GA	GD	Pt	Pl	W	D	L	GF	GA	GD	Pt	Pl	W	D	L	GF	GA	GD	Pt
First half	11	17	7	1	9	18	25	-7	22	8	4	1	3	11	11	0	13	9	3	0	6	7	14	-7	9
Second half		17	4	7	6	18	19	-1	19	9	2	4	3	10	9	+1	10	8	2	3	3	8	10	-2	9
Overall	13	34	11	8	15	36	44	-8	41	17	6	5	6	21	20	+1	23	17	5	3	9	15	24	-9	18

Sources: 2013–14 TFF First League pages.

=== League table ===
Mersin İdmanyurdu (MİY) 2009–10 TFF First League season place in league table.

Pos	Team	Pld	W	D	L	GF	GA	GD	Pts
11	Erciyesspor	34	10	11	13	42	53	−11	41 (Note: KEC: 11 pts, 7–4; GBB: 10 pts, 6–4; MİY: 6 pts, 2–3; KRT: 5 pts, 2–6)
12	Gaziantep B.B.	34	11	8	15	31	38	−7	41
13	Mersin İdmanyurdu	34	11	8	15	36	44	−8	41
14	Kartalspor	34	11	8	15	32	43	−11	41
15	Çaykur Rizespor	34	10	10	14	37	53	−16	40

Source: TFF
Rules for classification: 1) points; 2) goal difference; 3) number of goals scored.

=== Results by round ===
Results of games MİY played in 2009–10 TFF First League by rounds:

Round	1	2	3	4	5	6	7	8	9	10	11	12	13	14	15	16	17	18	19	20	21	22	23	24	25	26	27	28	29	30	31	32	33	34
Ground	A	H	A	H	A	H	A	H	A	H	A	H	A	H	A	A	H	H	A	H	A	H	A	H	A	H	A	H	A	H	A	H	H	A
Result	L	L	W	W	W	D	L	L	L	W	W	L	L	W	L	L	W	D	L	L	L	D	L	D	W	W	D	L	D	L	W	D	W	D
Position	14	17	10	8	5	7	9	10	10	10	8	10	10	10	11	12	11	12	13	13	14	15	15	15	13	12	12	15	15	16	14	14	14	13

Source: TFF League page
A = Away; H = Home; W = Win; D = Draw; L = Loss

=== First half ===
Mersin idmanyurdu has started to league with a claim of direct promotion to 2010–11 Süper Lig. During the first transfer period contacts were signed with 15 new transfers and 3 newly professionalized ones. On the other hand, ways were parted with 17 previous season players. In the first half, however, the team has shown an undulant profile and become eleventh. The club management revised the goal for the rest of the season as taking sixth position. At the end of first half, contracts with 11 players were terminated (6 of which were new transfers of first transfer period, 2009–10) and nine players resigned (6 new transfer, 2 loans, 1 newly professionalized) before the start of the second half.

Mersin İdmanyurdu (MİY) 2009–10 TFF First League season first half game reports is shown in the following table: Kick off times are in EET and EEST.

23 August 2009 Round 1	Boluspor	2–1	Mersin İdmanyurdu	Bolu Atatürk Stadium, Bolu
Sunday, 16:30	Gilman Lika 25' (F); Gilman Lika 76' (P)	Report	89' (H) Tunç Murat Behram; (yellow card) 77' Zafer Şahin; (yellow card) 79' Faruk Atalay	Referee: Mustafa Öğretmenoğlu

29 August 2009 Round 2	Mersin İdmanyurdu	1–2	Adanaspor	Tevfik Sırrı Gür Stadium, Mersin
Saturday, 16:30	Nurullah Kaya 90+4' (F); Zafer Şahin (yellow card) 8'; Erdal Sezek (yellow card) 88' (red card); Serkan İrdem (yellow card) 89'	Report	63' (F) Mbilla Etame; 87' (F) Fevzi Özkan; (yellow card) 36' Onur Acar; (yellow card) 48' Mbilla Etame; (yellow card) 49' Marc Kibong Mbamba; (yellow card) 61' Emre Aktaş; (yellow card) 76' Anıl Karaer; (yellow card) 89' Ersan Gülüm	Referee: Serkan Çınar

6 September 2009 Round 3	Samsunspor	1–3	Mersin İdmanyurdu	19 Eylül Stadı, Ordu
Sunday, 16:00	Hakan Akman 77' (F); Adem Alkaşi (yellow card) 52'	Report	23' (F) Mustafa Tuna Kaya; 45' (F) Sami İzcican; 90+1' (F) Ramazan Durdu; (yellow card) 34' Mustafa Tuna Kaya; (yellow card) 40' Sami İzcican; (yellow card) 44' Erdal Sezek; (yellow card) 47' Serkan İrdem; (yellow card) 67' Caner Ağca	Referee: Özgüç Türkalp

13 September 2009 Round 4	Mersin İdmanyurdu	4–1	Giresunspor	Tevfik Sırrı Gür Stadium, Mersin
Sunday, 16:00	Caner Ağca 34' (F); Mustafa Tuna Kaya 37' (F); Murat Uluç 79' (F); Murat Uluç 85' (F)	Report	63' (H) Muzaffer Bilazer; (yellow card) 86' Fırat Sezer; (yellow card) 90' Eren Görür	Referee: Kuddusi Müftüoğlu

19 September 2009 Round 5	Altay	0–1	Mersin İdmanyurdu	Atatürk Stadium, İzmir
Saturday, 20:30	Alp Ergin (yellow card) 35'	Report	33' (F) Serkan İrdem; (yellow card) 86' Kerem İnan; (yellow card) 88' Murat Uluç; (yellow card) 89' Zafer Demiray	Referee: Mürvet Sezer

27 September 2009 Round 6	Mersin İdmanyurdu	0–0	Gaziantep BŞB	Tevfik Sırrı Gür Stadium, Mersin
Sunday, 16:00	Erdal Sezek (yellow card) 41' (red card); Can Ulun (yellow card) 47'; Birol Parlak (yellow card) 67'; Mustafa Tuna Kaya (yellow card) 89'	Report	(yellow card) 53' Bülent Tek; (yellow card) 64' Onur Kalafat; (yellow card) 75' Gökhan Solak	Referee: Hakan Özkan

4 October 2009 Round 7	Kayseri Erciyesspor	1–0	Mersin İdmanyurdu	Atatürk Stadium, side field, Kayseri
Sunday, 15:00	Kemal Samet Özen 58' (F); Erhan Yılmaz (yellow card) 65'; Aytek Aşıkoğlu (yellow card) 73'; Emre Uzunca (yellow card) 77'; Kemal Dulda (yellow card) 82'	Report	(yellow card) 48' Ahmet Çağıran; (yellow card) 77' Zafer Şahin	Referee: Fethi Serkan Koçak

11 October 2009 Round 8	Mersin İdmanyurdu	1–2	Dardanelspor	Tevfik Sırrı Gür Stadium, Mersin
Sunday, 15:00	Zafer Şahin 44' (F); Zafer Şahin 76' (o.g.); Zafer Şahin (yellow card) 45'; Can Ulun (yellow card) 59'; Tunç Murat Behram (yellow card) 67'	Report	58' (H) İsmail Özeren; (yellow card) 34' Samet Albayrak; (yellow card) 43' Uğur Parlak; (yellow card) 65' Babacar Diallo; (yellow card) 86' Samet Gül; (yellow card) 89' Emrah Bayram	Referee: Suat Arslanboğa

17 October 2009 Round 9	Konyaspor	2–0	Mersin İdmanyurdu	Atatürk Stadium, Konya
Saturday, 19:00	Tayfur Türkmen 10' (F); Erdal Kılıçaslan 46' (F); Zafer Demir (yellow card) 56'; Mehmet Ayaz (yellow card) 69'	Report	(yellow card) 45' Murat Uluç; (yellow card) 70' Erdal Sezek; (yellow card) 85' Kerem İnan	Referee: Süleyman Abay

24 October 2009 Round 10	Mersin İdmanyurdu	2–0	Kartalspor	Tevfik Sırrı Gür Stadium, Mersin
Saturday, 13:30	Ahmet Çağıran 44' (H); Caner Ağca 89' (F)	Report	(yellow card) 24' Selçuk Yıldırımkaya; (yellow card) 47' Muhammed Türkmen; (yellow card) 89' Mehmet Uslu	Referee: Taner Gizlenci

1 November 2009 Round 11	Orduspor	0–2	Mersin İdmanyurdu	19 Eylül Stadium, Ordu
Sunday, 13:30	Alaattin Tosun (yellow card) 18'; Emre Özkan (yellow card) 54'; Erol Yükseker (red card) 58'	Report	33' (H) Serkan İrdem; 63' (F) Caner Ağca; (yellow card) 28' Ramazan Durdu; (yellow card) 57' Aytekin Viduşlu	Referee: Özgüç Türkalp

8 November 2009 Round 12	Mersin İdmanyurdu	1–6	Kardemir DÇ Karabükspor	Tevfik Sırrı Gür Stadium, Mersin
Sunday, 13:30	Murat Uluç 31' (F); Ahmet Çağıran (yellow card) 83'	Report	23' (H) Engin Aktürk; 44' (F) Emmanuel Emenike; 67' (F) Hassan Wasswa; 71' (F) Emmanuel Emenike; 84' (F) Süleyman Görgün; 86' (F) Emmanuel Emenike; (yellow card) 44' Emmanuel Emenike; (yellow card) 67' Hassan Wasswa	Referee: Abdullah Yılmaz

22 November 2009 Round 13	Karşıyaka	3–0	Mersin İdmanyurdu	Alsancak Stadium, İzmir
Sunday, 13:30	Kıvanç Karakaş 63' (H); Kıvanç Karakaş 67' (H); Okan Öztürk 72' (F); Mutlu Kızıltan (yellow card) 82'	Report	(yellow card) 29' Ozan Özkan; (yellow card) 42' Ramazan Durdu; (yellow card) 72' Sertaç Şahin	Referee: Mete Kalkavan

29 November 2009 Round 14	Mersin İdmanyurdu	1–0	Bucaspor	Tevfik Sırrı Gür Stadium, Mersin
Sunday, 13:30	Ramazan Durdu 52' (P); Serkan İrdem (yellow card) 25'; Ozan Özkan (yellow card) 66'; Ramazan Durdu (yellow card) 75'	Report	(yellow card) 43' Mehmet Batdal; (yellow card) 44' İzzet Kaya; (yellow card) 50' Bekir Yılmaz; (yellow card) 54' Onur Çubukçu; (yellow card) 58' Zafer Çevik; (yellow card) 89' Emrecan Afacanoğlu	Referee: Fethi Serkan Koçak

6 December 2009 Round 15	Çaykur Rizespor	4–0	Mersin İdmanyurdu	Yeni Rize Şehir Stadium, Rize
Sunday, 13:30	Mustafa Ulaş Ortakaya 47' (F); Elionar Bombinha 49' (F); Elionar Bombinha 51' (F); Kemal Aslan 65' (F); Mustafa Çiçek (yellow card) 73'	Report	(yellow card) 67' Kerem İnan; (yellow card) 89' Sertaç Şahin	Referee: Taner Gizlenci

13 December 2009 Round 16	Kocaelispor	1–0	Mersin İdmanyurdu	Ismet Pasa Stadium, İzmit, Kocaeli
Sunday, 13:30	Onur Alkan 78' (P); Mehmet Öztonga (yellow card) 84'; Onur Alkan (yellow card) 88' (red card)	Report	(yellow card) 57' Aytekin Viduşlu; (yellow card) 65' Mustafa Tuna Kaya; (red card) 77' Mustafa Tuna Kaya	Referee: Çağatay Şahan

20 December 2009 Round 17	Mersin İdmanyurdu	1–0	Hacettepespor	Tevfik Sırrı Gür Stadium, Mersin
Sunday, 13:30	Sami İzcican 5' (F); Caner Ağca (yellow card) 27'; Ozan Özkan (yellow card) 43'; Murat Uluç (yellow card) 88'	Report	(yellow card) 52' Celal Aras; (yellow card) 59' Sedat Dağ; (yellow card) 78' Ercüment Kafkasyalı	Referee: Hakan Ceylan

Sources: 2009–10 TFF First League pages.

=== Second half ===
In the second half of the season, MİY had a bad starting. After 20th week, head coach Serhat Güller resigned. New head coach Ergün Penbe watched 21st week game at Giresun among audience and signed on 10 February 2010 with commitment messages to fans related to a better league results: "nothing has finished yet." However, as the time takes the team has shown an instable performance; and couldn't score goals in many matches. Therefore, at the end of the league the aim of the team was revised as "remaining in the league". MİY played a relegation game in the last game of the season with Hacettepespor, and remained in the league next season.

Mersin İdmanyurdu (MİY) 2009–10 TFF First League season second half game reports is shown in the following table: Kick off times are in EET and EEST.

17 January 2010 Round 18	Mersin İdmanyurdu	2–2	Boluspor	Tevfik Sırrı Gür Stadium, Mersin
Sunday, 13:30	Zafer Demiray 33' (F); Tunç Murat Behram 72' (F); Ramazan Durdu (yellow card) 43'; Murat Uluç (yellow card) 89'	Report	85' (F) Serdar Samatyalı; 89' (P) Serdar Samatyalı; (yellow card) 5' Ömer Yalçın; (yellow card) 9' Tolga Doğantez; (yellow card) 34' Gilman Lika; (yellow card) 37' (red card) Ömer Çuğ; (yellow card) 44' Adem Büyük; (yellow card) 69' Cemil Vatansever; (yellow card) 78' Erman Ergin	Referee: Mete Kalkavan

24 January 2010 Round 19	Adanaspor	3–2	Mersin İdmanyurdu	5 Ocak Stadium, Adana
Sunday, 13:30	Mbilla Etame 17' (F); Mohamed Ali Kurtuluş 31' (F); İzzet Yıldırım 61' (F); Onur Acar (yellow card) 38'; İzzet Yıldırım (yellow card) 61'; Onur Demirtaş (yellow card) 76'	Report	34' (F) Nurullah Kaya; 41' (F) Caner Ağca; (yellow card) 39' Joseph Boum	Referee: Kuddusi Müftüoğlu

31 January 2010 Round 20	Mersin İdmanyurdu	1–2	Samsunspor	Tevfik Sırrı Gür Stadium, Mersin
Sunday, 13:30	Caner Ağca 52' (F); Kerem İnan (yellow card) 18'; Ozan Özkan (yellow card) 24'; Murat Uluç (yellow card) 43'	Report	18' (F) Savaş Esen; 89' (F) Sezer Sezgin; (yellow card) 43' Abdülaziz Yılmaz; (yellow card) 52' Turgut Doğan Şahin; (yellow card) 72' Kenan Yelek; (yellow card) 79' Murat Yıldırım	Referee: Hüseyin Sabancı

7 February 2010 Round 21	Giresunspor	2–1	Mersin İdmanyurdu	Atatürk Stadium, Giresun
Sunday, 13:30	Şenol Demirci 11' (F); Fabiano Oliveira 81' (P); Gençer Cansev (yellow card) 55'	Report	85' (F) Caner Ağca; (yellow card) 10' Mustafa Aydın; (yellow card) 73' Zafer Şahin	Referee: Nihat Akman

13 February 2010 Round 22	Mersin İdmanyurdu	1–1	Altay	Tevfik Sırrı Gür Stadium, Mersin
Saturday, 13:30	Tunç Murat Behram 74' (F); Mustafa Tuna Kaya (yellow card) 17'; Tunç Murat Behram (yellow card) 49'; Zafer Şahin (yellow card) 85'; Kerem İnan (yellow card) 89'	Report	44' (F) Musa Çağıran; (yellow card) 40' Jorge Emanuel Molina; (yellow card) 65' Eyyüp Hasan Uğur; (yellow card) 85' Şeyhmus Özer	Referee: Fethi Serkan Koçak

21 February 2010 Round 23	Gaziantep BŞB	2–0	Mersin İdmanyurdu	Gaski Stadium, Gaziantep
Sunday, 13:30	Ramazan Altıntepe 14' (H); Kenan Aslanoğlu 79' (F); Ferit Cömert (yellow card) 31'	Report	(yellow card) 76' Mustafa Aydın; (yellow card) 89' Zafer Şahin	Referee: Hakan Ceylan

28 February 2010 Round 24	Mersin İdmanyurdu	0–0	Kayseri Erciyesspor	Tevfik Sırrı Gür Stadium, Mersin
Sunday, 13:30	Murat Uluç (yellow card) 44'; Zafer Şahin (yellow card) 45'; Caner Ağca (yellow card) 64'; Ramazan Durdu (yellow card) 76'	Report	(yellow card) 21' Muhammet Şeker; (yellow card) 32' Özgür Volkan Yıldırım; (yellow card) 76' Coşkun Birdal; (yellow card) 90+3' Fatih Kılıçkaya	Referee: Özgüç Türkalp

7 March 2010 Round 25	Dardanelspor	0–1	Mersin İdmanyurdu	18 Mart Stadium, Çanakkale
Sunday, 13:30	Murat Özavcı (yellow card) 9'; Samet Albayrak (yellow card) 85'; Mesut Saray (yellow card) 86'	Report	50' (H) Fuat Onur; (yellow card) 55' Fatih Egedik; (yellow card) 66' Murat Uluç; (yellow card) 77' Kerem İnan	Referee: Çağatay Şahan

14 March 2010 Round 26	Mersin İdmanyurdu	3–1	Konyaspor	Tevfik Sırrı Gür Stadium, Mersin
Sunday, 13:30	Mustafa Aydın 40' (H); Tunç Murat Behram 48' (F); Tunç Murat Behram 79' (F); Süleyman Fatih Şen (yellow card) 41'; Mustafa Aydın (yellow card) 44'	Report	67' (F) Kauê; (yellow card) 20' Ufukhan Bayraktar; (yellow card) 34' Haluk Tanrıseven; (red card) 41' Tayfun Türkmen	Referee: Mete Kalkavan

21 March 2010 Round 27	Kartalspor	0–0	Mersin İdmanyurdu	Kartal Stadium, Kartal, Istanbul
Sunday, 13:30	Efecan Karaca (yellow card) 44'; Serkan Özsoy (yellow card) 74'	Report	(yellow card) 74' Tunç Murat Behram	Referee: Hakan Özkan

28 March 2010 Round 28	Mersin İdmanyurdu	0–1	Orduspor	Tevfik Sırrı Gür Stadium, Mersin
Sunday, 14:30	Sülyman Fatih Şen (yellow card) 20'; Kerem İnan (yellow card) 24'; Mustafa Aydın (yellow card) 37'; Sami İzcican (yellow card) 53'; Sertaç Şahin (yellow card) 55'; Onur Karakabak (yellow card) 89'	Report	4' (F) Müslüm Yelken; (yellow card) 51' Mehmet Ayaz; (yellow card) 56' Ahmet Kuru; (yellow card) 89' Serdar Eyilik	Referee: Taner Gizlenci

4 April 2010 Round 29	Kardemir DÇ Karabükspor	0–0	Mersin İdmanyurdu	N. Şeyhoğlu Stadium, Karabük
Sunday, 14:30		Report	(yellow card) 87' Mustafa Aydın	Referee: Hakan Ceylan

11 April 2010 Round 30	Mersin İdmanyurdu	0–2	Karşıyaka	Tevfik Sırrı Gür Stadium, Mersin
Sunday, 14:30	Süleyman Fatih Şen (yellow card) 37'; Fuat Onur (yellow card) 79'; Serkan İrdem (yellow card) 83'; Caner Ağca (red card) 83'	Report	75' (F) Kerem Sarıhan; 88' (F) Mutlu Kızıltan; (yellow card) 60' Kıvanç Karakaş; (yellow card) 88' Taha Yalçıner	Referee: Mustafa İlker Coşkun

19 April 2010 Round 31	Bucaspor	2–3	Mersin İdmanyurdu	New Buca Stadium, İzmir
Monday, 20:00	Sercan Kaya 1' (F); Türker Demirhan 88' (F); Murat Karakoç (yellow card) 41'; Veli Kızılkaya (yellow card) 61'; Bekir Yılmaz (yellow card) 73'	Report	13' (F) Nurullah Kaya; 33' (F) Nurullah Kaya; 74' (F) Süleyman Fatih Şen; (yellow card) 21' Sertaç Şahin; (yellow card) 40' Joseph Boum; (yellow card) 48' Fatih Egedik; (yellow card) 60' Nurullah Kaya	Referee: Barış Şimşek

25 April 2010 Round 32	Mersin İdmanyurdu	0–0	Çaykur Rizespor	Tevfik Sırrı Gür Stadium, Mersin
Sunday, 14:30	Fatih Egedik (yellow card) 28'	Report	(yellow card) 61' Murat Ocak; (yellow card) 62' Mithat Yaşar; (yellow card) 68' Ersin Güreler	Referee: Tolga Özkalfa

2 May 2010 Round 33	Mersin İdmanyurdu	3–0	Kocaelispor	Tevfik Sırrı Gür Stadium, Mersin
Sunday, 15:00	Serkan İrdem 5' (F); Süleyman Fatih Şen 34' (F); Caner Ağca 60' (F); Nurullah Kaya (yellow card) 22'; Tunç Murat Behram (yellow card) 72'	Report	(yellow card) 35' Aydın Yıldırım	Referee: Zafer Demir

9 May 2010 Round 34	Hacettepespor	1–1	Mersin İdmanyurdu	Cebeci İnönü Stadium, Ankara
Sunday, 14:30	Mustafa Kaya 10' (H); Serhat Yapıcı (yellow card) 15'; Sedat Dağ (yellow card) 44'; Mustafa Kayabaşı (yellow card) 47'	Report	55' (F) Mustafa Tuna Kaya; (yellow card) 8' Mustafa Tuna Kaya; (yellow card) 75' Kerem İnan; (yellow card) 86' Fatih Egedik; (yellow card) 89' Serkan İrdem	Referee: Abdullah Yılmaz

Sources: 2009–10 TFF First League pages.

== 2009–10 Turkish Cup participation ==
2009–10 Turkish Cup was played with 71 teams in three stages. The 48th Cup was played as Ziraat Türkiye Kupası for sponsorship reasons. In the first stage 2 elimination rounds and a play-off round were played in one-leg elimination system. In the second stage 20 remaining teams played one-led round-robin group games in 4 groups, 5 teams in each group. In the third stage; quarter- and semifinals and finals played again in one-leg elimination rule. Finals played at a neutral venue. It was determined by TFF that MİY take place in 2009–10 Turkish Cup starting from the first round and was eliminated at play-offs round. Trabzonspor won the Cup for 8th time.

=== Cup track ===
The drawings and results Mersin İdmanyurdu (MİY) followed in 2009–10 Turkish Cup are shown in the following table.

Round	Own League	Opponent's League	Opponent	A/H	Score	Result
Round 1	First League	Third League	Hatayspor	A	2–4	Promoted
Round 2	First League	Second League	Eyüpspor	A	1–2	Promoted
Play-offs	First League	Süper Lig	Antalyaspor	H	8–9	Eliminated

Note: In the above table 'Score' shows For and Against goals whether the match played at home or not.

=== Game details ===
Mersin İdmanyurdu (MİY) 2009–10 Turkish Cup game reports is shown in the following table. Kick off times are in EET and EEST.

2 September 2009 Round 1	Hatayspor	2–4	Mersin İdmanyurdu	Atatürk Stadium, Antakya, Hatay
Wednesday, 15:30	Adil Karpuz 10' (F); Yusuf Tatlıdil 86' (F)	Report	14' (F) Faruk Atalay; 36' (F) Tunç Murat Behram; 63' (F) Mehmet Düz; 75' (F) Ramazan Durdu; (yellow card) 50' Güngör Tuğcu	Referee: Volkan Çetinkaya

30 September 2009 Round 2	Eyüpspor	1–2	Mersin İdmanyurdu	Eyüp Stadium, Eyüp, Istanbul
Wednesday, 13:30	Mansur Çalar 36' (F); Serhat Karakayalar (yellow card) 61'; Murat Baytaroğlu (yellow card) 85'; Fatih Kara (yellow card) 86'	Report	45' (H) Fuat Onur; 56' (H) Zafer Şahin; (yellow card) 59' Mehmet Düz; (yellow card) 88' Ghislain Aime Emo	Referee: Zafer Koçbay

28 October 2009 Play-offs	Mersin İdmanyurdu	2–2 (a.e.t.) (6–7 p)	Antalyaspor	Tevfik Sırrı Gür Stadium, Mersin
Wednesday, 13:30	Ahmet Çağıran 56' (F); Tunç Behram 71' (F); Tunç Behram (yellow card) 71'; Nurullah Kaya (yellow card) 82'	Report	16' (H) Mile Jedinak; 75' (H) Mile Jedinak; (yellow card) 49' Ahmet Kuru; (yellow card) 63' Korhan Öztürk; (yellow card) 89' Serge Djiehoua	Referee: Hüseyin Sabancı
	Penalties
	Ramazan Durdu (penalty scored); Zafer Şahin (penalty scored); Ozan Özkan (penalty missed); Caner Ağca (penalty scored); Faruk Atalay (penalty missed) Aytekin Viduşlu (penalty missed); Nurullah Kaya (penalty scored); Sami İzcican (penalty scored); Ahmet Çağıran (penalty missed); Can Ulun (penalty scored); Levent Taşkın (penalty missed)		(penalty scored) Mile Jedinak; (penalty missed) Sedat Ağçay; (penalty missed) Hakan Özmert; (penalty scored) Serge Djiehoua; (penalty scored) Tita (penalty missed) Ali Zitouni; (penalty scored) Veysel Cihan; (penalty scored) Musa Nizam; (penalty missed) Ertuğrul Arslan; (penalty scored) Şenol Can; (penalty scored) Polat Keser

Source: 2009–10 Turkish Cup pages.

== Management ==
=== Club management ===
Mersin İdmanyurdu Sports Club president and managerial board members are elected by general vote of club members. Last election was held in September 2008.

- Executive committee:President : Ali Kahramanlı since September 2008. Football Division Manager: Mehmet Işık (replaced resigning Mustafa Ağaoğlu in December 2009).

=== Coaching team ===
- Before 10 February 2010: Coach: Serhat Güller. Trainers: Enver Şen, Alper Şemsi Edis, Ahmet Arslaner, Mehmet Varlıer (goalkeeping trainer). Sports Director: Ahmet Yıldırım, since August 2009.
- After 10 February 2010: Coach: Ergün Penbe. Trainers: Kemalettin Şentürk, Volkan Kilimci, and Ali Asım. U-14 team coach: Serkan Damla. Advisor: Bülent Uygun

2009–10 Mersin İdmanyurdu head coaches

Nat	Head coach	Period	Pl	W	D	L	Notes
(Turkey)	Serhat Güller	19.08.2009 – 10.02.2010	24	9	2	13	Left after 21st round.
(Turkey)	Ergün Penbe	12.02.2010 – 31.05.2010	13	4	6	3	Contract ended at the end of the season.

Note: Only official games were included.

== 2009–10 squad ==
Appearances, goals and cards count for 2009–10 TFF First League and 2009–10 Turkish Cup games. Serial penalties were not included in goal statistics. Kit numbers were allowed to be selected by players. 18 players appeared in each game roster, three to be replaced. Only the players who appeared in game rosters were included and listed in order of appearance.

O	N	Nat	Name	Birth	Born	Pos	LA	LG	CA	CG	TA	TG	Booked	Sent off (straight red)	← Season Notes →
1	1	(Turkey)	Kerem İnan	25 Mar 1980	Istanbul	GK	33				33		8		2009 ST Karşıyaka.
2	38	(Turkey)	Mustafa Tuna Kaya	3 Feb 1984	Tomarza	DF	29	3	1		30	3	4	1	→ previous season.
3	26	(Turkey)	Zafer Şahin	29 Dec 1977	Ankara	DF	22	2	2	2	24	4	8		2009 ST Diyarbakırspor.
4	16	(Turkey)	Ahmet Çağıran	15 Jun 1968	Bursa	DF	25	1	2	1	27	2	2		2009 ST Karşıyaka.
5	55	(Turkey)	Can Ulun	26 Jan 1983	Samsun	DF	8		1		9		2		2009 ST Samsunspor.
6	10	(Turkey)	Ramazan Durdu	1 Jan 1983	Esenköy	MF	27	2	2	1	29	3	5		2009 ST K. Erciyesspor.
7	7	(Turkey)	Aytekin Viduşlu (C)	28 Aug 1978	Manisa	MF	27		1		28		2		2009 ST Orduspor.
8	20	(Turkey)	Mehmet Düz	13 Jan 1988	Berlin	FW	13		3	1	16	1	1		2009 ST Galatasaray.
9	35	(Turkey)	Caner Ağca	28 Oct 1984	İzmir	MF	31	7	1		32	7	3	1	2009 ST Ankaraspor.
10	11	(Turkey)	Zafer Demiray	19 Oct 1976	Berlin	MF	18	1			18	1	1		2009 ST Karşıyaka.
11	54	(Turkey)	Serkan İrdem	5 May 1983	Adapazarı	FW	25	3			25	3	5		2009 ST Karşıyaka.
12	99	(Turkey)	Levent Taşkın	27 Jan 1977	Ankara	GK	3				3				→ previous season.
13	22	(Turkey)	Ozan Özkan	11 Jun 1984	Muğla	DF	10		3		13		4		2009 ST Denizlispor.
14	4	(Turkey)	Erdal Sezek	10 Jan 1980	Kiğı	DF	8				8		2	2	→ previous season.
15	8	(Turkey)	Nurullah Kaya	20 Jul 1986	Batman	MF	21	4	3		24	4	3		→ previous season.
16	17	(Turkey)	Tunç Behram	21 Jul 1990	Mersin	FW	28	5	3	2	31	7	5		→ previous season.
17	62	(Turkey)	Sertaç Şahin	23 Jul 1983	İnebolu	MF	19		3		22		4		→ previous season.
18	61	(Turkey)	Faruk Atalay	18 Mar 1981	Of	MF	3		3	1	6	1	1		→ previous season.
19	9	(Turkey)	Sami İzcican	19 Oct 1983	Van	FW	19	2	2		21	2	2		→ previous season.
20	33	(Turkey)	Fuat Onur	20 Jan 1987	Altınözü	DF	22	1	2	1	24	2	1		→ previous season.
21	90	(Turkey)	Birol Parlak	1 Mar 1990	Pazar	FW	5		1		6		1		→ previous season.
22	25	(Turkey)	Güngör Tuğcu	15 Sep 1981	Üsküdar	DF	2		2		4		1		2009 ST Malatyaspor.
23	18	(Cameroon)	Aime Emo	6 Aug 1988	Douala	FW			2		2		1		2009 ST Bursaspor.
24	6	(Turkey)	Murat Uluç	15 May 1981	Bornova	FW	17	3	1		18	3	7		2009 ST Çaykur Rizespor.
25	88	(Cameroon)	Raymond Ndong	23 Mar 1988	Douala	FW			1		1				2009 ST abroad.
26	19	(Turkey)	Anıl Gezer	31 Jul 1990	Erdemli	DF									→ previous season.
27	91	(Turkey)	Emre Gürbüz	25 Mar 1991	Mersin	DF									2009 ST E. Şekerspor.
28	3	(Cameroon)	Joseph Boum	26 Sep 1989	Yaoundé	DF	10				10		2		2010 WT Tatlısu Halkodası.
29	77	(Turkey)	Sertaç Güzel	19 Jun 1990	Mersin	GK									First time professional.
30	89	(Turkey)	Mustafa Aydın	30 Apr 1986	Bakırköy	DF	11	1			11	1	5		2010 WL MKE Ankaragücü.
31	5	(Turkey)	Fatih Egedik	2 May 1982	Karşıyaka	DF	14				14		4		2010 WT Konyaspor.
32	23	(Turkey)	Kaya Tarakçı	23 Apr 1981	Adana	GK	1				1				2010 WT Adana Demirspor.
33	14	(Turkey)	Fatih Şen	10 Aug 1979	Bafra	FW	13	2			13	2	3		2010 WT Giresunspor.
34	92	(Turkey)	Onur Karakabak	8 Apr 1992	Zonguldak	DF	10				10		1		2010 WL Fenerbahçe.
35	13	(Turkey)	Vedat Çoban	8 Sep 1984	Tatvan	MF									2010 WT Kastamonuspor.
36	21	(Brazil)	Alex Wilton	10 Jun 1987	Morada	FW	2				2				2010 WT abroad.
37	39	(Turkey)	Cenker Pehlivan	15 Nov 1990	Lüleburgaz	FW									→ previous season.

Sources: TFF club page and Maçkolik team page.

== U-23 team ==
TFF organized A2 League in 2009–10 season. Süper Lig and 1. Lig teams participated in this league. League was organized in four geographical groups and top two teams are labeled for play-off group. Mersin İdmanyurdu A2 team took place in Güney (South) group with other eight southern and central Anatolian cities' teams.

	Week	Position	Played	Win	Draw	Lost	For	Against	Diff.	Points
First quarter	9	9	8	1	1	6	3	17	-14	4
Second quarter	18	8	16	3	2	11	13	32	-19	11
Third quarter	27	7	24	6	4	14	23	46	-23	22
Fourth quarter	36	6	32	8	7	17	27	54	-27	31

== See also ==
- Football in Turkey
- 2009–10 TFF First League
- 2009–10 Turkish Cup
