= 2008–09 Mersin İdmanyurdu season =

Mersin İdmanyurdu
2008–09 season
- President: Hüseyin Çalışkan (till 24 September 2008); Ali Kahramanlı (since 24 September 2008)
- Head coach: Ercan Albay
- Stadium: Tevfik Sırrı Gür Stadium; Mersin, Turkey
- TFF Second League: Ranking Group 3: 2nd Promotion Group: 2nd
- 2008–09 Turkish Cup: Did not participate
- Top goalscorer: League: Zafer Biryol (16); All: Zafer Biryol (16)

Mersin İdmanyurdu (also Mersin İdman Yurdu, Mersin İY, or MİY) Sports Club; located in Mersin, east Mediterranean coast of Turkey in 2008–09. The team participated in TFF Second League for 4th time in the league's 7th season. Mersin İdmanyurdu has finished 2007–08 TFF Second League Promotion Group at 2nd place and directly promoted to 2009–10 TFF First League season.

Hüseyin Çalışkan was club president at the start of the season. On 24 September 2008, Ali Kahramanlı was elected president. Ercan Albay managed the team during the season. Erdal Sezek and Sami İzcican were most appeared (36) players, while Zafer Biryol was the top goalscorer with 16 goals.

== 2008–09 TFF Second League participation ==
Mersin idmanyurdu participated in 2008–09 TFF Second League (the league has been played under the name of "Second League Category B" between 2001–02 and 2005–06; "TFF League B" in 2006–07; and "TFF Second League" since 2007–08. Also sponsor names have been included in various seasons.). League was played by 54 teams in three stages. League was started on 31 August 2008. In the first stage teams fought in regionally specified five ranking groups (10 teams in Group 5, 11 teams in 1,2,3, and 4th Groups) for top two rankings to be qualified for Promotion Group in the next stage. In the second stage 10 teams fought for promotion to 2009–10 TFF First League. Champions and runners-up directly were promoted. Remaining (8 in Group 5; 9 in other groups) teams played in Classification Groups. Classification group winners were qualified to promotion play-offs, while bottom two teams relegated to 2009–10 TFF Third League. In the third stage, the third team to be promoted was determined in promotion-play-offs played in one-leg elimination system in a neutral venue. Play-offs were played by 8 teams (three from promotion group, 5 from each classification groups) in Ankara Cebeci İnönü Stadium between 26 and 31 May 2009.

Mersin İdmanyurdu took place in 2008–09 TFF Second League Ranking Group 3 in the first stage and finished 2nd. In Promotion Group, team finished at 2nd again and gained direct promotion to 2009–10 TFF First League.

=== Results summary ===
Mersin İdmanyurdu (MİY) 2008–09 TFF Second League season league summary:

	Overall									Home								Away							
Stage	Pc	Pl	W	D	L	GF	GA	GD	Pt	Pl	W	D	L	GF	GA	GD	Pt	Pl	W	D	L	GF	GA	GD	Pt
Ranking Group	2	20	9	8	3	30	17	+13	35	10	6	3	1	18	8	+10	21	10	3	5	2	12	9	+3	14
Promotion Group	2	18	9	4	5	26	14	+12	31	9	6	1	2	15	4	+11	19	9	3	3	3	11	10	+1	12
Overall		38	18	12	8	56	31	+25	66	19	12	4	3	33	12	+21	40	19	6	8	5	23	19	+4	26

Sources: 2008–09 TFF Second League pages.

=== Ranking group league table ===
Mersin İY's league performance in 2008–09 TFF Second League Ranking Group 3 is shown in the following table.

Pc	Team	Games				Goals		Pts	Home			Away		
Pc	Team	Pl	W	D	L	F	A	Pts	F–A	R	Pc	F–A	R	Pc
1	Beykozspor 1908 (Q)	20	10	7	3	24	15	37	2–0	2	1	0–1	13	1
2	Mersin İdmanyurdu (Q)	20	9	8	3	30	17	35		14	2		3	4
3	Zeytinburnuspor	20	8	6	6	21	19	30	3–0	17	2	2–0	6	2
4	Konya Şekerspor	20	6	9	5	22	21	27	0–0	5	3	4–4	16	2
5	Türk Telekomspor	20	6	8	6	18	16	26	2–1	9	1	0–2	20	2
6	Kırşehirspor	20	6	8	6	16	17	26	2–1	19	2	1–1	8	1
7	İstanbulspor	20	6	7	7	19	17	25	2–1	12	1	1–1	1	5
8	MKE Kırıkkalespor	20	5	8	7	19	22	23	1–2	21	2	2–0	10	1
9	Etimesgut Şekerspor	20	3	11	6	18	22	20	1–1	15	2	1–1	4	5
10	Maltepespor	20	5	5	10	18	35	20	4–1	7	1	2–0	18	2
11	Alibeyköyspor	20	2	11	7	17	21	17	1–1	11	1	0–0	22	2

Three points for a win. Rules for classification: 1) points; 2) tie-break; 3) goal difference; 4) number of goals scored. In the score columns first scores belong to MİY.
(Q): Qualified to 2008–09 Second League Promotion Group.
Source: 2008–09 TFF Second League pages from TFF website, Turkish-Soccer website, and Maçkolik website.

=== Ranking group games ===
Mersin İdmanyurdu (MİY) 2008–09 TFF Second League season first half game reports in Ranking Group 2 is shown in the following table. Kick off times are in EET and EEST.

31 August 2008 Round 1	İstanbulspor	1 – 1	Mersin İdmanyurdu	İÖİ Stadium, Bahçelievler, Istanbul
Sunday, 17:00	Savaş Yıldızhan 78' (F); Metin Hartamacı (yellow card) 39' (red card); Arif Morkaya (yellow card) 89' (red card)	Report	36' (F) Zafer Biryol; (yellow card) 5' Zafer Sağdıç	Referee: Hasan Küpeli

7 September 2008 Round 2	Mersin İdmanyurdu	2 – 0	Beykozspor 1908	Tevfik Sırrı Gür Stadium, Mersin
Sunday, 16:00	Zafer Biryol 2' (F); Sami İzcican 37' (F); Ercan Naşal (yellow card) 55'; Levent Taşkın (yellow card) 79'; Veysel Kılıç (yellow card) 87'	Report	(yellow card) 6' Hayati Sarıkaya; (yellow card) 17' Erkan Aygün; (yellow card) 32' Erhan Şentürk	Referee: Hüseyin Çiftsüren

11 September 2008 Round 3	BYE	v	Mersin İdmanyurdu
Thursday, 16:00

21 September 2008 Round 4	Etimesgut Şekerspor	1 – 1	Mersin İdmanyurdu	Ostim Stadium, Ankara
Sunday, 16:00	Mustafa Karabulut 52' (F); Cengiz Çoban (yellow card) 48'; Çağlar Yıldızer (yellow card) 58'; Hüseyin Kala (yellow card) 89'	Report	44' (F) Faruk Atalay; (yellow card) 35' Cihan Gökal; (yellow card) 44' Zafer Biryol; (yellow card) 76' Erdal Sezek; (yellow card) 83' Zafer Sağdıç; (yellow card) 88' Sami İzcican	Referee: Serkan Tokat

28 September 2008 Round 5	Mersin İdmanyurdu	0 – 0	Konya Şekerspor	Tevfik Sırrı Gür Stadium, Mersin
Sunday, 15:00	Onur Güney (yellow card) 75'; Zafer Sağdıç (red card) 49'	Report	(yellow card) 55' Kenan Başkan; (yellow card) 82' Serkan Reçber	Referee: Mehmet Nevzat Adal

1 October 2008 Round 6	Zeytinburnuspor	0 – 2	Mersin İdmanyurdu	Z. burnu Stadium, Z. burnu, Istanbul
Wednesday, 15:00	Harun Levent Halhallı (red card) 35'; Mustafa Gürel (yellow card) 68'; Fatih Kocaadam (yellow card) 90'	Report	36' (P) Veysel Kılıç; 70' (F) Altan Aksoy; (yellow card) 35' Levent Taşkın; (red card) 35' Zafer Biryol; (yellow card) 43' Mehmet Çolak; (yellow card) 89' Emre Horoslu; (yellow card) 89' (red card) Sertaç Şahin	Referee: Ercan Hellaç

5 October 2008 Round 7	Mersin İdmanyurdu	4 – 1	Maltepespor	Tevfik Sırrı Gür Stadium, Mersin
Sunday, 15:00	Sami İzcican 26' (F); Nurullah Kaya 49' (F); Zafer Sağdıç 68' (F); Sami İzcican 75' (F); Emre Horoslu (yellow card) 32'; Ercan Naşal (yellow card) 86'	Report	83' (H) Gürkan İzmirlioğlu; (yellow card) 56' Ali Işık	Referee: Ferdi Uludağ

12 October 2008 Round 8	Kırşehirspor	0 – 0	Mersin İdmanyurdu	Kırşehir Ahi Stadium, Kırşehir
Sunday, 15:00		Report	(yellow card) 77' (red card) Hakan Genç; (yellow card) 80' Evren Gayır	Referee: Ali Şükrü Beldüz

15 October 2008 Round 9	Mersin İdmanyurdu	2 – 1	Türk Telekomspor	Tevfik Sırrı Gür Stadium, Mersin
Wednesday, 15:00	Altan Aksoy 4' (H); Zafer Biryol (yellow card) 7'; Mehmet Çolak (yellow card) 39'; Veysel Kılıç (yellow card) 43'; Onur Güney (yellow card) 52'; Cihan Gökal (yellow card) 77'	Report	35' (o.g.) Ahmet Çenet; 36' (F) Doğan Altınkaya	Referee: Harun Yücedağ

26 October 2008 Round 10	MKE Kırıkkalespor	0 – 2	Mersin İdmanyurdu	Fikret Karabudak Stadium, Kırıkkale
Sunday, 14:00	Sezai Sezgin 86' (o.g.); Sezai Sezgin (yellow card) 73'; Gökhan Aydın (yellow card) 75'; Coşkun Ağrı (yellow card) 78'	Report	88' (F) Altan Aksoy; (yellow card) 23' Altan Aksoy; (yellow card) 65' Nurullah Kaya	Referee: Volkan Alabaş

2 November 2008 Round 11	Mersin İdmanyurdu	1 – 1	Alibeyköyspor	Tevfik Sırrı Gür Stadium, Mersin
Sunday, 14:00	Altan Aksoy 27' (F); Altan Aksoy (yellow card) 52'; Levent Taşkın (yellow card) 80'	Report	81' (F) Sinan Közen; (yellow card) 23' Gökhan Gülfidan; (yellow card) 65' Ersin Akkemik; (yellow card) 82' Engin Özçelik	Referee: Hasan Küpeli

5 November 2008 Round 12	Mersin İdmanyurdu	2 – 1	İstanbulspor	Tevfik Sırrı Gür Stadium, Mersin
Wednesday, 14:00	Zafer Biryol 15' (H); Zafer Biryol 64' (F); Veysel Kılıç (yellow card) 16'; Cihan Gökal (yellow card) 83'	Report	89' (F) Metin Hartamacı; (yellow card) 25' Metin Hartamacı; (yellow card) 36' Deniz Durmuş; (yellow card) 85' Mehmet Sait Ulucan; (yellow card) 88' Cemil Vatansever	Referee: Özgür Sepin

9 November 2008 Round 13	Beykozspor 1908	1 – 0	Mersin İdmanyurdu	Beykoz Stadium, Beykoz, Istanbul
Sunday, 14:00	Mustafa Demir 23' (H); Samet Yüksel (yellow card) 28'; Hakan Arslanağız (yellow card) 69'	Report	(yellow card) 66' Erdal Sezek; (yellow card) 84' Faruk Atalay; (yellow card) 89' Emre Horoslu	Referee: Yaşar Kemal Uğurlu

16 November 2008 Round 14	Mersin İdmanyurdu	v	BYE
Sunday, 14:00

20 November 2008 Round 15	Mersin İdmanyurdu	1 – 1	Etimesgut Şekerspor	Tevfik Sırrı Gür Stadium, Mersin
Thursday, 14:00	Erdal Sezek 72' (H); Erdal Sezek (yellow card) 21'; Faruk Atalay (yellow card) 88'	Report	83' (F) Serkan Pala; (yellow card) 19' Cengiz Çoban; (yellow card) 40' Ali Kıbıç; (yellow card) 71' Özgür Çelik; (yellow card) 86' İrfan Yazıcı	Referee: Yalçın Köroğlu

26 November 2008 Round 16	Konya Şekerspor	4 – 4	Mersin İdmanyurdu	BB Atatürk Stadium, Konya
Wednesday, 13:30	Faruk Temel 11' (P); Anıl Abanoz 23' (F); Faruk Temel 26' (F); Faruk Temel 64' (F); Faruk Temel (yellow card) 18'; İskender Köksal (yellow card) 32'; Can Parlayan (yellow card) 62'; Mehmet Uslu (yellow card) 83'; Emre Köksal (yellow card) 87'	Report	6' (F) Sami İzcican; 7' (F) Sami İzcican; 41' (F) Veysel Kılıç; 88' (P) Cihan Gökal; (yellow card) 11' Onur Güney; (yellow card) 16' Mehmet Çolak; (yellow card) 73' Faruk Atalay	Referee: Adem Sarıtaş

30 November 2008 Round 17	Mersin İdmanyurdu	3 – 0	Zeytinburnuspor	Tevfik Sırrı Gür Stadium, Mersin
Sunday, 13:30	Zafer Biryol 31' (F); Sami İzcican 33' (H); Cihan Gökal 63' (F); Zafer Biryol (yellow card) 38'	Report	(yellow card) 25' Mustafa Soytaş; (yellow card) 44' Durmuş Ali Öz; (yellow card) 72' Caner Nurgör; (yellow card) 79' Savaş Yıldırım; (yellow card) 83' (red card) Rıdvan Okuş	Referee: Sacit Keşkek

7 December 2008 Round 18	Maltepespor	0 – 2	Mersin İdmanyurdu	H. Polat Stadium, Maltepe, Istanbul
Sunday, 13:30	Yasin Çelik (yellow card) 89'	Report	17' (H) Zafer Biryol; 80' (H) Sami İzcican; (yellow card) 80' Sami İzcican	Referee: Mehmet Berkant Mercanlı

14 December 2008 Round 19	Mersin İdmanyurdu	2 – 1	Kırşehirspor	Tevfik Sırrı Gür Stadium, Mersin
Sunday, 13:30	Zafer Biryol 48' (H); Faruk Atalay 53' (F); Faruk Atalay (yellow card) 40'; Cihan Gökal (yellow card) 45'; Orhan Terzi (yellow card) 60'; Zafer Biryol (yellow card) 65'; Sami İzcican (yellow card) 90'; Veysel Kılıç (yellow card) 90'	Report	78' (F) Eray Topçuoğlu; (yellow card) 26' Eser Yayla; (yellow card) 80' (red card) Samed Kartal	Referee: Erdem İren

17 December 2008 Round 20	Türk Telekomspor	2 – 0	Mersin İdmanyurdu	Türk Telekom Stadium, Ankara
Wednesday, 13:30	Ferdi Aksakal 35' (H); Hakan Akbaş (yellow card) 40'; Mehmet Tosak (yellow card) 42'; İsmet Taşdemir (yellow card) 71'	Report	73' (o.g.) Mehmet Çolak; (yellow card) 79' Sami İzcican; (yellow card) 87' Onur Güney; (yellow card) 89' Ercan Naşal; (yellow card) 89' Erdal Sezek; (yellow card) 89' Levent Taşkın	Referee: Kutluhan Bilgiç

21 December 2008 Round 21	Mersin İdmanyurdu	1 – 2	MKE Kırıkkalespor	Tevfik Sırrı Gür Stadium, Mersin
Sunday, 13:30	Fuat Onur 70' (H); Mehmet Çolak (yellow card) 46'; Ercan Naşal (yellow card) 78'; Emre Horoslu (yellow card) 82'	Report	71' (F) Lokman Akyıldız; 80' (F) Lokman Akyıldız; (yellow card) 81' Abdullah Yeşilyurt	Referee: Ekrem Gerginci

28 December 2008 Round 22	Alibeyköyspor	0 – 0	Mersin İdmanyurdu	Alibeyköy Stadium, Eyüp, Istanbul
Sunday, 13:30		Report		Referee: Hakkı Güler

Sources: 2008–09 TFF Second League pages.

=== Promotion group league table ===
Mersin İY's league performance in 2008–09 TFF Second League Promotion Group season is shown in the following table.

Pc	Team	Games				Goals		Pts	Home			Away		
Pc	Team	Pl	W	D	L	F	A	Pts	F–A	R	Pc	F–A	R	Pc
1	Bucaspor (C) (P)	18	11	4	3	34	21	37	0–1	9	2	2–1	18	2
2	Mersin İdmanyurdu (P)	18	9	4	5	26	14	31						
3	Tokatspor (Q)	18	8	5	5	27	28	29	5–0	3	3	0–1	12	2
4	Tarsus İdmanyurdu (Q)	18	7	7	4	34	27	28	2–1	7	1	1–1	16	2
5	Çorumspor (Q)	18	7	6	5	24	21	27	1–0	13	2	4–2	4	1
6	Belediye Vanspor	18	7	5	6	22	27	26	2–0	5	1	0–1	14	2
7	Körfez Belediyespor	18	5	7	6	19	24	22	0–1	2	6	1–1	11	2
8	Beykozspor 1908	18	5	5	8	26	23	20	1–1	17	2	0–1	8	2
9	Eyüpspor	18	4	7	7	24	24	19	3–0	15	2	1–1	6	1
10	Diyarbakır Büyükşehir Belediye Diskispor	18	0	4	14	14	37	4	1–0	10	2	2–1	1	2

Three points for a win. Rules for classification: 1) points; 2) tie-break; 3) goal difference; 4) number of goals scored. In the score columns first scores belong to MİY.
(C): Champions; (P): Promoted to 2009–10 TFF First League; (Q): Qualified to 2008–09 Promotion Play-offs.
Source: 2008–09 TFF Second League pages from TFF website, Turkish-Soccer website, and Maçkolik website.

=== Promotion group games ===
Mersin İdmanyurdu (MİY) 2008–09 TFF Second League season first half game reports in Promotion Group is shown in the following table. Kick off times are in EET and EEST.

18 January 2009 Round 1	Diyarbakır BB Diskispor	1 – 2	Mersin İdmanyurdu	Atatürk Stadium, Diyarbakır
Sunday, 13:30	Soner Çelen 75' (F); Erkan Vurhan (yellow card) 42'; Ali Kunter (yellow card) 44'	Report	42' (P) Zafer Biryol; 81' (H) Zafer Biryol; (yellow card) 32' Orhan Terzi; (yellow card) 36' Onur Güney; (yellow card) 44' Erdal Sezek; (yellow card) 55' Sami İzcican	Referee: Muhammet Başkan

25 January 2009 Round 2	Mersin İdmanyurdu	0 – 1	Körfez Belediyespor	Tevfik Sırrı Gür Stadium, Mersin
Sunday, 13:30	Zafer Biryol (yellow card) 33'	Report	47' (F) Murat Şahin; (yellow card) 44' (red card) Niyazi Hüseyinoğlu; (yellow card) 65' Salim Kaya	Referee: Burak Astar

1 February 2009 Round 3	Mersin İdmanyurdu	5 – 0	Tokatspor	Tevfik Sırrı Gür Stadium, Mersin
Sunday, 13:30	Sami İzcican 33' (F); Erdal Sezek 40' (F); Sami İzcican 25' (F); Faruk Atalay 79' (F); Nurullah Kaya 81' (F); Cumhur Bozacı (yellow card) 5'	Report	(yellow card) 9' Ferhat Doğruel; (yellow card) 15' Şamil Ünal; (yellow card) 17' Şahin Gökçe	Referee: Murat Özcan

8 February 2009 Round 4	Çorumspor	2 – 4	Mersin İdmanyurdu	T. Kılıçcıoğlu Stadium, Çorum
Sunday, 13:30	Hüseyin Sertaç Baydar 4' (F); Fatih Özdemir 68' (F); Hüseyin Yıldız (yellow card) 42'	Report	23' (F) Zafer Biryol; 39' (P) Zafer Biryol; 86' (H) Abdullah Halman; 89' (F) Zafer Biryol; (yellow card) 18' Hakan Delil; (yellow card) 56' Faruk Atalay	Referee: Yusuf Yılmaz

15 February 2009 Round 5	Mersin İdmanyurdu	2 – 0	Belediye Vanspor	Tevfik Sırrı Gür Stadium, Mersin
Sunday, 13:30	Abdullah Halman 68' (F); Nurullah Kaya 86' (F); Zafer Biryol (yellow card) 36'; Abdullah Halman (yellow card) 90'	Report	(yellow card) 36' Soner Taban	Referee: Mehmet Gonca

22 February 2009 Round 6	Eyüpspor	1 – 1	Mersin İdmanyurdu	Eyüp Stadium, Eyüp, Istanbul
Sunday, 13:30	Ali Tuna Tanyıldız 5' (F); Ali Tuna Tanyıldız (yellow card) 17'; Murat Aydoğdu (yellow card) 51'; Serhat Karakayalar (yellow card) 89'	Report	3' (F) Nurullah Kaya; (yellow card) 32' Cumhur Bozacı; (yellow card) 41' Nurullah Kaya; (yellow card) 51' Erdal Sezek	Referee: Volkan Alabaş

1 March 2009 Round 7	Mersin İdmanyurdu	2 – 1	Tarsus İdmanyurdu	Tevfik Sırrı Gür Stadium, Mersin
Sunday, 13:30	Zafer Biryol 7' (F); Abdullah Halman 8' (F); Cihan Gökal (yellow card) 50'; Levent Taşkın (yellow card) 89'; Tuna Kaya (yellow card) 89'	Report	24' (F) İshak Topçu; (yellow card) 5' Cemal Taşlı	Referee: Hasan Küpeli

8 March 2009 Round 8	Beykozspor 1908	1 – 0	Mersin İdmanyurdu	Beykoz Stadium, Beykoz, Istanbul
Sunday 13:30	Recai Yakut 50' (F); Samet Gören (yellow card) 30'	Report	(yellow card) 22' Nurullah Kaya; (yellow card) 70' Faruk Atalay	Referee: Mesut Carık

15 March 2009 Round 9	Mersin İdmanyurdu	0 – 1	Bucaspor	Tevfik Sırrı Gür Stadium, Mersin
Sunday, 13:30	Zafer Sağdıç (yellow card) 3'; Cihan Gökal (yellow card) 45'; Faruk Atalay (yellow card) 50'; Orhan Terzi (yellow card) 51'; Zafer Biryol (yellow card) 79'; Erdal Sezek (yellow card) 87'	Report	78' (H) Erman Özcan; (yellow card) 8' Yılmaz Özlem; (yellow card) 75' Erman Özcan	Referee: Çetin Topuz

23 March 2009 Round 10	Mersin İdmanyurdu	1 – 0	Diyarbakır BB Diskispor	Tevfik Sırrı Gür Stadium, Mersin
Monday, 13:30	Abdullah Halman 5' (F); Cihan Gökal (yellow card) 86'	Report	(yellow card) 63' (red card) Mahmut Hançerli	Referee: Serdar Karakaş

28 March 2009 Round 11	Körfez Belediyespor	1 – 1	Mersin İdmanyurdu	A. Türkeş Stadium, İzmit, Kocaeli
Saturday, 13:30	Yunus Söylemez 24' (H); Murat Şahin (yellow card) 20'; Niyazi Hüseyinoğlu (red card) 30'; Kerem Türker (yellow card) 68'; Ender Doğramacı (yellow card) 72'; Cüneyt Yis (yellow card) 80'	Report	44' (F) Zafer Biryol; (yellow card) 30' Fuat Onur; (yellow card) 30' Zafer Biryol; (yellow card) 52' Erdal Sezek; (yellow card) 65' Sertaç Şahin	Referee: Bilal Kunt

5 April 2009 Round 12	Tokatspor	1 – 0	Mersin İdmanyurdu	Gaziosmanpaşa Stadium, Tokat
Sunday, 14:30	Arif Çoban 21' (F); Şahin Gökçe (yellow card) 70'; Atilla Birlik (yellow card) 85'	Report	(yellow card) 40' Nurullah Kaya	Referee: Osman Yiğit Uzer

12 April 2009 Round 13	Mersin İdmanyurdu	1 – 0	Çorumspor	Tevfik Sırrı Gür Stadium, Mersin
Sunday, 14:30	Sami İzcican 73' (F); Sami İzcican (yellow card) 42'; Tuna Kaya (yellow card) 45'; Cumhur Bozacı (yellow card) 58'; Cihan Gökal (yellow card) 76'; Erdal Sezek (yellow card) 79'; Sertaç Şahin (yellow card) 85'; Orhan Terzi (red card) 86'	Report	(yellow card) 7' Mutlu İlengöz; (yellow card) 44' Serdar Bayrak; (yellow card) 73' Gökhan Kül	Referee: Erdoğan Özkaya

19 April 2009 Round 14	Belediye Vanspor	1 – 0	Mersin İdmanyurdu	Van Atatürk Stadium, Van
Sunday, 13:00	Aydın Tabak 75' (F); Mehmet Yılmaz (yellow card) 37'; Aydın Tabak (yellow card) 76'; Mesut Özkalkan (yellow card) 80'	Report	(yellow card) 6' Faruk Atalay; (yellow card) 26' Abdullah Halman; (yellow card) 59' Fuat Onur; (yellow card) 72' Ercan Naşal	Referee: Mustafa Öğretmenoğlu

26 April 2009 Round 15	Mersin İdmanyurdu	3 – 0	Eyüpspor	Tevfik Sırrı Gür Stadium, Mersin
Sunday, 15:30	Cihan Gökal 13' (F); Zafer Biryol 42' (F); Altan Aksoy 89' (F); Cumhur Bozacı (yellow card) 53'; Tuna Kaya (yellow card) 59'	Report	(red card) 40' Uğurtan Çepni; (yellow card) 73' Murat Aydoğdu	Referee: Zafer Koçbay

3 May 2009 Round 16	Tarsus İdmanyurdu	1 – 1	Mersin İdmanyurdu	B. Kocamaz Stadium, Tarsus, Mersin
Sunday, 15:30	Şenol Erol 46' (H); Önder Tezcan (yellow card) 68'; Özcan Dağ (yellow card) 86'; Abdulkadir Ünver (yellow card) 87'; Kemal Özyurt (yellow card) 89'	Report	89' (F) Sertaç Şahin; (yellow card) 8' Erdal Sezek; (yellow card) 89' Cumhur Bozacı; (yellow card) 89' Levent Taşkın; (yellow card) 89' Zafer Biryol	Referee: Deniz Çoban

10 May 2009 Round 17	Mersin İdmanyurdu	1 – 1	Beykozspor 1908	Tevfik Sırrı Gür Stadium, Mersin
Sunday, 15:30	Cumhur Bozacı 18' (F); Cumhur Bozacı (yellow card) 10'; Cihan Gökal (yellow card) 50'; Erdal Sezek (yellow card) 82'	Report	8' (F) Recai Yakut; (yellow card) 62' Caner Eryiğit; (yellow card) 76' Cihan Erdil; (yellow card) 88' Recai Yakut	Referee: Hasan Küpeli

17 May 2009 Round 18	Bucaspor	1 – 2	Mersin İdmanyurdu	New Buca Stadium, Buca, İzmir
Sunday, 15:30	Yılmaz Özlem 34' (F); Ramazan Altıntepe (yellow card) 86'	Report	15' (F) Faruk Atalay; 89' (F) Zafer Biryol; 88' Cihan Gökal	Referee: Abdullah Yılmaz

Sources: 2008–09 TFF Second League pages.

== 2008–09 Turkish Cup participation ==
MİY did not participate in 2008–09 Turkish Cup due to eligibility rules. 47th Turkish Cup (played as Fortis Türkiye Kupası for sponsorship purposes) was played by 54 teams in three stages. Top four teams in previous year's TFF Second League groups were eligible to play. MİY had finished 2007–08 season in 6th place was not eligible to play in the Cup. In the first stage two qualification rounds were played in one-leg elimination system. In the second stage (group stage) 20 teams played in four groups, 5 teams in each, in a one-leg round-robin system. Top two teams in each group played in knock-out stage. Beşiktaş won the cup for the 8th time.

== Management ==
=== Club management ===
Hüseyin Çalışkan was club president at the start of the season. Ali Kahramanlı, a businessman, was elected president in the club congress held on 24 September 2008 after fourth round in the first stage.

=== Coaching team ===
Ercan Albay managed the team during the season. He was commonly mentioned with Adana sides who were main rivals of the fans, so he met with reaction, but he come down to the history of the club by the promotion to upper league in this season.

2008–09 Mersin İdmanyurdu head coaches

Nat	Head coach	Period	Pl	W	D	L	Notes
(Turkey)	Ercan Albay	14.08.2008 – 31.05.2009	38	18	12	8	Contract ended at the end of the season.

Note: Only official games were included.

== 2008–09 squad ==
Appearances, goals and cards count for 2008–09 TFF Second League Ranking and Promotion Group games. This season optional kit numbers selected by players were allowed for the first time in the league's history. 18 players appeared in each game roster, three to be replaced. Only the players who appeared in game rosters were included and listed in order of appearance.

O	N	Nat	Name	Birth	Born	Pos	LA	LG	CA	CG	TA	TG	Booked	Sent off (straight red)	← Season Notes →
1	99	(Turkey)	Levent Taşkın	27 Jan 1977	Ankara	GK	35				35		6		→ previous season.
2	44	(Turkey)	Zafer Sağdıç	20 Jul 1976	Malatya	DF	20	1			20	1	3	1	→ previous season.
3	28	(Turkey)	Cihan Gökal	3 Nov 1981	Trabzon	DF	28	3			28	3	10		2008 ST Etimesgut Şekerspor.
4	4	(Turkey)	Erdal Sezek	10 Jan 1980	Kiğı	DF	36	2			36	2	11		2008 ST Etimesgut Şekerspor.
5	35	(Turkey)	Orhan Terzi	31 Dec 1979	İzmir	DF	22				22		3	1	→ previous season.
6	21	(Turkey)	Ercan Naşal	15 Oct 1983	Hazro	MF	24				24		5		2008 ST DBB Diskispor.
7	62	(Turkey)	Sertaç Şahin	23 Jul 1983	İnebolu	MF	33	1			33	1	2	1	→ previous season.
8	6	(Turkey)	Faruk Atalay	18 Mar 1981	Of	MF	27	4			27	4	8		2008 ST Fatih Karagümrük.
9	8	(Turkey)	Zafer Biryol	2 Oct 1976	Rize	FW	30	16			30	16	9	1	2008 ST Çaykur Rizespor.
10	72	(Turkey)	Nurullah Kaya	20 Jul 1986	Batman	MF	26	4			26	4	4		→ previous season.
11	65	(Turkey)	Sami İzcican	19 Oct 1983	Van	FW	36	10			36	10	6		→ previous season.
12	67	(Turkey)	Burak Onur	5 Apr 1986	Devrek	GK	3				3				2008 ST Türk Telekomspor.
13	87	(Turkey)	Veysel Kılıç	7 Sep 1987	Seyhan	MF	20	2			20	2	4		→ previous season.
14	27	(Turkey)	Ferit Karataş	15 Sep 1980	Araban	FW	12				12				→ previous season.
15	22	(Turkey)	Emre Horoslu	25 May 1980	Bolu	DF	6				6		4		2008 ST Diyarbakırspor.
16	5	(Turkey)	Onur Güney	10 Dec 1982	Kozan	DF	30				30		5		→ previous season.
17	90	(Turkey)	Birol Parlak	1 Mar 1990	Pazar	FW	14				14				→ previous season.
18	3	(Turkey)	Mehmet Çolak	17 Mar 1979	Mersin	DF	14				14		4		→ previous season.
19	10	(Turkey)	Altan Aksoy	5 Feb 1976	Rize	MF	22	5			22	5	2		2008 ST Çaykur Rizespor.
20	11	(Turkey)	Hakan Delil	23 Jan 1981	Bakırköy	MF	21				21		1		2008 ST Karabükspor.
21	13	(Turkey)	Hakan Genç	13 Jul 1980	Merzifon	MF	8				8			1	2008 ST Karabükspor.
22	34	(Turkey)	Evren Gayır	12 Aug 1982	Beykoz	MF	1				1		1		→ previous season.
23	33	(Turkey)	Fuat Onur	20 Jan 1987	Altınözü	DF	17	1			17	1	2		→ previous season.
24	91	(Turkey)	Emre Kanağı	6 Feb 1991	Batman	GK									2008 ST Batman Petrolspor.
25	63	(Turkey)	Metin İmece	22 Mar 1988	Mersin	MF	2				2				→ previous season.
26	38	(Turkey)	Tuna Kaya	3 Feb 1984	Tomarza	DF	16				16		3		2009 WT Kayseri Erciyesspor.
27	1	(Turkey)	Ünal Odabaş	10 Mar 1974	Trabzon	GK									2009 WT Konya Şekerspor.
28	53	(Turkey)	Cumhur Bozacı	23 Aug 1974	Pazar	MF	15	1			15	1	6		2009 WT Eskişehirspor.
29	9	(Turkey)	Abdullah Halman	15 Aug 1987	Şanlıurfa	FW	13	4			13	4	2		2009 WL Eskişehirspor.

Sources: TFF club page and maçkolik team page.

== U-18 team ==
TFF organized Deplasmanlı Süper Gençler Ligi (DSGL) (Round-robin Super Youth League) in 2008–09. League was formed by 10 regional groups. Mersin İdmanyurdu U-18 team took place in Adana Group with 12 other teams from clubs that participated that year in professional leagues. MİY youth team finished 2nd after Adana Demirspor.

	Week	Position	Played	Win	Draw	Lost	For	Against	Diff.	Points
First half	13	1	12	9	3	0	26	6	20	30
Second half	26	2	24	16	6	2	53	18	35	54

Being runners-up of Adana Group, MİY U-18 team promoted to national group stage, where three teams played elimination games. MİY eliminated Şanlıurfaspor 1-0 (a.e.t) and Tokatspor 7-6 (1-1 and 6-5 pen.) in Group B. The group B games were played in Kahramanmaraş. In quarter-finals MİY U-18 team lost to Gaziantepspor 1-2 in Istanbul and was eliminated. Later Gaziantepspor was eliminated at semi-finals.

== See also ==
- Football in Turkey
