= Karakoç =

Karakoç is a Turkish word. It may refer to:

== People ==
- Murat Karakoç (born 1979), Turkish footballer
- Pınar Karakoç (born 1972), birth name for Turkish Singer Pınar Ayhan
- Sezai Karakoç (1933–2021), Turkish poet
- Yavuz Karakoç (born 1988), Turkish ice hockey player

== Places ==
- Karakoç, Çaycuma, a village in Çaycuma district of Zonguldak Province, Turkey
- Karakoç, Pazaryolu
- Şehit Burak Karakoç, Pasinler
