= Parlak =

Parlak is a Turkish surname. Notable people with the surname include:

- Başak Parlak (born 1989), Turkish actress and model
- Birol Parlak (born 1990), Turkish footballer
- Demet Parlak (born 1990), Turkish female pole vaulter
- İbrahim Parlak, Turkish refugee
- İlhan Parlak (born 1987), Turkish footballer
