= Aytekin =

Aytekin is a Turkish masculine given name and surname. Notable people with the name include:

== Given name ==
- Aytekin Kotil (1934–1992), Turkish politician
- Aytekin Mindan (born 1981), Turkish swimmer
- Aytekin Viduşlu (born 1978), Turkish footballer

== Surname ==
- Deniz Aytekin (born 1978), German football referee of Turkish descent
- Ensar Aytekin (born 1972), Turkish financial advisor and politician
