= Abrans =

Abrans may refer to:

- Historic name of Kuymaklı, Pazaryolu, Turkey
- Historic name of Akbulut, Aydıntepe, Turkey
