= Cevizlidere, Pazaryolu =

Village in Turkey

Cevizlidere
- Neighbourhood
- Location in Turkey
- Coordinates: 40.4715°N 40.6847°E
- Country: Turkey
- Province: Erzurum
- District: Pazaryolu
- Population (2022): 22
- Time zone: UTC+3 (TRT)

Cevizlidere is a neighbourhood in the municipality and district of Pazaryolu, Erzurum Province in Turkey. Its population is 22 (2022).
