= Pazaryolu =

- District and municipality
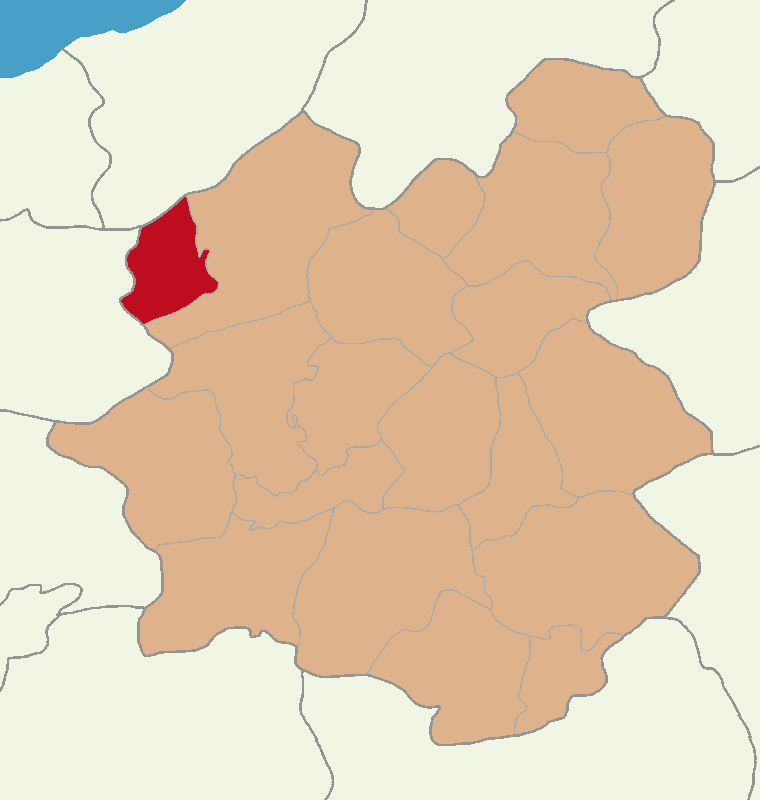
- Map showing Pazaryolu District in Erzurum Province

- Location within Turkey
- Coordinates: 40°24′59″N 40°46′16″E
- Country: Turkey
- Province: Erzurum

Government
  - Mayor: İbrahim Şahin (AKP)
- Area: 654 km^{2} (253 sq mi)
- Population (2022): 38,033 (2,022).
  - Density: 58.2/km^{2} (151/sq mi)
- Time zone: UTC+3 (TRT)
- Postal code: 25930
- Area code: 0442
- Climate: Dfb
- Website: www.pazaryolu.bel.tr

Pazaryolu is a municipality and district of Erzurum Province, Turkey. The mayor is İbrahim Şahin (AKP).

== Composition ==
There are 44 neighbourhoods in Pazaryolu District:

- 21 Haziran
- Akbulut
- Alıçlı
- Ambaralan
- Ayçukuru
- Bayındır
- Burçaklı
- Büyükdere
- Çatakbahçe
- Çaydere
- Cenetpınarı
- Cevizlidere
- Çiftepınar
- Deliktaş
- Demirgöze
- Dikmetaş
- Esenyurt
- Gölyanı
- Göztepe
- Gülçimen
- Güneysu
- Hacılar
- Karakoç
- Karataş
- Kılıççı
- Konakyeri
- Korkutköy
- Köşeyolu
- Kozlu
- Kumaşkaya
- Kümbettepe
- Kuymaklı
- Laleli
- Merkez
- Meşebaşı
- Pamukludağ
- Sadaka
- Şehitlik
- Sergenkaya
- Süleymanbağı
- Yaylalı
- Yaylaözü
- Yeni
- Yiğitbaşı
