= Şehitlik, Pazaryolu =

Village in Turkey

Şehitlik
- Neighbourhood
- Country: Turkey
- Province: Erzurum
- District: Pazaryolu
- Population (2022): 74
- Time zone: UTC+3 (TRT)

Şehitlik is a neighbourhood in the municipality and district of Pazaryolu, Erzurum Province in Turkey. Its population is 74 (2022).
