= Karataş, Pazaryolu =

Village in Turkey

Karataş
- Neighbourhood
- Country: Turkey
- Province: Erzurum
- District: Pazaryolu
- Population (2022): 162
- Time zone: UTC+3 (TRT)

Karataş is a neighbourhood in the municipality and district of Pazaryolu, Erzurum Province in Turkey. Its population is 162 (2022).
