= Çatakbahçe, Pazaryolu =

Village in Turkey

Çatakbahçe
- Neighbourhood
- Location in Turkey
- Coordinates: 40°25′03″N 40°43′12″E
- Country: Turkey
- Province: Erzurum
- District: Pazaryolu
- Population (2022): 37
- Time zone: UTC+3 (TRT)

Çatakbahçe is a neighbourhood in the municipality and district of Pazaryolu, Erzurum Province in Turkey. Its population is 37 (2022).
