= Cenetpınarı, Pazaryolu =

Village in Turkey

Cenetpınarı
- Neighbourhood
- Location in Turkey
- Coordinates: 40.4744°N 40.6439°E
- Country: Turkey
- Province: Erzurum
- District: Pazaryolu
- Population (2022): 52
- Time zone: UTC+3 (TRT)

Cenetpınarı is a neighbourhood in the municipality and district of Pazaryolu, Erzurum Province in Turkey. Its population is 52 (2022).
