= Ambaralan, Pazaryolu =

Village in Turkey

Ambaralan
- Neighbourhood
- Location in Turkey
- Coordinates: 40.5484°N 40.7440°E
- Country: Turkey
- Province: Erzurum
- District: Pazaryolu
- Population (2022): 55
- Time zone: UTC+3 (TRT)

Ambaralan is a neighbourhood in the municipality and district of Pazaryolu, Erzurum Province in Turkey. Its population is 55 (2022).
