= Bayındır, Pazaryolu =

Village in Turkey

Bayındır
- Neighbourhood
- Location in Turkey
- Coordinates: 40.3176°N 40.6010°E
- Country: Turkey
- Province: Erzurum
- District: Pazaryolu
- Population (2022): 19
- Time zone: UTC+3 (TRT)

Bayındır is a neighbourhood in the municipality and district of Pazaryolu, Erzurum Province in Turkey. Its population is 19 (2022).
