= Gülçimen, Pazaryolu =

Village in Turkey

Gülçimen
- Neighbourhood
- Country: Turkey
- Province: Erzurum
- District: Pazaryolu
- Population (2022): 162
- Time zone: UTC+3 (TRT)

Gülçimen is a neighbourhood in the municipality and district of Pazaryolu, Erzurum Province in Turkey. Its population is 162 (2022).

Historically, the area was known by names such as Varzenis, Varzens, or Varicenis. In the 1835 census, it was recorded as Varzenis, with a population comprising 71 Muslim and 16 Christian males. By 1896, under the name Varzens, the population consisted solely of Muslims, totaling 163 males. Originally part of İspir district, Gülçimen was incorporated into the newly established Pazaryolu district in 1989.
