= Korkutköy, Pazaryolu =

Village in Turkey

Korkutköy
- Neighbourhood
- Location in Turkey
- Coordinates: 40°27′59″N 40°35′35″E
- Country: Turkey
- Province: Erzurum
- District: Pazaryolu
- Population (2022): 27
- Time zone: UTC+3 (TRT)

Korkutköy is a neighbourhood in the municipality and district of Pazaryolu, Erzurum Province in Turkey. Its population is 27 (2022).
