= Pamukludağ, Pazaryolu =

Village in Turkey

Pamukludağ
- Neighbourhood
- Location in Turkey
- Coordinates: 40°20′N 40°42′E
- Country: Turkey
- Province: Erzurum
- District: Pazaryolu
- Population (2022): 31
- Time zone: UTC+3 (TRT)

Pamukludağ is a neighbourhood in the municipality and district of Pazaryolu, Erzurum Province in Turkey. Its population is 31 (2022).
