= Yaylaözü, Pazaryolu =

Village in Turkey

Yaylaözü
- Neighbourhood
- Location in Turkey
- Coordinates: 40°20′N 40°32′E
- Country: Turkey
- Province: Erzurum
- District: Pazaryolu
- Population (2022): 36
- Time zone: UTC+3 (TRT)

Yaylaözü is a neighbourhood in the municipality and district of Pazaryolu, Erzurum Province in Turkey. Its population is 36 (2022).
