= Dikmetaş, Pazaryolu =

Village in Turkey

Dikmetaş
- Neighbourhood
- Location in Turkey
- Coordinates: 40.390°N 40.663°E
- Country: Turkey
- Province: Erzurum
- District: Pazaryolu
- Population (2022): 26
- Time zone: UTC+3 (TRT)

Dikmetaş is a neighbourhood in the municipality and district of Pazaryolu, Erzurum Province in Turkey. Its population is 26 (2022).
