= Koray Arslan =

Turkish footballer

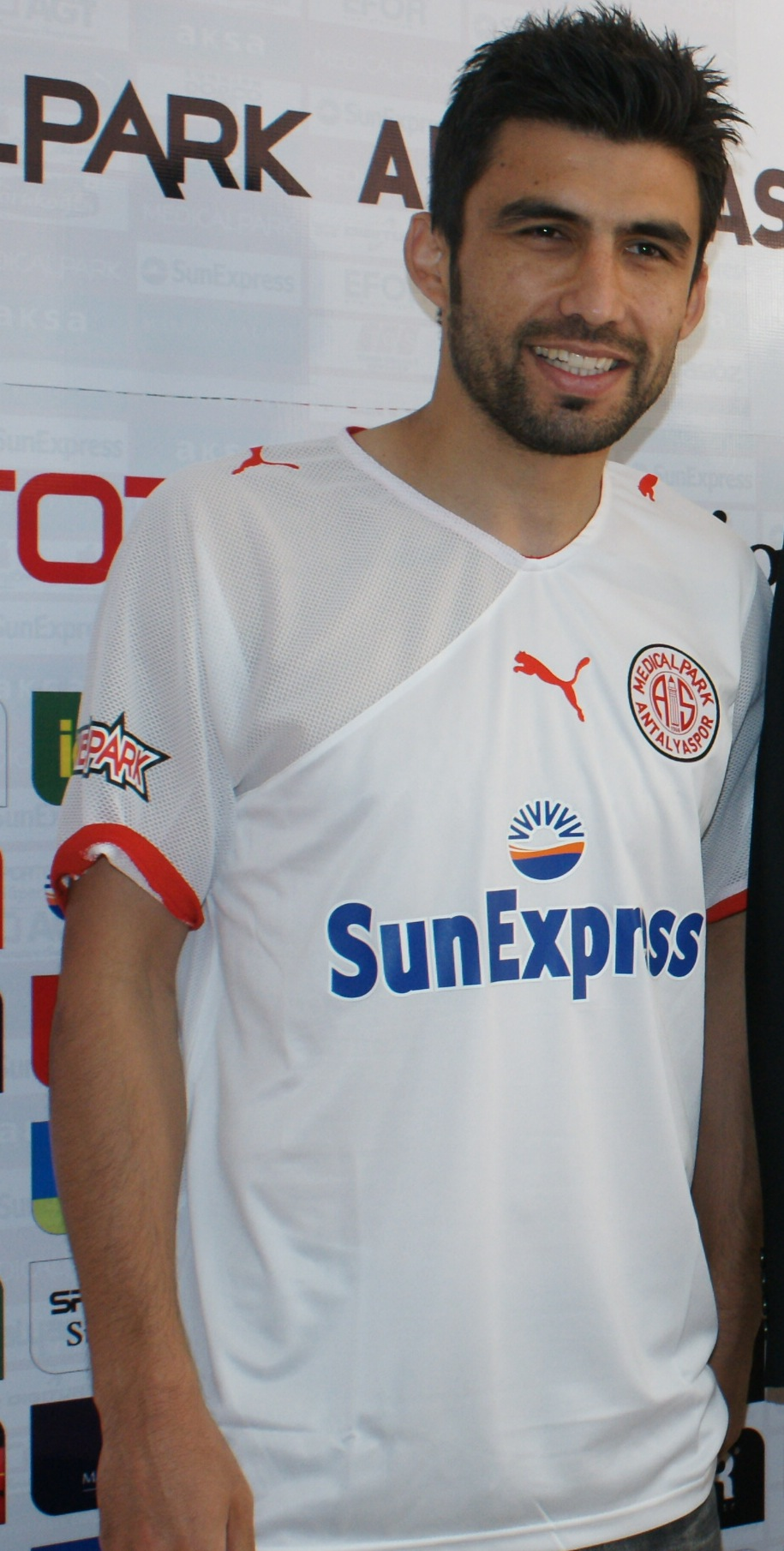

Personal information
- Date of birth: 1 October 1983 (age 43)
- Place of birth: Niğde, Turkey
- Height: 1.78 m (5 ft 10 in)
- Position: Right back

Youth career
- 1999–2001: Bucaspor

Senior career*
Years	Team	Apps	(Gls)
2001–2003	Bucaspor	43	(1)
2003–2004	Göztepe	31	(1)
2005	Karşıyaka	6	(0)
2005–2007	İstanbul Güngörenspor	50	(2)
2007–2012	Eskişehirspor	136	(6)
2012–2014	Antalyaspor	30	(1)
2014–2015	Gaziantepspor	9	(0)
2015	Akhisar Belediyespor	2	(0)
2015	Antalyaspor	0	(0)
2016	Gaziantepspor	11	(0)
- * Club domestic league appearances and goals

Koray Aslan (born 10 October 1983) is a Turkish former football player.
