= Yiğitbaşı, Pazaryolu =

Village in Turkey

Yiğitbaşı
- Neighbourhood
- Location in Turkey
- Coordinates: 40°30′20″N 40°46′14″E
- Country: Turkey
- Province: Erzurum
- District: Pazaryolu
- Population (2022): 21
- Time zone: UTC+3 (TRT)

Yiğitbaşı is a neighbourhood in the municipality and district of Pazaryolu, Erzurum Province, Turkey. Its population is 21 (2022).
