= Büyükdere, Pazaryolu =

Village in Turkey

Büyükdere
- Neighbourhood
- Location in Turkey
- Coordinates: 40.5460°N 40.7314°E
- Country: Turkey
- Province: Erzurum
- District: Pazaryolu
- Population (2022): 43
- Time zone: UTC+3 (TRT)

Büyükdere is a neighbourhood in the municipality and district of Pazaryolu, Erzurum Province in Turkey. Its population is 43 (2022).
