= Emrecan Afacanoğlu =

Turkish footballer (born 1991)

Personal information
- Full name: Emrecan Afacanoğlu
- Date of birth: 15 March 1991 (age 35)
- Place of birth: Konak, İzmir, Turkey
- Height: 1.89 m (6 ft 2 in)
- Position: Centre back

Team information
- Current team: Bergama Belediyespor

Youth career
- –2006: Turgutreis Belediyespor
- 2006–2007: Bergama Gençlerbirliği
- 2007–2010: Bucaspor

Senior career*
| Years | Team | Apps | (Gls) |
| 2010–2015 | Bucaspor | 30 | (1) |
| 2012–2013 | → Bergama Belediyespor (loan) | 3 | (0) |
| 2013–2014 | → Bergama Belediyespor (loan) | 28 | (0) |
| 2015–2018 | Boluspor | 8 | (0) |
| 2016–2017 | → Manisa BB (loan) | 26 | (1) |
| 2017 | → Bergama Belediyespor (loan) | 13 | (0) |
| 2017–2018 | → Pazarspor (loan) | 29 | (2) |
| 2018–2019 | Pazarspor | 12 | (0) |
| 2019 | Kızılcabölükspor | 11 | (0) |
| 2019– | Bergama Belediyespor | 9 | (0) |

International career
| 2008–2009 | Turkey U17 | 2 | (0) |
| 2009 | Turkey U18 | 4 | (0) |
- * Club domestic league appearances and goals as of 18:08, 28 February 2020 (UTC)

Emrecan Afacanoğlu (born 15 March 1991) is a Turkish professional footballer. He plays as a centre back for Bergama Belediyespor.

== Life and career ==
Afacanoğlu began his career with Bucaspor in 2007. He made his professional debut against Fethiyespor in a TFF Second League match on 9 November 2008.
