= İzzet Kaya =

Turkish footballer

Personal information
- Full name: İzzet Kaya
- Date of birth: 28 January 1977 (age 49)
- Place of birth: Muş, Turkey
- Height: 1.72 m (5 ft 8 in)
- Position: Right full back

Team information
- Current team: Şanlıurfaspor
- Number: 80

Senior career*
Years	Team	Apps	(Gls)
1994–1996	İnegölspor	34	(3)
1996	Bursaspor	5	(1)
1997–2003	Karabükspor	127	(12)
2003–2004	MKE Kırıkkalespor	31	(5)
2004	Manisaspor	0	(0)
2005	Yalovaspor	15	(0)
2005–2006	Boluspor	31	(1)
2006–2010	Bucaspor	80	(2)
2010–	Göztepe	4	(0)
- * Club domestic league appearances and goals as of 24 September 2010

İzzet Kaya (born 28 January 1977) is a Turkish professional footballer. He currently plays as a right fullback for Şanlıurfaspor in the TFF First League.

== Life and career ==
Kaya was born in Muş, Turkey. He made his professional debut on 16 April 1995 in a match against TKİ Tavşanlı Linyitspor.
