= Konakyeri, Pazaryolu =

Village in Turkey

Konakyeri
- Neighbourhood
- Country: Turkey
- Province: Erzurum
- District: Pazaryolu
- Population (2022): 475
- Time zone: UTC+3 (TRT)

Konakyeri is a neighbourhood in the municipality and district of Pazaryolu, Erzurum Province in Turkey. Its population is 475 (2022).
