= Köşeyolu, Pazaryolu =

Village in Turkey

Köşeyolu
- Neighbourhood
- Location in Turkey
- Coordinates: 40°20′N 40°37′E
- Country: Turkey
- Province: Erzurum
- District: Pazaryolu
- Population (2022): 59
- Time zone: UTC+3 (TRT)

Köşeyolu is a neighbourhood in the municipality and district of Pazaryolu, Erzurum Province in Turkey. Its population is 59 (2022).
