= Sergenkaya, Pazaryolu =

Village in Turkey

Sergenkaya
- Neighbourhood
- Location in Turkey
- Coordinates: 40°26′44″N 40°36′57″E
- Country: Turkey
- Province: Erzurum
- District: Pazaryolu
- Population (2022): 57
- Time zone: UTC+3 (TRT)

Sergenkaya is a neighbourhood in the municipality and district of Pazaryolu, Erzurum Province in Turkey. Its population is 57 (2022).
