= Ayçukuru, Pazaryolu =

Village in Turkey

Ayçukuru
- Neighbourhood
- Location in Turkey
- Coordinates: 40°19′N 40°39′E
- Country: Turkey
- Province: Erzurum
- District: Pazaryolu
- Population (2022): 13
- Time zone: UTC+3 (TRT)

Ayçukuru is a neighbourhood in the municipality and district of Pazaryolu, Erzurum Province in Turkey. Its population is 13 (2022).
