= Bekir Yılmaz =

Turkish footballer

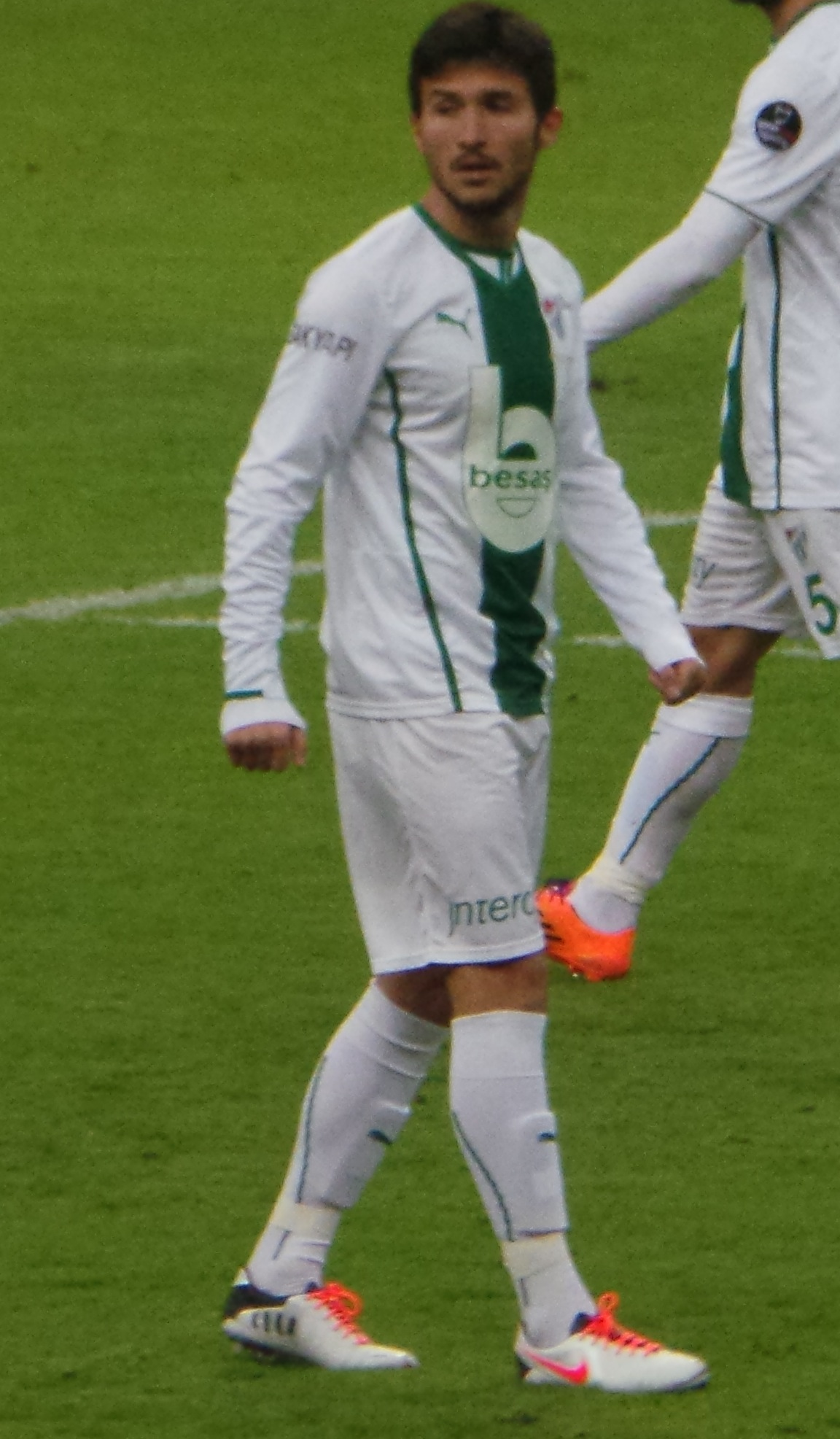

Personal information
- Date of birth: 6 March 1988 (age 38)
- Place of birth: İzmir, Turkey
- Height: 1.80 m (5 ft 11 in)
- Position: Midfielder

Team information
- Current team: Manisaspor

Youth career
- 2000–2006: Buca Belediye

Senior career*
Years	Team	Apps	(Gls)
2006–2010	Bucaspor	106	(8)
2010–2014	Manisaspor	85	(5)
2014–2016	Bursaspor	63	(4)
2016–2018	Adanaspor	43	(1)
2018–2019	Gençlerbirliği	27	(4)
2019–2020	Giresunspor	24	(1)
2020–2021	Boluspor	12	(2)
2021–2024	Eyüpspor	65	(2)
2024–2025	Manisaspor		
2025	Manisa	0	(0)
2025–	Manisaspor		
- * Club domestic league appearances and goals as of 28 November 2025

Bekir Yılmaz (born 6 March 1988) is a Turkish professional footballer who plays as a midfielder for an amateur club Manisaspor.

== Club career ==
Yılmaz began his career with local club Buca Belediye in 2000. He was transferred to Bucaspor in 2006, before transferring to Manisaspor in 2010.
