= Demirgöze, Pazaryolu =

Village in Turkey

Demirgöze
- Neighbourhood
- Location in Turkey
- Coordinates: 40°21′21″N 40°50′30″E
- Country: Turkey
- Province: Erzurum
- District: Pazaryolu
- Population (2022): 15
- Time zone: UTC+3 (TRT)

Demirgöze is a neighbourhood in the municipality and district of Pazaryolu, Erzurum Province in Turkey. Its population is 15 (2022).
