= Kumaşkaya, Pazaryolu =

Village in Turkey

Kumaşkaya
- Neighbourhood
- Location in Turkey
- Coordinates: 40°31′53″N 40°45′07″E
- Country: Turkey
- Province: Erzurum
- District: Pazaryolu
- Population (2022): 52
- Time zone: UTC+3 (TRT)

Kumaşkaya is a neighbourhood in the municipality and district of Pazaryolu, Erzurum Province in Turkey. Its population is 52 (2022).
