= Sadaka, Pazaryolu =

Village in Turkey

Sadaka
- Neighbourhood
- Location in Turkey
- Coordinates: 40°27′23″N 40°41′09″E
- Country: Turkey
- Province: Erzurum
- District: Pazaryolu
- Population (2022): 145
- Time zone: UTC+3 (TRT)

Sadaka is a neighbourhood in the municipality and district of Pazaryolu, Erzurum Province in Turkey. Its population is 145 (2022).
