= Onur Karakabak =

Turkish footballer

Personal information
- Date of birth: 8 April 1992 (age 34)
- Place of birth: Zonguldak, Turkey
- Height: 1.74 m (5 ft 9 in)
- Position: Left back

Team information
- Current team: Şanlıurfaspor
- Number: 67

Youth career
- 2005–2008: Sakaryaspor

Senior career*
Years	Team	Apps	(Gls)
2008–2009	Sakaryaspor	0	(0)
2009–2014	Fenerbahçe A2		
2010	→ Mersin İdmanyurdu (loan)	10	(0)
2011–2012	→ Manisaspor (loan)	2	(0)
2012–2013	→ Gaziosmanpaşaspor (loan)	11	
2014	→ Derincespor (loan)	14	(0)
2014–2015	Bandırmaspor	3	(0)
2015–2016	Kahramanmaraşspor	38	(1)
2016–2017	Bayburt Özel İdarespor	29	(0)
2017	Pendikspor	11	(0)
2018–2019	Nazilli Belediyespor	47	(0)
2019–2021	Kırşehir FK	60	(2)
2021–2022	Sakaryaspor	35	(0)
2022–2023	Karacabey Belediyespor	32	(0)
2023–2024	Amed	33	(0)
2024–2025	Kepezspor	19	(0)
2025	→ Serikspor	11	(1)
2025–	Şanlıurfaspor	14	(0)

International career
2007	Turkey U15	3	(0)
2007–2008	Turkey U16	19	(5)
2008–2009	Turkey U17	6	(0)
2010–2011	Turkey U19	3	(0)
- * Club domestic league appearances and goals as of 30 November 2025

Onur Karakabak (born 8 April 1992) is a Turkish footballer who plays for TFF 2. Lig club Şanlıurfaspor.

== Career ==
He has played at Sakaryaspor all his life but only featuring in youth leagues. In the season 2007-2008 he had 19 appearances in the Deplasmanlı Süper Gençler Lig where he bagged 5 goals. He has also featured in the DSGL Turkey Champions with 3 appearances.

He signed a three-year contract for Fenerbahçe on 15 January 2009, but was allowed to see out the rest of the season at Sakaryaspor. During the second half of the 2009-2010 season he was loaned to TFF First League team Mersin İdmanyurdu. In June 2010 he was included in the summer camp squad by Fenerbahçe's manager Aykut Kocaman. After a strong season at Mersin İdmanyurdu he was sent to Manisaspor on loan.

On 3 August 2012, he joined Samsunspor on loan for the 2012-13 season.

== International ==
Onur made his international début for Turkey U-15 where he played 3 international friendlies. He was then called up to Turkey U-16 and featured in the Nike Tournament, Easter Tournament and the Viktor Bannikov Tournament. He then moved on to Turkey U-17 where he has appeared in 2 international friendlies, and four "FIFA U17 World Cup" games. In 2010, he was capped in Turkey U-19 national team in "UEFA European Championship Finals 2009-2010" and played three games.
