= Nike JOGA3 =

Joga3
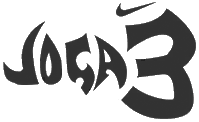
- Organiser(s): Nike, Inc.
- Founded: 2006
- Abolished: ?
- Region: Worldwide

JOGA3, in full: Nike JOGA3, was a futsal tournament created in 2006 by American multinational corporation Nike for two main reasons. Firstly, it was for the run-up to the 2006 FIFA World Cup finals in Germany, and also, it was to help promote the "Joga Bonito" campaign (then less than two months old when JOGA3 started) and its five principles (heart, honour, joy, skill, team). JOGA3 was hosted in 39 different nations, with each nation having multiple cities/towns that hosted it, in which there were multiple locations in the cities/towns that hosted it. There was a National Finals for every country, and the winners earned a place at the World finals (in Brazil).

== Overview ==
There were four categories: Under-20 male, Under-20 female, U-16 male, U-16 female. For the whole Under-20 category (aged 20–17, but with exceptions as young as 13), players qualifying to play in it must not have turned 21 by 31 August, 2006. For the whole of the Under-16 category (aged 16–13), players qualifying to play in it must not have turned 17 by 31 August, 2006. The minimum age for this category (and the whole JOGA3 tournament) was to be at least 13 years old.

Each JOGA3 game lasted for three minutes (excluding knock-out games that finish as a draw after the three minutes of normal time). It is winner-stays-on, and the losers have to officially get themselves in the JOGA3 order again (if they want to compete some more). If it is a draw, both teams leave the field.

For every win (including all knock-out games, but excluding all National and World Finals), 1,000 points (in the UK and ROI, other countries vary) were awarded. No points were awarded for a draw and a loss. Knock-out games in regional tournaments commenced at the end of the night, and the teams that went through were decided on a league system of the teams with the most point gained on the night advancing to the knock-out phase. All points gained at any time always went on the overall record as well.
