= Caner Ağca =

Turkish footballer

Personal information
- Date of birth: 28 October 1984 (age 41)
- Place of birth: İzmir, Turkey
- Height: 1.68 m (5 ft 6 in)
- Position: Midfielder

Team information
- Current team: Karşıyaka S.K.
- Number: 20

Senior career*
Years	Team	Apps	(Gls)
2008–2009	Ankaraspor A.Ş.	7	
2012–	Karşıyaka S.K.	48	(8)
- * Club domestic league appearances and goals

Caner Ağca (born 28 October 1984) is a Turkish professional football player who currently plays for Karşıyaka S.K.
