= Abdullah Halman =

Turkish footballer

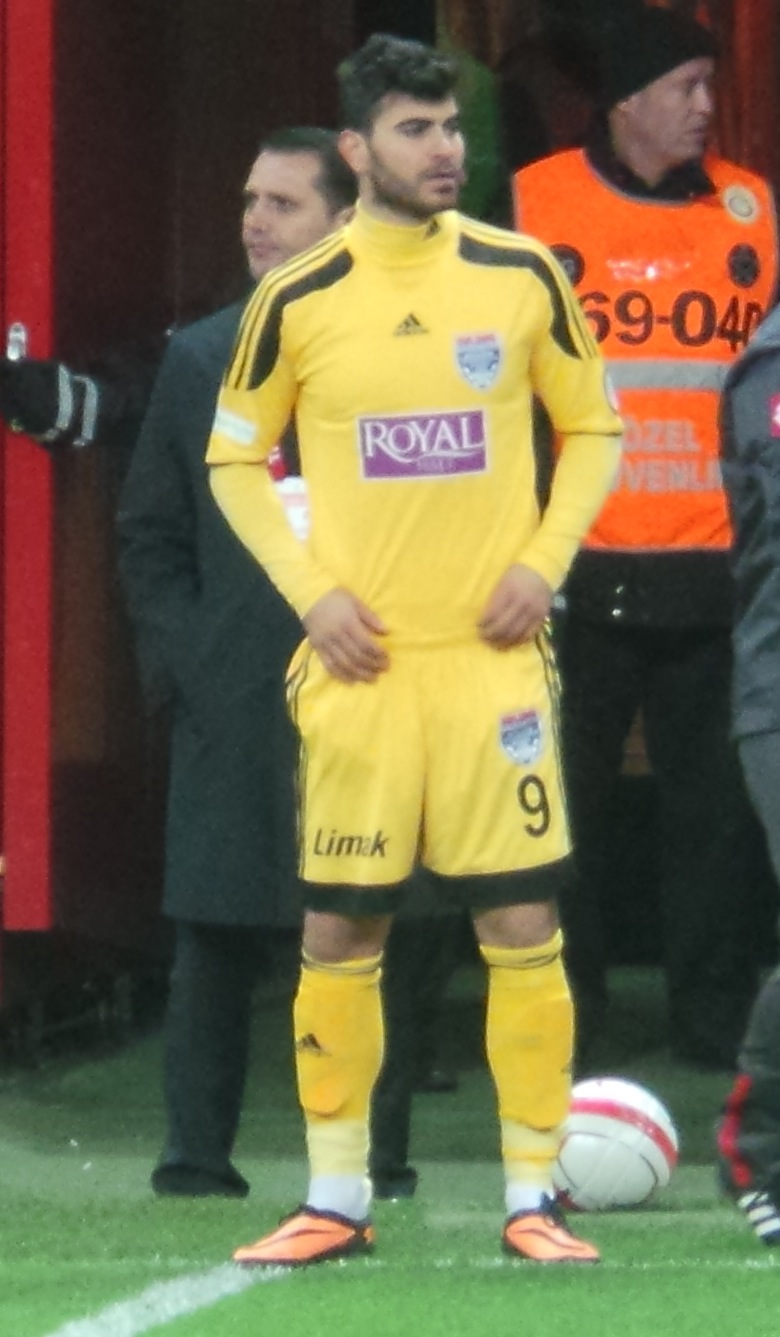

Personal information
- Date of birth: 15 August 1987 (age 39)
- Place of birth: Şanlıurfa, Turkey
- Height: 1.82 m (6 ft 0 in)
- Position: Striker

Youth career
- 1999–2005: Gaziantepspor

Senior career*
Years	Team	Apps	(Gls)
2005–2007	Gaziantepspor	0	(0)
2006	→ Gaskispor (loan)	0	(0)
2006–2007	→ Mezitlispor (loan)	14	(2)
2007–2008	Mersin Idman Yurdu	27	(10)
2008–2010	Eskişehirspor	36	(10)
2009	→ Mersin Idman Yurdu (loan)	4	(0)
2009–2010	→ Şanlıurfaspor (loan)	2	(3)
2010–2012	Gaziantep BB	56	(13)
2012–2013	Mersin Idman Yurdu	0	(0)
2013	1461 Trabzon	13	(2)
2013–2015	Gaziantep BB	39	(7)
2015–2016	Kocaeli Birlik Spor	30	(18)
2016–2017	Ümraniyespor	14	(0)
2017–2018	Kastamonuspor 1966	15	(3)
2018–2019	Tarsus İdman Yurdu	24	(4)
2019	Tuzlaspor	4	(0)
2020–2021	Sivas Belediyespor	22	(1)
2022	Gaziantep Ankasspor	2	(1)
- * Club domestic league appearances and goals as of 21:04, 23 July 2022 (UTC)

Abdullah Halman (born 15 August 1987) is a Turkish former footballer who last played as a striker for Gaziantep Ankasspor.
