= Onur Demirtaş =

Turkish footballer

Personal information
- Full name: Onur Demirtaş
- Date of birth: 30 January 1982 (age 44)
- Place of birth: Ankara, Turkey
- Position: Defensive midfielder

Senior career*
| Years | Team | Apps | (Gls) |
| 2001–2002 | Türk Telekom | 32 | (5) |
| 2002–2004 | Adana Demirspor | 44 | (2) |
| 2004–2007 | Türk Telekom | 86 | (1) |
| 2007–2012 | Adanaspor | 71 | (0) |
| 2012 | Eyüpspor | 9 | (0) |
| 2012–2013 | Hatayspor | 9 | (0) |
| 2013–2014 | Etimesgut Belediyespor | 16 | (1) |
| 2014–2015 | Muğlaspor | 23 | (0) |
| 2015–2016 | Ankara TKİ Spor | | |
- * Club domestic league appearances and goals as of 11 August 2015

Onur Demirtaş (born 30 January 1982) is a Turkish former professional footballer.
