= Sercan Kaya =

Turkish footballer

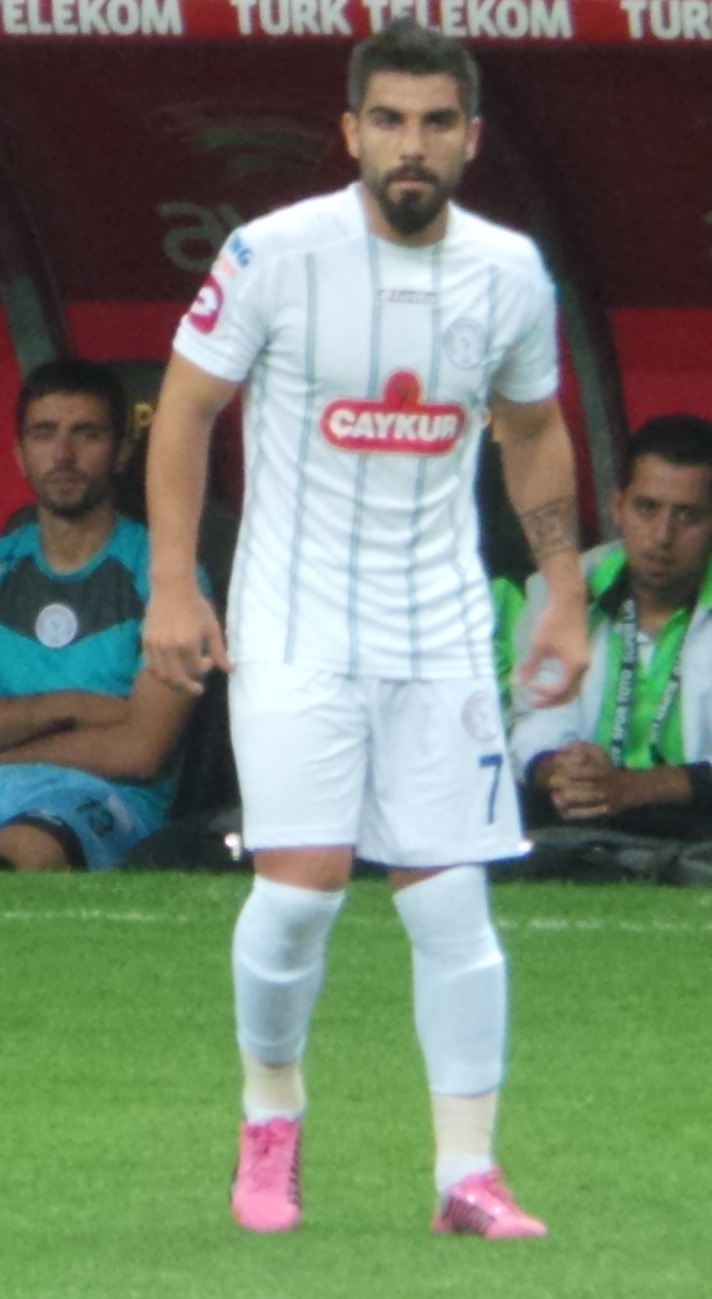

Personal information
- Date of birth: 15 March 1988 (age 38)
- Place of birth: İzmir, Turkey
- Height: 1.74 m (5 ft 9 in)
- Positions: Right winger; attacking midfielder

Team information
- Current team: Darıca Gençlerbirliği
- Number: 8

Youth career
- 1999–2007: Bucaspor

Senior career*
Years	Team	Apps	(Gls)
2007–2011	Bucaspor	52	(7)
2011–2013	Trabzonspor	2	(0)
2012–2013	→ 1461 Trabzon (loan)	18	(9)
2013–2016	Çaykur Rizespor	76	(11)
2016–2017	Adana Demirspor	30	(2)
2017	Ankaragücü	2	(0)
2017–2018	Adanaspor	9	(0)
2018–2020	Şanlıurfaspor	58	(8)
2020	Kemerspor 2003	4	(1)
2020	Ergene Velimeşe	0	(0)
2020–2021	Gümüşhanespor	31	(10)
2021–2022	Vanspor FK	2	(0)
2022–	Darıca Gençlerbirliği	23	(7)

International career
2008	Turkey U20	2	(0)
- * Club domestic league appearances and goals as of 12 November 2022

Sercan Kaya (born 15 March 1988) is a Turkish professional footballer who plays as a midfielder for Darıca Gençlerbirliği.
