= Kuymaklı, Pazaryolu =

Village in Turkey

Kuymaklı
- Neighbourhood
- Location in Turkey
- Coordinates: 40°28′N 40°47′E
- Country: Turkey
- Province: Erzurum
- District: Pazaryolu
- Population (2022): 33
- Time zone: UTC+3 (TRT)

Kuymaklı is a neighbourhood in the municipality and district of Pazaryolu, Erzurum Province in Turkey. Its population is 33 (2022).
