= Murat Karakoç =

Turkish footballer and manager

Personal information
- Full name: Murat Karakoç
- Date of birth: 7 September 1979 (age 47)
- Place of birth: İzmir, Turkey
- Height: 1.80 m (5 ft 11 in)
- Position: Left winger

Senior career*
Years	Team	Apps	(Gls)
1998–2000	Bucaspor	31	(0)
2000	Aydınspor	14	(1)
2000–2003	Altay	77	(4)
2003–2004	Manisaspor	23	(3)
2004–2005	Altay	23	(4)
2005–2006	Karşıyaka	28	(3)
2006–2010	Denizlispor	37	(1)
2010	Bucaspor	9	(0)
2010–2011	Altay	28	(0)
2011–2013	Turgutluspor	12	(0)

Managerial career
- 2014–2015: Altınordu U21
- 2015: Altınordu U16
- 2015–2016: Altınordu U21
- 2016: Altınordu U19
- * Club domestic league appearances and goals

Murat Karakoç (born 7 September 1979) is a Turkish retired professional footballer and later football manager.
