= Serhat Yapıcı =

German-Turkish footballer

Personal information
- Full name: Serhat Yapıcı
- Date of birth: 22 July 1988 (age 38)
- Place of birth: Hamburg
- Height: 1.74 m (5 ft 9 in)
- Position: Midfielder

Team information
- Current team: Kalev Tallinn
- Number: 13

Senior career*
Years	Team	Apps	(Gls)
2008–10	Hacettepe	39	(1)
2011	Polatlı Bugsaşspor	14	(0)
2011–12	İskenderun Demir Çelikspor	17	(1)
2013–	Kalev Tallinn	7	(0)

International career^{‡}
	Turkey U-21	4	(0)
- * Club domestic league appearances and goals as of 2 June 2013 ‡ National team caps and goals as of 2 June 2013

Serhat Yapıcı (born 22 July 1988) is a Turkish-German footballer who plays for Tallinna Kalev in the Estonian Meistriliiga.

== Career ==
He used to play for Hacettepe in the Turkish Süper Lig before the club got relegated in 2009.

Yapıcı is a former member of the Turkey national under-21 football team.
