= Adem Alkaşi =

Turkish footballer

Personal information
- Date of birth: 14 April 1984 (age 42)
- Place of birth: Istanbul, Turkey
- Height: 1.82 m (6 ft 0 in)
- Position: Right back

Youth career
- 1999–2004: İstanbul B.B.

Senior career*
Years	Team	Apps	(Gls)
2004–2006	Yeni Burdur Gençlikspor	48	(2)
2006–2007	Çankırı Belediyespor	29	(1)
2007–2008	Zeytinburnuspor	17	(1)
2008–2009	Çanakkale Dardanelspor	45	(2)
2009–2012	Samsunspor	89	(2)
2012–2013	Elazığspor	36	(0)
2013–2014	Boluspor	16	(0)
2014–2015	Antalyaspor	31	(0)
2015–2016	Boluspor	27	(0)
2016–2017	Niğde Belediyespor	13	(0)
2017–2019	Elazığspor	42	(0)
2019–2020	Bandırmaspor	28	(0)
- * Club domestic league appearances and goals as of 15 March 2020

Adem Alkaşi (born 14 April 1984 in Istanbul) is a Turkish footballer who plays as a right back.
