= Kaya Tarakcı =

Turkish footballer

Kaya Tarakçı
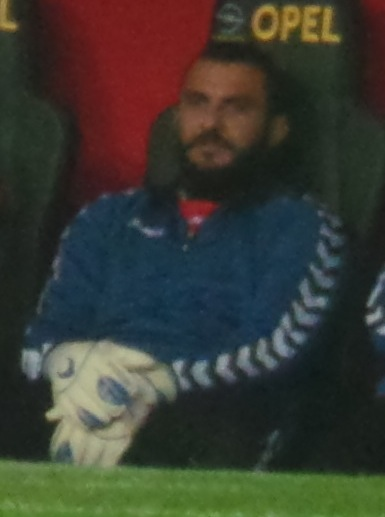

Personal information
- Full name: Kaya Tarakçı
- Date of birth: 23 April 1981 (age 45)
- Place of birth: Adana, Turkey
- Height: 1.88 m (6 ft 2 in)
- Position: Goalkeeper

Senior career*
Years	Team	Apps	(Gls)
1998	Gaskispor	0	(0)
1998–1999	Gaziantepspor	19	(0)
1999–2002	Gaziantep BB	20	(0)
2002–2006	Gaziantepspor	20	(0)
2006–2007	Kocaelispor	8	(0)
2007–2008	Kayseri Erciyesspor	21	(0)
2008–2009	Adana Demirspor	18	(0)
2009–2010	Mersin İdmanyurdu	1	(0)
2010–2012	Kartalspor	63	(0)
2012–2017	Konyaspor	65	(0)
2017–2018	BB Erzurumspor	11	(0)
2018	Çaykur Rizespor	1	(0)
2018–2019	Bodrum BB	18	(0)

International career
2002	Turkey U21	1	(0)
- * Club domestic league appearances and goals

Kaya Tarakçı (born 23 April 1981 in Adana) is a retired Turkish footballer who played goalkeeper. He has been called to the Turkey national under-21 football team twice and played the second half once against Georgia national under-21 football team on 20 August 2002 where the Turkey national under-21 football team lost 0–1.

== Honours ==
Konyaspor

- Turkish Cup: 2016–17
