= Emre Gürbüz =

Turkish footballer (born 1991)

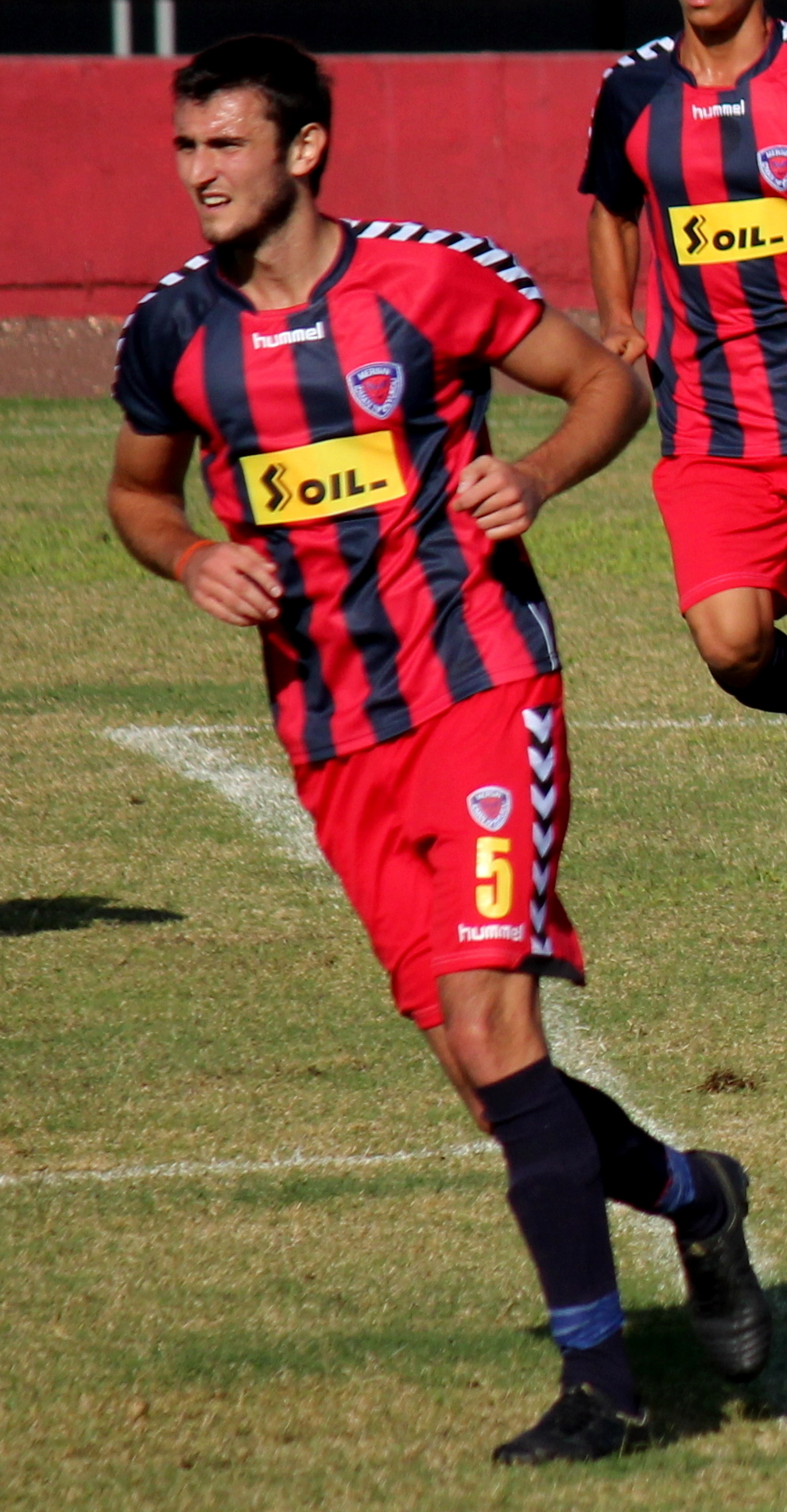

Personal information
- Full name: Emre Gürbüz
- Date of birth: March 25, 1991 (age 35)
- Place of birth: Mersin, Turkey
- Height: 1.92 m (6 ft 4 in)
- Position: Defender

Team information
- Current team: Elazığ Belediyespor FK

Youth career
- 2001–2006: Mersin Kuvayi Milliye
- 2006–2008: Şekerspor

Senior career*
Years	Team	Apps	(Gls)
2008–2009	Şekerspor	0	(0)
2009–2010	→ Mersin İdman Yurdu (loan)	0	(0)
2010–2012	Mersin İdman Yurdu	1	(0)
2012–	Pazarspor		
- * Club domestic league appearances and goals as of 1 August 2012

Emre Gürbüz (born 25 March 1991) is a Turkish footballer who plays for Elazığ Belediyespor FK. He is a versatile central defender who can also play defensive midfielder.

Gürbüz started his career with local club Mersin Kuvayi Milliye in 1998 where he has played since. Şekerspor transferred him in 2006. He was loaned out to Mersin İdman Yurdu for two seasons from 2009 to 2011. In August 2011, he signed a two-year contract with Turkish Süper Lig side Mersin İdman Yurdu.
