= Ercüment Kafkasyalı =

Turkish footballer

Personal information
- Date of birth: 13 September 1985 (age 41)
- Place of birth: Ankara, Turkey
- Height: 1.90 m (6 ft 3 in)
- Position: Goalkeeper

Youth career
- 1999–2003: Etimesgut Şekerspor
- 2003–2004: Hacettepe

Senior career*
Years	Team	Apps	(Gls)
2003–2004	Hacettepe	?	(?)
2004–2010	Gençlerbirliği	0	(0)
2006–2007	→ İnegölspor (loan)	25	(0)
2007–2008	→ Samsunspor (loan)	26	(0)
2008–2010	→ Hacettepe (loan)	33	(0)
2010–2012	Konyaspor	4	(0)
2012–2013	Bugsaşspor	30	(0)
2013–2015	Osmanlıspor	2	(0)
2015–2017	Karabükspor	0	(0)
2017–2018	Sakaryaspor	37	(0)
2018	Darıca Gençlerbirliği	15	(0)
2019	BAKspor	14	(0)
2019–2020	Kocaelispor	23	(0)
2020–2022	Esenler Erokspor	50	(0)
2022–2023	Çankaya	32	(0)
2023–2025	Esenler Erokspor	38	(0)
2025	Türk Metal 1963 SK	1	(0)
- * Club domestic league appearances and goals as of 7 September 2025

Ercüment Kafkasyalı (born 13 September 1985) is a Turkish footballer who plays as a goalkeeper.
