= Ozan Özkan =

Turkish footballer (born 1984)

Personal information
- Date of birth: 1 June 1984 (age 42)
- Place of birth: Muğla, Turkey
- Height: 1.81 m (5 ft 11 1/2 in)
- Position: Defender

Senior career*
Years	Team	Apps	(Gls)
2002–2003	Yalikavak Belediyespor		
2003–2005	Muğlaspor	28	(3)
2005–2008	Konyaspor	9	(0)
2007–2008	→ Karşıyaka (loan)	2	(0)
2008–2009	Karşıyaka	6	(0)
2009	Denizlispor	7	(0)
2009–2011	Mersin İdmanyurdu	10	(0)
2011–2012	Bandırmaspor	15	(0)
2012–2014	Samsunspor	13	(0)
2014–2015	Marmaris GSK		
2015–2017	Muğlaspor		
- * Club domestic league appearances and goals

Ozan Özkan (born 1 June 1984) is a Turkish former footballer.
