= Kıvanç Karakaş =

Turkish footballer

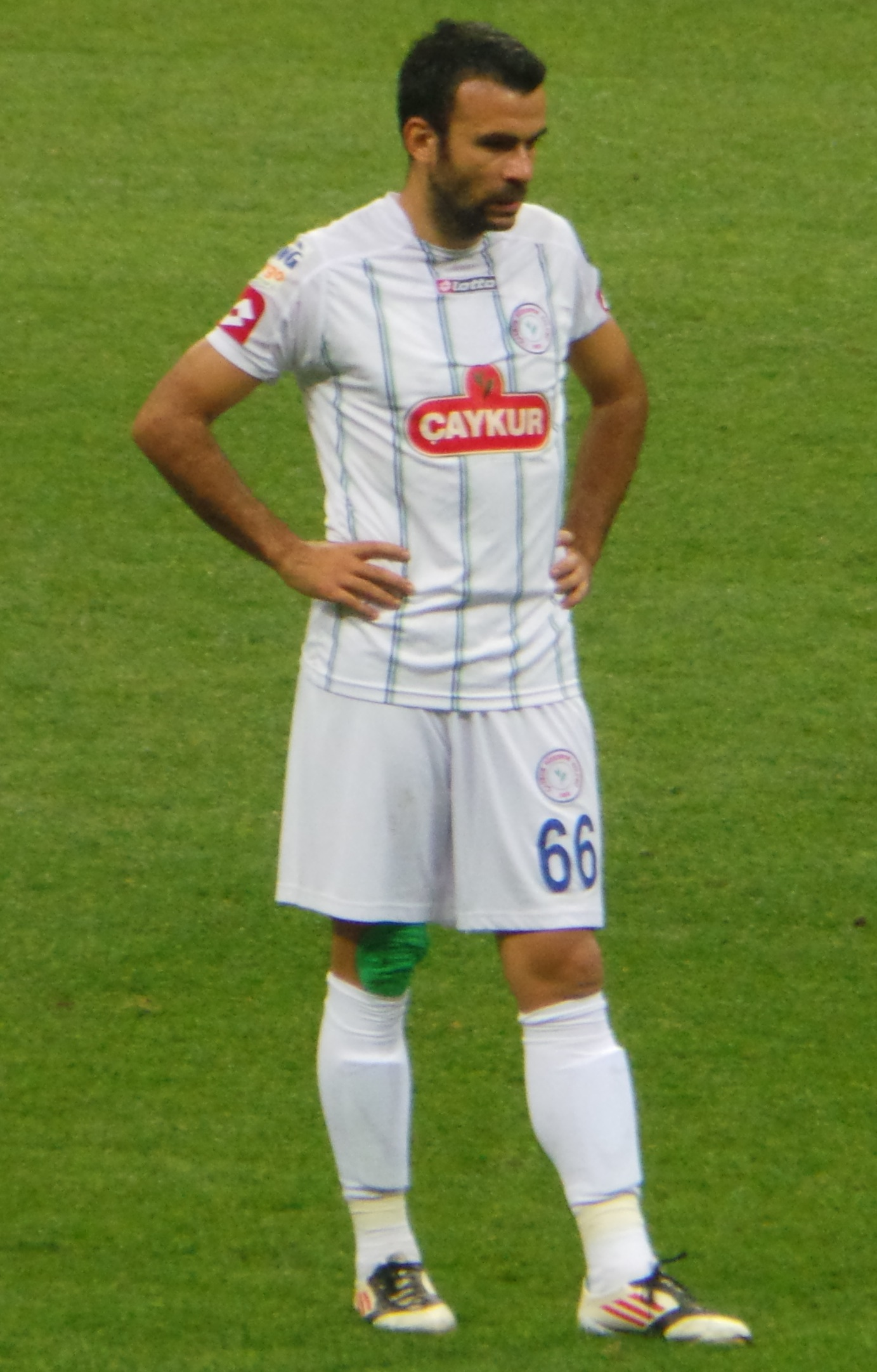
- Karakaş in the shirt of Çaykur Rizespor

Personal information
- Date of birth: 3 March 1985 (age 41)
- Place of birth: Üsküdar, Istanbul, Turkey
- Height: 1.80 m (5 ft 11 in)
- Position: Central midfielder

Youth career
- 1998–2003: Beylerbeyi
- 2003–2004: Beşiktaş
- 2004–2005: Selimiye

Senior career*
Years	Team	Apps	(Gls)
2005–2007	Beykoz 1908	14	(0)
2007–2008	Yalovaspor	28	(0)
2008–2011	Karşıyaka	81	(9)
2011–2012	Sivasspor	23	(3)
2012–2013	Şanlıurfaspor	22	(4)
2013–2015	Çaykur Rizespor	59	(1)
2015–2016	Şanlıurfaspor	10	(0)
2016	Eskişehirspor	13	(0)
2016–2017	Bandırmaspor	11	(0)
2017–2018	Sarıyer	6	(1)
2019–2021	Eskişehirspor	25	(0)
- * Club domestic league appearances and goals as of 7 May 2021

Kıvanç Karakaş (born 3 March 1985) is a Turkish professional footballer.
