= Ersin Güreler =

Turkish footballer

Personal information
- Full name: Ersin Güreler
- Date of birth: September 7, 1978 (age 48)
- Place of birth: Istanbul, Turkey
- Height: 1.79 m (5 ft 10 in)
- Position: Left back

Youth career
- 1995–1996: Zeytinburnuspor

Senior career*
Years	Team	Apps	(Gls)
1996–1998	Zeytinburnuspor	33	(2)
1997–1998	→ Giresunspor (loan)	15	(0)
1998–2000	Giresunspor	63	(3)
2000–2001	Beykozspor	26	(0)
2001–2002	Akçaabat Sebatspor	35	(0)
2002–2003	Göztepe	33	(0)
2003–2004	Konyaspor	34	(0)
2004–2006	Çaykur Rizespor	22	(0)
2005–2006	→ İstanbulspor (loan)	35	(0)
2006–2007	Kocaelispor	17	(0)
2007	Diyarbakırspor	16	(0)
2007–2009	Eskişehirspor	27	(1)
2009–2011	Çaykur Rizespor	43	(1)
2012	Tepecikspor	15	(1)
- * Club domestic league appearances and goals

Ersin Güreler (born September 7, 1978) is a retired Turkish footballer who primarily played as a left back. Known for his attacking style of play, he represented 12 different teams in Turkish football. However, his involvement in the Gülen movement came under scrutiny following the attempted coup d'etat in July 2016. Subsequently, in January 2020, Güreler was convicted and sentenced to 6 years and 3 months in prison for being a member of an armed terror organization due to his connections with the Gülen movement.
