= Muhammed Türkmen =

Turkish footballer

Personal information
- Full name: Muhammed Türkmen
- Date of birth: 9 April 1986 (age 40)
- Place of birth: Ulubey, Ordu, Turkey
- Height: 1.80 m (5 ft 11 in)
- Position: Midfielder

Youth career
- 1999–2001: Altaş Soyaspor
- 2001–2005: Fenerbahçe

Senior career*
Years	Team	Apps	(Gls)
2005–2007	İnegölspor	57	(0)
2007–2008	Kocaelispor	2	(0)
2008	Orduspor	12	(0)
2009	İstanbulspor	13	(1)
2009–2011	Kartalspor	32	(0)
2011–2013	MKE Ankaragücü	17	(0)
- * Club domestic league appearances and goals as of 6 April 2013

Muhammed Türkmen (born 9 April 1986) is a former Turkish professional footballer. He played as a midfielder.

Türkmen began his career with Altaş Soyaspor in 1999. He moved to Fenerbahçe in 2001, and played for the youth teams until 2005. İnegölspor signed him to his first professional contract on 22 August 2005. He spent two years with the club before moving to Kocaelispor. He has played for Orduspor, İstanbulspor, and Kartalspor since then. Türkmen moved to MKE Ankaragücü on 17 January 2011.
