= Kenan Yelek =

Turkish footballer and coach

Personal information
- Date of birth: 15 August 1975 (age 51)
- Place of birth: Giresun, Turkey
- Height: 1.86 m (6 ft 1 in)
- Position: Defender

Senior career*
Years	Team	Apps	(Gls)
1994–1997	Gebzespor	42	(3)
1997–1999	Zeytinburnuspor	40	(3)
1999–2000	Altay	19	(0)
2000–2011	Samsunspor	311	(12)
Total		412	(18)

International career
2004	Turkey	1	(0)

Managerial career
- 2013–2014: Boluspor (U15)
- 2015–2017: Samsunspor (assistant)
- 2017–2018: Çarşambaspor
- 2019–: Çarşambaspor
- * Club domestic league appearances and goals

Kenan Yelek (born 15 August 1975 in Giresun) is a Turkish football coach and former professional footballer who played as a centre back.

== Club career ==
Yelek joined Samsunspor from Altay S.K. in August 2000, and has played for the club ever since.

== International career ==
Yelek appeared in one match for the senior Turkey national football team, entering as a second-half substitute in a friendly against Denmark on 18 February 2004.
