= Yunus İçuz =

Turkish footballer (born 1983)

Personal information
- Date of birth: 27 March 1983 (age 43)
- Place of birth: Balıkesir, Turkey
- Height: 1.78 m (5 ft 10 in)
- Position: Attacking midfielder

Team information
- Current team: Balıkesirspor (assistant coach)

Youth career
- 1999–2001: Balıkesirspor

Senior career*
Years	Team	Apps	(Gls)
2000–2001	Balıkesirspor		
2001–2004	Kartalspor		
2004–2006	Maltepespor		
2006–2007	Balıkesirspor		
2007–2008	Darıca GB		
2008–2011	Balıkesirspor		
2011–2014	Kırklarelispor	74	(7)
2014	Nazilli Belediyespor	9	(0)

Managerial career
- 2017–2018: Balıkesirspor (youth)
- 2018: Balıkesirspor (U21 assistant)
- 2018–2019: Balıkesirspor (assistant)
- 2020: Balıkesirspor (assistant)
- 2020–2021: Akhisarspor (assistant)
- 2021–2022: Akhisarspor (assistant)
- 2022–: Balıkesirspor (assistant)
- 2022: Balıkesirspor (caretaker)
- * Club domestic league appearances and goals

Yunus İçuz (born 27 March 1983) is a Turkish professional football coach and a former player who played as an attacking midfielder. He is an assistant coach with Balıkesirspor.

== Club career ==
He started his career in Balıkesirspor but he signed his first professional contract with Kartalspor (2001–04, 42 match 5 goals) and then he also played for Maltepespor (2004–06, 14 match 3 goals), Balıkesirspor (2006–07, 20 match 1 goal), Darıca Gençlerbirliği (2007–08, 18 match 1 goal).

He became a popular player among Balkes supporters due to his goal-scoring performances and positive rapport with fans.

Sometimes he is known as Yunus İçöz in media.
