= Mehmet Çolak =

Turkish footballer

Personal information
- Full name: Mehmet Çolak
- Date of birth: 22 October 1995 (age 31)
- Place of birth: Oğuzeli, Turkey
- Position: Winger

Youth career
- 2010–2013: Gaziantepspor

Senior career*
Years	Team	Apps	(Gls)
2013–2015	Gaziantepspor	1	(0)
- * Club domestic league appearances and goals as of 10 August 2015

Mehmet Çolak (born 22 October 1995) is a Turkish footballer who played one match for Gaziantepspor in Süper Lig on 17 May 2014.
