= Zafer Biryol =

Turkish footballer

Personal information
- Full name: Zafer Biryol
- Date of birth: 2 October 1976 (age 50)
- Place of birth: Rize, Turkey
- Height: 1.82 m (6 ft 0 in)
- Position: Forward

Youth career
- Beşiktaş

Senior career*
Years	Team	Apps	(Gls)
1996–1998	Beşiktaş	0	(0)
1996–1997	→ Mersin İdmanyurdu (loan)	34	(5)
1997–1998	→ Edirnespor (loan)	26	(6)
1998–1999	Yeni Salihlispor	17	(6)
1999–2001	Çamlıdere Şekerspor	65	(34)
2001–2003	Göztepe	53	(13)
2003–2005	Konyaspor	64	(43)
2005–2006	Fenerbahçe	6	(0)
2006–2007	Bursaspor	12	(3)
2007–2008	Çaykur Rizespor	42	(8)
2008–2009	Mersin İdmanyurdu	30	(16)
2009–2010	Altay	17	(5)
2010–2011	Anadolu Selçukluspor	7	(0)
Total		373	(139)

International career
2004	Turkey	5	(1)
- * Club domestic league appearances and goals

Zafer Biryol (born 2 October 1976) is a retired Turkish professional footballer. He last played as a forward for Anadolu Selçukluspor. He is 1.82 meters tall and weighs 75 kilograms.

== Club career ==
He was the Super Lig's top scorer in the 2004–05 season with Konyaspor. During the 2005/06 season, Zafer was transferred to Big Three club Fenerbahçe. He did not play in many games, as he was used primarily as a backup. A surplus to requirements, Zafer was transferred to Bursaspor early in the 2006/07 season. He was transferred to Çaykur Rizespor at mid of 2006/07 season. Biryol retired from being a football player in 2011.

== International career ==
He appeared in five matches for the senior Turkey national football team, debuting as a second-half substitute in a friendly against Denmark on 18 February 2004.

== Prosecution ==
In January 2020 he was sentenced to 6 years and 3 months imprisonment for being a member of an armed terror organization due to his links to the Gülen movement.
