= Altan Aksoy =

Turkish footballer (born 1976)

Altan Aksoy (born 5 February 1976) is a Turkish footballer who last played as midfielder for the Giresun-based Giresunspor.

== Career ==
Born in Rize, Aksoy began playing football for Göztepe S.K. in 1994. He would play for Süper Lig sides İstanbulspor A.Ş., Adanaspor, Kocaelispor, Konyaspor, Galatasaray S.K., Çaykur Rizespor and Giresunspor.
