= Aytekin Viduşlu =

Turkish footballer (born 1978)

Personal information
- Date of birth: 28 August 1978 (age 48)
- Place of birth: Manisa, Turkey
- Height: 1.75 m (5 ft 9 in)
- Position: Centre-back

Senior career*
Years	Team	Apps	(Gls)
1997–2000	Dardanelspor	38	(0)
1998	→ Yeni Salihlispor (loan)	12	(0)
2000–2003	Altay	89	(2)
2003–2005	Istanbulspor	81	(0)
2005–2008	Antalyaspor	15	(0)
2008–2009	Orduspor	33	(4)
2008–2010	Mersin İdmanyurdu	27	(0)
2010–2011	Balıkesirspor	29	(2)

International career
1993	Turkey U15	1	(0)
1994–1995	Turkey U16	24	(0)
1996	Turkey U18	3	(0)

Managerial career
- 2015–2016: Düzcespor (assistant)
- 2016–2018: Manisaspor (U21)
- 2018: Manisaspor
- 2018: Bursaspor (assistant)
- * Club domestic league appearances and goals

Aytekin Viduşlu (born 28 August 1978) is a Turkish professional football coach and a former player. He played captain of the team against Belediye Vanspor match after Yunus İçuz's missing.
