= Birol Parlak =

Turkish footballer (born 1990)

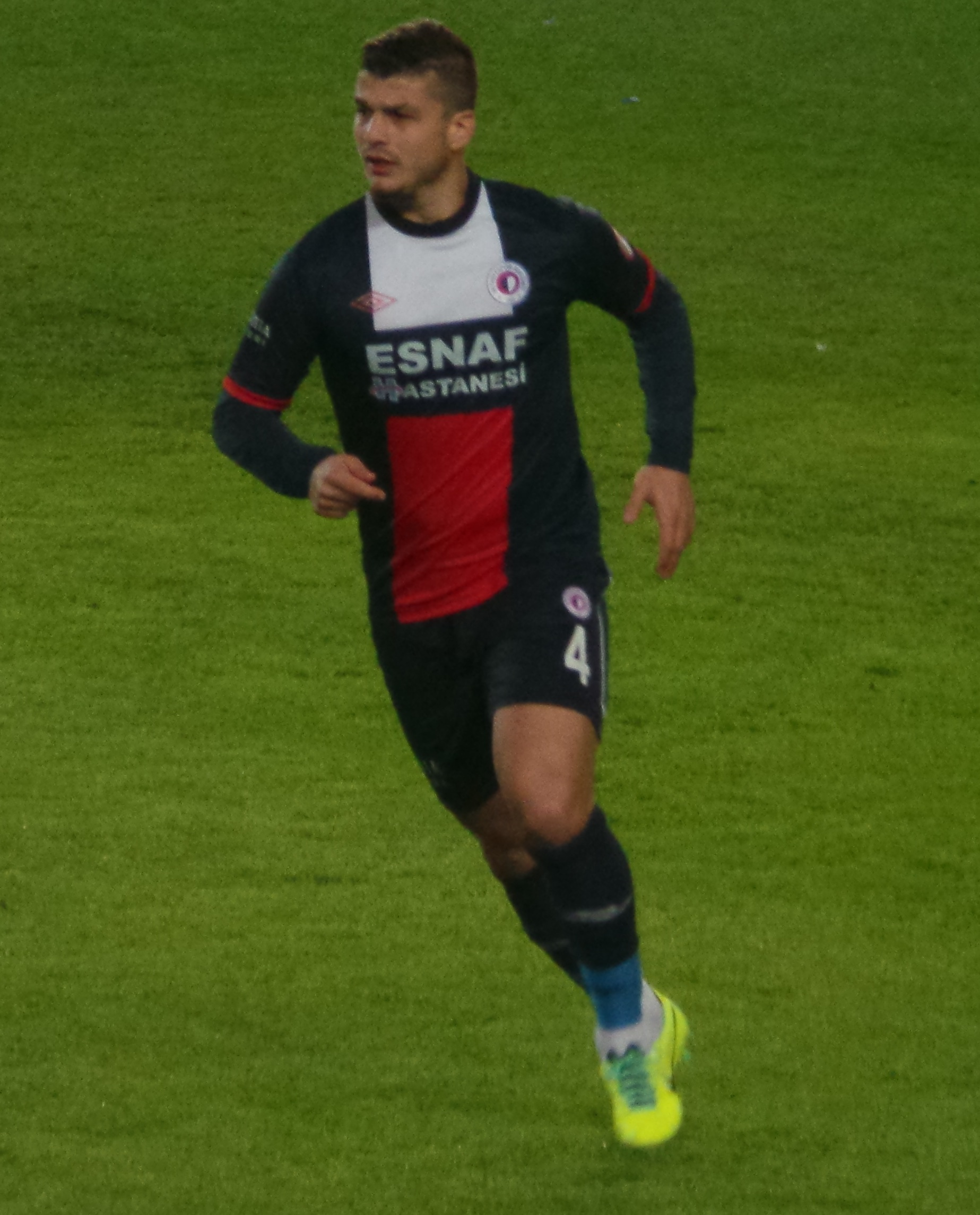

Personal information
- Date of birth: 1 March 1990 (age 36)
- Place of birth: Rize, Turkey
- Height: 1.82 m (6 ft 0 in)
- Positions: Centre back; full-back

Youth career
- 2002–2008: Mersin Idmanyurdu

Senior career*
| Years | Team | Apps | (Gls) |
| 2008–2011 | Mersin Idmanyurdu | 23 | (0) |
| 2011–2012 | Tepecikspor | 12 | (2) |
| 2012 | Tarsus Idman Yurdu | 2 | (0) |
| 2012–2013 | Çamlıdere Şekerspor | 31 | (0) |
| 2013–2014 | Fethiyespor | 24 | (1) |
| 2014–2016 | Eskişehirspor | 29 | (0) |
| 2016 | Kayserispor | 3 | (0) |
| 2016–2018 | Alanyaspor | 8 | (0) |
| 2018–2019 | Ümraniyespor | 2 | (0) |
| 2019–2020 | Kırşehir Belediyespor | 25 | (0) |
| 2020–2024 | Balıkesirspor | 78 | (0) |
| 2024–2025 | Yeni Mersin İY | 12 | (0) |

International career
| 2014 | Turkey B | 2 | (0) |
- * Club domestic league appearances and goals as of 3 May 2025

Birol Parlak (born 1 March 1990) is a Turkish footballer.
