= Bucaspor =

Turkish football club

- Full name: Bucaspor Kulübü
- Nickname: Fırtına (Storm)
- Founded: 11 March 1928; 97 years ago
- Dissolved: 1 September 2020; 5 years ago
- Ground: Buca Arena, İzmir
- Capacity: 8,800
- Website: www.bucaspor.org.tr

Bucaspor was a professional Turkish football club based in Buca, İzmir. Formed in 1928, Bucaspor were nicknamed Fırtına (Storm). The club colours were yellow and navy. It was dissolved in 2020.

== History ==
At the time of its formation, Bucaspor was the fifth football club to be based in İzmir, following Karşıyaka S.K. (1912), Altay S.K. (1914), Altınordu S.K. (1923), and Göztepe A.Ş. (1925). Yellow and navy were chosen for the club colours. Former president Yusuf Muhafiz pushed to make red one of the colours of the club, to distinguish it from Istanbul-based club Fenerbahçe. The colour has since been removed. Bucaspor merged with Altay and Altınordu as Üçokspor in 1937. These clubs were separated again in 1939.

The club did not compete professionally for most of its history till 1984–85 season. They were promoted to the 2.Lig after beating Edremitspor 1–0 on 6 May 1990, which gave them professional status. Bucaspor reached the play-offs of the 2.Lig twice, in 1994 and 1996, but failed to win promotion to the 1.Lig.

The club earned promoted to the top-flight of the Turkish football pyramid on 8 May 2010. Their 4–0 win over Kayseri Erciyesspor sealed their second-place finish in the TFF First League, which resulted in automatic promotion to the Süper Lig. However, Bucaspor relegated after one year in Super League. Bucaspor also played quarter final in Turkish Cup in 2011.

In 2005 a women's football team of Bucaspor was established. The Bucaspor Ladies Football Team finished runner-up in the Turkish Women's Football Premier League in 2008 and 2009.

Due to the coronavirus epidemic and financial debts in the 2020–21 season, Bucaspor decided not to participate in the amateur league and folded on September 1, 2020.

== Bucaspor Football Academy ==
Bucaspor is very famous club with football academy in Turkey. The academy founded in 2007. Before this time Bucaspor educated important players for Turkish football. Some of these players are Mehmet Batdal, Sercan Kaya, Hasan Kabze, Koray Arslan and Kamil Ahmet Çörekçi.

Bucaspor's young teams had a lot of championship in Turkey. The most important success was the championship of Premier Cup in 2010. Bucaspor management made a decision that all the young teams would play all their matches with team who younger one age. They have been playing about this since 2010–2011 season. Also Şirinyerspor and Buca Belediyespor are pilot teams of Bucaspor. Bucaspor and Galatasaray have the biggest football academy in Turkey.

== Honours ==
- 1.Lig:
  - Runners-up (1): 2010
- 2.Lig:
  - Winners (1): 2009
- 3.Lig:
  - Winners (1): 1990
- TSYD Cup:
  - Winners (1): 2008
- İzmir Football League:
  - Winners (1): 1937–38
- Turkish Cup:
  - Quarter Final (1): 2010–11

== League participations ==
- Super League

2010–2011

- First League

1990–2001, 2009–2010, 2011–2015

- Second League

1984–1990, 2001–2009, 2015–2018

- Third League

2018–2019

- Turkish Regional Amateur League

2019–2020

- İzmir Regional League

1928–1984

== Rivalry ==
Bucaspor has rivalries with other İzmir teams which include Göztepe, Karşıyaka, Altay, Altınordu and İzmirspor.
