= 2000–01 Turkish Cup =

Türkiye Kupası

Tournament details
- Country: Turkey
- Teams: 64

Final positions
- Champions: Gençlerbirliği
- Runners-up: Fenerbahçe

Tournament statistics
- Top goal scorer(s): Ümit Karan (7 goals)

The 2000–01 Turkish Cup was the 39th edition of the annual tournament that determined the association football Süper Lig Turkish Cup (Turkish: Türkiye Kupası) champion under the auspices of the Turkish Football Federation (Turkish: Türkiye Futbol Federasyonu; TFF). Gençlerbirliği successfully contested Fenerbahçe in the final after penalty shoot-out. The results of the tournament also determined which clubs would be promoted or relegated.

== First round ==
Team 1	Score	Team 2
Cizrespor	5–0	Mardinspor
Batman Petrolspor	2–3	Elazığspor
Hatayspor	2–3	Gaziantep BB
Şanlıurfaspor	1–0	Kahramanmaraşspor
Gümüşhane Doğanspor	3–0	Artvin Hopaspor
Ağrıspor	w/o	Akçaabat Sebatspor
Şekerspor	3–2 (aet)	Kırıkkalespor
Türk Telekom	3–2	Hacılar Erciyesspor
Ankaraspor	3–3 (3–4 p)	Boluspor
Kardemir Karabükspor	5–0	Karadeniz Ereğlispor
Yeni Turgutluspor	0–2	Aydınspor
Balıkesirspor	0–1	Bucaspor
Karşıyaka	0–2	Ispartaspor
Yeni Salihlispor	2–0	Yeni Afyonspor
Bakırköy	2–3 (aet)	Güngören Belediyespor
İstanbul BB	2–1	Beykoz
Çorluspor	0–1	Öz Sahrayıceditspor
Kırklarelispor	1–2	Gaziosmanpaşa

== Second round ==
Team 1	Score	Team 2
Konyaspor	2–1	Ispartaspor
Diyarbakırspor	2–1	Gaziantep BB
Şanlıurfaspor	2–1	Elazığspor
Cizrespor	0–1	Siirt Jetpa
Yimpaş Yozgatspor	1–2	Akçaabat Sebatspor
Gümüşhane Doğanspor	3–3 (3–5 p)	Çaykur Rizespor
Mobellaspor	1–1 (4–2 p)	Kayserispor
Şekerspor	3–1	Kardemir Karabükspor
Türk Telekom	2–1	Boluspor
Bucaspor	3–0	Aydınspor
Yeni Salihlispor	2–0	İzmirspor
Gaziosmanpaşa	1–2	Çanakkale Dardanelspor
Güngören Belediyespor	1–2	Öz Sahrayıceditspor
İstanbul BB	4–2	Sarıyer

== Third round ==
Team 1	Score	Team 2
Çanakkale Dardanelspor	2–3	Ankaragücü
Altay	1–2	Trabzonspor
Öz Sahrayıceditspor	0–3	Beşiktaş
Şanlıurfaspor	0–2	Antalyaspor
Akçaabat Sebatspor	0–2	Gaziantepspor
İstanbul BB	0–1	Çaykur Rizespor
İstanbulspor	5–0	Türk Telekom
Adanaspor	6–3	Konyaspor
Gençlerbirliği	7–1	Mobellaspor
Samsunspor	0–1	Göztepe
Kocaelispor	8–1	Şekerspor
Yeni Salihlispor	0–1	Denizlispor
Bucaspor	1–4	Bursaspor
Diyarbakırspor	3–0	Erzurumspor
Fenerbahçe	7–3	Siirt Jet-PA
Galatasaray	7–0	Vanspor

== Fourth round ==
Team 1	Score	Team 2
Bursaspor	1–2	Fenerbahçe
Çaykur Rizespor	1–2	Gençlerbirliği
İstanbulspor	2–0	Diyarbakırspor
Kocaelispor	2–1	Denizlispor
Ankaragücü	4–0	Göztepe
Gaziantepspor	1–3	Trabzonspor
Antalyaspor	1–2	Beşiktaş
Galatasaray	2–1	Adanaspor

== Bracket ==
Quarter-finals
Gençlerbirliği (a.e.t.)	4
Kocaelispor	2
İstanbulspor	0
Beşiktaş	3
Trabzonspor	1
Galatasaray	4
Ankaragücü	1
Fenerbahçe (a.e.t.)	3

Semi-finals
Gençlerbirliği (p)	1 (4)
Beşiktaş	1 (2)
Galatasaray	4 (2)
Fenerbahçe (p)	4 (3)

Final
Gençlerbirliği (p)	2 (4)
Fenerbahçe	2 (1)

== Quarter-finals ==
Team 1	Score	Team 2
Gençlerbirliği	4–2	Kocaelispor
Trabzonspor	1–4	Galatasaray
İstanbulspor	0–3	Beşiktaş
Ankaragücü	1–3	Fenerbahçe

== Semi-finals ==
=== Summary table ===
Team 1	Score	Team 2
Fenerbahçe	4–4 (3–2 p)	Galatasaray
Beşiktaş	1–1 (2–4 p)	Gençlerbirliği

=== Matches ===
7 February 2001 Semi-final	Fenerbahçe	4–4 (a.e.t.) (3–2 p)	Galatasaray	Istanbul, Turkey
20:30 EET (UTC+02)	Ogün 22'; Serhat 29'; Johnson 37'; Revivo 66'	Report	Emre 5'; Hasan 52'; Jardel 84'; Ümit 90' (pen.)	Stadium: Şükrü Saracoğlu Stadium; Referee: Metin Tokat
	Penalties
	Ogün (penalty scored); Rapaić (penalty scored); Johnson (penalty missed); Lazetić (penalty scored)		(penalty scored) Emre; (penalty missed) Hasan; (penalty missed) Ümit; (penalty scored) Arif; (penalty missed) Jardel

8 February 2001 Semi-final	Beşiktaş	1–1 (a.e.t.) (2–4 p)	Gençlerbirliği	Istanbul, Turkey
20:30 EET (UTC+02)	Nihat 66'	Report	Zdebel 78'	Stadium: BJK İnönü Stadium; Referee: Erol Ersoy
	Penalties
	Mehmet (penalty scored); Yasin (penalty missed); Ali Eren (penalty scored); Fazlı (penalty missed)		(penalty scored) Zdebel; (penalty scored) İsmail; (penalty scored) İdris; (penalty scored) Tolga

== Final ==
11 April 2001 Final	Fenerbahçe	2–2 (a.e.t.) (1–4 p)	Gençlerbirliği	Kayseri, Turkey
19:30 EEST (UTC+03)	Johnson 6'; Andersson 65'	Report	Mbayo 13'; Ümit 54'	Stadium: Kayseri Atatürk Stadium; Attendance: 18,000; Referee: Ali Aydın
	Penalties
	Ogün (penalty missed); Rapaić (penalty scored); Serhat (penalty missed)		(penalty scored) N'Gole; (penalty scored) Zdebel; (penalty scored) İsmail; (penalty scored) Tolga
