= Iran national football team results =

- Win Draw Loss

The following is a list of Iran national football team results in its official international matches.

== 1940s ==
#	Date	Opponent	Result	Score	Venue	Competition
1	25-Aug-41	Afghanistan	D	0–0	Kabul, Afghanistan	Friendly
2	26-Oct-49	Afghanistan	W	4–0	Tehran	Friendly

== 1950s ==
#	Date	Opponent	Result	Score	Venue	Competition
3	28-May-50	Turkey	L	1–6	Istanbul, Turkey	Friendly
4	27-Oct-50	Pakistan	W	5–1	Tehran	Friendly
5	05-Mar-51	Burma	W	2–0	New Delhi, India	1951 Asian Games
6	07-Mar-51	Japan	D	0–0	New Delhi, India	1951 Asian Games
7	08-Mar-51	Japan	W	3–2	New Delhi, India	1951 Asian Games
8	10-May-51	India	L	0–1	New Delhi, India	1951 Asian Games
9	23-Apr-52	Pakistan	D	0–0	Karachi, Pakistan	Friendly
10	26-May-58	Israel	L	0–4	Tokyo, Japan	1958 Asian Games
11	28-May-58	South Korea	L	0–5	Tokyo, Japan	1958 Asian Games
12	05-Dec-59	Israel	W	3–0	Kochi, India	1960 Asian Cup Qualifier
13	09-Dec-59	Pakistan	L	1–4	Kochi, India	1960 Asian Cup Qualifier
14	11-Dec-59	India	L	1–3	Kochi, India	1960 Asian Cup Qualifier
15	12-Dec-59	Israel	D	1–1	Kochi, India	1960 Asian Cup Qualifier
16	14-Dec-59	Pakistan	W	4–1	Kochi, India	1960 Asian Cup Qualifier
17	18-Dec-59	India	W	2–1	Kochi, India	1960 Asian Cup Qualifier

== 1960s ==
#	Date	Opponent	Result	Score	Venue	Competition
18	01-Jun-62	Iraq	D	1–1	Tehran	Friendly
19	03-Jun-62	Iraq	L	1–2	Tehran	Friendly
20	23-Jul-65	Pakistan	W	4–1	Tehran	1965 RCD Cup
21	25-Jul-65	Turkey	D	0–0	Tehran	1965 RCD Cup
22	16-Mar-66	Turkey	D	0–0	Tehran	Friendly
23	10-Dec-66	Malaysia	W	2–0	Bangkok, Thailand	1966 Asian Games
24	11-Dec-66	Japan	L	1–3	Bangkok, Thailand	1966 Asian Games
25	13-Dec-66	India	W	4–1	Bangkok, Thailand	1966 Asian Games
26	16-Dec-66	Indonesia	W	1–0	Bangkok, Thailand	1966 Asian Games
27	17-Dec-66	Burma	L	0–1	Bangkok, Thailand	1966 Asian Games
28	18-Dec-66	Japan	W	1–0	Bangkok, Thailand	1966 Asian Games
29	20-Dec-66	Burma	L	0–1	Bangkok, Thailand	1966 Asian Games
30	24-Nov-67	Pakistan	W	2–0	Dhaka, Pakistan	1967 RCD Cup
31	26-Nov-67	Turkey	L	0–1	Dhaka, Pakistan	1967 RCD Cup
32	10-May-68	Hong Kong	W	2–0	Tehran	1968 Asian Cup
33	13-May-68	Taiwan	W	4–0	Tehran	1968 Asian Cup
34	16-May-68	Burma	W	3–1	Tehran	1968 Asian Cup
35	19-May-68	Israel	W	2–1	Tehran	1968 Asian Cup
36	07-Mar-69	Iraq	W	2–1	Tehran	1969 Friendship Cup
37	12-Mar-69	Pakistan	W	9–1	Tehran	1969 Friendship Cup
38	13-Sep-69	Pakistan	W	4–2	Ankara, Turkey	1969 RCD Cup
39	17-Sep-69	Turkey	L	0–4	Ankara, Turkey	1969 RCD Cup

== 1970s ==
#	Date	Opponent	Result	Score	Venue	Competition
40	01-Sep-70	Pakistan	W	7–0	Tehran	1970 RCD Cup
41	10-Dec-70	Indonesia	D	2–2	Bangkok, Thailand	1970 Asian Games
42	11-Dec-70	South Korea	L	0–1	Bangkok, Thailand	1970 Asian Games
43	10-Sep-71	South Korea	L	0–2	Seoul, South Korea	Friendly
44	12-Sep-71	South Korea	W	2–0	Seoul, South Korea	Friendly
45	07-May-72	Khmer Republic	W	2–0	Bangkok, Thailand	1972 Asian Cup
46	09-May-72	Iraq	W	3–0	Bangkok, Thailand	1972 Asian Cup
47	13-May-72	Thailand	W	3–2	Bangkok, Thailand	1972 Asian Cup
48	16-May-72	Khmer Republic	W	2–1	Bangkok, Thailand	1972 Asian Cup
49	19-May-72	South Korea	W	2–1	Bangkok, Thailand	1972 Asian Cup
50	11-Jun-72	Republic of Ireland	L	1–2	Recife, Brazil	1972 Brazil Independence Cup
51	14-Jun-72	Portugal	L	0–3	Recife, Brazil	1972 Brazil Independence Cup
52	21-Jun-72	Ecuador	D	1–1	Recife, Brazil	1972 Brazil Independence Cup
53	25-Jun-72	Chile	L	1–2	Recife, Brazil	1972 Brazil Independence Cup
54	04-May-73	North Korea	D	0–0	Tehran	1974 World Cup Qualifier
55	06-May-73	Kuwait	W	2–1	Tehran	1974 World Cup Qualifier
56	08-May-73	Syria	W	1–0	Tehran	1974 World Cup Qualifier
57	11-May-73	North Korea	W	2–1	Tehran	1974 World Cup Qualifier
58	13-May-73	Kuwait	W	2–0	Tehran	1974 World Cup Qualifier
59	15-May-73	Syria	L	0–1	Tehran	1974 World Cup Qualifier
60	12-Aug-73	New Zealand	D	0–0	Auckland, New Zealand	Friendly
61	18-Aug-73	Australia	L	0–3	Sydney, Australia	1974 World Cup Qualifier
62	24-Aug-73	Australia	W	2–0	Tehran	1974 World Cup Qualifier
63	03-Sep-74	Pakistan	W	7–0	Tehran	1974 Asian Games
64	05-Sep-74	Burma	W	2–1	Tehran	1974 Asian Games
65	07-Sep-74	Bahrain	W	6–0	Tehran	1974 Asian Games
66	09-Sep-74	Malaysia	W	1–0	Tehran	1974 Asian Games
67	11-Sep-74	South Korea	W	2–0	Tehran	1974 Asian Games
68	13-Sep-74	Iraq	W	1–0	Tehran	1974 Asian Games
69	15-Sep-74	Israel	W	1–0	Tehran	1974 Asian Games
70	20-Dec-74	Czechoslovakia	L	0–1	Tehran	Friendly
71	10-Aug-75	Hungary	L	1–2	Tehran	Friendly
72	04-Jun-76	Iraq	W	2–0	Tehran	1976 Asian Cup
73	08-Jun-76	South Yemen	W	8–0	Tehran	1976 Asian Cup
74	11-Jun-76	China	W	2–0	Tehran	1976 Asian Cup
75	13-Jun-76	Kuwait	W	1–0	Tehran	1976 Asian Cup
76	02-Jul-76	Romania	D	2–2	Tehran	Friendly
77	07-Jan-77	Saudi Arabia	W	3–0	Riyadh, Saudi Arabia	1978 World Cup Qualifier
78	28-Jan-77	Syria	W	1–0	Damascus, Syria	1978 World Cup Qualifier
79	15-Mar-77	Hungary	L	0–2	Tehran	Friendly
80	22-Mar-77	Argentina	D	1–1	Madrid, Spain	75th Anniversary of Real Madrid
81	06-Apr-77	Syria	W	2–0	Shiraz	1978 World Cup Qualifier
82	22-Apr-77	Saudi Arabia	W	2–0	Shiraz	1978 World Cup Qualifier
83	19-Jun-77	Hong Kong	W	2–0	Hong Kong	1978 World Cup Qualifier
84	03-Jul-77	South Korea	D	0–0	Busan, South Korea	1978 World Cup Qualifier
85	05-Aug-77	Romania	D	0–0	Tehran	Friendly
86	14-Aug-77	Australia	W	1–0	Melbourne, Australia	1978 World Cup Qualifier
87	28-Oct-77	Kuwait	W	1–0	Tehran	1978 World Cup Qualifier
88	11-Nov-77	South Korea	D	2–2	Tehran	1978 World Cup Qualifier
89	18-Nov-77	Hong Kong	W	3–0	Tehran	1978 World Cup Qualifier
90	25-Nov-77	Australia	W	1–0	Tehran	1978 World Cup Qualifier
91	02-Dec-77	Kuwait	W	2–1	Kuwait City, Kuwait	1978 World Cup Qualifier
92	05-Apr-78	Yugoslavia	D	0–0	Tehran	Friendly
93	18-Apr-78	Wales	L	0–1	Tehran	Friendly
94	26-Apr-78	Bulgaria	D	1–1	Tehran	Friendly
95	11-May-78	France	L	1–2	Toulouse, France	Friendly
96	19-May-78	Ghana	W	3–0	Tehran	1978 Afro-Asian Cup
97	03-Jun-78	Netherlands	L	0–3	Mendoza, Argentina	1978 World Cup
98	07-Jun-78	Scotland	D	1–1	Córdoba, Argentina	1978 World Cup
99	11-Jun-78	Peru	L	1–4	Córdoba, Argentina	1978 World Cup
100	06-Sep-78	Soviet Union	L	0–1	Tehran	Friendly

== 1980s ==
#	Date	Opponent	Result	Score	Venue	Competition
101	05-Aug-80	United Arab Emirates	W	2–0	Al-Ain, United Arab Emirates	Friendly
102	07-Aug-80	United Arab Emirates	W	3–0	Abu Dhabi, United Arab Emirates	Friendly
103	17-Sep-80	Syria	D	0–0	Kuwait City, Kuwait	1980 Asian Cup
104	20-Sep-80	China	D	2–2	Kuwait City, Kuwait	1980 Asian Cup
105	22-Sep-80	Bangladesh	W	7–0	Kuwait City, Kuwait	1980 Asian Cup
106	24-Sep-80	North Korea	W	3–2	Kuwait City, Kuwait	1980 Asian Cup
107	28-Sep-80	Kuwait	L	1–2	Kuwait City, Kuwait	1980 Asian Cup
108	29-Sep-80	North Korea	W	3–0	Kuwait City, Kuwait	1980 Asian Cup
109	19-Feb-82	Nepal	W	4–0	Karachi, Pakistan	1982 Quaid-e-Azam Tournament
110	21-Feb-82	Pakistan	W	1–0	Karachi, Pakistan	1982 Quaid-e-Azam Tournament
111	23-Feb-82	Oman	W	4–0	Karachi, Pakistan	1982 Quaid-e-Azam Tournament
112	25-Feb-82	Bangladesh	W	9–0	Karachi, Pakistan	1982 Quaid-e-Azam Tournament
113	21-Nov-82	Japan	L	0–1	New Delhi, India	1982 Asian Games
114	23-Nov-82	South Korea	W	1–0	New Delhi, India	1982 Asian Games
115	25-Nov-82	South Yemen	W	2–0	New Delhi, India	1982 Asian Games
116	28-Nov-82	Kuwait	L	0–1	New Delhi, India	1982 Asian Games
117	07-Aug-84	Bangladesh	W	5–0	Jakarta, Indonesia	1984 Asian Cup Qualifier
118	09-Aug-84	Syria	W	3–1	Jakarta, Indonesia	1984 Asian Cup Qualifier
119	11-Aug-84	Thailand	W	5–0	Jakarta, Indonesia	1984 Asian Cup Qualifier
120	13-Aug-84	Indonesia	W	1–0	Jakarta, Indonesia	1984 Asian Cup Qualifier
121	15-Aug-84	Philippines	W	7–1	Jakarta, Indonesia	1984 Asian Cup Qualifier
122	18-Aug-84	Syria	W	1–0	Jakarta, Indonesia	1984 Asian Cup Qualifier
123	01-Dec-84	United Arab Emirates	W	3–0	Singapore	1984 Asian Cup
124	03-Dec-84	China	W	2–0	Singapore	1984 Asian Cup
125	07-Dec-84	India	D	0–0	Singapore	1984 Asian Cup
126	10-Dec-84	Singapore	D	1–1	Singapore	1984 Asian Cup
127	13-Dec-84	Saudi Arabia	D	1–1	Singapore	1984 Asian Cup
128	16-Dec-84	Kuwait	D	1–1	Singapore	1984 Asian Cup
129	20-Jan-85	Yugoslavia	L	1–3	Kochi, India	1985 Nehru Cup
130	28-Jan-85	Soviet Union	L	0–2	Kochi, India	1985 Nehru Cup
131	05-Feb-85	North Korea	W	1–0	Mashhad	Friendly
132	16-Feb-86	Pakistan	W	2–0	Tehran	1986 Fajr Cup
133	20-Feb-86	Ghana	W	2–0	Tehran	1986 Fajr Cup
134	28-May-86	China	L	1–2	Beijing, China	Friendly
135	20-Sep-86	Thailand	W	4–0	Seoul, South Korea	Friendly
136	22-Sep-86	Japan	W	2–0	Daejeon, South Korea	1986 Asian Games
137	24-Sep-86	Bangladesh	W	4–0	Daejeon, South Korea	1986 Asian Games
138	26-Sep-86	Kuwait	L	0–1	Daejeon, South Korea	1986 Asian Games
139	28-Sep-86	Nepal	W	6–0	Daejeon, South Korea	1986 Asian Games
140	01-Oct-86	South Korea	D	1–1	Busan, South Korea	1986 Asian Games
141	27-May-88	Hong Kong	W	2–0	Kathmandu, Nepal	1988 Asian Cup Qualifier
142	29-May-88	Syria	D	1–1	Kathmandu, Nepal	1988 Asian Cup Qualifier
143	02-Jun-88	North Korea	D	0–0	Kathmandu, Nepal	1988 Asian Cup Qualifier
144	04-Jun-88	Nepal	W	3–0	Kathmandu, Nepal	1988 Asian Cup Qualifier
145	02-Dec-88	Qatar	W	2–0	Doha, Qatar	1988 Asian Cup
146	04-Dec-88	Japan	D	0–0	Doha, Qatar	1988 Asian Cup
147	08-Dec-88	United Arab Emirates	W	1–0	Doha, Qatar	1988 Asian Cup
148	11-Dec-88	South Korea	L	0–3	Doha, Qatar	1988 Asian Cup
149	15-Dec-88	Saudi Arabia	L	0–1	Doha, Qatar	1988 Asian Cup
150	17-Dec-88	China	D	0–0	Doha, Qatar	1988 Asian Cup
151	20-Jan-89	Japan	D	2–2	Tehran	Friendly
152	23-Feb-89	Thailand	W	3–0	Bangkok, Thailand	1990 World Cup Qualifier
153	27-Feb-89	Bangladesh	W	2–1	Dhaka, Bangladesh	1990 World Cup Qualifier
154	17-Mar-89	Bangladesh	W	1–0	Tehran	1990 World Cup Qualifier
155	30-May-89	Thailand	W	3–0	Tehran	1990 World Cup Qualifier
156	15-Jul-89	China	L	0–2	Shenyang, China	1990 World Cup Qualifier
157	22-Jul-89	China	W	3–2	Tehran	1990 World Cup Qualifier
158	01-Nov-89	South Yemen	W	2–0	Kuwait City, Kuwait	1989 Peace and Friendship Cup
159	03-Nov-89	Guinea	D	1–1	Kuwait City, Kuwait	1989 Peace and Friendship Cup
160	05-Nov-89	Iraq	D	0–0	Kuwait City, Kuwait	1989 Peace and Friendship Cup
161	08-Nov-89	Uganda	D	2–2	Kuwait City, Kuwait	1989 Peace and Friendship Cup
162	12-Nov-89	Kuwait	L	0–1	Kuwait City, Kuwait	1989 Peace and Friendship Cup

== 1990s ==
#	Date	Opponent	Result	Score	Venue	Competition
163	02-Feb-90	Poland	L	0–2	Tehran	Friendly
164	04-Feb-90	Poland	L	0–1	Tehran	Friendly
165	24-Sep-90	Malaysia	W	3–0	Beijing, China	1990 Asian Games
166	28-Sep-90	North Korea	W	2–1	Beijing, China	1990 Asian Games
167	01-Oct-90	Japan	W	1–0	Beijing, China	1990 Asian Games
168	03-Oct-90	South Korea	W	1–0	Beijing, China	1990 Asian Games
169	06-Oct-90	North Korea	D	0–0	Beijing, China	1990 Asian Games
170	27-Sep-91	Algeria	W	2–1	Tehran	1991 Afro-Asian Cup
171	13-Oct-91	Algeria	L	0–1	Algiers, Algeria	1991 Afro-Asian Cup
172	11-May-92	Pakistan	W	7–0	Kolkata, India	1992 Asian Cup Qualifier
173	13-May-92	India	W	3–0	Kolkata, India	1992 Asian Cup Qualifier
174	02-Oct-92	Cameroon	D	1–1	Tehran	Friendly
175	04-Oct-92	Cameroon	D	0–0	Tehran	Friendly
176	18-Oct-92	Kuwait	D	1–1	Kuwait City, Kuwait	Friendly
177	30-Oct-92	North Korea	W	2–0	Onomichi, Japan	1992 Asian Cup
178	01-Nov-92	United Arab Emirates	D	0–0	Hiroshima, Japan	1992 Asian Cup
179	03-Nov-92	Japan	L	0–1	Hiroshima, Japan	1992 Asian Cup
180	06-Jun-93	Pakistan	W	5–0	Tehran	1993 ECO Cup
181	08-Jun-93	Turkmenistan	W	2–1	Tehran	1993 ECO Cup
182	13-Jun-93	Tajikistan	W	1–0	Tehran	1993 ECO Cup
183	14-Jun-93	Turkmenistan	W	2–1	Tehran	1993 ECO Cup
184	23-Jun-93	Oman	D	0–0	Tehran	1994 World Cup Qualifier
185	25-Jun-93	Chinese Taipei	W	6–0	Tehran	1994 World Cup Qualifier
186	27-Jun-93	Syria	D	1–1	Tehran	1994 World Cup Qualifier
187	02-Jul-93	Oman	W	1–0	Damascus, Syria	1994 World Cup Qualifier
188	04-Jul-93	Chinese Taipei	W	6–0	Damascus, Syria	1994 World Cup Qualifier
189	06-Jul-93	Syria	D	1–1	Damascus, Syria	1994 World Cup Qualifier
190	16-Oct-93	South Korea	L	0–3	Doha, Qatar	1994 World Cup Qualifier
191	18-Oct-93	Japan	W	2–1	Doha, Qatar	1994 World Cup Qualifier
192	22-Oct-93	Iraq	L	1–2	Doha, Qatar	1994 World Cup Qualifier
193	25-Oct-93	North Korea	W	2–1	Doha, Qatar	1994 World Cup Qualifier
194	28-Oct-93	Saudi Arabia	L	3–4	Doha, Qatar	1994 World Cup Qualifier
195	03-Oct-94	Bahrain	D	0–0	Hiroshima, Japan	1994 Asian Games
196	05-Oct-94	Turkmenistan	D	1–1	Onomichi, Japan	1994 Asian Games
197	07-Oct-94	China	L	0–1	Hiroshima, Japan	1994 Asian Games
198	09-Oct-94	Yemen	W	4–0	Miyoshi, Japan	1994 Asian Games
199	26-Apr-96	Turkmenistan	D	1–1	Ashgabat, Turkmenistan	Friendly
200	28-Apr-96	Turkmenistan	L	0–1	Ashgabat, Turkmenistan	Friendly
201	17-May-96	Qatar	W	2–0	Tabriz	Friendly
202	27-May-96	Kuwait	D	2–2	Kuwait City, Kuwait	Friendly
203	30-May-96	Kuwait	W	2–1	Kuwait City, Kuwait	Friendly
204	01-Jun-96	Qatar	W	1–0	Doha, Qatar	Friendly
205	10-Jun-96	Nepal	W	8–0	Tehran	1996 Asian Cup Qualifier
206	12-Jun-96	Sri Lanka	W	7–0	Tehran	1996 Asian Cup Qualifier
207	14-Jun-96	Oman	W	2–0	Tehran	1996 Asian Cup Qualifier
208	17-Jun-96	Sri Lanka	W	4–0	Muscat, Oman	1996 Asian Cup Qualifier
209	19-Jun-96	Nepal	W	4–0	Muscat, Oman	1996 Asian Cup Qualifier
210	21-Jun-96	Oman	W	2–1	Muscat, Oman	1996 Asian Cup Qualifier
211	04-Oct-96	Kuwait	W	1–0	Kuwait City, Kuwait	Friendly
212	13-Nov-96	Lebanon	D	0–0	Beirut, Lebanon	Friendly
213	25-Nov-96	Turkmenistan	L	0–1	Tehran	Friendly
214	05-Dec-96	Iraq	L	1–2	Dubai, United Arab Emirates	1996 Asian Cup
215	08-Dec-96	Thailand	W	3–1	Dubai, United Arab Emirates	1996 Asian Cup
216	11-Dec-96	Saudi Arabia	W	3–0	Dubai, United Arab Emirates	1996 Asian Cup
217	16-Dec-96	South Korea	W	6–2	Dubai, United Arab Emirates	1996 Asian Cup
218	18-Dec-96	Saudi Arabia	D	0–0	Dubai, United Arab Emirates	1996 Asian Cup
219	21-Dec-96	Kuwait	D	1–1	Abu Dhabi, United Arab Emirates	1996 Asian Cup
220	11-Apr-97	Kuwait	W	2–0	Kuwait City, Kuwait	Friendly
221	21-Apr-97	Kenya	W	3–0	Tabriz	Friendly
222	27-Apr-97	China	D	0–0	Beijing, China	Friendly
223	02-Jun-97	Maldives	W	17–0	Damascus, Syria	1998 World Cup Qualifier
224	04-Jun-97	Kyrgyzstan	W	7–0	Damascus, Syria	1998 World Cup Qualifier
225	06-Jun-97	Syria	W	1–0	Damascus, Syria	1998 World Cup Qualifier
226	09-Jun-97	Kyrgyzstan	W	3–1	Tehran	1998 World Cup Qualifier
227	11-Jun-97	Maldives	W	9–0	Tehran	1998 World Cup Qualifier
228	13-Jun-97	Syria	D	2–2	Tehran	1998 World Cup Qualifier
229	17-Aug-97	Canada	W	1–0	Toronto, Canada	Friendly
230	02-Sep-97	United Arab Emirates	L	1–3	Abu Dhabi, United Arab Emirates	Friendly
231	13-Sep-97	China	W	4–2	Dalian, China	1998 World Cup Qualifier
232	19-Sep-97	Saudi Arabia	D	1–1	Tehran	1998 World Cup Qualifier
233	26-Sep-97	Kuwait	D	1–1	Kuwait City, Kuwait	1998 World Cup Qualifier
234	03-Oct-97	Qatar	W	3–0	Tehran	1998 World Cup Qualifier
235	17-Oct-97	China	W	4–1	Tehran	1998 World Cup Qualifier
236	24-Oct-97	Saudi Arabia	L	0–1	Riyadh, Saudi Arabia	1998 World Cup Qualifier
237	31-Oct-97	Kuwait	D	0–0	Tehran	1998 World Cup Qualifier
238	07-Nov-97	Qatar	L	0–2	Doha, Qatar	1998 World Cup Qualifier
239	16-Nov-97	Japan	L	2–3	Johor Bahru, Malaysia	1998 World Cup Qualifier
240	22-Nov-97	Australia	D	1–1	Tehran	1998 World Cup Qualifier
241	29-Nov-97	Australia	D	2–2	Melbourne, Australia	1998 World Cup Qualifier
242	28-Jan-98	Nigeria	L	0–1	Hong Kong	1998 Lunar New Year Cup
243	31-Jan-98	Chile	D	1–1	Hong Kong	1998 Lunar New Year Cup
244	14-Apr-98	Kuwait	D	1–1	Tabriz	Friendly
245	20-Apr-98	Hungary	L	0–2	Tehran	1998 LG Cup
246	22-Apr-98	Jamaica	W	1–0	Tehran	1998 LG Cup
247	03-Jun-98	Croatia	L	0–2	Rijeka, Croatia	Friendly
248	14-Jun-98	Yugoslavia	L	0–1	Saint-Étienne, France	1998 World Cup
249	21-Jun-98	United States	W	2–1	Lyon, France	1998 World Cup
250	25-Jun-98	Germany	L	0–2	Montpellier, France	1998 World Cup
251	13-Oct-98	Kuwait	L	0–3	Kuwait City, Kuwait	Friendly
252	01-Dec-98	Kazakhstan	W	2–0	Sisaket, Thailand	1998 Asian Games
253	05-Dec-98	Laos	W	6–1	Sisaket, Thailand	1998 Asian Games
254	08-Dec-98	Oman	L	2–4	Bangkok, Thailand	1998 Asian Games
255	10-Dec-98	Tajikistan	W	5–0	Bangkok, Thailand	1998 Asian Games
256	12-Dec-98	China	W	2–1	Bangkok, Thailand	1998 Asian Games
257	14-Dec-98	Uzbekistan	W	4–0	Bangkok, Thailand	1998 Asian Games
258	16-Dec-98	China	W	1–0	Bangkok, Thailand	1998 Asian Games
259	19-Dec-98	Kuwait	W	2–0	Bangkok, Thailand	1998 Asian Games
260	15-Feb-99	Kuwait	W	2–1	Kuwait City, Kuwait	1999 Ciao February Cup
261	02-Jun-99	Ecuador	D	1–1	Edmonton, Canada	1999 Canada Cup
262	04-Jun-99	Canada	W	1–0	Edmonton, Canada	1999 Canada Cup
263	06-Jun-99	Guatemala	D	2–2	Edmonton, Canada	1999 Canada Cup
264	08-Sep-99	Japan	D	1–1	Yokohama, Japan	1999 Kirin World Challenge
265	10-Oct-99	Denmark	D	0–0	Copenhagen, Denmark	Friendly

== 2000s ==
#	Date	Opponent	Result	Score	Venue	Competition
266	09-Jan-00	Mexico	L	1–2	Oakland, United States	Friendly
267	16-Jan-00	United States	D	1–1	Pasadena, United States	Friendly
268	04-Feb-00	Kuwait	D	1–1	Kuwait City, Kuwait	Friendly
269	22-Mar-00	Cyprus	D	0–0	Nicosia, Cyprus	Friendly
270	31-Mar-00	Maldives	W	8–0	Aleppo, Syria	2000 Asian Cup Qualifier
271	02-Apr-00	Syria	W	1–0	Aleppo, Syria	2000 Asian Cup Qualifier
272	04-Apr-00	Bahrain	L	0–1	Aleppo, Syria	2000 Asian Cup Qualifier
273	09-Apr-00	Bahrain	W	3–0	Tehran	2000 Asian Cup Qualifier
274	11-Apr-00	Syria	D	1–1	Tehran	2000 Asian Cup Qualifier
275	13-Apr-00	Maldives	W	3–0	Tehran	2000 Asian Cup Qualifier
276	24-May-00	Kazakhstan	W	3–0	Amman, Jordan	2000 WAFF Championship
277	26-May-00	Palestine	D	1–1	Amman, Jordan	2000 WAFF Championship
278	28-May-00	Syria	W	1–0	Amman, Jordan	2000 WAFF Championship
279	31-May-00	Jordan	W	1–0	Amman, Jordan	2000 WAFF Championship
280	02-Jun-00	Syria	W	1–0	Amman, Jordan	2000 WAFF Championship
281	07-Jun-00	Egypt	D	1–1	Tehran	2000 LG Cup
282	09-Jun-00	Macedonia	W	3–1	Tehran	2000 LG Cup
283	16-Aug-00	Georgia	W	2–1	Tehran	Friendly
284	01-Sep-00	Austria	L	1–5	Vienna, Austria	Friendly
285	27-Sep-00	Qatar	W	2–1	Doha, Qatar	Friendly
286	12-Oct-00	Lebanon	W	4–0	Beirut, Lebanon	2000 Asian Cup
287	15-Oct-00	Thailand	D	1–1	Beirut, Lebanon	2000 Asian Cup
288	18-Oct-00	Iraq	W	1–0	Sidon, Lebanon	2000 Asian Cup
289	23-Oct-00	South Korea	L	1–2	Tripoli, Lebanon	2000 Asian Cup
290	24-Nov-00	Guam	W	19–0	Tabriz	2002 World Cup Qualifier
291	28-Nov-00	Tajikistan	W	2–0	Tabriz	2002 World Cup Qualifier
292	19-Jan-01	China	W	4–0	Tehran	2001 Civilization Cup
293	24-Apr-01	South Korea	L	0–1	Cairo, Egypt	2001 LG Cup
294	26-Apr-01	Canada	L	0–1	Cairo, Egypt	2001 LG Cup
295	22-Jul-01	Bosnia and Herzegovina	D	2–2	Bihać, Bosnia and Herzegovina	Friendly
296	01-Aug-01	Qatar	L	1–2	Doha, Qatar	Friendly
297	08-Aug-01	Oman	W	5–2	Tehran	2001 LG Cup
298	10-Aug-01	Bosnia and Herzegovina	W	4–0	Tehran	2001 LG Cup
299	15-Aug-01	Slovakia	W	4–3	Bratislava, Slovakia	Friendly
300	24-Aug-01	Saudi Arabia	W	2–0	Tehran	2002 World Cup Qualifier
301	01-Sep-01	Thailand	D	0–0	Bangkok, Thailand	2002 World Cup Qualifier
302	07-Sep-01	Iraq	W	2–1	Baghdad, Iraq	2002 World Cup Qualifier
303	14-Sep-01	Bahrain	D	0–0	Tehran	2002 World Cup Qualifier
304	28-Sep-01	Saudi Arabia	D	2–2	Jeddah, Saudi Arabia	2002 World Cup Qualifier
305	05-Oct-01	Thailand	W	1–0	Tehran	2002 World Cup Qualifier
306	12-Oct-01	Iraq	W	2–1	Tehran	2002 World Cup Qualifier
307	21-Oct-01	Bahrain	L	1–3	Riffa, Bahrain	2002 World Cup Qualifier
308	25-Oct-01	United Arab Emirates	W	1–0	Tehran	2002 World Cup Qualifier
309	31-Oct-01	United Arab Emirates	W	3–0	Abu Dhabi, United Arab Emirates	2002 World Cup Qualifier
310	10-Nov-01	Republic of Ireland	L	0–2	Dublin, Republic of Ireland	2002 World Cup Qualifier
311	15-Nov-01	Republic of Ireland	W	1–0	Tehran	2002 World Cup Qualifier
312	06-Feb-02	Slovakia	L	2–3	Tehran	Friendly
313	01-Mar-02	Venezuela	W	1–0	Casablanca, Morocco	2002 LG Cup
314	30-May-02	Kuwait	W	3–1	Kuwait City, Kuwait	Friendly
315	10-Aug-02	Azerbaijan	D	1–1	Tabriz	Friendly
316	21-Aug-02	Ukraine	W	1–0	Kyiv, Ukraine	Friendly
317	30-Aug-02	Jordan	L	0–1	Damascus, Syria	2002 WAFF Championship
318	03-Sep-02	Lebanon	W	2–0	Damascus, Syria	2002 WAFF Championship
319	05-Sep-02	Iraq	D	0–0	Damascus, Syria	2002 WAFF Championship
320	07-Sep-02	Syria	D	2–2	Damascus, Syria	2002 WAFF Championship
321	19-Sep-02	Paraguay	D	1–1	Tabriz	2002 LG Cup
322	04-Feb-03	Uruguay	D	1–1	Hong Kong	2003 Lunar New Year Cup
323	13-Aug-03	Iraq	L	0–1	Tehran	2003 LG Cup
324	20-Aug-03	Belarus	L	1–2	Minsk, Belarus	Friendly
325	05-Sep-03	Jordan	W	4–1	Tehran	2004 Asian Cup Qualifier
326	26-Sep-03	Jordan	L	2–3	Amman, Jordan	2004 Asian Cup Qualifier
327	12-Oct-03	New Zealand	W	3–0	Tehran	2004 AFC–OFC Challenge Cup
328	27-Oct-03	North Korea	W	3–1	Pyongyang, North Korea	2004 Asian Cup Qualifier
329	12-Nov-03	North Korea	W	3–0	Tehran	2004 Asian Cup Qualifier
330	19-Nov-03	Lebanon	W	3–0	Beirut, Lebanon	2004 Asian Cup Qualifier
331	28-Nov-03	Lebanon	W	1–0	Tehran	2004 Asian Cup Qualifier
332	02-Dec-03	Kuwait	L	1–3	Kuwait City, Kuwait	Friendly
333	18-Feb-04	Qatar	W	3–1	Tehran	2006 World Cup Qualifier
334	31-Mar-04	Laos	W	7–0	Vientiane, Laos	2006 World Cup Qualifier
335	09-Jun-04	Jordan	L	0–1	Tehran	2006 World Cup Qualifier
336	17-Jun-04	Lebanon	W	4–0	Tehran	2004 WAFF Championship
337	21-Jun-04	Syria	W	7–1	Tehran	2004 WAFF Championship
338	23-Jun-04	Iraq	W	2–1	Tehran	2004 WAFF Championship
339	25-Jun-04	Syria	W	4–1	Tehran	2004 WAFF Championship
340	20-Jul-04	Thailand	W	3–0	Chongqing, China	2004 Asian Cup
341	24-Jul-04	Oman	D	2–2	Chongqing, China	2004 Asian Cup
342	28-Jul-04	Japan	D	0–0	Chongqing, China	2004 Asian Cup
343	31-Jul-04	South Korea	W	4–3	Jinan, China	2004 Asian Cup
344	03-Aug-04	China	D	1–1	Beijing, China	2004 Asian Cup
345	06-Aug-04	Bahrain	W	4–2	Beijing, China	2004 Asian Cup
346	08-Sep-04	Jordan	W	2–0	Amman, Jordan	2006 World Cup Qualifier
347	09-Oct-04	Germany	L	0–2	Tehran	Friendly
348	13-Oct-04	Qatar	W	3–2	Al-Rayyan, Qatar	2006 World Cup Qualifier
349	17-Nov-04	Laos	W	7–0	Tehran	2006 World Cup Qualifier
350	18-Dec-04	Panama	W	1–0	Tehran	Friendly
351	02-Feb-05	Bosnia and Herzegovina	W	2–1	Tehran	Friendly
352	09-Feb-05	Bahrain	D	0–0	Riffa, Bahrain	2006 World Cup Qualifier
353	25-Mar-05	Japan	W	2–1	Tehran	2006 World Cup Qualifier
354	30-Mar-05	North Korea	W	2–0	Pyongyang, North Korea	2006 World Cup Qualifier
355	29-May-05	Azerbaijan	W	2–1	Tehran	Friendly
356	03-Jun-05	North Korea	W	1–0	Tehran	2006 World Cup Qualifier
357	08-Jun-05	Bahrain	W	1–0	Tehran	2006 World Cup Qualifier
358	17-Aug-05	Japan	L	1–2	Yokohama, Japan	2006 World Cup Qualifier
359	24-Aug-05	Libya	W	4–0	Tehran	Friendly
360	12-Oct-05	South Korea	L	0–2	Seoul, South Korea	Friendly
361	13-Nov-05	Togo	W	2–0	Tehran	Tehran Tournament
362	22-Feb-06	Chinese Taipei	W	4–0	Tehran	2007 Asian Cup Qualifier
363	01-Mar-06	Costa Rica	W	3–2	Tehran	Friendly
364	28-May-06	Croatia	D	2–2	Osijek, Croatia	Friendly
365	31-May-06	Bosnia and Herzegovina	W	5–2	Tehran	Friendly
366	11-Jun-06	Mexico	L	1–3	Nuremberg, Germany	2006 World Cup
367	17-Jun-06	Portugal	L	0–2	Frankfurt, Germany	2006 World Cup
368	21-Jun-06	Angola	D	1–1	Leipzig, Germany	2006 World Cup
369	08-Aug-06	United Arab Emirates	W	1–0	Tehran	Friendly
370	16-Aug-06	Syria	D	1–1	Tehran	2007 Asian Cup Qualifier
371	02-Sep-06	South Korea	D	1–1	Seoul, South Korea	2007 Asian Cup Qualifier
372	06-Sep-06	Syria	W	2–0	Damascus, Syria	2007 Asian Cup Qualifier
373	04-Oct-06	Iraq	W	2–0	Amman, Jordan	Friendly
374	06-Oct-06	Jordan	D	0–0	Amman, Jordan	Friendly
375	11-Oct-06	Chinese Taipei	W	2–0	Taipei, Taiwan	2007 Asian Cup Qualifier
376	15-Nov-06	South Korea	W	2–0	Tehran	2007 Asian Cup Qualifier
377	12-Jan-07	United Arab Emirates	W	2–0	Abu Dhabi, United Arab Emirates	Friendly
378	07-Feb-07	Belarus	D	2–2	Tehran	Friendly
379	24-Mar-07	Qatar	W	1–0	Al-Rayyan, Qatar	Friendly
380	02-Jun-07	Mexico	L	0–4	San Luis Potosí, Mexico	Friendly
381	16-Jun-07	Iraq	D	0–0	Amman, Jordan	2007 WAFF Championship
382	20-Jun-07	Palestine	W	2–0	Amman, Jordan	2007 WAFF Championship
383	22-Jun-07	Jordan	W	1–0	Amman, Jordan	2007 WAFF Championship
384	24-Jun-07	Iraq	W	2–1	Amman, Jordan	2007 WAFF Championship
385	02-Jul-07	Jamaica	W	8–1	Tehran	Friendly
386	11-Jul-07	Uzbekistan	W	2–1	Kuala Lumpur, Malaysia	2007 Asian Cup
387	15-Jul-07	China	D	2–2	Kuala Lumpur, Malaysia	2007 Asian Cup
388	18-Jul-07	Malaysia	W	2–0	Kuala Lumpur, Malaysia	2007 Asian Cup
389	22-Jul-07	South Korea	D	0–0	Kuala Lumpur, Malaysia	2007 Asian Cup
390	10-Jan-08	Qatar	D	0–0	Doha, Qatar	Friendly
391	30-Jan-08	Costa Rica	D	0–0	Tehran	Friendly
392	06-Feb-08	Syria	D	0–0	Tehran	2010 World Cup Qualifier
393	21-Mar-08	Bahrain	L	0–1	Riffa, Bahrain	Friendly
394	26-Mar-08	Kuwait	D	2–2	Tehran	2010 World Cup Qualifier
395	25-May-08	Zambia	W	3–2	Tehran	Friendly
396	02-Jun-08	United Arab Emirates	D	0–0	Tehran	2010 World Cup Qualifier
397	07-Jun-08	United Arab Emirates	W	1–0	Al-Ain, United Arab Emirates	2010 World Cup Qualifier
398	14-Jun-08	Syria	W	2–0	Damascus, Syria	2010 World Cup Qualifier
399	22-Jun-08	Kuwait	W	2–0	Tehran	2010 World Cup Qualifier
400	07-Aug-08	Palestine	W	3–0	Tehran	2008 WAFF Championship
401	11-Aug-08	Qatar	W	6–1	Tehran	2008 WAFF Championship
402	13-Aug-08	Syria	W	2–0	Tehran	2008 WAFF Championship
403	15-Aug-08	Jordan	W	2–1	Tehran	2008 WAFF Championship
404	27-Aug-08	Azerbaijan	W	1–0	Tehran	Friendly
405	06-Sep-08	Saudi Arabia	D	1–1	Riyadh, Saudi Arabia	2010 World Cup Qualifier
406	15-Oct-08	North Korea	W	2–1	Tehran	2010 World Cup Qualifier
407	09-Nov-08	Qatar	W	1–0	Doha, Qatar	Friendly
408	19-Nov-08	United Arab Emirates	D	1–1	Abu Dhabi, United Arab Emirates	2010 World Cup Qualifier
409	16-Dec-08	Ecuador	L	0–1	Muscat, Oman	2008 Oman Cup
410	18-Dec-08	China	W	2–0	Muscat, Oman	2008 Oman Cup
411	09-Jan-09	China	W	3–1	Tehran	Friendly
412	14-Jan-09	Singapore	W	6–0	Tehran	2011 Asian Cup Qualifier
413	28-Jan-09	Thailand	D	0–0	Bangkok, Thailand	2011 Asian Cup Qualifier
414	11-Feb-09	South Korea	D	1–1	Tehran	2010 World Cup Qualifier
415	14-Mar-09	Kenya	W	1–0	Tehran	Friendly
416	28-Mar-09	Saudi Arabia	L	1–2	Tehran	2010 World Cup Qualifier
417	01-Apr-09	Senegal	D	1–1	Tehran	Friendly
418	01-Jun-09	China	L	0–1	Qinhuangdao, China	Friendly
419	06-Jun-09	North Korea	D	0–0	Pyongyang, North Korea	2010 World Cup Qualifier
420	10-Jun-09	United Arab Emirates	W	1–0	Tehran	2010 World Cup Qualifier
421	17-Jun-09	South Korea	D	1–1	Seoul, South Korea	2010 World Cup Qualifier
422	05-Jul-09	Botswana	D	1–1	Gaborone, Botswana	Friendly
423	12-Aug-09	Bosnia and Herzegovina	W	3–2	Sarajevo, Bosnia and Herzegovina	Friendly
424	31-Aug-09	Bahrain	L	2–4	Riffa, Bahrain	Friendly
425	05-Sep-09	Uzbekistan	D	0–0	Tashkent, Uzbekistan	Friendly
426	10-Nov-09	Iceland	W	1–0	Tehran	Friendly
427	14-Nov-09	Jordan	W	1–0	Tehran	2011 Asian Cup Qualifier
428	18-Nov-09	Macedonia	D	1–1	Tehran	Friendly
429	22-Nov-09	Jordan	L	0–1	Amman, Jordan	2011 Asian Cup Qualifier
430	28-Dec-09	Qatar	L	2–3	Doha, Qatar	2010 Qatar Friendship Cup
431	30-Dec-09	Mali	L	1–2	Doha, Qatar	2010 Qatar Friendship Cup

== 2010s ==
#	Date	Opponent	Result	Score	Venue	Competition
432	02-Jan-10	North Korea	W	1–0	Doha, Qatar	2010 Qatar Friendship Cup
433	06-Jan-10	Singapore	W	3–1	Singapore	2011 Asian Cup Qualifier
434	03-Mar-10	Thailand	W	1–0	Tehran	2011 Asian Cup Qualifier
435	11-Aug-10	Armenia	W	3–1	Yerevan, Armenia	Friendly
436	03-Sep-10	China	W	2–0	Zhengzhou, China	Friendly
437	07-Sep-10	South Korea	W	1–0	Seoul, South Korea	Friendly
438	24-Sep-10	Bahrain	W	3–0	Amman, Jordan	2010 WAFF Championship
439	28-Sep-10	Oman	D	2–2	Amman, Jordan	2010 WAFF Championship
440	01-Oct-10	Iraq	W	2–1	Amman, Jordan	2010 WAFF Championship
441	03-Oct-10	Kuwait	L	1–2	Amman, Jordan	2010 WAFF Championship
442	07-Oct-10	Brazil	L	0–3	Abu Dhabi, United Arab Emirates	Friendly
443	28-Dec-10	Qatar	D	0–0	Doha, Qatar	Friendly
444	02-Jan-11	Angola	W	1–0	Doha, Qatar	Friendly
445	11-Jan-11	Iraq	W	2–1	Doha, Qatar	2011 Asian Cup
446	15-Jan-11	North Korea	W	1–0	Doha, Qatar	2011 Asian Cup
447	19-Jan-11	United Arab Emirates	W	3–0	Doha, Qatar	2011 Asian Cup
448	22-Jan-11	South Korea	L	0–1	Doha, Qatar	2011 Asian Cup
449	09-Feb-11	Russia	W	1–0	Abu Dhabi, United Arab Emirates	Friendly
450	17-Jul-11	Madagascar	W	1–0	Tehran	Friendly
451	23-Jul-11	Maldives	W	4–0	Tehran	2014 World Cup Qualifier
452	28-Jul-11	Maldives	W	1–0	Malé, Maldives	2014 World Cup Qualifier
453	02-Sep-11	Indonesia	W	3–0	Tehran	2014 World Cup Qualifier
454	06-Sep-11	Qatar	D	1–1	Doha, Qatar	2014 World Cup Qualifier
455	05-Oct-11	Palestine	W	7–0	Tehran	Friendly
456	11-Oct-11	Bahrain	W	6–0	Tehran	2014 World Cup Qualifier
457	11-Nov-11	Bahrain	D	1–1	Riffa, Bahrain	2014 World Cup Qualifier
458	15-Nov-11	Indonesia	W	4–1	Jakarta, Indonesia	2014 World Cup Qualifier
459	23-Feb-12	Jordan	D	2–2	Dubai, United Arab Emirates	Friendly
460	29-Feb-12	Qatar	D	2–2	Tehran	2014 World Cup Qualifier
461	27-May-12	Albania	L	0–1	Istanbul, Turkey	Friendly
462	03-Jun-12	Uzbekistan	W	1–0	Tashkent, Uzbekistan	2014 World Cup Qualifier
463	12-Jun-12	Qatar	D	0–0	Tehran	2014 World Cup Qualifier
464	15-Aug-12	Tunisia	D	2–2	Kecskemét, Hungary	Friendly
465	05-Sep-12	Jordan	D	0–0	Amman, Jordan	Friendly
466	11-Sep-12	Lebanon	L	0–1	Beirut, Lebanon	2014 World Cup Qualifier
467	16-Oct-12	South Korea	W	1–0	Tehran	2014 World Cup Qualifier
468	06-Nov-12	Tajikistan	W	6–1	Tehran	Friendly
469	14-Nov-12	Uzbekistan	L	0–1	Tehran	2014 World Cup Qualifier
470	09-Dec-12	Saudi Arabia	D	0–0	Kuwait City, Kuwait	2012 WAFF Championship
471	12-Dec-12	Bahrain	D	0–0	Kuwait City, Kuwait	2012 WAFF Championship
472	15-Dec-12	Yemen	W	2–1	Kuwait City, Kuwait	2012 WAFF Championship
473	06-Feb-13	Lebanon	W	5–0	Tehran	2015 Asian Cup Qualifier
474	22-Mar-13	Kuwait	D	1–1	Kuwait City, Kuwait	2015 Asian Cup Qualifier
475	22-May-13	Oman	L	1–3	Muscat, Oman	Friendly
476	04-Jun-13	Qatar	W	1–0	Doha, Qatar	2014 World Cup Qualifier
477	11-Jun-13	Lebanon	W	4–0	Tehran	2014 World Cup Qualifier
478	18-Jun-13	South Korea	W	1–0	Ulsan, South Korea	2014 World Cup Qualifier
479	15-Oct-13	Thailand	W	2–1	Tehran	2015 Asian Cup Qualifier
480	15-Nov-13	Thailand	W	3–0	Bangkok, Thailand	2015 Asian Cup Qualifier
481	19-Nov-13	Lebanon	W	4–1	Beirut, Lebanon	2015 Asian Cup Qualifier
482	03-Mar-14	Kuwait	W	3–2	Karaj	2015 Asian Cup Qualifier
483	05-Mar-14	Guinea	L	1–2	Tehran	Friendly
484	18-May-14	Belarus	D	0–0	Kapfenberg, Austria	Friendly
485	26-May-14	Montenegro	D	0–0	Hartberg, Austria	Friendly
486	30-May-14	Angola	D	1–1	Hartberg, Austria	Friendly
487	08-Jun-14	Trinidad and Tobago	W	2–0	São Paulo, Brazil	Friendly
488	16-Jun-14	Nigeria	D	0–0	Curitiba, Brazil	2014 World Cup
489	21-Jun-14	Argentina	L	0–1	Belo Horizonte, Brazil	2014 World Cup
490	25-Jun-14	Bosnia and Herzegovina	L	1–3	Salvador, Brazil	2014 World Cup
491	18-Nov-14	South Korea	W	1–0	Tehran	Friendly
492	05-Jan-15	Iraq	W	1–0	Wollongong, Australia	Friendly
493	11-Jan-15	Bahrain	W	2–0	Melbourne, Australia	2015 Asian Cup
494	15-Jan-15	Qatar	W	1–0	Sydney, Australia	2015 Asian Cup
495	19-Jan-15	United Arab Emirates	W	1–0	Brisbane, Australia	2015 Asian Cup
496	23-Jan-15	Iraq	D	3–3	Canberra, Australia	2015 Asian Cup
497	26-Mar-15	Chile	W	2–0	Sankt Pölten, Austria	Friendly
498	31-Mar-15	Sweden	L	1–3	Solna, Sweden	Friendly
499	11-Jun-15	Uzbekistan	W	1–0	Tashkent, Uzbekistan	Friendly
500	16-Jun-15	Turkmenistan	D	1–1	Daşoguz, Turkmenistan	2018 World Cup Qualifier
501	03-Sep-15	Guam	W	6–0	Tehran	2018 World Cup Qualifier
502	08-Sep-15	India	W	3–0	Bangalore, India	2018 World Cup Qualifier
503	08-Oct-15	Oman	D	1–1	Muscat, Oman	2018 World Cup Qualifier
504	13-Oct-15	Japan	D	1–1	Tehran	Friendly
505	12-Nov-15	Turkmenistan	W	3–1	Tehran	2018 World Cup Qualifier
506	17-Nov-15	Guam	W	6–0	Dededo, Guam	2018 World Cup Qualifier
507	24-Mar-16	India	W	4–0	Tehran	2018 World Cup Qualifier
508	29-Mar-16	Oman	W	2–0	Tehran	2018 World Cup Qualifier
509	02-Jun-16	Macedonia	W	3–1	Skopje, Macedonia	Friendly
510	07-Jun-16	Kyrgyzstan	W	6–0	Tehran	Friendly
511	01-Sep-16	Qatar	W	2–0	Tehran	2018 World Cup Qualifier
512	06-Sep-16	China	D	0–0	Shenyang, China	2018 World Cup Qualifier
513	06-Oct-16	Uzbekistan	W	1–0	Tashkent, Uzbekistan	2018 World Cup Qualifier
514	11-Oct-16	South Korea	W	1–0	Tehran	2018 World Cup Qualifier
515	10-Nov-16	Papua New Guinea	W	8–1	Shah Alam, Malaysia	Friendly
516	15-Nov-16	Syria	D	0–0	Seremban, Malaysia	2018 World Cup Qualifier
517	18-Mar-17	Iraq	L	0–1	Tehran	Friendly
518	23-Mar-17	Qatar	W	1–0	Doha, Qatar	2018 World Cup Qualifier
519	28-Mar-17	China	W	1–0	Tehran	2018 World Cup Qualifier
520	04-Jun-17	Montenegro	W	2–1	Podgorica, Montenegro	Friendly
521	12-Jun-17	Uzbekistan	W	2–0	Tehran	2018 World Cup Qualifier
522	31-Aug-17	South Korea	D	0–0	Seoul, South Korea	2018 World Cup Qualifier
523	05-Sep-17	Syria	D	2–2	Tehran	2018 World Cup Qualifier
524	05-Oct-17	Togo	W	2–0	Tehran	Friendly
525	10-Oct-17	Russia	D	1–1	Kazan, Russia	Friendly
526	09-Nov-17	Panama	W	2–1	Graz, Austria	Friendly
527	13-Nov-17	Venezuela	W	1–0	Nijmegen, Netherlands	Friendly
528	17-Mar-18	Sierra Leone	W	4–0	Tehran	Friendly
529	23-Mar-18	Tunisia	L	0–1	Radès, Tunisia	Friendly
530	27-Mar-18	Algeria	W	2–1	Graz, Austria	Friendly
531	19-May-18	Uzbekistan	W	1–0	Tehran	Friendly
532	28-May-18	Turkey	L	1–2	Istanbul, Turkey	Friendly
533	08-Jun-18	Lithuania	W	1–0	Moscow, Russia	Friendly
534	15-Jun-18	Morocco	W	1–0	Saint Petersburg, Russia	2018 World Cup
535	20-Jun-18	Spain	L	0–1	Kazan, Russia	2018 World Cup
536	25-Jun-18	Portugal	D	1–1	Saransk, Russia	2018 World Cup
537	11-Sep-18	Uzbekistan	W	1–0	Tashkent, Uzbekistan	Friendly
538	16-Oct-18	Bolivia	W	2–1	Tehran	Friendly
539	15-Nov-18	Trinidad and Tobago	W	1–0	Tehran	Friendly
540	20-Nov-18	Venezuela	D	1–1	Doha, Qatar	Friendly
541	24-Dec-18	Palestine	D	1–1	Doha, Qatar	Friendly
542	31-Dec-18	Qatar	W	2–1	Doha, Qatar	Friendly
543	07-Jan-19	Yemen	W	5–0	Abu Dhabi, United Arab Emirates	2019 Asian Cup
544	12-Jan-19	Vietnam	W	2–0	Abu Dhabi, United Arab Emirates	2019 Asian Cup
545	16-Jan-19	Iraq	D	0–0	Dubai, United Arab Emirates	2019 Asian Cup
546	20-Jan-19	Oman	W	2–0	Abu Dhabi, United Arab Emirates	2019 Asian Cup
547	24-Jan-19	China	W	3–0	Abu Dhabi, United Arab Emirates	2019 Asian Cup
548	28-Jan-19	Japan	L	0–3	Al-Ain, United Arab Emirates	2019 Asian Cup
549	06-Jun-19	Syria	W	5–0	Tehran	Friendly
550	11-Jun-19	South Korea	D	1–1	Seoul, South Korea	Friendly
551	10-Sep-19	Hong Kong	W	2–0	Hong Kong	2022 World Cup Qualifier
552	10-Oct-19	Cambodia	W	14–0	Tehran	2022 World Cup Qualifier
553	15-Oct-19	Bahrain	L	0–1	Riffa, Bahrain	2022 World Cup Qualifier
554	14-Nov-19	Iraq	L	1–2	Amman, Jordan	2022 World Cup Qualifier

== 2020s ==
#	Date	Opponent	Result	Score	Venue	Competition
555	08-Oct-20	Uzbekistan	W	2–1	Tashkent, Uzbekistan	Friendly
556	12-Nov-20	Bosnia and Herzegovina	W	2–0	Sarajevo, Bosnia and Herzegovina	Friendly
557	30-Mar-21	Syria	W	3–0	Tehran	Friendly
558	03-Jun-21	Hong Kong	W	3–1	Arad, Bahrain	2022 World Cup Qualifier
559	07-Jun-21	Bahrain	W	3–0	Riffa, Bahrain	2022 World Cup Qualifier
560	11-Jun-21	Cambodia	W	10–0	Riffa, Bahrain	2022 World Cup Qualifier
561	15-Jun-21	Iraq	W	1–0	Arad, Bahrain	2022 World Cup Qualifier
562	02-Sep-21	Syria	W	1–0	Tehran	2022 World Cup Qualifier
563	07-Sep-21	Iraq	W	3–0	Doha, Qatar	2022 World Cup Qualifier
564	07-Oct-21	United Arab Emirates	W	1–0	Dubai, United Arab Emirates	2022 World Cup Qualifier
565	12-Oct-21	South Korea	D	1–1	Tehran	2022 World Cup Qualifier
566	11-Nov-21	Lebanon	W	2–1	Sidon, Lebanon	2022 World Cup Qualifier
567	16-Nov-21	Syria	W	3–0	Amman, Jordan	2022 World Cup Qualifier
568	27-Jan-22	Iraq	W	1–0	Tehran	2022 World Cup Qualifier
569	01-Feb-22	United Arab Emirates	W	1–0	Tehran	2022 World Cup Qualifier
570	24-Mar-22	South Korea	L	0–2	Seoul, South Korea	2022 World Cup Qualifier
571	29-Mar-22	Lebanon	W	2–0	Mashhad	2022 World Cup Qualifier
572	12-Jun-22	Algeria	L	1–2	Doha, Qatar	Friendly
573	23-Sep-22	Uruguay	W	1–0	Sankt Pölten, Austria	Friendly
574	27-Sep-22	Senegal	D	1–1	Maria Enzersdorf, Austria	Friendly
575	10-Nov-22	Nicaragua	W	1–0	Tehran	Friendly
576	21-Nov-22	England	L	2–6	Al-Rayyan, Qatar	2022 World Cup
577	25-Nov-22	Wales	W	2–0	Al-Rayyan, Qatar	2022 World Cup
578	29-Nov-22	United States	L	0–1	Doha, Qatar	2022 World Cup
579	23-Mar-23	Russia	D	1–1	Tehran	Friendly
580	28-Mar-23	Kenya	W	2–1	Tehran	Friendly
581	13-Jun-23	Afghanistan	W	6–1	Bishkek, Kyrgyzstan	2023 CAFA Nations Cup
582	16-Jun-23	Kyrgyzstan	W	5–1	Bishkek, Kyrgyzstan	2023 CAFA Nations Cup
583	20-Jun-23	Uzbekistan	W	1–0	Tashkent, Uzbekistan	2023 CAFA Nations Cup
584	07-Sep-23	Bulgaria	W	1–0	Plovdiv, Bulgaria	Friendly
585	12-Sep-23	Angola	W	4–0	Tehran	Friendly
586	13-Oct-23	Jordan	W	3–1	Amman, Jordan	2023 Jordan Tournament
587	17-Oct-23	Qatar	W	4–0	Amman, Jordan	2023 Jordan Tournament
588	16-Nov-23	Hong Kong	W	4–0	Tehran	2026 World Cup Qualifier
589	21-Nov-23	Uzbekistan	D	2–2	Tashkent, Uzbekistan	2026 World Cup Qualifier
590	05-Jan-24	Burkina Faso	W	2–1	Kish	Friendly
591	09-Jan-24	Indonesia	W	5–0	Al-Rayyan, Qatar	Friendly
592	14-Jan-24	Palestine	W	4–1	Al-Rayyan, Qatar	2023 Asian Cup
593	19-Jan-24	Hong Kong	W	1–0	Al-Rayyan, Qatar	2023 Asian Cup
594	23-Jan-24	United Arab Emirates	W	2–1	Al-Rayyan, Qatar	2023 Asian Cup
595	31-Jan-24	Syria	D	1–1	Doha, Qatar	2023 Asian Cup
596	03-Feb-24	Japan	W	2–1	Al-Rayyan, Qatar	2023 Asian Cup
597	07-Feb-24	Qatar	L	2–3	Doha, Qatar	2023 Asian Cup
598	21-Mar-24	Turkmenistan	W	5–0	Tehran	2026 World Cup Qualifier
599	26-Mar-24	Turkmenistan	W	1–0	Ashgabat, Turkmenistan	2026 World Cup Qualifier
600	06-Jun-24	Hong Kong	W	4–2	Hong Kong	2026 World Cup Qualifier
601	11-Jun-24	Uzbekistan	D	0–0	Tehran	2026 World Cup Qualifier
602	05-Sep-24	Kyrgyzstan	W	1–0	Fooladshahr	2026 World Cup Qualifier
603	10-Sep-24	United Arab Emirates	W	1–0	Al-Ain, United Arab Emirates	2026 World Cup Qualifier
604	10-Oct-24	Uzbekistan	D	0–0	Tashkent, Uzbekistan	2026 World Cup Qualifier
605	15-Oct-24	Qatar	W	4–1	Dubai, United Arab Emirates	2026 World Cup Qualifier
606	14-Nov-24	North Korea	W	3–2	Vientiane, Laos	2026 World Cup Qualifier
607	19-Nov-24	Kyrgyzstan	W	3–2	Bishkek, Kyrgyzstan	2026 World Cup Qualifier
608	20-Mar-25	United Arab Emirates	W	2–0	Tehran	2026 World Cup Qualifier
609	25-Mar-25	Uzbekistan	D	2–2	Tehran	2026 World Cup Qualifier
610	05-Jun-25	Qatar	L	0–1	Doha, Qatar	2026 World Cup Qualifier
611	10-Jun-25	North Korea	W	3–0	Tehran	2026 World Cup Qualifier
612	29-Aug-25	Afghanistan	W	3–1	Hisar, Tajikistan	2025 CAFA Nations Cup
613	01-Sep-25	India	W	3–0	Hisar, Tajikistan	2025 CAFA Nations Cup
614	04-Sep-25	Tajikistan	D	2–2	Hisar, Tajikistan	2025 CAFA Nations Cup
615	08-Sep-25	Uzbekistan	L	0–1	Tashkent, Uzbekistan	2025 CAFA Nations Cup
616	10-Oct-25	Russia	L	1–2	Volgograd, Russia	Friendly
617	14-Oct-25	Tanzania	W	2–0	Dubai, United Arab Emirates	Friendly
618	13-Nov-25	Cape Verde	D	0–0	Al-Ain, United Arab Emirates	2025 Al-Ain Cup
619	18-Nov-25	Uzbekistan	D	0–0	Al-Ain, United Arab Emirates	2025 Al-Ain Cup
620	27-Mar-26	Nigeria	L	1–2	Antalya, Turkey	2026 Jordan Tournament
621	31-Mar-26	Costa Rica	W	5–0	Antalya, Turkey	2026 Jordan Tournament
622	29-May-26	Gambia	W	3–1	Antalya, Turkey	Friendly
623	04-Jun-26	Mali	W	2–0	Antalya, Turkey	Friendly
624	15-Jun-26	New Zealand	D	2–2	Inglewood, United States	2026 World Cup
625	21-Jun-26	Belgium	D	0–0	Inglewood, United States	2026 World Cup
626	26-Jun-26	Egypt	D	1–1	Seattle, United States	2026 World Cup
627	24-Sep-26	Uzbekistan	L	1–3	Fergana, Uzbekistan	Friendly
628	29-Sep-26	Russia	L	0–2	Kazan, Russian	Friendly
629	14-Nov-26	Palestine	W	2–0	Basra, Iraq	2026 Basra Tournament
630	17-Nov-26	Iraq	D	1–1	Basra, Iraq	2026 Basra Tournament

== See also ==
- Iran national football team head-to-head record
- Iran national football team Unofficial matches
