= 2001 LG Cup =

2001 LG Cup may refer to:

- 2001 LG Cup (Egypt), an exhibition association football tournament, 24–26 April in Cairo
- 2001 LG Cup (Iran), an exhibition association football tournament, 8–10 August in Tehran
- 2001 LG Cup (snooker), the World Open, 12–21 October in Preston, England
