= 1998 Lunar New Year Cup =

Tournament details
- Host country: Hong Kong
- Dates: 11–14 February
- Teams: 4
- Venue: 1 (in 1 host city)

Final positions
- Champions: Nigeria (1st title)

Tournament statistics
- Matches played: 4
- Goals scored: 9 (2.25 per match)
- Top scorer: (Hong Kong) Paul Foster (3 goals)

The 1998 Lunar New Year Cup (a.k.a. Carlsberg Cup) was a football tournament held in Hong Kong over the first and fourth day of the Chinese New Year holiday (11 February and 14 February 1998).

== Participating teams ==
- Chile
- Hong Kong League XI (host)
- Iran
- Nigeria

== Results ==
All times given in Hong Kong Time (UTC+8).

=== Semifinals ===
11 February 1998

Nigeria	1–0	Iran
Ahmed Garba 50'

Hong Kong Stadium, Hong Kong

11 February 1998

Hong Kong League XI	3–1	Chile
Foster 13', 34', 89'		Barrera 5'

Hong Kong Stadium, Hong Kong

=== Third place match ===
14 February 1998

Iran	1–1	Chile
Mahdavikia 21'	Report	Neira 6'
Penalties
Khakpour (penalty scored); Mahdavikia (penalty scored); Falahatzadeh (penalty scored); Pashazadeh (penalty missed); Abedzadeh (penalty scored)	4–2	(penalty scored) Parraguez; (penalty scored) Barrera; (penalty missed) Sierra; (penalty missed) Olarra

Hong Kong Stadium, Hong Kong
Attendance: 31,000
Referee: Peter Mikkelsen (Denmark)

=== Final ===
14 February 1998
20:15

Nigeria	2–0	Hong Kong League XI
Siasia 61'; Pascal 87'

Hong Kong Stadium, Hong Kong

== Bracket ==
Semi-finals
11 February 1998 – Hong Kong
Nigeria	1
Iran	0
11 February 1998 – Hong Kong
Hong Kong League XI	3
Chile	1

Final
14 February 1998 – Hong Kong
Nigeria	2
Hong Kong League XI	0
Third place
14 February 1998 – Hong Kong
Iran (pen.)	1 (5)
Chile	1 (3)

1998 Carlsberg Cup Winner
Nigeria
First Title

== Top scorers ==
3 goals

- (Hong Kong) Paul Foster

1 goal

- (Chile) Manuel Neira
- (Chile) Rodrigo Barrera
- (Iran) Mehdi Mahdavikia
- (Nigeria) Samson Siasia
- (Nigeria) Patrick Pascal
- (Nigeria) Ahmed Garba

== See also ==
- Hong Kong Football Association
- Hong Kong First Division League
