= Hüseyin Eroğlu =

Turkish-German football coach and former player

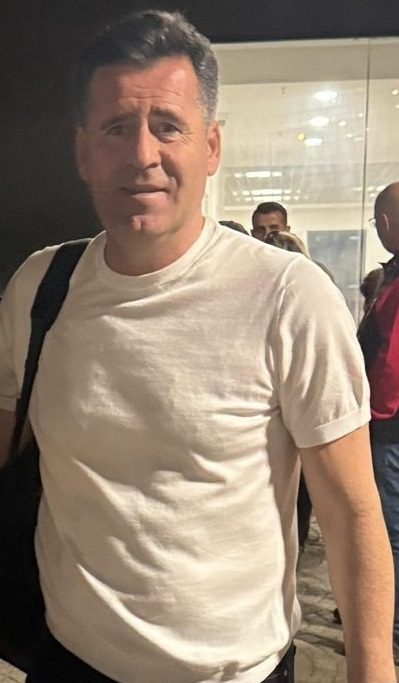

Personal information
- Date of birth: 2 November 1972 (age 53)
- Place of birth: Delmenhorst, Germany
- Height: 1.79 m (5 ft 10 in)
- Position: Midfielder

Youth career
- 1984–1994: Çamdibigücü

Senior career*
Years	Team	Apps	(Gls)
1994–1995	Soma Sotesspor	25	(7)
1995–1998	TKİ Soma Linyitspor	85	(11)
1998–2000	Marmaris Belediye	61	(4)
2000–2002	Akhisarspor	55	(8)
2002–2004	Eskişehirspor	53	(4)
2004–2005	Akhisarspor	29	(0)

Managerial career
- 2012–2022: Altınordu
- 2022–2023: Samsunspor
- 2023–2024: Bandırmaspor
- 2024–2025: Gençlerbirliği
- 2025–2026: Çorum
- * Club domestic league appearances and goals

Hüseyin Eroğlu (born 2 November 1972) is a Turkish-German football manager and former player.

== Professional career ==
Eroğlu was born in Germany to Turkish parents, moving to Turkey at a young age where he was a part of Çamdibigücü's youth academy. He began his senior career with Soma Sotesspor in 1994, and shortly after moved to TKİ Soma Linyitspor. After 3 seasons with them, he moved to Marmaris Belediye in 2000, and then to Akhisarspor. In 2002, he moved to Eskişehirspor, before returning to Akhisarspor for his final season in 2004. Playing entirely in Turkey's semi-professional leagues, he finished his career with 34 goals in 308 games.

== Managerial career ==
Eroğlu graduated from the Ege University in 1999 and starting coaching at Bucaspor's youth academy after his playing career. He became Bucaspor's assistant coach from 2010 to 2012. In the summer of 2012, he was appointed as the manager for Altınordu. He helped Altınordu win the 2012–13 TFF Third League, and the 2013–14 TFF Second League consecutively, earning them promotion to the TFF First League. He stayed a decade with Altınordu, finishing with 163 wins in 359 matches until 17 May 2022. On 26 September 2022, he was appointed as the manager of Samsunspor in the TFF First League. He helped them win the 2022–23 TFF First League, and earned promotion to the Süper Lig.

== Managerial statistics ==
As of match played 26 October 2025

Team	Nat	From	To	Record							
Team	Nat	From	To	G	W	D	L	GF	GA	GD	Win %
Altınordu	(Turkey)	7 September 2012	17 May 2022	368	168	89	111	584	448	+136	45.65
Samsunspor	(Turkey)	25 September 2022	27 September 2023	36	21	7	8	66	33	+33	58.33
Bandırmaspor	(Turkey)	26 December 2023	16 March 2024	12	4	3	5	17	13	+4	33.33
Gençlerbirliği	(Turkey)	25 December 2024	28 October 2025	31	15	8	8	50	30	+20	48.39
Total				447	208	107	132	717	524	+193	46.53

== Honours ==
Altınordu

- TFF Third League: 2012–13
- TFF Second League: 2013–14

Samsunspor

- TFF First League: 2022–23
