= Tolga Doğantez =

Turkish footballer (born 1975)

Personal information
- Date of birth: 22 February 1975
- Place of birth: İzmir, Turkey
- Height: 1.82 m (6 ft 0 in)
- Position: Centre-back

Senior career*
| Years | Team | Apps | (Gls) |
| 1993–1995 | Turgutluspor | 20 | (0) |
| 1995–1996 | Yeni Bornovaspor | 36 | (1) |
| 1996–1997 | Göztepe | 30 | (0) |
| 1997–1998 | Adıyamanspor | 17 | (1) |
| 1997–2002 | Gençlerbirliği | 20 | (1) |
| 2002–2003 | Beşiktaş | 17 | (0) |
| 2003–2004 | İstanbulspor | 9 | (0) |
| 2004 | MKE Ankaragücü | 11 | (0) |
| 2004–2005 | Ankaraspor | 3 | (0) |
| 2005 | Samsunspor | 7 | (0) |
| 2005 | MKE Ankaragücü | 1 | (0) |
| 2005–2006 | Diyarbakırspor | 7 | (0) |
| 2006 | Samsunspor | 16 | (0) |
| 2006 | Sivasspor | 1 | (0) |
| 2006–2007 | Çaykur Rizespor | 12 | (0) |
| 2007–2008 | Gençlerbirliği | 13 | (0) |
| 2008–2009 | MKE Ankaragücü | 12 | (0) |
| 2009 | Manisaspor | 6 | (0) |
| 2009–2010 | Diyarbakırspor | 14 | (0) |
| 2010 | Boluspor | 13 | (0) |
| 2010–2011 | Karşıyaka | 19 | (0) |
| 2011–2012 | Turgutluspor | 9 | (0) |

International career
| 2001 | Turkey | 2 | (0) |
- * Club domestic league appearances and goals

Tolga Doğantez (born 22 February 1975) is a Turkish football coach and former player. A centre-back, Doğantez played three times for the Turkey national team and twice for Turkey B national football team. At club level, he played for Turgutluspor, Adıyamanspor, Gençlerbirliği, Beşiktaş, İstanbulspor, Ankaraspor, Samsunspor, Sivasspor, Çaykur Rizespor and Karşıyaka S.K.

== Honours ==
Gençlerbirliği

- Turkish Cup: 2001

Beşiktaş

- Süper Lig: 2002–03
