= Ahmed Garba =

Nigerian footballer and manager (born 1980)

Yaro Yaro
Personal information
- Date of birth: 24 May 1980 (age 46)
- Place of birth: Kano, Nigeria
- Height: 1.74 m (5 ft 9 in)
- Position: Striker

Senior career*
Years	Team	Apps	(Gls)
1997–2001	Kano Pillars		
2001–2002	Club Africain		
2002	Kano Pillars		
2003	Enyimba International		
2004–2007	Akademisk Boldklub	77	(25)
2007–2011	Kano Pillars		
2012–2015	Wikki Tourists		

International career
1998–2003	Nigeria	6	(1)
- * Club domestic league appearances and goals

Ahmed Garba (born 24 May 1980), commonly known as Yaro Yaro, is a Nigerian football manager and former player, who played as a striker.

== Career ==
Garba was a member of the Nigeria national team at the 1998 Carlsberg Cup.

In 1997, he was reportedly offered a four-year contract by a Borussia Dortmund II. However, the Nigerian Football Association did not allow the transfer from Kano Pillars to go through.

In 2012, Garba joined Nigerian Premier League club Wikki Tourists F.C.

In July 2015, he was made interim manager of Kano Pillars.

== Honours ==
Nigeria

- Carlsberg Cup: 1998
