= İsmail Güldüren =

Turkish footballer and manager

Personal information
- Full name: İsmail Güldüren
- Date of birth: 10 January 1979 (age 47)
- Place of birth: İnegöl, Turkey
- Height: 1.83 m (6 ft 0 in)
- Positions: Centre back; left back

Youth career
- 1995–1996: İnegölspor

Senior career*
Years	Team	Apps	(Gls)
1996–2002	Gençlerbirliği	115	(4)
2002–2004	Fenerbahçe	2	(0)
2004–2005	Ankaraspor	16	(0)
2005–2006	Gençlerbirliği	45	(1)
2006–2008	Bursaspor	56	(2)
2008–2009	Konyaspor	29	(1)
2009–2010	Giresunspor	12	(0)

International career
1994–1995	Turkey U16	20	
1995–1997	Turkey U17	9	
1996–1997	Turkey U18	23	
1998–2001	Turkey U21	32	

Managerial career
- 2015–2016: İnegölspor (U15)
- 2016: İnegölspor (assistant)
- 2016–2017: İnegölspor
- 2018–2019: İnegölspor (assistant)
- 2019: İnegölspor
- * Club domestic league appearances and goals

İsmail Güldüren (born January 1, 1979, in İnegöl, Bursa Province) is a Turkish football manager and former player who was most recently manager of İnegölspor.

== Career ==
Güldüren currently plays for Giresunspor as a secondary captain next to Emrah Eren. He previously played for Gençlerbirliği, Ankaraspor, Fenerbahçe, Bursaspor and Konyaspor. He plays left back and full back. Standing at 183 cm, he wears the number 3 jersey.

Perhaps he doesnt play anylong. It has been 17 years

== Honours ==
- Gençlerbirliği
  - Turkish Cup (1): 2001
- Fenerbahçe
  - Süper Lig (1): 2003–04
