= İlhan Cavcav =

Turkish businessman (1935–2017)

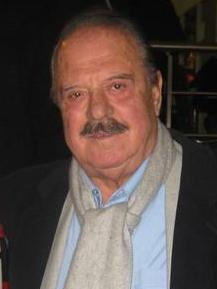
- Cavcav, 2012

Chairman of Gençlerbirliği S.K.
- In office 1978 – 22 January 2017
- Preceded by: Hasan Şengel
- Succeeded by: Murat Cavcav

Personal details
- Born: 4 October 1935 Ankara, Turkey
- Died: 22 January 2017 (aged 81) Ankara, Turkey
- Resting place: Cebeci Asri Cemetery
- Spouse: Nazan Cavcav (1962–2017)
- Children: 3
- Relatives: Tayyar Cavcav (uncle); Muzaffer Cavcav Cin (big sister); Perrin Cavcav Sezerse (sister); Burhan Cavcav (brother); İhsan Cavcav (brother); Murat Cavcav (son); Erdal Beşikçioğlu (nephew)
- Occupation: Footballer; Businessman; Football administrator
Association football career
- Position: Centre-back
Youth career
- 1951–1954: Mamak Maskespor
Senior career*
Years	Team	Apps	(Gls)
1954	PTT		
1954	Bahçeli Gençlik Spor		
- * Club domestic league appearances and goals

İlhan Cavcav (4 October 1935 – 22 January 2017) was the chairman of Turkish club Gençlerbirliği in Ankara, Turkey for almost 40 years until his death. He was known for his hard negotiation tactics with the big clubs in Turkey and scouting abilities especially for discovering talent from Africa.

== Personal life ==
Cavcav was born to a Kosovo Albanian family originally from Pristina. His father Haşim had 2 wives and 17 children. He owned a flour mill in Mamak and a small bakery shop. Cavcav left school at the age of 14 in order to help support the family and started to work with his father as a cashier in the mill. In 1960, he formed his own business and in 1969 he opened his own more modern flour mill in Ankara (Ankara Un Sanayii). On September 19, 1976, Cavcav was on route to Antalya aboard a Boeing 727, but Cavcav changed his plans, deboarded in Istanbul, and flew to Ankara instead. During the leg from Istanbul to Antalya, the aircraft crashed into a mountain killing all 154 passengers and crew on board.

== Early years playing football ==
At 16, he started to play football with a local team Mamak Maskespor. When he was 19, he was transferred to another Ankara team PTT. Cavcav has stated that PTT expected him to play professionally and he was unable due to his work at the flour mill with his father. Still 19, he briefly joined another local team Bahçeli Gençlik Spor before ending this period. It was to be years later that he returned to football as a Chairman.

== Career as Chairman ==
His first trial as a chairman was with the local Ankara team Hacettepe Kulübü in 1976. After Hacettepe relegated in the same season, he resigned from his position. In 1977, he served under Hasan Şengel as a board member in his current club Gençlerbirliği. In 1978's election, he became the Chairman for Gençlerbirliği when the team was in Turkish Second League. Gençlerbirliği relegated to Third League in 1979. The Turkish Football federation merged the second and third Leagues in 1980. This was an automatic promotion to second league. In 1983, Cavcav's Gençlerbirliği promoted to Turkish First League. Gençlerbirliği played in 1st League except 1988–89 season, when played in 2nd league.

In recent years, Gençlerbirliği fans have been highly critical of Cavcav stating that the club turned into a company seeking for the maximum profit and ignoring the target of success in the Turkish League and in European competitions. Fans are not happy with the situation about the instability of the squad because Cavcav never rejects the transfer offers coming from the big teams in Turkey for the best players of the team.

On the other hand, anti-democratic attitudes in the elections of club management also are used as a means of criticizing Cavcav. Allegations were; in last club elections, nearly 1200 new members were added to the club who were not even Genclerbirligi fan. Opposition group went to court However, the Turkish court did not approve the case.

In November 2014, Cavcav announced that he would be fining bearded players, claiming that they were a bad influence for the youth. Cavcav said that he would fine players that kept their beards 25,000 Turkish Liras and also attacked UEFA for not banning beards in all of its completions.

== Death ==
Cavcav was taken to hospital after falling and hitting his head, which caused a brain hemorrhage. He was kept in intensive care unit. One day later, on 22 January 2017, he was pronounced dead. On 23 January, he was buried at Cebeci Asri Cemetery in Ankara.

== Achievements ==
- In 1978, Gençlerbirliği S.K. had no training facilities and now the team has one of the largest youth programs in Turkey and 50 acres (200,000 m^{2}) of training facilities in Bestepe, Ankara (Beştepe İlhan Cavcav Tesisleri)
- He is the longest serving professional football club chairman in Turkey (1978–2017).
