= Tomasz Zdebel =

Polish-German footballer

Personal information
- Date of birth: 25 May 1973 (age 53)
- Place of birth: Katowice, Poland
- Height: 1.78 m (5 ft 10 in)
- Position: Defensive midfielder

Youth career
- –1988: GKS Katowice
- 1988–1990: Fortuna Düsseldorf

Senior career*
Years	Team	Apps	(Gls)
1990–1992	Rot-Weiss Essen	30	(4)
1992–1994	1. FC Köln II	47	(3)
1993–1997	1. FC Köln	57	(2)
1997–2000	Lierse	78	(9)
2000–2003	Gençlerbirliği	80	(12)
2003–2008	VfL Bochum	162	(8)
2009–2010	Bayer Leverkusen	12	(0)
2009	Bayer Leverkusen II	1	(0)
2010–2011	Alemannia Aachen	6	(0)
Total		473	(37)

International career
2000–2003	Poland	14	(0)

Managerial career
- 2015–2017: SV Bergisch Gladbach 09
- 2018–2019: TV Herkenrath 09
- 2019–2022: Bayer Leverkusen U17
- * Club domestic league appearances and goals

Tomasz Zdebel (born 25 May 1973) is a Polish-German former professional footballer who played as a defensive midfielder. He was active in his active career in Germany, Belgium and Turkey. From 2000 to 2003, he played for the Poland national team.

== Early life ==
Zdebel was born and raised in Katowice, Poland. His father was a football player who worked as a miner during the week. In 1988 the family emigrated to Düsseldorf.

== Playing career ==
Zdebel started playing football with the local club GKS Katowice. Having emigrated to Germany, he joined the youth team of Fortuna Düsseldorf. He started his senior career in 1990, the year he received German citizenship, at Rot-Weiss Essen. One year later the team was relegated from the Bundesliga. In 1992 Zdebel joined 1. FC Köln and played for their reserve team. In 1993, he debuted for the first team.

He left Cologne in 1997 and moved to Lierse. In his first season the club finished seventh and qualified for the 1997–98 UEFA Champions League. The next season Lierse won the Belgian Cup. Zdebel played as central midfielder and as a defender for Lierse.

In 2000, Zdebel moved to Turkey and signed with Gençlerbirliği S.K. In 2003, he returned to Germany and joined VfL Bochum.

== Coaching career ==
Zdebel runs a football school called Spofa-Fußballschule, alongside former footballer Andrzej Rudy.

In 2012, Zdebel began working as a youth coordinator for SV Bergisch Gladbach 09. After first team manager Dietmar Schacht was fired on 18 March 2015, Zdebel took over his position. On 2 October 2017, Zdebel resigned from his position.

On 4 November 2018, Zdebel was appointed as the manager of TV Herkenrath 09. After only eight weeks, on 4 January 2019, Zdebel resigned after a massive chaos, with several players leaving the club.

== Career statistics ==
Appearances and goals by club, season and competition
Club	Season	League			National cup		League cup		Continental		Total	
Club	Season	Division	Apps	Goals	Apps	Goals	Apps	Goals	Apps	Goals	Apps	Goals
Rot-Weiss Essen	1990–91	2. Bundesliga	1	0	0	0	—		—		1	0
Rot-Weiss Essen	1991–92	Oberliga Nordrhein	29	4	1	0	—		—		30	4
Rot-Weiss Essen	Total		30	4	1	0	0	0	0	0	31	4
1. FC Köln II	1992–93	Oberliga Nordrhein	23	0	—		—		—		23	0
1. FC Köln II	1993–94	Oberliga Nordrhein	24	3	—		—		—		24	3
1. FC Köln II	Total		47	3	0	0	0	0	0	0	47	3
1. FC Köln	1993–94	Bundesliga	1	0	0	0	—		—		1	0
1. FC Köln	1994–95	Bundesliga	13	1	2	0	—		—		15	1
1. FC Köln	1995–96	Bundesliga	23	0	1	0	—		—		24	0
1. FC Köln	1996–97	Bundesliga	20	1	1	0	—		—		21	1
1. FC Köln	Total		57	2	4	0	0	0	0	0	61	2
Lierse	1997–98	First Division	30	4			—		6	0		
Lierse	1998–99	First Division	28	3			—		—			
Lierse	1999–00	First Division	20	2			—		—			
Lierse	Total		78	9			0	0	6	0		
Gençlerbirliği	2000–01	1. Lig	30	3	4	1	—		—		34	4
Gençlerbirliği	2001–02	Süper Lig	22	3	0	0	—		2	0	24	3
Gençlerbirliği	2002–03	Süper Lig	28	6	5	0	—		—		33	6
Gençlerbirliği	Total		80	12	9	1	0	0	2	0	91	13
VfL Bochum	2003–04	Bundesliga	34	1	1	0	1	0	—		36	1
VfL Bochum	2004–05	Bundesliga	28	1	1	0	1	0	2	0	32	1
VfL Bochum	2005–06	2. Bundesliga	30	2	2	0	—		—		32	2
VfL Bochum	2006–07	Bundesliga	32	1	2	0	—		—		34	1
VfL Bochum	2007–08	Bundesliga	26	1	1	0	—		—		27	1
VfL Bochum	2008–09	Bundesliga	12	1	2	0	—		—		14	1
VfL Bochum	Total		162	7	9	0	2	0	2	0	175	7
Bayer Leverkusen	2008–09	Bundesliga	4	0	0	0	—		—		4	0
Bayer Leverkusen	2009–10	Bundesliga	8	0	1	0	—		—		9	0
Bayer Leverkusen	Total		12	0	1	0	0	0	0	0	13	0
Bayer Leverkusen II	2009–10	Regionalliga West	1	0	—		—		—		1	0
Alemannia Aachen	2010–11	2. Bundesliga	6	0	1	0	—		—		7	0
Career total			473	37			2	0	10	0		

== Honours ==
Lierse

- Belgian Cup: 1998–99
- Belgian Super Cup: 1997, 1999

Gençlerbirliği

- Turkish Cup: 2000–01
