= Andre Kona N'Gole =

Congolese footballer

Andre Kona
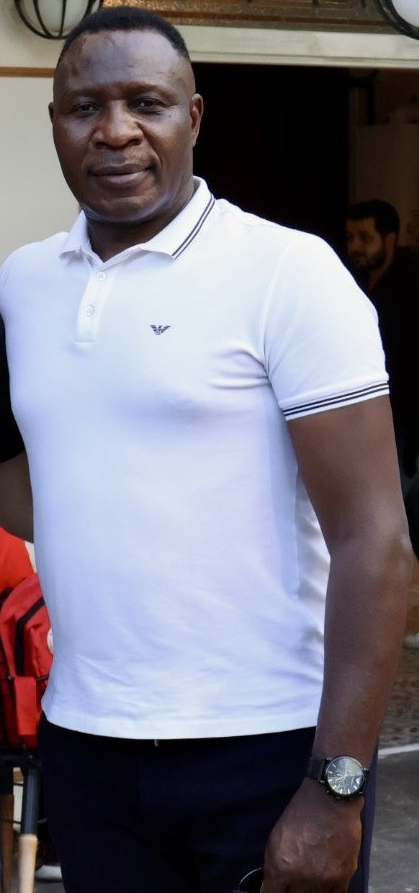

Personal information
- Full name: Andre Kona N'Gole
- Date of birth: 16 June 1970 (age 56)
- Place of birth: Lubumbashi, Zaire (now DR Congo)
- Position: Striker

Senior career*
Years	Team	Apps	(Gls)
1991–1992	FC Lubumbashi		
- SM Bibiche
- Jomo Cosmos
1993–1996	Gençlerbirliği	84	(41)
1996–1999	Antalyaspor	72	(21)
1999–2001	Gençlerbirliği	51	(27)
2001–2002	Diyarbakırspor	33	(9)
2002–2003	Istanbulspor	20	(2)

International career
1991–1996	Zaire		
- * Club domestic league appearances and goals

Andre Kona N'Gole (born 16 June 1970) is a Congolese football player. He started playing for Jomo Cosmos in South Africa where he was discovered by FIFA agent Marcelo Houseman who made his transfer to play striker for Gençlerbirliği in the Turkish Super League, for 5 seasons.

By scoring 74 goals including 12 penalties for Gençlerbirliği, he became the all-time top scorer of the club, a record that had previously stood since 1958. Between 1993 (23 August 1993) and 2001 (26 May 2001), he played 147 matches totalling 12,458 minutes for the club.

He has scored a total of 97 goals in 265 games in the Turkish Super League.

Has duel Turkish citizenship, having gained naturalisation during his career in Turkey.

Kona N'Gole played for the Zaire national football team at the 1992 and 1996 African Cup of Nations finals.

== Honours ==
- Gençlerbirliği
  - Turkish Cup (1): 2001
