= Paul Foster (soccer) =

Australian former football player

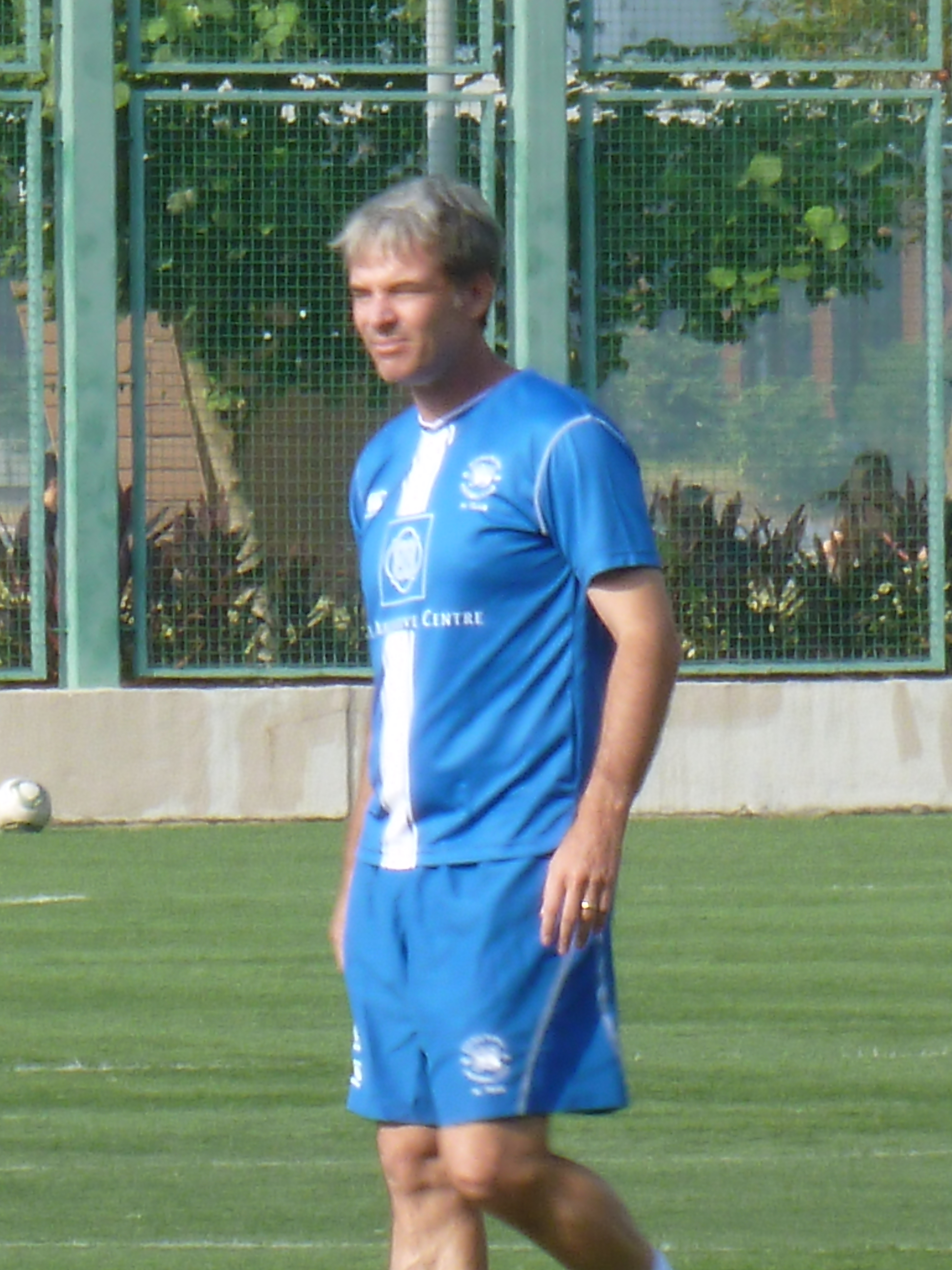

Personal information
- Full name: Paul Anthony Foster
- Date of birth: 28 December 1967 (age 58)
- Place of birth: Lismore, New South Wales, Australia
- Height: 1.80 m (5 ft 11 in)
- Position: Striker

Youth career
- 1986–1987: AIS

Senior career*
| Years | Team | Apps | (Gls) |
| 1988–1989 | South Melbourne | 26 | (1) |
| 1989–1991 | Sunshine George Cross | 24 | (2) |
| 1992 | Avala | 12 | (4) |
| 1992–1993 | Parramatta Eagles | 23 | (4) |
| 1994–1995 | Kitchee | 16 | (8) |
| 1995–1998 | Instant Dict | | (66) |
| 1998–1999 | Northern Spirit FC | 4 | (0) |
| 1999–2002 | Brisbane Strikers | 69 | (35) |

Managerial career
- 2008–2011: Australia U-21
- 2010–2011: Hong Kong Football Club
- 2011–2012: Hong Kong Sapling
- 2013: Happy Valley
- 2013: Kitchee SC(Chief technology officer)
- 2022–: Goonellabah FC
- * Club domestic league appearances and goals

Paul Foster (born 28 December 1967) is an Australian former soccer player who played at the national league level in Australia and Hong Kong.

== Playing career ==
Foster played youth football for Goonellabah Hornets in Lismore alongside his brothers Craig and Stephen. Craig later played at international level for Australia.

Foster signed with South Melbourne FC in the National Soccer League (NSL) in late 1987. He made his debut for the club in 1988. He later played for Sunshine George Cross and Parramatta Eagles at national level. He also played for Avala. In 1994, Foster moved to Kitchee SC in Hong Kong before moving on a free transfer to Instant Dict FC. He came back to Australia and played for Northern Spirit FC and Brisbane Strikers in the National Soccer League (NSL).

== Honours ==
Hong Kong First Division League Top Scorer:1995–96,1996–97,1997–98
