= Patrick Pascal =

Nigerian association football player

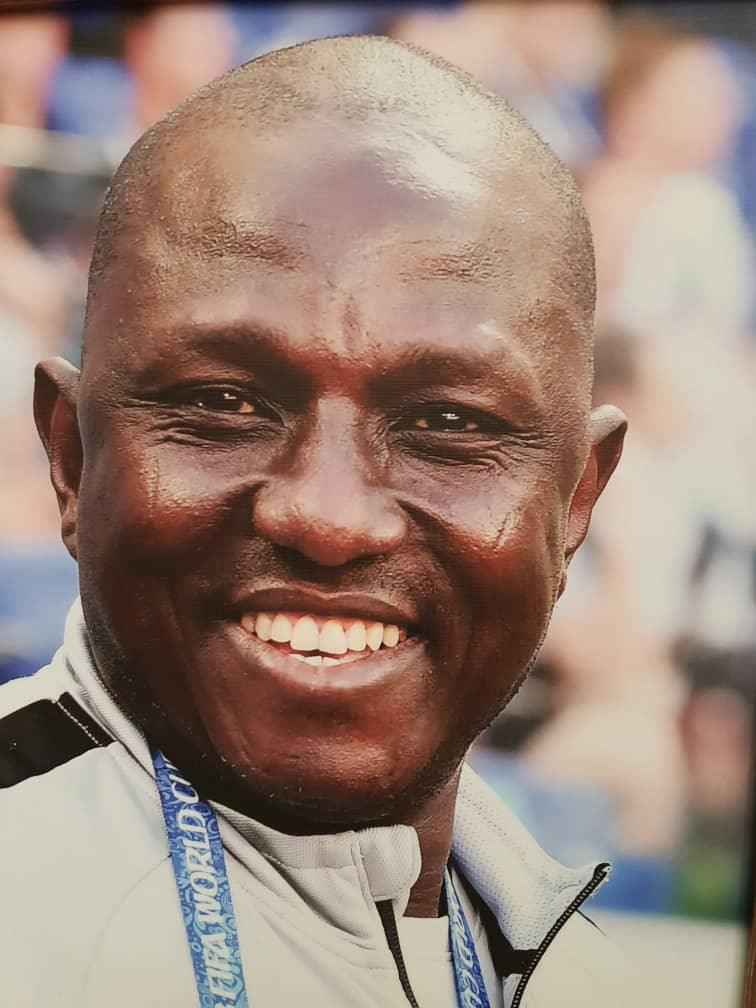
- Pascal Patrick

Personal information
- Full name: Patrick Pascal
- Date of birth: 24 December 1974 (age 51)
- Place of birth: Bauchi, Bauchi
- Height: 1.80 m (5 ft 11 in)
- Position: Utility player

Youth career
- Wikki Tourists F.C

Senior career*
Years	Team	Apps	(Gls)
1992-1992	Wikki Tourists F.C	24	(9)
1993-1996	Shooting Stars FC	103	(19)
1996-1997	Gençlerbirliği S.K.	29	(13)
1998-1999	Altay Izmir	45	(20)
2000-2001	Royal Antwerp	9	(2)
2001-2002	Lifan F.C.	25	(5)

International career^{‡}
1998-1999	Nigeria	11	(0)
- * Club domestic league appearances and goals as of 00:42, 20 October 2015 (UTC) ‡ National team caps and goals as of 00:42, 20 October 2015 (UTC)

Patrick Pascal (born 24 December 1974 in Bauchi) is a former Nigerian footballer, who is currently the Super Eagles team coordinator and chairman Bauchi Football Association

== Club career ==
Patrick started his career In 1992, he started his professional career in the Nigerian Premier League for Wikki Tourist. After a year in Bauchi, he moved to Shooting Stars FC, After scoring 43 goals in 103 appearances, he join Turkish club Gençlerbirliği Ankara in 1996. There he remained until 18 November 1997 and then signed with Altay Izmir. Scoring 20 goals in 45 appearances to move them out relegation. After the season, In January 2000, he return to Belgium and signed for Royal Antwerp after a successful trial. In December 2000 Pascal Join Lifan F.C. In China and retire in 2002

== International career ==
Patrick played in 1998 and 1999 in four internationals for the Nigerian national football team. Patrick Pascal was part of the Nigeria Olympic team that won gold medal in Atlanta 1996.

== Career as a functionary ==
After the end of his active career he became president of Wikki Tourists football club. He practiced this job out to the spring of 2012 and was then "Special Assistant" for the youth teams of the Nigeria Football Federation. Additionally, he works as a "head of youth work" of the Bauchi Football Association, He’s first vice-chairman of Bauchi FA and worked as Special Assistant on youth development under the Aminu Maigari administration and was a member of the Technical Committee under Pinnick Amaju, currently he is the coordinator of super eagles of Nigeria.

== Honours ==
=== Club ===
Shooting Star

- Nigeria Premier League 1995
- Challenge Cup 1995
- African Cup Of Champion Club Runner Up 1996

International

Nigeria Youth

- Olympic Gold Medal: 1996
- All African Games 1995 Bronze Medal
