= 2001 LG Cup (Egypt) =

2001 LG Cup Cairo, Egypt
Tournament details
- Host country: Egypt
- City: Cairo
- Dates: 24–26 April
- Teams: 4
- Venue: 1 (in 1 host city)

Final positions
- Champions: South Korea (2nd title)
- Runners-up: Egypt
- Third place: Canada
- Fourth place: Iran

Tournament statistics
- Matches played: 4
- Goals scored: 8 (2 per match)
- Top scorer: 8 players (1 goal)

The LG Cup Egypt is an exhibition association football tournament that took place in Cairo, Egypt in 2001.

== Participants ==
The participants were:

- Iran
- South Korea
- Canada
- Egypt

== Results ==
=== Semifinals ===
24 April 2001

South Korea	1–0	Iran
Kim Do-hoon 6' (pen.)	report report

International Stadium, Cairo
Attendance: 8,000
Referee: Mohamed Kamal Risha, Egypt

24 April 2001

Egypt	3–0	Canada
Sabri 3'; Hosni 25'; Barakat 43'	report

International Stadium, Cairo
Attendance: 25,000

=== Third place match ===
26 April 2001

Canada	1–0	Iran
Kusch 25'	report report

International Stadium, Cairo
Attendance: 10,000
Referee: Mohamed Kamal Risha, Egypt

=== Final ===
26 April 2001

Egypt	1–2	South Korea
Rahman 22'	report	Ha Seok-joo 12'; An Hyo-yeon 60'

International Stadium, Cairo
Attendance: 25,000

2001 LG Cup (Egypt) winner

South Korea
Second title

== Scorers ==
1 goal

- (Egypt) Abdel Sattar Sabry
- (Egypt) Ahmed Salah Hosni
- (Egypt) Mohamed Barakat
- (Egypt) Mazhar Abdel Rahman
- (Canada) Garret Kusch
- (South Korea) Ha Seok-ju
- (South Korea) An Hyo-yeon
- (South Korea) Kim Do-hoon

== See also ==
- LG Cup
