= Gençlerbirliği S.K. =

Turkish sports club

Gençlerbirliği
- Full name: Gençlerbirliği Spor Kulübü
- Nicknames: Gençler (The Youth); Ankara Rüzgârı (The Wind of Ankara); Alkaralar (The Red and Black)
- Founded: 14 March 1923; 103 years ago
- Stadium: Eryaman Stadium
- Capacity: 20,560
- Coordinates: 39°58′49″N 32°36′50″E
- President: Arda Çakmak
- Head coach: Bernd Storck
- League: Süper Lig
- 2025–26: Süper Lig, 14th of 18
- Website: www.genclerbirligi.org.tr
Home colours	Away colours	Third colours

Gençlerbirliği Spor Kulübü (pronounced Turkish pronunciation: [ɟentʃˈlæɾbiɾli.i]), commonly known as Gençlerbirliği, is a multi-sport organisation from Ankara best known for its men's professional football team, which currently competes in the Süper Lig and hosts matches at the 20,560-seat Eryaman Stadium on the city's western edge. Founded on 14 March 1923 by pupils of Ankara Erkek Lisesi who were excluded from their school side, the club soon became a symbol of youthful rebellion and has been nicknamed Ankara Rüzgârı ("Wind of Ankara") and Gençler ("The Youth") ever since. Its traditional colours are red and black, chosen—according to club lore—either because those were the only fabrics available at a local tailor or because they echo the red-and-black poppies that flower on the Anatolian steppe each spring.

Historically, Gençlerbirliği were a dominant force in the regional Ankara Football League, winning that competition a record nine times before the nationwide league system was introduced in 1959. National silverware followed: the club captured the Turkish Football Championship twice, in 1941 and 1946, and lifted the Turkish Cup in both 1987 and 2001; the latter triumph earned a memorable UEFA Cup run in 2003–04 in which the side eliminated Blackburn Rovers, Sporting CP and Parma before bowing out to eventual champions Valencia in the fourth round. League highlights include third-place finishes in 1965–66 and 2002–03, the latter season under manager Ersun Yanal producing the highest points total in club history.

Gençlerbirliği are also renowned for an academy and scouting network that has developed internationals such as Geremi, Isaac Promise and Arda Güler. The club's main rivalry is with fellow Ankara side Ankaragücü; their meetings are dubbed the Ankara derby and are among the oldest continuously played local derbies in Turkish football. Off the pitch, Gençlerbirliği have long been associated with pragmatic financial management—initiated by legendary president İlhan Cavcav—as well as a politically active supporter base known for choreographed tifos and social-justice campaigns.

== History ==
=== Founding and Early Years ===
Gençlerbirliği was founded on 14 March 1923 by a group of students at Ankara Sultanisi (a high school), after some were excluded from the school team called "Sultani." The founding students included Ramiz Eren, Mennan İz, Mazhar Atacanlı, Sait, Kenan, Nuri, Namık Katoğlu, Namık Ambarcıoğlu, Rıdvan Kırmacı, Hafı Araç, Ruhi, Sarı Ziya and Hakkı. One student, Asım, shared the situation with his father, a member of parliament, which helped the students form their own club. Since all members were students, they chose the name "Youth Union" (Gençlerbirliği). According to one version, the club's red and black colors were inspired by the Ankara tulip; another version claims it was due to a lack of fabric options at the time.

Initially, the group of 20–25 students played their first match against the Sultani team and won 3–0. After this, Gençlerbirliği started to gain recognition. As a symbolic gesture, the students presented a red-and-black bouquet to their teacher, solidifying the club's identity with these colors.

=== Ankara League and National Championships ===
In the 1922–23 season, the team competed in the Ankara Football League under the name "Ankara Sultanisi." However, the principal Münif Kemal Ak banned students from playing football, leading to the team's withdrawal. A year later, when a new principal, Cemal Bey, allowed sports again, Gençlerbirliği rejoined the league and finished fourth.

Münif Kemal Ak returned to Ankara later and was elected club president, also becoming the founding president of Gençlerbirliği. With support from education minister Mustafa Necati Uğural, who provided significant help, the club was able to recruit graduates and strengthen the team.

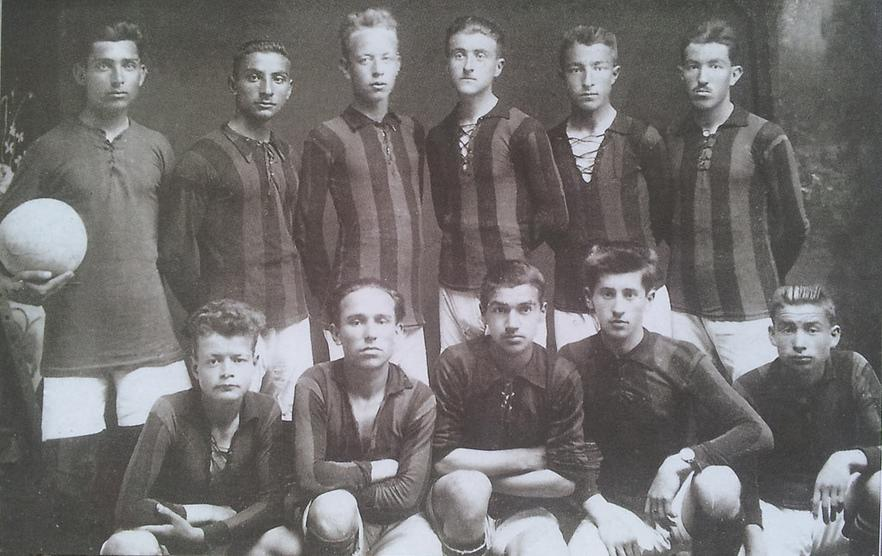
Gençlerbirliği squad in 1924.

Between 1923–28, Gençlerbirliği failed to win the league but captured their first title in the 8th season of the Ankara League, defeating teams like İmalat-ı Harbiye, Çankaya, and Altınordu. The first paid match they played was against Ankaragücü in 1925.

In the early 1930s, Gençlerbirliği won three consecutive titles (1930–31, 1931–32, 1933–34). They missed some seasons but returned strong in 1933–34, finishing second, then won again in 1934–35 (their fifth title). In 1936–37, they lost the title in a close race with rivals Ankaragücü. After two quiet years, they won the league again in 1939–40 and 1940–41. In 1941, they became national champions for the first time by winning the Turkish Football Championship, beating Beşiktaş 4–1 in the final.

In the following years 1941–44, they didn't participate in the league. In 1945–46, they returned to win the league again. That same year, they represented Ankara in the national championship and once more beat Beşiktaş, 2–1, to claim a second national title. Gençlerbirliği won a total of three national championships, alongside clubs like Fenerbahçe, Beşiktaş, and Harp Okulu.

=== Final Years of the Ankara League and Entry into National Competition ===
Turkish newspaper Yeni Sabah announcing the Turkish championship title of Gençlerbirliği on 16 July 1941.

In 1946–47, they won their group but didn't become champions. Though they won back-to-back titles in 1947–48 and 1948–49, they couldn't win again over the next eight seasons. Still, they finished as the most successful club in Ankara League history, with 10 championships.

In 1951, they reached the national final again but lost 3–0 to Beşiktaş. After the creation of the professional Süper Lig in 1959, the Ankara League was discontinued, and Gençlerbirliği became one of four Ankara teams in the new national league.

=== League and Professional Era (1959–2000) ===
Gençlerbirliği joined the newly established Süper Lig in the 1959–60 season as one of the top clubs from the Ankara regional league, alongside Hacettepe, Ankaragücü, and Ankara Demirspor. Competing in the Red Group, they finished seventh with 10 points in their debut season. In the 1960–61 season, the club achieved its best Süper Lig result to that point, finishing fifth with 45 points. This marked their highest league finish during the early professional era. The following season 1961–62, Gençlerbirliği participated in international competitions for the first time, entering the Balkans Cup and the Inter-Cities Fairs Cup.

From 1962 to 1969, the team maintained mid-table standings. Their best placement in this period came in 1962–63, when they finished second in the Red Group and advanced to the championship group. They remained a stable first-division team, but failed to challenge for the title. Another highlight came in 1965–66, when they matched their future 2002–03 best finish by coming in third.

In 1969–70, Gençlerbirliği were relegated from the top flight for the first time after finishing 15th. They spent most of the 1970s fluctuating between divisions. Although they came close to promotion in 1973–74, they did not succeed until 1978–79, when they finished second in the 2. Lig Kırmızı Grup and earned promotion back to the top tier. Due to structural changes, they were readmitted to the second tier after a league merger, despite finishing second-from-bottom in 1979–80. They later won Group D of the 1982–83 Second League and returned to the top flight after 13 years. They were relegated again in 1987–88, but returned in 1988–89 at the first attempt.

During the 1980s, the club was once again relegated (1979–80), promoted (1982–83), and relegated again (1987–88). Notably in 1986–87, they finished fourth in the 1. Lig, qualifying for European competition for the first time. The 1990s saw managerial instability but occasional success. Under Valery Nepomnyashchy in 1992–93, Gençlerbirliği restructured. In 1994–95, the club reached the Turkish Cup Final losing to Trabzonspor. They were also eliminated by Fenerbahçe in the 1996–97 Turkish Cup semi-finals. In 1998–99 with Yılmaz Vural, they finished eighth in the league and were eliminated by Beşiktaş in the quarter-finals of the Turkish Cup.

=== 2000s – Domestic Peaks and a European Fairytale ===
Gençlerbirliği opened the decade on a high by winning the 2000–01 Turkish Cup, beating Fenerbahçe 4–1 on penalties after a 2–2 draw in Kayseri – the club's first major silverware since 1987. Under coach Ersun Yanal, the Ankara side then delivered its best ever Süper Lig finish, taking third place in 2002–03 behind Beşiktaş and Galatasaray, and reached the cup final that same season (lost 3–1 to Trabzonspor).

The 2003–04 UEFA Cup campaign became club folklore. Gençlerbirliği swept past Blackburn Rovers (4–2 agg.), Sporting CP (4–3 agg.) and Parma (4–0 agg.) before falling 2-1 on aggregate to eventual winners Valencia in the fourth round. Domestically, they reached a second straight cup final but were routed 4–0 by Trabzonspor. Momentum stalled the next year a first–round UEFA Cup exit to Greek side Egaleo punctured hopes, though league form remained steady and they posted back-to-back sixth-place finishes in 2005–06 and 2006–07.

In 2007-08, the club displayed an aptitude for knockout football. After eliminating Galatasaray and Fenerbahçe, Gençlerbirliği drew 0–0 with Kayserispor in the Turkish Cup final, losing a penalty shootout 11–10. Throughout the decade, the club became known for its strong performances in cup competitions and several competitive European campaigns. The club's effective scouting network recruited players such as Souleymane Youla, Ahmed Hassan, Filip Daems and Tomasz Zdebel. Although Gençlerbirliği never reached the league's top three again, the "Ankara Storm" ended the 2000s firmly established as one of Turkey's more competitive mid-table sides.

In the 2020–21 season, the club finished last in the league with only 38 points from 40 matches and was relegated. During the 2021–22 season, chairman Murat Cavcav stepped down and was succeeded by Niyazi Akdaş, who uncovered a debt of over 130 million₺ and oversaw a transfer ban. In the 2022–23 season, Gençlerbirliği avoided relegation despite a weak squad and a transfer ban, finishing just three points above the drop zone. In 2024–25, Gençlerbirliği began the season under Recep Karatepe, but after poor results, he was replaced by Hüseyin Eroğlu. In May 2025, Gençlerbirliği defeated Yeni Malatyaspor 5–0 on the final day of the season, finishing second in the TFF First League with 68 points and earning promotion back to the Süper Lig after a four-year absence. At the June 2025 General Assembly, a controversial motion was passed proposing to ban new sponsorships tied to president Sungur due to alleged conflicts of interest.

== Grounds ==
After using several municipal pitches in its early decades, Gençlerbirliği moved into the Ankara 19 Mayıs Stadium in 1936. Originally a 19,000-seat bowl, 19 Mayıs hosted league games, national ceremonies and the club's first Turkish Cup triumph in 1987. Capacity and facilities were gradually modernised, but the ground was ultimately demolished in August 2018 to make way for a completely new arena on the same site.

While the 45,000-seat New Ankara Stadium (scheduled for completion in 2026) is rising on that footprint, Gençlerbirliği have shared the purpose-built Eryaman Stadium in Etimesgut since January 2019. The 20,560-all-seater venue—fitted with hybrid grass, undersoil heating and 51 boxes—also hosts city rivals Ankaragücü.

The club's day-to-day work is based at the Beştepe İlhan Cavcav Training Complex, a 50-acre facility and academy campus opened in 1979 under long-time president İlhan Cavcav.

== Statistics ==
=== Results of League and Cup Competitions by Season ===
Season	League table										Turkish Cup	UEFA	Top scorer	
Season	League	Pos	P	W	D	L	GF	GA	GD	Pts	Turkish Cup	UEFA	Player	Goals
1959	Süper Lig	7th	14	1	8	5	10	18	−8	10	~~N/A.~~	DNQ	Orhan Yüksel	4
1959–60	Süper Lig	10th	38	12	11	15	50	46	+4	35	~~N/A.~~	DNQ	Zeynel Soyuer	13
1960–61	Süper Lig	5th	38	16	13	9	54	39	+15	45	~~N/A.~~	DNQ	Zeynel Soyuer	16
1961–62	Süper Lig	6th	38	16	9	13	57	47	+10	41	~~N/A.~~	DNQ	Özkan Gürgün	13
1962–63	Süper Lig	6th	22	5	11	6	32	30	+2	26	SF	DNQ	Özkan Gürgün	23
1963–64	Süper Lig	9th	34	9	15	10	28	38	−10	33	R3	DNQ	Abdullah Çevrim	7
1964–65	Süper Lig	14th	30	10	6	14	33	47	−14	26	QF	DNQ	Abdullah Çevrim	9
1965–66	Süper Lig	3rd	30	15	8	7	32	24	+8	38	SF	DNQ	Abdullah Çevrim	15
1966–67	Süper Lig	6th	32	8	15	9	35	28	+7	31	R3	DNQ	Salim Görür	15
1967–68	Süper Lig	8th	32	11	10	11	28	26	+2	32	R1	DNQ	Salim Görür	12
1968–69	Süper Lig	10th	30	8	11	11	28	26	+2	27	R2	DNQ	Hayrettin Endersert	6
1969–70	Süper Lig	15th↓	30	7	8	15	17	33	−16	22	R1	DNQ	Tevfik Bal	6
1970–71	1. Lig	5th	30	11	12	7	26	14	+12	34	~~N/A.~~	DNQ	Mustafa Göç	5
1971–72	1. Lig	6th	30	9	12	9	25	21	+4	30	~~N/A.~~	DNQ	Naci Renklibay	12
1972–73	1. Lig	13th	30	6	15	9	19	22	−3	27	~~N/A.~~	DNQ	Mehmet Bulduk	7
1973–74	1. Lig	6th	30	12	7	11	34	31	+3	31	~~N/A.~~	DNQ	Feridun Öztürk	8
1974–75	1. Lig	12th	30	11	6	13	33	33	0	28	~~N/A.~~	DNQ	~~N/A.~~	~~N/A.~~
1975–76	1. Lig	12th	30	8	11	11	26	24	+2	27	R2	DNQ	~~N/A.~~	~~N/A.~~
1976–77	1. Lig	9th	30	11	6	13	36	34	+2	28	R2	DNQ	~~N/A.~~	~~N/A.~~
1977–78	1. Lig	10th	32	10	10	12	33	44	−11	30	R2	DNQ	~~N/A.~~	~~N/A.~~
1978–79	1. Lig	15th↓	30	9	4	17	20	29	−9	22	R3	DNQ	~~N/A.~~	~~N/A.~~
1979–80	2. Lig	7th↑	28	8	8	12	28	28	0	24	R3	DNQ	~~N/A.~~	~~N/A.~~
1980–81	1. Lig	17th	34	8	11	15	30	42	−12	27	R2	DNQ	~~N/A.~~	~~N/A.~~
1981–82	1. Lig	3rd	28	12	9	7	32	24	+8	33	R4	DNQ	~~N/A.~~	~~N/A.~~
1982–83	1. Lig	1st↑	30	21	7	2	61	19	+42	49	R5	DNQ	~~N/A.~~	~~N/A.~~
1983–84	Süper Lig	11th	34	7	17	10	28	34	−6	31	R6	DNQ	Vehbi Günay	6
1984–85	Süper Lig	11th	34	9	13	12	41	45	−4	31	QF	DNQ	Reşit Kaynak	6
1985–86	Süper Lig	9th	36	10	14	12	40	53	−13	34	QF	DNQ	İsmail Akbaşlı	10
1986–87	Süper Lig	12th	36	8	17	11	32	39	−7	33	W	DNQ	Harun Erol	13
1987–88	Süper Lig	19th↓	38	7	9	22	41	65	−24	30	R3	R1	Muammer Nurlu	11
1988–89	1. Lig	1st↑	32	23	7	2	73	24	+49	76	R2	DNQ	Muammer Nurlu	18
1989–90	Süper Lig	11th	34	11	12	11	50	51	−1	45	R5	DNQ	Olkan Yavruoğlu	11
1990–91	Süper Lig	10th	30	9	9	12	36	47	−11	36	R6	DNQ	Kemal Yıldırım	18
1991–92	Süper Lig	10th	30	7	13	10	40	46	−6	34	QF	DNQ	Avni Okumuş	9
1992–93	Süper Lig	10th	30	9	8	13	41	56	−15	35	R6	DNQ	Hayrettin Aksoy	14
1993–94	Süper Lig	7th	30	13	5	12	51	51	0	44	R6	DNQ	Andre Kona	20
1994–95	Süper Lig	5th	34	17	8	9	61	45	+16	59	R6	DNQ	Tarık Daşgün	13
1995–96	Süper Lig	10th	34	10	11	13	41	48	−7	41	QF	DNQ	Andre Kona	13
1996–97	Süper Lig	11th	34	11	6	17	37	49	−12	39	QF	DNQ	Pascal Patrick	12
1997–98	Süper Lig	14th	34	9	11	14	41	46	−5	38	R6	DNQ	Erkan Sözeri	8
1998–99	Süper Lig	8th	34	12	10	12	49	47	+2	46	R6	DNQ	Ümit Karan	14
1999–2000	Süper Lig	5th	34	16	8	10	57	47	+10	56	R3	DNQ	Ümit Karan	18
2000–01	Süper Lig	10th	34	14	4	16	44	53	−9	46	W	DNQ	Ümit Karan	20
2001–02	Süper Lig	8th	34	11	12	11	47	51	−4	45	R4	R1	Souleymane Youla	11
2002–03	Süper Lig	3rd	34	19	9	6	76	40	+36	66	RU	N/A	Ahmed Hassan	21
2003–04	Süper Lig	10th	34	12	8	14	56	52	+4	44	RU	R32	Souleymane Youla	18
2004–05	Süper Lig	5th	34	14	9	11	52	41	+11	51	R2	R2	Souleymane Youla	14
2005–06	Süper Lig	6th	34	14	9	11	47	39	+8	51	GS	DNQ	Mehmet Çakır	15
2006–07	Süper Lig	6th	34	14	6	14	43	42	+1	48	QF	DNQ	Okan Öztürk	13
2007–08	Süper Lig	15th	34	9	8	17	44	51	−7	35	RU	DNQ	Isaac Promise	11
2008–09	Süper Lig	14th	34	10	8	16	38	50	−12	38	R2	DNQ	Mustafa Pektemek	8
2009–10	Süper Lig	10th	34	12	11	11	38	35	+3	47	PO	DNQ	Mustafa Pektemek	11
2010–11	Süper Lig	14th	34	10	10	14	43	51	−8	40	SF	DNQ	Oktay Delibalta	8
2011–12	Süper Lig	9th	34	13	10	11	49	48	+1	49	R2	DNQ	Hervé Tum	16
2012–13	Süper Lig	11th	34	10	15	9	46	47	−1	45	R5	DNQ	Björn Vleminckx	9
2013–14	Süper Lig	9th	34	13	6	15	39	43	−4	45	R4	DNQ	Bogdan Stancu	13
2014–15	Süper Lig	9th	34	10	10	14	46	44	+2	40	QF	DNQ	Bogdan Stancu	11
2015–16	Süper Lig	10th	34	13	6	15	42	42	0	45	R3	DNQ	Moestafa El Kabir	11
2016–17	Süper Lig	8th	34	12	10	12	33	34	−1	46	R16	DNQ	Serdar Gürler	17
2017–18	Süper Lig	17th↓	34	8	9	17	37	54	−17	33	QF	DNQ	Petar Škuletić	11
2018–19	1. Lig	2nd↑	34	22	4	8	50	28	+22	70	R5	DNQ	Nadir Çiftçi	12
2019–20	Süper Lig	12th	34	9	9	16	39	56	−17	36	R4	DNQ	Bogdan Stancu	14
2020–21	Süper Lig	20th↓	40	10	8	22	44	76	−32	38	R5	DNQ	Bogdan Stancu	7
2021–22	1. Lig	13th	36	14	6	16	44	54	−10	48	R4	DNQ	Sandro Lima	13
2022–23	1. Lig	15th	36	10	8	18	46	55	−9	38	R5	DNQ	Gökhan Gül	6
2023–24	1. Lig	8th	34	13	12	9	39	33	+6	51	R16	DNQ	Melih Bostan	9
2024–25	1. Lig	2nd↑	38	19	11	8	57	34	+23	68	R5	DNQ	Metehan Mimaroğlu	14
2025–26	Süper Lig	TBD												

=== League participations ===
- Süper Lig: 1959–1970, 1983–1988, 1989–2018, 2019–2021, 2025–
- 1. Lig: 1970–1979, 1980–1983, 1988–1989, 2018–2019, 2021–2025
- 2. Lig: 1979–1980

== Colours and crest ==
Gençlerbirliği have worn red and black since the club were founded on 14 March 1923. Two traditional explanations exist for the choice: one claims the founding students could find only red-and-black cloth at a tailor in Ulus, the other links the colours to the red-and-black poppies (gelincik) that blanket the Ankara plain each spring.

The badge has evolved through six principal designs. The first crest, introduced in 1923, was a small shield with diagonal red-and-black stripes and the club name handwritten across the top. By the late 1920s this gave way to a black triangular pennant that carried the white initials "G B" and the date "1923". In the early 1930s Gençlerbirliği switched to a minimalist "G B" monogram, which appeared only on playing shirts. A fully-circular emblem arrived in the 1940s, created by future president Namık Ambarcıoğlu: a yellow border contained the club name and founding year, framing a simple football motif. During the late 1960s a new roundel added the 19-ray Hittite Sun disk—an emblem of Ankara—above a central football, a design that remained until the modern era. The current version, adopted in the early 1990s and retained with only typographic refinements, places the Hittite Sun and football on a black field edged by a red crescent; a white outer ring bears two five-pointed stars and the legend "ANKARA • GENÇLERBİRLİĞİ SPOR KULÜBÜ", with the year "1923" below. The crescent and star echo the Turkish flag, while the Hittite Sun underscores the club's link to the capital and its ancient heritage.

=== Kit suppliers and shirt sponsors ===
Period	Kit manufacturer	Shirt sponsor
1995-1996	Asics	Bastaş Beton
1996–1998	Adidas	Vakıf Bank
1998-1999	Adidas	Bastaş Beton
1999–2000	Puma	Yurtbank
2000-2002	Puma	OFTAŞ
2002–2005	Adidas	M Oil
2005–2010	Lotto	Turkcell
2010–2012	Lotto	Caprice Gold
2012–2016	Lotto	İCK Yapı
2016–2018	Lotto	ARTE
2018–2019	Lotto	–
2019–2020	Nike	–
2020–2021	Macron	Skyline Tower
2021–2022	Joma	–
2022–2023	Nike	Kutup
2023–2024	Nike	Arslanca Energy
2024–	Nike	Otokar

== Rivalry ==
Gençlerbirliği’s arch-rival is neighbouring club Ankaragücü, and meetings of the two sides are known as the “Ankara derby” or “Derby of the Capital”. The first recorded official match between the clubs was played on 21 March 1937 in the Milli Küme at the old Ankara 19 Mayıs Stadium, with Gençlerbirliği winning 4–2. As of April 2025 they have faced each other 90 times in official competition: Gençlerbirliği hold 35 wins, Ankaragücü 32, with 23 draws. The largest victory in the fixture is Ankaragücü’s 7–2 league win on 10 February 1991, while Gençlerbirliği’s widest margin is a 4–0 success on 5 March 2005.

Since 2019 both clubs have shared the 20,560-seat Eryaman Stadium, although most historic derbies were staged at the now-demolished Ankara 19 Mayıs Stadium. Matches are generally passionate yet comparatively friendly; Ankaragücü traditionally draw the larger fanbase, whereas Gençlerbirliği are noted for a smaller but politically active support.

== Youth development and player recruitment ==
Gençlerbirliği are widely regarded as one of Turkey's foremost talent producers, thanks to an expansive scouting network created during the long presidency of İlhan Cavcav (1978–2017). The model focuses on recruiting raw prospects from Anatolia, West Africa and Central Africa, introducing them to first-team football and funding the club through timely transfers.

Notable graduates include Cameroonian midfielder Geremi, who joined from Racing Bafoussam in 1997 and was sold to Real Madrid two years later before moving to Chelsea; Nigerian forward Isaac Promise, top scorer of the 2005–06 Gençlerbirliği side; and attacking midfielder Arda Güler, who entered the Beştepe system at age nine and later moved to Fenerbahçe before his 2023 transfer to Real Madrid.

The club's academy complex, Beştepe İlhan Cavcav Tesisleri, occupies 50 acres (200,000 m^{2}) in the Beştepe district of Ankara and features multiple grass pitches, an indoor arena, classrooms, a dormitory and a performance-analysis centre. Gençlerbirliği continue to field one of the youngest squads in the Turkish professional tiers, sustaining operations by transferring academy products to larger clubs while replenishing the roster with new domestic and African recruits.

== Honours ==
=== Domestic competitions ===
- Turkish Football Championship
  - Winners (2): 1941, 1946
  - Runners-up (1): 1950
- TFF 1. Lig
  - Winners (2): 1982–83, 1988–89
  - Runners-up (1): 2018–19, 2024–25
- Turkish Cup
  - Winners (2): 1986–87, 2000–01
  - Runners-up (3): 2002–03, 2003–04, 2007–08
- Turkish Super Cup
  - Runners-up (1): 1987
- Prime Minister's Cup
  - Runners-up (1): 1946

=== Regional competitions ===
- Ankara Football League
  - Winners (10) (record): 1929–30, 1930–31, 1931–32, 1932–33, 1934–35, 1939–40, 1940–41, 1945–46, 1949–50, 1950–51
  - Runners-up (7): 1926, 1926–27, 1929, 1934, 1936–37, 1942–43, 1947–48
- Ankara Shield
  - Winners (3) : 1931, 1935, 1940–41

=== Others ===
- TSYD Cup
  - Winners (16): 1969, 1985, 1986, 1989, 1993, 1994, 1998, 2002, 2003, 2006, 2010, 2011, 2012, 2016, 2019, 2021

== Gençlerbirliği in Europe ==
Gençlerbirliği experienced their first taste of European competition in the 1967–68 Balkans Cup. However, they only managed one draw in six group matches. In 1987, they won the Turkish Cup and qualified for the 1987–88 UEFA Cup Winners' Cup, where they were drawn against Soviet side Dinamo Minsk. Gençlerbirliği lost 2–0 away and won 2–1 at home but were eliminated in the first round on aggregate. In the 1994–95 season, they finished third in the Turkish First League and qualified for the 1995 UEFA Intertoto Cup as Turkey's representative. Competing in Group 11, Gençlerbirliği finished with 2 wins and 2 losses but failed to advance.

In 2001, after winning the Turkish Cup, the club entered the 2001–02 UEFA Cup. In the first round, they faced Swedish club Halmstad. After drawing 1–1 in Ankara, they lost the return leg 1–0 and were eliminated early. Gençlerbirliği's greatest success in Europe came in the 2003–04 UEFA Cup. In the first round, they defeated Blackburn Rovers of England, winning 3–1 at home before drawing 1–1 away. In the second round, they faced Portugal's Sporting CP, drawing 1–1 at home and winning the return leg 3–0 in Lisbon. In the third round, they eliminated Italian side Parma with a 1–0 away win and a 3–0 victory at home. In the fourth round, they were drawn against Valencia of Spain. Gençlerbirliği won the first leg 1–0 in Ankara. However, after losing 1–0 in the return leg, the match went into extra time, where Valencia scored twice to win 2–0. Gençlerbirliği were eliminated despite a strong performance. Valencia would go on to win the UEFA Cup that season, and Gençlerbirliği were the only team to defeat them during the competition.

In the 2004–05 season, Gençlerbirliği reached the second qualifying round of the UEFA Cup, where they played against Croatian club Rijeka. After winning the home leg 1–0, they advanced past the round despite losing 2–1 in the return leg. In the first round proper, they faced Greek side Egaleo. Gençlerbirliği lost 1–0 away and drew 1–1 at home, thus being eliminated from the tournament.

=== Summary ===
As of 18 May 2025

==== UEFA competition ====
Competition	Pld	W	D	L	GF	GA	GD
UEFA Cup Winners' Cup	2	0	0	2	1	4	–3
UEFA Cup	14	6	4	4	17	11	+6
UEFA Intertoto Cup	4	2	0	2	10	7	+3
UEFA Total	20	8	4	8	28	22	+6

Balkans Cup

Competition	Pld	W	D	L	GF	GA	GD
Balkans Cup	6	0	1	5	3	10	–7
Total	6	0	1	5	2	1-	–7

=== UEFA competition results ===
Season	Competition	Round	Club	Home	Away	Aggregate
1987–88	UEFA Cup Winners' Cup	R1	(Soviet Union) Dinamo Minsk	1–2	0–2	1–4
1995	UEFA Intertoto Cup	Group 11	(France) Strasbourg	—N/a	1–4	3rd
1995	UEFA Intertoto Cup	Group 11	(Austria) Tirol Innsbruck	—N/a	2–3	3rd
1995	UEFA Intertoto Cup	Group 11	(Israel) Hapoel Petah Tikva	4–0	—N/a	3rd
1995	UEFA Intertoto Cup	Group 11	(Malta) Floriana	3–0	—N/a	3rd
2001–02	UEFA Cup	R1	(Sweden) Halmstad	1–1	0–1	1–2
2003–04	UEFA Cup	R1	(England) Blackburn Rovers	3–1	1–1	4–2
2003–04	UEFA Cup	R2	(Portugal) Sporting CP	1–1	3–0	4–1
2003–04	UEFA Cup	R3	(Italy) Parma	3–0	1–0	4–0
2003–04	UEFA Cup	R4	(Spain) Valencia	1–0	0–2 (a.e.t.)	1–2
2004–05	UEFA Cup	2QR	(Croatia) Rijeka	1–0	1–2	2–2 (a)
2004–05	UEFA Cup	R1	(Greece) Egaleo	1–1	0–1	1–2

=== Balkans Cup results ===
Season	Round	Club	Home	Away	Aggregate
1967–68	Group A	(Bulgaria) Beroe Stara Zagora	0–2	0–1	4th
1967–68	Group A	(Albania) Vllaznia Shkodër	1–1	0–1	4th
1967–68	Group A	(Romania) Farul Constanța	1–2	1–3	4th

=== UEFA Ranking history ===
Season	Rank	Points	Ref.
2002	157 ▲	15.362	
2003	162 ▼	15.495	
2004	88 ▲	23.656	
2005	94 ▼	23.872	
2006	106 ▼	22.634	
2007	106	21.791	
2008	100 ▲	23.469	
2009	171 ▼	7.445	

== Players ==
=== Current squad ===
As of 21 September 2026

Note: Flags indicate national team as defined under FIFA eligibility rules; some limited exceptions apply. Players may hold more than one non-FIFA nationality.

No.	Pos.	Nation	Player
2	DF	BRA	Thalisson
3	DF	TUR	Hamza Aydar
5	MF	NGR	Peter Etebo (captain)
6	DF	GRE	Dimitrios Goutas
7	MF	POR	Tiago Gouveia (on loan from Benfica)
9	FW	POR	Pedro Mendes
10	MF	ITA	Franco Tongya
11	DF	POR	Kévin Rodrigues
12	FW	NGR	Victor Orakpo (on loan from Nice)
13	DF	POR	Pedro Pereira
14	MF	MLI	Adama Traoré
15	DF	TUR	Arda Çağan Çelik
17	FW	TUR	Erk Aslan
19	MF	SEN	Cheikh Niasse (on loan from Hellas Verona)
20	FW	MLI	Sékou Koïta

No.	Pos.	Nation	Player
23	GK	TUR	Gökhan Akkan
35	MF	TUR	Oğulcan Ülgün
42	MF	GUI	Ousmane Diabaté (on loan from Newcastle United)
45	FW	LBR	Prince Martor Jr.
48	MF	TUR	Salih Uçan
52	MF	TUR	Göktuğ Erdem
53	DF	TUR	Ensar Çavuşoğlu
61	GK	TUR	Berk Deniz Çukurcu
70	GK	TUR	İrfan Can Eğribayat
77	DF	TUR	Abdurrahim Dursun
83	MF	POR	Rafael Luís
88	DF	TUR	Fıratcan Üzüm
90	DF	TUR	Metehan Baltacı (on loan from Galatasaray)
99	FW	TUR	Ayaz Özcan

=== Out on loan ===
Note: Flags indicate national team as defined under FIFA eligibility rules; some limited exceptions apply. Players may hold more than one non-FIFA nationality.

No.	Pos.	Nation	Player
—	FW	TUR	Fırat Tulgayoğlu (at Bigaspor until 30 June 2027)

== Non-playing staff ==
=== Administrative Staff ===
Position	Name
President	(Turkey) Osman Sungur
Vice President	(Turkey) Erhan Kızılmeşe
General Secretary	(Turkey) Taner Ünlü
Treasurer	(Turkey) Adem Becerikli
Finance VP	(Turkey) Serkan Yıldız
Board Member	(Turkey) Canpolat Aras
Board Member	(Turkey) Murat Karahan
Board Member	(Turkey) Mehmet Selvi
Board Member	(Turkey) Kenan Memiş
Board Member	(Turkey) Rıfat Songür
Board Member	(Turkey) Ateş Şendil
Board Member	(Turkey) Atilla Yıldırım
Board Member	(Turkey) İsmail Geliç
Board Member	(Turkey) Mehmet Kaya
Board Member	(Turkey) Eyüp Taymur
Board Member	(Turkey) Ömer Faruk Fukara
Board Member	(Turkey) Abdulfettah Doğan
Board Member	(Turkey) Mücahit Şentürk
Board Member	(Turkey) Aykut Çakmaklı
Board Member	(Turkey) Süleyman Yurtseven
Board Member	(Turkey) Özer Yıldırım
Board Member	(Turkey) Fuat Yılmaz
Board Member	(Turkey) Şanser Kadooğlu
Board Member	(Turkey) Mithat Akar
Board Member	(Turkey) Yalçın Artukoğlu

=== Coaching staff ===
Position	Name
Manager	Hüseyin Eroğlu
Assistant Manager	(Turkey) Halit Eroğlu
Assistant Manager	(Turkey) Burhan Alıcı
Assistant Manager	(Mali) Mustapha Yatabaré
Goalkeeping Coach	(Turkey) Neşet Büyükkılıç
Chief Analyst	(Turkey) Tolga Sayın
Athletic Coach	(Turkey) Alper Karaman
Athletic Coach	(Turkey) Dünyacan Çiçekverdi
Match Analyst	(Turkey) Mert Arda Açıköz
Club Doctor	(Turkey) Gürhan Dönmez
Masseur	(Turkey) Hakan Gökbulut
Masseur	(Turkey) Yaşar Enginar
Dietitian	(Turkey) Beril Köse

== Club records and notable players ==
Gençlerbirliği's all-time records are held by a handful of players who defined different eras of the club. Left-back Tevfik Kutlay made 353 first-team appearances between 1959 and 1972, more than any other player in the club's history. The all-time top scorer is Congolese striker Andre Kona N'Gole, who netted 72 goals in 145 matches across two spells between 1993 and 2001, and remains the only foreign player to lead a major statistical category at the club. Avni Okumuş and Orhan Yüksel, both products of the club, are close behind with 317 appearances and 71 goals, and 235 appearances and 67 goals respectively.

=== All-Time Leading Players ===
Player	Nat.	Period	Apps	Goals	Notes
Tevfik Kutlay	(Turkey)	1959–1972	353	46	Most capped player
Selçuk Çakmaklı	(Turkey)	1959–1972	336	–	–
Avni Okumuş	(Turkey)	1983–1993	317	71	2nd all-time top scorer
Zeynel Soyuer	(Turkey)	1959–1971	291	47	–
Nihat Baştürk	(Turkey)	1994–2005	279	–	–
Metin Diyadin	(Turkey)	1988–1998	265	–	Later became manager
Orhan Yüksel	(Turkey)	1959–1966	235	67	3rd all-time top scorer
Mehmet Şimşek	(Turkey)	1993–2001	228	–	–
İhsan Temen	(Turkey)	1959–1966	219	–	–
Okan Gedikali	(Turkey)	1982–1991	207	–	–
Kona N'Gole	(Democratic Republic of the Congo)	1993–2001	145	72	Club’s all-time top scorer
Ümit Karan	(Turkey)	1996–2001	150	59	Key forward in late 90s
Souleymane Youla	(Guinea)	2001–2005	134	57	Fan favorite
Bogdan Stancu	(Romania)	2013–2020	139	55	Top foreign scorer of 2010s
Abdullah Çevrim	(Turkey)	1961–1966	154	50	–
Muammer Nurlu	(Turkey)	1983–1989	152	44	–

== Coaches ==
Under Metin Türel, Gençlerbirliği captured their first national trophy by winning the 1986–87 Turkish Cup. Samet Aybaba delivered the club’s second Turkish Cup in 2000–01, defeating Fenerbahçe in the final (AET). The club’s most celebrated European run came under Ersun Yanal in the 2003–04 UEFA Cup. Gençlerbirliği eliminated Sporting CP and then beat Parma 3–0 in Ankara to win 4–0 on aggregate, before bowing out to the eventual winners Valencia (0–0 in Ankara; 0–2 AET in Mestalla).

Season(s)	Manager
1960–70	(Turkey) Yüksel Doğanay
1970	(Turkey) Oktay Arıca
1971–72	(Turkey) Kazım Türesin
1972–73	(Turkey) Yüksel Doğanay
1973–74	(Turkey) Fehmi Baştüzel
1975	(Turkey) Tevfik Kutluay
1975	(Turkey) Avni Bulduk
1975–76	(Turkey) Fehmi Baştüzel
1976	(Turkey) Avni Bulduk
1976–77	(Turkey) Oktay Arıca
1977–78	(Turkey) Ruhi Yavuz
1978–80	(Turkey) Fehmi Baştüzel
1981	(Turkey) Mümtaz Tümer
1981	(Turkey) Enver Ürekli
1981–82	(Turkey) Teoman Yamanlar
1982–83	(Turkey) Kadri Aytaç
1983–85	(Turkey) Tınaz Tırpan
1985–86	(Turkey) Erkan Kural
1986–87	(Turkey) Metin Türel
1987	(Turkey) Hüsnü Macurni
1987–88	(Turkey) Tınaz Tırpan
1988	(Turkey) Kadri Aytaç
1988	(Turkey) İbrahim Aydın
1988	(Turkey) Teoman Yamanlar
1988–89	(Turkey) Erkan Kural
1989	(Turkey) Gündüz Onay
1990	(Turkey) Metin Türel
1990–91	(Czech Republic) Jozef Jarabinský
1991–92	(Turkey) Aldoğan Argon
1992	(Turkey) Battal Tokyay
1992–93	(Russia) Valeri Nepomniachi
1993	(Turkmenistan) Kurban Berdyev
1994	(Peru) Augusto Palacios
1994	(Turkey) Zafer Göncüler
1994–95	(Turkey) Metin Türel
1995–96	(Belgium) Georges Heylens
1996	(Turkey) Metin Türel
1996–97	(Turkey) Sadi Tekelioğlu
1997	(Turkey) Teoman Yamanlar
1997	(Croatia) Luka Peruzović

Season(s)	Manager
1997–98	(Turkey) Yılmaz Vural
1998–00	(Slovakia) Karol Pecze
2000–01	(Turkey) Samet Aybaba
2001	(Turkey) Hasan Gül
2001	(Belgium) Walter Meeuws
2001–02	(Turkey) Erdoğan Arıca
2002–04	(Turkey) Ersun Yanal
2004	(Turkey) Erdoğan Arıca
2004	(Turkey) Oğuz Çetin
2004–05	(Turkey) Ziya Doğan
2005–07	(Turkey) Mesut Bakkal
2007	(Turkey) Fuat Çapa
2007	(Germany) Reinhard Stumpf
2013–14	(Turkey) Mehmet Özdilek
2014	(Turkey) Kemal Özdeş
2014	(Turkey) Mustafa Kaplan
2014–15	(Turkey) İrfan Buz
2015	(Turkey) Mesut Bakkal
2015	(Scotland) Stuart Baxter
2015	(Turkey) Mehmet Özdilek
2015	(Turkey) Yılmaz Vural
2016	(Turkey) İbrahim Üzülmez
2016–17	(Turkey) Ümit Özat
2017	(Turkey) Mesut Bakkal
2017–18	(Turkey) Ümit Özat
2018–19	(Turkey) Erkan Sözeri
2019	(Turkey) İbrahim Üzülmez
2019	(Turkey) Mustafa Kaplan
2019–20	(Turkey) Hamza Hamzaoğlu
2020	(Brazil) Mert Nobre
2020	(Turkey) Mustafa Kaplan
2021	(Turkey) Mehmet Altıparmak
2021	(Turkey) Özcan Bizati
2021–22	(Turkey) Metin Diyadin
2022	(Turkey) Medet Coşkun
2022	(Turkey) Taşkın Aksoy
2022–23	(Turkey) Mustafa Dalcı
2023–24	(Turkey) Sinan Kaloğlu
2024	(Turkey) Recep Karatepe
2024–	(Turkey) Hüseyin Eroğlu

== Presidents ==
The defining figure in the club’s modern governance was İlhan Cavcav, who served as president from 1977 until his death in January 2017, the longest continuous tenure among top-flight Turkish clubs of his era. During Cavcav’s presidency Gençlerbirliği won two Turkish Cups (1986–87 and 2000–01) and became a regular seller of academy and scouted talent to the “Big Three” and European clubs, a sustainable model underpinned by the Beştepe İlhan Cavcav Training Complex that bears his name. In recognition of his four decades of service, the Turkish Football Federation named the 2017–18 Süper Lig the “İlhan Cavcav Season.” Earlier presidents such as Mümtaz Tarhan (1955–57) and Orhan Şeref Apak (two spells in the 1949–50 and 1958–61 periods) oversaw key consolidation phases as the club navigated the amateur-to-professional transition in Turkish football.

Season(s)	President
1923–36	(Turkey) Münif Kemal Ak
1936–43	(Turkey) Saffet Gürol
1943–44	(Turkey) Namık Ambarlıoğlu
1944–46	(Turkey) Fevzi Magat
1947–48	(Turkey) Namık Katoğlu
1948–49	(Turkey) Yusuf Bahri
1949–50	(Turkey) Orhan Şeref Apak
1950–52	(Turkey) Reşat Taşer
1952–55	(Turkey) Nuri Togay
1955–57	(Turkey) Mümtaz Tarhan
1957–58	(Turkey) Ahmet Salih Korur
1958–61	(Turkey) Orhan Şeref Apak
1961–63	(Turkey) Turhan Ogan
1964–65	(Turkey) İbrahim Hatipoğlu

Season(s)	Manager
1965–66	(Turkey) Muslihittin Mete
1966–67	(Turkey) İsmet Sezgin
1967–68	(Turkey) Hadi Özbay
1968–69	(Turkey) Necip Türegen
1969–70	(Turkey) Mehmet Tuzcuoğlu
1970–72	(Turkey) Adil Evrensel
1972–74	(Turkey) Sezai Diblan
1976–77	(Turkey) Hasan Şengel
1977–17	(Turkey) İlhan Cavcav
2017–21	(Turkey) Murat Cavcav
2021–	(Turkey) Niyazi Akdaş

== See also ==
- Hacettepe SK — the reserve team of Gençlerbirliği
