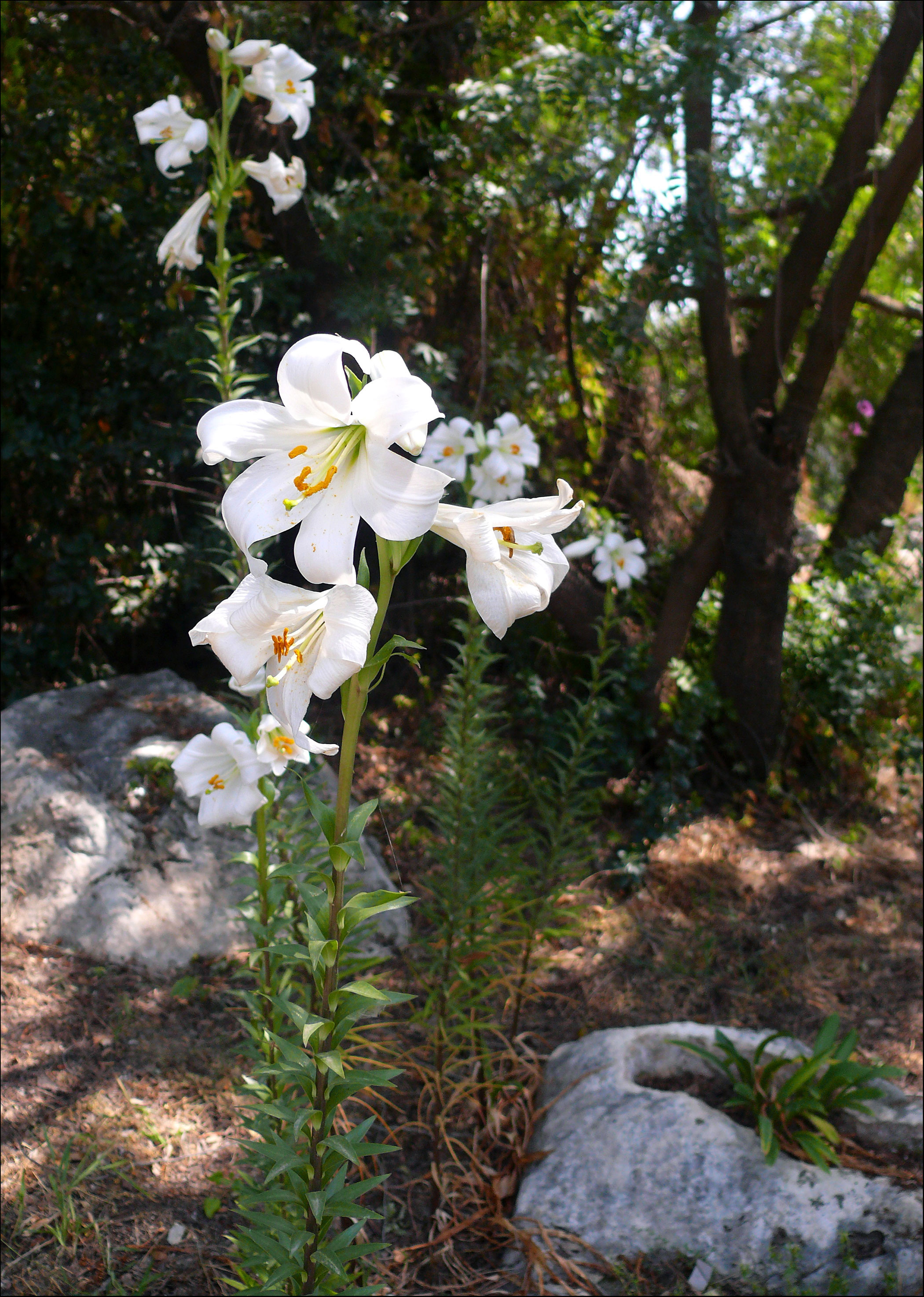
- Lilium candidum

Scientific classification
- Kingdom: Plantae
- Clade: Tracheophytes
- Clade: Angiosperms
- Clade: Monocots
- Order: Liliales
- Family: Liliaceae; Juss.

Type genus
- Lilium L. Sp. Pl. 1: 302. (1753)

Type species
- Lilium candidum L. Sp. Pl. 1: 302. (1753)

Subfamilies and tribes
- subfamily: Streptopoideae; subfamily: Calochortoideae; subfamily: Medeoloideae; subfamily: Lilioideae; tribe: Lilieae; tribe: Tulipeae; sensu APWeb

Diversity
- About 600 species

= Liliaceae =

Liliaceae Temporal range: 68–0 Ma Late Cretaceous - Recent

Family of flowering plants in order Liliales, including lilies

The lily family, Liliaceae, consists of about 15 genera and 610 species of flowering plants within the order Liliales. They are monocotyledonous, perennial, herbaceous geophytes, often growing from bulbs although some have rhizomes. The leaves are linear in shape, with their veins usually arranged parallel to the edges, single and arranged alternating on the stem, or in a rosette at the base. The flowers are large with six colored or patterned petaloid tepals (undifferentiated petals and sepals) arranged in two whorls of three, six stamens and a superior ovary. The fruit can be a berry or capsule, with seeds dispersed by animals or wind, respectively.

First described in 1789, the lily family became a paraphyletic "catch-all" (wastebasket) group of lilioid monocots that did not fit into other families and included many genera now included in other families (and in some cases in other orders). Consequently, treatments of "Liliaceae" often include these other taxa. The family likely evolved between 82 and 52 million years ago during the Late Cretaceous to Early Paleogene periods. Plants in this family have evolved with a fair amount of morphological diversity despite their genetic similarity.

Liliaceae are widely distributed, mainly in temperate regions of the Northern Hemisphere and the flowers are insect pollinated. Most of their genera, Lilium in particular, face considerable herbivory pressure from deer in some areas, both wild and domestic. Many Liliaceae are important ornamental plants, grown for their attractive flowers and involved in a major floriculture of cut flowers and dry bulbs. Some species are poisonous if eaten and can have adverse health effects in humans and household pets. Some species have been used as famine food. Lilies and tulips have symbolic and decorative value, appearing frequently in paintings and the decorative arts.

== Description ==
The Liliaceae are characterised as monocotyledonous, perennial, herbaceous, bulbous (or rhizomatous in the case of Medeoleae) flowering plants with simple trichomes (root hairs) and contractile roots. The diversity of characteristics complicates any description of the family's morphology, having confused taxonomic classification for centuries. The diversity is also of considerable evolutionary significance, as some members emerged from shaded areas and adapted to a more open environment.

Characteristics often vary by habitat, between shade-dwelling genera (such as Prosartes, Tricyrtis, Cardiocrinum, Clintonia, Medeola, Prosartes, and Scoliopus) and sun-loving genera. Shade-dwelling genera usually have broader leaves with smooth edges and net venation, and fleshy fruits (berries) with animal-dispersed seeds, rhizomes, and small, inconspicuous flowers. Meanwhile, genera native to sunny habitats usually have narrow, parallel-veined leaves, capsular fruits with wind-dispersed seeds, bulbs, and large, visually conspicuous flowers.

=== Leaves ===
The leaves are generally simple, elongated, entire (smooth and even), linear, oval to filiform (threadlike), mostly with parallel veins, but occasionally net-veined. They are alternate (single and alternating direction) and spiral, but may be whorled (three or more attached at one node, e.g. Lilium, Fritillaria), cauline (arranged along the aerial stem) or sheathed in a basal rosette. They are rarely petiolate (stalked), and lack stipules. The aerial stem is unbranched.

=== Inflorescence ===
✶ or ÷ P3+3 A3+3 G(3)
Floral formula of the Liliacaeae: Flowers actinomorphic or slightly zygomorphic with six tepals in two whorls of three, six stamens in two whorls of three, and a superior ovary with three fused carpels. (Note: Individual species and genera may have more or less derived formulas.)

The flowers may be arranged along the stem, developing from the base, as a single flower at the tip of the stem, or as a cluster of flowers. They contain both male (androecium) and female (gynoecium) characteristics and are symmetric radially, but sometimes as a mirror image. Most flowers are large and colourful, except for Medeoleae. Both the petals and sepals are usually similar and appear as two concentric groups (whorls) of 'petals', that are often striped or multicoloured, and produce nectar at their bases. The stamens are usually in two groups of three (trimerous) and the pollen has a single groove (monosulcate). The ovary is located above the attachment of the other parts (superior). There are three fused carpels (syncarpus) with one to three chambers (locules), a single style and a three-lobed stigma. The embryo sac is of the Fritillaria type.

Usually indeterminate (lacking terminal flower) as a raceme (Lilium); sometimes reduced to a single terminal flower (Tulipa). When pluriflor (multiple blooms), the flowers are arranged in a cluster or rarely are subumbellate (Gagea) or a thyrse (spike).

The flowers are hermaphroditic, actinomorphic (radially symmetric) or slightly zygomorphic (bilaterally symmetric), pedicellate (on a short secondary stem), generally large and showy but may be inconspicuous (Medeoleae). The bracts may (bracteate) or may not (ebracteate) be present. The perianth is undifferentiated (perigonium) and biseriate (two whorled), formed from six tepals arranged into two separate whorls of three parts (trimerous) each, although Scoliopus has only three petals, free from the other parts, but overlapping. The tepals are usually petaloid (petal like) and apotepalous (free) with lines (striate) or marks in other colors or shades. The perianth is either homochlamydeous (all tepals equal, e.g. Fritillaria) or dichlamydeous (two separate and different whorls, e.g. Calochortus) and may be united into a tube. Nectar is produced in perigonal nectaries at the base of the tepals.

The androecium consists of six stamens in two trimerous whorls, with free filaments, usually epiphyllous (fused to tepals) and diplostemonous (outer whorl of stamens opposite outer tepals and the inner whorl opposite inner tepals), although Scoliopus has three stamens opposite the outer tepals. The attachment of the anthers to the filaments may be either peltate (to the surface) or pseudo-basifixed (surrounding the filament tip, but not adnate, that is not fused) and dehisce longitudinally and are extrorse (dehiscing away from center). The pollen is usually monosulcate (single groove), but may be inaperturate (lacking aperture: Clintonia, some Tulipa spp.) or operculate (lidded: Fritillaria, some Tulipa spp.), and reticulate (net patterned: Erythronium, Fritillaria, Gagea, Lilium, Tulipa).

The gynoecium has a superior ovary (hypogynous), syncarpous (with fused carpels), with three connate (fused) carpels and is trilocular (three locules, or chambers) or unilocular (single locule, as in Scoliopus and Medeola). There is a single style and a three-lobed stigma or three stigmata more or less elongated along the style. There are numerous anatropous (curved) ovules which display axile placentation (parietal in Scoliopus and Medeola), usually with an integument and thinner megasporangium. The embryo sac (megagametophyte) varies by genera, but is mainly tetrasporic (e.g. Fritillaria). Embryo sacs in which three of the four megaspores fuse to form a triploid nucleus, are referred to as Fritillaria-type, a characteristic shared by all the core Liliales.

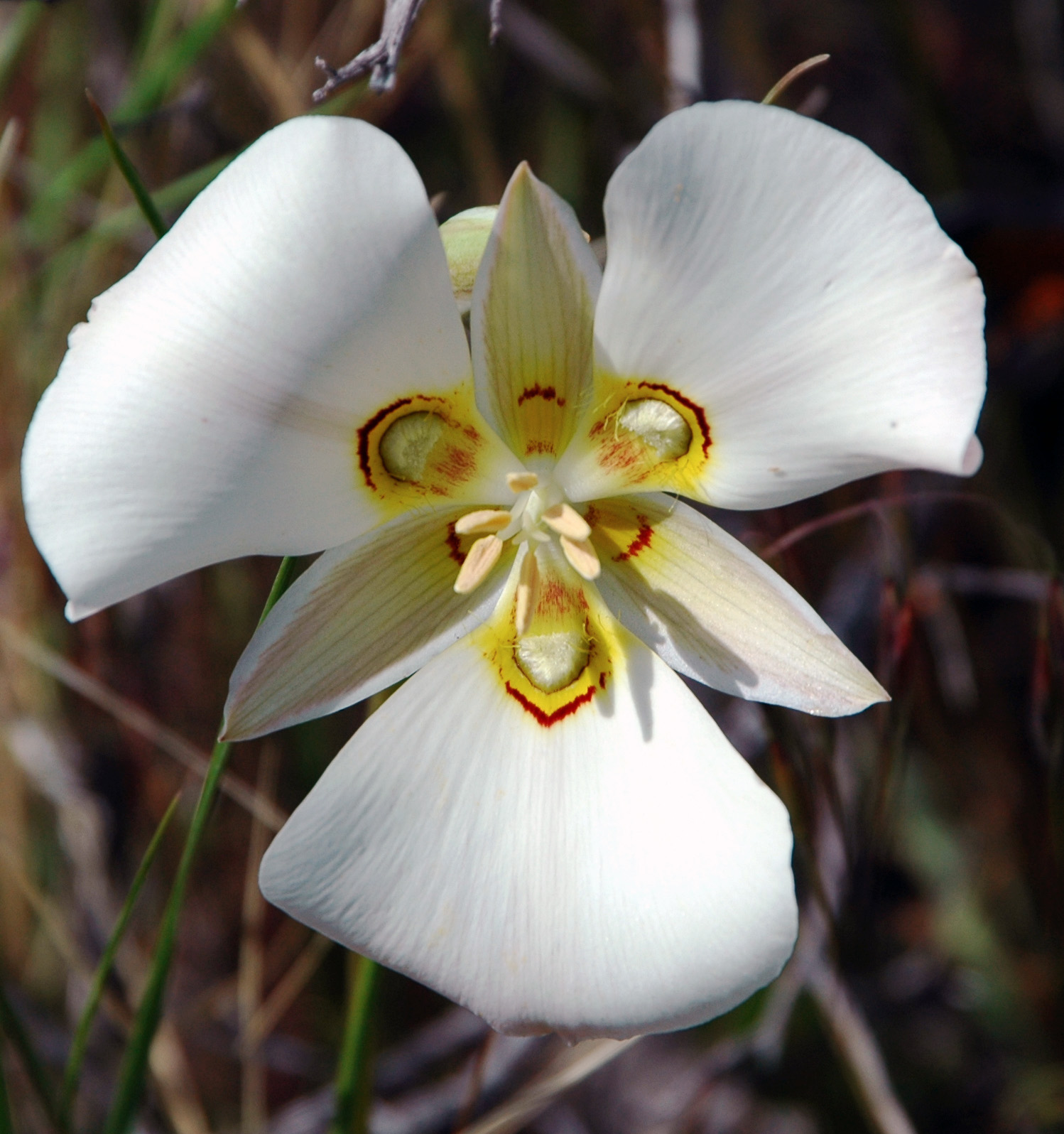
Calochortus nuttallii with three sepals and three petals

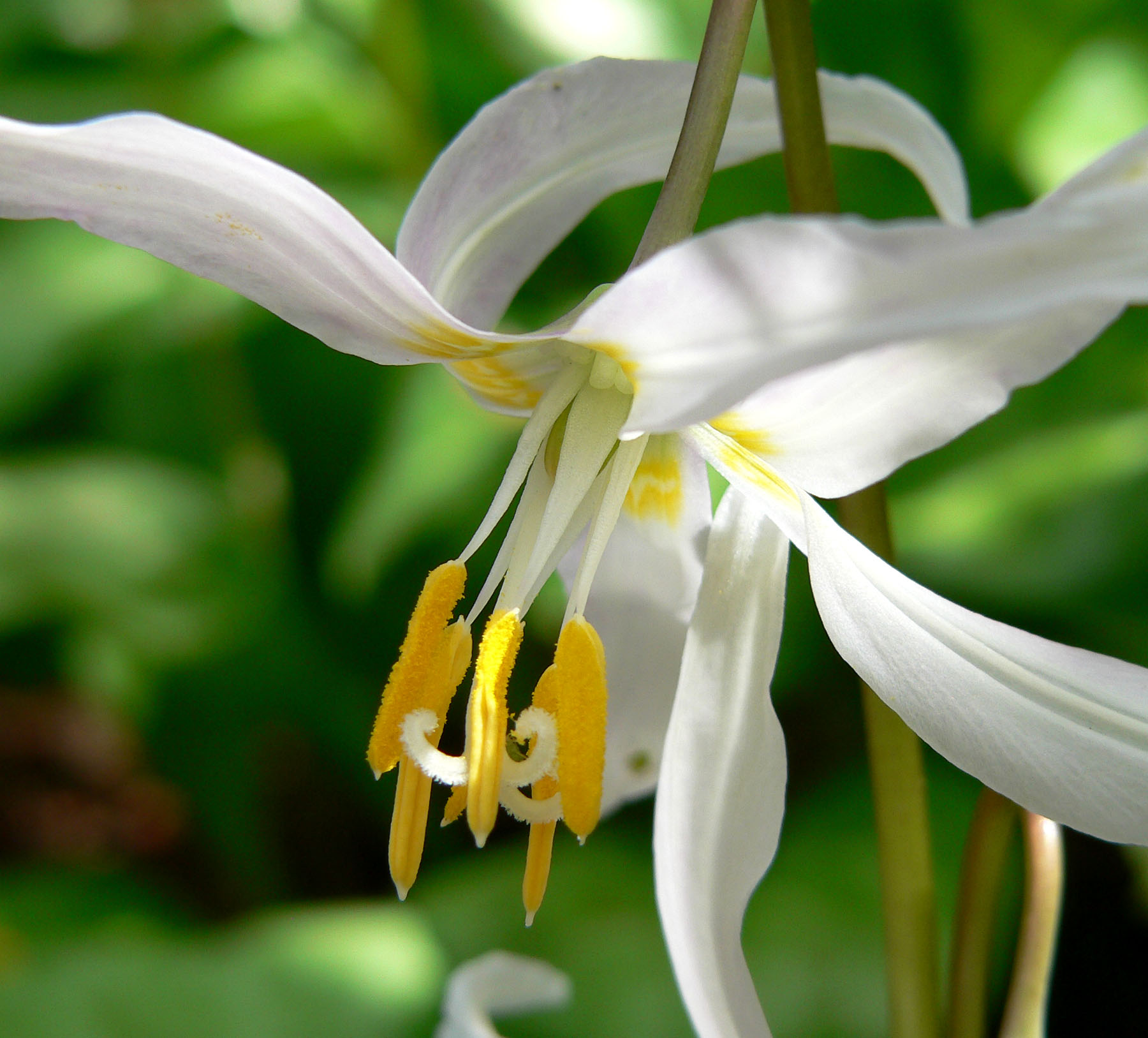
Erythronium revolutum flower with three stigmata and pseudo-basifixed anthers around the filament tip

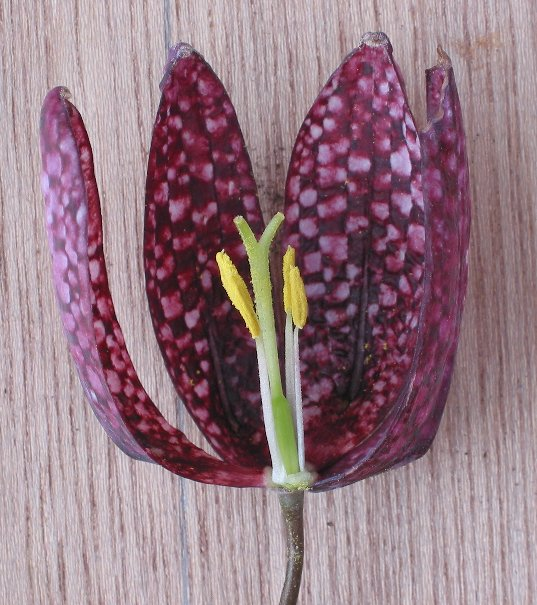
Fritillaria meleagris flower section

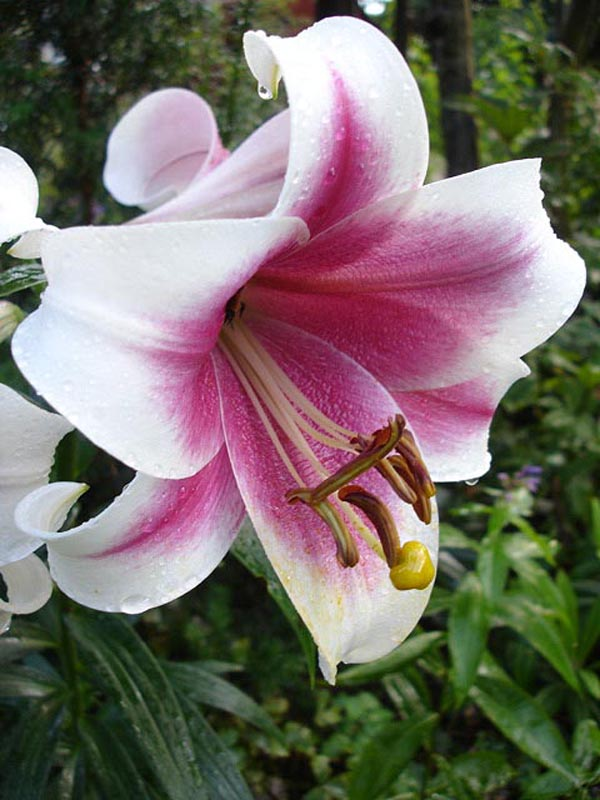
Lilium flower with six undifferentiated tepals and side-connected anthers

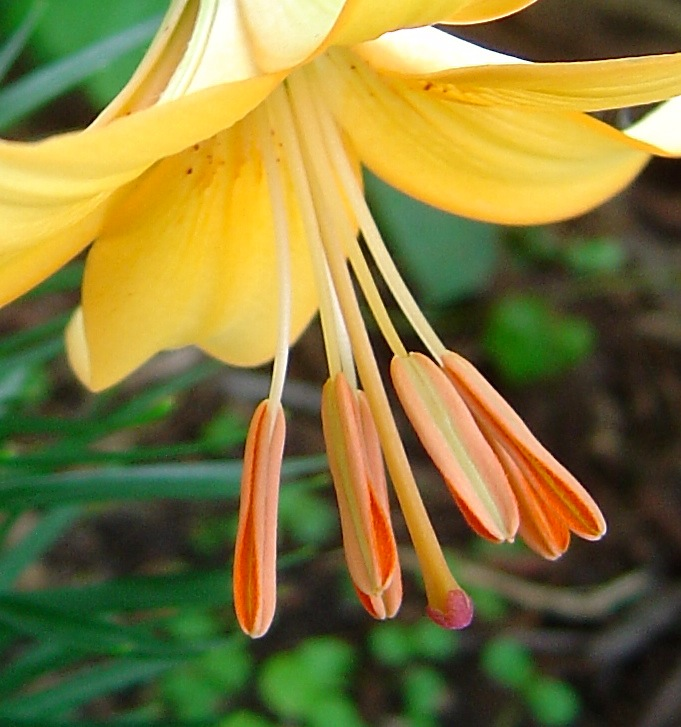
Lilium with longitudinal dehiscence of anthers

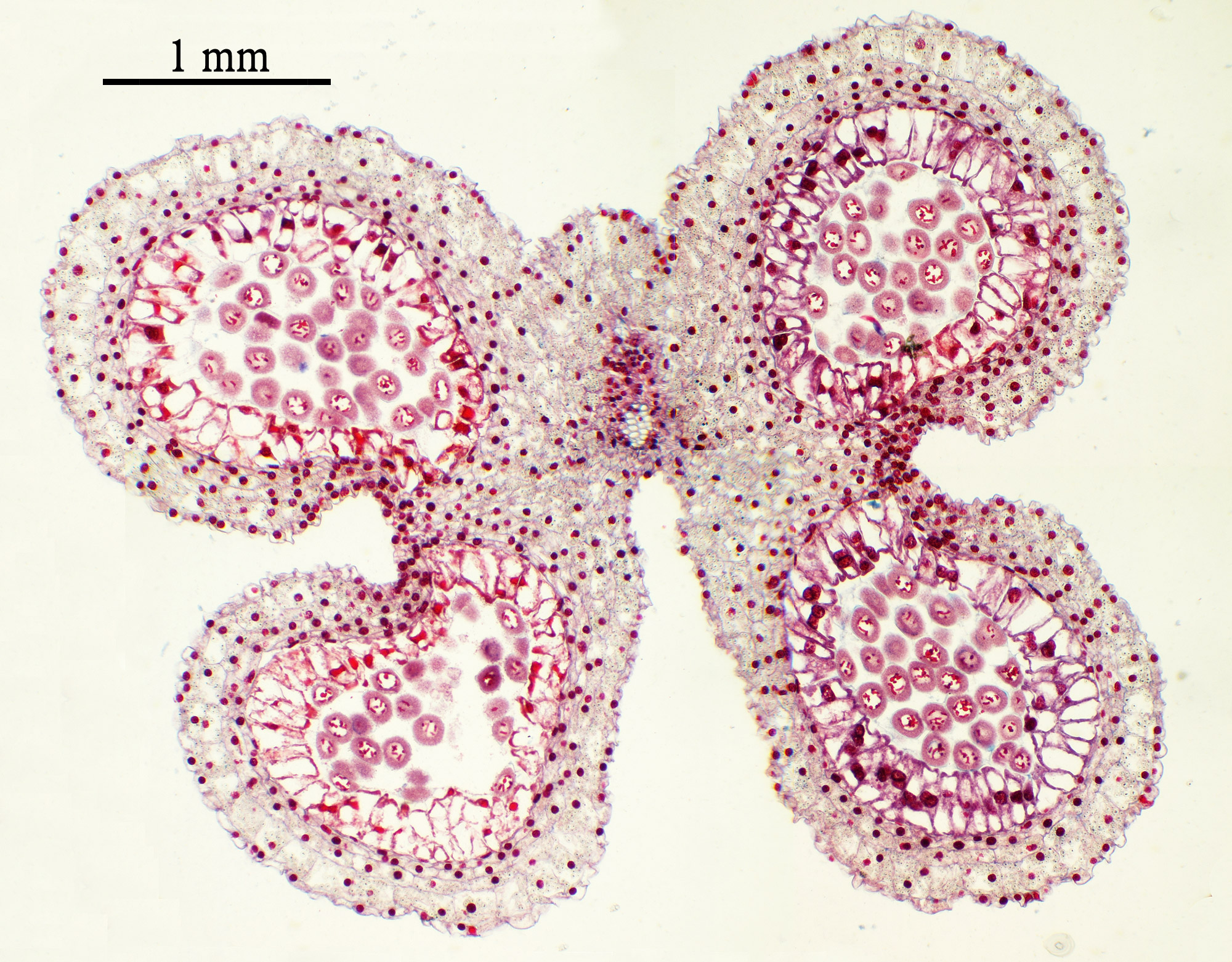
Lilium anthers in cross section

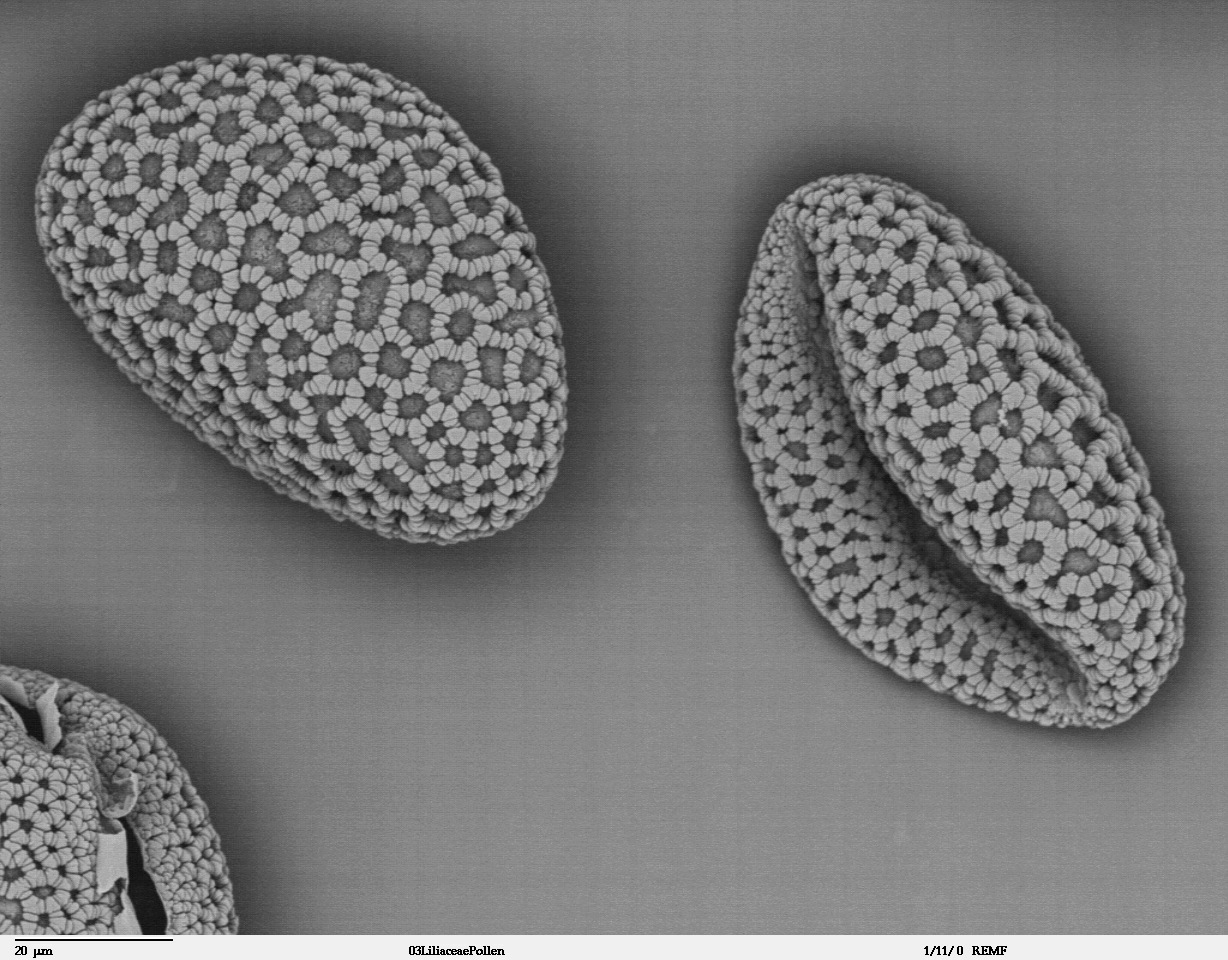
Single-grooved pollen in Lilium auratum

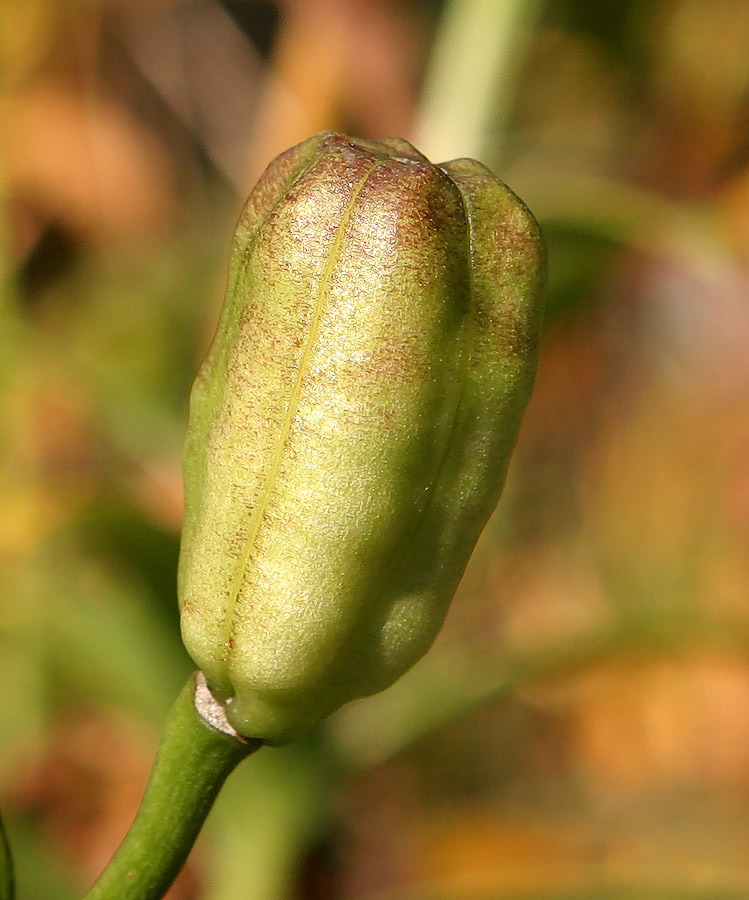
Lillium fruit capsule

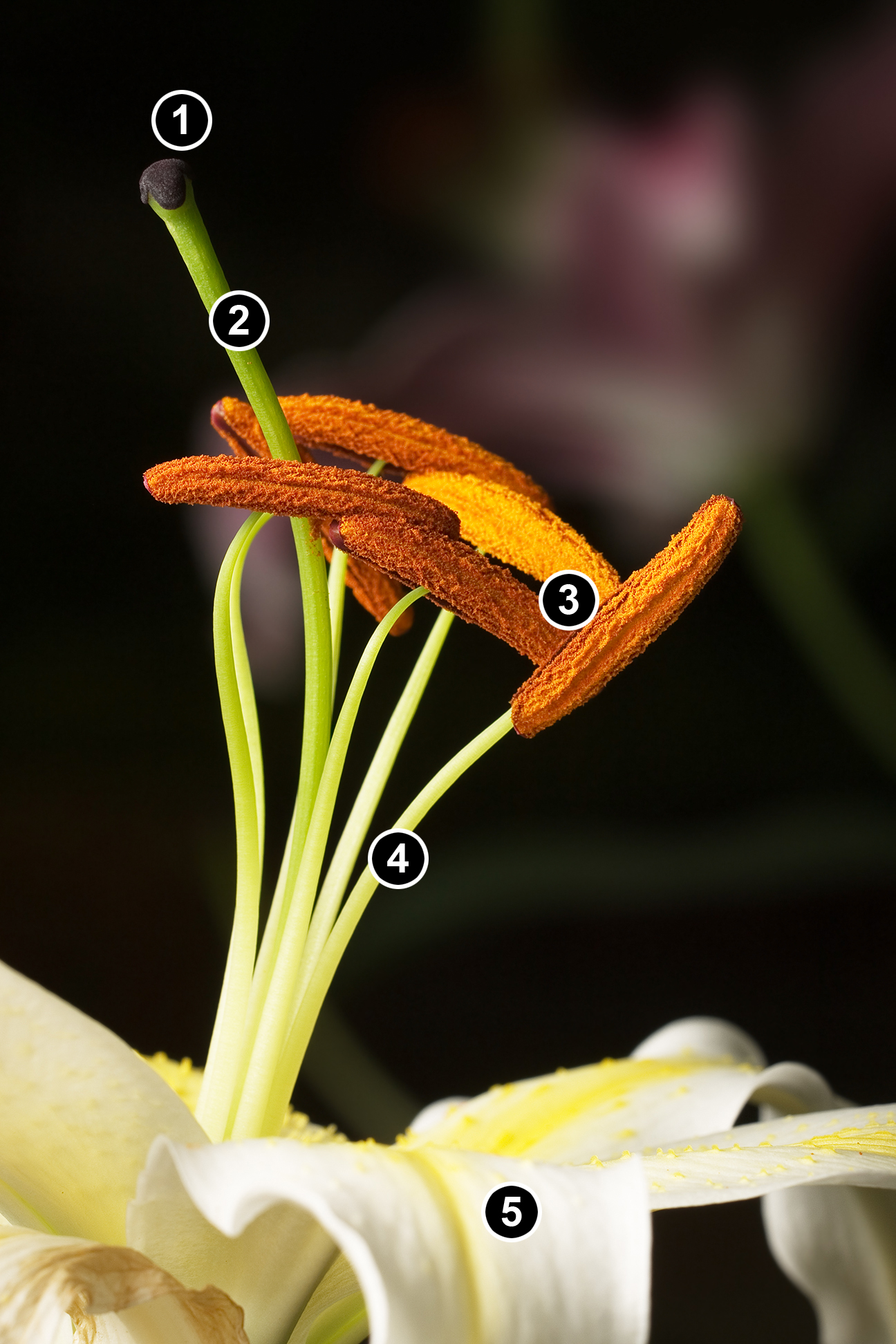
Lilium longiflorum: 1. Stigma, 2. style, 3. stamens, 4. filament, 5. tepal

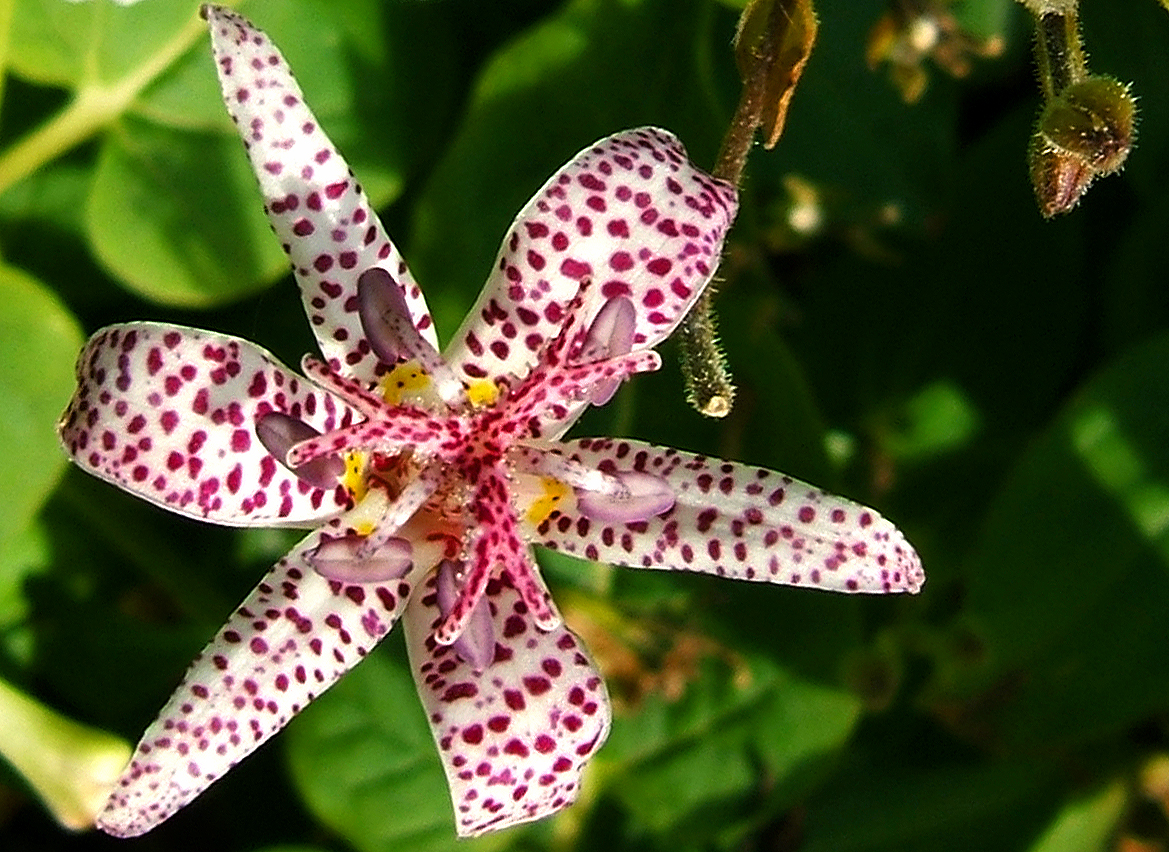
Tricyrtis flower with patterned tepals

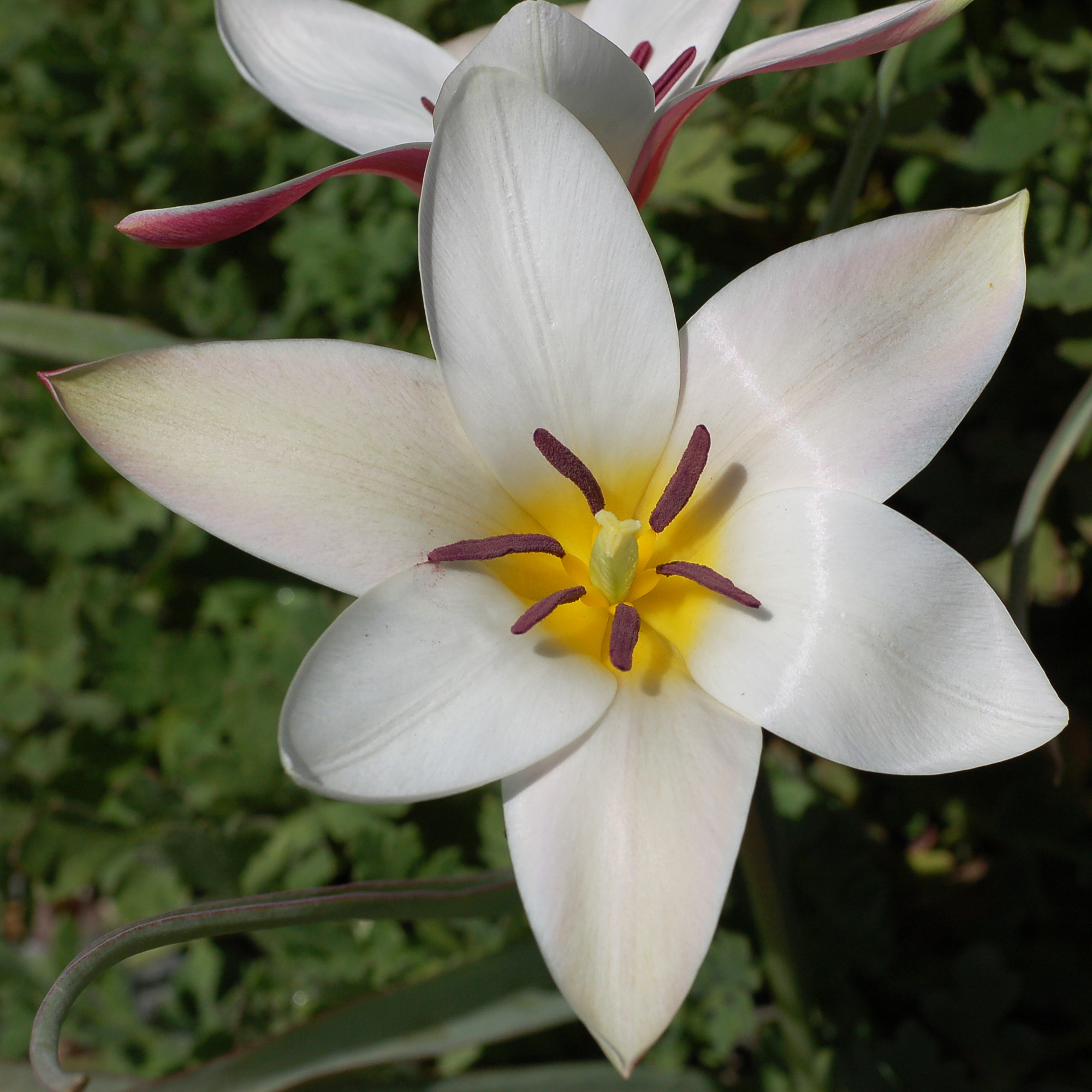
Tulipa clusiana with three sepals resembling petals

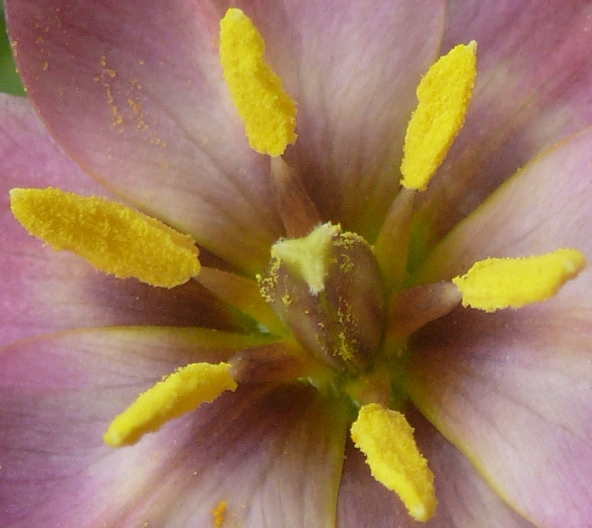
T. humilis flower with multiple fused carpels surrounded by stamens

=== Fruit ===
The fruit is generally a wind-dispersed capsule, but occasionally a berry (Medeoleae) which is dispersed by animals.

A capsule that is usually loculicidal (splitting along the locules) as in the Lilioideae, but occasionally septicidal (splitting between them, along the separating septa) in the Calachortoideae and wind dispersed, although the Medeoleae form berries (baccate). The seeds may be flat, oblong, angular, discoid, ellipsoid or globose (spherical), or compressed with a well developed epidermis. The exterior may be smooth or roughened, with a wing or raphe (ridge), aril or one to two tails, rarely hairy, but may be dull or shiny and the lack of a black integument distinguishes them from related taxa such as Allioideae that were previously included in this family, and striate (parallel longitudinally ridged) in the Steptopoideae. The hilum (scar) is generally inconspicuous. The bitegmic (separate testa and tegmen) seed coat itself may be thin, suberose (like cork), or crustaceous (hard or brittle). The endosperm is abundant, cartilaginous (fleshy) or horny and contains oils and aleurone but not starch (non-farinaceous). Its cells are polyploid (triploid or pentaploid, depending on the embryo sac type). The embryo is small (usually less than one quarter of seed volume), axile (radially sectioned), linear (longer than broad) or rarely rudimentary (tiny relative to endosperm) depending on placentation type, and straight, bent, curved or curled at the upper end.

=== Genome ===
The Liliaceae include a species with one of the largest genome size within the angiosperms, Fritillaria assyriaca (1C=127.4 pg), while Tricyrtis macropoda is as small as 4.25 pg. Chromosome numbers vary by genus. Some genera like Calochortus (x=6-10), Prosartes (6,8,9,11), Scoliopus (7,8), Streptopus (8, 27) and Tricyrtis (12–13) have a small and variable number of chromosomes while subfamily Lilioideae have a larger and more stable chromosome number (12) as have the Medeoleae (7).

=== Phytochemistry ===
The seeds contain saponins but no calcium oxalate raphide crystals, chelidonic acid (unlike Asparagales) or cysteine derived sulphur compounds (allyl sulphides), another distinguishing feature from the characteristic alliaceous odour of the Allioideae. Fritillaria in particular contains steroidal alkaloids of the cevanine and solanum type. Solanidine and solanthrene alkaloids have been isolated from some Fritillaria species. Tulipa contains tulipanin, an anthocyanin.

== Taxonomy ==
The taxonomy of the Liliaceae has a very complex history. The family was first described in the eighteenth century, and over time many other genera were added until it became one of the largest of the monocotyledon families, and also extremely diverse. Modern taxonomic systems, such as the APG which is based on phylogenetic principles using molecular biology, have redistributed many of these genera resulting in the relatively small family that is currently recognised. Consequently, there are many different accounts of the Liliaceae in the literature and older uses of the term occur commonly. To distinguish between them, the Latin terms sensu lato and sensu stricto are frequently used (together with their abbreviations, s.l. and s.s.) to denote the broader or stricter sense of the circumscription respectively, e.g. Liliaceae s.s..

=== History ===
The family Liliaceae was described by Michel Adanson in 1763 and formally named by Antoine Laurent de Jussieu in 1789. Jussieu defined this grouping as having a calyx of six equal colored parts, six stamens, a superior ovary, single style, and a trilocular (three-chambered) capsule. By 1845, John Lindley, the first English systematist, unhappily acknowledged the great diversity in the circumscription of the family, and that it had expanded vastly, with many subdivisions. As he saw it, the Liliaceae were already paraphyletic ("catch-all"), being all Liliales not included in the other families, but hoped that the future would reveal some characteristic that would group them better. He recognized 133 genera and 1200 species. By the time of the next major British classification – that of Bentham and Hooker in 1883 (published in Latin) – several of Lindley's other families had already been absorbed into the Liliaceae. Over time the family became increasingly broad and somewhat arbitrarily defined as all species of plants with six tepals and a superior ovary, eventually coming to encompass about 300 genera and 4,500 species within the order Liliales under the Cronquist system (1981). Cronquist merged the Liliaceae with the Amaryllidaceae, making this one of the largest monocotyledon families.

Many other botanists echoed Lindley's earlier concerns about the phylogeny of the Liliaceae, but various schemes to divide the family gained little traction. Dahlgren (1985) suggested there were in fact forty – not one – families distributed over three orders (predominantly Liliales and Asparagales). In the context of a general review of the classification of angiosperms, the Liliaceae were subjected to more intense scrutiny. Considerable progress in plant phylogeny and phylogenetic theory enabled a phylogenetic tree to be constructed for all of the flowering plants, as elaborated by the Angiosperm Phylogeny Group (1998).

=== Modern APG classification and phylogeny ===
The Angiosperm Phylogeny Group (APG) made rapid progress in establishing a modern monophyletic classification of the flowering plants by 2009. Despite establishing this relative degree of monophyly (genetic homogeneity) for the family Liliaceae, their morphology remains diverse and there exists within the Liliaceae clade or grouping, a number of subclades (subgroups). Particularly enigmatic were Clintonia, Medeola, Scoliopus, and Tricyrtis.

Of the fifteen genera within the Liliaceae, the ten genera of the Lilioideae subfamily form one morphological group that is characterised by contractile bulbs and roots, and a Fritillaria-type embryo-sac (megagametophyte with four megaspores). Within the Lilioideae, Clintonia and the closely related Medeola form a subclade, and are now considered a separate tribe (Medeoleae). The other major grouping consists of the five genera constituting the Streptopoideae (including Scoliopus) and Calochortoideae (including Tricyrtis) subfamilies characterised by creeping rhizomes, styles which are divided at their apices, and by megagametophyte development of the Polygonum-type (a simple megaspore and triploid endosperm) embryo-sac.

=== Evolution and biogeography ===
The development of a phylogenetic approach to taxonomy suggested the Liliales formed some of the earliest monocots. Molecular analysis indicates that divergence amongst the Liliales probably occurred around 82 million years ago. The closest sister family to the Liliaceae are the Smilacaceae, with the Liliaceae separating 52 million years ago. Liliaceae thus arose during the Late Cretaceous to Early Paleogene periods. Major evolutionary clades include the Lilieae (Lilium, Fritillaria, Nomocharis, Cardiocrinum, Notholirion) from the Himalayas about 12 mya and the Tulipeae (Erythronium, Tulipa, Gagea) from East Asia at about the same time. The Medeoleae (Clintonia and Medeola) may have appeared in North America but were subsequently dispersed, as may have the Streptopoideae and Calochortoideae. Liliaceae fossils have been dated to the Paleogene and Cretaceous eras in the Antarctic.

The Liliaceae probably arose as shade plants, with subsequent evolution to open areas including deciduous forest in the more open autumnal period, but then a return of some species (e.g. Cardiocrinum). This was accompanied by a shift from rhizomes to bulbs, to more showy flowers, the production of capsular fruit and narrower parallel-veined leaves. Again, some reversal to the broader reticulate-veined leaves occurred (e.g. Cardiocrinum).

=== Subdivisions and genera ===
Examples of the four subdivisions

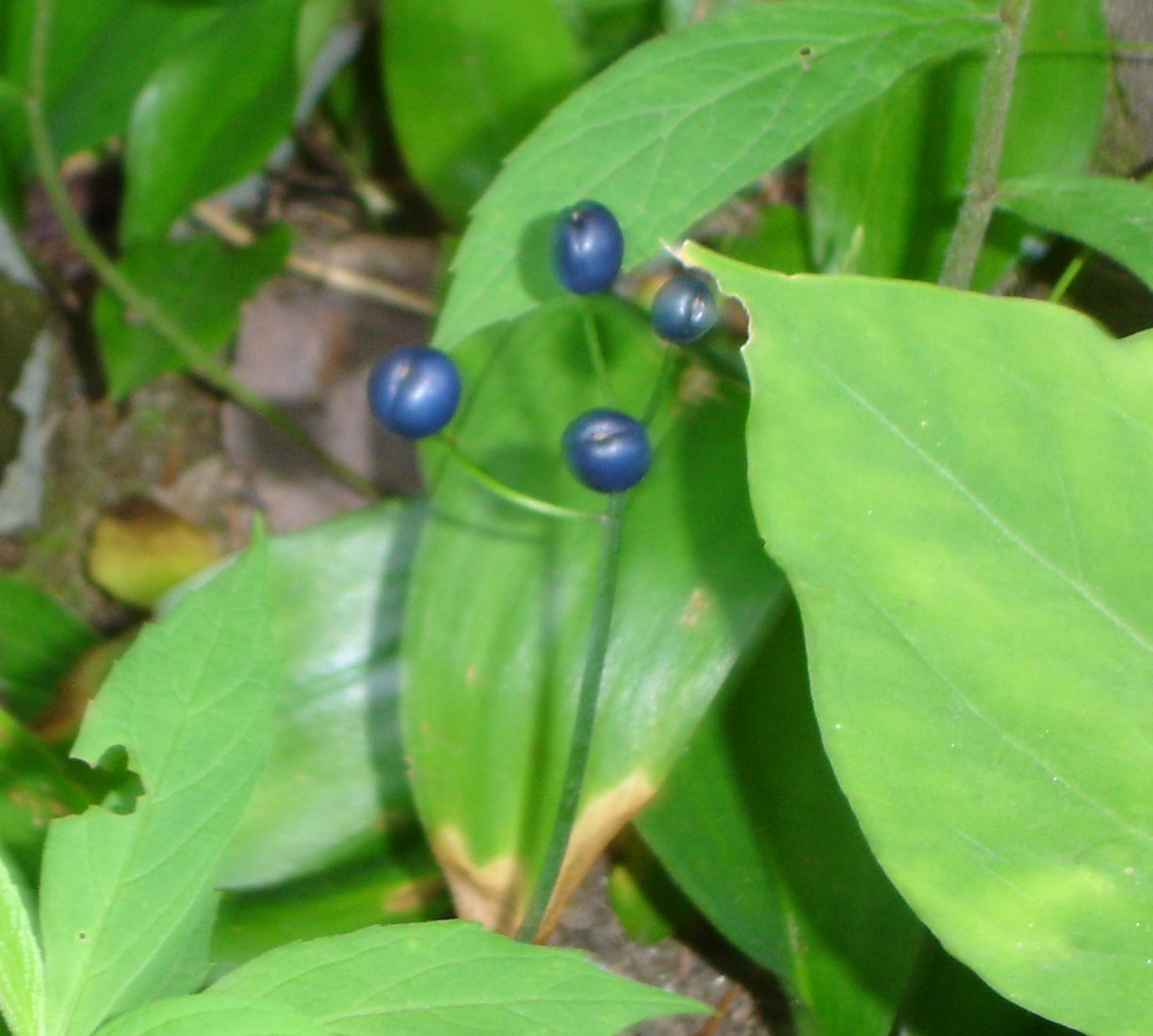
Medeoleae: Leaves and fruit of Clintonia borealis, Quebec

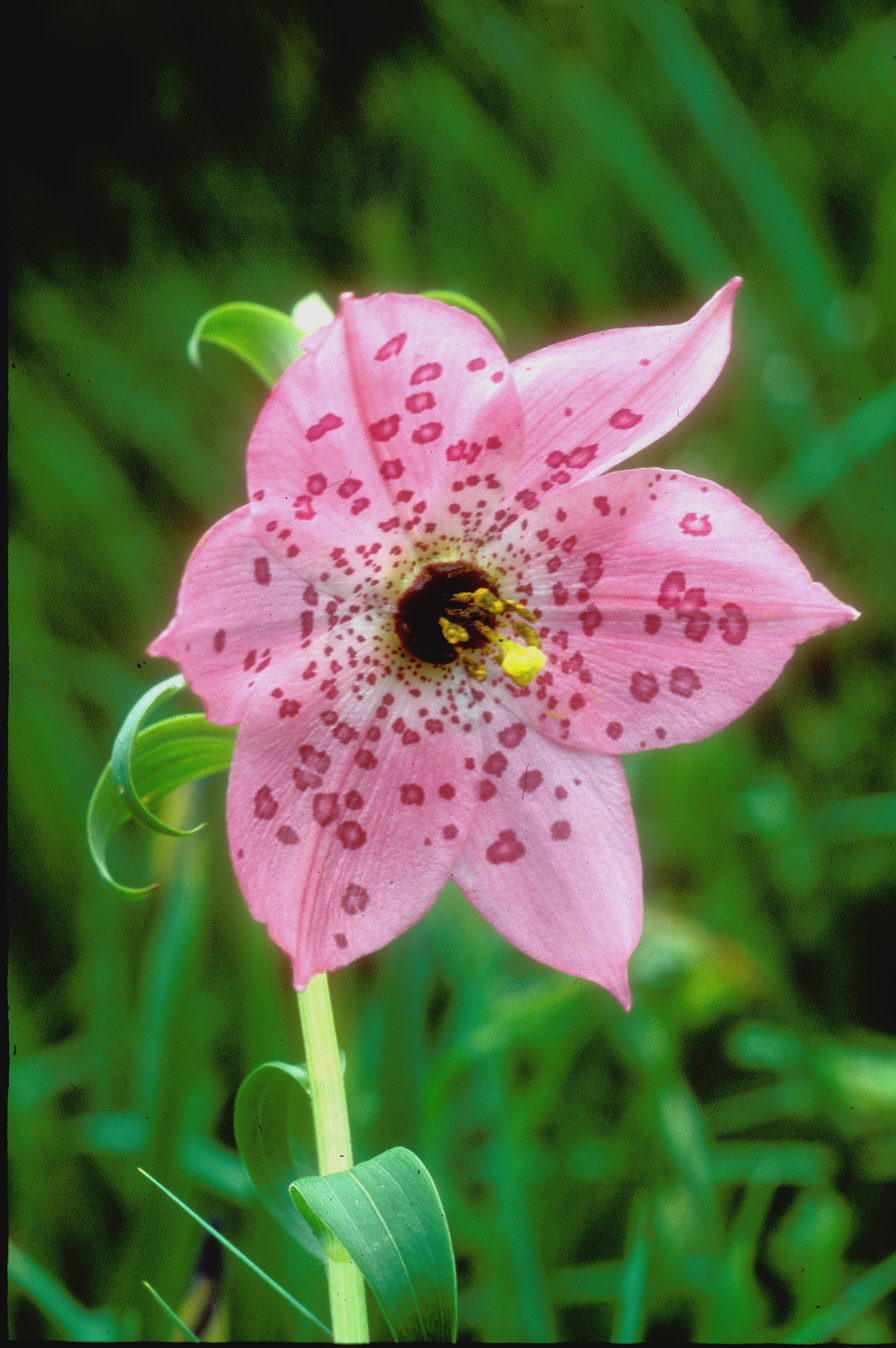
Lilieae: Flower of Nomocharis aperta, Yunnan, China

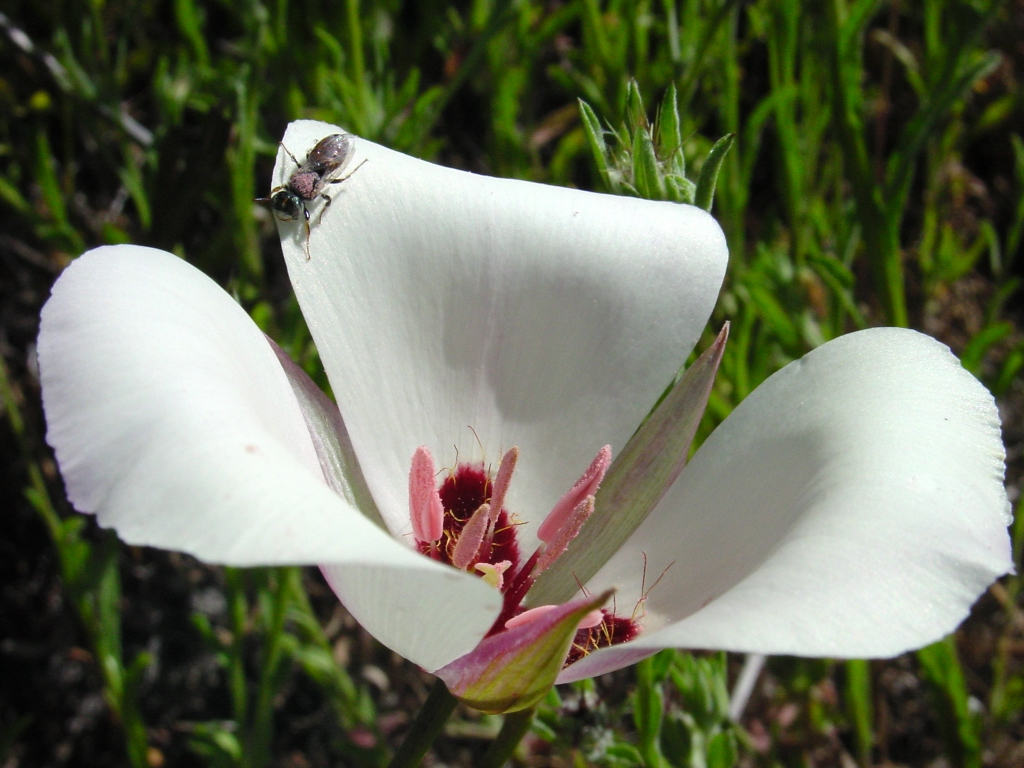
Calochortoideae: Flower of Calochortus catalinae, California

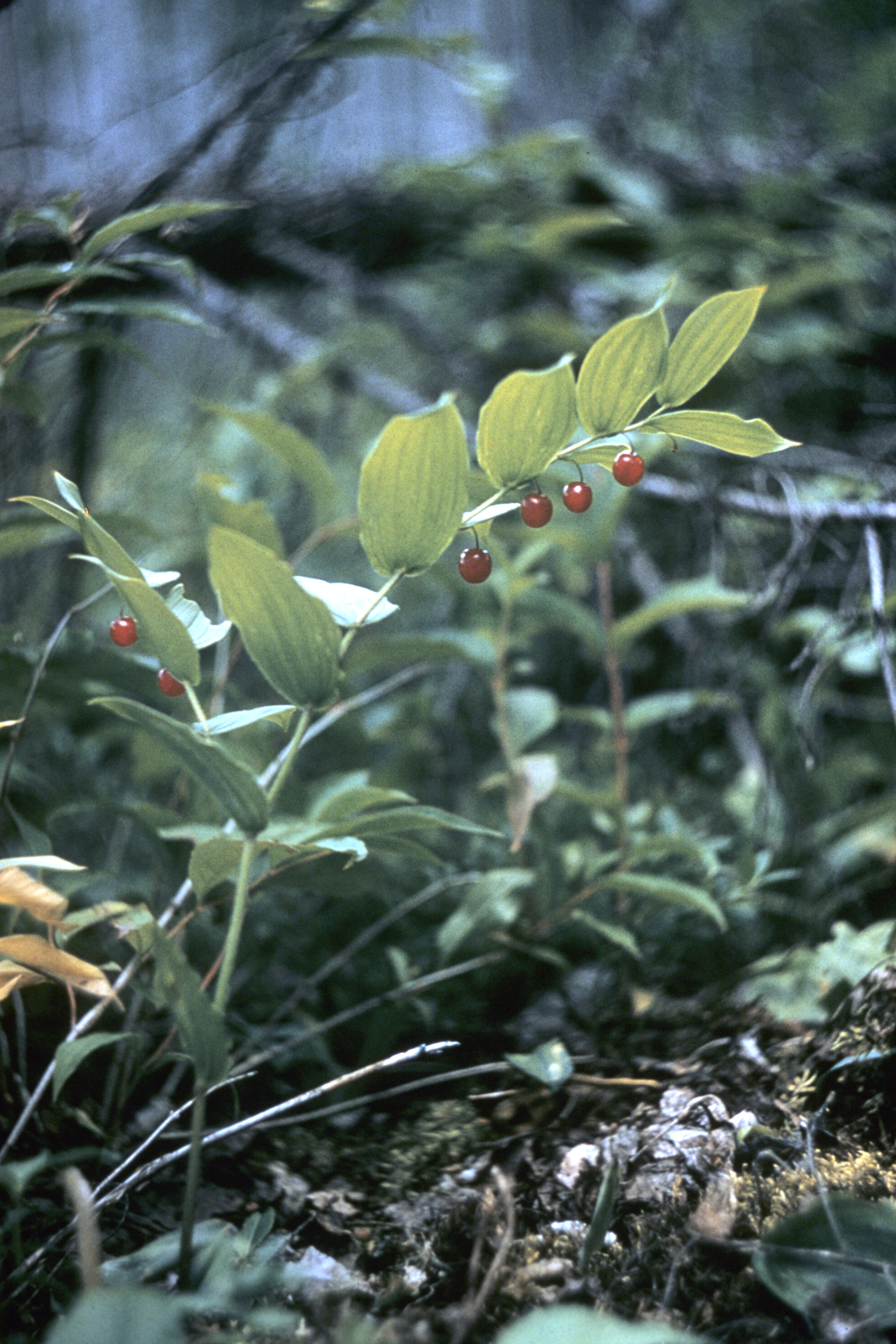
Streptopoideae: Leaves and berries of Streptopus lanceolatus, Ontario

==== Suprageneric subdivisions ====
Due to the diversity of the originally broadly defined Liliaceae s.l., many attempts have been made to form suprageneric classifications, e.g. subfamilies and tribes. Classifications published since the use of molecular methods in phylogenetics have taken a narrower view of the Liliaceae (Liliaceae s.s.). The Angiosperm Phylogeny Website (APweb) recognizes three subfamilies, one of which is divided into two tribes.

==== Genera ====
Various authorities (e.g. ITIS 16, GRIN 27, WCSP, NCBI, DELTA) differ on the exact number of genera included in Liliaceae s.s., but generally there are about fifteen to sixteen genera, depending on whether or not Amana is included in Tulipa and Lloydia in Gagea.

Currently the APWeb lists fifteen genera, arranged as shown in this table:

APweb Distribution of subfamilies, tribes and genera of Liliaceae
Subfamily	Tribe	Genus
Lilioideae Eaton	Medeoleae Benth. (synonyms: Medeolaceae Takht., Medeoloideae Benth.)	Clintonia Raf. - bead lilies
Lilioideae Eaton	Medeoleae Benth. (synonyms: Medeolaceae Takht., Medeoloideae Benth.)	Medeola Gronov. ex L. - Indian cucumber-root
Lilioideae Eaton	Lilieae Ritgen (synonyms: Erythroniaceae Martinov, Fritillariaceae Salisb., Liriaceae Borkh., Tulipaceae Borkh.)|	Amana Honda
Lilioideae Eaton	Lilieae Ritgen (synonyms: Erythroniaceae Martinov, Fritillariaceae Salisb., Liriaceae Borkh., Tulipaceae Borkh.)|	Cardiocrinum (Endl.) Lindl. - giant lilies
Lilioideae Eaton	Lilieae Ritgen (synonyms: Erythroniaceae Martinov, Fritillariaceae Salisb., Liriaceae Borkh., Tulipaceae Borkh.)|	Erythronium L. – trout lily
Lilioideae Eaton	Lilieae Ritgen (synonyms: Erythroniaceae Martinov, Fritillariaceae Salisb., Liriaceae Borkh., Tulipaceae Borkh.)|	Fritillaria Tourn. ex L. – fritillary or mission bells
Lilioideae Eaton	Lilieae Ritgen (synonyms: Erythroniaceae Martinov, Fritillariaceae Salisb., Liriaceae Borkh., Tulipaceae Borkh.)|	Gagea Salisb. (including Lloydia Salisb. ex Rchb.) – yellow star-of-Bethlehem
Lilioideae Eaton	Lilieae Ritgen (synonyms: Erythroniaceae Martinov, Fritillariaceae Salisb., Liriaceae Borkh., Tulipaceae Borkh.)|	Lilium Tourn. ex L. (synonym Nomocharis Franch.) – lily
Lilioideae Eaton	Lilieae Ritgen (synonyms: Erythroniaceae Martinov, Fritillariaceae Salisb., Liriaceae Borkh., Tulipaceae Borkh.)|	Notholirion Wall. ex Boiss.
Lilioideae Eaton	Lilieae Ritgen (synonyms: Erythroniaceae Martinov, Fritillariaceae Salisb., Liriaceae Borkh., Tulipaceae Borkh.)|	Tulipa L. – tulip
Calochortoideae Dumort. (synonyms: Calochortaceae Dumort., Compsoaceae Horan., nom. illeg., Tricyrtidaceae Takht., nom. cons.)		Calochortus Pursh - mariposa, globe lilies
Calochortoideae Dumort. (synonyms: Calochortaceae Dumort., Compsoaceae Horan., nom. illeg., Tricyrtidaceae Takht., nom. cons.)		Tricyrtis Wall. – toad lily
Streptopoideae (synonym: Scoliopaceae Takht.)		Prosartes D.Don – drops of gold
Streptopoideae (synonym: Scoliopaceae Takht.)		Scoliopus Torr. – fetid adder's tongue
Streptopoideae (synonym: Scoliopaceae Takht.)		Streptopus Michx. – twistedstalk

The largest genera are Gagea (200), Fritillaria (130), Lilium (110), and Tulipa (75 species), all within the tribe Lilieae.

=== Etymology and pronunciation ===
The name "Liliaceae" (English: /ˌlɪliˈeɪsi, -siˌaɪ, -siˌeɪ, -siˌi/) comes to international scientific vocabulary from Neo-Latin, from Lilium, the type genus, + -aceae, a standardized suffix for plant family names in modern taxonomy. The genus name comes from the Classical Latin word lilium, "lily", which in turn came from the Greek leírion (λείριον).

Because of the history of Liliaceae, many species such as Watsonia (bugle lily) that were previously classified in this family bear the name 'lily' but are neither part of the genus Lilium, or the family Liliaceae.

== Distribution and habitat ==
The Liliaceae are widely distributed, but mainly in the temperate regions of the Northern Hemisphere. The centre of diversity is from southwest Asia to China. Their distribution is diverse, mainly in plains, steppes, and alpine meadows, but also in deciduous forests, Mediterranean scrub and arctic tundra. Tulipa and Gagea provide examples of ornamental geophyte biomorphological types representing continental thermoperiodic zones (Irano-Turanian region), characterised by cessation of underground growth at high temperatures in early summer and requiring low winter temperatures for spring flowering. While some genera are shade-dwelling, such as the Medeoleae, and Streptopoideae, Tricyrtis, and Cardiocrinum, others prefer a more open habitat.

== Ecology ==
The Liliaceae are ecologically diverse. Species of Liliaceae bloom at various times from spring to late summer. The colorful flowers produce large amounts of nectar and pollen that attract insects which pollinate them (entomophily), particularly bees and wasps (hymenopterophily), butterflies (psychophily) and moths (phalaenophily). The seeds are dispersed by wind and water. Some species (e.g. Scoliopus, Erythronium and Gagea) have seeds with an aril structure that are dispersed by ants (myrmecochory).

The proliferation of deer populations in many areas, due to human factors such as the elimination of their animal predators and introduction to alien environments, is placing considerable herbivory pressure on many of the family's species. Fences as high as 8 feet may be required to prevent them from consuming the plants, an impractical solution for most wild areas. Those of the genus Lilium are particularly palatable, while species in Fritillaria are repellant.

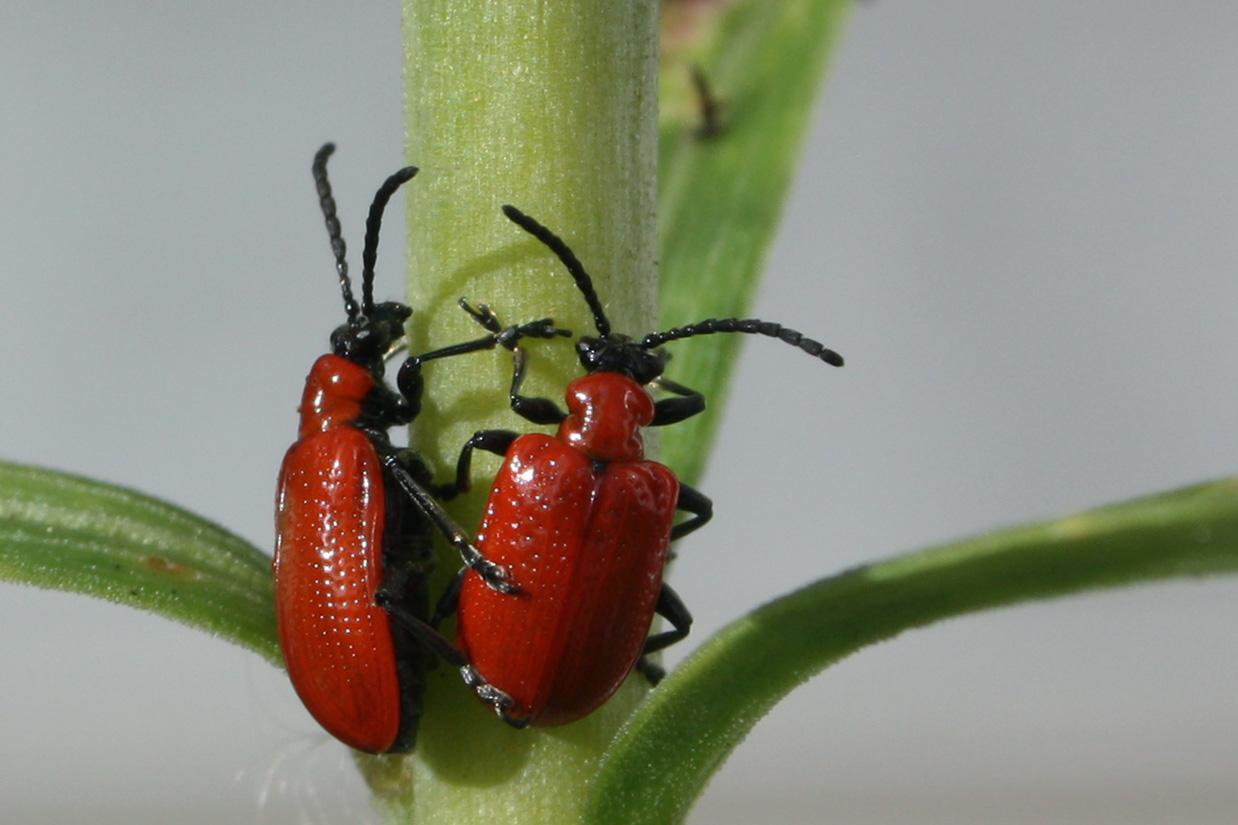
Scarlet lily beetle (Lilioceris lilii)

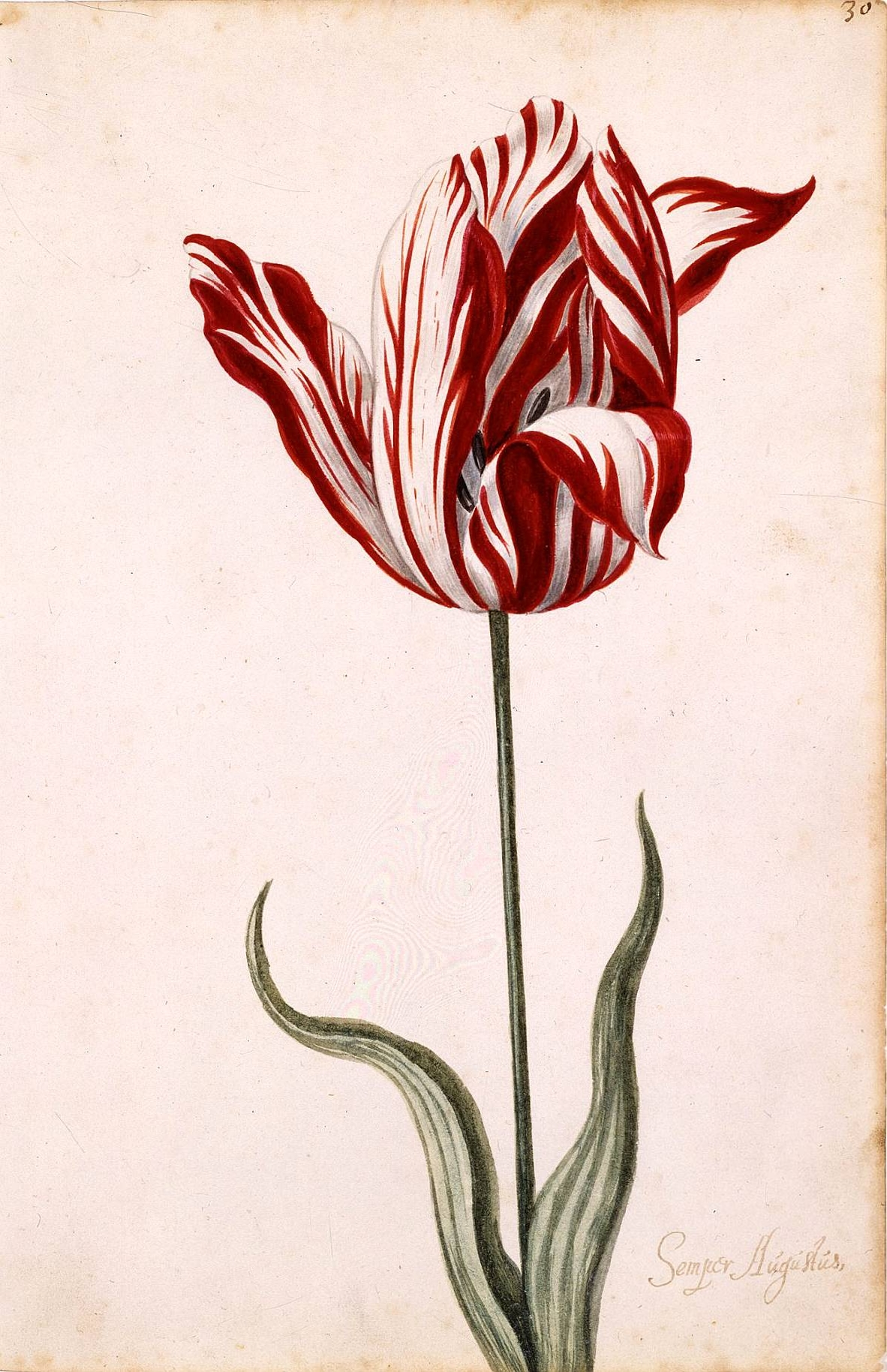
17th-century painting of affected Tulipa 'Semper Augustus', showing 'breaking'

=== Pests and predators ===
Liliaceae are subject to a wide variety of diseases and pests, including insects, such as thrips, aphids, beetles and flies. Also fungi, viruses and vertebrate animals such as mice and deer. An important horticultural and garden pest is the scarlet lily beetle (Japanese red lily beetle, Lilioceris lilii) and other Lilioceris species which attack Fritillaria and Lilium. Lilium species may be food plants for the Cosmia trapezina moth. A major pest of Tulips is the fungus, Botrytis tulipae.

Both Lilium and Tulipa are susceptible to a group of five viruses of the family Potyviridae, specifically the potyvirus (named for potato virus Y) group, which includes the tulip-breaking virus (TBV) and the lily streak virus (lily mottle virus, LMoV) resulting in 'breaking' of the color of the flowers. The viruses are transmitted by aphids. This breaking effect was of economic importance during the tulip mania of the seventeenth century, because it appeared to be producing new varieties. In modern times tulip breeders have produced varieties that mimic the effect of the virus, without being infected. One of these varieties is known as 'Rembrandt', after the Dutch artist of that name. Contemporary tulip owners commonly had Rembrandt and other artists paint their flowers to preserve them for posterity, hence the 'broken' tulips were known as Rembrandt tulips at that time. Another modern variety is 'Princess Irene'. One of the tulip breaking viruses is also named the Rembrandt tulip-breaking virus (ReTBV).

== Cultivation ==
Cultivation

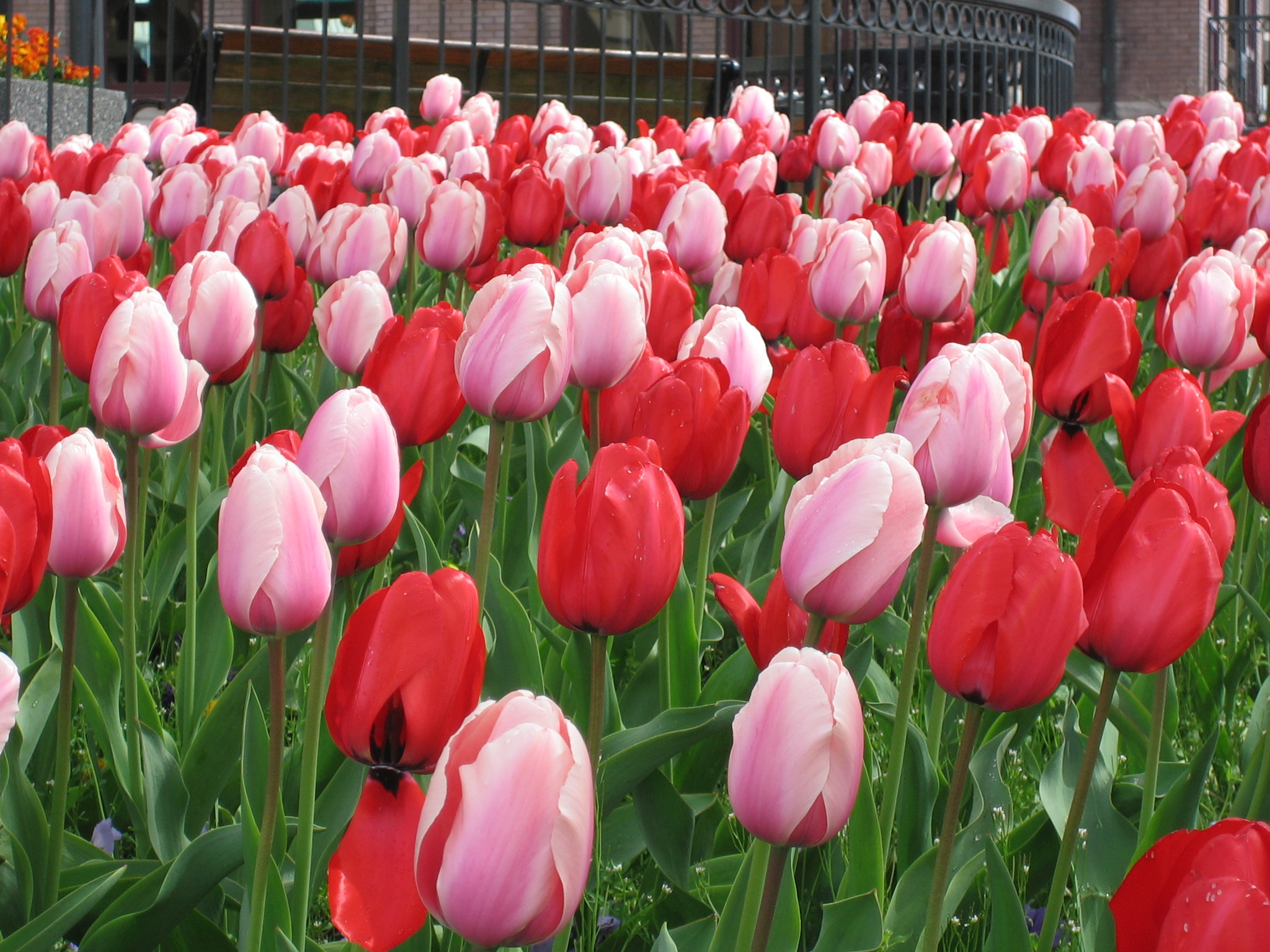
Tulipa varieties are popular ornamentals

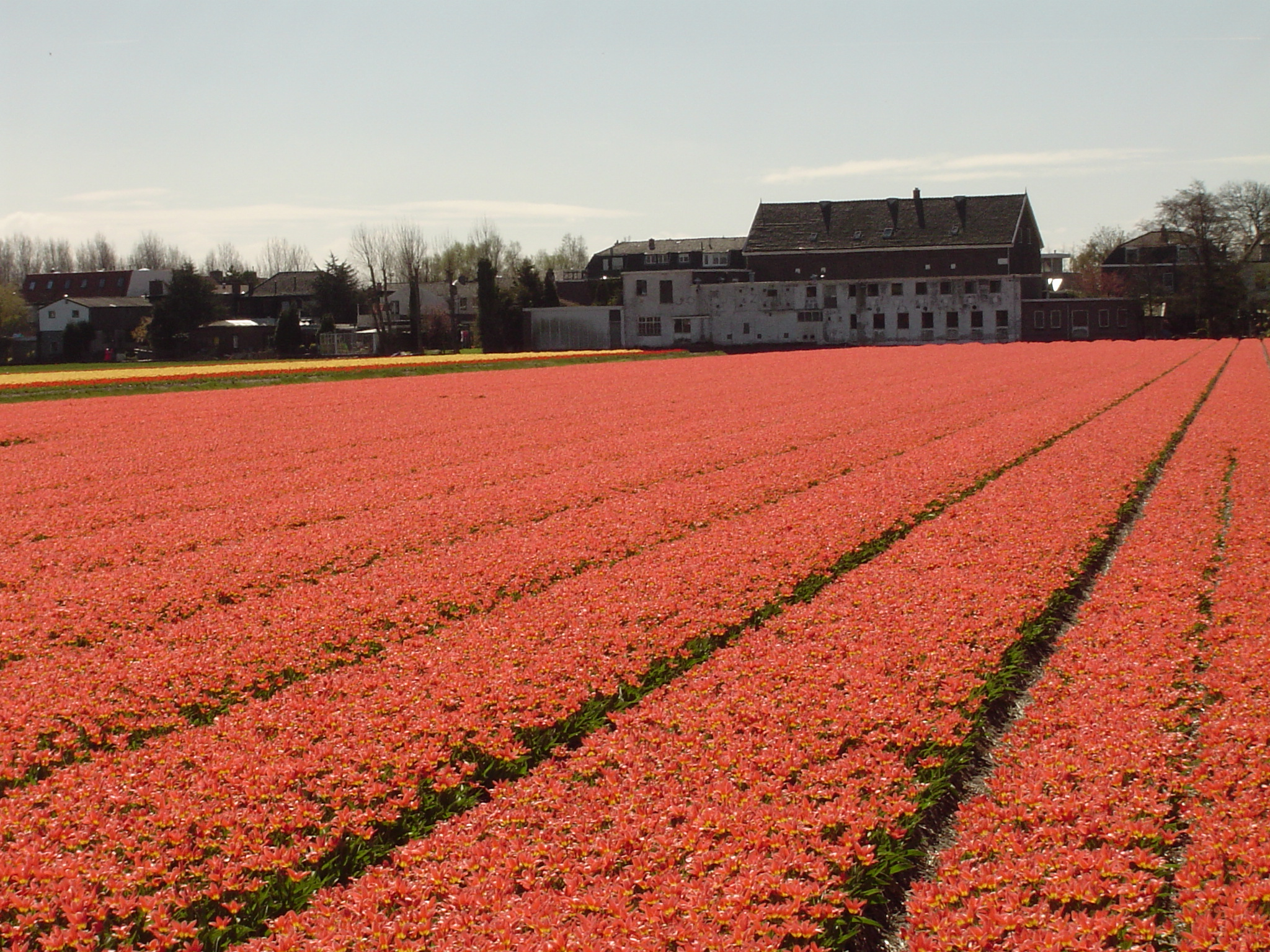
Tulip production, Hillegom, the Netherlands

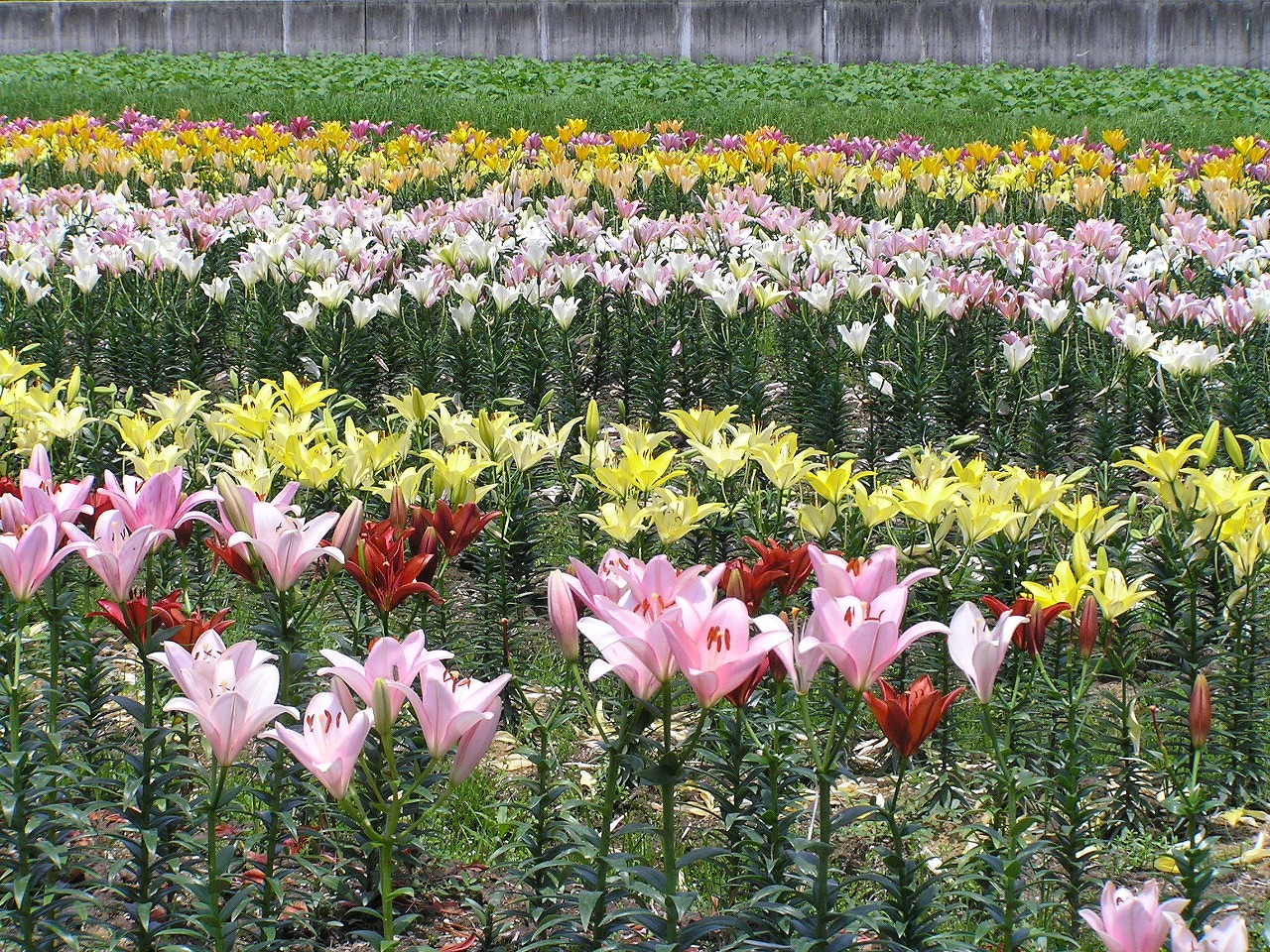
Lily production, Japan

=== Floriculture ===
Many species of Lilieae (in genera Tulipa, Fritillaria, Lilium, and Erythronium) and Calochortoideae (Calochortus and Tricyrtis) are grown as ornamental plants worldwide. Within these genera a wide range of cultivars have been developed by breeding and hybridisation. They are generally used in outdoor gardens and other displays, although in common with many bulbous flowering plants they are often induced to bloom indoors, particularly during the winter months. They also form a significant part of the cut flower market, in particular Tulipa and Lilium.

==== Tulips ====
Tulips have been cultivated since at least the tenth century in Persia. Tulip production has two main markets: cut flowers and bulbs. The latter are used, in turn, to meet the demand for bulbs for parks, gardens, and home use and, secondly, to provide the necessary bulbs for cut flower production. International trade in cut flowers has an approximate total value of 11 billion euros, which provides an indication of the economic importance of this activity. The main producer of tulip bulbs is the Netherlands, a country that accounts for 87% of the global cultivated area, with approximately 12,000 hectares. Other leading producers include Japan, France and Poland. Approximately ten other countries produce commercial tulips, largely for the domestic market. By contrast, the Netherlands is the leading international producer, to the extent of 4 billion bulbs per annum. Of these, 53% are used for the cut flower market and the remainder for the dry bulb market. Of the cut flowers, 57% are used for the domestic market in the Netherlands and the remainder exported.

Original Tulipa species can be obtained for ornamental purposes, such as T. tarda and T. turkestanica. These are referred to as species, or botanical, tulips, and tend to be smaller plants but better at naturalising than the cultivated forms. Breeding programs have produced a wide range of tulip types, enabling blooming through a much longer season by creating early, mid- and late spring varieties. Fourteen distinct types are available in addition to botanical tulips, including Lily-flowered, Fringed, Viridiflora, and Rembrandt. In addition to blooming season, tulip varieties differ in shape and height, and exhibit a wide range of colours, both pure and in combination.

==== Lilies ====
The largest area of production is also the Netherlands, with 76% of the global cultivated area, followed by France, Chile, Japan, the United States, New Zealand and Australia. Approximately ten countries produce lilies commercially altogether. About half of the commercial production is for cut flowers. Many of these countries export bulbs as well as supplying the domestic market. The Netherlands produces about 2,200 million lily bulbs annually, of which 96% is used domestically and the remainder exported, principally within the European Union. One particularly important crop is the production of Lilium longiflorum, whose white flowers are associated with purity and Easter.

Although many Lilium species such as L. martagon and L. candidum can be obtained commercially, the majority of commercially available lilies are the products of a hybridisation program, which has resulted in a separate horticultural classification, including such groupings as Asian, Oriental and Orienpet. In addition to a wide variety of heights, lilies can be obtained in many colours and combinations of colours, and if properly selected can produce an extensive blooming season from early summer to autumn.

==== Other ====
A variety of Fritillaria species are used as early spring ornamental flowers. These vary from the large F. imperialis (crown imperial) available in a number of colours such as yellow or orange, to much smaller species such as F. meleagris or F. uva-vulpis with their chequered patterns. Erythronium is less common but a popular cultivar is 'Pagoda' with its sulphur yellow flowers. Calochortus (mariposa lily) may be sold as a mixture or as cultivars.

=== Propagation ===
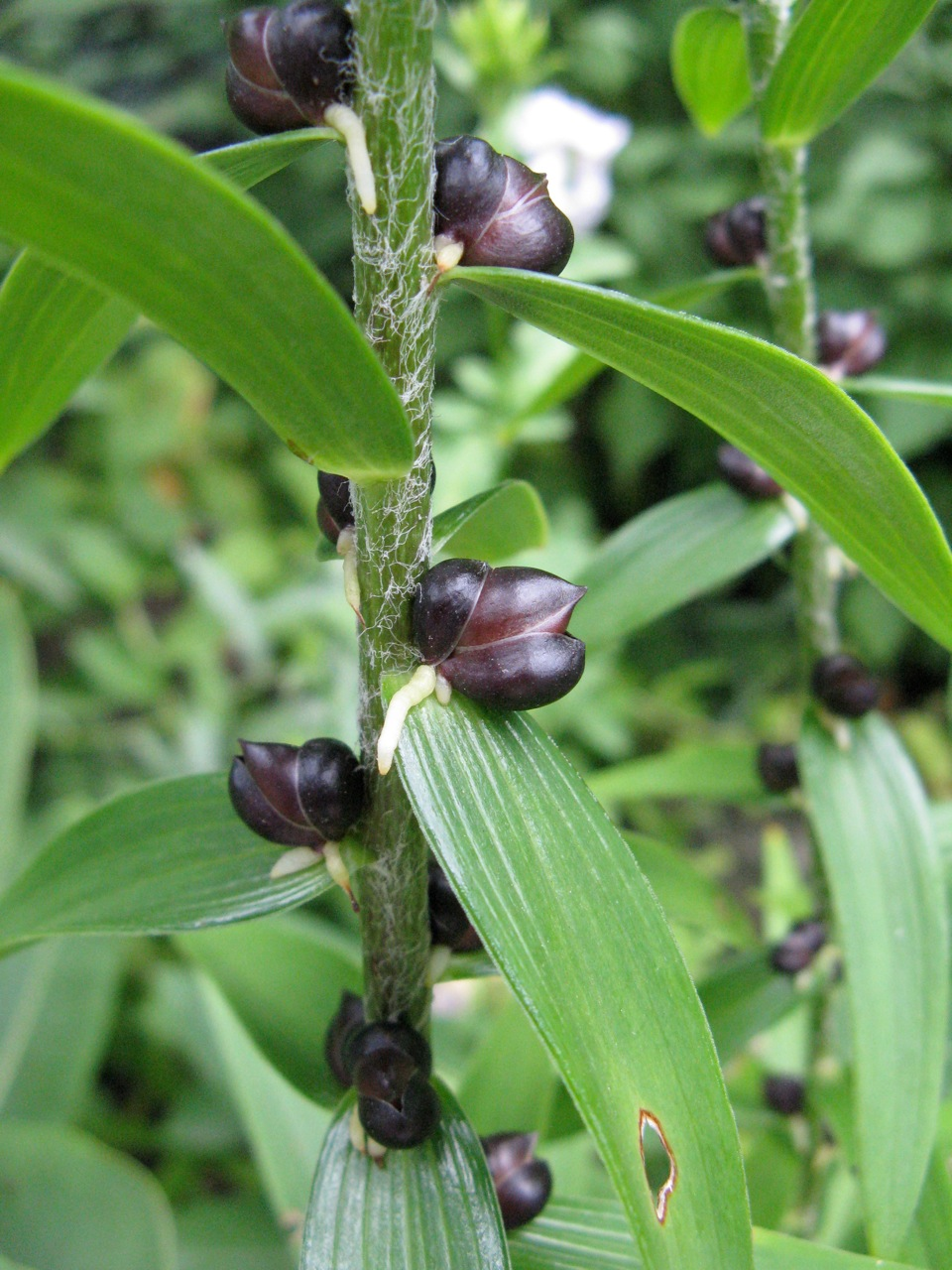
Bulbils in the leaf axils of Lilium lancifolium

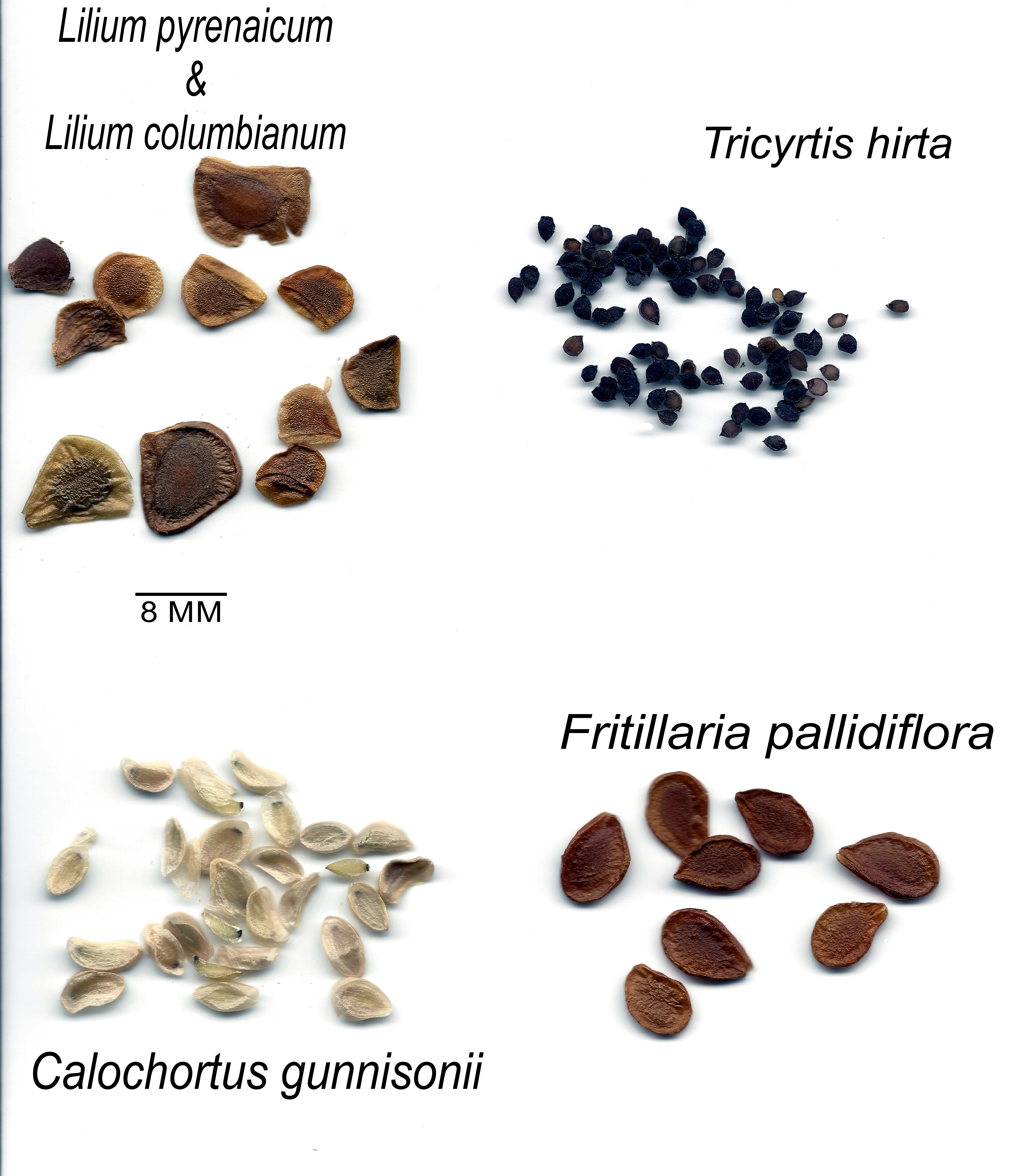
Seeds of Liliaceae species

Methods of propagation include both sexual and asexual reproduction. Commercial cultivars are usually sterile.

==== Sexual reproduction ====
Seeds can be used for propagation of the plant or to create hybrids and can take five to eight years to produce flowering plants. Since interspecific cross-pollination occurs, overlapping wild populations can create natural hybrids.

==== Asexual reproduction ====
- Bulb offsets: Daughter bulbs that form on the mother bulb and can be detached.
- Micropropagation techniques including tissue culture.
- Bulbils, which are adventitious bulbs formed on the parent plant's stem.
- Scaling and twin-scaling, used to increase production in slower-growing varieties, in which multiple whole scales are detached from a single bulb.

Bulb offsets and tissue culture produce genetic clones of the parent plant and thus maintaining genetic integrity of the cultivars. Bulb offsets usually require at least a year before flowering. Commercially, plants may be propagated in vitro and then planted out to grow into plants large enough to sell.

== Toxicity ==
While members of the Liliaceae s.s. have been used as food sources in humans, the bulbs of some species are poisonous to household pets (bulb toxicosis) if eaten and may cause serious complications, such as kidney failure in cats from Lilies, particularly Lilium longiflorum (Easter Lily). Dogs may develop less serious effects such as gastrointestinal problems and central nervous system depression. Most Fritillaria (e.g. F. imperialis, F. meleagris) bulbs contain poisonous neurotoxic alkaloids such as imperialin (peiminine), which may be deadly if ingested in quantity, while other species such as Fritillaria camschatcensis and Fritillaria affinis are edible. Tulips can cause skin irritation due to the presence of tuliposides and tulipalins, which are also found in the flowers, leaves and stems of Fritillaria. These are also toxic to a variety of animals.

== Uses ==
Fritillaria extracts are used in traditional Chinese medicine under the name chuan bei mu, and in Latin, bulbus fritillariae cirrhosae. The bulbs of Fritillaria roylei have been used as antipyretics and expectorants. Lilium bulbs, particularly Lanzhou lily (Lilium davidii) are used as food in China and other parts of Asia. Calochortus bulbs were eaten by Native Americans and as a famine food by Mormon settlers. During World War II, starvation conditions in the Netherlands (Hongerwinter, hunger winter 1944) led to Tulipa bulbs being used as food. Other members of the family used for food include Clintonia (leaves), Medeola (roots), Erythronium (corms), and Fritillaria (bulbs).

== Culture ==
=== Lilies ===
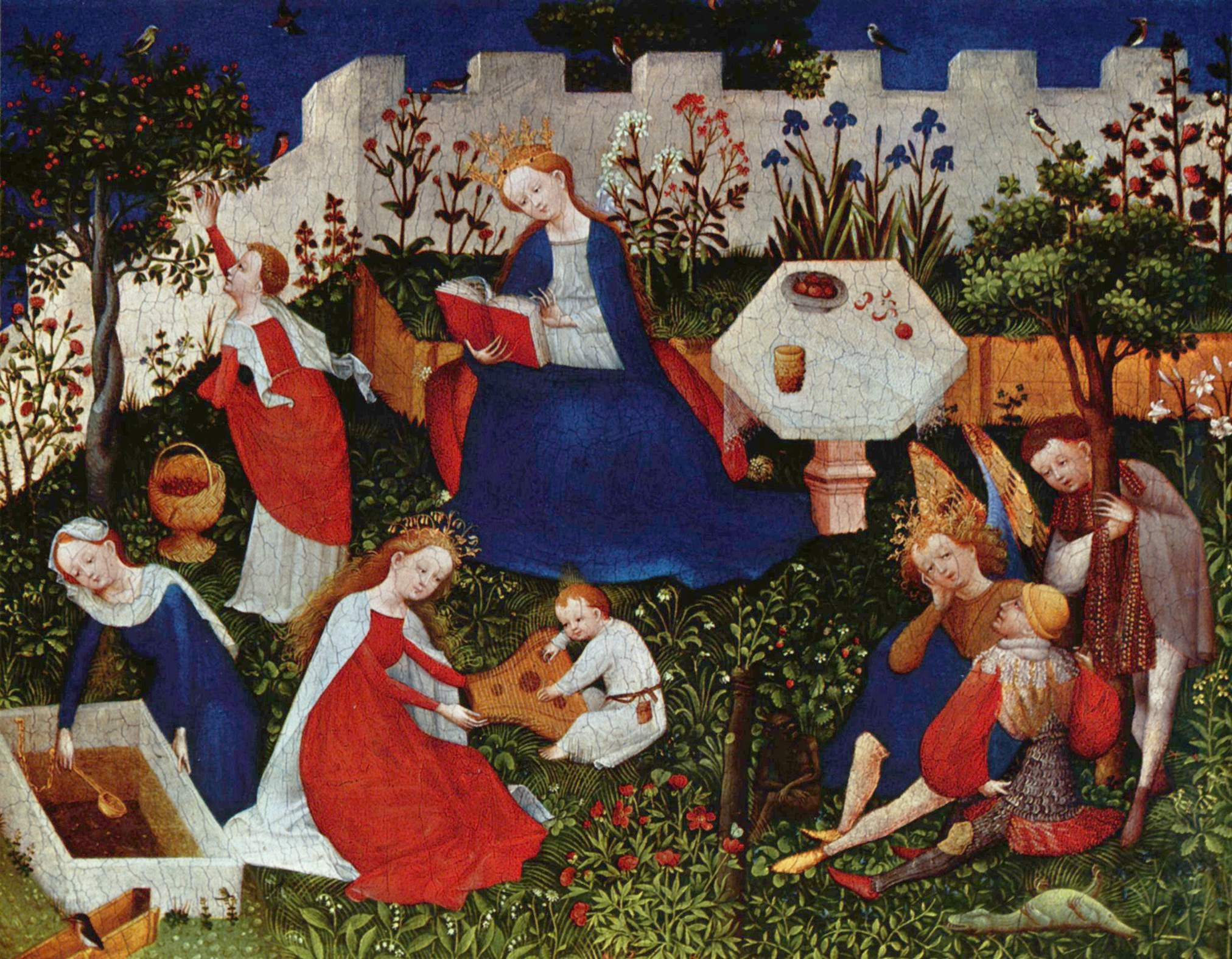
Lilies (far right) growing in the Paradiesgärtlein, Meister des Frankfurter Paradiesgärtleins c. 1410

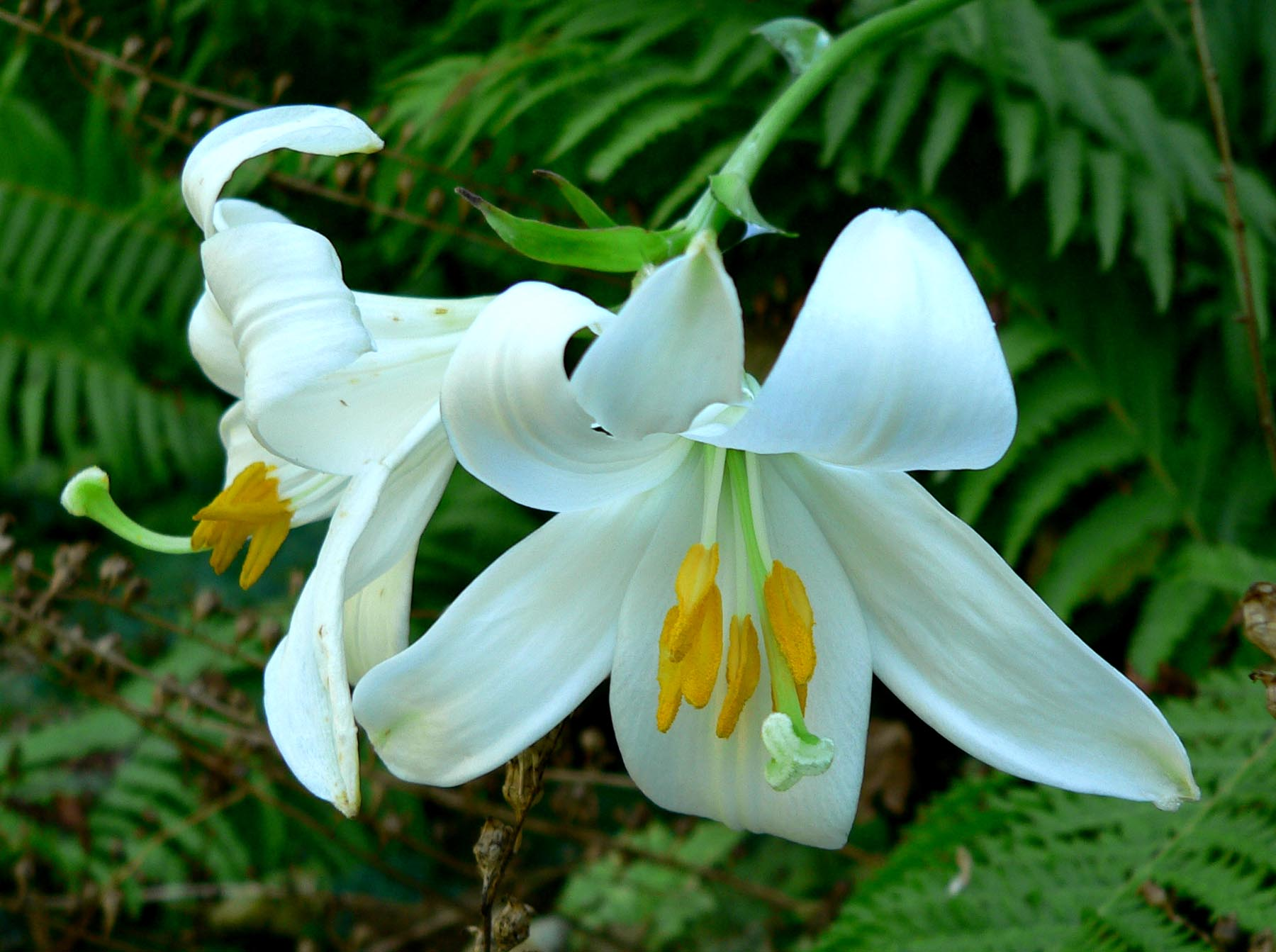
Lilium candidum (Madonna lily)

The type genus, Lilium (the lily), has a long history in literature and art, and a tradition of symbolism as well as becoming a popular female name, and a floral emblem, particularly of France (fleur-de-lis). The cultivation of lilies has been described since at least the ninth century, when Charlemagne ordered it to be grown at his imperial palaces. However, the name 'lily' has historically been applied to a wide variety of plants other than the genus Lilium.

The lily appears in ancient literature associated with both sovereignty and virginal innocence, and is mentioned on a number of occasions in the Bible, such as the description in Solomon's Song of Songs (2, 1–2) "I am a rose of Sharon, a lily of the valleys. Like a lily among thorns is my darling among the young women" or the Gospel of Mathew (6, 28) "Consider the lilies of the field, how they grow; they toil not, neither do they spin" to represent beauty. Artistic representations can be found as far back as frescos from the second century BC, at Amnisos and Knossos. Early Christian churches, such as that of the Basilica of Sant' Apollinare in Classe were sometimes decorated with lilies. While predominantly depicted as white, those seen at Akrotiri are red lilies. The white lily has long been seen as a symbol of purity, coming to be associated with the Virgin Mary in the Middle Ages, from which came the name ‘Madonna lily’ (Lilium candidum). A well-known example is Leonardo da Vinci's Annunciation (1472–1475) in which the archangel Gabriel bears a Madonna lily. Other symbolic meanings include glory, love and birth.

==== Fleur-de-lis ====
Symbolic fleur-de-lis

The stylised lily, or fleur-de-lis (lily flower) has long been associated with royalty, although it may originally have been derived from the form of an iris. It has also been associated with the head of a spear. Its three parts have been associated with the three classes of mediaeval society, or alternatively faith, wisdom and chivalry. Whatever its exact derivation, it has come to be associated with France and the French monarchy since the earliest Frankish kings. Consequently, it became incorporated into not only French heraldry but also into many heraldic devices in jurisdictions where there had been historic French influence, such as Quebec and New Orleans. In modern times it appears in many forms, symbolic and decorative, and can be used on compasses to indicate the direction north, as well as the Scouting movement.

=== Tulips ===
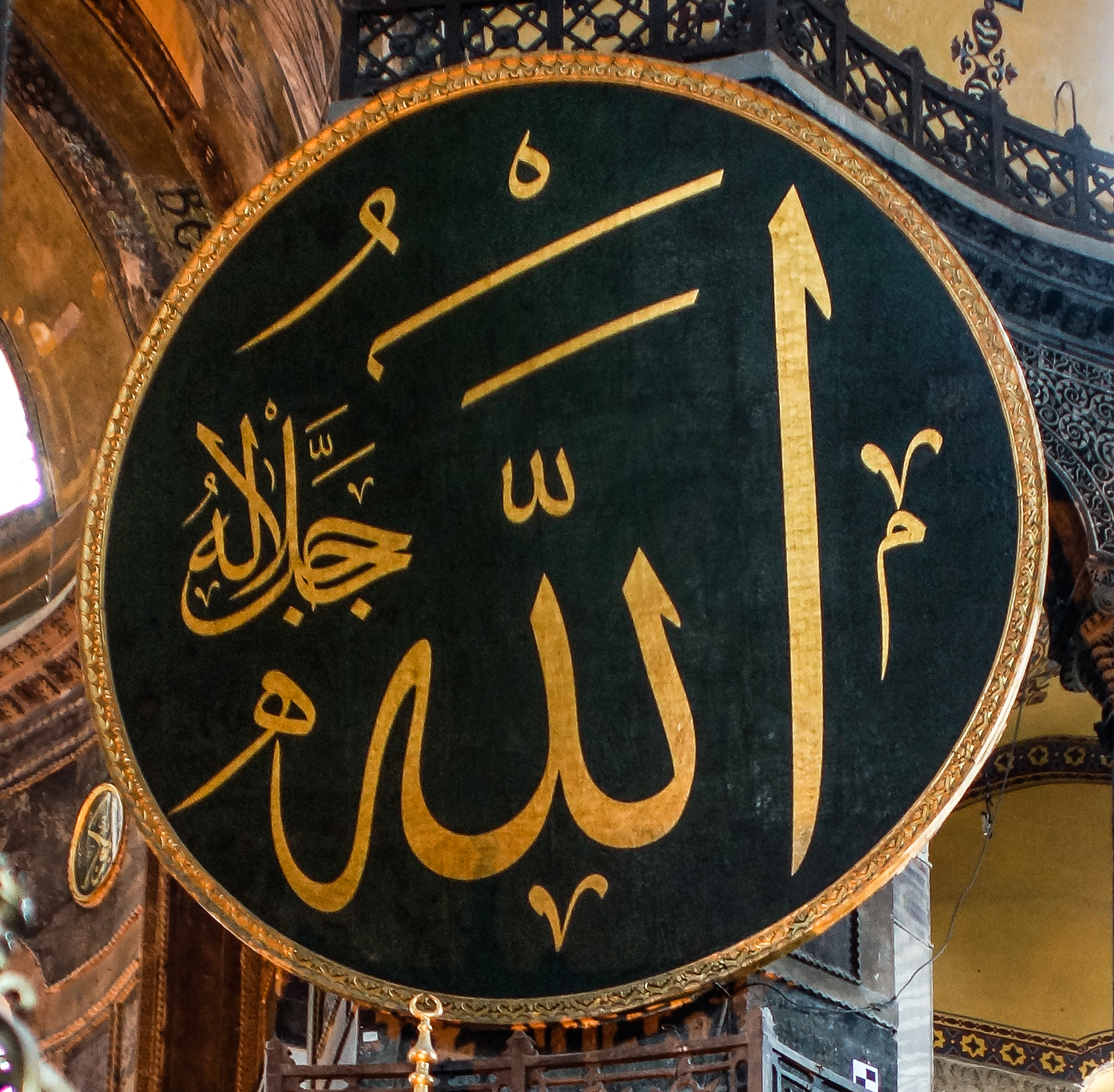
Allah, Hagia Sophia, Istanbul

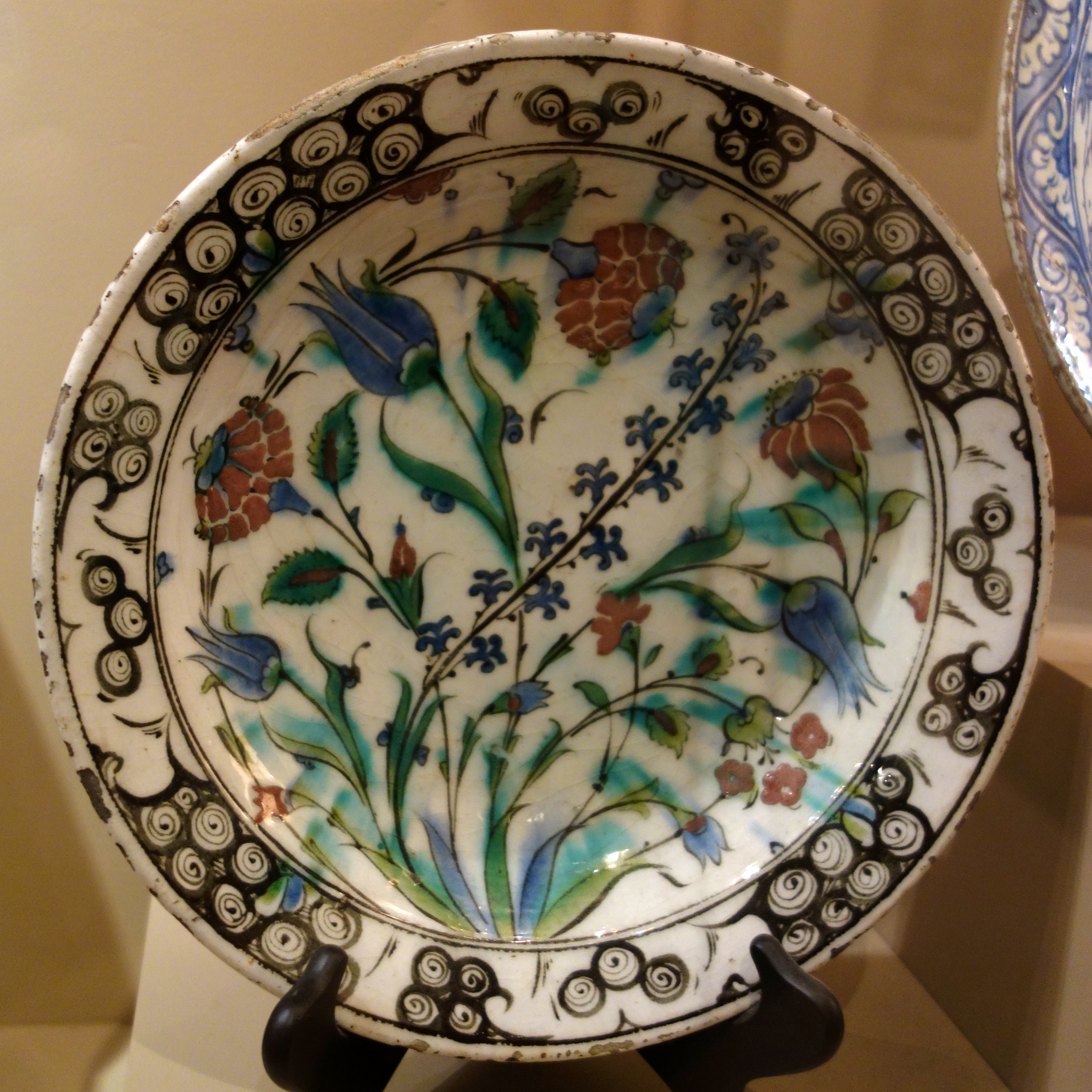
Ceramic dish, Iznik ca. 1600, with tulips, roses and hyacinths

Tulips (Tulipa) also have a long cultural tradition, particularly in the Islamic world. The Persian word for tulips, lâleh (لاله), was borrowed into Turkish and Arabic as lale. In Arabic letters, lale is written with the same letters as Allah, and is used to denote God symbolically. Tulips became widely used in decorative motifs on tiles, fabrics, and ceramics in Islamic art and the Ottoman Empire in particular, and were revered in poetry, such as that of Omar Khayam in the twelfth century.

Tulips were an essential part of the gardens of Persia, having been cultivated from the Steppes. As the Seljuks – Oghuz-Turkic leaders originated from the steppes – moved to Persia, and then west, they took tulips with them to Turkey, where many escaped cultivation and became naturalised. Today there are a number of places in Turkey called Laleli (‘with tulips’). Tulips first appeared in the decorative arts in Turkey in the thirteenth century and flourished under the Ottomans, in particular in the royal palaces, and was adopted by the Osmans as their symbol. Further species were collected from Persia and the spreading Ottoman Empire saw to it that tulip culture also spread. By the sixteenth century it was a national symbol, hence the designation "Tulip era", by which time they were becoming of economic importance.

By 1562 the tulip trade had reached Europe with the first shipment to Antwerp, where they were mistaken for vegetables, although they had been cultivated in Portugal since 1530, and first appeared in illustration in 1559, and the first tulip flowers were seen in the Netherlands in 1625. Tulips spread rapidly across Europe in the seventeenth century, and became an important trading item, initially in France before concentrating in the Netherlands. Eventually speculative trading in tulips became so intense as to cause a financial bubble which eventually collapsed, a period known as tulip mania (tulipomania), from 1634 to 1637, similar to the Ottoman Empire's Tulip era.

Nevertheless, since then the tulip has become indelibly associated with the Netherlands and all things Dutch. it was during this period that the tulipiere, a ceramic vase for growing tulips indoors was devised, and the Golden Age of Dutch Painting was replete with images of tulips. Although tulip festivals are held around the world in the spring, the most famous of these is the display at Keukenhof. One of the better-known novels on tulips is The Black Tulip by Alexandre Dumas, père in 1850, dealing with a contest to grow a black tulip in late seventeenth-century Haarlem.

=== Other ===
Fritillaria are also often used as floral emblems, for instance as the county flower of Oxfordshire, UK. Calochortus nuttallii, the sego lily, is the official state flower of Utah.

== Additional reading ==
=== Books ===
==== Systematics ====
- Judd, Walter S.; Campbell, Christopher S.; Kellogg, Elizabeth A.; Stevens, Peter F.; Donoghue, Michael J. (2007). Plant systematics: a phylogenetic approach. (1st ed. 1999, 2nd 2002) (3 ed.). Sinauer Associates. ISBN 978-0-87893-407-2. Archived from the original on 25 July 2020.
- Simpson, Michael G. (2011). Plant Systematics. Academic Press. ISBN 978-0-08-051404-8. Archived from the original on 27 April 2016.
- Rodolphe Spichiger; Mathieu Perret, eds. (2004) [2002]. Botanique systématique des plantes à fleurs: une approche phylogénétique nouvelle des angiospermes des régions tempérées et tropicales (Systematic Botany of Flowering Plants). Lausanne: Science Publishers. ISBN 978-1-57808-373-2.
- Stevens, Peter Francis (2013). The Development of Biological Systematics: Antoine-Laurent de Jussieu, Nature, and the Natural System. Columbia University Press, 2013. ISBN 978-0-231-51508-5.
- Stuessy, Tod F. (2009). Plant Taxonomy: The Systematic Evaluation of Comparative Data. Columbia University Press. ISBN 978-0-231-14712-5. Archived from the original on 1 November 2015.

==== Taxonomic classifications ====
- Adanson, Michel (1763). Familles des plantes. Paris: Vincent. Archived from the original on 4 March 2014.

Table of 58 families, Part II: Page 1 Archived 12 October 2017 at the Wayback Machine
Table of 1615 genera, Part II: Page 8 Archived 12 October 2017 at the Wayback Machine

- Jussieu, Antoine Laurent de (1789). Genera Plantarum, secundum ordines naturales disposita juxta methodum in Horto Regio Parisiensi exaratam. Paris. OCLC 5161409. Archived from the original on 24 March 2020.
- de Candolle, A.P. (1813). Théorie élémentaire de la botanique, ou exposition des principes de la classification naturelle et de l'art de décrire et d'etudier les végétaux. Archived from the original on 25 February 2014.
- Gray, Samuel Frederick (1821). A natural arrangement of British plants: according to their relations to each other as pointed out by Jussieu, De Candolle, Brown, &c. including those cultivated for use; with an introduction to botany, in which the terms newly introduced are explained. London: Baldwin. Archived from the original on 24 February 2014.
- Lindley, John (1830). An introduction to the natural system of botany : or, A systematic view of the organisation, natural affinities, and geographical distribution, of the whole vegetable kingdom : together with the uses of the most important species in medicine, the arts, and rural or domestic economy. London: Longman. Archived from the original on 4 December 2013.
- Lindley, John (1846). The Vegetable Kingdom: or, The structure, classification, and uses of plants, illustrated upon the natural system. London: Bradbury. Archived from the original on 4 March 2014.
- Bentham, G.; Hooker, JD (1862–1883). Genera plantarum ad exemplaria imprimis in herbariis kewensibus servata definita. London: L Reeve & Co. Archived from the original on 25 February 2014.
- Engler, Adolf; Prantl, Karl, eds. (1887–1915). Die Natürlichen Pflanzenfamilien nebst ihren Gattungen und wichtigeren Arten, insbesondere den Nutzpflanzen, unter Mitwirkung zahlreicher hervorragender Fachgelehrten. Leipzig: W. Engelmann. Archived from the original on 14 April 2015.
- Adolf Engler, ed. (1900–1968). Das Pflanzenreich: regni vegetablilis conspectus. Leipzig: Engelmann. Archived from the original on 18 January 2014.
- Engler, Adolf (1903). Syllabus der Pflanzenfamilien : eine Übersicht über das gesamte Pflanzensystem mit Berücksichtigung der Medicinal- und Nutzpflanzen nebst einer Übersicht über die Florenreiche und Florengebiete der Erde zum Gebrauch bei Vorlesungen und Studien über specielle und medicinisch-pharmaceutische Botanik. Berlin: Borntraeger. Archived from the original on 25 February 2014.
- Carter, Humphrey G. (1912). Genera of British plants arranged according to Engler's Syllabus der pflanzenfamilien (7 ed.). Cambridge University Press. Archived from the original on 4 March 2014.
- Lotsy, Johannes Paulus (1907–1911). Vorträge über botanische Stammesgeschichte, gehalten an der Reichsuniversität zu Leiden. Ein Lehrbuch der Pflanzensystematik. Jena: Fischer. Archived from the original on 4 March 2014.
- Hutchinson, John (1959). The families of flowering plants, arranged according to a new system based on their probable phylogeny. 2 vols. Macmillan.
- Dahlgren, R.M.; Clifford, H.T.; Yeo, P.F. (1985). The families of the monocotyledons. Berlin: Springer-Verlag. ISBN 978-3-642-64903-5. Archived from the original on 30 June 2019.
- Takhtadzhi︠a︡n, Armen Leonovich (2009). Flowering Plants. Springer. ISBN 978-1-4020-9609-9. Archived from the original on 3 November 2013.

==== Other ====
- Boisset, Caroline, ed. (2007). Lilies and related plants. 2007-2008 75th Anniversary Issue (PDF). London: Royal Horticultural Society Lily Group. ISBN 978-1-902896-84-7. Archived (PDF) from the original on 17 July 2016.
- Erhardt, Walter; et al. (2008). Der große Zander. Enzyklopädie der Pflanzennamen. Stuttgart: Verlag Eugen Ulmer. ISBN 978-3-8001-5406-7.
- Mabberley, David J. (2013). Mabberley's Plant-Book (3 ed.). Cambridge University Press. ISBN 978-1-107-78259-4.
- Sharma, O.P. (2009). Plant Taxonomy (2 ed.). Tata McGraw-Hill Education. ISBN 978-1-259-08137-8. Archived from the original on 9 February 2017.
- Reddy S. M.; et al., eds. (2007). University Botany - 3. New Age International. ISBN 978-81-224-1547-6.
- Kamenetsky, Rina; Okubo, Hiroshi, eds. (2012). Ornamental Geophytes: From Basic Science to Sustainable Production. CRC Press. ISBN 978-1-4398-4924-8. Archived from the original on 24 October 2017.
- Redouté, P. J. (1802–1816). Les liliacées. Paris: Redouté. Archived from the original on 27 February 2014. See also HTML version Archived 19 May 2011 at the Wayback Machine
- Kerner von Marilaun, Anton (1895–96). The natural history of plants, their forms, growth, reproduction, and distribution', trans. FW Oliver et al. from Pflanzenleben, 1890–1891. New York: Holt. p. 4: 603. Archived from the original on 4 March 2014. See also HTML version
- Walters, Dirk R.; Keil, David J. (1996). Vascular Plant Taxonomy. Kendall Hunt. ISBN 978-0-7872-2108-9.
- Weberling, Focko (1992). Morphology of Flowers and Inflorescences (trans. Richard J. Pankhurst). CUP Archive. ISBN 978-0-521-43832-2.
- Williams, D. M.; Knapp, Sandra, eds. (2010). Beyond Cladistics: The Branching of a Paradigm. University of California Press. ISBN 978-0-520-26772-5. Archived from the original on 21 June 2020.

=== Symposia ===
- Columbus, J.T.; Friar, E.A.; Porter, J.M.; Prince, L.M.; Simpson, M.G., eds. (2006). "Symposium issue: Monocots: comparative biology and evolution (excluding Poales). Proceedings of the Third International Conference on the Comparative Biology of the Monocotyledons, 31 Mar–4 Apr 2003". Aliso. 22 (1). ISSN 0065-6275. Archived from the original on 16 January 2014.
- Anders Barfod; Jerrold I. Davis; Gitte Petersen; Ole Seberg, eds. (2010). Diversity, Phylogeny, and Evolution in the Monocotyledons (Proceedings of the Fourth International Conference on the Comparative Biology of the Monocotyledons and the Fifth International Symposium on Grass Systematics and Evolution, Copenhagen 2008). Aarhus University Press. ISBN 978-87-7934-398-6. Archived from the original on 10 May 2015.
- "MONOCOTS V: 5th International Conference on Comparative Biology of Monocotyledons. New York July 2013". Archived from the original on 24 October 2013.

=== Journal articles ===
- Kelch, D.G. (2000). "What happened to the lily family?". Pacific Horticulture. 61: 76–79.
- Peruzzi, Lorenzo; Jarvis, Charlie E. (2009). "Typification of Linnaean Names in Liliaceae". Taxon. 58 (4): 1359–1365. Bibcode:2009Taxon..58.1359P. doi:10.1002/tax.584024. JSTOR 27757024.

=== Web ===
==== Databases ====
- AP Website. "Liliaceae". Missouri Botanical Garden. Archived from the original on 2 February 2014.
- GRIN. "Liliaceae". Germplasm Resources Information Network. Archived from the original on 30 October 2013.
- ITIS. "Liliaceae". Integrated Taxonomic Information System.
- NCBI. "Liliaceae". National Center for Biotechnology Information. Archived from the original on 10 October 2019.
- Watson, L.; Dallwitz, M.J. (1992–2014). "The families of flowering plants: descriptions, illustrations, identification, and information retrieval". DELTA – DEscription Language for TAxonomy. Archived from the original on 9 May 2008.
- Desmet, Peter; Brouilet, Luc (2010). "Liliaceae de Jussieu". PhytoKeys (25): 55–67. doi:10.3897/phytokeys.25.3100. PMC 3819130. PMID 24198712. Archived from the original on 22 February 2014.

==== Flora ====
- Chen, Xinqi. "Liliaceae". Flora of China. Archived from the original on 14 March 2014.
- Utech, Frederick H. "Liliaceae". Flora of North America. Archived from the original on 6 March 2012.
  - Cronquist, Arthur (2008). "A Commentary on the General System of Classification of Flowering Plants, in". Flora of North America. Archived from the original on 23 February 2014.
- "Liliaceae". Flora of Hawaii & Plant Family Profiles. University of Hawai'i. Archived from the original on 2 November 2013.
- Ali, S. I. "Liliaceae". Flora of Pakistan. Archived from the original on 2 March 2014.
- Walters, Stuart Max; Cullen, James, eds. (1986). The European Garden Flora. Cambridge University Press. ISBN 978-0-521-24859-4. Archived from the original on 23 March 2017.
- Brittan, N.H.; et al. (1987). "(Search for:) Liliaceae". Flora of Australia Online. vol. 45. Australian Biological Resources Study. Archived from the original on 16 February 2014.
- Frodin, D.G. (2001). Guide to Standard Floras of the World: An Annotated, Geographically Arranged Systematic Bibliography of the Principal Floras, Enumerations, Checklists and Chorological Atlases of Different Areas. Cambridge University Press. ISBN 978-1-139-42865-1. Archived from the original on 7 May 2020.

==== Other ====
- Stephen Downie; Ken Robertson. "Digital Flowers". University of Illinois. Archived from the original on 2 February 2014.
- "International Code of Nomenclature for algae, fungi, and plants". Bratislava: International Association for Plant Taxonomy. 2011. Archived from the original on 4 November 2013.
- "Liliaceae". Pacific Bulb Society. Archived from the original on 19 February 2014.
- Lobstein, Marion Blois. "Where Have All the Lilies Gone? Long-Time Changin' in the Liliaceous Families". Prince William Wildflower Society. Archived from the original on 12 January 2014.
- Saylor, Jesse L. "Liliaceae Segregated According to Brummitt (1992)". Archived from the original on 11 November 2013.
- "Liliaceae". eMonocot. Archived from the original on 30 October 2013.
- "Liliaceae". Belles fleurs de France. Archived from the original on 25 June 2012.
