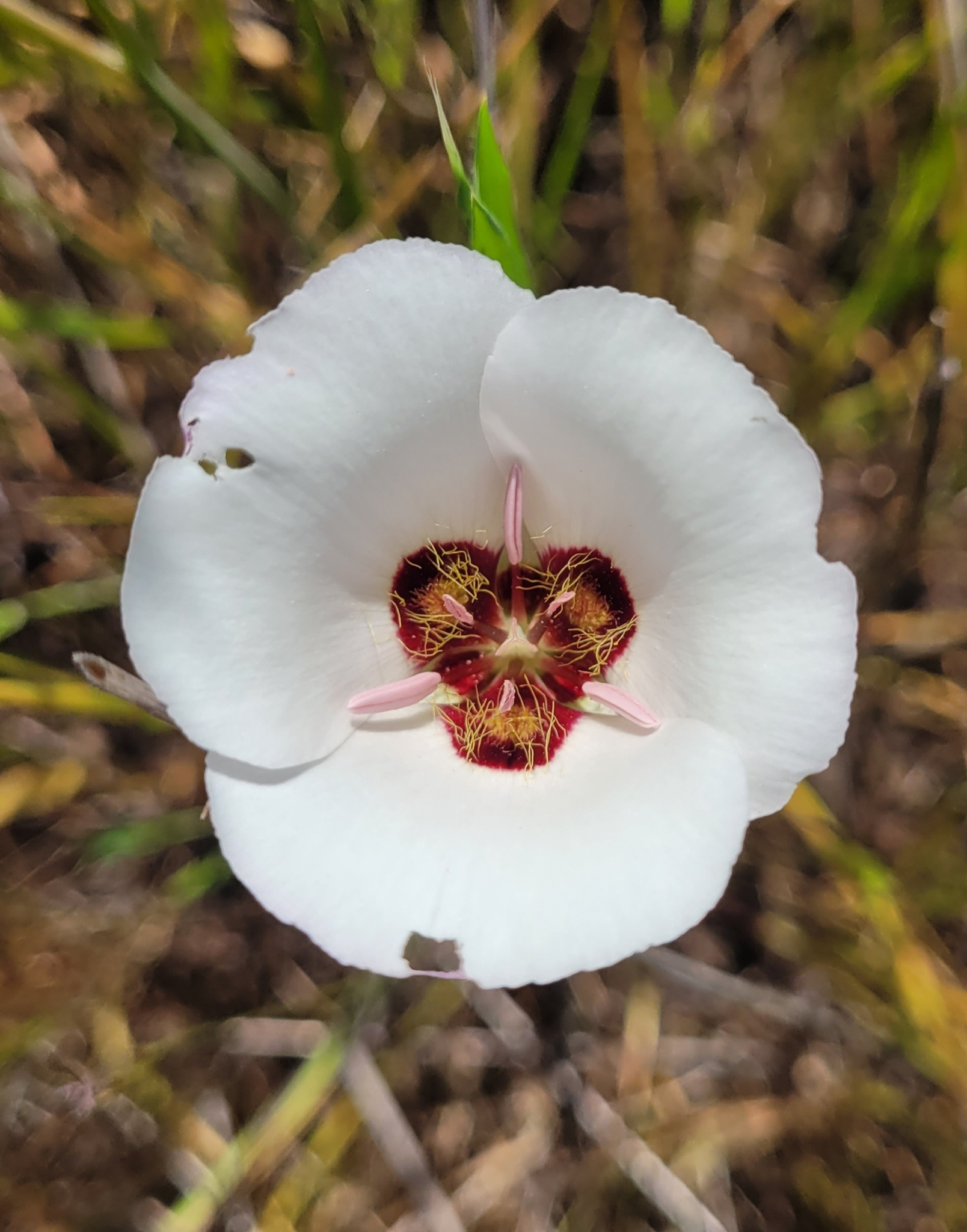

Conservation status
- Apparently Secure (NatureServe)

Scientific classification
- Kingdom: Plantae
- Clade: Tracheophytes
- Clade: Angiosperms
- Clade: Monocots
- Order: Liliales
- Family: Liliaceae
- Genus: Calochortus
- Species: C. catalinae

Binomial name
- Calochortus catalinae S.Wats.

= Calochortus catalinae =

Species of flowering plant

Calochortus catalinae is a species of mariposa lily known by the common name Santa Catalina mariposa lily.

== Distribution ==
The bulb is endemic to Southern California. It is native along the coastline in grasslands and open chaparral and woodlands habitats, especially on the Channel Islands and in the Santa Monica Mountains. It is also found in other Transverse Ranges, the Santa Ana Mountains of the Peninsular Ranges, and the Outer South California Coast Ranges.

== Description ==
Calochortus catalinae produces long basal leaves and tall, branching stems up to 60 centimeters high.

The purple-tinted sepals are up to 3 centimeters long and the longer petals are usually white or very pale pink with a blotch of purple or deep red at the bases. The bowl of the petals may have sparse long hairs. The anthers are usually light in color, often pink.

They are also perennial.
