= Laleli =

Laleli may refer to:

- Laleli, Fatih
- Laleli, Pazaryolu
- Laleli, Refahiye
- Laleli, Pazaryolu, a village in the Pazaryolu district in Eastern Turkey
