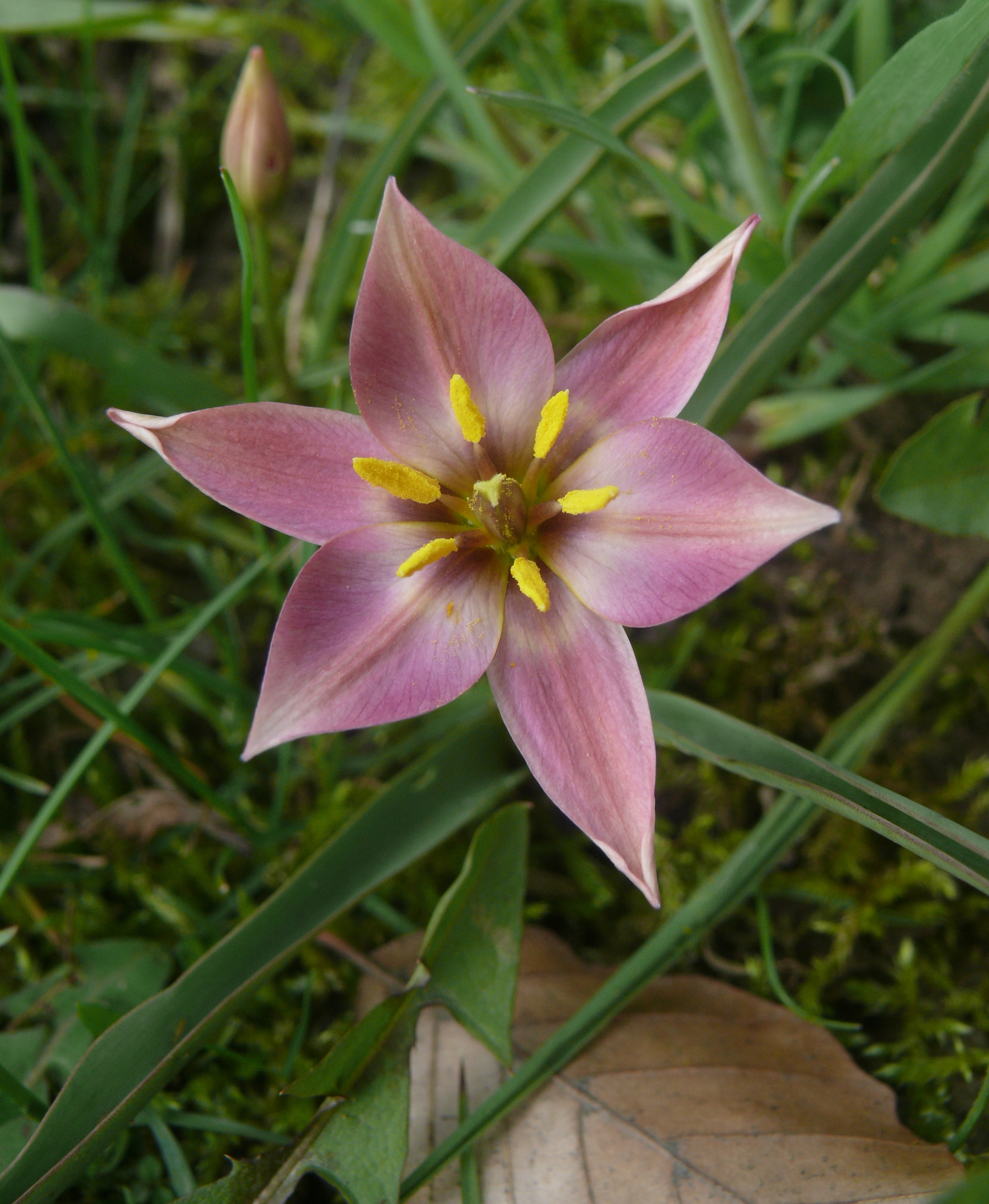
- Tulipa humilis

Scientific classification
- Kingdom: Plantae
- Clade: Tracheophytes
- Clade: Angiosperms
- Clade: Monocots
- Order: Liliales
- Family: Liliaceae
- Subfamily: Lilioideae
- Genus: Tulipa
- Subgenus: Tulipa subg. Eriostemones
- Species: T. humilis

Binomial name
- Tulipa humilis Herb.

Varieties
- Tulipa humilis var. aucheriana (Baker) Christenh.; Tulipa humilis var. humilis; Tulipa humilis var. kurdica (Wendelbo) Christenh.; Tulipa humilis var. pulchella (Fenzl ex Regel) Christenh.; Tulipa humilis var. violacea (Boiss. & Buhse) Christenh.

Synonyms
- Synonymy: Tulipa lownei Baker; Tulipa lownei var. haynei Baker; Tulipa caucasica Lipsky; Tulipa violacea var. pallida Hausskn.; Tulipa lipskyi Grossh.; Tulipa narcissiodora Markgr.; Tulipa humilis subsp. matinae Zojajifar & Sheidai

= Tulipa humilis =

Species of flowering plant

Tulipa humilis is a species of flowering plant in the lily family Liliaceae, found in Syria, Lebanon, Palestine, Turkey, Iran, and the North Caucasus region of Russia. The flowers are pink with yellow centers. Its preferred habitat are rocky mountain slopes. It is known by several other names in horticulture.

== Varieties and synonyms ==
Tulipa humilis is a very variable species in both size and the appearance of the flowers. Five varieties are accepted, and different synonyms are used in horticulture.

- Tulipa humilis var. aucheriana (Baker) Christenh. (synonyms Tulipa aucheriana Baker and T. aucheriana subsp. westii Mouterde) – southeastern Turkey, Anti-Lebanon, Iran, and Afghanistan. Cultivated plants can be treated as a cultivar group, T. humilis Aucheriana Group.
- Tulipa humilis var. humilis (synonyms Tulipa caucasica Lipsky, T. humilis subsp. matinae Zojajifar & Sheidai, T. lipskyi Grossh., T. lownei Baker, T. lownei var. haynei Baker, T. narcissiodora Markgr., and T. violacea var. pallida Hausskn.) – southeastern Turkey, Anti-Lebanon, North Caucasus, and northern Iran.
- Tulipa humilis var. kurdica (Wendelbo) Christenh. (synonym Tulipa kurdica Wendelbo) – northern Iraq
- Tulipa humilis var. pulchella (Fenzl ex Regel) Christenh. (synonyms Tulipa pulchella (Fenzl ex Regel) Baker, T. sylvestris var. pulchella Fenzl ex Regel, T. alpina J.Gay ex Baker) – southern and south-central Turkey, northern Iraq, and northern Iran. Cultivated plants are in the T. humilis Pulchella Group.
- Tulipa humilis var. violacea (Boiss. & Buhse) Christenh. (synonym Tulipa violacea Boiss. & Buhse) – southeastern Transcaucasus. Cultivated plants are in the T. humilis Violacea Group.

== Cultivation ==
Under the synonym Tulipa aucheriana this plant has been given the Royal Horticultural Society's Award of Garden Merit.
