= 2010–11 TFF 1. Lig =

48th season of second-tier football league in Turkey

1. Lig
- Season: 2010–11
- Champions: Mersin İdmanyurdu
- Promoted: Mersin İdmanyurdu; Samsunspor; Orduspor
- Relegated: Ankaraspor (dismissed); Altay; Diyarbakırspor
- Matches played: 272
- Goals scored: 567 (2.08 per match)
- Top goalscorer: Simon Zenke (SAM): 16; Mbilla Etame (ADN): 16
- Biggest home win: Bolu-Tavşanlı: 5–0
- Biggest away win: Diyarbakır-Samsun: 0–5
- Highest scoring: Ordu-Gaziantep BB: 2–4

The 2010–11 TFF 1. Lig (referred to as the Bank Asya 1. Lig for sponsorship reasons) is the tenth season since the league established in 2001 and 48th season of the second-level football league of Turkey since its establishment in 1963–64.

Normal season started on 20 August 2010, Friday by Adanaspor-Mersin İdmanyurdu match and ended on 15 May 2011. Play-off games were played 23–29 May 2011.

League was started with 17 teams. Ankaraspor, which was directly relegated from 2009–10 Süper Lig, was dismissed from the federation because the club appealed to a court for that decision. Top two teams will directly be promoted to the 2011–12 Süper Lig. The third team to be promoted was determined via play-off games among 3rd through 6th teams of the league. Bottom two teams were relegated to 2011–12 TFF Second League.

== Teams ==
Ankaraspor was relegated from the Süper Lig by TFF in October 2009 for anti-competitive behaviour. Denizlispor was relegated from Süper Lig after the 31st week games of Süper Lig 2009–10. After the 33rd week of Süper Lig 2009–10, Diyarbakırspor were also relegated.

Akhisar Belediyespor promoted from TFF Second League after a 2–0 win over Göztepe on May 2, 2010. Güngören Belediyespor returned to First League, were relegated in 2008–2009 season, their first attempt after a 1–0 win against Tokatspor at away match on May 2, 2010. The last promoting team was Tavşanlı Linyitspor, made second consecutive promotion, after a 2–1 win against Eyüpspor at extra play-off final in Antalya on May 30, 2010.

On 4 August 2010, the TFF dismissed Ankaraspor from the league because the club has gone before the court for the previous year's relegation matters, an out-of-system way that the federation that does not approve against its final decisions. The TFF have decided that the league will be played with 17 teams for 2010–11; teams who were originally scheduled to play against Ankaraspor will be given a bye in the corresponding round.

Location of teams in TFF 1. Lig 2010–11

=== Team summaries ===
Team	Venue	Capacity	Kitmaker	President	Coach
Adanaspor	Adana 5 Ocak Stadium	14,085	Nike	Bayram Akgül	(Turkey) Eyüp Arın
Akhisar Belediyespor	Akhisar Belediye Stadium	2,918	Adidas	Hüseyin Eryüksel	(Turkey) Hamza Hamzaoğlu
Altay	İzmir Alsancak Stadium	15,358	Lescon	Ahmet Taşpınar	(Turkey) Mehmet Altıparmak
Ankaraspor (dismissed)	Yenikent Asaş Stadium	19,626	Nike	Ruhi Kurnaz	
Boluspor	Bolu Atatürk Stadium	8,881	Lescon	Emin Semercioğlu	(Turkey) Hüsnü Özkara
Çaykur Rizespor	New Rize City Stadium	15,485	Umbro	Metin Kalkavan	(Turkey) Ümit Kayıhan
Denizlispor	Denizli Atatürk Stadium	15,427	Lescon	Salih Amiroğlu	(Turkey) Kenan Atik
Diyarbakırspor	Diyarbakır Atatürk Stadium	12,963	Lescon	vacant	(Turkey) Kemal Zeydan
Gaziantep Büyükşehir Belediyespor	Kamil Ocak Stadium	16,981	Lotto	Ünsal Göksen	(Turkey) Erol Azgın
Giresunspor	Giresun Atatürk Stadium	12,191	Lescon	Ömer Ülkü	(Turkey) Bahri Kaya
Güngören Belediyespor	Mimar Yahya Baş Stadium	7,589	Umbro	Yahya Baş	(Turkey) Metin Altınay
Karşıyaka	İzmir Atatürk Stadium	51,295	Lotto	Hüseyin Çalışkan	(Turkey) Reha Kapsal
Kartalspor	Kartal City Stadium	7,195	Lotto	Binali Aydın	(Turkey) Engin Korukır
Kayseri Erciyesspor	B.B. Kadir Has Stadium	32,864	Lotto	Ziya Eren	(Turkey) Ergün Penbe
Mersin İdmanyurdu	Tevfik Sırrı Gür Stadium	10,128	Lotto	Ali Kahramanlı	(Turkey) Nurullah Sağlam
Orduspor	Ordu 19 Eylül Stadium	11,024	Umbro	Nedim Türkmen	(Turkey) Metin Diyadin
Samsunspor	Samsun 19 Mayıs Stadium	12,720	Lig	İ. Erkurt Tutu	(Turkey) Hüseyin Kalpar
TKİ Tavşanlı Linyitspor	Tavşanlı Ada City Stadium	3,000	Lotto	Mustafa Çokuslu	(Turkey) Mustafa Akçay

=== Managerial changes ===
Before the start of the season

Team	Outgoing manager	Manner of departure	Date of vacancy	Replaced by	Date of appointment
Ankaraspor	(Germany) Jürgen Röber	Contract cancelled	07.12.2009	(Turkey) Önder Özen	09.07.2010
Boluspor	(Turkey) Cüneyt Karakuş	Contract ended	31.05.2010	(Turkey) Levent Eriş	02.06.2010
Mersin İdmanyurdu	(Turkey) Ergün Penbe	Contract ended	31.05.2010	(Turkey) Yüksel Yeşilova	03.06.2010
Kartalspor	(Turkey) Kadir Özcan	Contract ended	31.05.2010	(Turkey) Ergün Penbe	08.06.2010
Orduspor	(Turkey) Ahmet Akcan	Contract ended	31.05.2010	(Turkey) Uğur Tütüneker	10.06.2010
Altay	(Turkey) Güvenç Kurtar	Contract ended	31.05.2010	(Turkey) Ercan Ertemçöz	12.06.2010
Giresunspor	(Turkey) Levent Eriş	Contract ended	31.05.2010	(Turkey) Hüsnü Özkara	18.06.2010
Diyarbakırspor	(Turkey) Mehmet Budakın	Contract ended	31.05.2010	(Turkey) Suat Kaya	06.07.2010
Denizlispor	(Turkey) Hakan Kutlu	Contract ended	31.05.2010	(Turkey) Hamza Hamzaoğlu	09.07.2010

After the start of the season

Team	Outgoing manager	Manner of departure	Date of vacancy	Replaced by	Date of appointment
Karşıyaka	(Turkey) Erdoğan Arıca	Mutual consent	01 Sep 2010	(Turkey) Kemal Kılıç	07 Sep 2010
Adanaspor	(Turkey) Kemal Kılıç	Mutual consent	06 Sep 2010	(Turkey) Cemal Gürsel Menteşe	14 Sep 2010
Gaziantep BB	(Turkey) Cemal Gürsel Menteşe	Mutual consent	08 Sep 2010	(Turkey) Erol Azgın	08 Sep 2010
Altay	(Turkey) Ercan Ertemçöz	Mutual consent	05 Oct 2010	(Turkey) Coşkun Demirbakan	06 Oct 2010
Giresunspor	(Turkey) Hüsnü Özkara	Mutual consent	10 Oct 2010	(Turkey) Bahri Kaya	14 Oct 2010
Mersin İdmanyurdu	(Turkey) Yüksel Yeşilova	Mutual consent	17 Oct 2010	(Turkey) Nurullah Sağlam	20 Oct 2010
Diyarbakırspor	(Turkey) Suat Kaya	Resignation	23 Oct 2010	(Turkey) Engin Korukır	03 Nov 2010
Adanaspor	(Turkey) Cemal Gürsel Menteşe	Resignation	26 Oct 2010	(Turkey) Osman Özdemir	09 Nov 2010
Kartalspor	(Turkey) Ergün Penbe	Resignation	09 Dec 2010	(Turkey) Engin Korukır	29.12.2010
Karşıyaka	(Turkey) Kemal Kılıç	Mutual consent	23 Dec 2010	(Turkey) Turgut Uçar	28 Dec 2010
Diyarbakırspor	(Turkey) Engin Korukır	Mutual consent	29 Dec 2010	(Turkey) Ercan Albay	02 Jan 2011
Diyarbakırspor	(Turkey) Ercan Albay	resigned	16 Jan 2011	(Turkey) Nevzat Türker	21 Jan 2011
Denizlispor	(Turkey) Hamza Hamzaoğlu	resigned	29 Jan 2011	(Turkey) Kenan Atik	17 Feb 2011
Karşıyaka	(Turkey) Turgut Uçar	resigned	21 Feb 2011	(Turkey) Reha Kapsal	22 Feb 2011
Akhisar B.G.S.	(Turkey) Atilla Özcan	resigned	27 Feb 2011	(Turkey) Hamza Hamzaoğlu	28 Feb 2011
Adanaspor	(Turkey) Osman Özdemir	resigned	27 Feb 2011	(Turkey) Eyüp Arın	28 Feb 2011
Denizlispor	(Turkey) Kenan Atik	became assistant manager	01 Mar 2011	(Turkey) Serhat Güller	01 Mar 2011
Kayseri Erciyesspor	(Turkey) Levent Devrim	resigned	02 Mar 2011	(Turkey) Ergün Penbe	02 Mar 2011
Diyarbakırspor	(Turkey) Nevzat Türker	became assistant manager	22 Mar 2011	(Turkey) Kemal Zeydan	22 Mar 2011
Orduspor	(Turkey) Uğur Tütüneker	resigned	21 Mar 2011	(Turkey) Metin Diyadin	22 Mar 2011
Altay	(Turkey) Coşkun Demirbakan	resigned	11 Apr 2011	(Turkey) Mehmet Altıparmak	11 Apr 2011
Denizlispor	(Turkey) Serhat Güller	resigned	25 Apr 2011	(Turkey) Kenan Atik	25 Apr 2011
Boluspor	(Turkey) Levent Eriş	resigned	24 Apr 2011	(Turkey) Hüsnü Özkara	28 Apr 2011

=== Foreign players ===
Club	Player 1	Player 2	Player 3	Player 4	Former Players
Adanaspor	(Cameroon) Marc Kibong Mbamba	(Cameroon) Mbilla Etame	(Nigeria) Fredrick Okwara		
Akhisarspor	(Brazil) Diego Lima	(Bulgaria) Orlin Orlinov			(Egypt) Tarek Amer (Nigeria) Maxwell Ofuyah
Altay	(Republic of the Congo) Thernand Bakouboula	(Democratic Republic of the Congo) Parfait Mandanda	(Ivory Coast) Alpha Koné	(Uganda) Hassan Wasswa	
Boluspor	(Brazil) Fabiano Oliveira	(France) Landry Matondo	(North Macedonia) Oliver Peev	(Togo) Cyril Guedjé	
Çaykur Rizespor	(Ghana) Clement Aboagye	(Liberia) Theo Lewis Weeks	(United States) Freddy Adu		
Denizlispor	(Benin) Damien Chrysostome	(Brazil) Daniel Braga	(Trinidad and Tobago) Darryl Roberts		
Diyarbakırspor	(Kazakhstan) Ali Aliyev	(Togo) Euloge Ahodikpe			(Albania) Gilman Lika
Gaziantep B.B.					
Giresunspor	(Brazil) Bergamin	(Brazil) Boka	(Brazil) Isael		
Güngörenspor Belediyespor	(Austria) Josip Komarac	(Senegal) Babacar Diallo			
Karşıyaka	(Brazil) Roni	(Brazil) Tiago Bezerra			
Kartalspor					(Nigeria) Debola Ogunseye
Kayseri Erciyesspor	(Cameroon) Severin Bikoko				
Mersin İdmanyurdu	(Azerbaijan) Ernani Pereira	(Cameroon) Joseph Boum	(Liberia) Tonia Tisdell	(Nigeria) Nduka Ozokwo	(Romania) Vlad Bujor (Sierra Leone) Al Bangura
Orduspor	(Ghana) Jerry Akaminko	(North Macedonia) Jovan Kostovski			
Samsunspor	(Ghana) Jonathan Quartey	(Nigeria) Akeem Agbetu	(Nigeria) Simon Zenke		
TKİ Tavşanlı Linyitspor	(Ghana) Ibrahim Sulamena	(Nigeria) Debola Ogunseye	(North Macedonia) Milan Ristovski		

== League table ==
Pos	Team	Pld	W	D	L	GF	GA	GD	Pts	Qualification or relegation
1	Mersin İdmanyurdu (C, P)	32	17	7	8	39	29	+10	58	Promotion to Süper Lig
2	Samsunspor (P)	32	16	10	6	45	20	+25	58	Promotion to Süper Lig
3	Gaziantep B.B.	32	16	9	7	43	26	+17	57	Qualification for Promotion Playoffs
4	Çaykur Rizespor	32	15	9	8	36	24	+12	54	Qualification for Promotion Playoffs
5	Orduspor (O, P)	32	14	12	6	47	29	+18	54	Qualification for Promotion Playoffs
6	TKİ Tavşanlı Linyitspor	32	13	12	7	32	28	+4	51	Qualification for Promotion Playoffs
7	Boluspor	32	14	7	11	46	31	+15	49	
8	Kayseri Erciyesspor	32	11	15	6	40	29	+11	48	
9	Denizlispor	32	11	11	10	40	31	+9	44	
10	Karşıyaka	32	10	11	11	26	34	−8	41	
11	Giresunspor	32	11	5	16	27	32	−5	38	
12	Adanaspor	32	8	13	11	41	42	−1	37	
13	Kartalspor	32	7	13	12	21	29	−8	34	
14	Akhisar Belediyespor	32	8	9	15	27	39	−12	33	
15	Güngörenspor	32	7	12	13	19	42	−23	33	
16	Altay (R)	32	7	10	15	27	43	−16	31	Relegation to TFF Second League
17	Diyarbakırspor (R)	32	1	7	24	10	59	−49	10	Relegation to TFF Second League

Source: TFF First League page
Rules for classification: 1) points; 2) goal difference; 3) number of goals scored.
(C) Champions; (O) Play-off winners; (P) Promoted; (R) Relegated

== Positions by round ==
Team ╲ Round	1	2	3	4	5	6	7	8	9	10	11	12	13	14	15	16	17	18	19	20	21	22	23	24	25	26	27	28	29	30	31	32	33	34
Mersin İdmanyurdu	8	5	5	5	6	6	6	8	8	9	13	10	9	7	5	8	9	9	9	8	8	7	4	6	5	4	4	3	2	2	2	2	2	1
Samsunspor	8	5	5	7	9	8	8	7	6	5	6	7	4	4	7	4	4	3	2	2	2	1	2	5	2	1	1	1	1	1	1	1	1	2
Gaziantep B.B.	4	11	16	14	12	7	7	5	5	3	3	4	5	5	6	9	8	7	4	5	3	4	8	8	7	8	7	5	3	5	3	3	3	3
Çaykur Rizespor	3	1	2	3	5	3	4	4	4	6	5	2	2	2	1	1	2	1	3	6	7	3	6	3	4	2	2	6	4	3	5	7	4	4
Orduspor	4	4	1	2	4	4	3	3	3	2	4	5	6	6	3	3	3	2	1	1	1	5	1	1	3	6	6	7	7	7	8	6	5	5
TKİ Tavşanlı Linyitspor	8	13	14	17	17	17	14	15	11	8	8	12	9	9	9	7	6	6	5	7	4	6	3	2	6	3	3	2	5	4	4	4	6	6
Boluspor	15	16	7	6	3	5	5	6	7	7	7	6	8	8	8	6	5	4	6	3	6	8	7	4	1	5	5	4	6	6	7	5	7	7
Kayseri Erciyesspor	4	3	4	4	2	2	2	2	2	4	2	3	3	3	4	5	7	8	8	9	9	9	9	9	9	7	8	8	8	8	6	8	8	8
Denizlispor	1	2	3	1	1	1	1	1	1	1	1	1	1	1	2	2	1	5	7	4	5	2	5	7	8	9	9	9	9	9	9	9	9	9
Karşıyaka	4	15	15	16	14	11	11	13	13	15	11	8	8	10	10	10	10	11	10	10	10	10	10	10	10	10	10	10	10	10	10	10	10	10
Giresunspor	2	7	8	10	8	10	12	14	15	16	16	16	17	17	16	15	15	15	16	16	16	16	14	16	16	16	14	11	11	11	11	11	11	11
Adanaspor	8	9	11	13	15	12	13	9	9	11	14	11	10	11	11	11	11	10	11	11	13	12	13	15	11	12	13	13	12	12	12	12	12	12
Kartalspor	14	10	10	9	7	9	10	10	10	12	9	13	14	14	15	16	16	16	15	15	15	15	15	13	14	14	15	16	16	15	16	16	15	13
Akhisar Belediyespor	8	8	9	11	13	16	16	16	16	14	10	14	12	12	13	12	13	13	12	13	12	14	16	14	15	15	16	15	15	16	14	14	13	14
Güngörenspor	17	17	17	12	11	14	15	12	12	13	15	15	15	15	14	14	14	14	13	12	14	11	12	12	13	13	11	12	13	14	15	15	14	15
Altay	8	13	13	8	10	13	9	11	14	9	12	9	13	13	12	13	12	12	14	14	11	13	11	11	12	11	12	14	14	13	13	13	16	16
Diyarbakırspor	16	12	12	15	16	15	17	17	17	17	17	17	16	16	17	17	17	17	17	17	17	17	17	17	17	17	17	17	17	17	17	17	17	17

Source: TFF 1. Lig page

== Results ==
Home \ Away	ADA	AKH	ALT	BOL	ÇYR	DEN	DYB	GBB	GRS	GÜN	KSK	KRT	KER	MİY	ORD	SAM	TAV
Adanaspor		2–2	4–1	1–2	2–1	0–0	2–0	1–1	2–2	1–0	0–2	2–3	2–2	0–0	3–1	1–1	1–0
Akhisar Belediyespor	1–0		1–0	1–0	0–2	1–2	1–1	1–2	1–0	1–0	1–2	1–0	0–2	0–1	1–2	1–2	0–1
Altay	0–0	1–3		3–3	1–0	0–2	0–0	0–0	2–1	0–1	2–0	0–0	2–3	1–2	0–2	0–1	1–2
Boluspor	3–0	3–3	1–0		0–0	0–2	1–1	1–0	3–0	3–0	1–0	0–1	0–1	2–1	1–2	0–1	5–0
Çaykur Rizespor	2–1	0–0	2–2	2–1		0–1	1–0	1–0	1–0	3–0	3–0	1–0	2–2	3–0	3–0	0–1	3–1
Denizlispor	1–1	1–1	4–1	2–3	1–1		0–1	0–1	0–1	2–0	0–0	1–1	1–1	1–2	0–1	0–1	1–0
Diyarbakırspor	1–4	0–2	0–0	0–2	0–1	0–3		0–3	0–2	0–0	0–1	2–3	1–1	0–2	0–3	0–5	0–1
Gaziantep B.B.	1–0	2–0	3–0	2–1	3–0	2–3	1–0		3–0	0–1	1–0	0–0	0–0	1–0	0–0	3–1	0–0
Giresunspor	2–1	1–0	1–0	2–1	0–0	2–0	1–1	2–0		3–0	1–2	1–0	1–1	1–2	0–2	0–1	0–1
Güngören Belediyespor	0–3	0–0	2–2	1–4	0–0	1–1	1–0	2–2	1–0		0–0	2–1	0–2	0–0	1–1	1–0	1–1
Karşıyaka	2–2	0–0	0–1	1–1	1–0	2–2	2–0	1–1	0–1	1–1		1–0	1–0	0–0	0–2	3–2	1–1
Kartalspor	0–0	2–0	0–0	0–3	0–1	2–1	1–0	2–3	1–0	0–0	0–2		0–0	0–1	2–2	0–0	1–1
Kayseri Erciyesspor	4–1	1–0	1–2	1–1	0–0	1–3	4–0	2–1	1–1	0–2	1–1	2–0		1–1	1–1	0–2	2–0
Mersin İdman Yurdu	0–0	2–1	2–3	2–0	3–0	2–4	1–0	1–3	1–0	1–0	4–0	2–1	1–2		1–4	1–0	1–0
Orduspor	2–2	4–0	1–2	0–0	1–1	0–0	3–1	2–4	2–1	4–0	1–0	0–0	1–0	0–1		1–1	1–2
Samsunspor	3–1	0–0	1–0	0–1	1–2	1–1	3–1	4–0	1–0	3–0	3–0	0–0	0–0	1–1	1–1		3–0
TKİ Tavşanlı Linyitspor	2–1	3–3	0–0	1–0	2–0	1–0	4–0	0–0	1–0	3–1	2–0	0–0	1–1	0–0	0–0	1–1	

Source: TFF 1. Lig page
Legend: Blue = home team win; Yellow = draw; Red = away team win.

== Promotion playoffs ==
The teams ranked 3rd through 6th will compete in the promotion playoffs for the 2011–12 Süper Lig. The 3rd team and 6th team will play two matches in their own grounds. Likewise 4th and 5th teams will play two matches elimination round. This round is named as semi-finals. Winner teams will play one final match at a neutral venue. Winner of the final will be third team to promote to Süper Lig 2011–2012.

Semi-finals 3-6

23 May 2011
Monday, 16:00

TKİ Tavşanlı Linyitspor	1 - 2	Gaziantep Büyükşehir Belediyespor
Abdi Aktaş 67'	Report	Kenan Aslanoğlu 19'; Kenan Aslanoğlu 84'

Dumlupınar Stadium, Kütahya
Referee: Aytekin Durmaz

26 May 2011
Thursday, 17:00

Gaziantep Büyükşehir Belediyespor	0 – 1	TKİ Tavşanlı Linyitspor
	Report	72' (F) Mehmet Akyüz

Kamil Ocak Stadium, Gaziantep
Referee: Bülent Yıldırım

Semi-finals 4–5

23 May 2011
Monday, 20:00

Orduspor	4 – 0	Çaykur Rizespor
Ahmet Kuru 5'; Müslüm Yelken 16'; İrfan Başaran 34' (pen.); Jovan Kostovski 41'	Report

19 Eylül Stadium, Ordu
Referee: Halis Özkahya

26 May 2011
Thursday, 20:00

Çaykur Rizespor	3 – 3	Orduspor
	Report

New City Stadium, Rize
Referee: Yunus Yıldırım

Final

29 May 2011
Sunday, 20:00

Gaziantep Büyükşehir Belediyespor	0 – 1	Orduspor

19 Mayıs Stadium, Ankara
Referee: -

== Top goalscorers ==
Rank	Player	Club	Goals
1	(Nigeria) Simon Zenke	Samsunspor	16
1	(Cameroon) Mbilla Etame	Adanaspor	16
2	(Turkey) Serdar Deliktaş	Gaziantep BB	13
2	(Turkey) Mehmet Akyüz	Tavşanlı Linyitspor	13
4	(Turkey) Ferhat Kiraz	Boluspor	12
5	(Turkey) Tiago Bezerra	Karşıyaka	10
5	(Turkey) Adem Büyük	Mersin İdman Yurdu	10
5	(Turkey) Mehmet Al	Çaykur Rizespor	10
5	(Cameroon) Severin Bikoko	Kayseri Erciyesspor	10
9	(Turkey) Erhan Şentürk	Kartalspor	8

== See also ==
- 2010–11 Türkiye Kupası
- 2010–11 Süper Lig
- 2010–11 TFF Second League
- 2010–11 TFF Third League
