= 2011–12 TFF 1. Lig =

49th season of second-tier football league in Turkey

1. Lig
- Season: 2011–12
- Champions: Akhisar Belediyespor
- Promoted: Akhisar Belediyespor; Elazığspor; Kasımpaşa
- Relegated: Sakaryaspor; Güngörenspor; Giresunspor
- Matches played: 306
- Goals scored: 747 (2.44 per match)
- Top goalscorer: Severin Bikoko (13 goals)

The 2011–12 TFF 1. Lig (referred to as the Bank Asya 1. Lig for sponsorship reasons) is the 11th season since the league was established in 2001 and 49th season of the second-level football league of Turkey since its establishment in 1963–64. The start date of the league was 14 August 2011 and end date is 13 May 2012.

== Teams ==
Kasımpaşa, Bucaspor and Konyaspor relegated from Süper Lig after the 31st week games of 2011–12 Süper Lig. Mersin İdman Yurdu, Samsunspor and Orduspor promoted to 2011–12 Süper Lig.

Göztepe, Sakaryaspor and Elazığspor promoted from TFF Second League. Altay and Diyarbakırspor relegated to 2011–12 TFF Second League.

Location of teams in TFF 1. Lig 2011–12

=== Team summaries ===
Team	Venue	Capacity	Kitmaker	President	Coach
Adanaspor	Adana 5 Ocak Stadium	14,085	Nike	Bayram Akgül	(Turkey) Levent Eriş
Akhisar Belediyespor	Akhisar Belediye Stadium	2,918	Adidas	Hüseyin Eryüksel	(Turkey) Hamza Hamzaoğlu
Boluspor	Bolu Atatürk Stadium	8,881	Lescon	Necip Çarıkçı	(Turkey) Cihat Arslan
Bucaspor	Buca Arena	10,000	Lotto	Şeref Üstündağ	(Turkey) Sait Karafırtınalar
Çaykur Rizespor	New Rize City Stadium	15,485	Umbro	Metin Kalkavan	(Turkey) Hüseyin Kalpar
Denizlispor	Denizli Atatürk Stadium	15,427	Lescon	Salih Amiroğlu	(Turkey) Güvenç Kurtar
Elazığspor	Elazığ Atatürk Stadium	13,923	Lotto	Akın Şatıroğlu	(Turkey) Bülent Uygun
Gaziantep Büyükşehir Belediyespor	Kamil Ocak Stadium	16,981	Lotto	Ünsal Göksen	(Turkey) Erol Azgın
Giresunspor	Giresun Atatürk Stadium	12,191	Lescon	Ömer Ülkü	(Turkey) Bahri Kaya
Göztepe	İzmir Alsancak Stadium	15,358	Lotto	İnan Altınbaş	(Turkey) Özcan Kızıltan
Güngörenspor	Mimar Yahya Baş Stadium	7,589	Umbro	Yahya Baş	(Turkey) Fahrettin Genç
Karşıyaka	İzmir Atatürk Stadium	51,295	Lotto	Hüseyin Çalışkan	(Turkey) Reha Kapsal
Kartalspor	Kartal City Stadium	7,195	Lotto	Binali Aydın	(Turkey) Besim Durmuş
Kasımpaşa	Recep Tayyip Erdoğan Stadium	9,576	Lescon	H. Hilmi Öksüz	(Turkey) Uğur Tütüneker
Kayseri Erciyesspor	B.B. Kadir Has Stadium	32,864	Lotto	Ziya Eren	(Turkey) Fikret Yılmaz
Konyaspor	BŞ Bld Atatürk Stadium	22,559	Lotto	Bahattin Karapınar	(Turkey) Osman Özdemir
Sakaryaspor	Sakarya Atatürk Stadium	13,216	Lotto	Rauf Batuboylu	(Turkey) Şaban Yıldırım
TKİ Tavşanlı Linyitspor	Tavşanlı Ada City Stadium	3,000	Lotto	Mustafa Çokuslu	(Turkey) Coşkun Demibakan

=== Managerial changes ===
Before the start of the season

Team	Outgoing manager	Manner of departure	Date of vacancy	Replaced by	Date of appointment
Çaykur Rizespor	Ümit Kayıhan	Contract ended	31 May 2011	Hüseyin Kalpar	18 May 2011
Kasımpaşa	Fuat Çapa	Contract ended	31 May 2011	Uğur Tütüneker	30 May 2011
Adanaspor	Eyüp Arın	Contract ended	31 May 2011	Levent Eriş	31 May 2011
Güngören Belediyespor	Metin Altınay	Contract ended	31 May 2011	Fahrettin Genç	1 June 2011
Kartalspor	Engin Korukır	Contract ended	31 May 2011	Besim Durmuş	3 June 2011
TKİ Tavşanlı Linyitspor	Mustafa Akçay	Contract ended	31 May 2011	Coşkun Demirbakan	10 June 2011
Boluspor	Hüsnü Özkara	Contract ended	31 May 2011	Cihat Arslan	11 June 2011
Kayseri Erciyesspor	Ergün Penbe	Contract ended	31 May 2011	Fikret Yılmaz	15 June 2011
Denizlispor	Kenan Atik	Contract ended	31 May 2011	Güvenç Kurtar	23 June 2011
Konyaspor	Yılmaz Vural	Contract ended	31 May 2011	Osman Özdemir	1 July 2011

After the start of the season

Team	Outgoing manager	Manner of departure	Date of vacancy	Replaced by	Date of appointment

=== Foreign players ===
Club	Player 1	Player 2	Player 3	Player 4	Former Players
Adanaspor	(Cameroon) Marc Mbamba	(Cameroon) Mbilla Etame			(Nigeria) Fredrick Okwara
Akhisar Belediyespor	(Brazil) Diego Lima	(Nigeria) Gideon Sani			
Boluspor	(France) Landry Matondo	(Senegal) Emmanuel Gomis	(Senegal) Omar Wade		(Ivory Coast) Eugène Kouamé
Bucaspor	(Ghana) Kabiru Imoro				(Brazil) Leandrão (Ghana) Torric Jebrin
Çaykur Rizespor	(Albania) Hair Zeqiri	(Cameroon) Severin Bikoko	(The Gambia) Ousman Jallow		
Denizlispor	(England) Eric Odhiambo	(Guinea) Mohamed Sakho	(Ivory Coast) Gerard Gohou		
Elazığspor					
Gaziantep Büyükşehir Belediyespor					
Giresunspor	(Croatia) Vilim Posinković	(Ghana) Emmanuel Banahene			(Brazil) Boka
Göztepe	(Liberia) Theo Lewis Weeks	(South Africa) Bradley Grobler			(Ghana) Bismark Idan
Güngörenspor	(Ghana) Benjamin Boateng	(Ghana) Obed Owusu	(Ghana) Paul Aidoo		
Karşıyaka	(Nigeria) Akeem Agbetu	(Nigeria) Oliver Ogbonnaya	(Uzbekistan) Azizullo Mahmudov		(Ghana) Dominic Adiyiah (Kyrgyzstan) Karim Izrailov
Kartalspor	(Brazil) Deyvison	(North Macedonia) Muzafer Ejupi			(Guinea) Boubacar Fofana
Kasımpaşa	(Brazil) Luiz Henrique	(Bulgaria) Georgi Sarmov	(Bulgaria) Nikolay Dimitrov	(Chile) Juan Robledo	(Morocco) Nourdin Boukhari
Kayseri Erciyesspor	(Algeria) Sofiane Hanni	(Azerbaijan) Amit Guluzade	(Senegal) Insa Sylla	(Uganda) Hassan Wasswa	(Croatia) Vilim Posinković
Konyaspor	(Burkina Faso) Mahamoudou Kéré	(Poland) Marcin Robak	(Poland) Mariusz Pawełek	(Spain) Álvaro Mejía	
Sakaryaspor					
TKİ Tavşanlı Linyitspor	(France) Souhalio Toure	(Nigeria) Kingsley Nwankwo			(Nigeria) Kazeem Ahmed

== League table ==
Pos	Team	Pld	W	D	L	GF	GA	GD	Pts	Qualification or relegation
1	Akhisar Belediyespor (C, P)	34	17	12	5	46	28	+18	63	Promotion to Süper Lig
2	Elazığspor (P)	34	18	7	9	45	30	+15	61	Promotion to Süper Lig
3	Çaykur Rizespor	34	16	11	7	52	44	+8	59	Qualification for Promotion Playoffs
4	Kasımpaşa (O, P)	34	16	11	7	50	39	+11	59	Qualification for Promotion Playoffs
5	Konyaspor	34	16	11	7	35	25	+10	59	Qualification for Promotion Playoffs
6	Adanaspor	34	14	11	9	46	32	+14	53	Qualification for Promotion Playoffs
7	Boluspor	34	13	12	9	40	33	+7	51	
8	Kayseri Erciyesspor	34	12	10	12	43	39	+4	46	
9	Kartalspor	34	11	12	11	37	32	+5	45	
10	Denizlispor	34	11	12	11	51	46	+5	45	
11	TKİ Tavşanlı Linyitspor	34	12	7	15	42	39	+3	43	
12	Bucaspor	34	12	7	15	45	53	−8	43	
13	Göztepe A.Ş.	34	11	8	15	36	43	−7	41	
14	Gaziantep B.B.	34	9	13	12	36	37	−1	40	
15	Karşıyaka	34	10	9	15	31	37	−6	39	
16	Giresunspor (R)	34	8	15	11	39	48	−9	39	Relegation to TFF Second League
17	Sakaryaspor (R)	34	4	9	21	31	66	−35	21	Relegation to TFF Second League
18	Güngörenspor (R)	34	2	11	21	24	58	−34	17	Relegation to TFF Second League

Source: TFF 1. Lig page
Rules for classification: 1) points; 2) goal difference; 3) number of goals scored.
(C) Champions; (O) Play-off winners; (P) Promoted; (R) Relegated

== Positions by round ==
Team ╲ Round	1	2	3	4	5	6	7	8	9	10	11	12	13	14	15	16	17	18	19	20	21	22	23	24	25	26	27	28	29	30	31	32	33	34
Akhisar Belediyespor	4	3	9	6	8	4	2	7	6	4	3	3	4	2	3	4	2	3	4	4	3	4	3	3	4	3	2	2	2	2	5	3	2	1
Elazığspor	16	6	4	9	10	5	8	6	2	1	4	4	2	3	1	1	1	1	1	1	1	1	1	1	1	1	1	1	1	1	1	1	1	2
Çaykur Rizespor	11	1	7	4	2	6	4	3	3	2	1	1	1	1	2	2	4	5	5	6	6	6	6	5	5	5	5	5	5	5	4	5	3	3
Kasımpaşa	12	12	5	2	7	3	5	8	8	5	5	5	6	5	5	3	3	2	2	2	2	2	2	2	2	2	3	3	3	4	3	2	4	4
Konyaspor	13	14	16	15	11	13	9	9	9	6	6	7	7	6	7	6	6	7	6	5	4	3	4	4	3	4	4	4	4	3	2	4	5	5
Adanaspor	1	7	2	1	4	8	12	11	11	12	12	12	11	9	11	9	9	12	12	10	11	10	11	8	7	8	7	7	7	7	6	6	6	6
Boluspor	9	2	1	3	1	1	1	2	4	7	7	8	5	7	6	7	7	4	3	3	5	5	5	7	8	6	6	6	6	6	7	7	7	7
Kayseri Erciyesspor	6	11	6	8	5	2	3	1	1	3	2	2	3	4	4	5	5	6	7	9	7	7	7	6	6	7	9	8	8	8	8	8	8	8
Kartalspor	5	4	10	10	9	9	6	4	5	9	9	6	8	8	10	12	11	13	13	13	13	12	10	10	9	9	10	9	11	11	11	9	10	9
Denizlispor	2	9	15	13	15	16	16	17	17	17	17	15	15	15	15	15	15	15	15	15	15	14	14	14	15	15	15	14	13	10	10	11	9	10
TKİ Tavşanlı Linyitspor	15	5	3	7	3	7	10	10	10	10	10	9	9	11	13	14	12	10	8	11	12	13	13	13	13	13	14	15	15	15	15	15	13	11
Bucaspor	7	17	11	11	13	11	11	12	12	8	8	10	12	12	8	8	8	8	10	8	10	11	12	11	11	10	11	12	9	9	9	10	11	12
Göztepe A.Ş.	14	15	8	5	6	12	13	13	14	14	13	13	13	10	12	13	14	14	14	14	14	15	15	15	14	14	13	13	14	14	14	14	12	13
Gaziantep B.B.	10	13	13	12	12	10	7	5	7	11	11	11	10	13	9	10	10	9	11	12	8	8	9	12	12	11	8	10	10	12	12	12	14	14
Karşıyaka	18	18	17	17	18	14	14	14	13	13	14	14	14	14	14	11	13	11	9	7	9	9	8	9	10	12	12	11	12	13	13	13	15	15
Giresunspor	8	10	12	14	14	15	15	15	15	15	15	16	17	17	17	17	17	17	17	17	17	16	16	16	16	16	16	16	16	16	16	16	16	16
Sakaryaspor	3	8	14	16	16	17	18	16	16	16	16	17	16	16	16	16	16	16	16	16	16	17	17	17	17	17	17	17	17	17	17	17	17	17
Güngörenspor	17	16	18	18	17	18	17	18	18	18	18	18	18	18	18	18	18	18	18	18	18	18	18	18	18	18	18	18	18	18	18	18	18	18

Source: TFF 1. Lig page

== Results ==
Home \ Away	ADA	AKH	BOL	BUC	ÇYR	DEN	ELA	GBB	GRS	GÖZ	GÜN	KSK	KRT	KAS	KER	KON	SAK	TAV
Adanaspor		0–1	0–0	4–0	0–2	2–2	2–0	3–0	2–1	4–3	2–0	0–1	2–1	0–0	2–1	0–0	2–2	1–0
Akhisar Belediyespor	1–1		0–0	0–1	3–0	3–3	0–0	1–1	1–1	1–0	0–0	3–0	0–0	2–2	2–0	1–1	2–0	1–0
Boluspor	1–0	2–1		0–0	1–4	2–3	2–2	0–1	2–0	0–1	0–0	1–0	1–0	0–1	1–2	1–2	2–1	1–0
Bucaspor	2–2	1–3	0–2		0–1	5–2	2–1	2–1	2–1	1–2	2–1	2–0	0–2	3–3	1–1	0–0	3–0	2–7
Çaykur Rizespor	1–1	1–2	2–2	0–0		3–1	3–5	0–0	1–1	2–3	0–0	2–1	2–1	4–2	0–2	2–2	1–0	2–1
Denizlispor	3–1	2–3	2–0	1–0	1–1		0–1	0–0	6–1	2–1	3–1	0–0	1–1	0–3	1–1	1–2	4–0	1–3
Elazığspor	1–0	1–0	2–0	2–1	0–2	2–0		0–1	3–0	3–0	3–2	0–2	1–0	2–1	0–0	1–0	3–0	3–0
Gaziantep B.B.	2–1	1–1	0–0	2–1	3–0	0–0	1–2		0–0	2–4	0–0	0–0	2–0	4–1	1–3	0–1	5–1	1–1
Giresunspor	0–0	3–1	1–1	3–0	1–1	0–3	0–0	2–2		0–0	6–2	3–2	1–0	0–0	2–1	0–0	1–3	0–0
Göztepe A.Ş.	1–0	0–1	0–1	1–2	1–1	1–1	1–0	0–1	1–1		3–1	1–1	0–2	1–2	2–1	1–0	1–1	0–0
İstanbul Güngörenspor	0–2	0–1	0–1	1–5	0–1	0–3	0–0	2–0	2–3	1–1		1–3	0–0	0–1	0–0	0–2	2–3	2–1
Karşıyaka	0–2	2–0	1–3	0–0	2–4	1–1	0–1	0–0	2–1	1–0	0–0		2–1	0–1	0–1	0–1	1–0	2–1
Kartalspor	0–2	0–1	1–1	1–0	1–2	3–1	1–0	2–1	3–1	2–0	2–2	2–0		1–1	1–2	3–2	1–1	1–1
Kasımpaşa	1–1	1–2	1–1	3–1	1–2	2–0	0–1	2–1	2–2	2–1	2–1	2–1	1–1		1–0	3–1	3–2	0–1
Kayseri Erciyesspor	2–1	2–3	1–2	1–3	4–0	1–1	1–1	2–1	1–0	4–2	2–0	1–1	0–0	2–2		0–0	2–0	1–2
Konyaspor	0–2	0–0	1–1	1–0	1–3	1–0	4–1	1–0	1–1	2–1	2–1	1–0	0–0	0–0	1–0		1–0	0–1
Sakaryaspor	2–3	1–3	2–7	1–2	0–0	0–0	3–3	0–0	1–2	0–1	2–2	1–1	0–2	1–2	2–1	0–2		1–0
TKİ Tavşanlı Linyitspor	1–1	1–2	1–1	3–1	1–2	1–2	1–0	4–2	2–0	0–1	2–0	0–4	1–1	0–1	3–0	1–2	1–0	

Source: TFF 1. Lig page
Legend: Blue = home team win; Yellow = draw; Red = away team win.

== Promotion playoffs ==
The teams ranked third through sixth will compete in the promotion playoffs for the 2012–13 Süper Lig. The 3rd team and 6th team will play two matches at home. Likewise 4th and 5th teams will play two matches elimination round. This round is named as semi-finals. Winner teams will play one final match at a neutral venue. Winner of the final will be third team to promote to Süper Lig 2012–2013.

Semi-finals 3–6

18 May 2012
Friday, 18:30

Adanaspor	3–1	Çaykur Rizespor
Barut 55'; Mbilla Etame 57', 60'		Jallow 62'

5 Ocak, Adana

22 May 2012
Tuesday, 18:30

Çaykur Rizespor	0–1	Adanaspor
		Yıldız 47'

New Rize City, Rize

Semi-finals 4–5

19 May 2012
Saturday, 18:30

Konyaspor	0–2	Kasımpaşa
		Büyük 74'; Dimitrov 82'

Atatürk, Konya

23 May 2012
Wednesday, 18:30

Kasımpaşa	4–0	Konyaspor
Dimitrov 17'; Büyük 45', 52', 67'

Recep Tayyip Erdoğan, İstanbul

Final

27 May 2012
Sunday, 19:00

Adanaspor	2–3 (a.e.t.)	Kasımpaşa
Oguz 67'; Mbilla Etame 90'		Güleç 37'; Büyük 72'; Karadas 117'

19 Mayıs, Ankara
Referee: Fırat Aydınus

== Season statistics ==
=== Top goalscorers ===
Rank	Player	Club	Goals
1	(Cameroon) Severin Bikoko	Çaykur Rizespor	18
2	(The Gambia) Ousman Jallow	Çaykur Rizespor	15
3	(Bulgaria) Nikolay Dimitrov	Kasımpaşa	12
3	(Turkey) Ümit Tütünci	Tavşanlı Linyitspor	12
5	(Turkey) Sertan Vardar	Akhisar Belediyespor	11
5	(Turkey) Sinan Özkan	Elazığspor	11

== See also ==
- 2011–12 Turkish Cup
- 2011–12 Süper Lig
- 2011–12 TFF Second League
- 2011–12 TFF Third League
