= 2009–10 Süper Lig =

52nd season of top-tier Turkish football

Turkcell Süper Lig
- Season: 2009–10
- Champions: Bursaspor; 1st title
- Relegated: Ankaraspor; Denizlispor; Diyarbakırspor
- Champions League: Bursaspor; Fenerbahçe
- Europa League: Galatasaray; Beşiktaş; Trabzonspor
- Matches: 272
- Goals: 644 (2.37 per match)
- Top goalscorer: Ariza Makukula (21)
- Biggest home win: Bursaspor 6–0 İstanbul B.B (24 October 2009)
- Biggest away win: İstanbul B.B 1–6 Trabzonspor (13 September 2009)
- Highest scoring: İstanbul B.B 1–6 Trabzonspor (13 September 2009); Galatasaray 4–3 Trabzonspor (18 October 2009) (7 goals each)

The 2009–10 Süper Lig (known as the Turkcell Süper Lig for sponsorship reasons) was the 52nd season since its establishment. The season commenced on 7 August 2009 with Istanbul B.B. hosting defending champions Beşiktaş at Atatürk Olympic Stadium. The last matches were played on 16 May 2010.

Bursaspor won the league beating defending champions Beşiktaş 2–1 at home. They beat second placed Fenerbahçe by just one point after they could only manage a 1–1 home draw against Trabzonspor. It was only the seventh time a club outside the Istanbul Big Three have won the league, with Trabzonspor being the only other team with six championships, winning their last title in 1984.

== Promotion and relegation from 2008–09 ==
Konyaspor, Kocaelispor and Hacettepe SK were relegated at the end of the 2008–09 season after finishing in the bottom three places of the standings. Konyaspor had to face demotion after six years in the highest Turkish football league. Kocaelispor returned to the First League after just one year in the Süper Lig, while Hacettepe ended a two-year stint in the Turkish top flight.

The relegated teams were replaced by 2008–09 TFF First League champions Manisaspor, runners-up Diyarbakırspor and promotion play-off winners Kasımpaşa. Manisaspor and Kasımpaşa made an immediate return to the Süper Lig while Diyarbakırspor returned after a three-year hiatus.

== Team overview ==
Location of (qualified) teams in Süper Lig 2009–10

Team	Head coach	Team captain	Venue	Capacity	Kitmaker	Shirt sponsor	Club Chairman
Ankaragücü	(France) Roger Lemerre	(Turkey) Hürriyet Güçer	Ankara 19 Mayıs Stadium	19,209	Lotto	Turkcell	Ahmet Gökçek
Ankaraspor	(Germany) Jürgen Röber	(Turkey) Hürriyet Güçer	Yenikent Asaş Stadium	19,626	Nike	Turkcell	Ruhi Kurnaz
Antalyaspor	(Turkey) Mehmet Özdilek	(Turkey) Ömer Çatkıç	Antalya Atatürk Stadium	11,137	Puma	Rixos Hotels	Hasan Akıncıoğlu
Beşiktaş	(Turkey) Mustafa Denizli	(Turkey) İbrahim Üzülmez	BJK İnönü Stadium	32,086	Adidas	Cola Turka	Yıldırım Demirören
Bursaspor	(Turkey) Ertuğrul Sağlam	(Turkey) Ömer Erdoğan	Bursa Atatürk Stadium	18,587	Puma	Turkcell	İbrahim Yazıcı
Denizlispor	(Turkey) Hakan Kutlu	(Turkey) Özden Öngün	Denizli Atatürk Stadium	15,427	Lescon	Turkcell	Ali İpek
Diyarbakırspor	(Turkey) Güvenç Kurtar	(Turkey) Barış Ataş	Diyarbakır Atatürk Stadium	12,963	Lescon	Turkcell	Çetin Sümer
Eskişehirspor	(Turkey) Rıza Çalımbay	(Turkey) Serdar Özbayraktar	Eskişehir Atatürk Stadium	13,520	Puma	Eti	Halil Ünal
Fenerbahçe	(Germany) Christoph Daum	(Brazil) Alex	Şükrü Saracoğlu Stadium	53,586	Adidas	Avea	Aziz Yıldırım
Galatasaray	(Netherlands) Frank Rijkaard	(Turkey) Arda Turan	Ali Sami Yen Stadium	52,800	Adidas	Türk Telekom	Adnan Polat
Gaziantepspor	(Portugal) José Couceiro	(Argentina) Christian Rodrigo Zurita	Gaziantep Kamil Ocak Stadium	16,981	Diadora	Turkcell	İbrahim Halil Kızıl
Gençlerbirliği	(Germany) Thomas Doll	(Turkey) İlhan Eker	Ankara 19 Mayıs Stadium	19,209	Lotto	Turkcell	İlhan Cavcav
Istanbul B.B.	(Turkey) Abdullah Avcı	(Turkey) Okan Buruk	Atatürk Olympic Stadium	76,485	Nike	Turkcell	Göksel Gümüşdağ
Kasımpaşa	(Turkey) Yılmaz Vural	(Turkey) Tolga Özgen	Recep Tayyip Erdoğan Stadium	9,576	Lotto	Turkcell	Hasan Hilmi Öksüz
Kayserispor	(Turkey) Tolunay Kafkas	(Turkey) Aydın Toscalı	Kadir Has Stadium	32,864	Adidas	Turkcell	Recep Mamur
Manisaspor	(Turkey) Mesut Bakkal	(Turkey) Yiğit İncedemir	Manisa 19 Mayıs Stadium	14,965	Lescon	Vestel	Kenan Yaralı
Sivasspor	(Turkey) Muhsin Ertuğral	(Turkey) Mehmet Yildiz	Sivas 4 Eylül Stadium	14,998	Adidas	Turkcell	Mecnun Odyakmaz
Trabzonspor	(Turkey) Şenol Güneş	(Cameroon) Rigobert Song	Hüseyin Avni Aker Stadium	19,649	Nike	Türk Telekom	Sadri Şener

== Managerial changes ==
=== During summer break ===
Nine teams decided to change their head coach in the offseason, among them Fenerbahçe and Galatasaray.

Team	Outgoing manager	Manner of departure	Date of vacancy	Replaced by	Date of appointment
Diyarbakırspor	(Turkey) Coşkun Demirbakan	End of Contract	31 May 2009	(Turkey) Nurullah Sağlam	29 June 2009
Ankaraspor	(Turkey) Aykut Kocaman	End of Contract	31 May 2009	(Germany) Jürgen Röber	1 July 2009
Gençlerbirliği	(Turkey) Samet Aybaba	End of Contract	31 May 2009	(Germany) Thomas Doll	1 July 2009
Fenerbahçe	(Spain) Luis Aragonés	Sacked	2 June 2009	(Germany) Christoph Daum	1 July 2009
Galatasaray	(Turkey) Bülent Korkmaz	Resign	5 June 2009	(Netherlands) Frank Rijkaard	1 July 2009
Denizlispor	(Turkey) Mesut Bakkal	Sacked	8 June 2009	(Turkey) Erhan Altın	1 July 2009
Manisaspor	(Turkey) Levent Eriş	End of contract	18 June 2009	(Turkey) Mesut Bakkal	1 July 2009
Trabzonspor	(Turkey) Ahmet Özen	End of tenure as caretaker	30 June 2009	(Belgium) Hugo Broos	1 July 2009
Diyarbakirspor	(Turkey) Nurullah Sağlam	Resign	7 July 2009	(Turkey) Ziya Doğan	8 July 2009

=== After start of the 2009–10 season ===
Team	Outgoing manager	Manner of departure	Date of vacancy	Replaced by	Date of appointment
Denizlispor	(Turkey) Erhan Altın	Sacked	1 September 2009	(Turkey) Nurullah Sağlam	2 September 2009
Kasımpaşa	(Turkey) Besim Durmuş	Sacked	3 September 2009	(Turkey) Yılmaz Vural	4 September 2009
Sivasspor	(Turkey) Bülent Uygun	Resign	4 October 2009	(Turkey) Muhsin Ertuğral	8 October 2009
Denizlispor	(Turkey) Nurullah Sağlam	Resign	18 October 2009	(Turkey) Hakan Kutlu	28 October 2009
Ankaragücü	(Turkey) Hikmet Karaman	Sacked	12 November 2009	(France) Roger Lemerre	22 December 2009
Trabzonspor	(Belgium) Hugo Broos	Sacked	22 November 2009	(Turkey) Şenol Güneş	28 November 2009

=== Foreign players ===
Club	Player 1	Player 2	Player 3	Player 4	Player 5	Player 6	Player 7	Player 8	Former Players
Ankaragücü	(Argentina) Ariel Broggi	(Cameroon) Geremi	(Czech Republic) Jan Rajnoch	(England) Darius Vassell	(France) Jérôme Rothen	(Liberia) Theo Lewis Weeks	(Slovakia) Marek Sapara	(Slovakia) Róbert Vittek	(Argentina) Leonardo Iglesias (Cameroon) Gustave Bebbe (Czech Republic) Erich Brabec (England) Ian Henderson (Gabon) Roguy Méyé (Senegal) Madiou Konate (Slovakia) Štefan Senecký (Sweden) Fredrik Risp
Ankaraspor	(Gabon) Roguy Méyé								(Brazil) Tita (Czech Republic) Erich Brabec (Portugal) Neca (Slovakia) Štefan Senecký
Antalyaspor	(Australia) Mile Jedinak	(Brazil) Tita	(Ivory Coast) Serge Djiéhoua	(Montenegro) Radoslav Batak	(Tunisia) Ali Zitouni				
Beşiktaş	(Brazil) Bobô	(Brazil) Rodrigo Tabata	(Chile) Rodrigo Tello	(Czech Republic) Tomáš Sivok	(Germany) Fabian Ernst	(Germany) Michael Fink	(Italy) Matteo Ferrari	(Slovakia) Filip Hološko	
Bursaspor	(Argentina) Leonardo Iglesias	(Argentina) Pablo Batalla	(Bulgaria) Dimitar Ivankov	(Czech Republic) Tomáš Zápotočný	(Romania) Giani Kiriță	(Serbia) Ivan Ergić			(Brazil) Tadeu (South Korea) Shin Young-rok
Denizlispor	(Benin) Damien Chrysostome	(Bosnia and Herzegovina) Branimir Bajić	(Bosnia and Herzegovina) Džemal Berberović	(Brazil) Douglas	(Bulgaria) Emil Angelov	(Guinea) Ibrahima Bangoura	(Guinea) Souleymane Youla	(Trinidad and Tobago) Darryl Roberts	(Guinea) Norman Sylla
Diyarbakırspor	(Australia) Bruce Djite	(Cameroon) Gustave Bebbe	(Equatorial Guinea) Thierry Fidjeu	(Guinea) Mamadou Diallo	(Iraq) Bassim Abbas	(Namibia) Razundara Tjikuzu	(North Macedonia) Goran Stankovski	(Serbia) Milan Martinović	(Cameroon) Joseph-Désiré Job (Ecuador) Rorys Aragón (Egypt) Amir Azmy (Denmark) Mikkel Rask (Peru) Andrés Mendoza
Eskişehirspor	(Bahrain) Jojo	(Bosnia and Herzegovina) Safet Nadarević	(Croatia) Luka Vučko	(Croatia) Vanja Iveša					(Guinea) Souleymane Youla
Fenerbahçe	(Brazil) Alex	(Brazil) André Santos	(Brazil) Cristian	(Brazil) Deivid	(Brazil) Fábio Bilica	(Spain) Dani Güiza	(Uruguay) Diego Lugano		(Brazil) Roberto Carlos
Galatasaray	(Argentina) Leo Franco	(Australia) Harry Kewell	(Australia) Lucas Neill	(Brazil) Elano	(Brazil) Jô	(Czech Republic) Milan Baroš	(Ivory Coast) Kader Keïta	(Mexico) Giovani dos Santos	(Brazil) Lincoln (Democratic Republic of the Congo) Shabani Nonda (Sweden) Tobias Linderoth
Gaziantepspor	(Argentina) Christian Zurita	(Brazil) Beto	(Brazil) Ivan	(Brazil) Jorginho	(Brazil) Júlio César	(Cameroon) Armand Deumi	(Croatia) Stjepan Tomas	(Lithuania) Žydrūnas Karčemarskas	(Austria) Roland Linz (Brazil) Júlio César (Brazil) Rodrigo Tabata
Gençlerbirliği	(Bosnia and Herzegovina) Ivan Radeljić	(Brazil) Kahê	(Brazil) Sandro	(Brazil) Tozo	(Croatia) Jurica Vranješ	(Democratic Republic of the Congo) Patiyo Tambwe	(Sweden) Labinot Harbuzi		(Australia) Bruce Djite (Australia) Mile Jedinak (Cameroon) Jacques Momha
Istanbul B.B.	(Bosnia and Herzegovina) Kenan Hasagić	(Brazil) Marcus Vinícius	(Brazil) Marquinhos	(Cameroon) Hervé Tum	(Democratic Republic of the Congo) Mazowa N'sumbu	(Guinea) Kanfory Sylla	(Poland) Marcin Kuś		
Kasımpaşa	(Argentina) Diego Ruiz	(Brazil) André Moritz	(Denmark) Christian Keller	(Morocco) Nourdin Boukhari	(Slovakia) Martin Baran				(Brazil) André Galiassi (Czech Republic) Petr Bolek (Czech Republic) Petr Pavlík
Kayserispor	(Argentina) Franco Cángele	(Australia) James Troisi	(Cameroon) Alioum Saidou	(Cameroon) Souleymanou Hamidou	(Egypt) Mohamed Shawky	(Paraguay) Delio Toledo	(Portugal) Makukula		(Cameroon) Salomon Olembé
Manisaspor	(Brazil) Gabriel	(Cameroon) Jacques Momha	(Canada) Josh Simpson	(Guinea) Oumar Kalabane	(Liberia) Jimmy Dixon	(Nigeria) Isaac Promise			(Bosnia and Herzegovina) Vlastimir Jovanović (Brazil) Reinaldo (Burkina Faso) Rahim Ouédraogo
Sivasspor	(Australia) Michael Petkovic	(Republic of the Congo) Lucien Aubey	(France) Yannick Kamanan	(Gabon) Bruno Mbanangoyé	(Mali) Souleymane Keïta	(Nigeria) Akeem Agbetu	(South Africa) Elrio van Heerden	(Tunisia) Nabil Taïder	(Algeria) Hamer Bouazza (Democratic Republic of the Congo) Pieter Mbemba
Trabzonspor	(Argentina) Gustavo Colman	(Brazil) Alanzinho	(Cameroon) Rigobert Song	(Colombia) Teófilo Gutiérrez	(Croatia) Drago Gabrić	(Croatia) Hrvoje Čale	(Senegal) Tony Sylva		(Namibia) Razundara Tjikuzu

== League table ==
Pos	Team	Pld	W	D	L	GF	GA	GD	Pts	Qualification or relegation
1	Bursaspor (C)	34	23	6	5	65	26	+39	75	Qualification to Champions League group stage
2	Fenerbahçe	34	23	5	6	61	28	+33	74	Qualification to Champions League third qualifying round
3	Galatasaray	34	19	7	8	61	35	+26	64 (Note: Galatasaray finished ahead of Beşiktaş on head-to-head record: Galatasaray–Beşiktaş 3–0, Beşiktaş–Galatasaray 1–1.)	Qualification to Europa League third qualifying round
4	Beşiktaş	34	18	10	6	47	25	+22	64	Qualification to Europa League second qualifying round
5	Trabzonspor	34	16	9	9	53	32	+21	57	Qualification to Europa League play-off round (Note: Trabzonspor won the 2009–10 Turkish Cup and thus qualified for the play-off round of the UEFA Europa League.)
6	İstanbul B.B.	34	16	8	10	47	44	+3	56	
7	Eskişehirspor	34	15	10	9	44	34	+10	55	
8	Kayserispor	34	14	9	11	45	37	+8	51	
9	Antalyaspor	34	14	7	13	49	38	+11	49	
10	Gençlerbirliği	34	12	11	11	38	35	+3	47	
11	Kasımpaşa	34	10	11	13	50	53	−3	41 (Note: Kasımpaşa finished ahead of Ankaragücü on head-to-head record: Kasımpaşa–Ankaragücü 2–0, Ankaragücü–Kasımpaşa 2–2.)	
12	MKE Ankaragücü	34	9	14	11	39	40	−1	41	
13	Gaziantepspor	34	9	13	12	38	39	−1	40	
14	Manisaspor	34	8	13	13	27	34	−7	37	
15	Sivasspor	34	8	10	16	42	59	−17	34	
16	Diyarbakırspor (R)	34	6	9	19	28	54	−26	27	Relegation to TFF First League
17	Denizlispor (R)	34	6	8	20	30	49	−19	26	Relegation to TFF First League
18	Ankaraspor (R)	34	0	0	34	0	102	−102	0 (Note: On 7 October 2009, the Turkish Football Federation relegated Ankaraspor to the TFF First League with immediate effect due to the relationship of its governors with those of Ankaragücü being unsuitable for two teams competing in the same division. All of Ankaraspor's matches were scratched and counted as a 3–0 win for their opponents.)	Relegation to TFF First League

Source: Süper Lig official website
Rules for classification: 1st overall points, 2nd head-to-head points, 3rd head-to-head goal differential, 4th overall goal differential, 5th overall goals scored.
(C) Champions; (R) Relegated

== Positions by round ==
Team ╲ Round	1	2	3	4	5	6	7	8	9	10	11	12	13	14	15	16	17	18	19	20	21	22	23	24	25	26	27	28	29	30	31	32	33	34
Bursaspor	5	9	4	6	11	7	4	3	3	2	3	4	4	3	5	4	3	3	3	3	3	2	2	1	1	1	1	1	1	1	2	2	2	1
Fenerbahçe	2	1	2	2	2	2	1	1	1	1	1	1	1	1	2	2	1	1	1	1	2	3	3	3	4	3	2	2	2	2	1	1	1	2
Galatasaray	3	2	1	1	1	1	2	2	2	3	2	2	2	4	4	3	2	2	2	2	1	1	1	2	2	2	4	4	3	3	3	3	3	3
Beşiktaş	8	5	7	9	12	12	9	8	7	5	4	3	3	2	3	5	5	5	5	4	4	5	4	4	3	4	3	3	4	4	4	4	4	4
Trabzonspor	4	10	12	13	10	6	7	7	9	8	6	9	9	8	7	6	6	6	6	6	6	6	6	6	5	5	5	5	5	5	5	5	5	5
İstanbul B.B.	9	4	6	8	13	13	11	9	8	10	7	6	8	7	9	9	8	10	8	9	10	9	8	8	8	8	8	8	6	7	6	6	6	6
Eskişehirspor	10	7	8	4	5	4	5	6	6	7	8	7	7	9	8	8	9	7	9	7	7	7	7	7	7	6	7	6	7	8	7	7	7	7
Kayserispor	13	13	14	11	6	5	6	4	4	4	5	5	5	5	1	1	4	4	4	5	5	4	5	5	6	7	6	7	8	6	8	8	8	8
Antalyaspor	1	8	3	7	4	9	10	13	10	9	10	11	11	10	10	10	10	8	10	10	11	11	11	11	9	10	10	11	12	11	10	9	9	9
Gençlerbirliği	12	3	5	3	3	3	3	5	5	6	9	8	6	6	6	7	7	9	7	8	9	8	9	10	11	9	9	9	9	9	9	10	10	10
Kasımpaşa	16	15	17	17	17	17	17	16	16	15	15	15	14	13	14	14	12	12	12	12	12	12	12	12	12	12	12	13	11	13	13	13	11	11
MKE Ankaragücü	6	11	13	14	14	15	14	11	13	11	13	12	12	12	12	13	15	14	13	13	13	14	13	13	13	13	13	12	13	12	12	11	12	12
Gaziantepspor	14	14	10	10	7	11	13	12	11	12	11	10	10	11	11	11	11	11	11	11	8	10	10	9	10	11	11	10	10	10	11	12	13	13
Manisaspor	11	12	9	12	8	8	8	10	12	14	12	13	13	15	13	12	13	15	14	16	16	16	15	14	14	14	14	14	14	14	14	14	14	14
Sivasspor	15	16	15	15	16	16	16	17	17	16	16	16	16	16	16	16	16	16	16	15	15	13	14	15	15	16	15	15	15	15	15	15	15	15
Diyarbakırspor	7	6	11	5	9	10	12	14	14	13	14	14	15	14	15	15	14	13	15	14	14	15	16	16	16	15	16	16	16	16	16	16	16	16
Denizlispor	17	17	16	16	15	14	15	15	15	17	17	17	17	17	17	17	17	17	17	17	17	17	17	17	17	17	17	17	17	17	17	17	17	17
Ankaraspor	18	18	18	18	18	18	18	18	18	18	18	18	18	18	18	18	18	18	18	18	18	18	18	18	18	18	18	18	18	18	18	18	18	18

Source: tff.org (in Turkish)

== Results ==
Home \ Away	MKE	ANS	ANT	BEŞ	BUR	DEN	DYB	ESK	FEN	GAL	GAZ	GEN	İBB	KSM	KAY	MAN	SİV	TRA
MKE Ankaragücü		3–0	2–2	0–0	0–0	1–0	0–0	3–1	0–3	3–0	0–0	1–2	2–2	2–2	3–0	1–1	2–3	1–0
Ankaraspor	0–3		0–3	0–3	0–3	0–3	0–3	0–3	0–3	0–3	0–3	0–3	0–3	0–3	0–3	0–3	0–3	0–3
Antalyaspor	1–0	3–0		0–1	1–1	2–1	4–1	1–2	1–2	2–3	1–0	2–0	1–3	2–0	4–0	0–0	3–0	1–1
Beşiktaş	1–0	3–0	2–0		2–3	1–0	0–0	3–2	3–0	1–1	0–0	4–1	2–0	2–1	0–1	2–0	2–2	0–0
Bursaspor	1–0	3–0	2–1	2–1		2–1	4–0	3–1	0–1	1–0	2–0	1–2	6–0	2–1	2–0	2–0	3–0	1–1
Denizlispor	0–0	3–0	1–1	0–1	2–3		0–0	1–0	0–2	1–2	1–1	2–0	0–1	3–3	1–0	1–1	1–1	0–1
Diyarbakırspor	2–2	3–0	1–0	1–3	0–3 (Note: Bursaspor were awarded a 3–0 win after the match was abandoned in the 17th minute with the score level at 0–0 after Diyarbakırspor fans pelted Bursaspor players and officials with various objects.)	0–2		0–2	1–3	1–2	1–3	1–0	1–3	2–2	0–3	0–0	1–1	1–2
Eskişehirspor	0–0	3–0	2–1	0–1	3–2	2–0	0–0		2–1	2–1	3–2	0–0	2–1	2–0	0–1	1–0	1–1	1–0
Fenerbahçe	3–2	3–0	1–0	1–0	2–3	3–1	1–1	2–0		3–1	1–0	3–0	1–0	1–3	2–0	2–1	3–0	1–1
Galatasaray	3–0	3–0	1–2	3–0	0–0	4–1	4–1	1–1	0–1		1–0	1–0	1–1	4–1	4–1	1–1	2–0	4–3
Gaziantepspor	1–3	3–0	1–1	2–0	0–1	2–1	2–1	1–1	2–1	2–3		1–1	2–3	1–0	0–1	0–0	2–2	1–1
Gençlerbirliği	0–1	3–0	0–2	0–0	0–0	2–0	1–0	2–2	0–0	2–1	1–1		3–1	0–2	0–0	0–2	2–0	2–2
İstanbul B.B.	1–1	3–0	1–0	1–1	2–1	3–1	1–0	0–0	2–1	0–1	1–1	1–3		4–2	1–2	1–0	1–0	1–6
Kasımpaşa	2–0	3–0	2–2	2–2	0–2	3–1	1–0	1–1	0–1	1–3	3–0	0–4	1–3		2–2	3–1	2–2	3–1
Kayserispor	3–0	3–0	1–2	1–2	3–0	3–0	2–0	1–2	1–1	0–0	1–1	1–1	1–1	0–0		1–2	2–2	1–0
Manisaspor	0–0	3–0	1–2	1–1	0–2	0–0	2–1	0–0	2–2	1–2	0–3	0–0	1–0	0–0	0–1		3–1	1–0
Sivasspor	3–3	3–0	2–0	0–1	1–3	2–0	0–2	2–1	1–5	1–1	3–0	0–2	0–1	1–1	2–4	1–0		1–2
Trabzonspor	3–0	3–0	3–1	0–2	1–1	2–1	1–2	2–1	0–1	1–0	0–0	3–1	0–0	2–0	2–1	3–0	3–1	

Legend: Blue = home team win; Yellow = draw; Red = away team win.

== Top scorers ==
Source: Süper Lig official website

Rank	Scorer	Club	Goals
1	(Portugal) Ariza Makukula	Kayserispor	21
2	(Brazil) Júlio César	Gaziantepspor	13
3	(Brazil) Bobô	Beşiktaş	12
3	(Turkey) Necati Ateş	Antalyaspor	12
5	(Turkey) Umut Bulut	Trabzonspor	11
5	(Brazil) Alex	Fenerbahçe	11
5	(Czech Republic) Milan Baroš	Galatasaray	11
5	(Turkey) Mustafa Pektemek	Gençlerbirliği	11
5	(Spain) Dani Güiza	Fenerbahçe	11
10	(Turkey) İskender Alın	İstanbul B.B.	10

=== Hat-tricks ===
Player	For	Against	Result	Date
(Turkey) Egemen Korkmaz	Trabzonspor	İstanbul BB	6–1	13 September 2009
(Democratic Republic of the Congo) Shabani Nonda	Galatasaray	Kasımpaşa	3–1	21 September 2009
(Czech Republic) Milan Baroš	Galatasaray	Diyarbakırspor	4–1	11 April 2010

== See also ==
- 2009–10 Türkiye Kupası
- 2009–10 TFF First League
