= List of Akhisarspor managers =

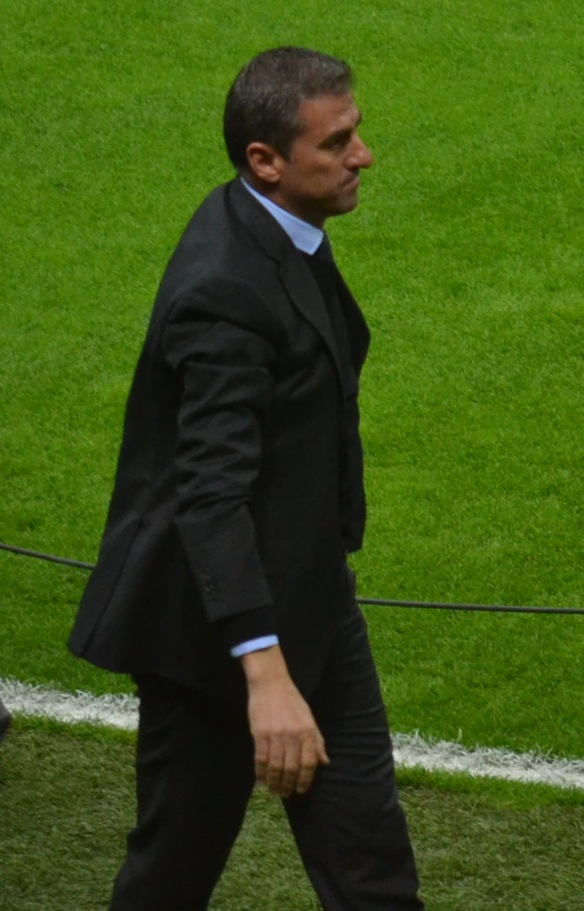
Hamza Hamzaoğlu won the 2011–12 TFF First League with Akhisarspor, the club's first ever major trophy.

This is a list of Akhisarspor's managers and their respective honours, from 2000, when the first professional manager was appointed, to the present day.

== Managerial history ==
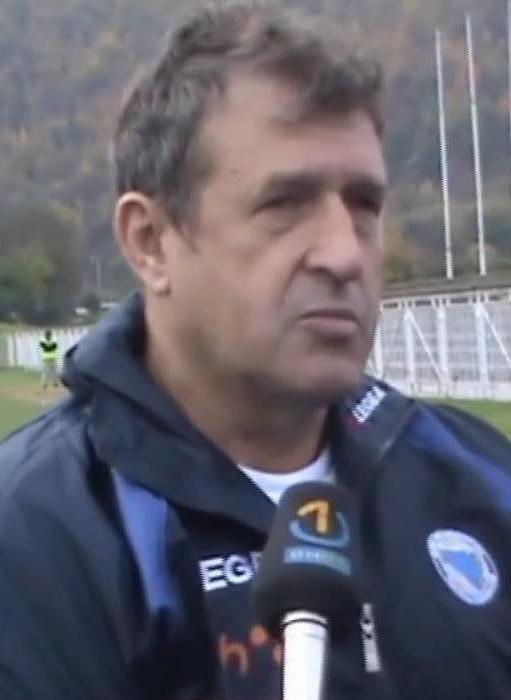
Safet Sušić won the club's first ever Turkish Super Cup in 2018.

| Name | Nat. | From | To | Honours |
|---|---|---|---|---|
| Adnan Özbağcı | (Turkey) | 7 June 2000 | 6 October 2000 | |
| Can Cangök | (Turkey) | 12 October 2000 | 30 June 2003 | |
| Turgut Uçar | (Turkey) | 7 August 2003 | 30 June 2004 | |
| Atilla Özcan | (Turkey) | 13 April 2005 | 20 February 2006 | |
| Mustafa Serin | (Turkey) | 29 August 2006 | 16 October 2006 | |
| Atilla Özcan | (Turkey) | 18 October 2006 | 1 March 2011 | |
| Hamza Hamzaoğlu | (Turkey) | 3 March 2011 | 30 June 2014 | TFF First League (1) |
| Mustafa Reşit Akçay | (Turkey) | 1 July 2014 | 29 December 2014 | |
| Roberto Carlos | (Brazil) | 3 January 2015 | 1 June 2015 | |
| Cihat Arslan | (Turkey) | 1 July 2015 | 1 September 2016 | |
| Tolunay Kafkas | (Turkey) | 6 September 2016 | 18 March 2017 | |
| Okan Buruk | (Turkey) | 23 March 2017 | 30 June 2018 | Turkish Cup (1) |
| Safet Sušić | (Bosnia and Herzegovina) | 30 June 2018 | 17 September 2018 | Turkish Super Cup (1) |
| Cihat Arslan | (Turkey) | 25 September 2018 | 13 February 2019 | |
| Cem Kavçak | (Turkey) | 13 February 2019 | 30 June 2019 | |
| Mehmet Altıparmak | (Turkey) | 26 June 2019 | 27 January 2020 | |
| Yılmaz Vural | (Turkey) | 28 January 2020 | 31 July 2020 | |
| Cem Kavçak | (Turkey) | 8 August 2020 | 31 August 2020 | |
| Ercan Kahyaoğlu | (Turkey) | 1 September 2020 | 9 December 2020 | |
| Mesut Dilsöz | (Turkey) | 10 December 2020 | 25 February 2021 | |
| Firat Gül | (Turkey) | 26 February 2021 | 15 March 2021 | |
| Mustafa Göksu | (Turkey) | 16 March 2021 | present | |
