= List of Bursaspor presidents =

Throughout its history, Bursaspor has seen a diverse range of presidents, each contributing to the club’s evolution on and off the pitch. Since its founding in 1963, the presidency has not only been a leadership position but also a symbol of local pride and sporting ambition in Bursa. Several presidents, such as İbrahim Yazıcı, Cavit Çağlar, and Levent Kızıl, left a lasting legacy by guiding the club to league championships and national cups. Yazıcı notably presided over Bursaspor’s historic 2009–10 Süper Lig title—the first and only in the club’s history. Meanwhile, figures like Muzaffer Başyatmaz and Orhan Özselek oversaw crucial promotions from lower divisions, while Mesut Mestan brought success in basketball by winning the second-tier league in 2019. More recently, Enes Çelik became the youngest elected president and led the club back to success in the 3. Lig in 2024.

== Presidents ==
№	Name	Years in Office	Football							Basketball			
№	Name	Years in Office	Leagues				Cups			Leagues		Cups	
№	Name	Years in Office	SL	1L	2L	3L	TC	SC	PC	SL	1L	TK	PC
1	Salih Kiracıbaşı	1963–65											
2	Muzaffer Başyatmaz	1965–67		W									
3	Hayri Terzioğlu	1967–68											
4	Talat Diniz	1969–73							W				
5	Şükrü Şankaya	1973–74											
6	Selahattin Kaya	1974–75											
7	Mümin Gençoğlu	1975–78											
9	Süleyman Kurtçu	1978–82											
10	Cavit Çağlar	1982–86					W						
11	Kadri Şankaya	1986–87											
12	Orhan Özselek	1987–88, 1992–93			W								
13	İbrahim Yazıcı	1988–92, 2007–13	W	W					W				
14	Murat Gülez	1993–95											
15	Hüseyin Silahçı	1995–96											
16	Remzi Cinoğlu	1996–98											
17	Kani Şen	1998–99											
18	Recep Günay	1999–00, 2023											
19	Erdoğan Bilenser	2000–03											
20	Fikret Üstenci	2003–04											
21	Hikmet Şahin	2004–05											
22	Erkan Körüstan	2005–05, 2013–14											
23	Levent Kızıl	2005–07		W									
24	Ali Karasu	2007											
25	Recep Bölükbaşı	2014–16											
26	Ali Ay	2016–19											
27	Mesut Mestan	2019–20									W		
28	Erkan Kamat	2020–21											
29	Hayrettin Gülgüler	2021–22											
30	Ömer Furkan Banaz	2022–23											
32	Sinan Bür	2024											
33	Enes Çelik	2024–present				W							
