= Nurullah Sağlam =

Turkish football manager (born 1966)

Personal information
- Date of birth: 28 January 1966 (age 60)
- Place of birth: Gaziantep, Turkey
- Position: Midfielder

Managerial career
- Years: Team
- 2003–2005: Gaziantepspor
- 2005–2006: Karşıyaka
- 2006: Denizlispor
- 2006–2007: Konyaspor
- 2008–2009: Gaziantepspor
- 2009–2010: Denizlispor
- 2010–2012: Mersin İdmanyurdu
- 2014: Gaziantep BB

Nurullah Sağlam (born 28 January 1966) is a UEFA Pro Licensed Turkish football manager.

He was also a footballer as defender and played for Gaziantepspor (1984–1990), Kayserispor (1990–1991), Elazığspor (1991–1992), Edirnespor (1992–1997) and İslahiyespor (1997–1999).

Nurullah became coach of Gaziantepspor, leading them to the third round of the UEFA Cup. They won the first leg 1–0 against Fabio Capello's Roma side, but in the second leg, Gaziantepspor fell to a 2–0 defeat and got knocked out of the competition.

Sağlam managed Diyarbakırspor for 2009–10 season. He became the champions of 2010–11 TFF First League with Mersin İdmanyurdu. At the end of the season, he signed a contract with Mersin İdmanyurdu for three seasons.
