= André Galiassi =

Brazilian footballer (born 1980)

Personal information
- Full name: André Felipe de Sousa Galiassi
- Date of birth: 22 August 1980 (age 46)
- Place of birth: São Paulo, Brazil
- Height: 1.85 m (6 ft 1 in)
- Position: Centre-back

Youth career
- Corinthians

Senior career*
Years	Team	Apps	(Gls)
2000–2003	Roma Apucarana		
2003–2004	River Plate		
2005	General Caballero	9	(1)
2005	Tacuary	2	(0)
2006	Bolívar	34	(0)
2007–2009	CFR Cluj	70	(3)
2009–2010	Kasımpaşa	3	(0)
2010	→ Unirea Alba Iulia (loan)	13	(1)
2011	Concordia Chiajna	2	(0)
Total		133	(5)
- * Club domestic league appearances and goals

André Felipe de Sousa Galiassi (22 August 1980) is a Brazilian retired professional footballer who played as a centre-back.

== Career ==
Galiassi was born on 22 August 1980 in São Paulo, Brazil and began playing junior-level football at Corinthians where he was teammates with future Brazilian international Kléber. He started his senior career by playing for Brazilian teams in the regional championships such as Roma Apucarana. Afterwards, he moved abroad, initially playing in Paraguay's top two leagues for River Plate, General Caballero and Tacuary. Subsequently, Galiassi went to Bolivia at Bolívar with whom he won the domestic league, and made appearances in continental competitions. Among these were six matches in the group phase of the 2006 Copa Libertadores.

Galiassi and teammate Miguel Cuéllar were transferred from Bolívar to Romanian side CFR Cluj which first paid €100,000 for Galiassi's loan, shortly afterwards paying another €400,000 for his permanent transfer. He made his Liga I debut on 24 February 2007 when coach Cristiano Bergodi introduced him at halftime to replace Romeo Surdu, managing to score a goal in the 63rd minute as CFR obtained a 1–1 draw against Ceahlăul Piatra Neamț. In the following season, Galiassi helped CFR win The Double, which constituted the club's first trophies, being used in 28 league matches by coach Ioan Andone. He also played the full 90 minutes in the 2–1 victory against Unirea Urziceni in the Cupa României final. Subsequently, Galiassi played five games for The Railway Men in the 2008–09 Champions League group stage. Among these matches were a historical 2–1 victory at Stadio Olimpico against AS Roma and a 0–0 draw against Chelsea, a game in which his performance in front of his direct opponent Didier Drogba was highly regarded. In the same season he won another Cupa României with the club, but this time Galiassi was only an unused substitute in the final. After his impressive performance in the Champions League, clubs from Russia and Greece were interested in acquiring him and Swiss side Young Boys offered €100,000 for his loan. However, in July 2009 he was transferred by CFR for a sum of €500,000 to newly promoted Süper Lig side Kasımpaşa.

On 9 August 2009, Galiassi made his Süper Lig debut under coach Besim Durmuş in a 2–1 away loss to Bursaspor. After only three league matches in half a year, Kasımpaşa loaned him back to Romania at Unirea Alba Iulia for a fee of €30,000, because coach Adrian Falub wanted him there. Galiassi ended his career at Concordia Chiajna where he made his last Liga I appearance on 22 October 2011 in a 1–0 away loss to Voința Sibiu, having a total of 85 games with four goals scored in the competition.

== Honours ==
Bolívar

- Bolivian Primera División: 2005–06 Clausura

CFR Cluj

- Liga I: 2007–08
- Cupa României: 2007–08, 2008–09
