= Erhan Altın =

Turkish footballer and manager

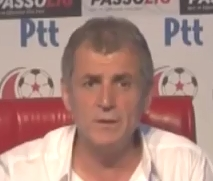

Personal information
- Date of birth: 28 August 1956 (age 70)
- Place of birth: Samsun, Turkey
- Position: Defender

Team information
- Current team: Kocaelispor (manager)

Youth career
- –: Taçspor

Senior career*
Years	Team	Apps	(Gls)
–1977	Taçspor		
1977–1979	Fenerbahçe	5	(0)
1979–1982	Göztepe	45	(2)
1982–1990	Kocaelispor	163	(1)

International career
1981	Turkey	1	(0)

Managerial career
- 1996: Eskişehirspor (assistant)
- 1996–1997: Çanspor
- 1999–2001: Kocaelispor (assistant)
- 2003: Diyarbakırspor (assistant)
- 2003–2004: Elazığspor (assistant)
- 2005: Akçaabat Sebatspor (assistant)
- 2005–2007: Çaykur Rizespor (assistant)
- 2007–2008: Denizlispor (assistant)
- 2008–2009: Bursaspor (assistant)
- 2009: Kocaelispor
- 2009: Denizlispor
- 2011–2012: Giresunspor
- 2012: Samsunspor
- 2013: Göztepe
- 2014–2015: Samsunspor
- 2015–2016: Alanyaspor
- 2016: Şanlıurfaspor
- 2019: Elazığspor
- 2020–2021: Kocaelispor
- 2022: Vanspor
- 2022–2023: Fethiyespor
- 2023: Çankaya
- * Club domestic league appearances and goals

Erhan Altın (born 28 August 1956) is a Turkish football manager and former player. He last coached Çankaya.

== Career ==
Altin had managed Çanspor (1996–1997) and Kocaelispor (2009). Before retiring in 1990, he also played professionally as a midfielder for several clubs, including Taçspor (1966–1976), Fenerbahçe (1976–1979), Göztepe (1979–1982) and Kocaelispor (1982–1990). In addition, he earned one cap for the Turkey national football team in 1981 in a match against the USSR.

Altin was a coach (manager assistant) in Eskişehirspor, Kocaelispor (1999–2001), Diyarbakırspor (2003), Elazığspor (2003–2004), Akçaabat Sebatspor (2005), Çaykur Rizespor (2005–2007), Denizlispor (2007–2008) and Bursaspor (2008–2009).
