= Sertan Vardar =

Turkish professional footballer (born 1982)

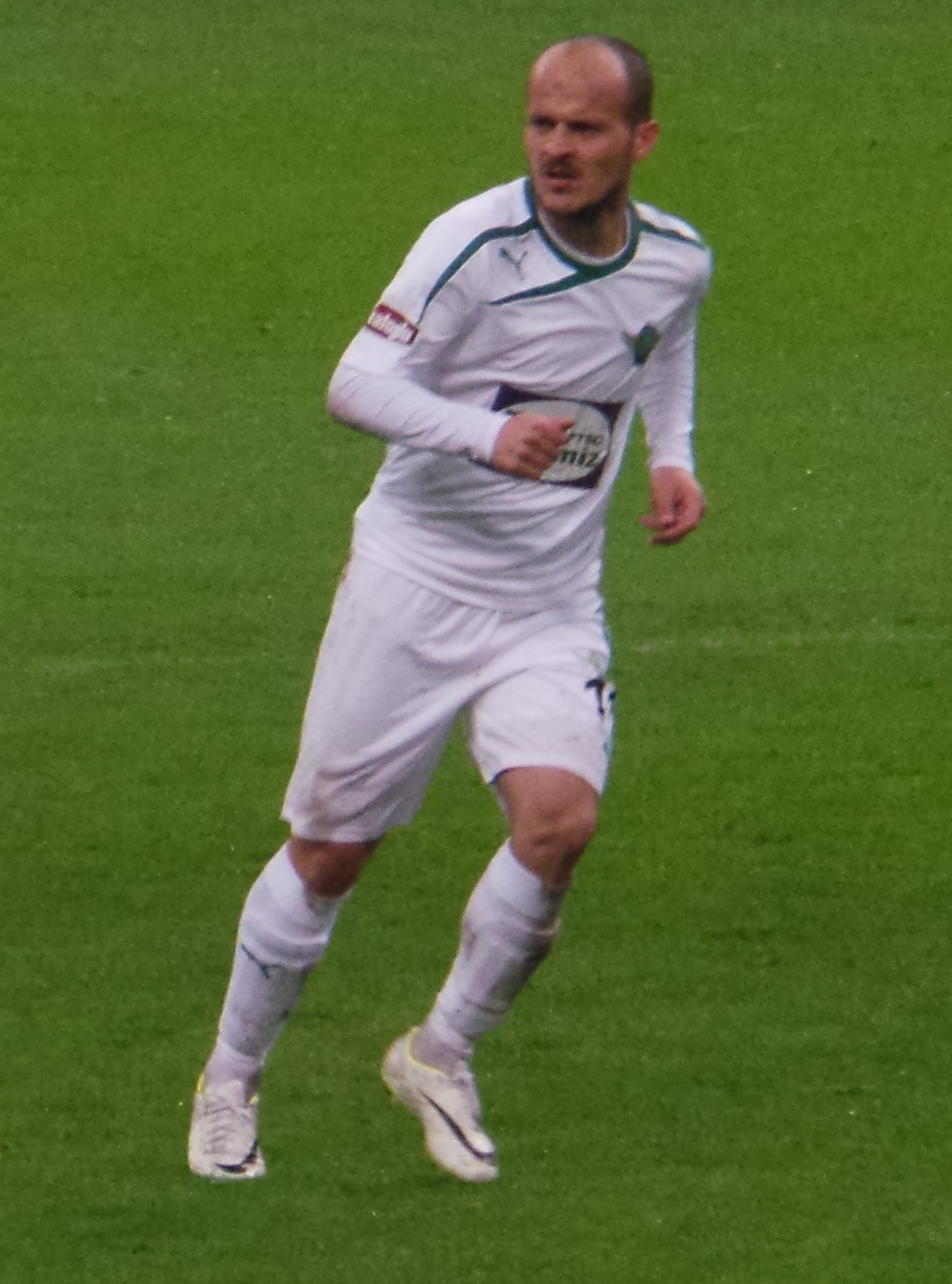

Personal information
- Date of birth: 13 March 1982 (age 44)
- Place of birth: İzmir, Turkey
- Height: 1.73 m (5 ft 8 in)
- Position: Winger

Youth career
- Bucaspor

Senior career*
Years	Team	Apps	(Gls)
2000–2005	Bucaspor	137	(11)
2005–2006	Altay	43	(5)
2006–2007	Mardinspor	25	(1)
2007–2009	Boluspor	52	(5)
2009–2010	Karabükspor	32	(4)
2010–2011	Kayseri Erciyesspor	16	(2)
2011	Çaykur Rizespor	12	(0)
2011–2014	Akhisar Belediyespor	91	(14)
2014–2015	Gaziantep BB	15	(3)
2015	Akhisar Belediyespor	6	(0)
2015–2016	MKE Ankaragücü	29	(6)
2016	Bucaspor	4	(0)
- * Club domestic league appearances and goals

Sertan Vardar (born 13 March 1982) is a Turkish former professional footballer who played as a midfielder.

== Career ==
Vardar was a member of the Kardemir Karabükspor side that won the 2009–10 TFF First League.

On 31 August 2016, he joined Bucaspor on a one-year contract.

== Honours ==
Kardemir Karabükspor

- TFF First League: 2009–10
