= Tarek Amer =

Egyptian footballer (born 1989)

Tarek Emir Tekin
Personal information
- Full name: Tarek Amer El-Desoky Mustafa Arafa
- Date of birth: 21 July 1989 (age 37)
- Place of birth: Alexandria, Egypt
- Height: 1.77 m (5 ft 10 in)
- Position: Left-back

Senior career*
Years	Team	Apps	(Gls)
2007–2009	Haras El-Hodood		
2010	Gloria Buzău	1	(0)
2010	Akhisarspor	0	(0)
2010–2011	CF Brăila	10	(1)
2011–2012	El-Entag El-Harby		
2012–2013	CS Ştefăneşti		
2013–2014	Farul Constanţa	2	(0)
2014–2014	Sulaimanya Shport Club		
2016–2017	FB Gulbene		
Total		13	(1)
- * Club domestic league appearances and goals as of 27 March 2021

Tarek Amer (born 21 July 1989) is an Egyptian former footballer who played as a left-back.

== Career ==
Amer played for the Romanian teams Gloria Buzău in Liga I and for CF Brăila and Farul Constanţa in Liga II.
