= Bahri Kaya =

Turkish footballer

Personal information
- Full name: Bahri Kaya
- Date of birth: 10 June 1957 (age 69)
- Place of birth: Trabzon, Turkey
- Height: 1.75 m (5 ft 9 in)
- Position: Forward

Senior career*
Years	Team	Apps	(Gls)
1977–1980	Fenerbahçe		
1980–1982	Sakaryaspor		
1983–1984	İskenderunspor 1967		
1985–1986	Vefa		

Managerial career
- 1992–1993: Küçükköyspor
- 1995–1996: Zeytinburnuspor (assistant)
- 1996: Zeytinburnuspor
- 1997–1998: Giresunspor
- 1998–1999: Gaziosmanpaşaspor
- 1999–2000: Ağrıspor
- 2000–2001: Diyarbakırspor
- 2001: Yozgatspor
- 2002–2003: Adanaspor
- 2004–2005: Kocaelispor
- 2005–2006: Etimesgut Şekerspor
- 2006–2007: Diyarbakırspor
- 2007–2010: Orduspor
- 2010: Gebzespor
- 2010–2012: Giresunspor
- 2012: Boluspor
- 2012–2013: Şanlıurfaspor
- 2014–2015: Sarıyer
- 2017–2018: Sarıyer
- 2018–2019: Utaş Uşakspor
- 2019–2020: Çorum
- * Club domestic league appearances and goals

Bahri Kaya (born 10 June 1957) is a Turkish former football player and manager who played as a forward.
