= Yüksel Yeşilova =

Turkish football coach (born 1968)

Personal information
- Date of birth: 24 January 1972 (age 54)
- Place of birth: Adana, Turkey

Managerial career
- Years: Team
- 2005: PSI Yurdumspor Köln
- 2006: Politehnica Timișoara (assistant)
- 2006: SV Yeşilyurt
- 2007: Sportul Studențesc
- 2007: Kahramanmaraşspor (assistant)
- 2008: Universitatea Cluj (assistant)
- 2008–2009: Steaua București (assistant)
- 2009: Giresunspor
- 2009–2010: Ceahlăul Piatra Neamț (assistant)
- 2010: Mersin İdmanyurdu SK
- 2011: Tarsus İdman Yurdu
- 2012: Petrolul Ploiești (assistant)
- 2012: Astra Ploiești (assistant)
- 2012: Dinamo București (assistant)
- 2013: Mordovia Saransk (conditioning coach)
- 2013: Kuban Krasnodar (conditioning coach)
- 2014: Mordovia Saransk (assistant)
- 2014: Petrolul Ploiești (assistant)
- 2015–2016: Voluntari (assistant)
- 2016: Voluntari (assistant)
- 2016: Bregalnica Štip
- 2017: Tepecikspor
- 2018: Astra Giurgiu (fitness coach)
- 2019: Petrolul Ploiești (fitness coach)
- 2019–2020: Rapid București (assistant)
- 2021: Gloria Buzău (fitness coach)

Yüksel Yeşilova (born 30 October 1968 in Adana, Turkey) is a retired Turkish football player and current coach.
