= Osman Özdemir =

Turkish footballer

Personal information
- Date of birth: 1 September 1961 (age 65)
- Place of birth: Sakarya, Turkey

Senior career*
Years	Team	Apps	(Gls)
1983–1987	Gençlerbirliği		
1987–1991	Adanaspor		
1991–1992	Sakaryaspor		
1992–1994	Yeni Yozgatspor		
1994–1995	Konyaspor		

Managerial career
- 1996–1998: Sakaryaspor (youth)
- 1998–2000: Gençlerbirliği (assistant)
- 2000–2002: Çaykur Rizespor (assistant)
- 2002: Kırıkkalespor
- 2004–2005: Gençlerbirliği (assistant)
- 2005: Diyarbakırspor (assistant)
- 2006–2007: Çankırı Belediyespor
- 2007–2008: Oftasspor
- 2009: Orduspor
- 2010–2011: Adanaspor
- 2011–2012: Konyaspor
- 2012: Adana Demirspor
- 2013: Kartalspor
- 2015: Sakaryaspor
- 2016: Hacettepe
- 2016: İnegölspor
- 2017: Sakaryaspor
- 2017–2018: Diyarbakırspor
- 2018–2019: 24 Erzincanspor
- 2020: İnegölspor
- * Club domestic league appearances and goals

Osman Özdemir (born 1 September 1961) is a Turkish football manager and former player

== Coaching career ==
In 2009 Özdemir obtained a UEFA Pro License.
