= Hüseyin Kalpar =

Turkish football coach and former player (born 1955)

Personal information
- Date of birth: 25 February 1955 (age 71)
- Place of birth: Gaziantep, Turkey
- Position: Midfielder

Senior career*
Years	Team	Apps	(Gls)
1979–1983	Gaziantepspor		

Managerial career
- 1994–1997: Gaziantepspor (Coach)
- 1997–1998: Altay (Coach)
- 1998–1999: Gaziantepspor
- 1999–2001: Yozgatspor
- 2001: Antalyaspor
- 2001–2003: Diyarbakırspor
- 2003: Altay
- 2003–2004: Kocaelispor
- 2004–2005: Bursaspor
- 2005: Diyarbakırspor
- 2005–2006: Gaziantepspor
- 2006–2008: Sarıyer
- 2008: Adanaspor
- 2008–2009: Sakaryaspor
- 2009–2011: Samsunspor
- 2011–2012: Çaykur Rizespor
- 2012: Göztepe
- 2013–2014: Samsunspor
- 2014–2015: Alanyaspor
- 2015: Karabükspor
- 2015–2017: Alanyaspor
- 2017: Gaziantep BB
- 2017–2018: Elazığspor
- 2018–2019: Giresunspor
- 2020: Pendikspor
- 2021: Tarsus İ.Y.
- * Club domestic league appearances and goals

Hüseyin Kalpar (born 25 February 1955) is a Turkish football coach and former player who last coached Tarsus İdman Yurdu.

== Coaching career ==
He started his coaching career as an assistant coach of Gaziantepspor in the 1994-95 season. After three seasons at Gaziantepspor, he joined Altay as an assistant coach. One season later, he returned his former team Gaziantepspor as a manager. After working there for one and a half seasons, he left Gaziantepspor and managed many other Süper Lig and 1. Lig clubs in the following years. On 31 May 2011, he was named as the manager for Çaykur Rizespor. He became the manager of Pendikspor in 2020.
