= Paul Aidoo =

Ghanaian footballer (born 1991)

Paul
Personal information
- Full name: Paul Aidoo
- Place of birth: Sekondi
- Position: Midfielder

Senior career*
| Years | Team | Apps | (Gls) |
| 2010–2011 | Berekum Arsenal | ? | (?) |
| 2011–2012 | İstanbul Güngörenspor | 29 | (1) |
| 2012–2015 | Berekum Chelsea F.C. | 18 | (0) |
- * Club domestic league appearances and goals

Paul Aidoo (born 30 November 1991) is a Ghanaian former footballer. He attended Fijai Secondary School in Sekondi Takoradi from 2002 to 2005
