= Gideon Sani =

Nigerian footballer

Gideon Adinoy Sani
Personal information
- Full name: Gideon Adinoy Sani
- Date of birth: 8 June 1990 (age 36)
- Place of birth: Lagos, Nigeria
- Position: Forward

Team information
- Current team: Muğlaspor
- Number: 80

Senior career*
Years	Team	Apps	(Gls)
2011	İzmirspor	3	(3)
2011–2014	Akhisar Belediyespor	21	(3)
2013	→ Tavşanlı Linyitspor (loan)	15	(2)
2014–2015	Yeni Amasyaspor	15	(8)
2015–	Muğlaspor	23	(5)
- * Club domestic league appearances and goals as of 30 April 2016

Gideon Adinoy Sani (born 8 June 1990 in Lagos, Nigeria) is a Nigerian football player who plays for Akhisar Belediyespor.

== Career ==
Sani moved from the Nigerian Magate FC football academy to Turkey. He joined Turkish amateur club Izmirspor where he played 3 matches and scored 3 goals. In 2011, he signed a professional contract with Akhisar Belediyespor, professional Turkish football club and was assigned the jersey number 8.
