= Ibrahim Sulemana (footballer, born 1987) =

Ghanaian footballer

Ibrahim Suleiman
Personal information
- Full name: Ibrahim Sulemana
- Date of birth: March 3, 1987 (age 39)
- Place of birth: Accra, Ghana
- Height: 1.93 m (6 ft 4 in)
- Position: Forward

Youth career
- 2000–2005: Top Ten Academy FC

Senior career*
Years	Team	Apps	(Gls)
2005–2009	Heart of Lions	22	(11)
2010–2011	Orduspor	14	(10)
2011	TKİ Tavşanlı Linyitspor	11	(5)

International career
2008	Ghana U20	7	(2)
- * Club domestic league appearances and goals

Ibrahim Sulemana (born 3 March 1987 in Accra) is a Ghanaian football striker.

== Career ==
Sulemana began his youth career with Top Ten Academy Football club and then to Heart of Lions. He left on 4 January 2010 the Ghana Premier League club Heart of Lions and signed for 2/5 year with Turkish Bank Asya 1. Lig side Orduspor. Sulemana made his debut for Orduspor on 17 January 2010 against MKE Ankaragücü in the Turkish Cup.
