= Engin Korukır =

Turkish footballer

Personal information
- Date of birth: 19 January 1958 (age 68)
- Place of birth: Gölcük, Kocaeli, Turkey

Managerial career
- Years: Team
- 1996–1997: Bekirpaşaspor
- 1998–1999: Erzurumspor (assistant)
- 1999: Çaykur Rizespor (assistant)
- 2000: Kocaelispor (youth)
- 2000–2002: Kocaelispor (assistant)
- 2003–2004: Çaykur Rizespor (assistant)
- 2004: Kocaelispor
- 2005: Sarıyer
- 2005–2006: Mersin İdman Yurdu
- 2006–2007: Antalyaspor (assistant)
- 2007–2008: Ankaraspor (assistant)
- 2008: Antalyaspor (assistant)
- 2009: Giresunspor
- 2009–2010: Sakaryaspor
- 2010: Diyarbakırspor
- 2011: Kartalspor
- 2012: Bozüyükspor
- 2012: Çaykur Rizespor
- 2014: Boluspor
- 2014: Antalyaspor
- 2015: Şanlıurfaspor
- 2016: Samsunspor
- 2017–2018: Sakaryaspor
- 2019: Kocaelispor
- 2020–2021: Serik Belediyespor
- 2021: Serik Belediyespor

Engin Korukır (born 19 January 1958) is a Turkish football manager.
