= Ercan Albay =

Turkish footballer

Personal information
- Date of birth: 4 December 1954 (age 71)
- Place of birth: Samsun, Turkey
- Position: Midfielder

Senior career*
| Years | Team | Apps | (Gls) |
| 1974–1978 | Samsunspor | | |
| 1978–1980 | Adana Demirspor | | |
| 1980–1982 | Adanaspor | | |
| 1982–1984 | Samsunspor | | |
| 1983–1984 | → Giresunspor (loan) | | |

International career
| 1977 | Turkey U21 | 1 | (0) |

Managerial career
- 2008–2009: Mersin İdman Yurdu
- 2012: Adana Demirspor
- 2013: Adanaspor
- 2014: Adana Demirspor
- 2019: Kiremithanespor
- * Club domestic league appearances and goals

Ercan Albay (born 4 December 1954) is a retired Turkish football midfielder and later manager.
