= Manisaspor =

Association football club in Turkey

- Nickname(s): Tarzanlar (Tarzans), Maniaspor
- Founded: 15 June 1965; 60 years ago
- Ground: Mümin Özkasap Stadium; Manisa, Turkey
- Capacity: 3,000
- Chairman: Gencay Esendağ
- Manager: Erkan Aslan
- Website: http://www.manisaspor.org.tr
| Home colours | Away colours | Third colours |

Manisaspor is a Turkish professional football club located in the city of Manisa. Originally formed in 1931 as Sakaryaspor, the club changed its name to Manisaspor on 15 June 1965. The club colours are red, white, and black. Manisaspor play their home matches at Mümin Özkasap Stadium. Tarık Almış Sports Complex is the training ground of the club from the Aegean Region.

== History ==
Manisaspor Kulübü was founded in 1931 as Sakaryaspor, although the club was not located in the Sakarya Province. The original club colours were black and white. Sakaryaspor won the Manisa Amateur League 15 times, and finished 3rd in the Turkish Amateur League in 1954.

The club ceased operations during World War II but continued competing in 1946. In 1964, Manisaspor were allowed to compete professionally in the 1.Lig as Manisa Sakaryaspor. In their first season, the club finished with 16 points, earning them relegation. However, on 15 June 1965 at 21:00, Sakaryaspor officially became Manisaspor, and the club was allowed to compete in the 1. Lig again.

Manisaspor spent the first forty years of their existence in the lower leagues of the Turkish football league system. In 2000, they received a financial boost from Zorlu Holding, who injected the club with money. In turn, Manisaspor were re-branded as Vestel Manisaspor. Their first promotion to the Süper Lig came in 2005 under the guidance of manager Levent Eriş.

Ersun Yanal was named new manager for the 2005–06 season. At the end of the winter break in the 2006–07 season, Manisaspor were flying high in fourth position. However, they could not keep up the results, finishing in 12th place, four points away from relegation.

Manisaspor finally relegated from the First League after finishing as 16th in the 2014–15 season and returned to the third level after 13 years. As of the 2025–2026 season they are competing in the Turkish Regional Amateur League.

== Colours and badge ==
Manisa SK's classic home kit

Manisaspor originally wore black and white kits. The club changed their badge, removing the Vestel moniker and replacing it with the club's foundation year (1965).

== Former sponsors ==
- Vestel (2000–2007)

== League participations ==
- Süper Lig: 2005–2008, 2009–2012
- TFF First League: 1964–1978, 1980–1983, 1991–1993, 1994–1995, 2002–2005, 2008–2009, 2012–2015, 2016–2018
- TFF Second League: 1978–1980, 1984–1991, 1993–1994, 1995–2002, 2015–2016, 2018–2019
- TFF Third League: 2019–2021
- Turkish Regional Amateur League: 2021–2022, 2025–
- Amateur Level: 1931–1964, 1983–1984, 2022–2025

== Manisali Tarzan ==
The club has a loyal following in the city. Their ultras are known as ‘Tarzanlar’, named after a local hero known as ‘Manisa Tarzanı’ (Tarzan of Manisa). He was a veteran of World War I decorated with military honors who gave up his privileges, giving all his money to the poor, to commit his life to the reforestation of Manisa after most of the city's trees and green areas were burned down during the Greco-Turkish War (1919–1922).

== Notable former players ==
- (Turkey) Koray Avcı
- (Turkey) Hakan Balta
- (Turkey) Nizamettin Çalışkan
- (Turkey) Caner Erkin
- (Turkey) Selçuk İnan
- (Turkey) Yiğit İncedemir
- (Turkey) Uğur İnceman
- (Turkey) Aygün Taşkıran
- (Turkey) Hüseyin Tok
- (Turkey) Arda Turan
- (Turkey) Burak Yılmaz
- (Slovakia) Filip Holosko
- (Brazil) Kahê
- (Brazil) Rafael Marques
- (Serbia) Slavko Perović
- (Nigeria) Isaac Promise
- (Canada) Josh Simpson

== Managers ==
- (Turkey) Reha Kapsal (2001)
- (Turkey) Mustafa Denizli (2003–04)
- (Turkey) Ersun Yanal (Oct 2005 – May 7)
- (Turkey) Giray Bulak (March 2007 – Jan 08)
- (Turkey) Yilmaz Vural (Jan 2008 – March 8)
- (Turkey) Levent Eriş (March 2008 – June 9)
- (Turkey) Mesut Bakkal (2009–10)
- (Turkey) Reha Kapsal (2010)
- (Turkey) Hakan Kutlu (July 2010 – Sept 10)
- (Turkey) Hikmet Karaman (Sept 2010 – June 11)
- (Turkey) Kemal Özdeş (Aug 2011 – Jan 12)
- (Turkey) Ümit Özat (2012)
- (Turkey) Taner Taşkın (2014–16; 2018)
