= Reha Kapsal =

Turkish football manager (born 1963)

Personal information
- Full name: Reha Kapsal
- Date of birth: 11 April 1963 (age 63)
- Place of birth: Diyarbakır, Turkey
- Position: Striker

Senior career*
Years	Team	Apps	(Gls)
1982–1989	Altay		
1989–1990	Trabzonspor		
1990–1993	Altay		
1994–1997	Zeytinburnuspor		
1997–1998	Yeni Malatyaspor		

Managerial career
- 2000–2001: Altay (talent manager)
- 2000–2001: Altay (caretaker)
- 2000–2001: Marmaris Bld.
- 2001: Manisaspor
- 2001–2002: Altay (assistant)
- 2001–2002: Kayseri Erciyesspor (assistant)
- 2003–2004: Ankaraspor
- 2004: Ankaragücü
- 2008–2009: Karşıyaka
- 2010: Manisaspor
- 2011: Karşıyaka
- 2013: Şanlıurfaspor
- * Club domestic league appearances and goals

Reha Kapsal (born 11 April 1963 in Diyarbakır) is a Turkish football manager. He is a widely known head coach and manager in Turkish Süper Lig and 1. Lig for his training sessions and tactical point of view. He was also a footballer, and played as a striker.

Kapsal played for Diyarbakırspor, Altay, Trabzonspor (1989–1990), Zeytinburnuspor (1994–1997) and Malatya Belediyespor (1997–1998).

He managed Marmaris Belediyespor, Vestel Manisaspor, Kayserispor, Ankaraspor, Ankaragücü, Karşıyaka, Şanlıurfaspor and the Turkish U-21 National team.
