= Turgut Uçar =

Turkish footballer, manager, and coach (1964–2019)

Personal information
- Date of birth: 10 March 1964
- Place of birth: İzmir, Turkey
- Date of death: 4 February 2019 (aged 54)
- Place of death: İzmir, Turkey
- Position: Defender

Senior career*
Years	Team	Apps	(Gls)
1982–1988	Altay		
1988–1993	Trabzonspor		
1993–1994	Gaziantepspor		
1994–1996	Karşıyaka		
1996–1998	Balıkesirspor		
1998–1999	Soma Linyitspor		

Managerial career
- 2001: Altay
- 2001–2002: Adanaspor
- 2003–2004: Akhisarspor
- 2004–2005: Altay
- 2005–2006: Uşakspor
- 2006–2007: Karşıyaka
- 2008: Karabükspor
- 2010: İskenderun DÇ
- 2010: Tokatspor
- 2011: Karşıyaka
- 2011–2012: Bandırmaspor
- 2012–2013: Altay
- 2016–2017: Karşıyaka
- * Club domestic league appearances and goals

Turgut Uçar (10 March 1964 İzmir– 4 February 2019 İzmir) was a Turkish football manager and coach. He was a footballer as midfielder.

He began football career at Altay S.K. and became professional in 1982–83 season. He transferred to Trabzonspor in 1988–89 season and played for 5 years. He also played for Gaziantepspor (1993–1994), Karşıyaka (1994–1996), Balıkesirspor (1996–1998) and Soma Linyitspor (1998–99). He retired in 1999.

He managed Altay S.K. (2001, 2004–2005 and 2012–13), Adanaspor (2001–2002), Akhisarspor (2003-2004), Uşakspor (2005–2006) and Yimpaş Yozgatspor 2006, Karşıyaka (2006–2007, 2011 and 2016–17), Karabükspor (2008), İskenderun DÇ (2010), Tokatspor (2010) and Bandırmaspor (2012–13). He died from cerebral embolism on 4 February 2019 in İzmir after hospitalized nearly 3 months
