= Daniel Braga =

Brazilian footballer (born 1985)

Personal information
- Full name: Douglas Daniel Braga
- Date of birth: July 6, 1985 (age 41)
- Place of birth: Peruíbe, Brazil]
- Height: 1.75 m (5 ft 9 in)
- Position: Midfielder

Senior career*
Years	Team	Apps	(Gls)
?–2008	Rio Claro		
2008–2011	Denizlispor	60	(2)
- * Club domestic league appearances and goals

Douglas Daniel Braga (born July 6, 1985) is a Brazilian former professional footballer who played as a midfielder.

== Career ==
Daniel Braga played for Süper Lig side Denizlispor.
