= Hüsnü Özkara =

Turkish footballer

Personal information
- Date of birth: 25 January 1955 (age 71)
- Place of birth: Trabzon, Turkey
- Position: Defender

Senior career*
Years	Team	Apps	(Gls)
1974–1982	Trabzonspor		
1982–1990	Ankaragücü		
1988–1989	→ Kahramanmaraşspor (loan)		

International career
- Turkey U21
1980–1982	Turkey	8	(0)

Managerial career
- 1990–1991: Petkimspor
- 1991–1994: Tarımspor
- 1994–1995: Düzcespor
- 1995–1996: Erzurumspor
- 1997: Egospor
- 1997: Zonguldakspor
- 1997–1998: Boluspor
- 1998–1999: Erzincanspor
- 1999–2000: Trabzonspor (assistant)
- 2000–2001: Hatayspor
- 2001: Kayseri Erciyesspor
- 2001: Sarıyer
- 2001–2002: Kayseri Erciyesspor
- 2002–2003: Konyaspor
- 2004: Kayserispor
- 2005–2006: Büyüksehir Belediyespor
- 2006: Trabzonspor (assistant)
- 2007–2008: Sakaryaspor
- 2008: Adanaspor
- 2008–2009: Karabükspor
- 2009–2010: Konyaspor
- 2010–2011: Giresunspor
- 2011: Boluspor
- 2011–2012: Elazığspor
- 2012: Konyaspor
- 2013: Aydınspor
- 2014: Orduspor
- 2016–2017: 1461 Trabzon
- 2017: Fethiyespor
- * Club domestic league appearances and goals

Hüsnü Özkara (born 25 January 1955) is a retired Turkish football defender and later manager.
