= Erol Azgın =

Turkish footballer (born 1963)

Personal information
- Date of birth: 13 March 1963 (age 63)
- Place of birth: Gaziantep, Turkey

Team information
- Current team: Nizipspor (manager)

Senior career*
Years	Team	Apps	(Gls)
1982–1988	Gaziantepspor		
1988–1990	Çaykur Rizespor		
1990–1991	Adana Demirspor		
1991–1992	Siirtspor		
1992	Yozgatspor		
1992–1994	Adıyamanspor		
1994	Batman Belediyespor		
1994–1995	Gaziantep BB		

Managerial career
- 1995–1998: Gaziantep BB (assistant)
- 1998–1999: Tarsus Idman Yurdu (assistant)
- 2000–2001: Gaskispor
- 2001–2004: Gaziantep BB (assistant)
- 2004: Gaziantepspor (assistant)
- 2005–2006: Gaziantepspor (youth)
- 2006–2008: Konyaspor (assistant)
- 2008: Aksarayspor
- 2008–2009: Tarsus Idman Yurdu
- 2009–2010: Göztepe
- 2010–2011: Gaziantep BB
- 2012–2013: Kahramanmaraş BB
- 2014: Erzincanspor
- 2016: Tarsus Idman Yurdu
- 2016: Nevşehir Belediyespor
- 2017–2018: Araban Belediyespor
- 2019–: Nizipspor
- * Club domestic league appearances and goals

Erol Azgın (born 13 March 1963) is a Turkish former football player and manager who played as a midfielder.
