= Levent Eriş =

Turkish footballer

Personal information
- Date of birth: 17 September 1962 (age 64)
- Place of birth: İzmir, Turkey
- Position: Midfielder

Team information
- Current team: Kastamonuspor 1966

Senior career*
Years	Team	Apps	(Gls)
1981–1984	İzmirspor		
1984–1989	Samsunspor		
1989–1991	İzmirspor		
1991–1992	Alanyaspor		
1992–1993	İzmirspor		
1993–1994	Yeni Sincanspor		
1994–1995	Bucaspor		
1995	→ Karşıyaka (loan)		
1995–1996	Kuşadasıspor		
1996–1997	İzmirspor		

International career
- Turkey U21

Managerial career
- 1998–1999: İzmirspor (assistant)
- 1999–2009: İzmirspor
- 2001–2003: Manisaspor
- 2003–2004: Kayseri Erciyesspor
- 2004: Mersin İdman Yurdu
- 2004–2005: Manisaspor
- 2005–2006: Altay
- 2006: Diyarbakırspor
- 2006–2007: Samsunspor
- 2007–2008: Adana Demirspor
- 2008–2009: Manisaspor
- 2009–2010: Giresunspor
- 2010–2011: Boluspor
- 2011–Jul 2013: Adanaspor
- Oct 2013–2015: Adanaspor
- 2015: Bucaspor
- 2015–2016: Manisa
- 2017: Mersin İdman Yurdu
- 2017: Gümüşhanespor
- 2017–2018: Fethiyespor
- 2019: Bucaspor
- 2019: Adanaspor
- 2019–2020: Elazığspor
- 2020–: Kastamonuspor 1966
- * Club domestic league appearances and goals

Levent Eriş (born 17 September 1962) is a UEFA Pro Licensed Turkish football manager and former player.
