= Eyüp Arın =

Turkish footballer

Personal information
- Full name: Eyüp Arın
- Date of birth: 19 June 1962 (age 64)
- Place of birth: Adana, Turkey
- Height: 1.76 m (5 ft 9 in)
- Position: Defender

Senior career*
Years	Team	Apps	(Gls)
1983–1985	Mardinspor	27	(0)
1985–1987	Adanaspor	54	(0)
1990–1992	Tarsus İdman Yurdu	36	(0)
1992–1993	Batman Belediyespor	7	(0)
1993–1994	Niğdespor	10	(0)

Managerial career
- 1996–2004: Adanaspor youth
- 2004: Adanaspor
- 2004–2005: Adanaspor youth
- 2005: Adanaspor
- 2005–2008: Adanaspor youth
- 2008: Adanaspor
- 2008–2011: Adanaspor youth
- 2011: Adanaspor
- 2011–2015: Adanaspor youth
- 2015: Adanaspor
- 2015–2016: Adanaspor youth
- 2016: Adanaspor
- 2016–2017: Adanaspor youth
- 2017–2019: Adanaspor
- 2020: Adanaspor
- 2022–: Adanaspor
- * Club domestic league appearances and goals as of 11 November 2022 ‡ National team caps and goals as of 12 June 2017

Eyüp Arın (born 19 June 1962) is a Turkish former footballer who currently manages Adanaspor.

== Professional career ==
Arın is a longtime director of Adanaspor, and has taken the role of interim manager whenever the club experiences troubles in the Turkish leagues.
