= Kenan Atik =

Turkish footballer

Personal information
- Full name: Kenan Atik
- Date of birth: 20 May 1965 (age 61)
- Place of birth: Denizli, Turkey
- Position: Midfielder

Team information
- Current team: Denizlispor (technical director)

Senior career*
Years	Team	Apps	(Gls)
1984–1994	Denizlispor	78	(5)
1994–1995	Sivasspor	3	(1)
1995–1996	Nazilli Belediyespor	13	(3)
1996–1997	Torbalispor	11	(0)
1997–1998	Gümüşlerspor	0	(0)

Managerial career
- 2008–2009: Yeşilköyspor
- 2010–2011: Denizlispor
- 2011: Denizlispor
- 2012–2013: Denizlispor
- 2014–2015: Denizlispor
- 2020: Denizlispor
- * Club domestic league appearances and goals as of 5 December 2020

Kenan Atik (born 20 May 1965) is a Turkish professional football manager and former player, who both played for and coached Denizlispor. He played as a midfielder during his playing career.

== Professional career ==
Arik spent his early career with Denizlispor in the amateur leagues in Turkey, and had stints with Sivasspor, Nazilli Belediyespor, Torbalispor and Gümüşlerspor thereafter.

== Managerial career ==
After retiring as a footballer, Atik returned to Denizlispor as a youth coach in 1999. He had a brief stint as the manager of the amateur side Yeşilköyspor. He returned to Denizlispor as an assistant manager, and had various stints as their interim manager. On 1 December 2020, he was named their interim manager once more in the Süper Lig as Robert Prosinečki was sacked.
