= Coşkun Demirbakan =

Turkish footballer

Personal information
- Date of birth: 10 November 1954 (age 71)
- Place of birth: Eskişehir, Turkey
- Height: 1.80 m (5 ft 11 in)
- Position: Defender

Youth career
- –1973: Fenerbahçe

Senior career*
Years	Team	Apps	(Gls)
1973	Fenerbahçe		
1973–1974	Malatyaspor		
1974–1977	Eskişehirspor		
1977–1980	Fenerbahçe		
1980–1984	Sakaryaspor		

International career
1978	Turkey	2	(0)

Managerial career
- 1991–1992: Akyazıspor
- 1992–1993: Sakaryaspor
- 1993–1996: Alanyaspor
- 1996: Malatyaspor (assistant)
- 1996–1997: Malatyaspor
- 1997–1999: Eskişehirspor
- 1999–2000: Diyarbakırspor
- 2000–2001: Sakaryaspor
- 2002–2003: Eskişehirspor
- 2003–2004: Antalyaspor
- 2006: Kahramanmaraşspor
- 2006: Fethiyespor
- 2008: Sakaryaspor
- 2008–2009: Diyarbakırspor
- 2009: Boluspor
- 2010: Kocaelispor
- 2010–2011: Altay
- 2011: Tavşanlı Linyitspor
- 2013: İstanbul Güngörenspor
- 2014–2015: Diyarbakır BB
- 2016: Elazığspor
- 2018–2019: Adanaspor
- 2019: Eskişehirspor
- 2020: Adanaspor
- * Club domestic league appearances and goals

Coşkun Demirbakan (born 10 November 1954) is a Turkish football manager and former player. He played as a defender.
