= Severin Bikoko =

Cameroonian striker

Personal information
- Full name: Severin Brice Bikoko
- Date of birth: 24 September 1988 (age 38)
- Place of birth: Yaoundé, Cameroon
- Height: 1.85 m (6 ft 1 in)
- Position: Forward

Senior career*
Years	Team	Apps	(Gls)
2006–2008	Newcastle Jets FC		
2008–2011	Kayseri Erciyesspor	77	(25)
2011–2012	Çaykur Rizespor	33	(19)
2012–2013	Akhisar Belediyespor	2	(0)
- * Club domestic league appearances and goals as of 23 March 2014

Severin Brice Bikoko (born 24 September 1988 in Yaoundé) is a Cameroonian striker.
