= Diego Lima (footballer, born 1988) =

Brazilian footballer

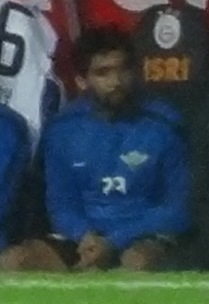

Personal information
- Full name: Diego da Costa Lima
- Date of birth: 30 September 1988 (age 38)
- Place of birth: Duque de Caxias, Brazil
- Height: 1.78 m (5 ft 10 in)
- Position: Midfielder

Senior career*
Years	Team	Apps	(Gls)
2007	Portuguesa-RJ		
2007	Audax Rio		
2007	Rio Branco-SP		
2007–2008	Kastoria	16	(3)
2009	Miguel Couto		
2010	Camaçari	18	(3)
2010–2013	Akhisar Belediyespor	37	(3)
2014	Atlético	12	(0)
2014–2016	Boavista	22	(0)
2016	Miami United		
2016	Zimbru Chișinău	8	(1)
2017	Songkhla United		
2018	Army United	16	(3)
2019	Ubon United	0	(0)
2019–2020	AC Kajaani	8	(2)
2020	Hetten	1	(0)
- * Club domestic league appearances and goals as of 23:56, 8 December 2019 (UTC)

Diego da Costa Lima (born 30 September 1988) is a Brazilian professional footballer who plays as a midfielder.
