= Mustafa Akçay =

Turkish footballer (born 1983)

Personal information
- Date of birth: 20 September 1983 (age 43)
- Place of birth: Trabzon, Turkey
- Position: Midfielder

Team information
- Current team: Türkspor Nürtingen

Youth career
- –1993: TSV Bernhausen
- 1993–2002: Stuttgarter Kickers

Senior career*
Years	Team	Apps	(Gls)
2002–2008	Stuttgarter Kickers II	53	(5)
2003–2008	Stuttgarter Kickers	121	(3)
2008–2009	Antalyaspor	15	(0)
2009–2011	Adanaspor		
2011	Tunaspor Echterdingen		
2012–2019	TSV Bernhausen	34	(8)
2019–	Türkspor Nürtingen		

International career
- Turkey U19
- * Club domestic league appearances and goals

Mustafa Akçay (born 20 September 1983) is a Turkish footballer who plays as a midfielder for Kreisliga club Türkspor Nürtingen.
