= Fredrick Ogechi Okwara =

Nigerian footballer

Fredrick Okwara
Personal information
- Full name: Fredrick Ogechi Okwara
- Date of birth: 19 March 1989 (age 37)
- Place of birth: Orlu, Nigeria
- Position: Midfielder

Senior career*
Years	Team	Apps	(Gls)
2011–2012	Adanaspor	7	(0)
- * Club domestic league appearances and goals as of 23 February 2012

Fredrick Ogechi Okwara (born 19 March 1989) is a Nigerian professional footballer who last played as a midfielder for Adanaspor in the TFF First League.
