= Boka (footballer) =

Brazilian footballer (born 1988)

Personal information
- Full name: Cleyton Coelho dos Santos
- Date of birth: May 12, 1988 (age 38)
- Place of birth: Brazil
- Height: 1.90 m (6 ft 3 in)
- Position: Forward

Senior career*
Years	Team	Apps	(Gls)
2016	Thespakusatsu Gunma	4	(0)
Total		4	(0)
- * Club domestic league appearances and goals

Cleyton Coelho dos Santos (born May 12, 1988), known as Boka, is a Brazilian football player.

== Career ==
Boka played J2 League club Thespakusatsu Gunma in 2016.
