= Besim Durmuş =

Turkish footballer

Personal information
- Date of birth: 1 September 1965 (age 61)
- Place of birth: Samsun, Turkey

Managerial career
- Years: Team
- 2002–2003: Kartalspor (assistant)
- 2003–2004: Eyüpspor (assistant)
- 2004–2005: Samsunspor (youth assistant)
- 2005–2006: Samsunspor (assistant)
- 2006: Ünyespor (assistant)
- 2009–2010: Kasımpaşa
- 2010–2011: Iskenderun Demir Celikspor
- 2011–2012: Kartalspor
- 2012–2013: Samsunspor
- 2013: Kahramanmaraşspor
- 2013–2014: Boluspor
- 2015–2016: Erzurum BB
- 2016: Çarşambaspor
- 2017–2018: Samsunspor (academy)
- 2018: Samsunspor
- 2018–2020: Sultanbeyli Belediyespor

Besim Durmuş (born 1 September 1965) is a Turkish football manager and former player.
