= Akeem Agbetu =

Nigerian footballer

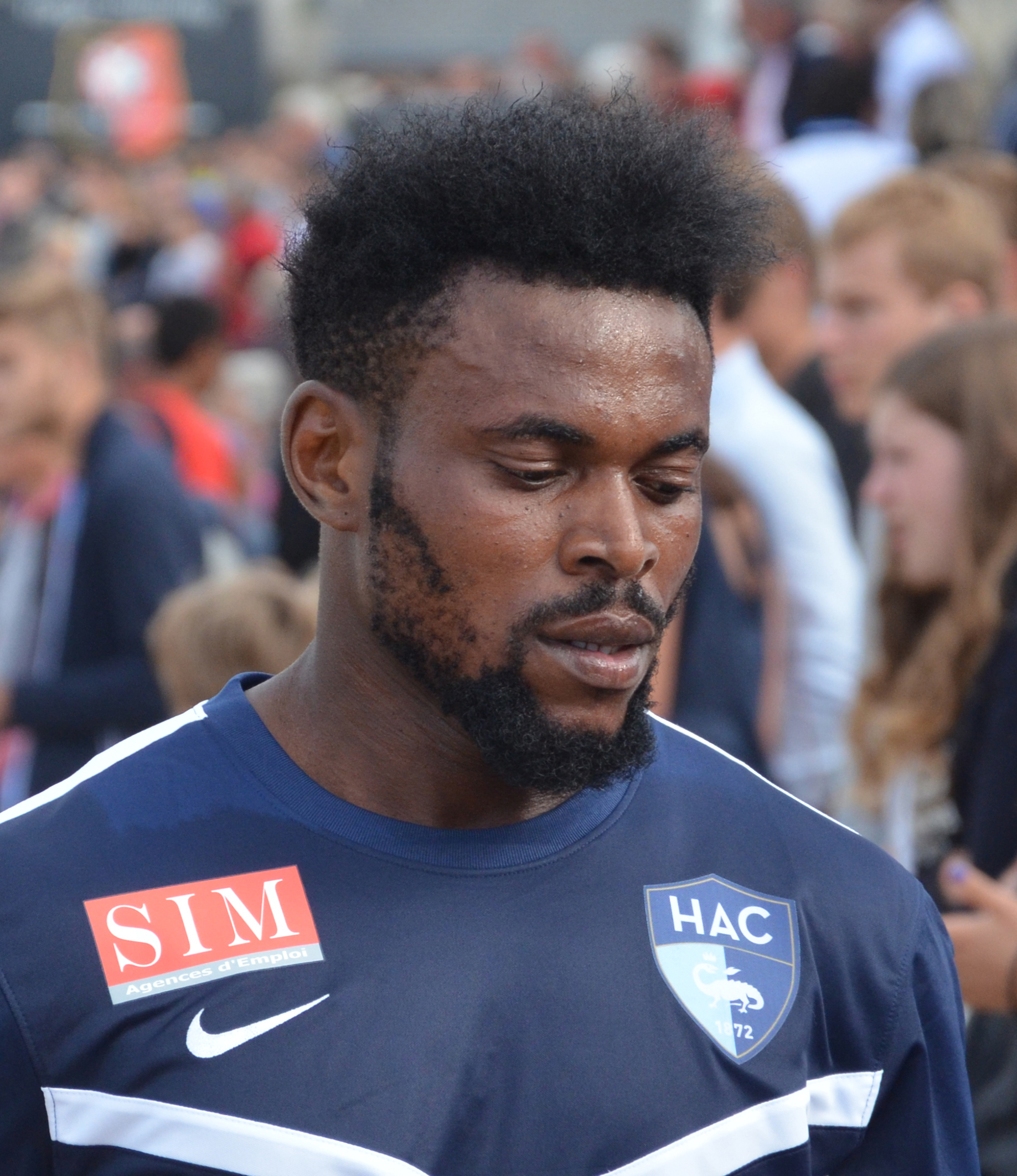
- Agbetu in 2015

Personal information
- Full name: Akeem Oriyomi Agbetu
- Date of birth: 10 March 1988 (age 38)
- Place of birth: Lagos, Nigeria
- Height: 1.70 m (5 ft 7 in)
- Position: Striker

Youth career
- –2004: FC Ebedei

Senior career*
Years	Team	Apps	(Gls)
2004–2005	FC Ebedei		
2005–2008	FC Midtjylland	3	(0)
2007–2008	→ Kolding FC (loan)	11	(3)
2009	Kolding FC	0	(0)
2009	→ Kocaelispor (loan)	17	(3)
2009–2010	Sivasspor	12	(0)
2010–2011	→ Samsunspor (loan)	31	(7)
2011–2012	Karşıyaka	33	(2)
2012–2013	Boluspor	9	(0)
2013–2014	TKİ Tavşanlı Linyitspor	44	(7)
2014–2016	Le Havre	6	(0)

International career
2007	Nigeria U20	2	(0)
- * Club domestic league appearances and goals as of 22:57, 20 February 2020 (UTC)

Akeem Oriyomi Agbetu(born 10 March 1988) is a Nigerian professional footballer, who plays as a striker.

== Career ==
For the 2014–2015 season Agbetu joined Le Havre AC of Ligue 2 agreeing a two-year contract.
