= Gaziantep F.K. =

Turkish football club

Gaziantep
- Full name: Gaziantep Futbol Kulübü A.Ş.
- Nickname: Şahinler (The Falcons)
- Short name: GFK
- Founded: 1988; 38 years ago (as Sankospor); 1999; 27 years ago (as Gaziantep Büyükşehir Belediyespor); 2017; 9 years ago (as Gazişehir Gaziantep Futbol Kulübü); 2019; 7 years ago (as Gaziantep Futbol Kulübü)
- Stadium: Gaziantep Stadium
- Capacity: 30,320
- Coordinates: 37°07′26″N 37°22′57″E
- President: Memik Yılmaz
- Head coach: Volkan Demirel
- League: Süper Lig
- 2025–26: Süper Lig, 12th of 18
- Website: www.gaziantepfk.org
Home colours	Away colours	Third colours

Gaziantep Futbol Kulübü is a Turkish professional football club based in Gaziantep. Founded in 1988, the club plays in the Süper Lig, the highest tier of Turkish football.

The club was founded as Sankospor in 1988 and competed at the amateur level until 1993. They competed between the TFF Third League and TFF First League until 2019, when they were promoted to the Süper Lig. During the 2020–21 season, the club reached the top of the standings in week 17, which they held for one week until being overtaken by Beşiktaş.

In February 2023, Gaziantep F.K. withdrew from the 2022–23 Süper Lig season following the devastating 2023 Turkey–Syria earthquakes, which severely impacted the city of Gaziantep and the club's facilities. The Turkish Football Federation (TFF) accepted the withdrawal request and approved the club's rights to remain in the Süper Lig for the following season, exempting them from relegation despite missing the remainder of the campaign.

The club returned to competition for the 2023–24 Süper Lig season, playing their home matches at the Kalyon Stadium. They finished the 2023–24 campaign in 11th place, securing their position in the top flight. In the subsequent 2024–25 season, the team continued to compete in the Süper Lig under the management of Selçuk İnan, who had been appointed head coach in March 2024.

== History ==
=== Foundation and early years (1988–2017) ===
The club was founded in 1988 as Sankospor under the sponsorship of Sanko Holding, an industrial group based in Gaziantep. Initially competing in amateur leagues, the team turned professional and entered the TFF Third League in 1993. They achieved promotion to the TFF First League (then known as the 2. Lig) after winning their group in the 1996–97 season.

In 1999, the club's name was changed to Gaziantep Büyükşehir Belediyespor as it came under the administration of the Gaziantep Metropolitan Municipality. The team spent several decades fluctuating between the second and third tiers of Turkish football. A significant achievement during this era was winning the TFF Second League Group C title in the 2004–05 season, scoring a record 93 goals.

=== Rebranding and promotion to Süper Lig (2017–2019) ===
In June 2017, the club underwent a major restructuring and rebranding, changing its name to Gazişehir Gaziantep Futbol Kulübü. Under the presidency of Adil Sani Konukoğlu, the club aimed for the top flight. After losing the play-off final in the 2017–18 season, they secured promotion to the Süper Lig the following year by defeating Hatayspor in the 2018–19 play-off final. Following this promotion, the club adopted its current name, Gaziantep Futbol Kulübü (Gaziantep FK), in October 2019 to represent the entire city more broadly.

==== Earthquake Withdrawal and Return ====
In February 2023, Gaziantep F.K. withdrew from all competitions for the remainder of the 2022–23 season following the devastating 2023 Turkey–Syria earthquakes, which severely affected the city of Gaziantep. The Turkish Football Federation (TFF) accepted the withdrawal and guaranteed the club's place in the Süper Lig for the following season.

=== 2023–present: Return to Süper Lig and recent seasons ===
Following their withdrawal from the 2022–23 Süper Lig due to the 2023 Turkey–Syria earthquakes, Gaziantep FK returned to competition for the 2023–24 season. The club finished the campaign in 11th place with 44 points, securing their status in the top flight under the management of Selçuk İnan, who had taken charge during the season.

In the 2024–25 season, the team struggled to replicate their previous stability, eventually finishing in 14th place. Selçuk İnan departed the club by mutual agreement in May 2025, following a tenure of approximately one and a half years.

Ahead of the 2025–26 season, the club appointed former Turkish international Burak Yılmaz as head coach in August 2025. Yılmaz's tenure saw a period of turbulence in December 2025 when he announced his resignation following a home defeat to Göztepe, only to be reinstated shortly thereafter. As of early 2026, Yılmaz remained in charge as the team competed in the middle of the Süper Lig table.

== Crest and colors ==
The earliest colors of Gaziantep Futbol Kulübü were blue and white, reflecting the club’s identity at its foundation in the lower divisions. In June 2017, following a decision by the club council, the official colors were altered to a white-red-black combination, which has remained the primary palette ever since.

The club’s crest was redesigned at the same time as the color change. The modern emblem incorporates stylized elements inspired by the region’s cultural heritage, especially the layered pattern reminiscent of baklava slices, a symbol closely associated with Gaziantep’s culinary tradition.^{23} The use of red and black in the logo emphasizes dynamism and strength, while white provides contrast and visual balance.

The official colors are consistently featured across the team’s kits, merchandise, and branding. Red is the dominant primary color, often paired with black for trim and secondary elements, and white for accents in both home and away jerseys. These colors are intended to reflect the club’s ambition and the historical roots of Gaziantep’s sporting culture.

== Stadium ==
Gaziantep FK plays its home matches at the Gaziantep Stadium, a multi-purpose venue located in the Şehitkamil district of Gaziantep. The stadium has a seating capacity of approximately 33,502 spectators and features a hybrid grass surface. The club previously played at the Kamil Ocak Stadium, which served as the city's primary football venue from 1988 until January 2017. Following the opening of the new stadium, the Kamil Ocak Stadium was demolished in 2018. Between 2000 and 2005, during its time as Gaziantep Büyükşehir Belediyespor, the team also utilized the smaller GASKİ Stadium.

The new stadium was known as the Gaziantep Stadium for sponsorship reasons from its opening in 2017 until the end of the 2023–24 season. In August 2024, following the expiration of the sponsorship deal with Kalyon and a brief period without a title sponsor, the venue was renamed Gaziantep Stadium (Gaziantep Metropolitan Stadium) as part of a new agreement with the Gaziantep Metropolitan Municipality.

Following the 2023 Turkey–Syria earthquakes, which caused significant devastation in the region, Gaziantep FK withdrew from the remainder of the 2022–23 Süper Lig season. The stadium itself did not suffer irreparable structural failure, allowing the team to return to their home ground for the start of the 2023–24 season.

== Relationship with Gaziantepspor ==
Although they share a similar name and colors, Gaziantep F.K. is a distinct entity from the historic club Gaziantepspor, which was dissolved in 2020. Gaziantep F.K. was originally founded in 1988 as Sankospor and later competed for many years as Gaziantep Büyükşehir Belediyespor (Gaziantep BB).

Following Gaziantepspor's financial collapse and subsequent relegation from the Süper Lig, Gaziantep BB emerged as the primary representative of the city in professional football. To appeal to the city's fanbase and fill the void left by the former club, the team underwent a series of rebranding efforts. In June 2017, the club changed its name to Gazişehir Gaziantep. Two years later, in October 2019, the Turkish Football Federation (TFF) officially approved the club's request to change its name to Gaziantep Futbol Kulübü (Gaziantep F.K.).

Gaziantepspor, which had been the city's main club since 1969, officially ceased operations in July 2020 after declaring bankruptcy and withdrawing from the amateur leagues. While Gaziantep F.K. adopted the red and black colors associated with the city's footballing tradition, it has no legal connection to the dissolved club's debts or history.

== Honours ==
Sankospor

- TFF Third League
  - Winner: 1996–97 (Group 3)

Gaziantep Büyükşehir Belediyespor

- TFF Second League
  - Winner: 2004–05 (Group C)

Gazişehir Gaziantep

- TFF First League
  - Play-off winners: 2018–19

== Past seasons ==
=== Results of League and Cup Competitions by Season ===
The following is a list of seasons played by Gaziantep FK since its foundation in 1988. The club was founded as Sankospor (1988–1999), later becoming Gaziantep Büyükşehir Belediyespor (1999–2016), Gazişehir Gaziantep (2017–2019), and finally Gaziantep FK in 2019.

Season	League										Domestic Cup	Top goalscorer(s) (All competitions)	Ref
Season	Division	Pos	Pld	W	D	L	GF	GA	Pts	Info	Domestic Cup	Top goalscorer(s) (All competitions)	Ref
1988–93	During the 1988–93 season, Gaziantep FK competed at the amateur level.												
1993–94	3. Lig	3rd	24	10	8	6	33	22	38		~~N/A.~~	~~N/A.~~	
1994–95	3. Lig	9th	26	8	10	8	24	28	34		~~N/A.~~	~~N/A.~~	
1995–96	3. Lig	3rd	26	15	7	4	51	22	52		~~N/A.~~	~~N/A.~~	
1996–97	3. Lig	1st	34	27	4	3	66	15	85	Promoted	~~N/A.~~	~~N/A.~~	
1997–98	2. Lig	4th	32	12	9	11	42	34	45		3R	~~N/A.~~	
1998–99	2. Lig	4th	32	14	10	8	48	42	52		3R	~~N/A.~~	
1999–00	2. Lig	3rd	32	16	13	3	58	26	61		1R	~~N/A.~~	
2000–01	2. Lig	5th	32	12	8	12	51	45	44	Relegated (Note: Relegated to the newly formed 2. Lig B Category due to league restructuring.)	2R	~~N/A.~~	
2001–02	2. Lig B	2nd	32	19	7	6	66	28	64	Play-off - QF	3R	~~N/A.~~	
2002–03	2. Lig B	2nd	32	20	4	8	51	26	64		2R	~~N/A.~~	
2003–04	2. Lig B	4th	32	16	6	10	59	43	54		2R	~~N/A.~~	
2004–05	2. Lig B	1st	32	22	7	3	90	43	73	Promoted	2R	~~N/A.~~	
2005–06	1. Lig	13th	34	12	5	17	47	52	41		2R	~~N/A.~~	
2006–07	1. Lig	10th	34	10	12	12	47	48	42		GS	~~N/A.~~	
2007–08	1. Lig	14th	34	9	12	13	53	51	39		2R	~~N/A.~~	
2008–09	1. Lig	6th	34	10	10	14	35	40	40		GS	~~N/A.~~	
2009–10	1. Lig	12th	34	11	8	15	31	38	41		2R	~~N/A.~~	
2010–11	1. Lig	3rd	32	16	9	7	43	26	57	Play-off - Final	QF	(Turkey) Serdar Deliktaş (16)	
2011–12	1. Lig	14th	34	9	13	12	36	37	40		3R	(Turkey) Ramazan Altıntepe (8)	
2012–13	1. Lig	13th	34	11	8	15	37	43	41		4R	(Turkey) Serdar Deliktaş (12)	
2013–14	1. Lig	14th	36	10	11	15	30	47	41		4R	(Turkey) Serdar Deliktaş (13)	
2014–15	1. Lig	13th	34	10	11	13	38	47	41		GS	(Azerbaijan) Vagif Javadov (5)	
2015–16	1. Lig	8th	34	11	15	8	38	33	48		3R	(Serbia) Nemanja Kojić (9)	
2016–17	1. Lig	13th	34	9	10	15	37	46	37		3R	(Nigeria) Ekigho Ehiosun (10)	
2017–18	1. Lig	6th	34	15	8	11	57	38	53	Play-off - Final	3R	(Cameroon) Pierre Webó (8)	
2018–19	1. Lig	5th	34	17	8	9	60	31	59	Play-off Winners	3R	(Suriname) Rydell Poepon (11)	
2019–20	Süper Lig	8th	34	11	13	10	49	50	46		R16	(Nigeria) Olarenwaju Kayode (10)	
2020–21	Süper Lig	9th	40	15	13	12	59	51	58		R16	(Romania) Alexandru Maxim (15)	
2021–22	Süper Lig	15th	38	12	10	16	48	56	46		QF	(Romania) Alexandru Maxim (14)	
2022–23	Süper Lig	18th	36	6	7	23	31	72	25		QF (Note: Gaziantep FK withdrew from the league and cup in February 2023 following the 2023 Turkey–Syria earthquakes. Their rights were reserved, and they were not relegated.)	(Brazil) João Figueiredo (7)	
2023–24	Süper Lig	11th	38	12	8	18	50	57	44		R16	(Romania) Denis Drăguș (14)	
2024–25	Süper Lig	14th	36	12	9	15	45	50	45		GS	(Nigeria) David Okereke (9)	
2025–26	Süper Lig	8th	20	6	7	7	27	34	25		GS	(Guinea) Mohamed Bayo (8)	

=== League affiliation ===
- Süper Lig: 2019–
- TFF First League: 1997–2001, 2005–2019
- TFF Second League: 2001–2005
- TFF Third League: 1993–1997
- Turkish Regional Amateur League: 1988–1993

== Players ==
=== Current squad ===
As of 4 September 2026

Note: Flags indicate national team as defined under FIFA eligibility rules; some limited exceptions apply. Players may hold more than one non-FIFA nationality.

No.	Pos.	Nation	Player
2	DF	ESP	Luis Pérez
3	MF	CIV	Drissa Camara
4	DF	TUR	Arda Kızıldağ
5	DF	TUR	Efe Sarıkaya
6	MF	CIV	Ulrich Meleke
7	MF	CUW	Juninho Bacuna
8	MF	NGR	Victor Gidado
9	FW	JAM	Trivante Stewart (on loan from Maccabi Haifa)
10	MF	POL	Kacper Kozłowski
11	MF	TUR	Mirza Cihan
14	DF	SUR	Myenty Abena
17	MF	GAM	Karamba Gassama
18	DF	ROU	Deian Sorescu
19	FW	TUR	Serdar Dursun
21	DF	CIV	Abakar Sylla

No.	Pos.	Nation	Player
22	FW	CUW	Sontje Hansen (on loan from Middlesbrough)
23	DF	GER	Kerim Çalhanoğlu
25	GK	POL	Kacper Tobiasz
27	FW	BIH	Enver Kulašin
28	FW	TUR	Halil Dervişoğlu (on loan from Galatasaray)
30	DF	TUR	Nazım Sangaré
35	GK	TUR	Ataberk Dadakdeniz
44	MF	ROU	Alexandru Maxim (captain)
46	MF	TUR	Ali Osman Kalın
61	MF	TUR	Ogün Özçiçek
77	DF	TUR	Sabahattin Destici
81	GK	TUR	Cemilhan Aslan
95	GK	TUR	İbrahim Kağan Alkış
97	FW	TUR	Fuat Bavuk

=== Other players with contracts ===
Note: Flags indicate national team as defined under FIFA eligibility rules; some limited exceptions apply. Players may hold more than one non-FIFA nationality.

No. / Pos. / Nation / Player; — / DF / TUR / Burak Enes Yıkıcı	No. / Pos. / Nation / Player; — / MF / TUR / Taha Güneş

== Club Officials ==
=== Club Board ===
Position	Name
President	(Turkey) Memik Yılmaz
Vice President	(Turkey) İbrahim Dicle
Vice President	(Turkey) Ferit Güney Dağdeviren
Vice President	(Turkey) Serhat Tümer
Vice President	(Turkey) Mehmet Taşdelen
General Secretary	(Turkey) Seçil Kömürcü
Finance and Financial Affairs Coordinator	(Turkey) İsmail İnal
Football Branch Manager	(Turkey) Halil Uğur
Foreign Relations Coordinator	(Turkey) İbrahim Açıkgöz
Public Institutions and Legal Coordinator	(Turkey) Erim Arıkan
Tartar Liaison Officer	(Turkey) Engin Ateşsönmez
TFF Relations Coordinator	(Turkey) Özgür Yılmaz
Infrastructure Coordinator	(Turkey) Ergün Tatar
Development and Investment Coordinator	(Turkey) İbrahim Altunova
Store Coordinator	(Turkey) Ömer Çakmak
Marketing Coordinator	(Turkey) Bülent İngeç
Wheelchair Basketball Team Coordinator	(Turkey) Aydın Çiloğlu
Stadium and Security Coordinator	(Turkey) Zeki Ormanlı
Infrastructure Facilities Coordinator	(Turkey) Halil Demir

=== Technical Staff ===
Position	Name
Head coach	(Romania) Mirel Rădoi
Assistant Coach	(Romania) Ionut Stancu
Assistant Coach	(Romania) Mihai Ivanovschi
Athletic Performance Coach	(Turkey) Mustafa Aksoy
Athletic Performance Coach	(Turkey) Mustafa Burak Cağdanlıoğlu
Fitness Coach	(Romania) Horațiu Baciu
Analysis Coach	(Turkey) Tayfun Kayabaş
Analysis Video	(Romania) Denis Rădoi
Goalkeeper Coach	(Romania) Robert Tufiș

== Managerial History ==
Gaziantep FK has experienced significant managerial turnover, particularly following its rebranding and promotion to the Süper Lig. In the 2024–2025 season, the club was managed by Selçuk İnan, who had been appointed in March 2024 to replace Marius Șumudică. İnan departed by mutual consent in May 2025 after 428 days in charge.

For the 2025–2026 season, the club initially hired İsmet Taşdemir in June 2025, signing him to a 1+1 year contract. However, Taşdemir's tenure was short-lived; he parted ways with the club on August 18, 2025, following defeats in the first two weeks of the season against Galatasaray and Konyaspor. He was replaced by Burak Yılmaz, who resigned on December 15, 2025, only to be re-appointed four days later on December 19, 2025, following talks with club president Memik Yılmaz.

Managers of Gaziantep FK (Foundation–Present)
Name	Nat	From	To
Bünyamin Süral	(Turkey)	1994	1996
Şevket Kesler	(Turkey)	1996	1999
Mehmet Şahan	(Turkey)	1999	2001
Erol Azgın	(Turkey)	2001	2004
Ali Güneş	(Turkey)	2004	2005
Sedat Karabük	(Turkey)	2005	2006
Suat Kaya	(Turkey)	2006	2007
Bünyamin Süral	(Turkey)	2007	2008
Suat Kaya	(Turkey)	2008	2009
Cemal Gürsel Menteşe	(Turkey)	2009	2010
Erol Azgın	(Turkey)	2010	2011
Bünyamin Süral	(Turkey)	2011	2012
Mehmet Şahan	(Turkey)	2012	2013
Suat Kaya	(Turkey)	2013	2013
Hasan Özer	(Turkey)	2013	2014
Hakan Kutlu	(Turkey)	2014	2015
Bayram Bektaş	(Turkey)	2015	2016
Bülent Bölükbaşı	(Turkey)	2016	2016
Metin Diyadin	(Turkey)	2016	2017
Oğuz Çetin	(Turkey)	2017	2017
Hüseyin Kalpar	(Turkey)	2017	2017
Erkan Sözeri	(Turkey)	2017	2018
Yalçın Koşukavak	(Turkey)	2018	2018
Mehmet Altıparmak	(Turkey)	2018	2019
Marius Șumudică	(Romania)	2019	2021
Ricardo Sá Pinto	(Portugal)	2021	2021
Erol Bulut	(Turkey)	2021	2023
Erdal Güneş	(Turkey)	2023	2023
Marius Șumudică	(Romania)	2023	2024
Selçuk İnan	(Turkey)	2024	2025
İsmet Taşdemir	(Turkey)	2025	2025
Burak Yılmaz	(Turkey)	2025	2026
Mirel Rădoi	(Romania)	2026	Present

== Presidential history ==
The club has been led by various presidents since its foundation as Sankospor in 1988. The following is a list of presidents from the club's establishment, through its era as Gaziantep Büyükşehir Belediyespor (1999–2017), to its current identity as Gaziantep FK.

Name	From	To
(Turkey) Adil Sani Konukoğlu	1988	1992
(Turkey) Saip Konukoğlu	1992	-
(Turkey) Mehmet Erol Maraş	2004	2005
(Turkey) Saip Konukoğlu	2005	-
(Turkey) Ünsal Göksen	-	2014
(Turkey) Abdülkadir Gözegir	May 2014	November 2014
(Turkey) Osman Toprak	November 2014	June 2017
(Turkey) Adil Sani Konukoğlu	15 June 2017	12 September 2019
(Turkey) Mehmet Büyükekşi	12 September 2019	25 May 2021
(Turkey) Cevdet Akınal	25 May 2021	10 January 2023
(Turkey) Memik Yılmaz	10 January 2023	Present

=== Recent presidential history ===
Following the resignation of Cevdet Akınal in January 2023, Memik Yılmaz assumed the presidency. Yılmaz was officially elected as the club's chairman during the extraordinary general assembly held in June 2023 and was re-elected for another term on 13 June 2025. Under his leadership, the club navigated the aftermath of the 2023 Turkey–Syria earthquakes and continued to compete in the Süper Lig through the 2025–26 season.
