= Diyarbakırspor =

Turkish football club

- Full name: Diyarbakırspor Kulübü
- Nickname: Diyar (Land)
- Founded: 24 June 1968; 57 years ago
- Ground: Seyrantepe Sports Complex; Diyarbakır Stadium (sometimes)
- Capacity: 1,540; 33,000
- Chairman: Hacı Bedri Rıdvan
- Manager: Aytekin Yıldırım
- League: Turkish Regional Amateur League
- 2024–25: Turkish Regional Amateur League Group 1, 4th of 14

Diyarbakırspor Kulübü (Turkish pronunciation: [diˈjaɾbakɯɾspoɾ]) is a Turkish football club based in Diyarbakır, southeastern Turkey. Founded in 1968, the club competes in the Turkish Regional Amateur League, the fifth tier of the national football league system. Known colloquially as Diyar, the club has traditionally represented the region in both domestic and cultural contexts.

Diyarbakırspor made their top-flight debut in the 1977–78 Süper Lig season and went on to spend a total of 11 seasons in Turkey's highest division. The club experienced a sharp decline following the 2009–10 season, suffering consecutive relegations that eventually left them competing in the Diyarbakır Second Amateur League. In a remarkable turnaround beginning in 2018, Diyarbakırspor achieved three consecutive promotions to return to the national stage via the Regional Amateur League.

The club plays its home matches at the historic Diyarbakır Stadium, and its colours are red and green. Diyarbakırspor holds a strong symbolic status in southeastern Anatolia, where it has long served as a sporting and cultural emblem for the Kurdish-majority region.

== History ==
Diyarbakırspor was formed after the merger of Diclespor and Yıldızspor on 24 June 1968. Their club colours were red and green; red for Yıldızspor, green for Diclespor. Nejat Cemiloğlu was the first president of the club. The club competed in the 2.Lig from 1968 to 1975.

Under the guidance of president Ali Kahraman and vice-president Şeyhmus Akçadağ, Diyarbakırspor earned double promotion to the 1.Lig in 1976 and 1977. Diyarbakirspor were the first Turkish club to achieve the feat of double promotion, and second in the world, behind Nottingham Forest.

In the second season of top-flight football, Diyarbakırspor spent five weeks at the top of the table. However, they finished in fifth place at the end of the season. They also qualified for the Balkans Cup. Diyarbakırspor were relegated for the first time in 1980, earned promotion back to the top-flight the following season, and were relegated once more the next season. They spent three years in the 2.Lig before winning promotion to the 1.Lig.

At the end of the 1986–87 season, Diyarbakırspor finished with a record for lowest points in the 1. Lig with 11. The club would compete in the 2. Lig until 2001 before earning promotion back to the Süper Lig. Diyarbakırspor spent 5 years in the Süper Lig until relegation in 2006.

After finishing second in the 2008–09 TFF First League, Diyarbakırspor were promoted back to the Süper Lig, but finished 16th in the 2009–10 season to be relegated back to the TFF First League. In the 2010–11 season, the club finished last in the league to be relegated to the TFF Second League for the first time since 1976. In the 2011–12 season, they finished in the relegation zone to be relegated for the third consecutive season.

Later on, Diyarbakırspor withdrew from the Regional Amateur League, then returned to the Diyarbakır 1st Amateur League in the 2015–16 season, where they finished last and relegated to the Diyarbakır 2nd Amateur League. In the 2017–18 season, they gained promotion through play-offs, and in the 2019–20 season, they returned to the Turkish Regional Amateur League.

== Colours and badge ==
The club colours are red and green. They were the colours of the two clubs who merged to make up Diyarbakırspor, Yıldızspor (red) and Diclespor (green). The badge features the city walls of Diyarbakır. The city is home to the world's second largest walled structure, trailing behind the Great Wall of China. The badge also features a watermelon, a symbol of the city.

== Stadium ==
Diyarbakırspor plays most of their home matches at the Seyrantepe Sports Complex. The capacity is 1,540 seats.

== Honours ==
- TFF First League
  - Winners (3): 1976–77, 1980–81, 1985–86
  - Second place (2): 2000–01, 2008–09
- TFF Third League
  - Winners (2): 1975–1976, 2012–2013
- Turkish Cup
  - Semi-final (1): 1981–82
  - Quarter-final (3): 1978–79, 1980–81, 2004–05

== League affiliations ==
- Süper Lig: 1977–1980, 1981–1982, 1986–1987, 2001–2006, 2009–2010
- TFF First League: 1976–1977, 1980–1981, 1982–1986, 1987–2001, 2006–2009, 2010–2011
- TFF Second League: 1968–1976, 2011–2012
- TFF Third League: 2012–2013
- Turkish Regional Amateur League: 2013–2014, 2020–
