= 2007–08 Süper Lig =

50th season of top-tier Turkish football

Süper Lig
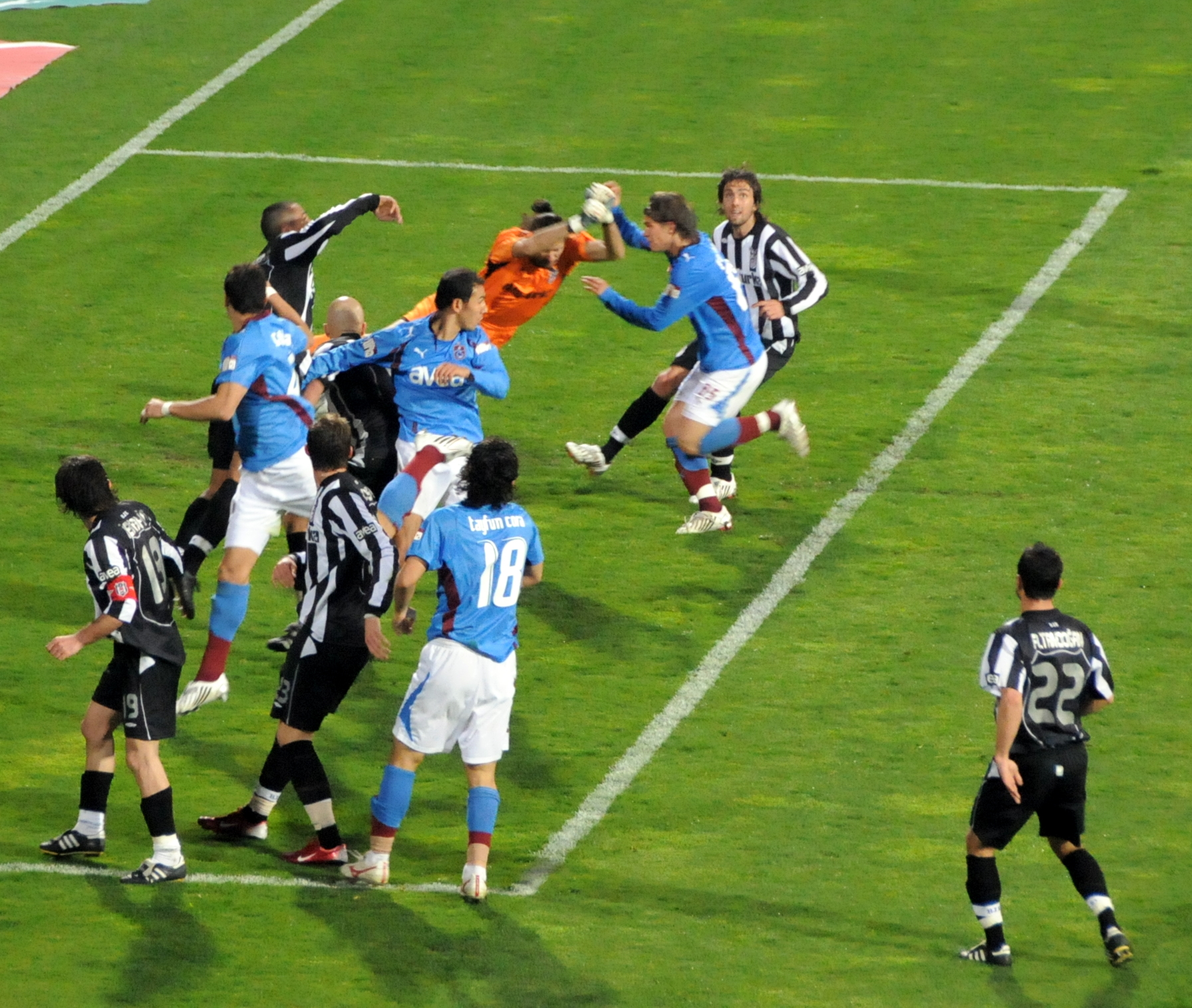
- Season: 2007–08
- Champions: Galatasaray; 17th title
- Relegated: Manisaspor; Çaykur Rizespor; Kasımpaşa
- Champions League: Galatasaray; Fenerbahçe
- UEFA Cup: Beşiktaş; Kayserispor
- Intertoto Cup: Sivasspor
- Matches: 306
- Goals: 786 (2.57 per match)
- Top goalscorer: Semih Şentürk (17)
- Biggest home win: Galatasaray 6–0 Konyaspor (16 September 2007)
- Biggest away win: Gaziantepspor 0–5 Fenerbahçe (20 January 2008)
- Highest scoring: Galatasaray 6–3 Manisaspor (9 February 2008) (9 goals)

The 2007–08 Süper Lig season, (also known as the Turkcell Süper Lig for sponsorship reasons), was the 50th anniversary of top-flight professional football in Turkey. It was won by Galatasaray, who won their 17th championship.

Since Turkey had climbed from 15th to 14th position in the UEFA association coefficient rankings at the end of the 2006–07 season, and UEFA Champions League-bound Zenit Saint Petersburg won the 2007–08 UEFA Cup, the domestic cup winner, Kayserispor, which had qualified for the second qualifying round of the 2008–09 UEFA Cup, was promoted to the first round, filling the unused title holder spot.

The league began on 10 August 2007 with the İstanbul B.B.–Fenerbahçe match at Atatürk Olympic Stadium.

The three relegated clubs would be replaced by three promoted clubs from the Bank Asya 1. Lig. Gençlerbirliği OFTAŞ and İstanbul B.B. both earned automatic promotion, while Altay, Diyarbakırspor, Kasımpaşa and Malatyaspor played in the play-off tournament with Kasımpaşa coming out victorious, becoming the third and last club to be promoted to the Süper Lig for 2007–08.

== Events ==
=== Matchday 1 ===
The league started with a surprise result, with İstanbul B.B. defeating giants Fenerbahçe 2–0. Another important event of the first week was the record of Hakan Şükür. By scoring two goals, he managed to reach to the record of the most goals scored domestically. The Trabzonspor–Sivasspor match was suspended due to "player and fan trouble", just minutes before the referee would end it. The Federation ultimately awarded a default 3–0 victory to Sivasspor. This caused a harsh opposition from the Trabzonspor side.

=== Matchday 7 ===
The first derby of the season was the main event of this week but the decision of Karl Heinz Feldkamp became the center of the discussion rather than the match between Galatasaray and Beşiktaş because he decided to exclude two important players of his team, Şükür and Lincoln, from the match squad. The reason was their disciplinary problems. This week is also worth mentioning because none of the matches ended with a draw.

=== Matchday 10 ===
Fenerbahçe, after collecting five points in three Champions League matches, faced the newcomer of the league, Kasımpaşa. Fenerbahçe hardly won the game which they were expected to dominate. On the other field of the competition, Galatasaray secured the victory in the last minutes and the surprise leader of the 9th Week, Sivasspor, was defeated by the desperate Konyaspor. One of the key events of the week was the transfer of Ersun Yanal, former national team manager, to Trabzonspor. Ziya Doğan left his seat after the shocking defeat at the hands of Beşiktaş in the 9th week where Trabzonspor lost its early advantage of 2–0 and ended up losing the game 2–3.

=== Matchday 24 ===
Beşiktaş hosted Galatasaray on their 319th randez-vous. Both teams had critical absences such as injured Bobo and suspended Lincoln. Beşiktaş won the game with final score of 1–0. Mert Nobre have scored to Galatasaray for the 6th time in his career as he already scored 3 whilst his Fenerbahçe spelling. Nobre could only score once in the first half of the season, then he accelerated his form and earned 6 goals until 24th week. Thereby, Beşiktaş captured the top of table after 137 weeks of the league. Almost entire Beşiktaş squad and board including chairman Yıldırım Demirören and coach Ertuğrul Sağlam had achieved the top position of the league for the very first time in their personal careers; squad exceptions were Serdar Özkan, Gökhan Zan, and captain İbrahim Üzülmez.

=== Matchday 28 ===
The most important match up of the weekend was between Beşiktaş and Fenerbahçe. Sarı Kanaryalar had already captured the leadership previous week, Beşiktaş was on target to overtake them again as the home side winner on last 6 weeks.

Fenerbahçe started the match well with the header of Alex after Colin Kazım-Richards' cross from the right side. Kazım will have been to score against Chelsea on next match in Champions League. Beşiktaş equalized the scoresheet with Serdar Özkan's goal; however, Alex closed the curtain with his second goal as he became the man of the match. This was a big impact on Beşiktaş due to the victory of Sivasspor as they even lost the second place which they would lose the chance to join Champions League next season. During the match, Yıldırım Demirören's mother got feel faint, it was diagnosed that she had a sudden hypertension. Demirören had to leave the match in early minutes. Alex was protested by Beşiktaş supporters after manipulated the situations during the corner kicks. The referee had added 4 and 8 minutes of stoppage time, sum of 12.

Galatasaray was fined by TFF and played against Gaziantepspor with no audience. This was the 6th match without the supporters this season due to be disciplined; nevertheless Cimbom was able to win 5 times that far. They had a 0–0 draw with Gaziantep.

=== Matchday 29 ===
Turkish Professional Discipline Board fined Beşiktaş for two matches, one to play in a neutral stadium and one with no audience due to manifestations consisting oaths on TFF and the referees in the match against Fenerbahçe previous weekend.

The most unexpected news was the resignation of Karl-Heinz Feldkamp from Galatasaray. Club officials declared that the reason was the opinion gap between Feldkamp and club board. On the later emerging news on the papers, it was claimed that the very last reason was Feldkamp's tactical changes on the team and selection before the match against Gençlerbirliği which did not consist Hakan Şükür, Hasan Şaş and Okan Buruk.

Sivasspor hosted Beşiktaş as Fenerbahçe did for Kayserispor in the very crucial encounters of the weekend. Galatasaray was the guest of Gençlerbirliği. All three matches finished with narrow scores, therefore Fenerbahçe kept going as the leader. Lincoln was the scorer for Cimbom.

İstanbul B.B. manager Abdullah Avcı was linked with Galatasaray after his successful performance throughout the season.

Former Beşiktaş player Pascal Nouma was in Turkey to follow the Beşiktaş' match as he claimed that his former team to reach the title at the end of the season.

=== Matchday 31 ===
Kasımpaşa were relegated to Bank Asya 1. Lig, after their away match loss against Bursaspor with a 1–0 score.

=== Matchday 32 ===
At the biggest game of the season, Galatasaray defeated Fenerbahçe 1–0 at the Ali Sami Yen Stadium and went three points clear at the top of the table. Çaykur Rizespor were relegated to Bank Asya 1. Lig, after their away match loss against Kayserispor with a 3–0 score.

=== Matchday 33 ===
Manisaspor Vestel Manisaspor were relegated to Bank Asya 1. Lig following a home loss against relegated Kasımpaşa with a 2–1 score. Galatasaray defeated Sivasspor 5–3 at an away match and took a big step to the title. Fenerbahçe defeated Gençlerbirliği 3–2 at home and guaranteed UEFA Champions League qualification.

=== Matchday 34 ===
Galatasaray won their 17th championship after defeating Gençlerbirliği OFTAŞ 2–0. Fenerbahçe finished in second position after losing 2–0 to Trabzonspor. Beşiktaş finished in third position, securing a UEFA Cup spot, after winning 5–1 against relegated Vestel Manisaspor. Sivasspor won 2–0 against Gençlerbirliği, but could only qualify for UEFA Intertoto Cup after finishing in fourth, behind Fenerbahçe and Beşiktaş, because of a poor head-to-head record against those two teams.

== League table ==
Pos	Team	Pld	W	D	L	GF	GA	GD	Pts	Qualification or relegation
1	Galatasaray (C)	34	24	7	3	64	23	+41	79	Qualification to Champions League third qualifying round
2	Fenerbahçe	34	22	7	5	72	37	+35	73 (Note: Fenerbahçe were ahead of Beşiktaş and Sivasspor on head-to-head points and Beşiktaş were ahead of Sivasspor on head-to-head goal difference: Fenerbahçe: 12 pts; Beşiktaş: 3 pts, 5–7 (–2); Sivasspor: 3 pts, 4–8 (–4).)	Qualification to Champions League second qualifying round
3	Beşiktaş	34	23	4	7	58	32	+26	73	Qualification to UEFA Cup second qualifying round
4	Sivasspor	34	23	4	7	57	29	+28	73	Qualification to Intertoto Cup second round
5	Kayserispor	34	15	10	9	50	31	+19	55	Qualification to UEFA Cup first round (Note: Kayserispor have won the 2007–08 Turkish Cup competition and thus are qualified for the first round of the UEFA Cup.)
6	Trabzonspor	34	14	7	13	44	39	+5	49	
7	Denizlispor	34	13	6	15	48	48	0	45	
8	MKE Ankaragücü	34	11	10	13	36	44	−8	43 (Note: Ankaragücü were ahead of Gaziantepspor on head-to-head away goals scored: Gaziantepspor–Ankaragücü 2–1, Ankaragücü–Gaziantepspor 1–0.)	
9	Gaziantepspor	34	11	10	13	36	45	−9	43	
10	Ankaraspor	34	10	11	13	35	38	−3	41	
11	Hacettepe Spor	34	10	10	14	30	36	−6	40	
12	İstanbul B.B.	34	10	8	16	44	47	−3	38 (Note: İstanbul B.B. were ahead of Bursaspor on head-to-head record: Bursaspor–İstanbul B.B. 2–2, İstanbul B.B.–Bursaspor 1–0.)	
13	Bursaspor	34	9	11	14	31	40	−9	38	
14	Konyaspor	34	10	6	18	37	64	−27	36	
15	Gençlerbirliği	34	9	8	17	44	51	−7	35	
16	Manisaspor (R)	34	7	8	19	42	62	−20	29 (Note: Manisaspor were ahead of Çaykur Rizespor and Kasımpaşa on head-to-head points: Manisaspor: 7 pts, Çaykur Rizespor: 6 pts, Kasımpaşa: 4 pts.)	Relegation to TFF First League
17	Çaykur Rizespor (R)	34	7	8	19	32	64	−32	29	Relegation to TFF First League
18	Kasımpaşa (R)	34	8	5	21	26	56	−30	29	Relegation to TFF First League

Rules for classification: 1) points; 2) goal difference; 3) number of goals scored.
(C) Champions; (R) Relegated

== Results ==
Home \ Away	ANG	ANK	BJK	BUR	ÇRZ	DEN	FEN	GSY	GAZ	GBR	GOF	İBB	KAS	KAY	KON	SİV	TRB	VMN
Ankaragücü		1–1	0–2	2–0	1–0	3–2	0–0	0–4	1–0	2–2	2–0	1–0	2–2	1–1	0–3	2–2	0–2	1–0
Ankaraspor	1–2		0–0	1–1	1–2	0–0	2–2	0–1	1–1	2–0	1–0	1–1	2–0	0–3	1–1	2–0	1–0	1–0
Beşiktaş	3–1	3–2		3–0	1–1	3–2	1–2	1–0	3–1	1–0	0–1	0–0	4–2	0–0	1–0	1–2	3–0	5–1
Bursaspor	2–1	0–0	0–1		2–1	1–1	1–1	0–1	1–1	2–1	1–1	2–2	1–0	0–1	1–0	0–1	1–1	1–0
Çaykur Rizespor	0–0	0–1	1–2	2–0		2–0	2–4	2–5	2–1	0–2	0–0	3–1	2–0	0–0	2–2	0–2	0–4	1–4
Denizlispor	1–1	1–0	1–2	0–0	5–1		0–1	1–2	2–1	3–2	2–1	2–3	0–1	2–0	2–1	1–2	2–0	3–2
Fenerbahçe	2–0	4–2	2–1	0–2	1–1	4–1		2–0	2–1	3–2	3–1	2–2	3–0	2–1	4–1	1–0	3–2	4–1
Galatasaray	1–0	0–0	2–1	1–0	4–0	2–1	1–0		0–0	3–2	2–0	2–2	0–1	2–0	6–0	2–0	1–0	6–3
Gaziantepspor	2–1	1–0	0–1	1–0	1–1	1–2	0–5	1–1		2–2	1–1	1–0	2–0	4–3	2–1	0–0	1–1	1–0
Gençlerbirliği	1–0	1–3	1–2	1–3	4–1	1–2	1–2	0–1	2–0		1–2	2–1	3–1	1–1	6–1	0–2	2–1	0–2
Gençlerbirliği OFTAŞ	2–1	0–0	0–1	2–2	2–0	0–2	1–1	0–0	1–2	1–1		3–2	0–1	1–1	0–1	0–1	0–2	1–0
İstanbul B.B.	1–2	0–1	2–1	1–0	2–1	0–2	2–0	0–3	1–2	0–0	1–0		2–0	1–1	5–0	0–2	1–2	4–1
Kasımpaşa	2–2	3–1	1–2	0–2	0–1	1–0	1–2	0–1	0–1	0–0	1–3	1–0		0–2	2–1	0–4	0–0	2–2
Kayserispor	0–2	3–1	2–0	4–1	3–0	1–1	2–1	1–1	3–1	3–0	1–1	1–2	2–0		3–0	0–1	1–0	3–1
Konyaspor	1–0	1–3	1–2	2–0	2–1	2–2	1–4	0–1	1–1	1–1	0–1	3–2	2–1	1–1		2–1	1–0	4–2
Sivasspor	3–2	2–1	1–2	3–2	0–0	2–0	1–4	3–5	2–0	2–0	1–0	2–1	4–0	1–0	3–0		2–0	1–0
Trabzonspor	0–0	2–1	2–3	2–1	5–1	2–0	2–0	0–1	3–2	0–0	1–2	2–1	2–1	2–1	1–0	0–3 (Note: The Trabzonspor – Sivasspor match in the first week was suspended. Sivasspor is awarded a 3–0 win.)		2–2
Vestel Manisaspor	1–2	2–1	1–2	1–1	2–1	3–2	1–1	2–2	1–0	1–2	0–2	1–1	1–2	0–1	2–0	1–1	1–1	

Legend: Blue = home team win; Yellow = draw; Red = away team win.

== Coaches ==
Team	Name	Nationality
Ankaragücü	Hakan Kutlu	
Ankaraspor	Safet Sušić	
Beşiktaş	Ertuğrul Sağlam	
Bursaspor	Samet Aybaba	
Denizlispor	Tuncay Özbek	
Fenerbahçe	Zico	
Galatasaray	Cevat Güler	
Gaziantepspor	Nurullah Sağlam	
Gençlerbirliği	Mesut Bakkal	
Gençlerbirliği OFTAŞ	Osman Özdemir	
İstanbul B.B.	Abdullah Avcı	
Kasımpaşa	Uğur Tütüneker	
Kayserispor	Tolunay Kafkas	
Konyaspor	Raşit Çetiner	
Vestel Manisaspor	Levent Eriş	
Çaykur Rizespor	Metin Diyadin	
Sivasspor	Bülent Uygun	
Trabzonspor	Ersun Yanal	

Below is the list of coaches who left their teams after the start of the season.

Team	Name	Nationality	Weeks in charge
Ankaragücü	Hans-Peter Briegel		1–9
Bursaspor	Bülent Korkmaz		1–9
Trabzonspor	Ziya Doğan		1–9
Ankaraspor	Aykut Kocaman		1–8
Gençlerbirliği	Fuat Çapa		1–5
Kasımpaşa	Ömer Kadri Özcan		1–7
Konyaspor	Nurullah Sağlam		1–6
Çaykur Rizespor	Samet Aybaba		1–2
Gençlerbirliği	Reinhard Stumpf		7–10
Kasımpaşa	Werner Lorant		9–14
Gaziantepspor	Mesut Bakkal		1–15
Gaziantepspor	Bünyamin Süral		16–20
Manisaspor	Giray Bulak		1–18
Galatasaray	Karl-Heinz Feldkamp		1–28
Çaykur Rizespor	Safet Sušić		4–20
Gençlerbirliği	Bülent Korkmaz		11–20
Ankaraspor	Hikmet Karaman		9–24
Manisaspor	Yılmaz Vural		19–25
Konyaspor	Ünal Karaman		7–27
Rizespor	Erdoğan Arıca		21–32
Denizlispor	Güvenç Kurtar		1–32

== Statistics ==
=== Top goalscorers ===
- Last updated on 10 May 2008

Rank	Player	Club	Goals
1	(Turkey) Semih Şentürk	Fenerbahçe	17
2	(Brazil) Alex	Fenerbahçe	16
3	(Slovakia) Filip Hološko	Vestel Manisaspor / Beşiktaş	15
4	(Mexico) Antonio de Nigris	Gaziantepspor / Ankaraspor	14
4	(Turkey) Mehmet Yıldız	Sivasspor	14
4	(Turkey) Umut Bulut	Trabzonspor	14
7	(Turkey) Necati Ateş	Ankaraspor / İstanbul B.B.	11
7	(Turkey) Ümit Karan	Galatasaray	11
7	(Turkey) Gökdeniz Karadeniz	Trabzonspor	11
7	(Turkey) Gökhan Ünal	Kayserispor	11
7	(Serbia) Mateja Kežman	Fenerbahçe	11
7	(Democratic Republic of the Congo) Shabani Nonda	Galatasaray	11
7	(Turkey) Hakan Şükür	Galatasaray	11
7	(Brazil) Deivid	Fenerbahçe	11

=== Top assists ===
- Last updated on 21 December 2008

Rank	Player	Club	Assists
1	(Brazil) Alex	Fenerbahçe	15
2	(Turkey) Mehmet Yıldız	Sivasspor	11
3	(Turkey) Erman Kılıç	İstanbul B.B.	10
3	(Slovakia) Filip Hološko	Manisaspor / Beşiktaş	10
5	(Turkey) Arda Turan	Galatasaray	9
5	(Brazil) Deivid	Fenerbahçe	9
5	(Turkey) Ibrahima Yattara	Trabzonspor	9
5	(Chile) Rodrigo Tello	Beşiktaş	9
9	(Egypt) Ayman Abdelaziz	Trabzonspor	8
9	(Turkey) Caner Celep	Denizlispor	8
9	(Argentina) Franco Cangele	Kayserispor	8
9	(Turkey) Mehmet Topuz	Kayserispor	8

=== Hat-tricks ===
Player	For	Against	Result	Date
(Turkey) Sinan Kaloğlu	Bursaspor	Gençlerbirliği	3–1	25 August 2007
(Mexico) Antonio de Nigris	Gaziantepspor	Kayserispor	4–3	16 September 2007
(Brazil) Adriano	İstanbul B.B.	Manisaspor	4–1	30 September 2007
(Brazil) Alex	Fenerbahçe	Ankaraspor	4–2	24 November 2007
(Turkey) Murat Hacıoğlu	Konyaspor	Ventel Manisaspor	4–2	9 December 2007
(Democratic Republic of the Congo) Shabani Nonda	Galatasaray	Çaykur Rizespor	5–2	12 January 2008
(Turkey) Burak Yılmaz	Manisaspor	Denizlispor	3–2	27 January 2008
(Turkey) Hakan Şükür	Galatasaray	Manisaspor	6–3	9 February 2008
(Bulgaria) Ivan Tsvetkov	Sivasspor	Kasımpaşa	4–0	30 March 2008
(Turkey) Arda Turan	Galatasaray	Sivasspor	5–3	4 May 2008

== Kit and shirt sponsors ==
Club	Kit maker	Shirt sponsor
Ankaragücü	Umbro	Turkcell
Ankaraspor	Nike	Turkcell
Beşiktaş	Umbro	Cola Turka
Bursaspor	Puma	Turkcell
Çaykur Rizespor	Adidas	Turkcell
Denizlispor	Kappa	Turkcell
Fenerbahçe	Adidas	Avea
Galatasaray	Adidas	Avea
Gaziantepspor	Lotto	Turkcell
Gençlerbirliği S.K.	Lotto	Turkcell
Gençlerbirliği OFTAŞ	Lotto	Turkcell
İstanbul B.B.	Lescon	Sunny
Kasımpaşa	Lotto	Turkcell
Kayserispor	Adidas	Turkcell
Konyaspor	Lotto	Turkcell
Sivasspor	Diadora	Turkcell
Trabzonspor	Puma	Avea
Vestel Manisaspor	Lescon	Vestel

== Stadiums ==
Team	Stadium	Capacity
Büyükşehir Belediyespor	Atatürk Olympic Stadium	82,000
Fenerbahçe	FB Şükrü Saracoğlu Stadium	55,509
Beşiktaş	BJK İnönü Stadium	32,086
Kayserispor	Kayseri Atatürk Stadium	25,918
Galatasaray	Ali Sami Yen Stadium	23,785
Konyaspor	Konya Atatürk Stadium	22,459
Trabzonspor	Hüseyin Avni Aker Stadium	19,649
MKE Ankaragücü	Ankara 19 Mayıs Stadium	19,209
Gençlerbirliği	Ankara 19 Mayıs Stadium	19,209
Gençlerbirliği Oftaşspor	Ankara 19 Mayıs Stadium	19,209
Bursaspor	Bursa Atatürk Stadium	18,587
Denizlispor	Denizli Atatürk Stadium	15,459
Kasımpaşa	Recep Tayyip Erdoğan Stadium	13,500
Gaziantepspor	Gaziantep Kamil Ocak Stadium	14,325
Sivasspor	Sivas 4 Eylül Stadium	11,500
Çaykur Rizespor	Rize Atatürk Stadium	10,459
Vestel Manisaspor	Manisa 19 Mayıs Stadium	10,025
Ankaraspor	Yenikent Asaş Stadium	25,000

- Kasımpaşa temporarily played their first 12 home matches at Atatürk Olympic Stadium, due to ongoing renovations at their home stadium. Her stadium's capacity was extended from 9,576 to 13, 5000 during the renovations.
- Galatasaray temporarily played their first home match at Atatürk Olympic Stadium, due to ongoing renovations at their home stadium.

== Teams promoted/relegated ==
The teams promoted from the TFF First League for the 2006–07 season:

- Gençlerbirliği OFTAŞ (1st)
- İstanbul B.B. (2nd)
- Kasımpaşa S.K. (Play-off winner)

The teams relegated to the TFF First League for the 2006–07 season:

- Sakaryaspor (18th)
- Kayseri Erciyesspor (17th)
- Antalyaspor (16th)

== Foreign players ==
Club	Player 1	Player 2	Player 3	Player 4	Player 5	Player 6	Player 7	Former Players
Ankaragücü	(Brazil) Jabá	(Cameroon) Gustave Bebbe	(Egypt) Ibrahim Said	(Ghana) Augustine Ahinful	(Guinea) Kaba Diawara	(Romania) Giani Kiriță	(Uruguay) Andrés Lamas	(Brazil) André Silva (Brazil) Mateus (Czech Republic) Jiří Mašek (Ghana) Habib Mohamed (Lithuania) Gediminas Paulauskas
Ankaraspor	(Brazil) Tita	(Mexico) Antonio de Nigris	(Montenegro) Radoslav Batak	(Portugal) Neca	(Slovakia) Štefan Senecký	(Sweden) Fredrik Risp	(Togo) Hamílton	(Brazil) Mateus Paraná
Beşiktaş	(Argentina) Matías Delgado	(Brazil) Bobô	(Brazil) Ricardinho	(Chile) Rodrigo Tello	(Croatia) Gordon Schildenfeld	(France) Édouard Cissé	(Slovakia) Filip Hološko	(Argentina) Federico Higuaín (Senegal) Lamine Diatta
Bursaspor	(Belarus) Maksim Romaschenko	(Belgium) Jason Vandelannoite	(Bolivia) Ronald Gutiérrez	(Cameroon) Hervé Tum	(Peru) Ysrael Zúñiga	(Venezuela) Renny Vega	(Zambia) Collins Mbesuma	(Guinea) Mohamed Cissé (North Macedonia) Veliče Šumulikoski (Romania) Daniel Pancu
Çaykur Rizespor	(Brazil) Anderson	(Brazil) Elionar Bombinha	(Brazil) Leandro Chaves	(Brazil) Marquinhos	(Colombia) David González	(Colombia) Gustavo Victoria	(Croatia) Igor Gal	
Denizlispor	(Benin) Christian Kotchoni	(Brazil) Carlos Alberto	(Brazil) Júlio César	(Cameroon) Souleymanou Hamidou	(Czech Republic) Tomáš Abrahám	(Senegal) Pape Gueye	(Slovakia) Roman Kratochvíl	(Brazil) Allyson
Fenerbahçe	(Brazil) Alex	(Brazil) Deivid	(Brazil) Edu Dracena	(Brazil) Roberto Carlos	(Chile) Claudio Maldonado	(Serbia) Mateja Kežman	(Uruguay) Diego Lugano	(Ghana) Stephen Appiah
Galatasaray	(Algeria) Ismaël Bouzid	(Argentina) Marcelo Carrusca	(Brazil) Lincoln	(Cameroon) Rigobert Song	(Democratic Republic of the Congo) Shabani Nonda	(Ghana) Ahmed Barusso	(Sweden) Tobias Linderoth	
Gaziantepspor	(Argentina) Christian Zurita	(Brazil) Beto	(Brazil) Ivan	(Cameroon) Armand Deumi	(Chile) Manuel Neira			(Mexico) Antonio de Nigris (Slovakia) Tomáš Sedlák
Gençlerbirliği	(Brazil) Kahê	(Burkina Faso) Lamine Traoré	(Chile) Nicolás Peric	(Ghana) Adamu Mohammed	(Ghana) Daniel Addo	(Nigeria) Isaac Promise		(Australia) Nick Carle (Brazil) Sandro (Serbia) Marko Zorić (Serbia) Nikola Petković
Gençlerbirliği OFTAŞ	(Brazil) Sandro	(Brazil) Tozo	(Ghana) James Boadu	(Ghana) Shaibu Yakubu	(Serbia) Nikola Petković			(Australia) Mile Sterjovski (Serbia) Aleksandar Jevtić
İstanbul B.B.	(Bosnia and Herzegovina) Kenan Hasagić	(Brazil) Adriano	(Brazil) Marcus Vinícius	(Namibia) Razundara Tjikuzu				(Uruguay) Sergio Órteman
Kasımpaşa	(Bosnia and Herzegovina) Edin Ademović	(Brazil) André Moritz	(Brazil) Fransérgio	(Cameroon) Joseph Mawaye	(Denmark) Jens Askou	(Morocco) Khalid Sinouh		(France) Jonathan Téhoué (Mali) Mamoutou Coulibaly (Senegal) Ely Cissé
Kayserispor	(Argentina) Franco Cángele	(Argentina) Leonardo Iglesias	(Argentina) Juan Pablo Avendaño	(Bulgaria) Dimitar Ivankov	(Cameroon) Alioum Saidou	(Paraguay) Delio Toledo		
Konyaspor	(Brazil) Kauê	(Brazil) Washington	(France) Cédric Sabin	(France) Jonathan Téhoué	(Portugal) José Gomes	(Serbia) Damir Kahriman	(Serbia) Miloš Mihajlov	(Egypt) Mohamed Abdullah (Portugal) Neca
Sivasspor	(Australia) Michael Petkovic	(Brazil) Sérgio	(Bulgaria) Ivan Tsvetkov	(Guinea) Kanfory Sylla	(Guinea) Mamadou Diallo	(Israel) Pini Balili	(Tunisia) Karim Saidi	(Nigeria) Robert Akaruye
Trabzonspor	(Brazil) Jefferson	(Egypt) Sayed Moawad	(Guinea) Daouda Jabi					(Czech Republic) Tomáš Jun (Sweden) Fredrik Risp
Vestel Manisaspor	(Brazil) Allyson	(Colombia) Neco Martínez	(Denmark) Thomas Dalgaard	(France) Stéphane Borbiconi	(Guinea) Oumar Kalabane	(Portugal) Targino	(Portugal) Zé António	(Czech Republic) Josef Dvorník (Czech Republic) Lukáš Zelenka (Slovakia) Filip Hološko

== 2007–08 fixtures ==
2008 Turkcell Super League Fixture List

weekly Turkish Turkcell Super League Reviews and news by Ahmet Turgut
