= 2008–09 Süper Lig =

51st season of top-tier Turkish football

Süper Lig
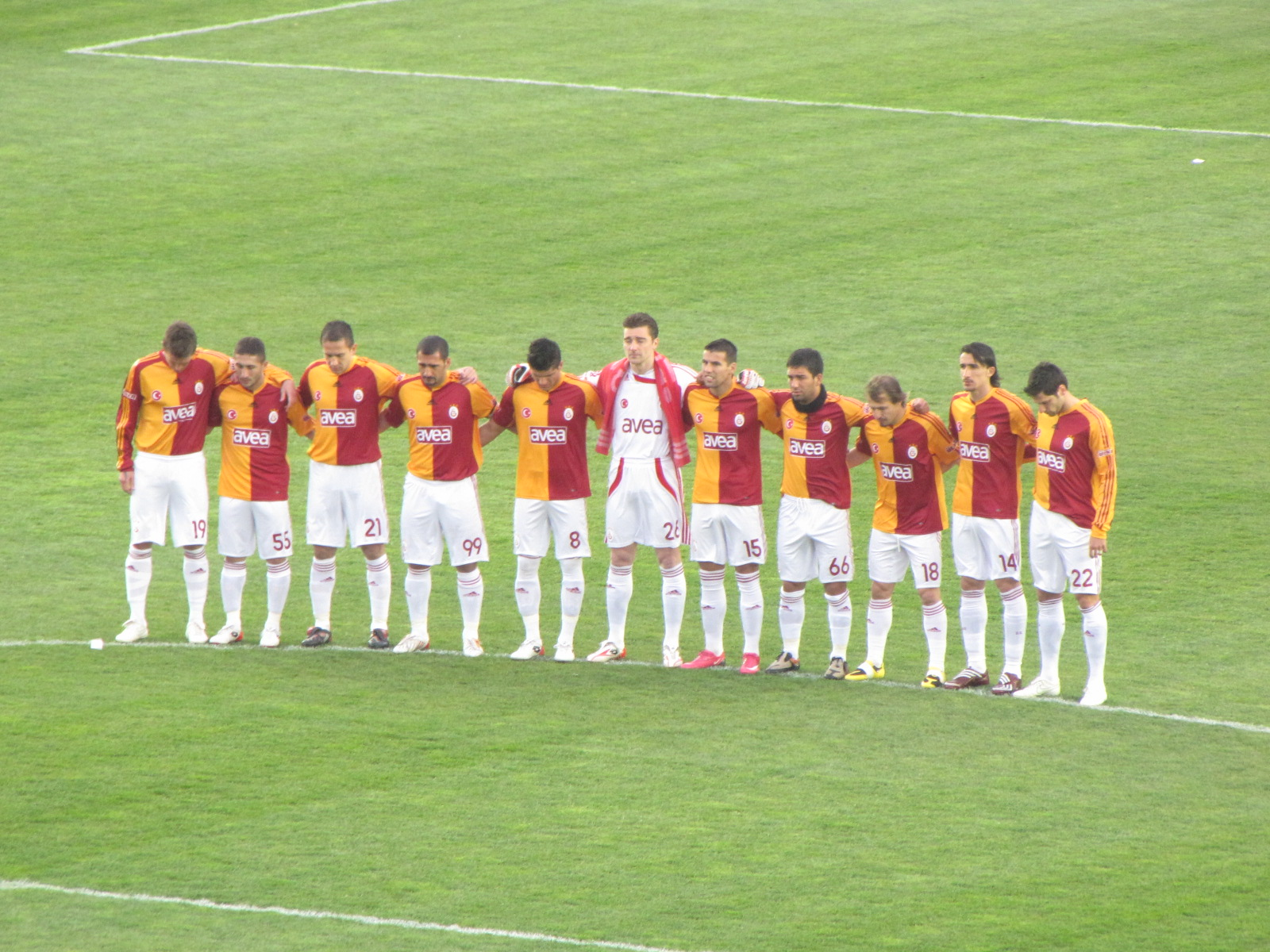
- Season: 2008–09
- Champions: Beşiktaş; 13th title
- Relegated: Konyaspor; Kocaelispor; Hacettepe SK
- Champions League: Beşiktaş; Sivasspor
- Europa League: Trabzonspor; Fenerbahçe; Galatasaray
- Matches: 306
- Goals: 787 (2.57 per match)
- Top goalscorer: Milan Baroš (20)
- Biggest home win: Fenerbahçe 7–0 Hacettepe
- Biggest away win: İstanbul B.B. 0–4 Trabzonspor; Hacettepespor 0–4 Kocaelispor
- Highest scoring: 10 matches with 7 goals each

The 2008–09 Süper Lig (also known as Turkcell Super League due to sponsoring reasons) was the fifty-first season since its establishment. It began on 22 August 2008 and ended on 31 May 2009. Galatasaray were the defending champions.

Beşiktaş clinched the championship after winning at Denizlispor on the last matchday. The latter barely avoided relegation after finishing in a three-way tie on points with Gençlerbirliği and Konyaspor. Head-to-head comparison between those three teams eventually resulted in the demotion of Konyaspor, who joined Kocaelispor and Hacettepe on their way to the second-level First League.

Fenerbahçe and Galatasaray had to settle for fourth and fifth place, respectively, after Sivasspor came in as runners-up and Trabzonspor finished third. The final positions for the three Istanbul clubs marked the first time since the 1980–81 season that only one of them was able to finish among the top three teams in Turkish football.

== Promotion and relegation from 2007–08 ==
Çaykur Rizespor, Manisaspor and Kasımpaşa were relegated at the end of the 2007–08 season after finishing on the bottom three places of the standings. They were replaced by TFF First League champions Kocaelispor, runners-up Antalyaspor and play-off winners Eskişehirspor.

== Team overview ==
Location of teams in Süper Lig 2008–09

Team	Head coach	Team captain	Venue	Capacity	Kitmaker	Shirt sponsor	Club Chairman
Ankaragücü	(Turkey) Hakan Kutlu	(Turkey) Murat Erdoğan	Ankara 19 Mayıs Stadium	19,209	Lotto	Turkcell	Cemal Azmi Aydın
Ankaraspor	(Turkey) Aykut Kocaman	(Turkey) Hürriyet Güçer	Yenikent Asaş Stadium	19,626	Nike	Turkcell	Ruhi Kurnaz
Antalyaspor	(Turkey) Mehmet Özdilek	(Turkey) Uğur Kavuk	Antalya Atatürk Stadium	11,137	Nike	Mardan	Hasan Y. Akıncıoğlu
Beşiktaş	(Turkey) Mustafa Denizli	(Argentina) Matías Delgado	BJK İnönü Stadium	32,086	Umbro	Cola Turka	Yıldırım Demirören
Bursaspor	(Turkey) Ertuğrul Sağlam	(Turkey) Ömer Erdoğan	Bursa Atatürk Stadium	18,587	Kappa	Turkcell	İbrahim Yazıcı
Denizlispor	(Turkey) Mesut Bakkal	(Slovakia) Roman Kratochvil	Denizli Atatürk Stadium	15,427	Lescon	Turkcell	Ali İpek
Eskişehirspor	(Turkey) Rıza Çalımbay	(Turkey) Emre Toraman	Eskişehir Atatürk Stadium	18,880	Nike	Eti	Halil Ünal
Fenerbahçe	(Spain) Luis Aragonés	(Brazil) Alex	Şükrü Saracoğlu Stadium	53,586	Adidas	Avea	Aziz Yıldırım
Galatasaray	(Turkey) Bülent Korkmaz	(Turkey) Ayhan Akman	Ali Sami Yen Stadium	22,800	Adidas	Avea	Adnan Polat
Gaziantepspor	(Portugal) José Couceiro	(Turkey) Bekir İrtegün	Gaziantep Kamil Ocak Stadium	16,981	Lescon	Turkcell	İbrahim Halil Kızıl
Gençlerbirliği	(Turkey) Samet Aybaba	(Egypt) Abdel Zaher El Saka	Ankara 19 Mayıs Stadium	19,209	Lotto	Turkcell	İlhan Cavcav
Hacettepe	(Turkey) Erdoğan Arıca	(Turkey) Orhan Şam	Ankara 19 Mayıs Stadium	19,209	Lotto	Turkcell	Turgay Kalemci
Istanbul BB	(Turkey) Abdullah Avcı	(Turkey) Efe İnanç	Atatürk Olympic Stadium	76,092	Lescon	KalPen	Göksel Gümüşdağ
Kayserispor	(Turkey) Tolunay Kafkas	(Turkey) Mehmet Topuz	Kadir Has Stadium^{1}	32,864	Adidas	Turkcell	Recep Mamur
Kocaelispor	(Turkey) Erhan Altın	(Turkey) Serdar Topraktepe	Ismet Pasa Stadium	12,710	Umbro	Erciyas	Serhan Gürkan
Konyaspor	(Turkey) Ünal Karaman	(Turkey) Ömer Gündostu	Konya Atatürk Stadium	21,968	Lotto	Turkcell	Mehmet Ali Kuntoğlu
Sivasspor	(Turkey) Bülent Uygun	(Turkey) Mehmet Yildiz	Sivas 4 Eylül Stadium	14,998	Adidas	Turkcell	Mecnun Otyakmaz
Trabzonspor	(Turkey) Ersun Yanal	(Turkey) Hüseyin Çimşir	Hüseyin Avni Aker Stadium	19,649	Nike	Avea	Sadri Şener

Notes

1. Kayserispor played their 2008 home matches at Kayseri Atatürk Stadium. Before moving to their current stadium in March 2009, the team played several home matches at 5 Ocak Stadium in Adana.

=== Managerial changes ===
Team	Outgoing manager	Manner of departure	Date of vacancy	Replaced by	Date of appointment
Konyaspor	(Turkey) Raşit Çetiner	Sacked	17 September 2008	(Turkey) Giray Bulak	24 September 2008
Kocaelispor	(Turkey) Engin İpekoğlu	Sacked	25 September 2008	(Turkey) Yılmaz Vural	28 September 2008
Beşiktaş	(Turkey) Ertuğrul Sağlam	Resigned	7 October 2008	(Turkey) Mustafa Denizli	9 October 2008
Ankaragücü	(Turkey) Hakan Kutlu	Sacked	20 October 2008	(Turkey) Ünal Karaman	24 October 2008
Antalyaspor	(Czech Republic) Jozef Jarabinský	Sacked	28 October 2008	(Turkey) Mehmet Özdilek	28 October 2008
Hacettepe	(Turkey) Osman Özdemir	Resigned	2 November 2008	(Turkey) Erdoğan Arıca	3 November 2008
Denizlispor	(Turkey) Ali Yalçın	Resigned	2 November 2008	(Turkey) Ümit Kayıhan	10 November 2008
Gençlerbirliği	(Turkey) Mesut Bakkal	Resigned	3 November 2008	(Turkey) Samet Aybaba	5 November 2008
Bursaspor	(Turkey) Samet Aybaba	Resigned	4 November 2008	(Turkey) Güvenç Kurtar	4 November 2008
Ankaragücü	(Turkey) Ünal Karaman	Resigned	8 December 2008	(Turkey) Hakan Kutlu	2 January 2009
Bursaspor	(Turkey) Güvenç Kurtar	Resigned	23 December 2008	(Turkey) Ertuğrul Sağlam	2 January 2009
Kocaelispor	(Turkey) Yılmaz Vural	Resigned	29 December 2008	(Turkey) Erhan Altın	17 January 2009
Denizlispor	(Turkey) Ümit Kayıhan	Sacked	5 February 2009	(Turkey) Mesut Bakkal	6 February 2009
Galatasaray	(Germany) Michael Skibbe	Sacked	23 February 2009	(Turkey) Bülent Korkmaz	23 February 2009
Hacettepe	(Turkey) Erdoğan Arıca	Resigned	2 March 2009	(Turkey) Ergün Penbe	2 March 2009
Gaziantepspor	(Turkey) Nurullah Sağlam	Resigned	9 March 2009	(Portugal) José Couceiro	6 April 2009
Konyaspor	(Turkey) Giray Bulak	Sacked	19 May 2009	(Turkey) Ünal Karaman	20 May 2009

=== Foreign players ===
Club	Player 1	Player 2	Player 3	Player 4	Player 5	Player 6	Player 7	Player 8	Former Players
Ankaragücü	(Algeria) Ismaël Bouzid	(Brazil) Jabá	(Brazil) Luiz Henrique	(Argentina) Leonardo Iglesias	(Mexico) Antonio de Nigris	(Tunisia) Mouin Chaâbani			(Brazil) Leandro Chaves (Egypt) Sherif Ekramy
Ankaraspor	(Gabon) Roguy Méyé	(Liberia) Theo Lewis Weeks	(Montenegro) Radoslav Batak	(Portugal) Neca	(Senegal) Madiou Konate	(Slovakia) Štefan Senecký			(Brazil) Tita (Mexico) Antonio de Nigris (Sweden) Fredrik Risp
Antalyaspor	(Brazil) Tita	(Ivory Coast) Serge Djiéhoua	(Tunisia) Ali Zitouni	(Zimbabwe) Joseph Ngwenya					(Poland) Jarosław Bieniuk (Poland) Piotr Dziewicki (Slovakia) Pavol Straka
Beşiktaş	(Argentina) Matías Delgado	(Chile) Rodrigo Tello	(Brazil) Bobô	(Czech Republic) Tomáš Sivok	(Czech Republic) Tomáš Zápotočný	(France) Édouard Cissé	(Germany) Fabian Ernst	(Slovakia) Filip Hološko	(Croatia) Anthony Šerić
Bursaspor	(Belarus) Maksim Romaschenko	(Brazil) Fabrício	(Brazil) Marcelinho	(Brazil) Tadeu	(Bulgaria) Dimitar Ivankov	(Romania) Giani Kiriță	(South Korea) Shin Young-rok		(Brazil) Adriano Magrão (Brazil) Leandrao (Peru) Ysrael Zúñiga
Denizlispor	(Bosnia and Herzegovina) Džemal Berberović	(Brazil) Carlos Alberto	(Brazil) Douglas	(Brazil) Irineu	(Brazil) Wescley	(Bulgaria) Emil Angelov	(Senegal) Ibrahima Bangoura	(Trinidad and Tobago) Darryl Roberts	(Czech Republic) Tomáš Abrahám (Slovakia) Ivan Lietava (Slovakia) Roman Kratochvíl (Venezuela) Renny Vega
Eskişehirspor	(Bosnia and Herzegovina) Safet Nadarević	(Brazil) Anderson	(Croatia) Krunoslav Lovrek	(Croatia) Luka Vučko	(Croatia) Stjepan Poljak	(Croatia) Vanja Iveša			
Fenerbahçe	(Brazil) Alex	(Brazil) Deivid	(Brazil) Edu Dracena	(Brazil) Roberto Carlos	(Chile) Claudio Maldonado	(Spain) Dani Güiza	(Spain) Josico	(Uruguay) Diego Lugano	
Galatasaray	(Australia) Harry Kewell	(Brazil) Lincoln	(Czech Republic) Milan Baroš	(Democratic Republic of the Congo) Shabani Nonda	(Italy) Morgan De Sanctis	(Sweden) Tobias Linderoth			(Portugal) Fernando Meira
Gaziantepspor	(Argentina) Christian Zurita	(Brazil) Beto	(Brazil) Eduardo Pacheco	(Brazil) Ivan	(Brazil) Júlio César	(Brazil) Rodrigo Tabata	(Cameroon) Armand Deumi		
Gençlerbirliği	(Australia) Bruce Djite	(Australia) Mile Jedinak	(Australia) James Troisi	(Brazil) Kahê	(Burkina Faso) Lamine Traoré	(Cameroon) Jacques Momha	(Ghana) Daniel Addo	(Serbia) Bojan Isailović	(Chile) Nicolás Peric
Hacettepe	(Albania) Gilman Lika	(Brazil) Sandro	(Brazil) Tozo	(Croatia) Ante Kulušić	(Democratic Republic of the Congo) Patiyo Tambwe	(Ivory Coast) François Zoko			(Albania) Admir Teli (Albania) Xhevahir Sukaj (Egypt) Amir Azmy (Ghana) Shaibu Yakubu
İstanbul B.B.	(Bosnia and Herzegovina) Kenan Hasagić	(Brazil) Adriano	(Brazil) Marcus Vinícius	(Brazil) Marquinhos	(Cameroon) Gustave Bebbe	(Namibia) Razundara Tjikuzu	(Poland) Marcin Kuś		
Kayserispor	(Argentina) Franco Cángele	(Cameroon) Alioum Saidou	(Cameroon) Salomon Olembé	(Cameroon) Souleymanou Hamidou	(Montenegro) Milan Purović	(Nigeria) Julius Aghahowa	(Paraguay) Delio Toledo		(Argentina) Matías Escobar
Kocaelispor	(Azerbaijan) Ramal Huseynov	(Azerbaijan) Rashad Sadygov	(Brazil) Júlio César	(Cameroon) Patrice Nzekou	(Democratic Republic of the Congo) Mazowa N'sumbu	(Nigeria) Akeem Agbetu	(Scotland) Maurice Ross	(Slovenia) Luka Žinko	(Brazil) Fransérgio (Serbia) Đorđe Tutorić (Serbia) Dušan Anđelković (Serbia) Nenad Jestrović
Konyaspor	(Brazil) Jefferson	(Brazil) Kauê	(Norway) Branimir Poljac	(Serbia) Miloš Mihajlov	(Slovakia) Roman Kratochvíl				(France) Jonathan Téhoué
Sivasspor	(Australia) Michael Petkovic	(Brazil) Fábio Bilica	(Brazil) Sérgio	(Cameroon) Hervé Tum	(France) Yannick Kamanan	(Guinea) Kanfory Sylla	(Guinea) Mamadou Diallo		
Trabzonspor	(Argentina) Gustavo Colman	(Brazil) Alanzinho	(Cameroon) Rigobert Song	(Croatia) Hrvoje Čale	(Nigeria) Isaac Promise	(Senegal) Tony Sylva			

== Standings ==
Pos	Team	Pld	W	D	L	GF	GA	GD	Pts	Qualification or relegation
1	Beşiktaş (C)	34	21	8	5	60	30	+30	71	Qualification to Champions League group stage
2	Sivasspor	34	19	9	6	54	28	+26	66	Qualification to Champions League third qualifying round
3	Trabzonspor	34	19	8	7	54	34	+20	65	Qualification to Europa League play-off round
4	Fenerbahçe	34	18	7	9	60	36	+24	61	Qualification to Europa League third qualifying round
5	Galatasaray	34	18	7	9	57	39	+18	61	Qualification to Europa League second qualifying round (Note: 2008–09 Turkish Cup was won by Champions League-qualified side Beşiktaş. Since cup runners-up Fenerbahçe secured a place in the European competitions via league position, the spot allocation for the 2009–10 UEFA Europa League effectively reverted to league positions.)
6	Bursaspor	34	16	10	8	47	36	+11	58	
7	Kayserispor	34	13	11	10	38	26	+12	50	
8	Gaziantepspor	34	12	11	11	46	48	−2	47	
9	İstanbul B.B.	34	12	6	16	37	46	−9	42	
10	Ankaraspor	34	11	8	15	36	42	−6	41	
11	Eskişehirspor	34	10	10	14	45	49	−4	40 (Note: Trabzonspor were ahead of Antalyaspor on head-to-head record: Eskişehirspor–Antalyaspor 2–0, Antalyaspor–Eskişehirspor 0–0.)	
12	Antalyaspor	34	10	10	14	34	42	−8	40	
13	MKE Ankaragücü	34	11	6	17	36	47	−11	39	
14	Gençlerbirliği	34	10	8	16	38	50	−12	38 (Note: Gençlerbirliği were ahead of Denizlispor and Konyaspor on head-to-head points and goal difference: Gençlerbirliği: 6 pts, 5–4 (+1); Denizlispor: 6 pts, 5–4 (+1); Konyaspor: 2 pts, 4–6 (–2).)	
15	Denizlispor	34	11	5	18	39	52	−13	38	
16	Konyaspor (R)	34	10	8	16	35	46	−11	38	Relegation to TFF First League
17	Kocaelispor (R)	34	8	5	21	47	73	−26	29	Relegation to TFF First League
18	Hacettepe Spor (R)	34	5	7	22	24	63	−39	22	Relegation to TFF First League

Rules for classification: 1st points; 2nd head-to-head points; 3rd head-to-head goal difference; 4th head-to-head goals scored; 5th head-to-head away goals scored; 6th goal difference; 7th goals scored
(C) Champions; (R) Relegated

=== Positions by round ===
Team ╲ Round	1	2	3	4	5	6	7	8	9	10	11	12	13	14	15	16	17	18	19	20	21	22	23	24	25	26	27	28	29	30	31	32	33	34
MKE Ankaragücü	14	17	16	15	11	14	16	16	16	17	15	14	13	15	15	14	16	16	16	15	16	14	15	16	16	16	16	15	13	10	13	15	12	13
Ankaraspor	17	18	13	9	8	8	6	3	2	2	3	3	6	5	5	5	4	5	6	6	6	6	6	6	9	9	9	8	8	9	9	9	10	10
Antalyaspor	13	16	15	17	17	17	17	17	17	15	16	15	15	16	16	16	14	14	14	12	14	16	16	14	13	10	12	10	11	11	14	14	15	12
Beşiktaş	3	1	2	1	4	3	1	1	4	3	2	2	2	6	6	6	6	6	4	5	3	3	2	2	2	2	2	2	2	2	1	1	1	1
Bursaspor	5	3	5	3	2	2	3	5	7	8	8	9	8	8	9	9	9	9	9	9	8	8	8	7	6	6	6	6	6	6	6	6	6	6
Denizlispor	18	9	11	11	13	10	13	14	14	13	13	12	14	14	14	13	15	15	15	16	15	13	12	11	12	14	15	13	15	14	15	13	14	15
Eskişehirspor	9	10	14	14	15	13	11	10	10	11	11	13	10	10	10	11	10	10	10	11	11	10	11	12	10	11	10	11	12	15	11	10	11	11
Fenerbahçe	16	7	12	8	10	12	10	9	9	7	6	6	5	4	4	4	5	4	5	4	4	4	4	4	4	3	4	5	5	5	5	5	4	4
Galatasaray	1	5	6	4	3	5	4	6	5	5	5	5	4	3	3	3	3	3	3	3	5	5	5	5	5	4	5	4	4	4	4	4	5	5
Gaziantepspor	6	4	3	6	6	4	7	8	8	9	9	8	9	9	8	8	8	8	7	8	9	9	9	9	8	8	8	9	9	7	8	7	8	8
Gençlerbirliği	7	13	8	12	12	9	12	13	12	14	14	16	16	13	13	15	12	11	13	13	12	11	10	10	11	13	11	12	10	12	10	12	13	14
Hacettepe Spor	15	12	9	13	14	15	14	15	15	16	17	17	17	18	17	17	18	18	18	18	18	18	18	18	18	18	18	18	18	18	18	18	18	18
İstanbul B.B.	12	15	18	16	16	16	15	12	13	12	12	11	11	12	12	10	11	13	11	10	10	12	14	15	14	15	14	16	16	16	12	11	9	9
Kayserispor	10	11	7	10	7	6	8	7	6	6	7	7	7	7	7	7	7	7	8	7	7	7	7	8	7	7	7	7	7	8	7	8	7	7
Kocaelispor	8	14	17	18	18	18	18	18	18	18	18	18	18	17	18	18	17	17	17	17	17	17	17	17	17	17	17	17	17	17	17	17	17	17
Konyaspor	4	8	10	7	9	11	9	11	11	10	10	10	12	11	11	12	13	12	12	14	13	15	13	13	15	12	13	14	14	13	16	16	16	16
Sivasspor	11	6	1	5	5	7	5	4	3	4	4	4	3	2	1	1	1	1	1	1	1	1	1	1	1	1	1	1	1	1	2	2	2	2
Trabzonspor	2	2	4	2	1	1	2	2	1	1	1	1	1	1	2	2	2	2	2	2	2	2	3	3	3	5	3	3	3	3	3	3	3	3

Source: tff.org (in Turkish)

== Results ==
Home \ Away	MKE	ANS	ANT	BEŞ	BUR	DEN	ESK	FEN	GAL	GAZ	GEN	HAC	İBB	KAY	KOC	KON	SİV	TRA
MKE Ankaragücü		1–0	0–1	1–3	1–1	3–0	3–2	0–0	0–3	3–1	0–2	1–0	0–0	1–3	4–0	1–3	0–2	1–2
Ankaraspor	0–1		0–0	1–4	0–2	2–0	2–0	1–0	0–0	0–2	0–0	4–0	1–2	2–2	4–0	3–0	2–0	0–2
Antalyaspor	1–0	1–1		2–3	2–3	2–1	0–0	1–1	1–0	1–4	4–2	1–1	1–0	2–1	0–0	0–1	2–1	0–1
Beşiktaş	1–0	1–3	1–0		0–0	1–0	2–0	1–2	2–1	3–0	3–0	2–1	2–1	1–0	5–2	2–0	1–1	1–1
Bursaspor	2–0	0–1	1–1	0–0		2–0	1–2	2–1	2–1	2–2	2–0	0–0	2–0	1–0	1–1	3–0	1–1	2–1
Denizlispor	1–1	2–0	3–2	1–2	4–3		3–2	0–1	0–2	2–0	2–2	0–0	2–1	1–0	2–1	2–1	0–2	0–1
Eskişehirspor	1–3	2–0	2–0	0–2	1–2	4–3		2–2	4–2	1–1	0–0	0–0	6–1	1–0	2–1	0–0	2–2	2–5
Fenerbahçe	1–2	2–0	2–0	2–1	5–2	1–0	2–1		4–1	1–1	3–0	7–0	2–0	1–4	1–1	4–2	4–2	0–0
Galatasaray	1–0	1–1	1–1	4–2	2–1	4–1	0–1	0–0		3–1	2–1	3–1	2–0	1–1	2–5	4–1	2–1	3–0
Gaziantepspor	2–2	2–0	1–1	0–3	2–0	2–1	1–1	1–0	0–1		2–0	0–0	1–4	0–0	5–2	0–1	2–1	3–2
Gençlerbirliği	2–0	1–1	1–2	1–3	1–2	0–0	3–1	1–0	1–3	1–0		3–1	0–0	0–4	1–1	1–0	1–2	0–1
Hacettepe Spor	0–1	3–1	1–2	2–3	1–2	1–0	2–2	2–1	2–0	0–0	0–3		2–1	0–3	0–4	1–2	1–2	1–4
İstanbul B.B.	1–2	1–2	2–1	1–1	0–1	0–2	0–0	2–0	0–1	1–1	3–1	1–0		1–0	5–0	2–0	0–3	0–4
Kayserispor	2–0	1–2	0–0	1–0	0–0	2–0	1–0	0–2	0–0	3–0	1–3	1–0	2–0		1–0	1–1	0–0	1–1
Kocaelispor	1–1	3–1	1–0	1–3	2–3	3–2	1–0	2–3	1–4	2–5	0–2	4–0	2–3	1–2		3–0	0–2	1–3
Konyaspor	3–2	3–0	2–0	0–0	0–0	1–1	1–2	1–2	0–1	2–3	2–2	2–0	1–2	0–0	2–0		0–0	2–3
Sivasspor	3–0	1–1	1–0	1–1	3–1	3–1	1–0	2–1	2–0	3–0	3–2	2–1	1–2	0–0	2–0	1–0		3–0
Trabzonspor	2–1	2–0	3–2	0–0	1–0	0–2	2–1	1–2	2–2	1–1	2–0	1–0	0–0	4–1	2–1	0–1	0–0	

Legend: Blue = home team win; Yellow = draw; Red = away team win.

== Top goalscorers ==
Source: tff.org (in Turkish)

Rank	Player	Club	Goals
1	(Czech Republic) Milan Baroš	Galatasaray	20
2	(Turkey) Taner Gülleri	Kocaelispor	18
3	(Turkey) Gökhan Ünal	Trabzonspor	15
4	(Turkey) Umut Bulut	Trabzonspor	14
4	(Turkey) Mehmet Yıldız	Sivasspor	14
6	(Guinea) Souleymane Youla	Eskişehirspor	13
7	(Brazil) Beto	Gaziantepspor	12
8	(Brazil) Alex	Fenerbahçe	11
8	(Brazil) Bobô	Beşiktaş	11
8	(Spain) Daniel Güiza	Fenerbahçe	11
8	(Brazil) Tabata	Gaziantepspor	11
8	(Turkey) Sercan Yıldırım	Bursaspor	11

=== Hat-tricks ===
Player	For	Against	Result	Date
(Nigeria) Julius Aghahowa	Kayserispor	Fenerbahçe	4–1	5 October 2008
(Turkey) Mehmet Yıldız	Sivasspor	Denizlispor	3–1	2 November 2008
(Czech Republic) Milan Baroš	Galatasaray	Hacettepe	3–1	30 November 2008
(Brazil) Rodrigo Tabata	Gaziantepspor	Kocaelispor	5–2	14 December 2008
(Czech Republic) Milan Baroš	Galatasaray	Beşiktaş	4–2	21 December 2008
(Australia) James Troisi	Gençlerbirliği	Kayserispor	3–1	24 January 2009
(Guinea) Souleymane Youla	Eskişehirspor	İstanbul BB	6–1	1 February 2009
(Brazil) Alex	Fenerbahçe	Hacettepe	7–0	14 February 2009
(Turkey) Taner Gülleri	Kocaelispor	Galatasaray	5–2	22 February 2009
(Serbia) Milan Purovic	Kayserispor	Gençlerbirliği	4–0	30 May 2009

== See also ==
- 2008–09 Türkiye Kupası
- 2008–09 TFF First League
- 2008–09 TFF Third League
