= List of Konyaspor seasons =

Konyaspor Kulübü is a professional Turkish football club based in Konya. Konyaspor was founded in 1922 with the name Konya Gençlerbirliği and has played at its current home ground, Konya Büyükşehir Stadium, ever since 2014. Konyaspor currently play in the Süper Lig the top tier of Turkish football. The club colours are green and white.

== Past seasons ==
=== Domestic results ===
Season	League	Place	G	W	D	L	GF	GA	Pts	Turkish Cup
~~"1922–65"~~ (Note: No information about results)
1965–66	TFF First League	9	20	6	4	10	30	28	22	2nd Round
1966–67	TFF First League	9	30	10	8	12	28	44	38	2nd Round
1967–68	TFF First League	11	38	13	10	15	39	55	49	-
1968–69	TFF First League	16	34	11	8	15	33	39	41	-
1969–70	TFF Second League	6	40	20	9	11	69	28	69	-
1970–71	TFF Second League	1	28	21	4	3	61	17	67	-
1971–72	TFF First League	9	30	9	10	11	21	24	37	1st Round
1972–73	TFF First League	4	30	11	9	10	24	20	42	-
1973–74	TFF First League	6	30	10	12	8	27	27	42	-
1974–75	TFF First League	13	30	9	8	13	20	32	35	-
1975–76	TFF First League	4	30	11	10	9	23	19	43	2nd Round
1976–77	TFF First League	10	30	9	9	12	20	34	36	3rd Round
1977–78	TFF First League	9	32	11	8	13	34	36	41	2nd Round
1978–79	TFF First League	16	30	5	7	18	15	49	22	3rd Round
1979–80	TFF Second League	5	18	10	5	13	32	33	35	3rd Round
1980–81	TFF First League	11	34	12	7	15	32	45	43	4th Round
1981–82	TFF First League	4	28	9	13	6	28	25	40	Last 32
1982–83	TFF First League	9	30	9	10	11	24	31	37	2nd Round
1983–84	TFF First League	8	32	11	10	11	33	34	43	2nd Round
1984–85	TFF First League	2	30	15	9	6	46	32	54	2nd Round
1985–86	TFF First League	4	32	20	3	9	54	33	63	2nd Round
1986–87	TFF First League	2	34	23	10	1	62	14	70	1st Round
1987–88	TFF First League	1	32	19	8	5	49	27	65	Last 32
1988–89	Süper Lig	8	36	14	4	18	43	59	46	Semi-Final
1989–90	Süper Lig	7	34	13	7	14	41	42	46	Last 16
1990–91	Süper Lig	12	30	10	4	16	33	45	34	Last 16
1991–92	Süper Lig	12	30	8	8	14	28	34	32	5th Round
1992–93	Süper Lig	16	30	2	10	18	29	85	16	5th Round
1993–94	TFF First League	3	33	18	6	9	62	34	60	5th Round
1994–95	TFF First League	7	32	12	9	11	40	42	45	3rd Round
1995–96	TFF First League	10	36	15	4	17	42	48	49	3rd Round
1996–97	TFF First League	3	33	14	7	12	53	36	49	2nd Round
1997–98	TFF First League	4	32	14	11	7	51	29	53	4th Round
1998–99	TFF First League	8	32	11	8	13	40	51	41	2nd Round
1999–00	TFF First League	5	38	22	7	9	63	34	73	-
2000–01	TFF First League	3	37	21	7	9	78	39	70	3rd Round
2001–02	TFF First League	5	38	20	8	10	70	45	68	2nd Round
2002–03	TFF First League	1	34	20	8	6	55	28	68	3rd Round
2003–04	Süper Lig	11	34	10	14	10	53	54	44	Quarter-finals
2004–05	Süper Lig	8	34	11	12	11	62	62	45	Quarter-finals
2005–06	Süper Lig	7	34	12	10	12	39	43	46	Group stage
2006–07	Süper Lig	9	34	12	9	13	42	44	45	Group stage
2007–08	Süper Lig	14	34	10	6	18	37	64	36	2nd Round
2008–09	Süper Lig	16	34	10	8	16	35	46	38	Group stage
2009–10	TFF First League	6	37	17	11	9	48	40	62	2nd Round
2010–11	Süper Lig	17	34	4	12	18	28	49	24	3rd Round
2011–12	TFF First League	5	36	16	11	9	35	31	59	2nd Round
2012–13	TFF First League	6	37	16	10	11	42	37	58	3rd Round
2013–14	Süper Lig	7	34	11	9	14	48	45	42	3rd Round
2014–15	Süper Lig	8	34	12	10	12	30	39	46	Last 16
2015–16	Süper Lig	3	34	19	9	6	44	33	66	Semi-Final
2016–17	Süper Lig	9	34	11	10	13	40	45	43	Winners

=== League affiliation ===
- Süper Lig: 1988–93, 2003–09, 2010–11, 2013–
- TFF First League: 1965–69, 1971–79, 1980–88, 1993–03, 2009–10, 2011–13
- TFF Second League: 1969–71, 1979–80
