= Dzhelepov =

Dzhelepov (Russian: Джелепов) is a Russian and Bulgarian patronymic surname derived from the nickname Dzhelep (Celep) of Turkic origin meaning "cattle trader". Notable people with the surname include:

- Konstantin Dzhelepov, Bulgarian fencer
- Venedikt Dzhelepov (1913–1999), Soviet physicist
