= Özgür Can Özcan =

Turkish footballer

Personal information
- Date of birth: 10 April 1988 (age 38)
- Place of birth: Manavgat, Antalya, Turkey
- Height: 1.89 m (6 ft 2 in)
- Position: Forward

Team information
- Current team: Kırklarelispor
- Number: 19

Youth career
- 1999–2002: Manavgat Belediyespor
- 2002–2006: Galatasaray

Senior career*
Years	Team	Apps	(Gls)
2004–2010	Galatasaray	3	(0)
2007	→ Kayserispor (loan)	8	(3)
2008	→ Gaziantepspor (loan)	9	(0)
2008–2009	→ Sakaryaspor (loan)	31	(17)
2009–2010	→ Çaykur Rizespor (loan)	24	(1)
2010–2011	Adanaspor	12	(1)
2011–2012	Karşıyaka	28	(4)
2012–2013	Denizlispor	3	(0)
2013–2014	Akhisar Belediyespor	1	(0)
2014	→ Tavşanlı Linyitspor (loan)	16	(6)
2014–2016	Adana Demirspor	36	(11)
2016	Boluspor	10	(0)
2016–2017	Giresunspor	33	(12)
2017–2018	Gazişehir Gaziantep	33	(12)
2018–2019	Boluspor	27	(7)
2019–2020	Giresunspor	30	(5)
2020–2021	Tuzlaspor	19	(2)
2021–2022	Şanlıurfaspor	11	(3)
2022	Tarsus İdman Yurdu	13	(0)
2022–2023	Nevşehir Belediyespor	24	(8)
2023–	Kırklarelispor	3	(0)

International career
2002	Turkey U15	2	(1)
2003–2004	Turkey U16	23	(15)
2004–2005	Turkey U17	26	(12)
2005–2006	Turkey U18	5	(2)
2006–2007	Turkey U19	10	(2)
2006–2008	Turkey U21	8	(1)
- * Club domestic league appearances and goals as of 23 September 2023

Özgür Can Özcan (born 10 April 1988) is a Turkish professional footballer who plays as a forward for TFF Second League club Kırklarelispor.

== Early career ==
Özcan was born in Antalya. He won a World fairplay award after informing the referee that he scored a goal with his hand in a match between Galatasaray and Denizlispor youth teams. The goal was cancelled and he was shown a yellow card.

== Club career ==
=== Galatasaray ===
Özcan s trained by the Galatasaray youth department and was chosen for the professional team by Gheorghe Hagi in the 2004–05 season. He never appeared in any official match squad. He made his debut in a Turkish Cup match against Mersin İdman Yurdu, on 27 October 2005. He scored a goal in the same match.

Turkish legendary striker Hakan Şükür has said, "Özgürcan is a new product of Galatasaray football academy. He is my 'crown prince'(heir apparent)". This statement raised expectations from him by the media. He has many important features as a striker (i.e.) good at jumping, heading, stamina and composure despite his young age. "

=== Kayserispor ===
Özgürcan was lent out on loan to Kayserispor in the season of 2006–07.

=== Gaziantepspor ===
Once again he is loaned to Gaziantepspor for the season of 2007–08.

=== Sakaryaspor ===
Özgürcan was loaned out Sakaryaspor during the August 2009 transfer window. He started his loan scoring 17 goals in 31 league matches.

=== Çaykur Rizespor ===
He joined fellow TFF First League club Çaykur Rizespor on loan of the season.

== Career statistics ==
As of 19 July 2010

=== Club ===
Appearances and goals by club, season and competition
Club	Season	League		Cup		League Cup		Europe		Total	
Club	Season	Apps	Goals	Apps	Goals	Apps	Goals	Apps	Goals	Apps	Goals
Galatasaray	2004–05	0	0	0	0	-		-	-	0	0
Galatasaray	2005–06	1	0	2	1	1	0	-	-	4	1
Galatasaray	2006–07	2	0	1	0	-		-	-	3	0
Galatasaray	Total	3	0	3	1	1	0	0	0	7	1
Kayserispor (loan)	2006–07	8	3	1	0	-		-	-	9	3
Gaziantepspor (loan)	2007–08	9	0	1	0	-		-		10	0
Sakaryaspor (loan)	2008–09	31	17	1	0	-		-		32	17
Çaykur Rizespor (loan)	2009–10	24	1	2	1	-		-		26	2
Adanaspor	2010–11	0	0	0	0	0	0	-		0	0
Career total		75	21	8	2	1	0	0	0	84	23
