= Rodrigo Tello =

Chilean footballer (born 1979)

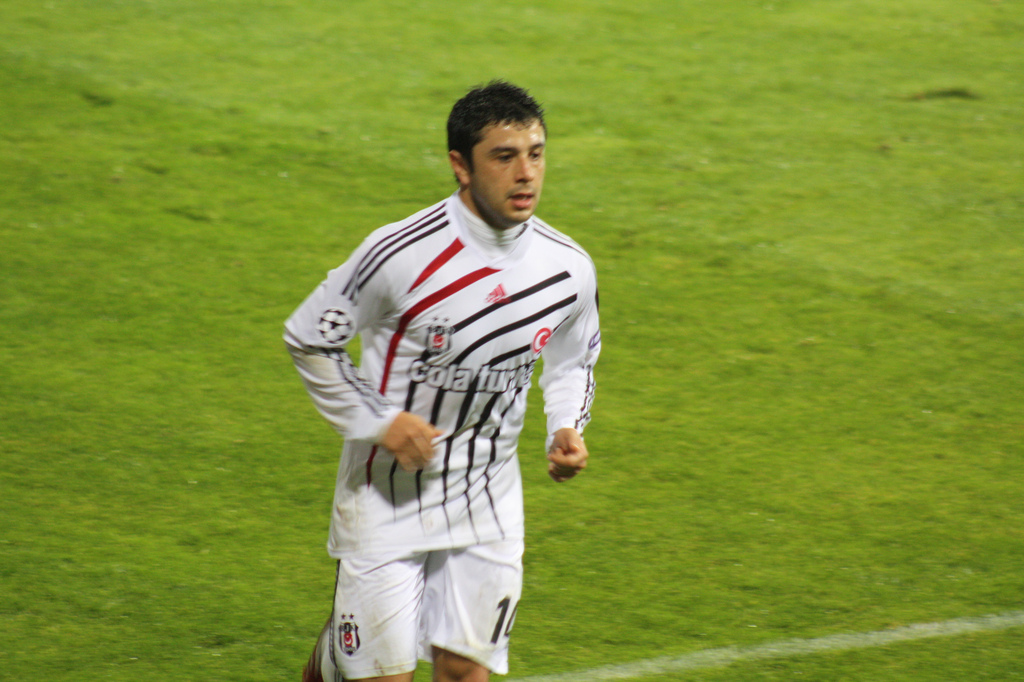
- Tello playing for Beşiktaş in 2009

Personal information
- Full name: Rodrigo Álvaro Tello Valenzuela
- Date of birth: 14 October 1979 (age 47)
- Place of birth: Santiago, Chile
- Height: 1.70 m (5 ft 7 in)
- Position: Midfielder

Youth career
- 1992–1995: Colo-Colo
- 1995–1999: Universidad de Chile

Senior career*
Years	Team	Apps	(Gls)
1999–2000	Universidad de Chile	53	(7)
2001–2007	Sporting CP	113	(8)
2007–2010	Beşiktaş	87	(15)
2010–2014	Eskişehirspor	79	(3)
2014	Elazığspor	14	(2)
2014–2015	Şanlıurfaspor	29	(2)
2015–2016	Audax Italiano	10	(0)
Total		385	(37)

International career
2000	Chile U23	5	(1)
2000–2010	Chile	36	(3)
Medal record
Representing Chile
Men's Football
Bronze medal – third place	2000 Sydney	Team competition
- * Club domestic league appearances and goals

Rodrigo Álvaro Tello Valenzuela (born 14 October 1979) is a Chilean former professional footballer. He operated mainly as a left midfielder, but could also appear in the middle and as an attacking left back.

He spent the better part of his early professional career in Portugal with Sporting, where he arrived at only 21. In 2007, he moved to Turkey where he remained several years, notably representing Beşiktaş and Eskişehirspor.

A Chilean international for a full decade, Tello represented the country at the Olympic Bronze Medalist in Sydney 2000, 2010 World Cup and the 2007 Copa América, He is currently a player representative at RC Sports Management.

== Club career ==
Born in Santiago, as a child Tello was with Colo-Colo from 1992 to 1995. Next he moved to Club Universidad de Chile and began his career making his professional debuts in 1999. He quickly made a good impression, being named the best midfielder in the country in 2000 and being transferred to Sporting Clube de Portugal for a fee of €7 million in January of the following year, alongside compatriot Mario Cáceres; at the time, it was a club record for the Primeira Liga side.

After a slow start, Tello eventually became an important first-team member – although he would be used mainly as a substitute – and even saw some time at left back.

In the 2007 summer, Tello moved to Turkey and signed with Beşiktaş, being named to the Team of the Season in his second year as his team won the double. On 25 November 2009, during a UEFA Champions League group stage game against Manchester United, he scored from 25 yards to beat Ben Foster and help to a 1–0 win, the first match in that stage of the competition the English had lost at Old Trafford in eight years.

On 25 July 2010, aged 30, Tello left Beşiktaş but continued in the Süper Lig, signing a three-year contract with Eskişehirspor. In January 2014, he moved to fellow league club Elazığspor, transferring to Şanlıurfaspor of the second division in June.

Tello returned to his country after a 15-year absence, agreeing to a one-year deal at Audax Italiano on 4 August 2015. On 28 April of the following year, the 36-year-old announced his retirement.

== International career ==
A full Chilean international since his early 20s, Tello represented the country at the 2007 Copa América, where the national side exited in the last-eight after a 6–1 loss against eventual winners Brazil, and at the 2010 FIFA World Cup in South Africa, playing in the second half of the round-of-16 3–0 defeat to the same opponents.

He also competed at the 2000 Summer Olympics, winning a bronze medal.

== Career statistics ==
=== Club ===
Appearances and goals by club, season and competition
Club	Season	League		Cup		Other		Europe		Total	
Club	Season	Apps	Goals	Apps	Goals	Apps	Goals	Apps	Goals	Apps	Goals
Sporting CP	2003–04	3	0	0	0	0	0	2	0	5	0
Sporting CP	2004–05	9	1	0	0	0	0	6	0	15	1
Sporting CP	2005–06	20	1	0	0	0	0	3	0	23	1
Sporting CP	2006–07	24	2	0	0	0	0	6	0	30	2
Sporting CP	Total	56	4	0	0	0	0	17	0	73	4
Beşiktaş	2007–08	29	5	0	0	1	0	8	1	38	6
Beşiktaş	2008–09	32	6	8	1	0	0	4	1	44	8
Beşiktaş	2009–10	26	4	4	0	1	0	6	1	37	5
Beşiktaş	Total	87	15	12	1	2	0	18	3	119	19
Eskişehirspor	2010–11	16	0	1	0	0	0	0	0	17	0
Eskişehirspor	2011–12	33	1	3	0	0	0	0	0	36	1
Eskişehirspor	2012–13	27	2	5	1	0	0	3	0	35	3
Eskişehirspor	2013–14	3	0	3	1	0	0	0	0	6	1
Eskişehirspor	Total	79	3	12	2	0	0	3	0	94	5
Elazığspor	2013–14	14	2	1	0	0	0	0	0	15	2
Şanlıurfaspor	2014–15	29	2	0	0	0	0	0	0	29	2
Audax Italiano	2015–16	10	0	3	1	0	0	0	0	13	1
Career total		275	26	28	4	2	0	38	3	343	33

=== International ===
Scores and results list Chile's goal tally first, score column indicates score after each Tello goal.

List of international goals scored by Rodrigo Tello
No.	Date	Venue	Opponent	Score	Result	Competition
1	23 September 2000	Estadio Nacional, Santiago, Chile	Honduras	1–0	5–2	Friendly
2	29 March 2000	Monumental, Buenos Aires, Argentina	Argentina	1–1	1–4	2002 World Cup qualification
3	30 May 2010	Estadio Municipal, Concepción, Chile	Israel	3–0	3–0	Friendly

== Honours ==
Universidad de Chile

- Chilean Primera División: 1999, 2000
- Copa Chile: 2000

Sporting CP

- Primeira Liga: 2001–02
- Taça de Portugal: 2001–02, 2006–07
- Supertaça Cândido de Oliveira: 2000, 2002
- UEFA Cup runner-up: 2004–05

Beşiktaş

- Süper Lig: 2008–09
- Turkish Cup: 2008–09

Chile U23

- Summer Olympic Games bronze: 2000

Chile

- Copa Ciudad de Valparaíso: 2000
