= Bülent Uygun =

Turkish footballer and manager

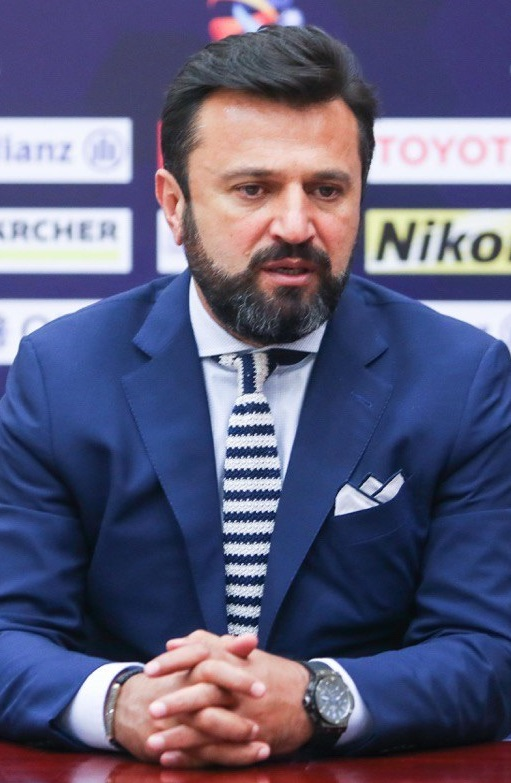

Personal information
- Date of birth: 1 August 1971 (age 55)
- Place of birth: Sakarya, Turkey
- Height: 1.78 m (5 ft 10 in)
- Positions: Attacking midfielder; forward

Youth career
- 1985–1989: Sakaryaspor

Senior career*
Years	Team	Apps	(Gls)
1989–1993	Kocaelispor	34	(15)
1993–1996	Fenerbahçe	107	(39)
1996–1998	Kocaelispor	19	(13)
1998–1999	Çanakkale Dardanelspor	28	(9)
1999–2000	Trabzonspor	16	(10)
2000–2001	Göztepe	11	(5)
2001–2002	Sivasspor	20	(9)
2002–2004	Üsküdar Anadolu	24	(16)
Total		256	(116)

International career
1992–1996	Turkey	18	(7)

Managerial career
- 2005–2009: Sivasspor
- 2010: Bucaspor
- 2010–2011: Eskişehirspor
- 2012: Elazığspor
- 2013: Gaziantepspor
- 2013–2016: Umm Salal
- 2017: Osmanlispor
- 2017–2018: Al-Gharafa
- 2018–2019: Al-Rayyan
- 2019: Kayserispor
- 2020: Denizlispor
- 2021: Çaykur Rizespor
- 2024: Sivasspor
- * Club domestic league appearances and goals

Bülent Uygun (born 1 August 1971) is a Turkish football manager and former player. He played as an attacking midfielder after starting his career as a striker, and was the captain of Fenerbahçe. His nickname is The Soldier.

== Playing career ==
He began his career with Sakaryaspor at youth level, and went on to sign professionally for Kocaelispor in 1989. After four years, he then moved to Istanbul, playing three years with Turkish giants Fenerbahçe, scoring 39 goals in 107 matches. During the 1993–94 season he was Fenerbahçe's top scorer with 22 goals. He then moved back to his former club Kocaelispor in 1996. He has short spells with other clubs including Trabzonspor, Anadolu Üsküdar 1908 and Sivasspor. He was famous for celebrating his goals by giving a soldier's salute. He was capped 16 times for the Turkey Under-21 squad and 11 times for Turkey, scoring only twice for the senior squad. He also played 3 times for the National Olympic Team.

== Managerial career ==
=== Sivasspor ===
Bülent took the job as manager of Sivasspor in 2006, with the club having just completed their first ever season in the top flight, after promotion from Turkey’s second tier in May 2005. The club, based in Central Anatolia, have a small stadium with a capacity of just 18,000 people. At the age of 35, this was Bülent's first ever managerial role, having retired from playing professional football two years earlier.

==== 2006–07 season ====
In 2006–07, Bülent's first season in charge, he led them to an over-achieving 7th-place finish, finishing on 48 points. He also led Sivas to the group stage of the Turkish Domestic Cup, also known as the Fortis Cup.

==== 2007–08 season ====
The 2007–08, season saw Sivas lead the table until January 2008, having amassed a fantastic home record. The first half of the season saw them play 10 home games, winning all 10, scoring 20 goals and conceding only three. British press had picked up on this 'surprise team' with many wondering if they will be able to break the stronghold of the dominant 'Istanbul Big Three', Galatasaray, Fenerbahçe and Beşiktaş, and become only the fifth club to win the league. However, the second half of the season saw them drop points and they finished in a 'disappointing' 4th place, with 73 points. Through their league position, the qualified for the 2nd Round of the, now defunct, UEFA Intertoto Cup; the first time in the club's history that they participated in a European Competition. They progressed to third round but missed the chance to play in the UEFA Cup, after losing to eventual Intertoto Cup winners Braga of Portugal. Uygun was named Süper Lig manager of the season in May 2008 at the age of 36.

==== 2008–09 season ====
The 'Sivas Fairytale' continued to grow in the 2008–09 season when they led at the top of the table for the majority of the season. It was thought that Sivasspor would be the first team in 25 years to win the league, outside of the 'Istanbul Big Three', when Trabzonspor won at the end of the 1983–84 season. However, late April 2009 saw Beşiktaş overtake them to the top spot, and eventually they had to settle for second place, coming in five points behind Beşiktaş. They qualified for the Champions League entering the third round as the best-placed path for non-champions, and were drawn against Anderlecht of Belgium. Uygun relishes the fact that minnows Sivasspor, with a budget of just $12 million, will be playing in the Champions League this coming season.

Sivasspor's continued success in the 2008–09 season, saw UEFA study the team, along with José Mourinho and experts from the Netherlands and Brazil analyzing the team and also Uygun's methods.

==== 2009–10 season ====
After having lost seven players from their first 11 during the summer 2009 transfer window, Sivasspor began the pre-season slowly. While away at their Netherlands training camp, they lost three of their five pre-season friendly's managing only one win and a draw.

For the first time in Sivas's 42-year history, the 2009–10 season saw Sivasspor take part in the Champions League and the Europa League, formerly the UEFA Cup. They were drawn in the Champions League third qualifying round against Anderlecht, and on their debut match on 29 July 2009, lost 5–0 away to the Belgian side. However, the second leg saw Sivas's first Champions League win after the Turkish side won 3–1 at home, and gave Bulent Uygun his first competitive win for the 09–10 season, although they lost 6–3 on aggregate and did not progress to the next stage.

Having been eliminated at the third round, Sivas were drawn to face UEFA Cup holders Shakhtar Donetsk in the Europa League play-off round, however they lost both legs and were thus eliminated from all European competitions.

Sivas' poor start to the season saw them second from bottom of the Süper Lig with just one point from seven games. Their first victory of the season came on matchday 8 against Antalyaspor, in a 1–0 home win. However, shortly after this match on 4 October 2009, Uygun announced he was stepping down as manager, believing he had taken the club as far as he could.

=== Umm Salal SC ===
On 15 December 2013, Bülent was appointed new head coach of Umm Salal SC in Qatar Stars League.

== Management style ==
Bülent has stated that his managerial influence has come from Brazilian 1994 World Cup manager Carlos Alberto Parreira, whom he worked under while playing for Fenerbahçe S.K. In a 2009 interview, Uygun is quoted as saying:

“My father was a wrestling coach. He told me that my career as a soccer player would end in 15 years. He advised me to think like a coach at all times. So when I was a player, I always looked at the game with the eyes of a coach. I took the good bits from Parreira, Osieck, Fatih Terim and all of the other coaches with whom I had worked. I viewed every training session as an experiment. After I quit playing, I watched more than 100 matches in Europe. I attended the training courses and read the best books about it. And I developed my own system, which I call "TürBülent"”

The computer program he devised called "TürBülent", is a training system sees players alternate between performance-enhancing fitness binges and prolonged rests, the idea being that form-sapping fatigue can be meticulously scheduled against breaks in the fixture calendar.

He is known to be very strict with his players, and has previously spoken of banning his players from drinking alcohol and partying at nightclubs. He credits some of Sivasspor's success to this.

== Managerial statistics ==
As of 14 March 2015

Nation	Team	From	To	Record				
Nation	Team	From	To	Pld	W	D	L	Win%
(Turkey)	Sivasspor	June 2006	October 2009	132	64	25	43	48.48
(Turkey)	Bucaspor	December 2009	March 2010	7	1	3	3	14.29
(Turkey)	Eskişehirspor	July 2010	January 2011	27	12	8	7	44.44
(Turkey)	Elazığspor	November 2011	May 2012	14	3	5	6	21.43
(Turkey)	Gaziantepspor	November 2012	February 2013	26	11	6	9	42.31
(Qatar)	Umm Salal	December 2013	December 2016	53	23	17	13	43.40
Total				225	102	52	71	45.33

== See also ==
- 2011 Turkish football match-fixing scandal
