= Fredrik Risp =

Swedish footballer

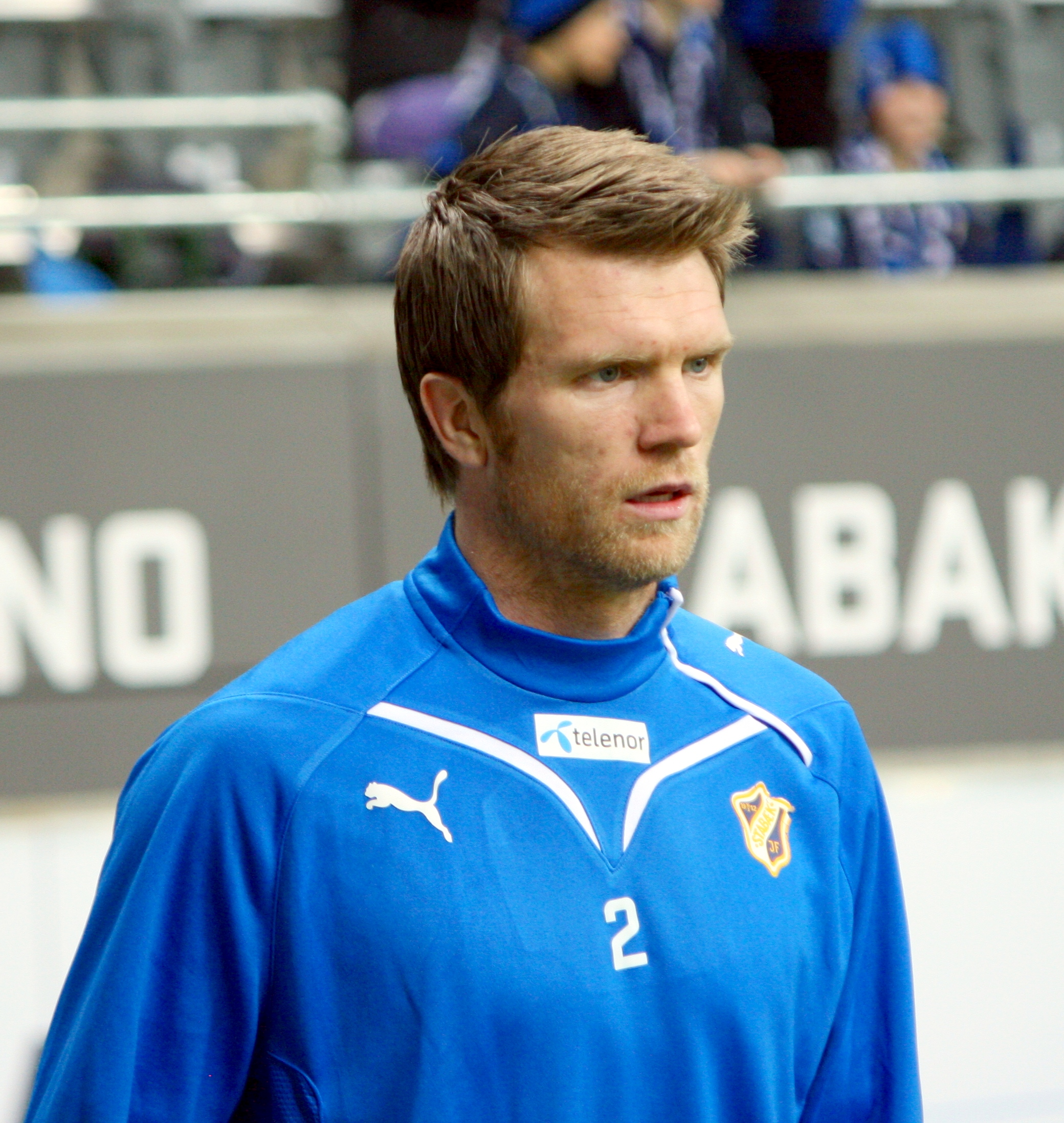

Personal information
- Full name: Lars Fredrik Risp
- Date of birth: 15 December 1980 (age 45)
- Place of birth: Lysekil, Sweden
- Height: 1.86 m (6 ft 1 in)
- Position: Central defender

Youth career
- Lysekils FF

Senior career*
Years	Team	Apps	(Gls)
1996–1998	Lysekils FF	47	(8)
1999–2005	IFK Göteborg	107	(4)
2003	→ Chievo (loan)	0	(0)
2005–2007	Gençlerbirliği	45	(0)
2007–2008	Trabzonspor	6	(0)
2008–2009	Ankaraspor	15	(0)
2009	→ Stabæk (loan)	8	(0)
2009–2010	Ankaragücü	4	(0)
2010	IFK Göteborg	3	(0)
2010–2011	Esbjerg	22	(0)
2011–2012	Levski Sofia	3	(0)
2012–2013	Ethnikos Achna	19	(0)
Total		279	(12)

International career
2000–2001	Sweden U21	15	(0)
2001–2005	Sweden	3	(0)
- * Club domestic league appearances and goals as of 24 August 2013

Lars Fredrik Risp (born 15 December 1980) is a Swedish former professional footballer who played as a defender. He played professionally in Sweden, Italy, Turkey, Norway, Denmark, Bulgaria and Cyprus in a career that spanned between 1996 and 2013. A full international between 2001 and 2005, he won three caps for the Sweden national team.

== Biography ==
As a native of Lysekil, he started his football career in Lysekils FF.

=== IFK Göteborg ===
In 1999, he moved to IFK Göteborg. After spending very short time with Chievo on a loan deal in 2003, he went back to IFK Goteborg.

=== Turkey ===
After two years in 2005, he was transferred by Gençlerbirliği. During the transfer window in January 2007, he moved to Trabzonspor, together with Ayman Abdelaziz. He signed a 2/5-year contract with Ankaraspor in January 2008. In February 2009, he went to the Norwegian club Stabæk on loan. After the loan period, he went back to Turkey and signed a one-year contract with Ankaragucu in August 2009.

=== Levski Sofia ===
Risp signed with Bulgarian club Levski Sofia during the summer of 2011, after playing in a friendly match for the club.

He ended his playing career following the 2012/13 season with the Cypriot club Ethnikos Achna at the age of 32.

== Career statistics ==
=== Club ===
Club	Season	League			Cup		Europe		Total	
Club	Season	Division	Apps	Goals	Apps	Goals	Apps	Goals	Apps	Goals
Lysekils FF	1996		15	2	0	0	0	0	15	2
Lysekils FF	1997		22	4	0	0	0	0	22	4
Lysekils FF	1998		10	2	0	0	0	0	10	2
IFK Göteborg	2000	Allsvenskan	15	0	0	0	0	0	15	0
IFK Göteborg	2001	Allsvenskan	25	0	0	0	0	0	25	0
IFK Göteborg	2002	Allsvenskan	22	1	0	0	0	0	22	1
IFK Göteborg	2003	Allsvenskan	9	1	0	0	0	0	9	1
IFK Göteborg	2004	Allsvenskan	25	0	0	0	0	0	25	0
IFK Göteborg	2005	Allsvenskan	11	2	0	0	0	0	11	2
Gençlerbirliği	2005/06	Süper Lig	28	0	0	0	0	0	28	0
Gençlerbirliği	2006/07	Süper Lig	17	0	0	0	0	0	17	0
Trabzonspor	2006/07	Süper Lig	5	0	0	0	0	0	5	0
Trabzonspor	2007/08	Süper Lig	1	0	0	0	0	0	1	0
Ankaraspor	2007/08	Süper Lig	12	0	0	0	0	0	12	0
Ankaraspor	2008/09	Süper Lig	3	0	2	0	0	0	5	0
Stabæk	2009	Tippeligaen	8	0	0	0	0	0	8	0
Ankaragücü	2009/10	Süper Lig	4	0	0	0	0	0	4	0
IFK Göteborg	2010	Allsvenskan	3	0	0	0	0	0	3	0
Esbjerg	2010/11	Danish Superliga	22	0	3	0	0	0	25	0
Levski Sofia	2011/12	Bulgarian First League	3	0	0	0	2	0	5	0
Ethnikos Achna	2011/12	Cypriot First Division	6	0	4	0	0	0	10	0
Ethnikos Achna	2012/13	Cypriot First Division	13	0	0	0	0	0	13	0
Career totals			276	12	9	0	2	0	287	12

=== International ===
Appearances and goals by national team and year
National team	Year	Apps	Goals
Sweden	2001	1	0
Sweden	2002	0	0
Sweden	2003	0	0
Sweden	2004	0	0
Sweden	2005	2	0
Total		3	0

== Honours ==
Stabæk

- Superfinalen: 2009
