= 2008–09 TFF 1. Lig =

7th season of TFF 1. Lig

1. Lig
- Season: 2008–09
- Champions: Manisaspor
- Promoted: Manisaspor, Diyarbakırspor, Kasımpaşa
- Relegated: Sakaryaspor, Güngören, Malatyaspor
- Matches played: 306
- Goals scored: 752 (2.46 per match)
- Top goalscorer: Bruno Mezenga (21)
- Biggest home win: Ordu 5–0 Güngören
- Biggest away win: Karabük 0–6 Kasımpaşa
- Highest scoring: Karabük 6–3 Manisa

The 2008–09 TFF 1. Lig (referred to as the Bank Asya 1. Lig for sponsorship reasons) was the second-level football league of Turkey and the 46th season since its establishment in 1963–64. At the end of the season in which 18 teams competed in a single group, Manisaspor and Diyarbakırspor, which finished the league in the first two places, and the play-off winner Kasımpaşa were promoted to the upper league, while Sakaryaspor, Güngören Belediyespor and Malatyaspor, which were in the last three places, were relegated.

== Teams ==
=== Team summaries ===
Location of teams in TFF 1. Lig 2008–09

=== Foreign players ===
Club	Player 1	Player 2	Former players
Adanaspor	(Cameroon) Marc Mbamba	(Cameroon) Mbilla Etame	–
Altay	(Argentina) Emanuel Molina	(Brazil) Tiago Bezerra	–
Boluspor	–	–	–
Çaykur Rizespor	(Brazil) Elionar Bombinha	(Croatia) Igor Gal	–
Diyarbakırspor	–	–	–
Gaziantep B.B.	(Brazil) Tiago Azulão	–	(Brazil) Fumaça
Giresunspor	(Bosnia and Herzegovina) Edin Ademović	(Kyrgyzstan) Anton Zemlyanukhin	(Guinea) Ibrahima Cissé
Güngören Belediyespor	–	–	–
Kardemir Karabükspor	–	–	–
Kartalspor	(Benin) Christian Kotchoni	–	(Senegal) Abdoulaye Diakate
Karşıyaka	–	–	(Senegal) Seni Camara
Kasımpaşa	(Brazil) André Moritz	(Denmark) Jens Askou	(Cameroon) Joseph Mawaye
Kayseri Erciyesspor	(Cameroon) Severin Bikoko	(Kazakhstan) Ali Aliyev	–
Malatyaspor	–	–	–
Manisaspor	(France) Stéphane Borbiconi	(Guinea) Oumar Kalabane	–
Orduspor	(Brazil) Bruno Mezenga	(Ghana) Jerry Akaminko	–
Sakaryaspor	(Colombia) Neco Martínez	(Senegal) Abdoulaye Diakate	–
Samsunspor	–	–	–

== Standings ==
Pos	Team	Pld	W	D	L	GF	GA	GD	Pts	Qualification or relegation
1	Manisaspor (C, P)	34	17	13	4	64	37	+27	64	Promotion to Süper Lig
2	Diyarbakırspor (P)	34	18	8	8	39	27	+12	62	Promotion to Süper Lig
3	Boluspor	34	16	8	10	49	35	+14	56	Qualification for promotion playoffs
4	Kasımpaşa (O, P)	34	15	10	9	45	27	+18	55 (Note: Head-to-head record: Kasımpaşa 2–0 Altay, Altay 1–0 Kasımpaşa (Kasımpaşa ahead))	Qualification for promotion playoffs
5	Altay	34	13	16	5	50	39	+11	55	Qualification for promotion playoffs
6	Karşıyaka	34	13	12	9	35	29	+6	51	Qualification for promotion playoffs
7	Kardemir Karabükspor	34	12	13	9	51	48	+3	49	
8	Adanaspor	34	13	9	12	38	38	0	48	
9	Çaykur Rizespor	34	13	8	13	39	44	−5	47	
10	Orduspor	34	13	6	15	48	44	+4	45	
11	Kayseri Erciyesspor	34	10	11	13	45	43	+2	41 (Note: Head-to-head record: Kayseri Erciyesspor 1–1 Kartalspor, Kartalspor 1–1 Kayseri Erciyesspor (Equal, overall goal difference))	
12	Kartalspor	34	10	11	13	33	37	−4	41	
13	Gaziantep B.B.	34	10	10	14	35	40	−5	40 (Note: Head-to-head record: Gaziantep B.B. 0–1 Giresunspor, Giresunspor 0–2 Gaziantep B.B. (Gaziantep B.B. ahead))	
14	Giresunspor	34	12	4	18	35	48	−13	40	
15	Samsunspor	34	11	6	17	35	47	−12	39 (Note: Head-to-head record: Samsunspor 3–1 Sakaryaspor, Sakaryaspor 1–0 Samsunspor (Samsunspor ahead))	
16	Sakaryaspor (R)	34	11	6	17	44	50	−6	39	Relegation to TFF Second League
17	Güngören Belediyespor (R)	34	10	6	18	35	56	−21	36	Relegation to TFF Second League
18	Malatyaspor (R)	34	8	5	21	32	63	−31	29	Relegation to TFF Second League

Source: TFF
Rules for classification: 1) points; 2) goal difference; 3) number of goals scored.
(C) Champions; (O) Play-off winners; (P) Promoted; (R) Relegated

== Results ==
Home \ Away	ADA	ALT	BOL	ÇYR	DYB	GBB	GRS	GÜN	KRB	KRT	KSK	KAS	KER	MAL	MAN	ORD	SAK	SAM
Adanaspor		1–1	2–0	0–2	2–1	1–2	2–1	1–2	3–2	3–1	1–1	1–3	3–2	2–0	1–1	1–1	1–0	1–0
Altay	1–0		1–1	1–2	0–0	2–2	1–1	3–2	1–1	3–2	3–0	1–0	1–3	4–1	1–1	2–1	3–2	1–2
Boluspor	2–0	0–0		2–0	2–0	1–0	2–1	3–1	0–2	0–0	0–3	0–0	2–0	4–1	0–2	2–0	2–2	3–1
Çaykur Rizespor	0–0	1–1	1–4		0–1	2–2	4–2	3–2	2–2	0–3	2–1	0–0	4–0	0–1	0–2	1–0	2–1	2–0
Diyarbakırspor	1–0	4–1	1–1	1–2		2–0	1–0	3–2	2–1	2–0	2–0	0–0	1–0	1–0	1–1	1–0	1–0	2–1
Gaziantep B.B.	1–2	0–0	0–0	1–1	1–2		0–1	3–0	1–1	0–1	1–0	0–2	0–2	2–0	1–2	1–4	2–0	2–0
Giresunspor	0–0	2–3	1–0	1–0	1–2	0–2		1–0	2–3	1–0	1–1	0–1	1–0	2–0	1–6	2–3	0–3	1–0
Güngören Belediyespor	0–1	1–1	2–4	2–1	1–0	1–1	1–0		0–2	0–0	2–2	2–1	1–0	0–1	0–0	3–1	3–1	0–0
Kardemir Karabükspor	2–1	0–1	0–2	1–1	2–2	2–0	1–0	0–2		3–0	0–0	0–6	2–2	3–0	6–3	2–2	3–1	1–1
Kartalspor	3–0	0–0	0–1	2–1	0–0	2–2	2–0	3–0	1–3		1–0	1–3	1–1	2–0	0–1	1–1	0–0	2–1
Karşıyaka	1–0	0–0	3–2	1–0	0–1	0–0	1–1	4–1	2–1	2–0		1–0	0–0	1–0	1–1	1–0	2–0	0–0
Kasımpaşa	1–0	2–0	1–0	4–0	4–1	2–0	0–2	0–2	0–0	0–0	1–1		1–1	1–1	0–0	1–3	0–1	2–1
Kayseri Erciyesspor	1–1	1–1	3–3	2–0	2–1	3–1	1–3	1–0	0–1	1–1	0–1	1–2		5–1	4–0	2–0	1–1	0–0
Malatyaspor	1–2	2–2	2–0	1–2	0–0	1–2	0–1	2–1	0–0	1–0	0–1	0–0	2–3		0–4	4–2	1–3	4–3
Manisaspor	3–2	0–1	3–1	1–1	1–1	0–0	3–1	1–0	5–1	1–1	2–2	3–2	1–1	4–1		3–1	2–2	3–0
Orduspor	0–2	1–1	1–0	2–0	0–1	1–0	4–0	5–0	1–1	1–0	1–0	1–2	2–1	4–2	1–2		1–1	2–1
Sakaryaspor	0–0	3–4	0–1	0–1	0–1	2–4	1–0	4–1	3–1	1–3	3–1	1–2	2–0	0–2	1–2	2–1		1–0
Samsunspor	1–1	0–4	1–4	0–1	1–0	0–1	0–4	3–0	1–1	4–0	2–1	2–1	2–1	2–0	1–0	1–0	3–1	

Legend: Blue = home team win; Yellow = draw; Red = away team win.

== Promotion play-offs ==
The Promotion play-offs will be played in Yenikent Asaş Stadium in Ankara. The Semi-final matches will take place on 15 May. The League's third-placed team will play the sixth-placed team and the fourth-placed team will play the fifth-placed team. The winners of these matches will play on 17 May in the final match. The winner of this match will play in Süper Lig in the 2009–2010 season.

Semi-finals
15 May 2009, 16:00
Karşıyaka	0 (2)
Boluspor	2 (3)
15 May 2009, 20:30
Kasımpaşa	1 (5)
Altay	1 (3)

Final
17 May 2009, 20:30
Karşıyaka	1
Kasımpaşa	2

== Top goalscorers ==
Rank	Player	Club	Goals
1	(Brazil) Bruno Mezenga	Orduspor	21
2	(Turkey) Özgür Can Özcan	Sakaryaspor	17
3	(Turkey) Emrah Bozkurt	Diyarbakırspor	16
4	(Turkey) Edim Demir	Boluspor	14
4	(Turkey) Sezer Öztürk	Vestel Manisaspor	14
6	(Turkey) Aydın Çetin	Giresunspor	13
7	(Turkey) Burak Çalık	Altay	12
7	(Turkey) Erhan Küçük	Kasımpaşa	12
7	(Brazil) Rafael Mariano	Vestel Manisaspor	12
10	(Turkey) Burhan Coşkun	Samsunspor	11
10	(Brazil) Nascimento Ribeiro	Çaykur Rizespor	11
