= Celep =

Celep is a Turkish occupational surname literally meaning "cattle trader". Notable people with the surname include:

- Caner Celep, Turkish footballer
- Elif Celep, Turkish rhythmic gymnast
- Mert Celep (born 1955), Turkish basketbal player

== See also ==
- Andriy Dzhelep (born 2000) Ukrainian freestyle wrestler
