= Daniel Addo (footballer, born 1987) =

Ghanaian football defensive midfielder

Personal information
- Full name: Daniel Addo
- Date of birth: March 6, 1987 (age 39)
- Place of birth: Accra, Ghana
- Height: 1.88 m (6 ft 2 in)
- Positions: Defensive midfielder; forward

Youth career
- –2005: Young Kotoko/Black Tigers

Senior career*
Years	Team	Apps	(Gls)
2006–2007	Okwahu United		
2007–2008	Hearts of Oak		
2008–2009	Gençlerbirliği	19	(1)
2009	→ Hacettepespor	7	(1)
2010–2012	Hapoel Petah Tikva	65	(1)
2013–2014	Hapoel Ramat Gan	9	(0)
- * Club domestic league appearances and goals as of 13 January 2014

Daniel Addo (born 6 March 1987) is a Ghanaian football defensive midfielder. He previously played for clubs like Gençlerbirliği S.K., Hacettepespor and Hapoel Petah Tikva.

== Club career ==
Addo began his professional career at Kessben F.C., moving in July 2014 to Accra Hearts of Oak SC. After just six months in Accra, he left the team and was transferred to Gençlerbirliği S.K., he joining also with his former Kessben teammate James Boadu to Turkey. In June 2009 left Gençlerbirliği S.K. and joined on loan to Hacettepespor the deal runs between 30 June 2010. He moved to Israel and signed for Hapoel Petah Tikva in January 2010.

== International career ==
On November 13, 2007, Addo was first called to Ghana's national side, making the squad-of-23 for the match against Nigeria, being subsequently picked for the 40-man training camp for the 2008 African Cup of Nations.
