= Carlos Alberto (footballer, born 1980) =

Brazilian footballer

Personal information
- Full name: Carlos Alberto dos Santos Gomes
- Date of birth: 22 October 1980 (age 46)
- Place of birth: Boquim, Brazil
- Height: 1.73 m (5 ft 8 in)
- Position: Left-back

Senior career*
Years	Team	Apps	(Gls)
2005–2006	Paysandu		
2007	Tigres do Brasil		
2007–2009	Denizlispor	100	(2)
2009	Criciúma		
2010	Boavista-RJ		
2010	Tupi	4	(0)
2010–2011	Vila Nova	10	(0)
2011	América-RJ		
2011	Americano		
2011	Anápolis		
2012	Macaé		
2012	Küçük Kaymaklı		
2013–?	Boavista-RJ		
- * Club domestic league appearances and goals

Carlos Alberto dos Santos Gomes (born 22 October 1980) is a Brazilian former professional footballer who played as a left-back.
