= Elionar Bombinha =

Brazilian footballer (born 1982)

Personal information
- Full name: Elionar Nascimento Ribeiro
- Date of birth: June 10, 1982 (age 44)
- Place of birth: Sorriso, Mato Grosso, Brazil
- Height: 1.84 m (6 ft 0 in)
- Position: Forward

Team information
- Current team: Cuiabá

Senior career*
Years	Team	Apps	(Gls)
2003	Sorriso		
2004	Luverdense		
2005	Francisco Beltrão		
2006	Marília		
2006	Mineiros		
2007	Ituano		
2007–2010	Çaykur Rizespor	94	(24)
2011	São Bernardo	11	(4)
2011–2013	ABC	21	(9)
2011	→ Incheon United (loan)	6	(1)
2012	→ Comercial-SP (loan)	14	(5)
2013	ASA	18	(7)
2014	São Bernardo	6	(1)
2014	Cuiabá	7	(2)
2015	Aparecidense	14	(3)
2015	Operário Ferroviário	3	(0)
2016	Rio Preto	13	(2)
- * Club domestic league appearances and goals

Elionar Nascimento Ribeiro (born June 10, 1982), known as Elionar Bombinha, is a Brazilian former professional footballer who played as a forward.

Elionar joined Süper Lig side Çaykur Rizespor in July 2007 and played for three seasons, making 94 appearances with 24 goals. In July 2011, he moved to South Korean club Incheon United in forward position, on loan from ABC Futebol Clube.
