= Caner Celep =

Turkish footballer

Personal information
- Date of birth: 21 July 1984 (age 42)
- Place of birth: Istanbul, Turkey
- Height: 1.84 m (6 ft 0 in)
- Position: Midfielder

Youth career
- –2000: Kartalspor

Senior career*
Years	Team	Apps	(Gls)
2000–2002	Kartalspor		
2002–2004	İstanbulspor	1	(0)
2003–2004	→ Eyüpspor (loan)		
2004–2005	Maltepespor		
2005–2007	Boluspor		
2007–2010	Denizlispor	51	(3)
2010–2011	Eskişehirspor	3	(0)
2011	Kartalspor	7	(0)
2011–2012	Turgutluspor	8	(1)
2012	Körfez	7	(0)
2012–2014	Tepecikspor	23	(2)
- * Club domestic league appearances and goals

Caner Celep (born 21 July 1984) is a Turkish former football midfielder.
