= James Boadu =

Ghanaian footballer

Personal information
- Full name: James Kwaku Boadu
- Date of birth: January 24, 1986 (age 40)
- Place of birth: Tafo, Ghana
- Height: 1.83 m (6 ft 0 in)
- Positions: Forward; second striker

Team information
- Current team: New Edubiase United

Senior career*
Years	Team	Apps	(Gls)
2007	Kessben		
2008	Gençlerbirliği Oftaş	3	(0)
2008–2009	KS Vllaznia Shkodër	31	(3)
2009–2010	Kessben		
2010–2012	Medeama SC		
2012–2013	Berekum Arsenal		
2013–	New Edubiase United		
- * Club domestic league appearances and goals

James Kwaku Boadu (born January 24, 1985, in Tafo) is a Ghanaian footballer who currently plays for New Edubiase United.

== Career ==
He is a young striker and has represented Ghana at youth level. He previously played for Berekum Arsenal before he moved to Kessben F.C. in 2007, at youth level he played for Champions FC. In summer of 2008 he transferred to the Turkish club, Gençlerbirliği S.K. After playing last season with Hacettepe Spor Kulübü on loan from Gençlerbirliği S.K.

=== KS Vllaznia ===
It was reported that Boadu will return to Turkey and play for Genclerbirligi or Trabzonspor, who showed a lot of interest in the players services, but Boadu was happy to stay in Albania and keep playing on for Vllaznia.

=== Ghana ===
Boadu turned in summer 2009 back to his former club Kessben F.C., who scored in his debut game on 19 October 2009 against King Faisal Babes the second goal.
