= Tomáš Abrahám =

Czech footballer

Personal information
- Date of birth: 18 April 1979 (age 47)
- Place of birth: Třebíč, Czechoslovakia
- Height: 1.79 m (5 ft 10 1/2 in)
- Position: Defensive midfielder

Team information
- Current team: Wacker Innsbruck
- Number: 3

Youth career
- 1986–1993: Sokol Hrotovice
- 1993–1995: FC Slavia Třebíč
- 1995–1999: FC Zbrojovka Brno

Senior career*
Years	Team	Apps	(Gls)
2000–2004	1. FC Brno	60	(2)
2004–2009	Denizlispor	145	(2)
2009	Skoda Xanthi	7	(0)
2009–2010	1. FC Slovácko	22	(1)
2010–2014	Wacker Innsbruck	109	(5)
- * Club domestic league appearances and goals as of 4 December 2013

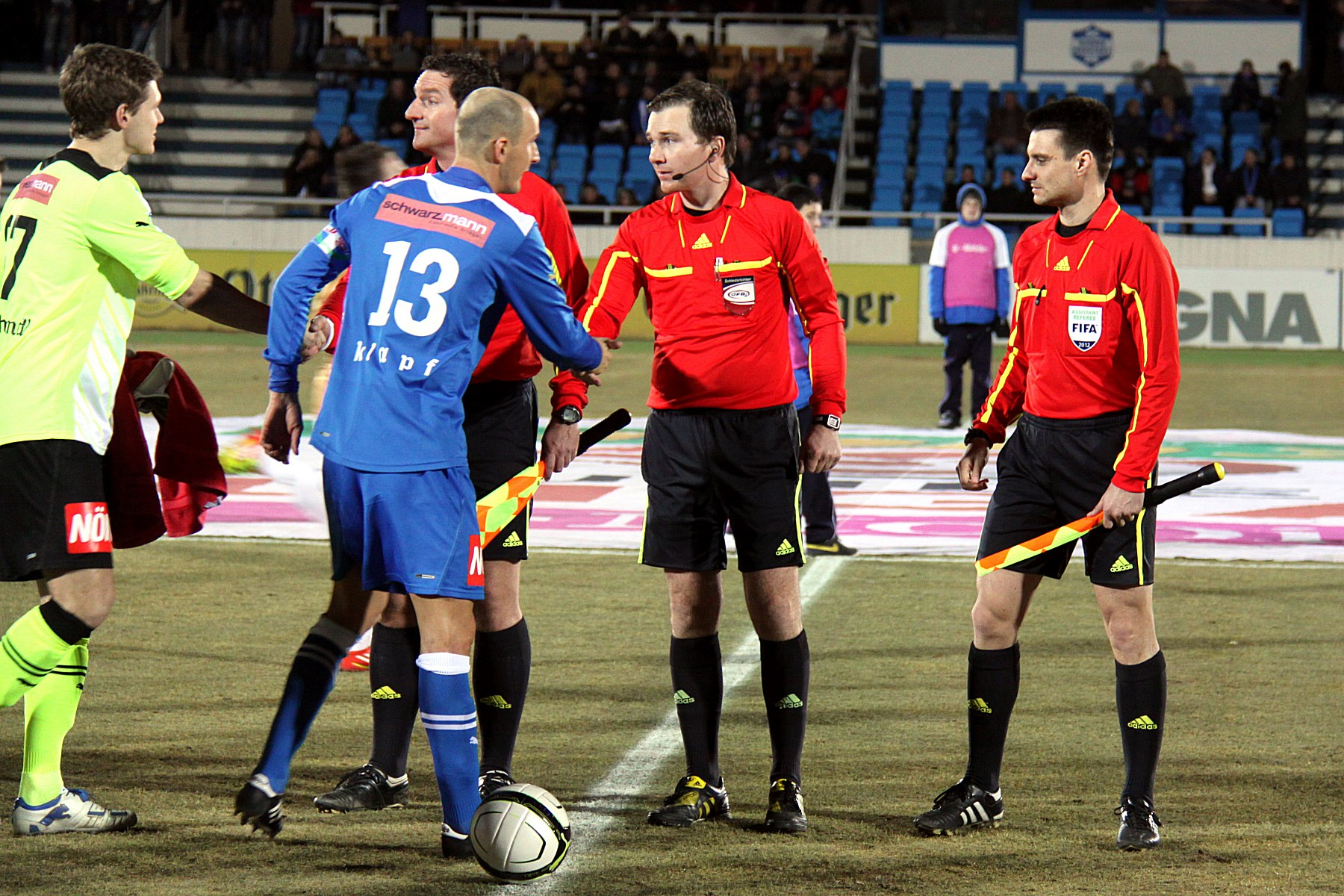
Tomáš Abrahám

Tomáš Abrahám (born 18 April 1979) is a Czech former football player who last played professionally for Wacker Innsbruck as a defensive midfielder.

== Career ==
=== Club career ===
Abrahám played in his youth for Sokol Hrotovice and FC Slavia Trebic. With 16 years changed the defensive midfielder for FC Zbrojovka Brno, where he made his debut in the 1998/99 season the first team. The following season he was loaned to the third division side FK Poštorná. Then he returned to Brno, but made only one game in the season 2000/01. He was loaned to the Slovak First League side FK AS Trenčín, where he played only twice Mid-2002, Abraham returned to Brno, where he could ultimately prevail. In two years, he missed only one league game. In 2004, he was hired by the Turkish Süper Lig side Denizlispor, where he is one of the mainstays of the team. In early February 2009 moved on loan to the Greek first division Abrahám Skoda Xanthi, after he had previously refused his contract ending in June 2009 to June 2009 verlängern. Im Abrahám moved to the Czech first division first climber 1. FC Slovácko. There he played 22 times and scored one goal. After a year he left and moved to the upstart Austrian Football Bundesliga promoted Wacker Innsbruck
