= Tozo (footballer) =

Brazilian footballer

Personal information
- Full name: Mariel Everton Cosmo da Silva
- Date of birth: 15 August 1980 (age 46)
- Place of birth: Palmares, Brazil
- Height: 1.80 m (5 ft 11 in)
- Position: Midfielder

Team information
- Current team: Santa Cruz
- Number: 5

Senior career*
Years	Team	Apps	(Gls)
2004–2005	Mogi Mirim		
2005–2006	Náutico		
2006–2010	Gençlerbirliği	36	(1)
2007–2009	→ Hacettepe (loan)	61	(1)
2010–2011	Karabükspor	14	(0)
2012	Náutico	3	(0)
2012	Brasiliense	0	(0)
2013–	Santa Cruz	8	(0)
- * Club domestic league appearances and goals as of 20:43, 11 December 2010 (UTC)

Mariel Everton Cosmo da Silva (born 15 August 1980 in Palmares, Pernambuco), commonly known as Tozo, is a Brazilian former footballer who last played as a midfielder for Santa Cruz.
