= Roman Kratochvíl =

Slovak footballer

Personal information
- Full name: Roman Kratochvíl
- Date of birth: 24 June 1974 (age 52)
- Place of birth: Bratislava, Czechoslovakia
- Height: 1.86 m (6 ft 1 in)
- Positions: Centre back; defensive midfielder

Youth career
- Inter Bratislava

Senior career*
| Years | Team | Apps | (Gls) |
| 1994–2002 | Inter Bratislava | 195 | (33) |
| 2002–2008 | Denizlispor | 229 | (33) |
| 2009 | Konyaspor | 16 | (6) |
| 2010–2017 | Inter Bratislava | 0 | (0) |
| Total | | 411 | (73) |

International career
| 1999–2009 | Slovakia | 36 | (1) |
- * Club domestic league appearances and goals

Roman Kratochvíl (born 24 June 1974) is a Slovak former professional footballer who played for his hometown club Inter Bratislava, as well as Turkish League teams Denizlispor and Konyaspor.

In September 2009, having failed to secure a new contract and suffering from a chronic groin injury he decided to end his professional career. He joined his former team Inter Bratislava in 2010 but did not make any further league appearances.

== International career ==
Kratochvíl made his international debut for Slovakia on 3 March 1999 in a friendly game against Bulgaria.

=== International goal ===
Score and result list Slovakia's goal tally first.

| # | Date | Venue | Opponent | Score | Result | Competition |
|---|---|---|---|---|---|---|
| 1. | 14 June 2000 | Tosu Stadium, Tosu, Japan | Bolivia | 1–0 | 2–0 | 2000 Kirin Cup |

== Honours ==
=== Inter ===
- Corgoň Liga: 2000, 2001
- Slovak Cup: 2000, 2001
