= Neca (footballer) =

Portuguese footballer

Personal information
- Full name: João Alexandre Duarte Ferreira Fernandes
- Date of birth: 31 December 1979 (age 46)
- Place of birth: Lisbon, Portugal
- Height: 1.79 m (5 ft 10 in)
- Position: Midfielder

Team information
- Current team: Oțelul Galați (assistant)

Youth career
- 1989–1990: Olivais Moscavide
- 1990–1997: Belenenses

Senior career*
Years	Team	Apps	(Gls)
1997–2005	Belenenses	143	(17)
2005–2006	Vitória Guimarães	29	(1)
2006–2007	Marítimo	10	(0)
2007	→ Konyaspor (loan)	31	(8)
2008–2009	Ankaraspor	41	(6)
2010–2012	Vitória Setúbal	59	(10)
2012–2013	Konyaspor	25	(9)
2013–2015	Farense	62	(9)
2015–2016	Pinhalnovense	24	(4)
2016–2018	Farense	48	(8)
Total		472	(72)

International career
1999	Portugal U20	4	(0)
2001–2002	Portugal U21	4	(0)
2002	Portugal	2	(0)

Managerial career
- 2018–2019: B-SAD U23
- 2019: Casa Pia (assistant)
- 2021–2024: Farense (assistant)
- 2024: Marítimo (assistant)
- 2025–2026: Athletic-MG (assistant)
- 2026–: Oțelul Galați (assistant)
- * Club domestic league appearances and goals

João Alexandre Duarte Ferreira Fernandes (born 31 December 1979), known as Neca, is a Portuguese former professional footballer who played as a midfielder. He is currently assistant coach of Liga I club Oțelul Galați.

He amassed Primeira Liga totals of 225 matches and 29 goals over the course of 12 seasons, representing in the competition Belenenses, Vitória de Guimarães, Marítimo and Vitória de Setúbal. He also played in Turkey.

== Club career ==
Born in Lisbon, Neca started playing professionally with local C.F. Os Belenenses, being a starter from an early age. For 2005–06 he moved to fellow Primeira Liga club Vitória S.C. on a two-year contract as a free agent and, although he was an important first-team member in his only season, the Guimarães-based side were relegated and he left.

Neca signed for C.S. Marítimo in summer 2006, on a Bosman transfer. After limited playing time, he was loaned out to Konyaspor in January 2007. He was definitely released by the Madeirans in December but stayed in Turkey, joining Ankaraspor.

On 4 January 2010, Neca agreed on a return to his country, signing with struggling Vitória F.C. until the end of the campaign and contributing 11 games and two goals as the Sadinos eventually escaped relegation. He returned to Konyaspor aged 32, with the club now in the second division.

== International career ==
Neca represented Portugal at both the 1999 FIFA World Youth Championship and the 2002 UEFA European Under-21 Championship. In 2002, courtesy of his consistent performances at Belenenses, he earned two full caps.

== Career statistics ==
=== International ===
Appearances and goals by national team and year
National team	Year	Apps	Goals
Portugal
Portugal	2002	2	0
Total		2	0
