= Antonio de Nigris =

Mexican footballer (1978–2009)

- de Nigris training with Mexico

Personal information
- Full name: Antonio de Nigris Guajardo
- Date of birth: 1 April 1978
- Place of birth: Monterrey, Mexico
- Date of death: 15 November 2009 (aged 31)
- Place of death: Larissa, Greece
- Height: 1.86 m (6 ft 1 in)
- Position: Striker

Youth career
- 1995–1999: Monterrey

Senior career*
Years	Team	Apps	(Gls)
1999	Monterrey	0	(5)
2000–2002	América	65	(37)
2002	→ Villarreal (loan)	3	(0)
2003–2004	Poli Ejido	31	(2)
2004	Once Caldas	19	(1)
2004–2005	Puebla	13	(1)
2005	Pumas	15	(2)
2006	Monterrey	1	(0)
2006	Santos	2	(1)
2006–2007	Gaziantepspor	39	(15)
2008	Ankaraspor	25	(7)
2009	Ankaragücü	14	(2)
2009	AEL	7	(0)
Total		248	(70)

International career
2001–2008	Mexico	17	(4)
Medal record
Representing Mexico
Runner-up	Copa America	2001
- * Club domestic league appearances and goals

Antonio de Nigris Guajardo (Spanish pronunciation: [anˈtonjo ðe ˈniɣɾis]; 1 April 1978 – 15 November 2009) was a Mexican professional footballer who played as a striker.

During his career, he played in six countries, also representing twelve clubs in nine years. He died of heart failure at the age of 31 on 15 November 2009.

== Club career ==
Born in Monterrey, Nuevo León, de Nigris became interested in sports at a young age and began his football career with C.F. Monterrey. In February 2003, he was loaned to Villarreal CF in Spain's La Liga, joining a team in 13th place but averaging under a goal a game. He made his debut on 2 March, coming on as a 70th-minute substitute for Javier Farinós and scoring the last-minute winner for a 2–1 victory at home to Rayo Vallecano.

De Nigris, who could play freely in the European Union due to his Italian passport, moved on a permanent deal to Polideportivo Ejido in the Segunda División in July 2003. As with his time at Villarreal, he scored only twice in his one season in the province of Almería.

De Nigris returned to the Americas with Once Caldas of Colombia, with whom, in the 2004 Intercontinental Cup, he scored in the penalty shootout defeat against F.C. Porto. After playing for Puebla, Pumas and Monterrey again back home, he was signed by Santos FC of Brazil on 20 March 2006, making his debut against Brasiliense Futebol Clube in a Copa do Brasil match.

Later in 2006, de Nigris switched to Turkey, playing in quick succession for three teams in the country: Gaziantepspor, Ankaraspor and Ankaragücü. He was released from the latter due to heart problems, and his license was cancelled by the Turkish Football Federation. In 2009–10, he moved teams again, signing with Greek outfit AEL for two years.

== International career ==
A Mexican international since 2001, de Nigris represented his nation at that year's Copa América. His debut came on 7 March in a friendly against Brazil in Guadalajara, scoring the 2–0 goal in an eventual 3–3 draw. Eighteen days later he scored twice in a 4–0 home win over Jamaica in 2002 FIFA World Cup qualification.

After a seven-year absence from the national squad, de Nigris was called by national coach Hugo Sánchez for a friendly match against the United States, on 6 February 2008. He underperformed in that match and was substituted, but would also appear against Ghana in London; he totalled 17 appearances with four goals until his death, at 31.

== Personal life ==
De Nigris' younger brother Aldo was also a professional footballer who played as a striker with Monterrey and the national team as well, while older sibling "Poncho" is a TV celebrity and influencer. He was of Italian descent and was given the nickname Tano by his Italian grandfather.

On 16 November 2009, Jorge Urdiales, president of former club Monterrey, confirmed de Nigris had died, apparently from a heart attack.

== Career statistics ==
=== International ===
As of match played 25 March 2008

National team	Year	Apps	Goals
Mexico	2001	14	4
Mexico	2002	1	0
Mexico	2008	2	0
Total		17	4

=== International goals ===
No.	Date	Venue	Opponent	Score	Result	Competition	Ref.
1.	7 March 2001	Estadio Jalisco, Guadalajara, Mexico	Brazil	2–0	3–3	Friendly	
2.	25 March 2001	Estadio Azteca, Mexico City, Mexico	Jamaica	1–0	4–0	2002 World Cup qualification	
3.	25 March 2001	Estadio Azteca, Mexico City, Mexico	Jamaica	2–0	4–0	2002 World Cup qualification	
4.	23 August 2001	Estadio Luis de la Fuente, Veracruz, Mexico	Liberia	5–4	5–4	Friendly	

== Honours ==
Mexico

- Copa América runner-up: 2001
