= Sérgio (footballer, born 1981) =

Brazilian footballer

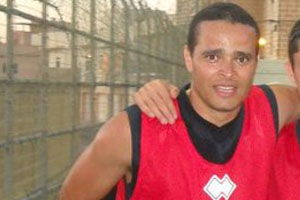
- Sérgio in 2010

Personal information
- Full name: Sérgio Pacheco de Oliveira
- Date of birth: 7 June 1981 (age 45)
- Place of birth: Rio de Janeiro, Brazil
- Height: 5 ft 8 in (1.73 m)
- Position: Attacking midfielder

Senior career*
Years	Team	Apps	(Gls)
1999–2002	NAC Breda	72	(17)
2002–2006	Roda JC	117	(26)
2006–2007	Metalurh Donetsk	31	(2)
2008–2009	Sivasspor	15	(0)
2009–2010	Inter Baku	0	(0)
2010–2011	Tarxien Rainbows	22	(10)
2011–2012	Toros Neza	10	(0)
2013–2014	Duque de Caxias	1	(0)
Total		268	(55)
- * Club domestic league appearances and goals

Sérgio Pacheco de Oliveira (born 7 June 1981), commonly known as Sérgio, is a Brazilian former professional footballer who played as a attacking midfielder.

== Career ==
He began at home with football at Colegio, from whence he was brought to NAC Breda. In his first season at NAC Breda, 1999–2000, he became champion of the Eerste Divisie and was promoted to the Eredivisie, as he played 21 matches and scored 3 times. Sergio played in the Eredivisie two more seasons for NAC, where he made 51 appearances and scored 14 goals. Together with his compatriot Cristiano they moved to Roda JC together, where in 2005 he began his fourth season. In the previous three seasons he made 19 goals in 84 games. The attacking midfielder left in the summer of 2006 to Metalurh Donetsk. In the winter of 2008 he was transferred to Turkish club Sivasspor.

Sérgio signed a contract with Maltese Premier League club Tarxien Rainbows during the 2010–11 transfer window. There, found himself re-united with his former NAC Breda teammate Cristiano. In the 2011–12 season, he played at the second level in Mexico for Toros Neza, a feeder club of Monarcas Morelia. In 2013, he played for Duque de Caxias.
