= Cola Turka =

Turkish cola soft drink

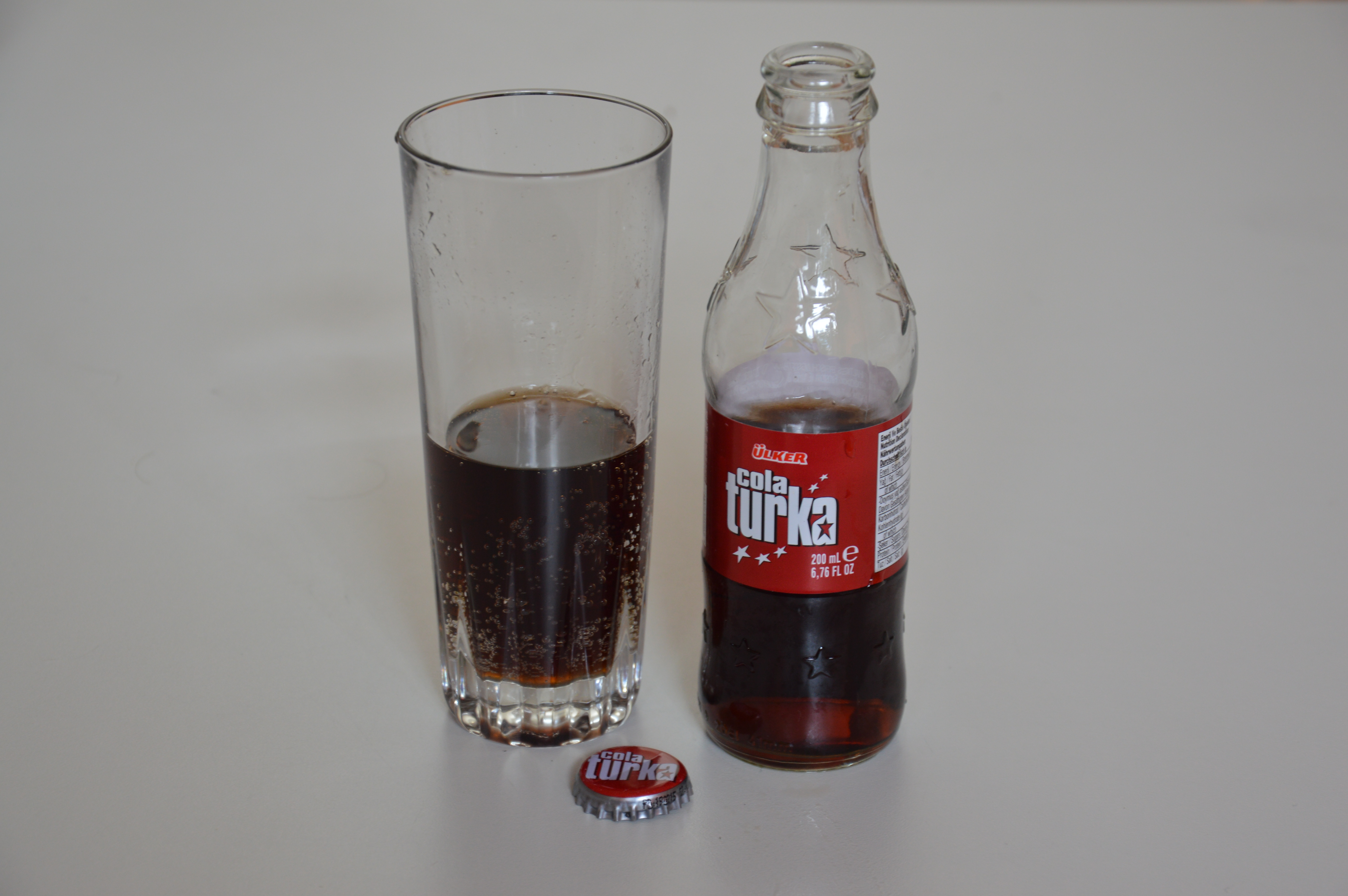
- Type: Cola
- Manufacturer: Ülker; DyDo DRINCO
- Origin: Turkey
- Introduced: June 25, 2003; 23 years ago
- Color: Red and white
- Website: https://www.dydodrinco.com.tr/tr/markalarimiz/cola-turka-icecek.html

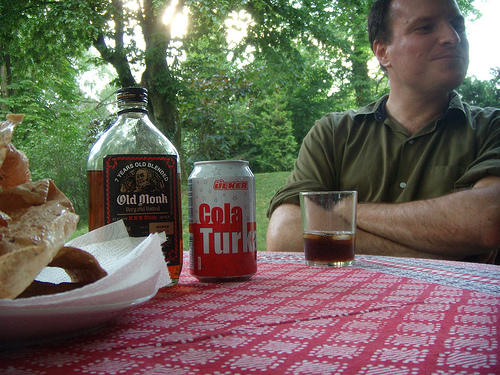
A person consuming Cola Turka, 2007

Cola Turka is a formerly Turkish, now Japanese cola brand that is also sold in Austria, Belgium, Bosnia and Herzegovina, Cuba, Denmark, France, Germany, the Netherlands and Canada.

== TV commercials ==
Two television commercials for Cola Turka (which are presented more like short-subject comic films) feature American actor Chevy Chase playing a confused American who notices his friend, wearing a stereotypically American cowboy hat, using some peculiar words from Turkish culture while drinking a can of Cola Turka. Upon Chase's character drinking Cola Turka in the second commercial, he spontaneously displays Turkish traits like saying Turkish idioms, singing a Turkish folk song, and in the final part of the second commercial, unexpectedly sporting a mustache. The commercials were filmed on location in New York and are in English with Turkish subtitles.

== Variations ==
Cola Turka is sold in 200ml glass bottles, 330ml cans and 500ml, 1 litre, 2 litre, 2.5 and 3 litre PET bottles.

Cola Turka has 4 variants:

- Cola Turka
- Cola Turka MIX (Orange flavored)
- Cola Turka Light
- Cola Turka Cappuccino (designed in 2007 by Manhal)

== History ==
Cola Turka once had a campaign in the late 2000s in which for a few caps, a Cola Turka shirt, soccer ball and other prizes were given.

In 2015, Yıldız Holding sold the brand Cola Turka to Japanese beverage giant DyDo Drinco. The reason was due to Cola Turka produced at a loss. Unlike Coca-Cola which uses 2.5 liter plastic bottles, Cola Turka was produced in a 3 liter bottle which increased the cost. Moreover, other drinks were sold. Sunny (a brand of juices), Link (fruit flavored small drink known for being served along with sandwiches, uses artificial flavors instead of juice) and Camlica (a brand of carbonated lemon flavoured drink available in raspberry, pear, stronger lemon, orange, diet, mandarin flavors at certain retailers, and in a glass bottle) After brands were sold, the recipes changed to a more tonic, watery based drink, most affected was Camlica. This decreased the sales and today, Camlica, Cola Turka, Sunny, Link is rarely seen.

Another reason was unfair competition by Coca Cola due to a high amount of campaigns, discounts, contests, and ads that crushed Cola Turka's share in the general soft drinks market
