= Christian Akande Kotchoni =

Beninese footballer

Christian Kotchoni
Personal information
- Full name: Christian Akande Kotchoni
- Date of birth: 20 July 1988 (age 38)
- Place of birth: Parakou, Benin
- Height: 1.95 m (6 ft 5 in)
- Position: Striker

Team information
- Current team: Türk Ocağı

Youth career
- Cheminots Cotonou

Senior career*
Years	Team	Apps	(Gls)
2008–2009	Denizlispor	20	(7)
2008–2009	→ Kartalspor (loan)	13	(5)
2009–2011	Requins FC		
2011–2012	Al Nahda		
2012–2013	AS Police		
2013–2014	Cape Town		
2018–	Türk Ocağı		
- * Club domestic league appearances and goals

Christian Akande Kotchoni (born 20 July 1988 in Parakou) is a Beninese international footballer who plays as a striker for Türk Ocağı.

== Career ==
Akane began his career with Cheminots Cotonou than joined in January 2008 to Denizlispor, played his first game in the Süper Lig on 13 January 2009 vs. Bursaspor and scored than on 10 February 2009 his first goal against Konyaspor. After six months was loaned out on 4 August 2008 to Kartalspor and played his first match on 1 September 2008 vs Altay Izmir. He left in summer 2009 the Turkey and his club Denizlispor to return to Benin, who signed for Requins de l'Atlantique FC.
