= Marcus Vinícius (footballer, born 1985) =

Brazilian footballer

Marcus Vinícius Cesário
Personal information
- Full name: Marcus Vinícius Cesário
- Date of birth: March 22, 1985 (age 41)
- Place of birth: Ribeirão Preto, SP, Brazil
- Height: 1.86 m (6 ft 1 in)
- Position: Central defender

Team information
- Current team: İstanbul B.B.
- Number: 15

Youth career
- 2002: Corinthians

Senior career*
| Years | Team | Apps | (Gls) |
| 2003–2007 | Corinthians | 56 | (3) |
| 2007–2013 | İstanbul B.B. | 85 | (7) |
| 2014 | Guaratinguetá | | |
| 2015 | Marília AC | | |
- * Club domestic league appearances and goals as of 17 May 2010

Marcus Vinícius Cesário (born 22 March 1986 in Ribeirão Preto, São Paulo) is a retired Brazilian football centre-back.

== Honours ==
- São Paulo's Cup (U 20): 2004
- Brazilian League: 2005
