= Kauê (footballer, born 1983) =

Brazilian footballer

Personal information
- Full name: Kauê Caetano da Silva
- Date of birth: August 19, 1983 (age 43)
- Place of birth: Itu, Sao Paulo, Brazil
- Height: 1.70 m (5 ft 7 in)
- Position: Left winger

Senior career*
Years	Team	Apps	(Gls)
2002–2006	Ituano		
2004	→ Internacional (loan)		
2006–2010	Konyaspor	119	(13)
2010–2011	São Bernardo		
2011	ABC	5	(0)
2011	Grêmio Barueri	1	(0)
2012	Fortaleza	5	(0)
2013	CRAC		
2013–2014	Treze		
- * Club domestic league appearances and goals

Kauê Caetano da Silva (born August 19, 1983), known as Kauê, is a Brazilian former professional footballer who played as a left winger.
