= Yılmaz Vural =

Turkish footballer and manager

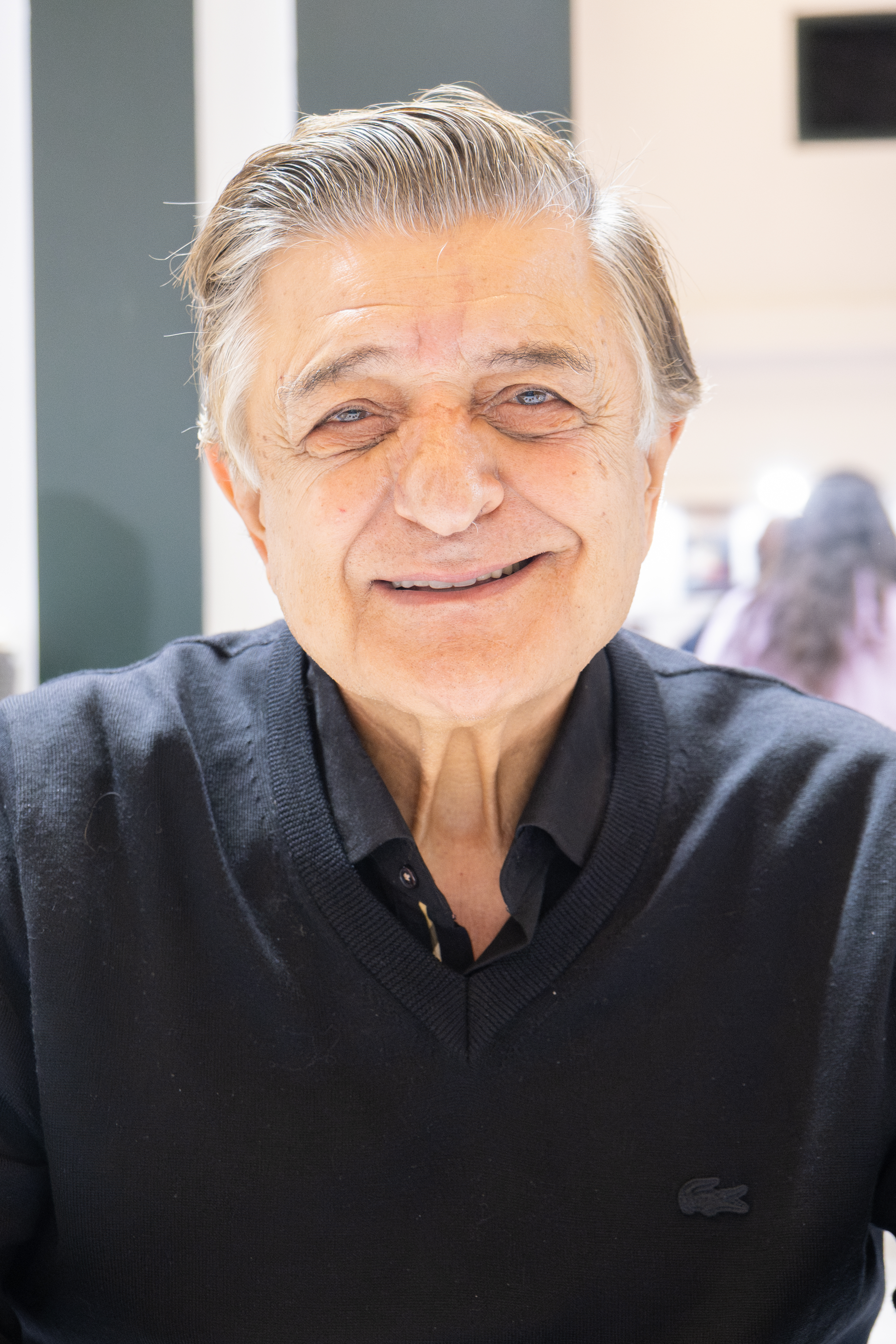

Personal information
- Date of birth: 1 January 1953 (age 73)
- Place of birth: Adapazarı, Turkey
- Height: 1.74 m (5 ft 8 1/2 in)
- Position: Midfielder

Senior career*
| Years | Team | Apps | (Gls) |
- Hacettepe
- Sivasspor

Managerial career
- 1986–1988: Malatyaspor (assistant)
- 1988–1989: Antalyaspor (assistant)
- 1989: Samsunspor (assistant)
- 1989–1990: Bursaspor (assistant)
- 1990: Karşıyaka (assistant)
- 1991: Adanaspor (assistant)
- 1991–1992: Bursaspor (assistant)
- 1992–1993: Bursaspor
- 1993–1994: Gaziantepspor
- 1995: Eskişehirspor
- 1996–1997: Sarıyer
- 1997: Trabzonspor
- 1997–1998: Gençlerbirliği
- 1998–1999: Konyaspor
- 1999: Dardanelspor
- 1999–2000: Bursaspor
- 2000–2001: Denizlispor
- 2001: Diyarbakırspor
- 2003–2004: Adanaspor
- 2004: Rizespor
- 2005: Ankaragücü
- 2005–2007: Antalyaspor
- 2008: Manisaspor
- 2008–2009: Kocaelispor
- 2009–2011: Kasımpaşa
- 2011: Konyaspor
- 2012: Sakaryaspor
- 2012–2013: Elazığspor
- 2014: Mersin İdman Yurdu
- 2014–2015: Osmanlıspor
- 2015: Karabükspor
- 2015: Gençlerbirliği
- 2016: Adana Demirspor
- 2017: Göztepe
- 2018: Giresunspor
- 2018: Eskişehirspor
- 2018–2019: Adana Demirspor
- 2020: Akhisarspor
- 2021: Erzurumspor F.K.
- * Club domestic league appearances and goals

Yılmaz Vural (born 1 January 1953) is a Turkish football manager and former player. He played as a midfielder for Hacettepe and Sivasspor in the 1970s.

== Career ==
He is most known for his aggressive coaching style. Vural managed most of the clubs in the Turkish League, apart from the three giants which are Beşiktaş, Fenerbahçe, and Galatasaray. On 11 March 2008, he was sacked after his unsuccessful performance at Vestel Manisaspor with collecting just 7 points in 5 league matches. Recently, his name was given to a street in Adapazarı, where he was born and raised, in accordance with a local municipality project. On 10 October 2012, he was appointed to be the manager of Elazığspor. On 19 May 2013, he resigned from Elazığspor. On 30 December 2015 Vural was famously sacked from Gençlerbirliği by owner İlhan Cavcav after six days and only one game - a 2–0 away loss to Eskisehirspor.

== Popular culture ==
Yilmaz is well known with his characteristic behaviors. After his iconic post-interviews, he became popular in Turkish media. He plays as an actor at the ads of Lipton in Turkey.

== Managerial statistics ==
As of 15 March 2020

Managerial record by team and tenure
| Team | Nat | From | To | Record | | | | |
| Team | Nat | From | To | G | W | D | L | Win % |
|---|---|---|---|---|---|---|---|---|
| Bursaspor | (Turkey) | 26 August 1992 | 31 May 1993 | 31 | 12 | 6 | 13 | 38.71 |
| Gaziantepspor | (Turkey) | 13 October 1993 | 31 May 1994 | 24 | 8 | 4 | 12 | 33.33 |
| Eskişehirspor | (Turkey) | 23 May 1995 | 14 December 1995 | 21 | 9 | 1 | 11 | 42.86 |
| Sarıyer | (Turkey) | 1 March 1996 | 3 February 1997 | 33 | 15 | 8 | 10 | 45.45 |
| Trabzonspor | (Turkey) | 3 February 1997 | 9 October 1997 | 30 | 18 | 6 | 6 | 60.00 |
| Gençlerbirliği | (Turkey) | 19 November 1997 | 30 June 1998 | 24 | 7 | 8 | 9 | 29.17 |
| Konyaspor | (Turkey) | 7 September 1998 | 24 February 1999 | 17 | 9 | 2 | 6 | 52.94 |
| Dardanelspor | (Turkey) | 18 March 1999 | 30 June 1999 | 10 | 5 | 0 | 5 | 50.00 |
| Bursaspor | (Turkey) | 16 September 1999 | 27 September 2000 | 41 | 15 | 8 | 18 | 36.59 |
| Denizlispor | (Turkey) | 27 September 2000 | 31 May 2001 | 30 | 12 | 7 | 11 | 40.00 |
| Diyarbakırspor | (Turkey) | 26 June 2001 | 22 November 2001 | 13 | 3 | 3 | 7 | 23.08 |
| Adanaspor | (Turkey) | 20 February 2003 | 14 January 2004 | 32 | 9 | 5 | 18 | 28.13 |
| Rizespor | (Turkey) | 5 February 2004 | 30 June 2004 | 16 | 9 | 0 | 7 | 56.25 |
| Ankaragücü | (Turkey) | 18 February 2005 | 30 June 2005 | 15 | 5 | 3 | 7 | 33.33 |
| Antalyaspor | (Turkey) | 30 June 2005 | 30 June 2007 | 70 | 28 | 22 | 20 | 40.00 |
| Manisaspor | (Turkey) | 18 January 2008 | 11 March 2008 | 8 | 1 | 2 | 5 | 12.50 |
| Kocaelispor | (Turkey) | 3 October 2008 | 22 January 2009 | 11 | 2 | 2 | 7 | 18.18 |
| Kasımpaşa | (Turkey) | 7 September 2009 | 5 January 2011 | 54 | 15 | 17 | 22 | 27.78 |
| Konyaspor | (Turkey) | 17 February 2011 | 30 June 2011 | 13 | 1 | 6 | 6 | 7.69 |
| Sakaryaspor | (Turkey) | 17 February 2012 | 30 June 2012 | 13 | 0 | 4 | 9 | 0.00 |
| Elazığspor | (Turkey) | 18 October 2012 | 30 June 2013 | 28 | 10 | 10 | 8 | 35.71 |
| Mersin İdman Yurdu | (Turkey) | 7 March 2014 | 16 May 2014 | 12 | 5 | 4 | 3 | 41.67 |
| Osmanlıspor | (Turkey) | 25 December 2014 | 13 January 2015 | 2 | 0 | 1 | 1 | 0.00 |
| Karabükspor | (Turkey) | 24 February 2015 | 30 June 2015 | 13 | 3 | 2 | 8 | 23.08 |
| Gençlerbirliği | (Turkey) | 24 December 2015 | 30 December 2015 | 1 | 0 | 0 | 1 | 0.00 |
| Adana Demirspor | (Turkey) | 26 April 2016 | 2 June 2016 | 6 | 2 | 2 | 2 | 33.33 |
| Göztepe | (Turkey) | 23 March 2017 | 14 June 2017 | 12 | 6 | 2 | 4 | 50.00 |
| Giresunspor | (Turkey) | 8 February 2018 | 23 February 2018 | 3 | 0 | 0 | 3 | 0.00 |
| Eskişehirspor | (Turkey) | 4 April 2018 | 31 May 2018 | 5 | 3 | 1 | 1 | 60.00 |
| Adana Demirspor | (Turkey) | 21 November 2018 | 3 February 2019 | 10 | 3 | 3 | 4 | 30.00 |
| Akhisarspor | (Turkey) | 29 January 2020 | Present | 9 | 5 | 2 | 2 | 55.56 |
| Total | | | | 607 | 220 | 141 | 246 | 36.24 |
