= List of French Jews =

Jews have lived in France since Roman times with a rich and complex history. In the Middle Ages, French kings expelled most of the original Ashkenazi Jewish population to Germany. Since the French Revolution (and Emancipation), Jews have been able to contribute to all aspects of French culture and society. In 1870, the Cremieux decree gave full French citizenship to North-African Jews living in the Maghreb under French colonization. During World War II, a significant number of Jews living in Metropolitan France were murdered in the Holocaust or deported to Nazi death camps by the French Vichy government. After 1945, France served as a haven for Askhenazi refugees. After the independences of Morocco and Tunisia and the end of the Algerian War, an influx of immigration of Sephardic Jews saw the Jewish population triple to around 600,000, making it the largest Jewish community in Western Europe. Behind the United States and Israel, France ranks 3rd by Jewish population. In 2019, the Jewish Agency evaluated the Jewish population in France to be 450,000, not mentioning French citizens with only one Jewish parent or grandparent.

The following is a list of some prominent Jews and people of Jewish origins, among others (not all of them practice, or practiced, the Jewish religion) who were born in, or are very strongly associated with, France. The strongly secular French nationality law forbids any statistics or lists based on ethnic or religious membership.

== Historical figures ==
=== Activists ===
- René Cassin (1887–1976), drafted the Universal Declaration of Human Rights, won Nobel Peace Prize (1968)
- Lewis Goldsmith (c. 1763–1846), English-born journalist and political writer
- Alain Krivine (1941–2022), student leader and Trotskyist MEP
- André Spire (1868–1966), lawyer, journalist, poet, Jewish society and French Zionism leader

=== Clergymen ===
- Aaron ben Perez of Avignon, fl.1300–1310
- Abraham Auerbach (mid 1700s – 3 November 1846), Alsatian-born rabbi and liturgical poet. Fled France for Germany after imprisonment during the Reign of Terror.
- Benjamin ben Samuel (11th-century), Talmudist and liturgical poet
- Gilles Bernheim (born 1952), chief rabbi of France 2009–2013
- Mordecai Karmi (1749–1825), rabbi and Talmudic writer
- Jean-Marie Lustiger (1926–2007), former Catholic archbishop of Paris and cardinal; converted to Catholicism when he was 13
- Rashi (1040–1105), medieval rabbi based in Troyes, famed as the author of the first comprehensive commentary on the Talmud, as well as a comprehensive commentary on the Tanakh (Hebrew Bible)
- Joseph Sitruk (1944–2016), Tunisian-born former Chief Rabbi of France, 1987–2008
- Rabbeinu Tam (1100–1171), rabbinical authority, grandson of Rashi

=== Military ===
- Henri Rottembourg (1769–1857), General of Brigade, Grand Armeé, Napoleonic Wars
- Denise Bloch (1916–1945), World War II SOE spy
- Nissim de Camondo (1892–1917), pilot in World War I
- Alfred Dreyfus (1859–1935), military officer
- Robert Gamzon, French resistant, commanding the 2nd company of Maquis de Vabre
- Léon Geismar (1895-1944), colonial governor of French West Africa
- David Galula (1919–1967), officer and theoretician of counterinsurgency
- Alter Mojze Goldman (1909–1988), Polish-born, active during the French Résistance; father of Jean-Jacques Goldman, Robert Goldman and Pierre Goldman
- Jean-Pierre Lévy (resistance leader) (1911–1996), co-founder of Franc-Tireur (movement)
- Adolphe Rabinovitch (1918–1944), special operations executive officer in France during the Second World War.
- Paulette Weill Oppert (1911–2005), Second World War resistance fighter

=== Nobles ===
- Cahen d'Anvers, Papal title of 1867
- Liefmann Calmer, Baron of Picquigny and Viscount of Amiens
- d'Estienne, one of the early Franco/Jewish ennoblements in 16th-century Provence, after the family converted to Catholicism and changed their name from Cohen to Estienne in 1501
- Maurice Ephrussi, Russian Empire-born, husband of Beatrice de Rothschild
- Arnaud Henry Salas-Perez, Prince Obolensky (1982-), French born fashion editor and Designer, half Jewish.
- Koenigswarter
- de Rothschild

=== Philanthropists ===
- Angelo Donati (1885–1960), Italian-born, from 1919 to 1960, saved the Jews from Nazi persecution in the Italian-occupied France between 1942 and 1943 while staying in Nice

=== Politicians ===
- Gabriel Attal (born 1989), Jewish father; Prime Minister of France (2024); is also the first openly gay prime minister of France.
- Jacques Attali (born 1943), Algerian-born advisor to President François Mitterrand from 1981 to 1991
- Robert Badinter (1928–2024), justice minister, 1981–86; abolished the death penalty in France
- Patrick Balkany (born 1948), member of the National Assembly of France
- Léon Blum (1872–1950), prime minister, 1936–37, 1938, and 1946–47
- Élisabeth Borne (born 1961), Jewish father, first woman of Jewish descent to serve as prime minister, (2022–2024).
- Agnès Buzyn (born 1962), medical doctor and university professor, minister of health from 2017 to 2020
- Daniel Cohn-Bendit (born 1945), French-born German politician, active in both countries, best known as leader of the 1968 student uprising in France; more recently a leader of the European Greens
- Jean-François Copé (born 1964), president of the Union for a Popular Movement (UMP) Group in the French National Assembly
- Adolphe Crémieux (1796–1880), justice minister, 1848, 1870–71
- Julien Dray (born 1955), Algerian-born member of the National Assembly of France for the Socialist Party (PS)
- Michel Debré (1912–1996), prime minister 1959–1962
- Léon Halévy (1802–1883), civil servant, historian, and dramatist; son of Élie Halévy, brother of Fromental Halévy and father of Ludovic Halévy and grandfather to Élie Halévy, Daniel Halévy and Lucien-Anatole Prévost-Paradol
- Roger Karoutchi (born 1951), Moroccan-born secretary of state to the prime minister, with responsibility for relations with Parliament
- Louis-Lucien Klotz (1868–1930), journalist and politician; minister of finance during World War I
- Bernard Kouchner (born 1939), minister of foreign affairs (2007–2010) and physician,.co-founder of NGO's Médecins Sans Frontières and Médecins du Monde
- Henri Krasucki (1924–2003), Polish-born former secretary general of the Confédération générale du travail (CGT) from 1982 to 1992
- Jack Lang (born 1939), minister of culture (1981–1986, 1988–1993) and minister of education (1992–1993, 2000–2002)
- Pierre Lellouche (born 1951), Tunisian-born member of the Union for a Popular Movement (UMP) party
- Georges Mandel (1885–1944), interior minister, 1939
- René Mayer (1895–1972), prime minister 1953
- Pierre Mendès France (1907–1982), prime minister, 1954–55; withdrew from Indochina
- Alexandre Millerand (1859–1943), first Jewish prime minister, 1920, and first Jewish president of France, serving 1920 to 1924
- Jules Moch (1893–1985), transport minister, 1945–47; interior minister, 1947–50; defense minister, 1950–51
- Pierre Moscovici (born 1957), European Union economic affairs commissioner, former French finance minister and member of the French Parliament for the Socialist Party (PS)
- Yaël Braun-Pivet (born 1970), Jewish grandparents, first practicing Jew, as well as woman, to serve as President of the French National Assembly, serving since 2022.
- Maurice Schumann (1911–1998), minister of foreign affairs (1969–1973), Jewish father
- Alexandre Stavisky (1886–1934), Ukrainian-born financier and embezzler; Stavisky Affair
- Abraham Schrameck (1867–1948), minister of the interior, and colonial governor of French Madagascar, senator.
- Dominique Strauss-Kahn (born 1949), finance minister, 1997–99; president of the International Monetary Fund, 2007–11
- Simone Veil (1927–2017), health minister, 1974–76; legalized abortion; President of the European Parliament, 1979–82
- Éric Zemmour (born 1958), French far-right politician, political journalist, essayist and 2022 French presidential election candidate
- Gootchaux Ettinger (1836–1917), French-Brazilian politician, industrialist and businessman. City councillor of Itabaiana in the late 19th century

=== Journalists ===
- Paul Amar (born 1950), journalist and television presenter
- Michel Drucker (born 1942), journalist and TV host
- Erik Izraelewicz (1954–2012), journalist and author, specialised in economics and finance; director and editorial executive of the daily Le Monde
- Ruth Elkrief (born 1960), journalist and television presenter
- Jean-François Kahn (1938–2025), founder of Marianne magazine
- Ariel Wizman (born 1962), Moroccan-born TV journalist, DJ, musician and stage actor{{

== Academic figures ==
=== Scientists ===
- Hippolyte Bernheim (1840–1919), hypnosis pioneer
- Georges Charpak (1924–2010), Polish-born, Nobel Prize in physics in 1992
- Claude Cohen Tannoudji (1933–2026), Nobel Prize in physics in 1997
- Michel Devoret (born 1953), Nobel Prize in physics in 2025
- Serge Haroche (born 1944), Nobel Prize in physics in 2012
- François Jacob (1920–2013), Nobel Prize in medicine in 1965
- Gabriel Lippmann (1845–1921), Luxembourgish-born physicist, Nobel Prize (1908)
- Andre Michael Lwoff (1902–1994), microbiologist, Nobel Prize (1965)

=== Mathematicians ===
- Immanuel Bonfils (c. 1300 – 1377), mathematician and astronomer
- Maurice Block (1816–1901), German-born statistician
- Paul Lévy, mathematician specialized in probability theory
- Benoit Mandelbrot (1924–2010), Polish-born mathematician
- Olinde Rodrigues (1795–1851), mathematician and social reformer
- Laurent Schwartz (1915–2002), mathematician
- André Weil (1906–1998), mathematician and leader in the Bourbaki group
- Henri Cohen (1947 - ), mathematician and developer of the PARI/GP software

=== Social scientists ===
- Albert Aftalion (1874–1956), Bulgarian-born French economist
- Raymond Aron (1905–1983), sociologist
- Jacqueline Lévi-Valensi (1932–2004), specialist in the work of Albert Camus
- Élisabeth Badinter (born 1944), sociologist, philosopher and historian
- Julien Benda (1867–1956), philosopher and novelist
- Berachyah (12th or 13th century), philosopher
- Henri Bergson (1859–1941), philosopher, Nobel Prize (1927)
- Danielle Bleitrach (born 1938), sociologist, academic and journalist
- Marc Bloch (1886–1944), historian and Resistance leader
- Hélène Cixous (born 1937), Algerian-born feminist critic
- Jacques Derrida (1930–2004), Algerian-born philosopher
- Émile Durkheim (1858–1917), sociologist
- Josy Eisenberg (1933–2017), author, TV host, rabbi, screenwriter
- Bernard B. Fall (1926–1967), political scientist, historian and war correspondent
- Alain Finkielkraut (born 1949), essayist
- Gersonides (1288–1344), philosopher
- Pierre Goldman (1944–1977), philosopher, author, thief; was mysteriously assassinated; son of Alter Mojze Goldman; half-brother to Robert Goldman and Jean-Jacques Goldman (half Jewish)
- Jean Gottmann (1915–1994), Russian Empire-born geographer
- Daniel Halévy (1872–1962), historian; son of Ludovic Halévy, brother to Élie Halévy, grandson of Élie Halévy, half brother to Lucien-Anatole Prévost-Paradol
- Vladimir Jankélévitch (1903–1985), philosopher and musicologist
- Claude Lévi-Strauss (1908–2009), cultural anthropologist and ethnologist
- Emmanuel Lévinas (1906–1995), Russian Empire-born philosopher
- Bernard-Henri Lévy (born 1948), Algerian-born philosopher
- Serge Moscovici (1925–2014), Romanian-born social psychologist, currently the director of the Laboratoire Européen de Psychologie Sociale; father of Pierre Moscovici
- Salomon Reinach (1858–1932), historian and archaeologist
- Maxime Rodinson (1915–2004), historian
- Jacob Rodrigues Pereira (1715–1780), first to teach the deaf
- Ignacy Sachs (1927–2023), Polish-born economist
- George Steiner (1929–2020), literary critic
- Simone Weil (1909–1943), philosopher and mystic

== Cultural figures ==
=== Artists ===
- Antoine Samuel Adam-Salomon (1818–1881), photographer and sculptor
- Christian Boltanski (1944–2021), photographer, sculptor and installation artist (half Jewish)
- Claude Cahun (1894–1954), photographer
- André François (1915–2005), cartoonist
- Alexandre Frenel (1899–1981), École de Paris painter
- Marcel Gotlib (1934–2016), comics artist
- Michel Kikoine (1892–1968), Russian Empire-born painter
- Moise Kisling (1891–1953), Polish-born painter
- Camille Pissarro (1830–1903), Danish West Indies-born painter widely considered the "father of Impressionism"
- Willy Ronis (1910–2009), photographer
- Joann Sfar (born 1971), cartoonist, film director
- Chaïm Soutine (1893–1943), Belarusian-born painter
- Roland Topor (1938–1997), illustrator, novelist
- Pauline Trigère (1909–2002), fashion designer
- Ossip Zadkine (1890–1967), Russian-born sculptor (half Jewish)

=== Film and stage ===
- Anouk Aimée (1932–2024), actress
- Alexandre Aja (born 1978), film director (Haute Tension)
- Mathieu Amalric (born 1965), actor, film director (half Jewish)
- Richard Anconina (born 1953), actor
- Alexandre Arcady (born 1947), film director, scriptwriter
- Arthur (born 1966), Moroccan-born TV producer, TV host
- Aure Atika (born 1970), actress, writer and director
- Yvan Attal (born 1965), Israeli-born filmmaker, actor
- Jean-Pierre Aumont (1911–2001), actor
- Guy Béart (1930–2015), Egyptian-born singer and songwriter
- Emmanuelle Béart (born 1963), actress (half Jewish), daughter of Guy Béart
- Véra Belmont (born 1932), film producer, director and screenwriter
- Maurice Benichou (1943–2019), actor
- Raymond Bernard (1891–1977), film director and screenwriter, son of Tristan Bernard and brother of Jean-Jacques Bernard
- Sarah Bernhardt (1844–1923), stage actress (half Jewish)
- Claude Berri (1934–2009), film director, producer, actor and writer
- Simone Bitton (born 1955), Moroccan-born French-Israeli documentary filmmaker
- Michel Boujenah (born 1952), Tunisian-born humorist, actor, producer, director
- Pierre Braunberger (1905–1990), film producer
- Alain Chabat (born 1958), actor, writer, director
- David Charvet (born 1972), French-born actor and singer (Baywatch) (half Jewish)
- Elie Chouraqui (born 1953), film director, producer, scriptwriter, actor
- Gerard Darmon (born 1948), actor, singer
- Charles Denner (1926–1995), Polish-born actor
- Marcel Dalio (1900–1983), actor
- Pascal Elbé (born 1967), actor
- Gad Elmaleh (born 1971), Moroccan-born humorist, actor, film director, singer, brother of Arié
- Daniel Emilfork (1924–2006), Chilean-born actor
- Jean Epstein (1897–1953), filmmaker, film theorist, literary critic, and novelist (half Jewish)
- Sami Frey (born 1937), actor, director, movie actor
- Charlotte Gainsbourg (born 1971), actress, singer (half Jewish); daughter of Serge Gainsbourg
- Eva Green (born 1980), actress (half Jewish), daughter of Marlène Jobert
- Roger Hanin (1925–2015), actor, director
- Serge Hazanavicius (born 1963), actor
- Michel Hazanavicius (born 1967), film director, screenwriter, and producer
- Anna Held (1872–1918), Polish-born actress
- Isabelle Huppert (born 1953), actress (half Jewish)
- Agnès Jaoui (born 1964), director and actress
- Marlène Jobert (born 1940), actress, author, singer; mother of Eva Green
- Elie Kakou (1960–1999), humorist, actor
- Marin Karmitz (born 1938), Romanian-born producer
- Tcheky Karyo (born 1953), film actor
- Mathieu Kassovitz (born 1967), film director, actor, producer (half Jewish), son of Peter Kassovitz
- Peter Kassovitz (born 1938), Hungarian-born film director and scriptwriter
- Sandrine Kiberlain (born 1968), actress
- Cédric Klapisch (born 1961), film director
- Diane Kurys (born 1948), filmmaker and actress
- Arlette Langmann (born 1946); film editor and screenwriter; sister of Claude Berri
- Greg Lansky (born 1982), pornographic film producer
- Claude Lanzmann (1925–2018), filmmaker
- Mélanie Laurent (born 1983), actress, singer, director
- Claude Lelouch (born 1937), director
- Gilles Lellouche (born 1972), actor (half Jewish)
- Marcel Marceau (1923–2007), mime artist
- Jean-Pierre Melville (1917–1973), film director and screenwriter
- Radu Mihăileanu (born 1958), Romanian-born film director, screenwriter, poet
- Claude Miller (1942–2012), director
- Serge Moati (born 1946), Tunisian-born film director, screenwriter, journalist, artist, political consultant
- Jean-Pierre Mocky (1929–2019), film director, screenwriter and actor
- Marcel Ophüls (born 1927), German-born documentary filmmaker, son of Max Ophüls
- Max Ophüls (1902–1957), German-born film director, father of Marcel Ophüls
- Gérard Oury (1919–2006), film director, screenwriter; father of Danièle Thompson
- Roman Polanski (born 1933), film director, screenwriter, actor (three-fourths Jewish)
- Rachel (1821–1858), Swiss-born stage actress
- Éric Rochant (born 1961), film director and screenwriter.
- Alexandra Rosenfeld (born 1986), Miss France 2006
- Ida Rubinstein (1885–1960), Russian-born Belle Epoque icon
- Suzanne Schiffman (1929–2001), screenwriter, film director (half Jewish)
- Simone Signoret (1921–1985), German-born actress (half Jewish)
- Tomer Sisley (born 1974), German-born actor and comedian
- Estelle Skornik (born 1971), actress
- Nicole Stéphane (1923–2007), film producer, actress, and director
- Charlotte Szlovak (born 1947), Moroccan-born cinematographer, film director, and screenwriter
- Danièle Thompson (born 1942), film director, screenwriter (half Jewish); daughter of Gérard Oury
- Alexandre Trauner (1906–1993), Hungarian-born Academy Award winning Scenic designer
- Michael Vartan (born 1968), actor (half Jewish)
- Francis Veber (born 1937), film director, playwright and screenwriter (half Jewish)
- André Weinfeld (born 1947), film and television producer, director, screenwriter, photographer and journalist
- William Wyler (1902–1981), film director
- Yolande Zauberman, film director and screenwriter
- Elsa Zylberstein (born 1968), actress (half Jewish)

=== Musicians ===
- Charles-Valentin Alkan (1813–1888), composer and pianist
- Franck Amsallem (born 1961), Algerian-born jazz pianist and composer
- Monique Andrée Serf (1930–1997), French singer known as Barbara
- Keren Ann (born 1974), Israeli-born folk singer
- Thomas Bangalter (born 1975), French musician known as half of the electro duo Daft Punk
- Patrick Bruel (born 1959), singer, musician, actor
- Barbara Butch (born 1981), DJ, activist
- Marcel Dadi (1951–1996), guitarist
- Joe Dassin (1938–1980), American-born singer, son of Jules Dassin
- Mike Brant (1947–1975), singer
- Natalie Dessay (born 1965), opera singer soprano (converted to Judaism)
- Sacha Distel (1933–2004), singer, guitarist
- Paul Dukas (1865–1935), composer
- Jean Ferrat (1930–2010), singer-songwriter, poet
- Serge Gainsbourg (1928–1991), singer-songwriter, musician, film composer, actor, film director, writer; father of Charlotte Gainsbourg
- Jean-Jacques Goldman (born 1951), singer-songwriter, musician; son of Alter Mojze Goldman, brother to Robert Goldman and half-brother to Pierre Goldman
- David Guetta (born 1967), DJ, remixer, songwriter
- Fromental Halévy (1799–1862), composer
- Ludovic Halévy (1834–1908), librettist; son of Élie Halévy
- Jenifer (born 1982), French pop singer (half Jewish)
- Joseph Kosma (1905–1969), Hungarian-born film composer
- Norbert Krief (born 1956), guitarist
- Jacques Lanzmann (1927–2006), lyricist; brother of Claude Lanzmann
- Isidore de Lara (1858–1930), English-born composer
- René Leibowitz (1913–1972), Polish-born composer
- Daniel Lévi (1961–2022), singer, composer
- Enrico Macias (born 1938), Algerian-born singer, guitarist
- Emmanuelle Haïm (born 1967), harpsichordist and conductor (half Jewish)
- Darius Milhaud (1892–1974), composer, member of the Groupe des six
- Pierre Monteux (1875–1964), conductor
- Georges Moustaki (1934–2013), Egyptian-born composer, singer
- Yael Naim (born 1978), singer-songwriter, guitarist
- Jacques Offenbach (1819–1880), German-born composer
- Catherine Ringer (born 1957), singer-songwriter, actress
- Sapho (born 1950), Moroccan-born singer
- David Serero (born 1981), French opera singer, actor, producer; his parents are Sephardi Jews from Morocco
- Martial Solal (1927–2024), jazz pianist and composer
- Tal (born 1989), Israeli-born pop / R'n'B singer
- Alexandre Tansman (1897–1986), Polish-born composer, pianist
- Daniel Vangarde (born 1947), French songwriter and producer, father of Thomas Bangalter
- Émile Waldteufel (1837–1915), composer

== Writers and poets ==
- Tristan Bernard (1866–1947), playwright and novelist, father of Raymond Bernard and Jean-Jacques Bernard
- Jean-Jacques Bernard (1888–1974), playwright, son of Tristan Bernard and brother of Raymond Bernard
- Henri Bernstein (1876–1953), playwright
- Henri Blowitz (1825–1903), Bohemian-born journalist
- Paul Celan (1920–1970), Romanian-born poet
- Benjamin Fondane (1898–1944), Romanian-born poet
- Romain Gary (1914–1980), Russian Empire-born novelist
- René Goscinny (1926–1977), comic book author and editor, co-creator of Asterix
- Élie Halévy (1760–1826), Bavarian-born French Hebrew poet, author and secretary of the Jewish community of Paris; father of Fromental Halévy and Léon Halévy
- Marek Halter (born 1936), writer and activist
- Léon Hollaenderski (1808–1878), writer and poet
- Max Jacob (1876–1944), poet
- Edmond Jabès (1912–1991), Egyptian-born poet
- Joseph Joffo (1931–2018), writer
- Gabriel Josipovici (born 1940), novelist
- Gustave Kahn (1859–1936), poet and art critic
- Joseph Kessel (1898–1979), Argentinian-born novelist and journalist
- Justine Lévy (born 1974), novelist, daughter of Bernard-Henri Lévy
- André Maurois (1885–1967), author
- Alain Mamou-Mani (born 1949), Tunisian-born French film producer and writer
- Albert Memmi (1920–2020), Tunisian-born novelist and sociologist
- Catulle Mendès (1841–1909), poet and man of letters (half Jewish)
- Patrick Modiano (born 1945), writer (half Jewish)
- Nine Moati (1938–2021), Tunisian-born novelist Les Belles de Tunis and screenwriter; sister of Serge Moati
- Irène Némirovsky (1903–1942), writer
- Georges Perec (1936–1982), novelist
- Marcel Proust (1871–1922), writer
- Yasmina Reza (born 1959), playwright
- Nathalie Sarraute (1900–1999), Russian-born writer
- Jean-Jacques Schuhl (born 1941), writer
- Anne Sinclair (born 1948), political journalist; wife of Dominique Strauss-Kahn
- André Suarès (1868–1948), poet
- Elsa Triolet (1896–1970), Russian-born novelist
- Tristan Tzara (1896–1963), Romanian-born poet
- Ilarie Voronca (1903–1946), Romanian-born poet and essayist
- Bernard Werber (born 1961), best-selling author

== Business figures ==
- Marcel Bleustein-Blanchet (1906–1996), founder and head of Publicis Groupe
- Moïse de Camondo (1860–1935), Ottoman Empire-born banker
- Isaac and Daniel Carasso, founders of Danone
- André Citroën (1878–1935), founder of Citroën
- Marcel Dassault (1892–1986), aerospace industrialist; converted to Catholicism in 1950
- Achille Fould (1800–1867), financier
- Maurice Girodias (1919–1990), founder of Olympia Press (half Jewish)
- Maurice de Hirsch (1831–1896), banker
- Philippe Kahn (born 1952), founder of Borland
- Gérard Louis-Dreyfus (1932–2016), owner of Louis-Dreyfus & Co. (half Jewish)
- Michel Adam Lisowski (born 1950), Polish-born founder and president of Fashion TV
- André Meyer (1898–1979), French-American financier
- Emile and Isaac Péreire, bankers
- Rothschild banking and wine growing family of France

== Sport figures ==
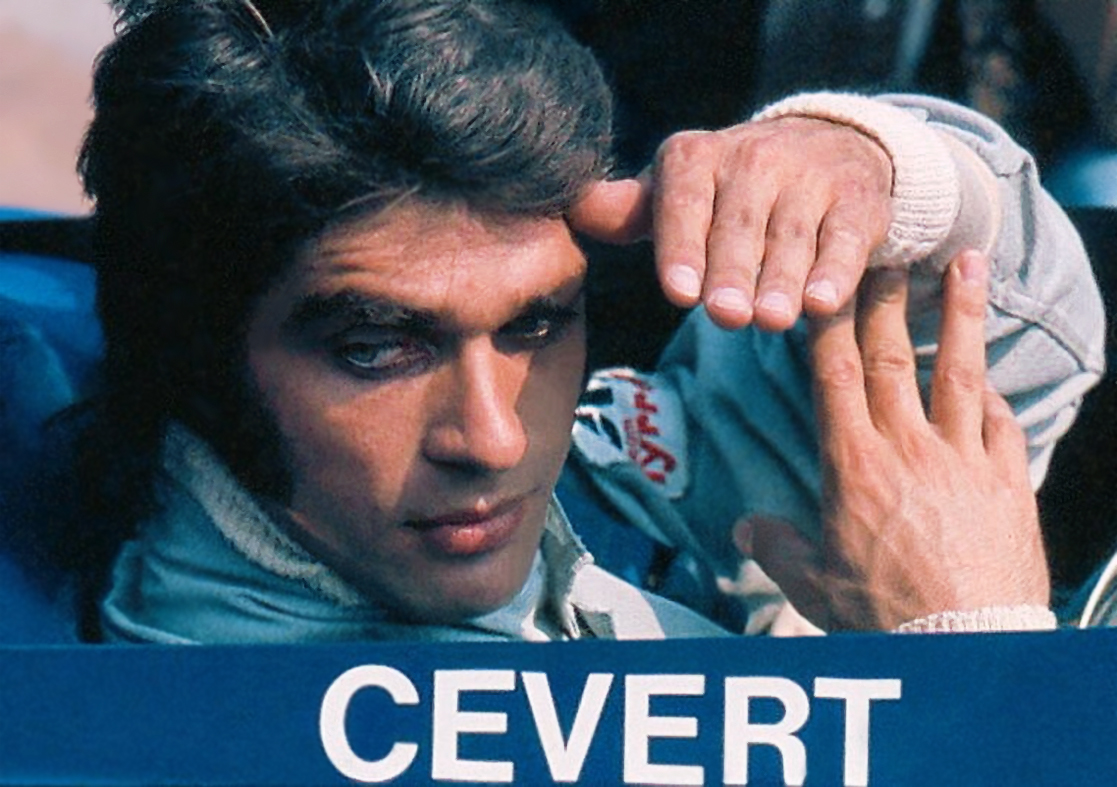
François Cevert

- Sarah Abitbol (born 1975), figure skater, World Figure Skating Championship bronze
- Gary Assous (born 1988), football player
- Jonathan Assous (born 1983), France/Israel, soccer defensive midfielder (Hapoel Ramat Gan)
- Fabrice Benichou (born 1966), boxer, World Champion, super bantamweight
- Cyril Benzaquen (born 1989), World Champion Kickboxing, World Champion Muay-thaï, light heavyweight
- Ossip Bernstein (1882–1962), Russian-born chess grandmaster
- Jean Bloch (born 1877), soccer, Olympic silver
- Ilan Boccara (born 1993), France/Netherlands, football player
- Alain Calmat (born 1940), figure skater, Olympic silver, World Championship gold, silver, two-time bronze
- François Cevert (1944–1973), racing driver (half Jewish)
- Robert Cohen (1930–2022), boxer, World Champion, bantamweight
- Stéphanie Cohen-Aloro (born 1983), tennis player
- Steven Cohen (born 1986), football player
- Pierre Darmon (born 1934), tennis player, highest world ranking #8
- René Dreyfus (1905–1993), racing driver
- Yves Dreyfus (1931–2021), épée fencer, Olympic bronze, French champion
- Johann Fauveau (born 1982), kickboxer, World Champion, welterweight
- Myriam Fox-Jerusalmi (born 1961), slalom canoer, Olympic bronze (K-1 slalom), five golds at ICF Canoe Slalom World Championships (two-time K-1, three-time K-1 team)
- Stéphane Haccoun (born 1967), boxer, featherweight, super featherweight, and junior lightweight
- Rudy Haddad (born 1985), soccer midfielder (LB Châteauroux & U21 national team)
- Alphonse Halimi (1932–2006), boxer, World Champion, bantamweight
- Maurice Herzog (1919–2012), mountaineer; first 8000 m; mountain Annapurna (1950); later a politician
- Alexandre Lippmann (1881–1960), épée fencer, two-time Olympic champion, two-time silver, bronze
- Armand Mouyal (1925–1988), épée fencer, Olympic bronze, world champion
- Alfred "Artem" Nakache (1915–1983), swimmer; world record (200-m breaststroke), one-third of French two-time world record (3x100 relay team); imprisoned by Nazis in Auschwitz, where his wife and daughter were killed
- Claude Netter (1924–2007), foil fencer, Olympic champion, silver
- Jacques Ochs (1883–1971), French-born Belgian épée, saber, and foil fencer, Olympic champion
- Kevin Pariente (born 1987), football player
- Maxime Partouche (born 1990), football player
- Victor Perez (1911–1945), Tunisian-French boxer, World Champion, flyweight; murdered in the Holocaust
- François Rozenthal (born 1975), ice hockey, France national team; brother of Maurice Rozenthal
- Maurice Rozenthal (born 1975), ice hockey, right wing, France national team
- Eric Sitruk (born 1978), football player
- Jean Stern (1875–1962), épée fencer, Olympic champion
- Daniel Wildenstein (1917–2001), racehorse owner
- Mickaël Madar (1968–), French former professional footballer

== Other ==
- Abraham of Aragon, Jewish physician specializing in diseases of the eye
- Bonet de Lattes (by 1450–after 1514), astrologer and papal physician
- Ilan Halimi (1982–2006), salesman; kidnapped, tortured, and murdered by an anti-semitic gang mistaking him for a wealthy man
- Mélanie Berger-Volle, French Resistance veteran

== See also ==
- History of the Jews in France
- List of French people
- List of West European Jews
