= Moati =

Moati is a surname. Notable people with the surname include:

- Félix Moati (born 1990), French actor, film director and screenwriter, son of Serge
- Nine Moati (1937–2021), French novelist, sister of Serge
- Serge Moati (born 1946), French journalist, television presenter, film director and writer
