= 2010–11 Süper Lig =

53rd season of top-tier Turkish football

Süper Lig
- Season: 2010–11
- Champions: Fenerbahçe; 18th title
- Relegated: Bucaspor; Konyaspor; Kasımpaşa
- Champions League: Fenerbahçe; Trabzonspor
- Europa League: Beşiktaş; Bursaspor; Gaziantepspor
- Matches: 306
- Goals: 833 (2.72 per match)
- Top goalscorer: Alex (28 goals)
- Biggest home win: Fenerbahçe 6–0 Ankaragücü (15 May 2011)
- Biggest away win: Kasımpaşa 0–7 Trabzonspor (17 October 2010)
- Highest scoring: Kasımpaşa 2–6 Fenerbahçe (27 September 2010); Bucaspor 3–5 Fenerbahçe (24 April 2011)
- Highest attendance: 51,338; Galatasaray 1–2 Fenerbahçe (18 March 2011)
- Total attendance: 4,301,748
- Average attendance: 14,058

The 2010–11 Süper Lig (known as the Spor Toto Süper Lig for sponsorship reasons) was the 53rd season since its establishment. The season began on 14 August 2010 and concluded on 22 May 2011.

Fenerbahçe claimed their 18th title, but the season was marred by the 2011 Turkish football match-fixing scandal which involved 17 Süper Lig teams and dozens of people, including club bosses and Turkish internationals.

== Teams ==
Ankaraspor, Denizlispor and Diyarbakırspor were relegated at the end of the 2009–10 season after finishing in the bottom three places of the standings; Ankaraspor were automatically relegated by the Turkish Football Federation because of the election of Ahmet Gökçek, who was already a member of the board of Ankaraspor, as chairman of Ankaragücü.

The relegated teams were replaced by 2009–10 TFF First League champions Karabükspor, runners-up Bucaspor and promotion play-off winners Konyaspor. Karabükspor returned to the Süper Lig after an 11-year absence, while Bucaspor will make its debut in the Süper Lig after two successive promotions, becoming İzmir's first representation in the top-flight in seven years. Konyaspor made their immediate return to the Süper Lig after being relegated at the end of the 2008–09 season.

In further changes, Antalyaspor were renamed Medical Park Antalyaspor after accepting a sponsorship deal with Medical Park Hospitals Group on 20 July 2010.

=== Overview ===
Location of (qualified) teams in Süper Lig 2010–11

Team	Home stadium	Head coach	Captain	Kit manufacturer	Shirt Sponsor
Ankaragücü	19 Mayıs (Ankara)	(Turkey) Ümit Özat	(Turkey) Hürriyet Güçer	Lotto	MKE
Antalyaspor	Akdeniz University Stadium	(Turkey) Mehmet Özdilek	(Turkey) Necati Ateş	Puma	SunExpress
Beşiktaş	BJK İnönü Stadium	(Turkey) Tayfur Havutçu	(Turkey) İbrahim Toraman	Adidas	Cola Turka
Bucaspor	Buca Arena	(Turkey) Sait Karafırtınalar	(Turkey) Musa Aydın	Lotto	Metro İzmir
Bursaspor	Bursa Atatürk Stadium	(Turkey) Ertuğrul Sağlam	(Turkey) Ömer Erdoğan	Puma	Digiturk
Eskişehirspor	Eskişehir Atatürk Stadium	(Turkey) Bülent Uygun	(Turkey) Sezgin Coşkun	Nike	ETI
Fenerbahçe	Şükrü Saracoğlu	(Turkey) Aykut Kocaman	(Brazil) Alex	Adidas	Avea
Galatasaray	Türk Telekom Arena	(Turkey) Bülent Ünder	(Turkey) Arda Turan	Adidas	Türk Telekom
Gaziantepspor	Kamil Ocak	(Turkey) Tolunay Kafkas	(Turkey) Emre Güngör	Adidas	TürkOil
Gençlerbirliği	19 Mayıs (Ankara)	(Germany) Ralf Zumdick	(Turkey) Cem Can	Lotto	Caprice Gold
İstanbul B.B.	Atatürk Olympic Stadium	(Turkey) Abdullah Avcı	(Turkey) Efe İnanç	Nike	Medical Park
Karabükspor	Yenişehir	(Turkey) Yücel İldiz	(Turkey) Fatih Ceylan	Lescon	Kardemir
Kasımpaşa	Recep Tayyip Erdoğan	(Turkey) Fuat Çapa	(Turkey) Murat Şahin	Lescon	Kasımpaşa 90th Year
Kayserispor	Kadir Has	(Georgia (country)) Shota Arveladze	(Turkey) Mehmet Eren Boyraz	Adidas	Aksa
Konyaspor	Konya Atatürk Stadium	(Turkey) Yılmaz Vural	(Turkey) Emre Toraman	Lotto	Torku
Manisaspor	19 Mayıs (Manisa)	(Turkey) Hikmet Karaman	(Turkey) İlker Avcıbay	Lescon	Vestel
Sivasspor	4 Eylül	(Turkey) Rıza Çalımbay	(Turkey) Mehmet Yıldız	Adidas	Türk Kızılayı
Trabzonspor	Hüseyin Avni Aker	(Turkey) Şenol Güneş	(Turkey) İbrahim Yattara	Nike	Türk Telekom

=== Managerial changes ===
Team	Outgoing manager	Manner of departure	Date of vacancy	Replaced by	Date of appointment
Ankaragücü	(France) Roger Lemerre	Mutual consent	23 May 2010	(Turkey) Ümit Özat	24 May 2010
Beşiktaş	(Turkey) Mustafa Denizli	Retired	2 June 2010	(Germany) Bernd Schuster	10 June 2010
Fenerbahçe	(Germany) Christoph Daum	Sacked	25 June 2010	(Turkey) Aykut Kocaman	26 June 2010
Manisaspor	(Turkey) Hakan Kutlu	Resigned	12 September 2010	(Turkey) Hikmet Karaman	13 September 2010
Eskişehirspor	(Turkey) Rıza Çalımbay	Sacked	27 September 2010	(Turkey) Bülent Uygun	6 October 2010
Bucaspor	(Turkey) Bülent Uygun	Resigned	4 October 2010	(Turkey) Samet Aybaba	7 October 2010
Galatasaray	(Netherlands) Frank Rijkaard	Mutual consent	20 October 2010	(Romania) Gheorghe Hagi	22 October 2010
Gençlerbirliği	(Germany) Thomas Doll	Mutual consent	21 October 2010	(Germany) Ralf Zumdick	21 October 2010
Sivasspor	(Turkey) Mesut Bakkal	Sacked	23 October 2010	(Turkey) Rıza Çalımbay	24 October 2010
Kasımpaşa	(Turkey) Yılmaz Vural	Retired	27 December 2010	(Turkey) Fuat Çapa	27 December 2010
Konyaspor	(Turkey) Ziya Doğan	Resigned	14 February 2011	(Turkey) Yılmaz Vural	15 February 2011
Ankaragücü	(Turkey) Ümit Özat	Resigned	26 February 2011	(Turkey) Mesut Bakkal	28 February 2011
Beşiktaş	(Germany) Bernd Schuster	Resigned	15 March 2011	(Turkey) Tayfur Havutçu	15 March 2011
Bucaspor	(Turkey) Samet Aybaba	Resigned	8 April 2011	(Turkey) Sait Karafırtınalar	

=== Foreign players ===
Club	Player 1	Player 2	Player 3	Player 4	Player 5	Player 6	Player 7	Player 8	Player 9	Player 10	Former Players
Ankaragücü	(Croatia) Drago Gabrić	(Czech Republic) Jan Rajnoch	(Czech Republic) Roman Bednář	(Slovakia) Marek Sapara	(Slovakia) Róbert Vittek	(Slovakia) Štefan Senecký	(Slovakia) Stanislav Šesták				(Canada) Michael Klukowski (Gabon) Roguy Méyé (Liberia) Theo Lewis Weeks (Poland) Michał Żewłakow
Antalyaspor	(Bosnia and Herzegovina) Ivan Radeljić	(Brazil) Tita	(Cameroon) Sammy Ndjock	(Ivory Coast) Serge Djiéhoua	(Tunisia) Ali Zitouni						(France) Grégory Proment
Beşiktaş	(Brazil) Bobô	(Czech Republic) Tomáš Sivok	(Germany) Fabian Ernst	(Germany) Roberto Hilbert	(Italy) Matteo Ferrari	(Portugal) Hugo Almeida	(Portugal) Manuel Fernandes	(Portugal) Ricardo Quaresma	(Portugal) Simão	(Spain) Guti	(Argentina) Matías Delgado (Brazil) Rodrigo Tabata (Czech Republic) Tomáš Zápotočný (Germany) Michael Fink (Slovakia) Filip Hološko
Bucaspor	(Angola) Carlos Fernandes	(Brazil) Beto	(Brazil) Leandrão	(Croatia) Jerko Leko	(Democratic Republic of the Congo) Landry Mulemo	(Estonia) Pavel Londak	(France) Kevin Parienté	(Ghana) Torric Jebrin	(Senegal) Victor Mendy		(Algeria) Mohamed Dahmane (Angola) Manucho (Cape Verde) Dady (Croatia) Stjepan Tomas
Bursaspor	(Argentina) Federico Insúa	(Argentina) Pablo Batalla	(Bulgaria) Dimitar Ivankov	(Romania) Giani Kiriță	(Scotland) Kenny Miller	(Serbia) Ivan Ergić	(Serbia) Milan Stepanov	(Sweden) Gustav Svensson	(United States) Jozy Altidore		(Argentina) Damián Steinert (Argentina) Leonel Núñez
Eskişehirspor	(Bosnia and Herzegovina) Safet Nadarević	(Brazil) Diego Ângelo	(Chile) Rodrigo Tello	(Croatia) Vanja Iveša	(Portugal) Pelé						(Azerbaijan) Rashad Sadygov (Bahrain) Jojo (Croatia) Luka Vučko (North Macedonia) Agim Ibraimi
Fenerbahçe	(Brazil) Alex	(Brazil) André Santos	(Brazil) Cristian	(Brazil) Fábio Bilica	(Nigeria) Joseph Yobo	(Senegal) Issiar Dia	(Senegal) Mamadou Niang	(Slovakia) Miroslav Stoch	(Spain) Dani Güiza	(Uruguay) Diego Lugano	
Galatasaray	(Albania) Lorik Cana	(Argentina) Emiliano Insúa	(Argentina) Emmanuel Culio	(Australia) Harry Kewell	(Australia) Lucas Neill	(Colombia) Juan Pablo Pino	(Colombia) Róbinson Zapata	(Czech Republic) Milan Baroš	(Romania) Bogdan Stancu		(Bosnia and Herzegovina) Zvjezdan Misimović (Brazil) Elano
Gaziantepspor	(Argentina) Christian Zurita	(Argentina) Ismael Sosa	(Brazil) Ivan	(Brazil) Júlio César	(Brazil) Jorginho	(Brazil) Wágner	(Bulgaria) Ivelin Popov	(Cameroon) Dany Nounkeu	(Lithuania) Žydrūnas Karčemarskas		(Brazil) Beto
Gençlerbirliği	(Albania) Debatik Curri	(Australia) Mile Jedinak	(Bosnia and Herzegovina) Ermin Zec	(Costa Rica) Randall Azofeifa	(Croatia) Ante Kulušić	(Democratic Republic of the Congo) Joachim Mununga	(Sweden) Labinot Harbuzi	(Togo) Franck Mawuena			(Albania) Bekim Balaj (Democratic Republic of the Congo) Patiyo Tambwe (New Zealand) Shane Smeltz (Scotland) Michael Stewart
İstanbul B.B.	(Bosnia and Herzegovina) Kenan Hasagić	(Brazil) Marcus Vinícius	(Brazil) Marquinhos	(Cameroon) Hervé Tum	(Poland) Marcin Kuś	(Slovakia) Filip Hološko	(Sweden) Samuel Holmén				
Karabükspor	(Brazil) Dyego Coelho	(Brazil) Tozo	(Bulgaria) Emil Angelov	(Cameroon) Armand Deumi	(Croatia) Anthony Šerić	(Croatia) Vjekoslav Tomić	(Nigeria) Emmanuel Emenike	(Romania) Florin Cernat	(Tunisia) Hocine Ragued		
Kasımpaşa	(Brazil) Luiz Henrique	(Bulgaria) Georgi Sarmov	(Bulgaria) Nikolay Dimitrov	(Cameroon) Gustave Bebbe	(Chile) Juan Robledo	(Denmark) Christian Keller	(Ghana) Abdul Rahim Sebah	(Namibia) Razundara Tjikuzu	(Nigeria) Michael Ikem Anwuli	(Spain) Fernando Varela	
Kayserispor	(Algeria) Karim Ziani	(Argentina) Franco Cángele	(Australia) James Troisi	(Brazil) André Moritz	(Cameroon) Souleymanou Hamidou	(Morocco) Nordin Amrabat	(Paraguay) Jonathan Santana	(Sweden) Emir Kujović			(Georgia (country)) Aleksandre Amisulashvili (Uruguay) Marcelo Zalayeta
Konyaspor	(Bosnia and Herzegovina) Muamer Salibašić	(Burkina Faso) Mahamoudou Kéré	(Colombia) Johnnier Montaño	(Czech Republic) Martin Klein	(Guinea) Kamil Zayatte	(Iraq) Bassim Abbas	(Poland) Marcin Robak	(Poland) Mariusz Pawełek	(Slovakia) Peter Grajciar	(Spain) Álvaro Mejía	(Czech Republic) Bořek Dočkal (Equatorial Guinea) Thierry Fidjeu (Guinea) Ibrahima Bangoura (Guinea) Kanfory Sylla (Slovakia) Ivan Lietava
Manisaspor	(Angola) Manucho	(Brazil) Gabriel	(Brazil) Kahê	(Cameroon) Jacques Momha	(Canada) Josh Simpson	(Guinea) Oumar Kalabane	(Liberia) Jimmy Dixon	(Nigeria) Isaac Promise	(Poland) Maciej Iwański	(Portugal) Makukula	(Romania) Nicolae Dică
Sivasspor	(Bolivia) Ricardo Pedriel	(Brazil) Sandro	(Czech Republic) Jakub Navrátil	(Czech Republic) Tomáš Rada	(France) Yannick Kamanan	(Latvia) Deniss Ivanovs	(Mali) Souleymane Keïta	(Nigeria) Michael Eneramo	(Slovakia) Ľuboš Kamenár	(Poland) Kamil Grosicki	(Cameroon) Alioum Saidou (Gabon) Bruno Mbanangoyé (Germany) Sead Ramović (Guinea) Mamadou Diallo
Trabzonspor	(Argentina) Gustavo Colman	(Brazil) Alanzinho	(Brazil) Jajá	(Croatia) Hrvoje Čale	(Poland) Arkadiusz Głowacki	(Poland) Paweł Brożek	(Poland) Piotr Brożek				(Burundi) Faty Papy (Colombia) Teófilo Gutiérrez

== League table ==
Pos	Team	Pld	W	D	L	GF	GA	GD	Pts	Qualification or relegation
1	Fenerbahçe (C)	34	26	4	4	84	34	+50	82	
2	Trabzonspor	34	25	7	2	69	23	+46	82	Qualification to Champions League group stage (Note: Originally, Fenerbahçe qualified for the group stage and Trabzonspor qualified for the third qualifying round. Despite being eliminated in the third qualifying round and passed to the UEFA Europa League play-off round, Trabzonspor replaced Fenerbahçe after the Turkish Football Federation withdrew Fenerbahçe from the UEFA Champions League one day before the group stage draw due to match-fixing allegations. UEFA would then select Trabzonspor as their replacement.)
3	Bursaspor	34	17	10	7	50	29	+21	61	Qualification to Europa League third qualifying round
4	Gaziantepspor	34	17	8	9	44	33	+11	59	Qualification to Europa League second qualifying round
5	Beşiktaş	34	15	9	10	53	36	+17	54	Qualification to Europa League play-off round (Note: Beşiktaş have won the 2010–11 Turkish Cup competition and thus are qualified for the play-off round of the UEFA Europa League.)
6	Kayserispor	34	14	9	11	46	44	+2	51	
7	Eskişehirspor	34	12	11	11	41	40	+1	47	
8	Galatasaray	34	14	4	16	41	46	−5	46	
9	Kardemir Karabükspor	34	12	8	14	46	53	−7	44	
10	Manisaspor	34	13	4	17	49	52	−3	43	
11	Antalyaspor	34	10	12	12	41	48	−7	42 (Note: Antalyaspor were ahead of Sivasspor on head-to-head record: Antalyaspor–İstanbul B.B. 1–0, İstanbul B.B.–Antalyaspor 1–1.)	
12	İstanbul B.B.	34	12	6	16	40	45	−5	42	
13	MKE Ankaragücü	34	10	11	13	52	62	−10	41	
14	Gençlerbirliği	34	10	10	14	43	51	−8	40	
15	Sivasspor	34	8	11	15	43	57	−14	35	
16	Bucaspor (R)	34	6	8	20	37	65	−28	26	Relegation to 2011–12 TFF First League
17	Konyaspor (R)	34	4	12	18	28	49	−21	24	Relegation to 2011–12 TFF First League
18	Kasımpaşa (R)	34	5	8	21	31	71	−40	23	Relegation to 2011–12 TFF First League

Source: tff.org (in Turkish)
Rules for classification: 1) points; 2) goal difference; 3) number of goals scored.
(C) Champions; (R) Relegated

=== Positions by round ===
Team ╲ Round	1	2	3	4	5	6	7	8	9	10	11	12	13	14	15	16	17	18	19	20	21	22	23	24	25	26	27	28	29	30	31	32	33	34
Fenerbahçe	1	5	4	5	9	6	4	4	4	4	4	5	4	4	3	3	3	3	3	3	2	2	1	1	1	1	2	2	2	1	1	1	1	1
Trabzonspor	3	1	2	2	2	4	2	2	2	2	1	1	1	1	1	1	1	1	1	1	1	1	2	2	2	2	1	1	1	2	2	2	2	2
Bursaspor	6	2	1	1	1	1	1	1	1	1	2	3	2	2	2	2	2	2	2	2	3	3	3	3	3	3	3	3	3	3	3	3	3	3
Gaziantepspor	10	11	11	15	15	12	12	11	12	12	10	9	7	8	10	8	7	6	8	6	5	5	5	5	5	4	4	4	4	4	4	4	4	4
Beşiktaş	7	10	5	4	3	2	5	7	7	6	8	6	6	5	5	5	5	5	5	5	6	6	6	6	7	7	7	6	5	5	5	5	5	5
Kayserispor	2	3	3	3	4	5	3	3	3	3	3	2	3	3	4	4	4	4	4	4	4	4	4	4	4	5	5	5	7	7	6	6	6	6
Eskişehirspor	8	14	17	17	17	17	17	15	14	14	14	14	14	12	13	12	11	8	6	9	9	7	8	7	6	6	6	7	6	6	7	7	7	7
Galatasaray	13	17	12	7	7	3	7	9	9	8	9	10	10	10	9	10	9	7	10	8	10	8	10	11	11	11	13	14	13	12	14	12	9	8
Kardemir Karabükspor	4	9	13	8	6	7	6	5	6	9	7	8	9	7	8	6	6	10	11	11	11	11	9	10	10	10	9	9	9	9	8	10	8	9
Manisaspor	12	18	18	18	16	14	14	12	11	11	12	12	12	13	11	13	12	9	7	10	7	9	11	9	8	8	10	10	11	13	11	13	10	10
Antalyaspor	18	16	16	12	8	9	8	6	5	5	6	7	8	9	7	9	10	12	12	12	13	13	14	13	13	13	12	11	10	11	12	14	14	11
İstanbul B.B.	16	8	6	6	5	8	10	10	10	7	5	4	5	6	6	7	8	11	9	7	8	10	7	8	9	9	8	8	8	8	10	9	12	12
MKE Ankaragücü	17	6	7	13	10	11	9	8	8	10	11	11	11	11	12	11	13	13	13	13	12	12	13	12	12	12	11	13	12	10	9	8	11	13
Gençlerbirliği	9	12	14	11	12	10	11	13	13	13	13	13	13	14	15	14	14	14	14	14	14	14	12	14	14	14	14	12	14	14	13	11	13	14
Sivasspor	5	4	10	14	14	16	16	17	16	16	17	17	16	17	16	15	15	16	15	15	16	17	15	15	15	15	15	15	15	15	15	15	15	15
Bucaspor	15	15	8	9	11	15	13	14	15	15	16	16	17	16	17	17	17	17	17	17	15	15	16	16	16	16	16	16	16	16	16	16	16	16
Konyaspor	14	7	9	10	13	13	15	16	17	17	15	15	15	15	14	16	16	15	16	16	17	16	17	17	17	17	18	18	17	17	17	17	17	17
Kasımpaşa	11	13	15	16	18	18	18	18	18	18	18	18	18	18	18	18	18	18	18	18	18	18	18	18	18	18	17	17	18	18	18	18	18	18

Source: tff.org (in Turkish)

== Results ==
Home \ Away	MKE	ANT	BEŞ	BUC	BUR	ESK	FEN	GAL	GAZ	GEN	İBB	KRB	KSM	KAY	KON	MAN	SİV	TRA
MKE Ankaragücü		2–3	1–0	5–3	1–5	2–2	2–1	3–2	0–2	2–4	2–2	0–0	3–0	1–1	4–1	1–3	1–1	0–2
Antalyaspor	2–2		0–2	3–3	2–2	2–2	0–1	3–0	0–1	0–0	1–0	1–2	3–1	2–1	1–0	1–4	1–1	0–0
Beşiktaş	4–0	2–1		5–1	1–0	3–1	2–4	2–0	1–1	2–2	0–2	1–1	1–1	4–2	2–2	2–3	2–1	1–2
Bucaspor	0–0	1–0	0–1		0–2	0–0	3–5	0–1	2–1	3–1	0–2	2–1	4–0	3–3	3–2	1–1	0–4	1–2
Bursaspor	0–0	2–3	0–3 (Note: Beşiktaş were awarded a 3–0 win because of the events before the match in Bursa.)	1–0		2–1	1–1	2–0	1–4	1–0	1–1	2–2	2–1	2–0	1–0	2–1	2–1	0–2
Eskişehirspor	0–0	0–0	2–0	1–0	1–1		1–3	1–3	0–1	0–0	1–0	1–0	4–0	1–2	1–0	2–1	2–1	0–0
Fenerbahçe	6–0	4–0	1–1	5–2	0–0	4–2		0–0	1–0	3–0	2–0	2–1	2–0	2–0	2–0	4–2	1–0	2–0
Galatasaray	2–4	2–1	1–2	1–0	0–2	4–2	1–2		1–0	0–2	3–1	0–0	3–1	1–1	2–0	0–2	1–0	0–1
Gaziantepspor	3–2	2–1	0–0	2–0	0–3 (Note: Bursaspor were awarded a 3–0 win after the original match was abandoned due to crowd trouble after 62 minutes, with Bursaspor leading 1–0.)	2–1	2–1	1–0		1–1	4–1	0–0	0–0	2–0	2–2	1–0	3–1	1–3
Gençlerbirliği	1–0	2–3	0–2	1–0	1–5	0–1	2–4	2–3	0–0		2–1	2–3	1–1	4–1	2–1	2–0	1–1	1–2
İstanbul B.B.	1–4	1–1	2–1	2–1	0–0	0–2	0–1	3–1	1–0	0–1		2–1	3–1	0–2	1–0	0–0	1–2	1–3
Kardemir Karabükspor	5–1	2–0	1–4	3–0	1–1	1–2	0–1	2–1	3–2	3–0	0–2		1–3	0–0	2–1	2–1	2–1	0–4
Kasımpaşa	2–1	2–3	0–1	0–0	0–3	0–2	2–6	0–3	0–1	1–1	1–3	1–2		1–2	2–2	1–0	2–0	0–7
Kayserispor	2–1	2–0	1–0	2–0	1–0	2–2	2–0	0–0	1–2	1–1	3–2	1–0	1–3		1–3	1–2	4–1	0–0
Konyaspor	0–2	0–0	1–1	1–1	0–0	2–1	1–4	0–1	0–2	2–1	0–0	2–2	2–2	0–1		0–0	1–1	1–2
Manisaspor	0–3	1–2	0–0	4–2	0–2	3–1	1–3	2–3	2–0	0–3	1–0	4–2	2–1	0–2	0–1		3–0	1–2
Sivasspor	1–1	1–1	1–0	1–1	0–2	1–1	3–4	2–1	1–1	1–1	0–4	5–1	1–1	1–0	1–0	4–2		2–3
Trabzonspor	1–1	0–0	1–0	2–0	1–0	0–0	3–2	2–0	3–0	3–1	3–1	3–0	1–0	3–3	1–0	1–3	6–1	

Source: tff.org (in Turkish)
Legend: Blue = home team win; Yellow = draw; Red = away team win.

== Top goalscorers ==
Source: Soccerway

Rank	Scorer	Club	Goals
1	(Brazil) Alex	Fenerbahçe	28
2	(Turkey) Burak Yılmaz	Trabzonspor	19
3	(Senegal) Mamadou Niang	Fenerbahçe	15
4	(Nigeria) Emmanuel Emenike	Karabükspor	14
5	(Turkey) Necati Ateş	Antalyaspor	13
5	(Turkey) Umut Bulut	Trabzonspor	13
7	(Turkey) Olcan Adın	Gaziantepspor	12
7	(Brazil) Jajá	Trabzonspor	12
7	(Canada) Josh Simpson	Manisaspor	12
10	(Brazil) Kahê	Manisaspor	10
10	(Turkey) Semih Şentürk	Fenerbahçe	10
10	(Slovakia) Stanislav Šesták	Ankaragücü	10
10	(Brazil) Tita	Antalyaspor	10
10	(Turkey) Cenk Tosun	Gaziantepspor	10

=== Hat-tricks ===
Player	For	Against	Result	Date
(Canada) Joshua Simpson	Manisaspor	Sivasspor	3–0	26 September 2010
(Czech Republic) Milan Baroš	Galatasaray	İstanbul BB	3–1	26 September 2010
(Senegal) Mamadou Niang	Fenerbahçe	Kasımpaşa	6–2	27 September 2010
(Nigeria) Emmanuel Emenike	Kardemir Karabükspor	Bucaspor	3–0	6 November 2010
(Brazil) Alex	Fenerbahçe	Bucaspor	5–2	22 November 2010
(Bolivia) Ricardo Pedriel	Sivasspor	Kardemir Karabükspor	5–1	22 November 2010
(Brazil) Alex	Fenerbahçe	Beşiktaş	4–2	20 February 2011
(Poland) Kamil Grosicki	Sivasspor	Manisaspor	4–2	27 February 2011
(Slovakia) Stanislav Šesták	Ankaragücü	Galatasaray	3–2	13 March 2011
(Turkey) Olcan Adın	Gaziantepspor	İstanbul BB	4–1	19 March 2011
(Brazil) Alex	Fenerbahçe	Ankaragücü	6–0	15 May 2011
(Turkey) Serdar Özbayraktar	Eskişehirspor	Kasımpaşa	4–0	22 May 2011
