= Karmi =

Karmi may refer to:

- Karmi (beer), a Polish brand of beers
- Karmi, Cyprus, a village in Cyprus
- Spelling variant of Carmi (name)
