= Carmi (name) =

Carmi is a surname and a given name. It may be of Hebrew origin: Hebrew: כרמי and is sometimes transliterated as Karmi. Notable people with the name include:

== Hebrew ==
- Carmi Gillon, Israeli politician
- Ayelet Carmi, Israeli painter and installation artist
- Daniella Carmi, Israeli writer
- Boris Carmi, Russian-born Israeli photographer
- Israel Carmi, founder of the Tilhas Tizig Gesheften (TTG Brigade)
- Dov Karmi, architect of Mandate Palestine and Israel
- Lior Karmi, Israeli canoeist
- Mordecai Karmi (1749–1825), French rabbi
- Rhea Carmi, Israeli American abstract expressionist and mixed-media artist
- Ram Karmi, Israeli architect
- Rivka Carmi (born 1948), Israeli pediatrician, geneticist, and President of Ben-Gurion University of the Negev
- T. Carmi, literary pseudonym of Carmi Charney, an American-born Israeli poet

== Other ==
- Carmi le Roux, South African cricketer
- Carmi Martin, Carmita Martin, Filipina actress, model, and comedian
- Carmi Schooler, American social psychologist
- Carmi Thompson, American attorney and Republican politician
- Carmi W. Beach, American merchant, Republican politician, and Wisconsin pioneer
- Eugenio Carmi, Italian painter and sculptor
- Lisetta Carmi, Italian photographer
- Maria Carmi, stage name of Italian actress Norina Matchabelli (1880–1957)
- Vera Carmi, Italian film actress
