= Carmi =

Carmi is a biblical name and may also refer to:

- Carmi (name), a surname and given name
- Carmi, Illinois, in White County, Illinois, United States
  - Carmi-White County High School, a high school in Carmi
  - Carmi Air Force Station, a closed United States Air Force General Surveillance Radar station
- Carmi, British Columbia, a locality in the South Okanagan region of British Columbia, Canada
  - Carmi Creek, a tributary of the West Kettle River in British Columbia, Canada
  - Carmi Mine, the namesake of the locality and creek, named after Carmi, Illinois
