= Benjamin ben Zerah =

11th-century Jewish liturgical poet

Benjamin ben Zerah (Hebrew: בנימין בן זרח) was a payyetan (Jewish liturgical poet) who lived in southeastern Europe in the middle of the eleventh century. He is called by the later payyetanim "the Great," and also "Ba'al Shem" (Master of the Name), on account of the numerous names of God and angels used by him in his piyyutim. He wrote 15 poems ("yozerot") for the Sabbaths preceding the feasts, and 40 selichot, published in the Machzor of the German rite.

His piyyutim have an easy, elegant style. Parallels with Eleazar beRabbi Qallir are frequent. Judging from his selichah אנא ה' האל ("I beseech thee, Lord God") – in which he plays on the name of God – consisting of 22 letters, and his "ofan," in which he gives the names of angels, Benjamin was inclined to mysticism.

It is doubtful whether certain liturgies containing "Benjamin" in acrostic are to be attributed to him or to his older contemporary, Benjamin ben Samuel.
