= Jonathan Assous =

French-Israeli footballer (born 1983)

Jonathan Assous יונתן אסוס
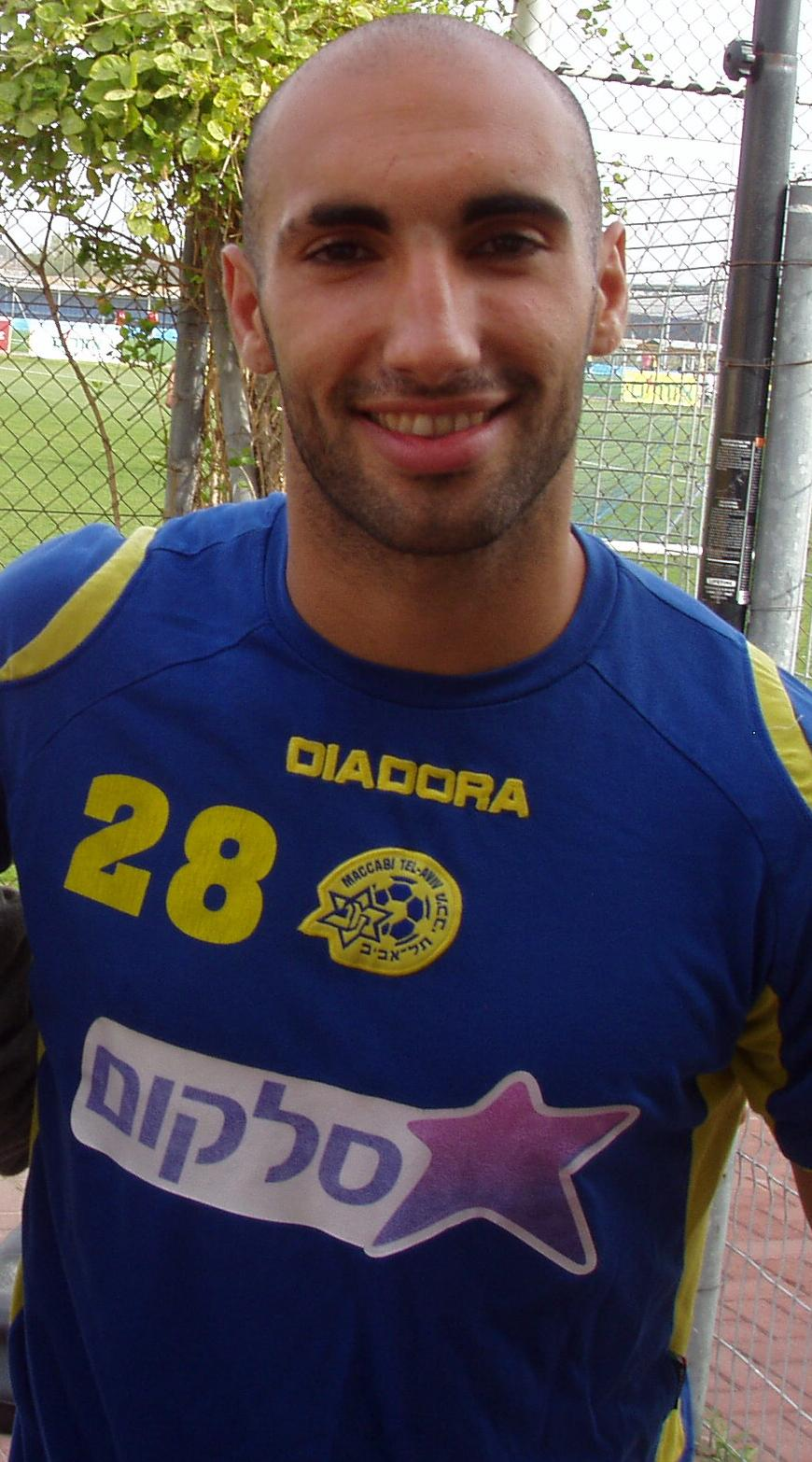

Personal information
- Full name: Jonathan Victor Gerard Assous
- Date of birth: September 2, 1983 (age 43)
- Place of birth: Sarcelles, France
- Height: 1.77 m (5 ft 10 in)
- Position: Defensive midfielder

Senior career*
Years	Team	Apps	(Gls)
2001–2003	AS Nancy	7	(0)
2003–2004	Nîmes	21	(0)
2004–2006	Angers	22	(0)
2006–2007	Cannes	6	(0)
2007	Créteil	15	(1)
2007–2008	Reims	17	(1)
2008–2009	Maccabi Tel Aviv	34	(1)
2009	Hapoel Petah Tikva	43	(2)
2010	Hapoel Ramat Gan	10	(0)
2010–2013	Hapoel Petah Tikva	90	(2)
2013	Hapoel Ashkelon	13	(1)
2013–2014	Maccabi Ahi Nazareth	6	(0)
2015	Beitar Ramat Gan	0	(0)
2016–2018	Sporting Tel Aviv	17	(1)
- * Club domestic league appearances and goals

Jonathan Victor Gerard Assous (Hebrew: יונתן אסוס; born September 2, 1983) is a French-Israeli former professional footballer who played as a defensive midfielder. In France, Assous was widely known for his temper and rough play.

== Career ==
Assous began his professional career in the Ligue 2 with club AS Nancy. Sparingly making a league appearance, he moved down to the Championnat National to play with Nîmes. Fine performances in the Championnat earned him a contract with Angers. There he grabbed headlines for his rough play which got him ejected on numerous occasions. During his stint with Créteil, he trialed with Nice and impressed then-manager Frédéric Antonetti. Unfortunately, contractual problems with Créteil ended his chance of making it to Ligue 1 for the first time in his career. Instead, Assous joined Reims where he was able to carve out a spot in the starting 11.

After the successful acclimation of French midfielder Rudy Haddad to life in Israel, Maccabi decided to look for more Jewish footballers who would not count against the foreign player cap. Frenchman Kevin Pariente and Americans Benny Feilhaber and Jonathan Bornstein were originally scouted for the club. After Maccabi could not come to terms with their respective clubs, they turned to Assous who was having a good season in France. Some fans were vocally opposed to signing Assous because of his previously unsuccessful trial with Hapoel Kfar Saba and lack of "star quality".

Immediately after being bought, Assous went to the Jewish Agency offices in Paris to fill out all necessary forms for receiving Israeli citizenship under the Law of Return.

In 2008, he was joined in Israel by his brother, Gary who signed with Maccabi Netanya.

From 2009 to 2011, he was playing for Hapoel Petah Tikva.

In January 2011, he joined Hapoel Ramat Gan but the club had been relegated to Liga Leumit, so he did not want to continue in this team.

In August 2011, he joined for a second Time Hapoel Petah Tikva, club where he is liked by all ultras, for his temper, and his aggressive style of play. In May 2012, Hapoel Petah Tikva was relegated to Liga Leumit, but Assous decided to continue with the club, and to sign a 3 years contract, in August 2012.

In October 2014, he joined Liga Gimel club, Shimshon Tel Aviv.

== See also ==
- List of select Jewish football (association; soccer) players
