= Gary Assous =

French-Israeli professional footballer (born 1988)

Gary Assous גרי אסוס
Personal information
- Full name: Gary Meir Mordechai Assous גרי מאיר מרדכי אסוס
- Date of birth: 4 March 1988 (age 38)
- Place of birth: Sarcelles, France
- Position: Midfielder

Youth career
- Paris Saint-Germain
- AC Ajaccio
- AS Cannes
- Maccabi Netanya

Senior career*
Years	Team	Apps	(Gls)
2008–2009	Maccabi Herzliya	1	(0)
2009–2010	Hapoel Jerusalem	16	(0)
2010–2011	Maccabi Be'er Sheva	11	(0)
2011–2012	Hapoel Katamon Jerusalem	19	(0)
2012	Maccabi Ironi Bat Yam	1	(0)
- * Club domestic league appearances and goals as of 19:53, 17 December 2010 (UTC)

Gary Meir Mordechai Assous (Hebrew: גרי מאיר מרדכי אסוס; born 4 March 1988) is a French-Israeli professional footballer. He is currently contracted with Hapoel Katamon Jerusalem.

== Biography ==
Gary grew up in France in a Jewish family along with his brother Jonathan. Gary originally was part of the youth system of Paris Saint-Germain before he sustained a major injury. He continued through the youth ranks of AC Ajaccio before moving down to then Championnat club, AS Cannes.

=== Arrival to Israel ===
Assous arrived in Israel after his brother spent a season with Maccabi Tel Aviv and joined the Maccabi Netanya youth team for a trial. After impressing during a training match between the youth and full teams, Assous was signed by Netanya to a three-year contract starting at $40,000 a year. Within a short time of Lothar Matthäus's arrival to Maccabi Netanya, he decided to release Assous from his contract without even seeing Assous in training.

After being released by Netanya, Assous trialled with Maccabi Ahi Nazareth.

== Statistics ==
Club performance			League		Cup		League Cup		Continental		Total	
Season	Club	League	Apps	Goals	Apps	Goals	Apps	Goals	Apps	Goals	Apps	Goals
Israel			League		Israel State Cup		Toto Cup		Europe		Total	
2008–2009	Maccabi Herzliya	Liga Leumit	1	0	0	0	2	0	0	0	3	0
2009–2010	Hapoel Jerusalem	Liga Leumit	16	0	0	0	2	0	0	0	18	0
2010–2011	Maccabi Be'er Sheva	Liga Leumit	11	0	0	0	2	0	0	0	13	0
Total	Israel		28	0	0	0	6	0	0	0	34	0
Career total			28	0	0	0	6	0	0	0	34	0

== See also ==
- List of select Jewish football (association; soccer) players
