= Les Belles de Tunis =

Les Belles de Tunis is a novel by Nine Moati, first published in 1983 by Éditions du Seuil.

The book retraces the live of a Tunisian Jewish family in Tunis from 1856 to the Tunisian independence. It is also a description of 100 years of Jewish life in Tunisia. Furthermore, in the book, you find autobiographical traces of the Moati family, mainly of Serge Moati pére. The author of the book, Nine Moati, is the sister of the French artist Serge Moati fils (son).

In 2004, a special pocket version of the book was edited by the Editions Cérès (ISBN 978-9973-19-418-3) for the Tunisian lectureship (in French). This edition contains a special preface by Nine Moati for the Tunisian public.

Les Belles de Tunis is considered as one of the most successful books of Nine Moati. As of (18.8.2007) there is no English translation of the book. An Arabic translation of Les Belles de Tunis is in preparation but is not currently available.
