= Alter Mojze Goldman =

Polish Jew and member of the French Résistance during World War II

Alter Mojze Goldman

Alter Mojze Goldman (17 November 1909 – 1988) was a Polish-born French member of the French Résistance during World War II.

He was born in Lublin to a well-to-do Polish-Jewish family. After his father passing, he fled Poland after due to antisemitic discrimination. Alter emigrated briefly to Germany at some point during the 1920s before relocating to France. After relocating, he worked as a miner before joining the Chasseurs d'Afrique in Algeria and obtained French citizenship in 1930. Alter, a communist, felt disillusioned by the assassination of Leon Trotsky and the excesses of Joseph Stalin.

In 1939, he was mobilized in the French military and was decorated. After which he went south to the unoccupied part of France (Lyon), where he joined the FTP-MOI Comintern-directed Resistance movement, which was mostly composed of immigrants. His unit was involved in urban sabotage efforts.

In Lyon, he met Janine Sochaczewska. The couple had a son, Pierre Goldman (although they were not married) they separated in 1944. Sochaczewska returned to Poland in 1947 with help from some former wartime comrades. Alter abducted Pierre so that he would not grow up in the country that had seen the elimination of so many Jews.

In June 1949, Alter met and married Ruth Ambrunn (b. 1922) another Résistance fighter of German-Jewish origin (born in Munich). Pierre was then legitimized as their son. The marriage had three children: a daughter, Evelyne, and two sons, Jean-Jacques Goldman, the pop singer, and Robert Goldman, a songwriter.

Goldman was elected to the Légion d'Honneur on 19 November 1988 for his role in the Résistance. Barely a month later, he passed on at the age of seventy-nine.
