= Maquis de Vabre =

French Resistance organization

The Maquis de Vabre were an organisation of French Resistance fighters in the east of the Tarn department during the Second World War, which was gradually built up by local militants. They were officially recognised in December 1943, affiliated to the Armée secrète under the name Maquis Pol Roux (its original organiser, Guy de Rouville, had the codename Pol Roux.)

Approximately 450 maquis fighters were enrolled, organised, trained and armed in anticipation of the allied landings.

Within the framework of the Mouvements unis de la Résistance, the Maquis de Vabre became the Corps franc de la libération no. 10, before joining the French forces of the interior.

The Maquis de Vabre were structured as three companies, including the compagnie Marc Haguenau which was mainly composed of Jewish fugitive fighters from Tarn. The Jewish scouting organisation Éclaireurs israëlites de France, created by Robert Gamzon, joined the Protestant scouting organisation Éclaireurs unionistes to form this mountain maquis who participated in the liberation of Castres under the banner of the French forces of the interior, taking 4,500 German prisoners. They then joined the French First Army of General Jean de Lattre de Tassigny.

== Territory ==
The maquis de Vabre ranged across 38 communes, from the west of Montredon-Labessonnié to the eastern tip of Tarn, beyond Murat-sur-Vèbre.
