= Rhea Carmi =

American artist

- ברוריה כרמי
- Born: Bruria Even-Chen (Hebrew: ברוריה אבן-חן); April 3, 1942; Jerusalem, Mandatory Palestine
- Education: Tel-Aviv University, Tel-Aviv
- Known for: Painting Sculpture
- Movement: Abstract art
- Website: rheacarmi.com

Reaching Out - Earth Music
- Artist: Rhea Carmi
- Year: 2009
- Type: Mixed media, Box-spring, tar paper, twine and paint
- Dimensions: 180 cm × 150 cm × 24 cm (72 in × 60 in × 9.5 in)
- Location: Los Angeles

Rhea Carmi (Hebrew: ברוריה כרמי; born 1942) (variant name: Bruria Carmi), is an Israeli American abstract and mixed-media artist and sculptor.

== Life and work ==
Carmi was born in Jerusalem. She studied visual art at Tel-Aviv University 1974-1976, and attended Ramat-Gan Institute for The Arts 1977-1979. Her mentors were Israeli artists Arie Aroch and Motti Mizrachi.

Carmi utilizes a variety of media—oils, sand, water, treated paper, canvas and wood—which she layers, smooths and sculpts. The paintings are a personal diary of the artist.

Carmi is a member of the ARTROM Gallery Guild and served as juror for Abstract Forms for the ARTROM International Art Competition 2008

She lives and works in Los Angeles, California.

Her name means: Pure and Clear

== Solo exhibitions ==
- 1980 Beit Yad LeBanim Tel Aviv, Israel
- 1980 The Tel-Aviv Art Pavilion Tel Aviv, Israel
- 1980/1981 Turel Art Gallery Tel Aviv, Israel
- 1981 13&1/2 Gallery Jaffa, Israel
- 2004 Lawrence Asher Gallery Los Angeles, CA
- 2005 Lawrence Asher Gallery Los Angeles, CA
- 2006 The Gotthelf Art Gallery Los Angeles, CA
- 2006 Lawrence Asher Gallery Los Angeles, CA
- 2007 LA Contemporary Los Angeles, CA
- 2008 Soka University of America, Founder's Hall Art Gallery Aliso Viejo, CA
- 2008 Frank Pictures Gallery Santa Monica, CA
- 2008 Villa di Donato Napoli, Italy
- 2009 Concordia University Irvine, CA

== Group exhibitions ==
- 1980/1981 Turel Art Gallery New York, NY
- 1984 Pacific Design Center Los Angeles, CA
- 2004 B.G.H Gallery Santa Monica, CA
- 2004 TarFest Los Angeles, CA
- 2005 Municipal Art Gallery Los Angeles, CA
- 2006 Klapper Gallery Los Angeles, CA
- 2007 Art Pic North Hollywood, CA
- 2007 Galerie Le Cocon Hamburg, Germany
- 2007 Torrance Art Museum Torrance, CA
- 2007/2008 Riverside Art Museum Riverside, CA
- 2009 CAP Gallery Laguna Beach, CA
- 2009 USC Hillel/companion show to MAG(Barnsdall) LA, CA
- 2010 Bell Gallery Los Angeles, CA
- 2010 Gotthelf Art Gallery La Jola, CA
- 2010 the Jewish Federation's Bell Family Gallery, Los Angeles, CA
- 2010 Four Seasons Hotel Gallery, Westlake Village, CA
- 2010 Orange County Center for Contemporary Art, Santa Ana, CA
- 2010 Los Angeles Municipal Art Gallery, Los Angeles, CA
- 2010 Gotthelf Art Gallery, La Jolla, CA
- 2010 Four Seasons Hotel Gallery, Westlake Village, CA
- 2011 Four Seasons Hotel Gallery, Westlake Village, CA
- 2011 "Text and Texture", Fresh Paint Gallery, Culver City, CA
- 2012 Four Seasons Hotel Gallery, Westlake Village, CA
- 2012 Keller Williams, Encino, CA
- 2012 LA Art Platform, Santa Monica, CA
- 2012 "40/40" USC Hillel, Santa Monica, CA

== Public collections ==
Carmi's work is included in the public collections of:

- Museum of Tolerance, Los Angeles, CA
- Soka University of America, Aliso Viejo, CA

== See also ==
- Abstract art
- Postmodernism
- Mixed media
- Shaped canvas
