= Jean-Jacques Bernard =

Jean-Jacques Bernard (30 July 1888 – 14 September 1972) was a French playwright and the chief representative of what became known as l’école du silence or, as some critics called it, the art of the unexpressed, in which the dialogue does not express the characters’ real attitudes. In Martine (1922), perhaps the best example of his work, emotions are implied in gestures, facial expressions, fragments of speech and silence. He was active from 1912 to 1939.

Bernard was born in Enghien-les-Bains, Val-d'Oise, the son of the dramatist Tristan Bernard. As a Jew, he was interned for a period of months starting in December 1941 in Compiègne, at a camp where 50,000 Jews were deported to concentration camps. He died in Paris, aged 84.

== Plays ==
- 1939: Le Jardinier d'Ispahan (Ispahan's gardener)
- 1922: Martine, his biggest success
- c. 1920: Le Feu qui Reprend Mal (the fire that does not start)
- 1919: La Maison Epargnée (the spared house), performed at the Théâtre Antoine
- 1912: La Joie du Sacrifice (the joy of sacrifice) and Les Enfants Jouent (the children are playing.
- n.d. Le Printemps des Autres (the others' spring)
- n.d. L'Invitation au Voyage (the invitation to travel)
- n.d. Denise Marette
- n.d. L'âme en Peine (the sad soul)
- n.d. Le Secret d'Arvers (the secret of Arvers)
- n.d. Le Roi de Malousie (the king of Malousie)
- n.d. Les Soeurs Guédonec (the sisters Guédonec)
- n.d. Jeanne de Pantin
- n.d. A la Recherche des Coeurs (looking for hearts)
- n.d. National 6

== Sources ==
- Author and Bookinfo.com
