= Ayelet Carmi =

Israeli painter and installation artist (born 1967)

- אילת כרמי
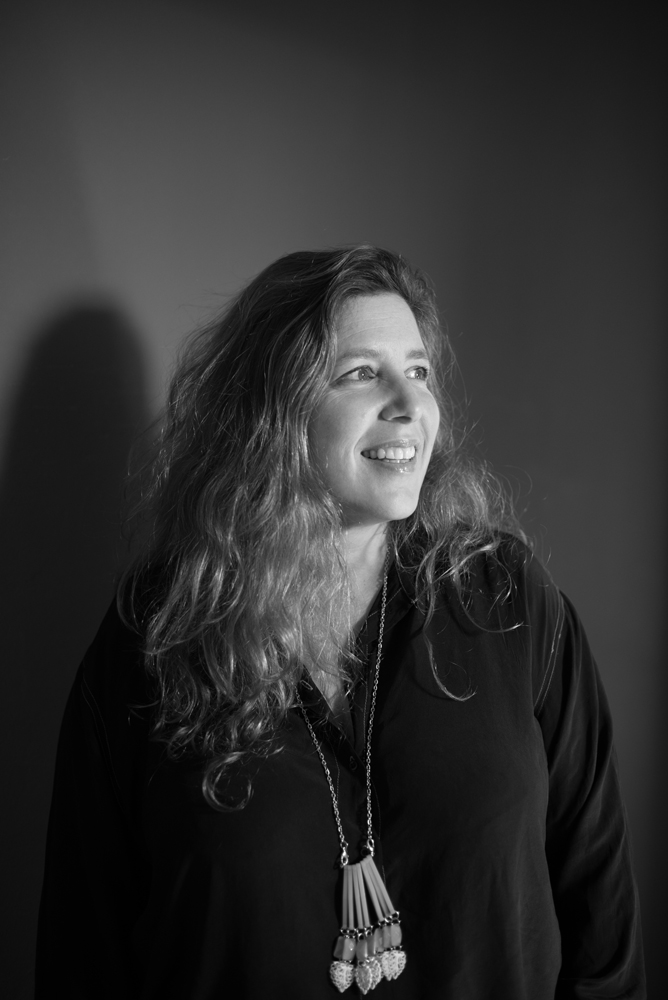
- Born: 21 July 1967 (age 58); Beit HaShita, Israel
- Citizenship: Israeli
- Occupations: Painter and installation artist
- Website: http://ayeletcarmi.com/

Ayelet Carmi (Hebrew: אילת כרמי; born 21 July 1967) is an Israeli painter and installation artist.

== Biography ==
Carmi was born in 1967 in Kibbutz Beit HaShita. She is a graduate of the Bezalel Academy of Arts and Design in Jerusalem. Her works are characterized by feminine figures in mythological settings, organic hybrids and evocative machinery. Based in traditional painterly technique, her works offer a complex take on the representational style of the Western tradition while opening up to a world of imaginary figments and metamorphoses.

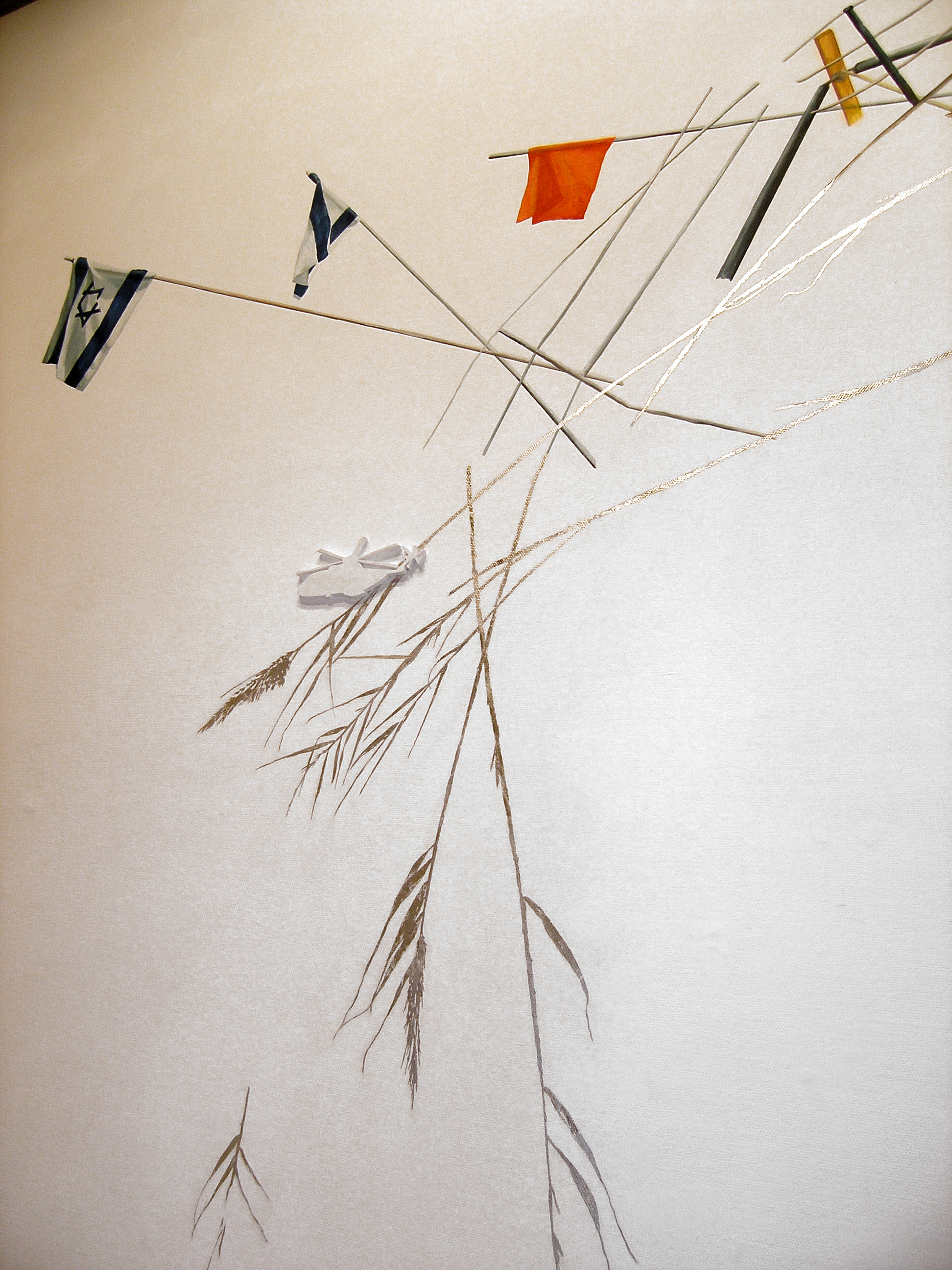
"The Maccabiah", mural in the exhibition "On the Banks of the Yarkon", Tel Aviv Museum of Art, 2005

Galia Bar Or, the director and curator of The Museum of Art in Ein Harod, considers Carmi as: “the inventor of a new genre of painting all her own. Cleverly escaping the entrapments of traditional painting, her work engages in a deep and thoughtful dialogue with relational depth patterns, its highly sensitized nervous system producing art that is nuanced, lightweight and fragmentary. […] Boundless and deeply personal, Carmi's version of [the myth of the artist] is channeled through the female nudes that dominate her work, women whose brushstrokes continuously recreate a world in painting – recreating but never appropriating. Essentially open-ended, her works come together and unravel as they echo a painterly realm suffused with architecture, politics, rites, theatrical sets, imagery and identities."

Carmi's pieces in two-dimensional media often consist of "an overlay of thin, see-through papers [...] It appears as though they are sculptures forced into two dimensions, as if trying to break the limits of their own form."

Recently, she has been developing new work in video and performance in collaboration with artist Meirav Heiman. Carmi holds teaching positions at the Holon Institute of Technology (HIT), HaMidrasha – Faculty of the Arts in Beit Berl College and The Tel Aviv Museum's Meyerhoff Art Education Center.

== Exhibitions ==
Carmi has had solo exhibitions at the Museum of Art Ein Harod, The Haifa Museum of Art, The Kibbutz Gallery in Tel Aviv and the Jerusalem Artists House, among other venues in Israel. She participated in group exhibitions locally and internationally, showing her work at The Tel Aviv Museum of Art, The Museum of Israeli Art in Ramat Gan, The Janco Dada Museum in Ein Hod, the Alexander Ochs Gallery in Berlin and more.

== Awards ==
2017 minister of culture award
2017 Support from Asylum Arts, NY, “Israel Trail” project with Meirav Heiman
2017 Support from Artis, Project Grant “Israel Trail” project with Meirav Heiman
2016 Pais Culture Council's Grant for the “Israel Trail Production", in the field of New Work of new media, project with Meirav Heiman
2015 Support from the Rabinowitz fund for “Eclipse”, Joint video project with Meirav Heiman
2010 Ministry of Education and Culture Prize
2003 Honorable mention, First Portrait project, Israel National Lottery Council for the Arts

== Selected solo exhibitions ==
2018 The Israel Trail: Procession, (with Meirav Heiman), Petah Tikva Museum of Art, Israel, Villa Tamaris, France
2018 Sphere, (with Meirav Heiman), Neve Schechter gallery, Tel Aviv, Israel
2016 Icosahedron, (with Meirav Heiman), Haifa Museum of Art, Israel
2015 From Andy Warhol to Contemporary Art: Culture, Color, Body, Haifa Museum of Art, Israel
2013 A Person Worries, Museum of Art, Ein Harod, Israel
2010 Two Thousand Feet, Gallery 39, Tel Aviv
2010 Schatten der Flügel, Liberale Jüdische Gemeinde, Hannover, Germany
2008 Alexantropia, Gallery 39, Tel Aviv
2004 Siamese Twins, Museum of Art Ein Harod, Israel
2003 Bring Me the Head of Prince Charming, The Kibbutz Gallery, Tel Aviv
2000 My Last Travels in the Continent, The Kibbutz Gallery, Tel Aviv
1996 The Jerusalem Artists House
1996 Paintings, The Kibbutz Gallery, Tel Aviv

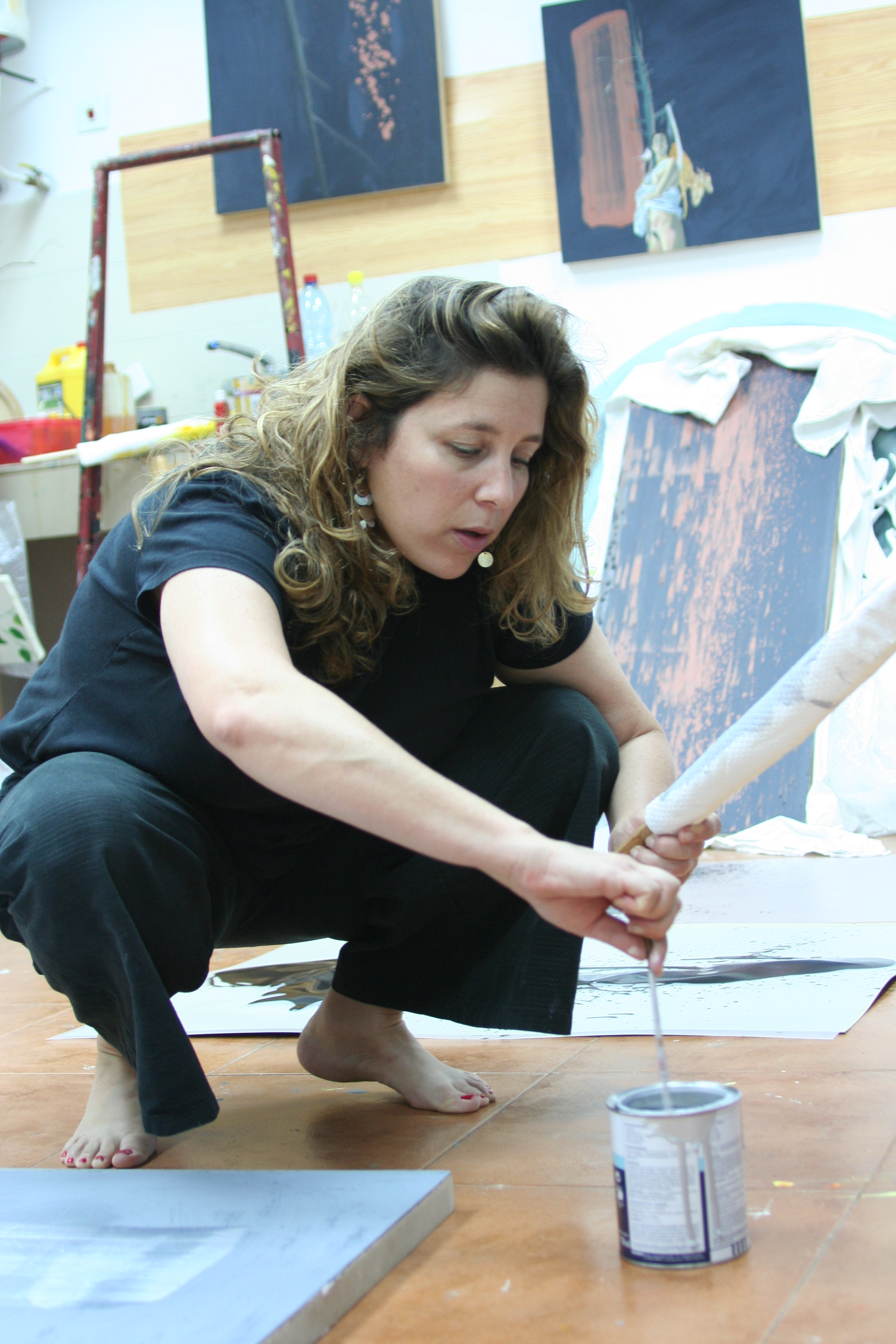
Ayelet Carmi at her studio, 2008

== Selected group exhibitions ==
2018 Flower Power, group show, Galerie circle1, Barlin, Germany
2016 Looking into Blindness, Between Synapses, Jerusalem Artists House, Jerusalem, Israel
2016 Guides, Ben-Gurion University of the Negev, Department of the Arts, Israel
2015 Stuttgarter Filmwinter, Joint project with Meirav Haiman, festival for expanded media, Stuttgart, Germany
2015 Local Pulse 2, Joint project with Meirav Haiman, Artists house, Tel Aviv, Israel
2015 Tomorrow is here, Joint project with Merav Heiman at the Futuristic night at Tel Aviv Museum of Art, Tel Aviv, Israel
2014 Far and Beyond, The Mansion House, Tel Aviv
2013 To Leave a Mark, as part of "Traces V: The 5th Biennale for Drawing in Israel," Jerusalem Print Workshop, Israel
2012 The Cheerful Mummy, Museum of Israeli Art, Ramat Gan, Israel
2011 2010 Winners: the Israeli Ministry of Education and Culture Prizes for Art and Design, Ramat Gan Museum of Israeli Art, Ramat Gan, Israel
2010 More than Canvas, Tel Aviv Museum of Art, Israel
2009 Something in the White, Culture and Art Center, Nazareth, Israel
2008 Resident Artists Show, The Artists' Residence, Herzliya, Israel
2007 The Beauty of the Void, Gallery 39, Tel Aviv, Israel
2005 On the Banks of the Yarkon: The Yarkon River in Israeli Art, Tel Aviv Museum of Art, Israel
2000 Magician, Wizard, and Artist Meet, The New Artists’ Quarter Gallery, Kiryat Tivon, Israel
1994 Separate Worlds, Tel Aviv Museum of Art, Tel Aviv, Israel

== Gallery ==
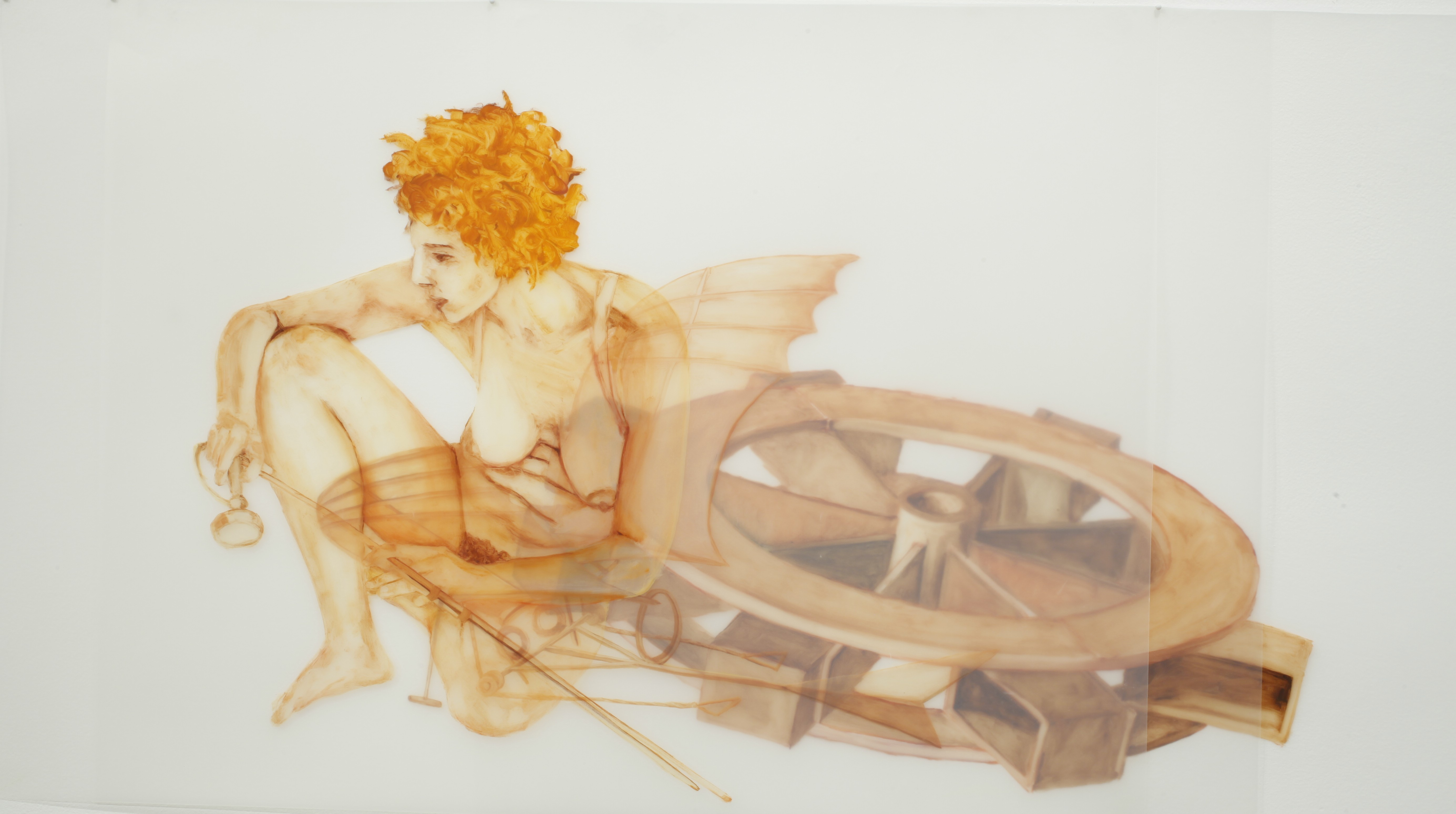
"Scientist Wall 2", from the exhibition "Two Thousand Feet", oil on Meiller paper, 70x143 cm, 2010

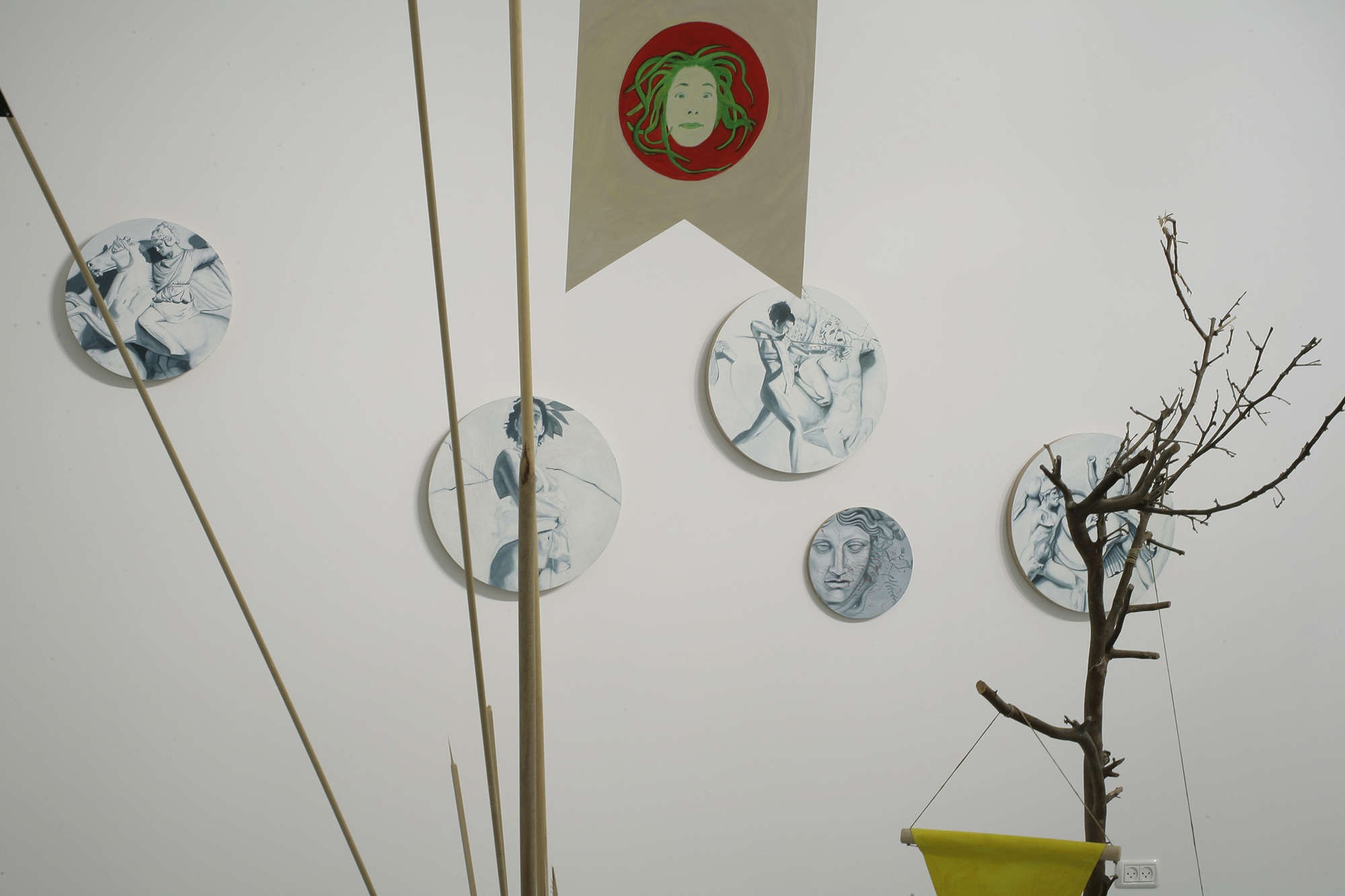
"Alexantropia", installation view, Gallery 39, Tel Aviv, 2008 (detail)

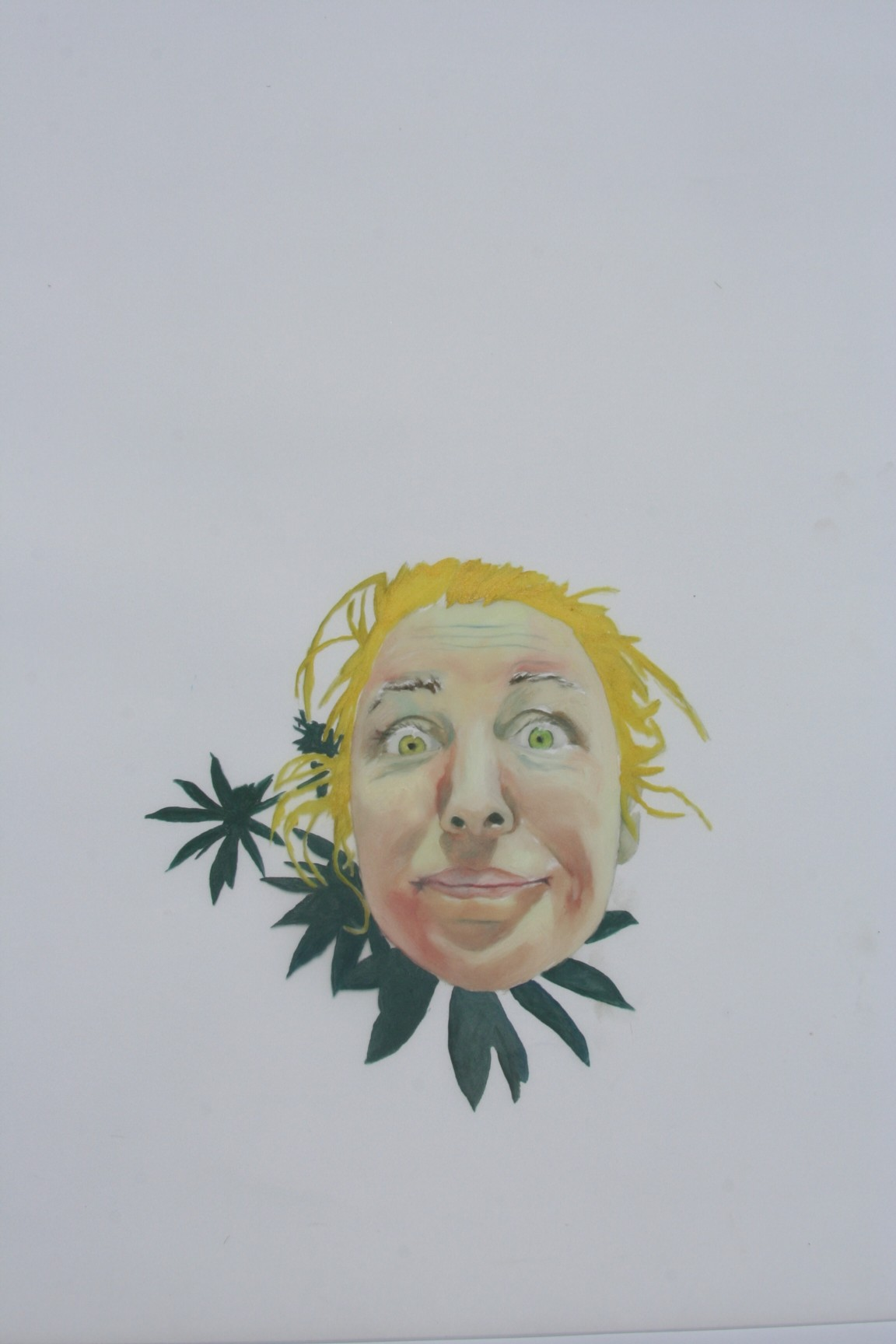
"The Joker", oil on plastic, 2008

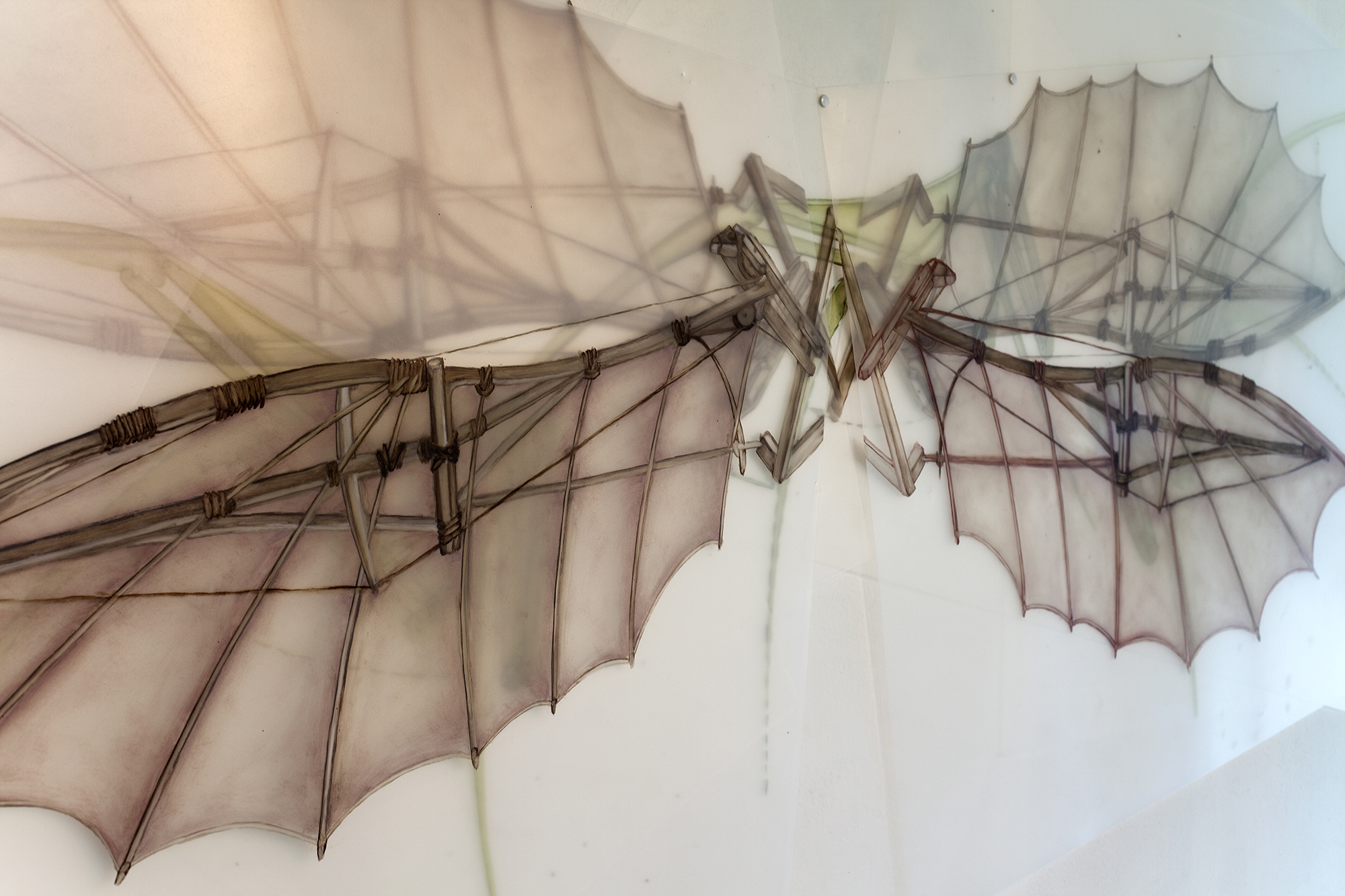
"Scales and Measures", from the project "Beita 1", Berlin, oil on Meiller paper, 170x300 cm, 2010

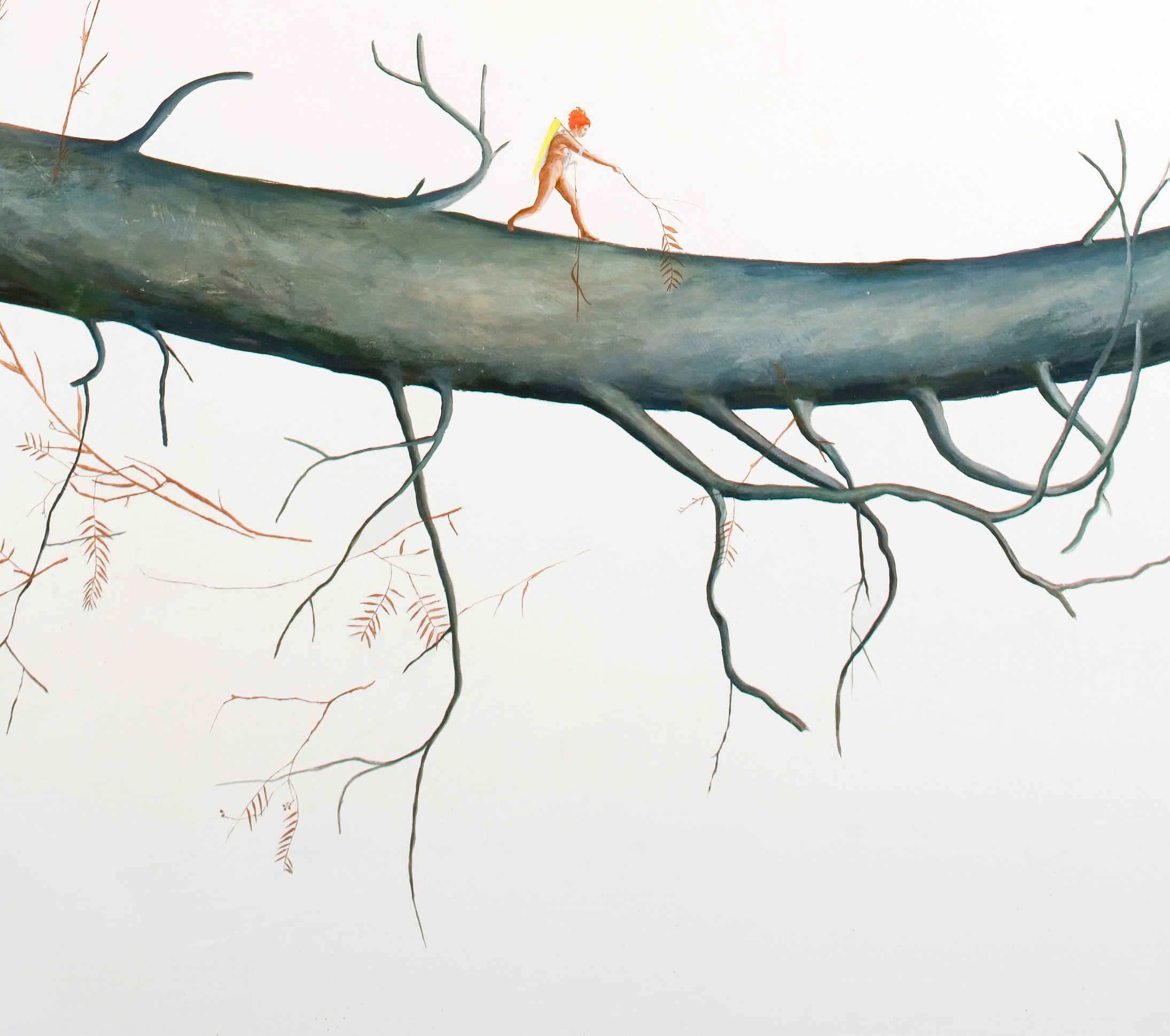
"Street Realm", mural at The Artists Residence, Herzliya, Israel, 2007 (detail)

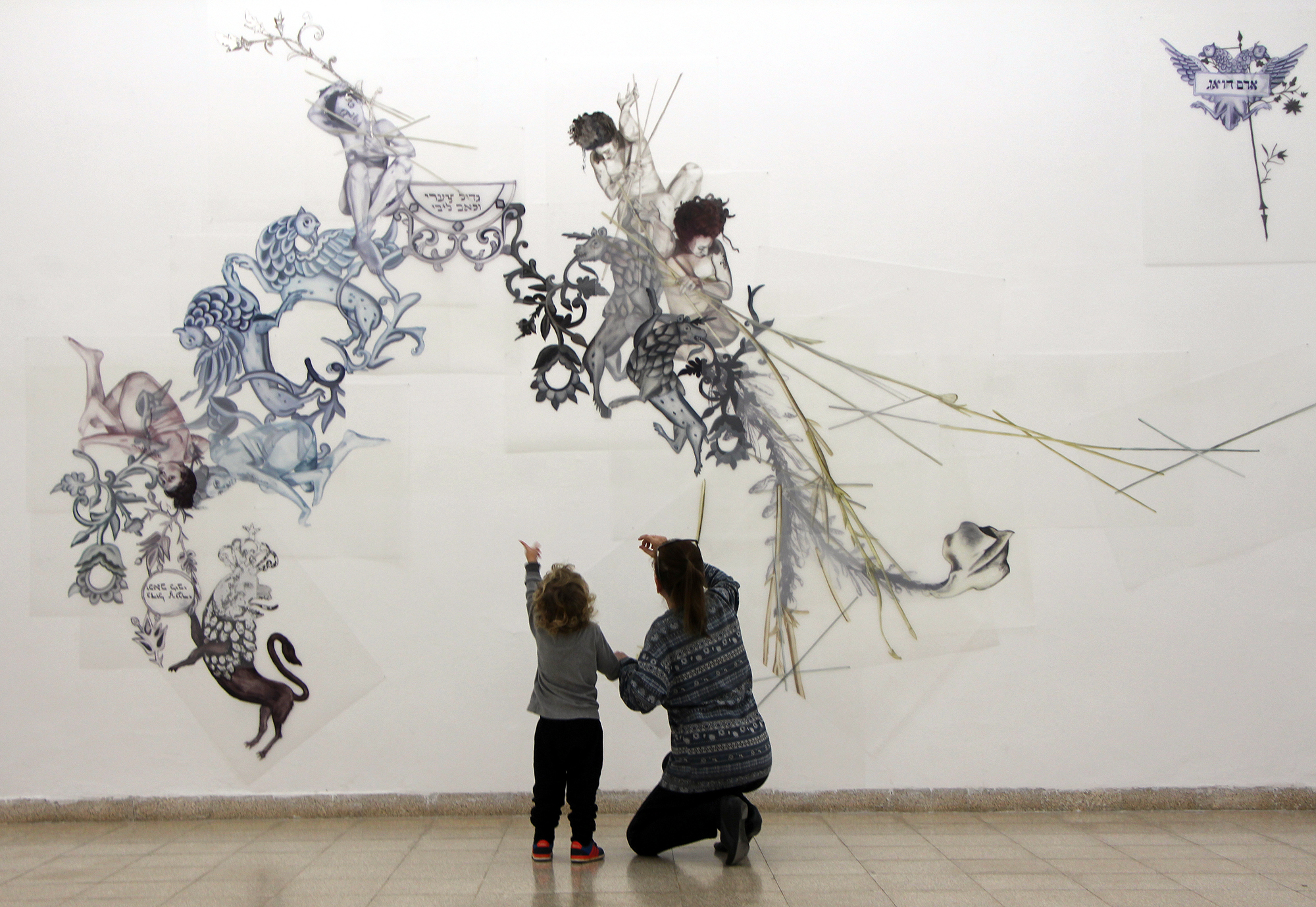
"A Person Worries", installation view, Museum of Art, Ein Harod, Israel, 2013

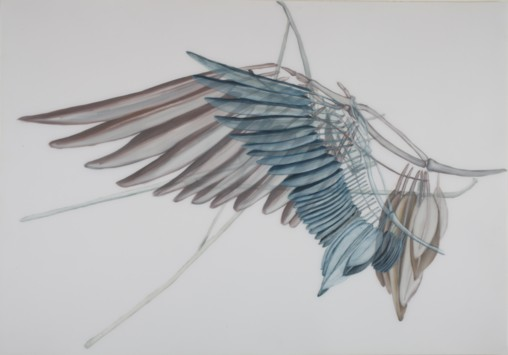
"Two Thousand Feet", oil on Meiller paper, 70x100 cm, 2010

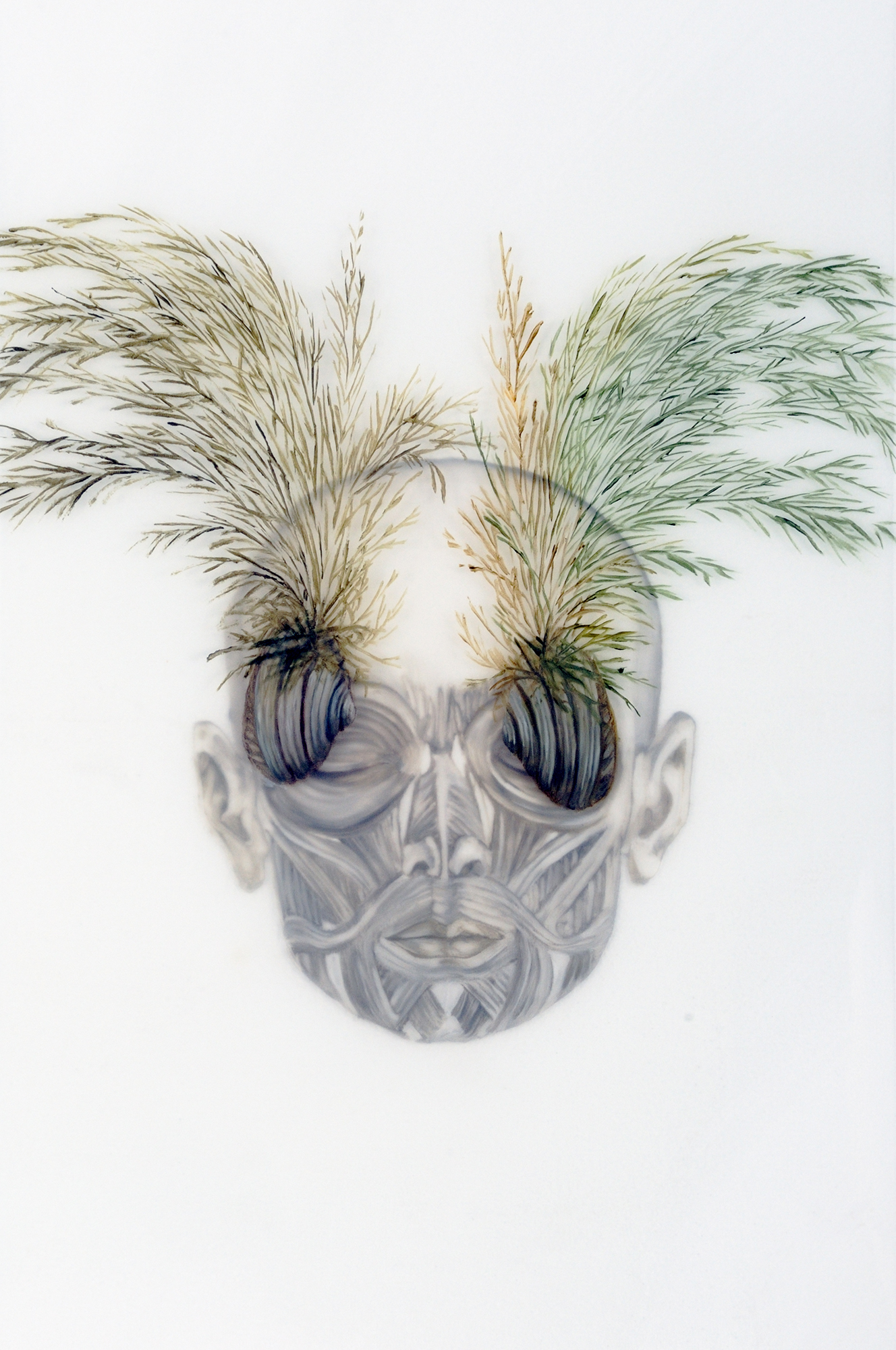
"Untitled", oil on plastic, 2010

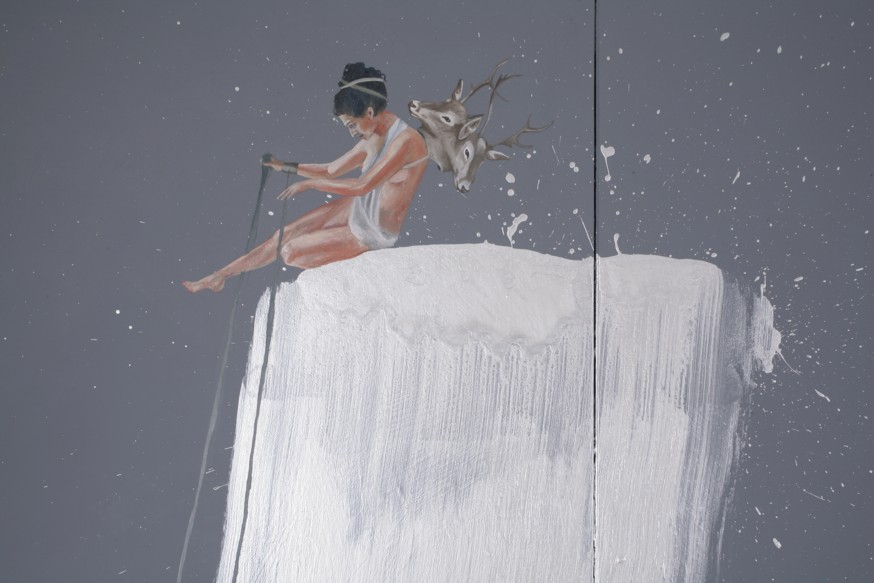
"Science of Writing the Land", mural at The Artplus Hotel, Tel Aviv, 2008 (detail)

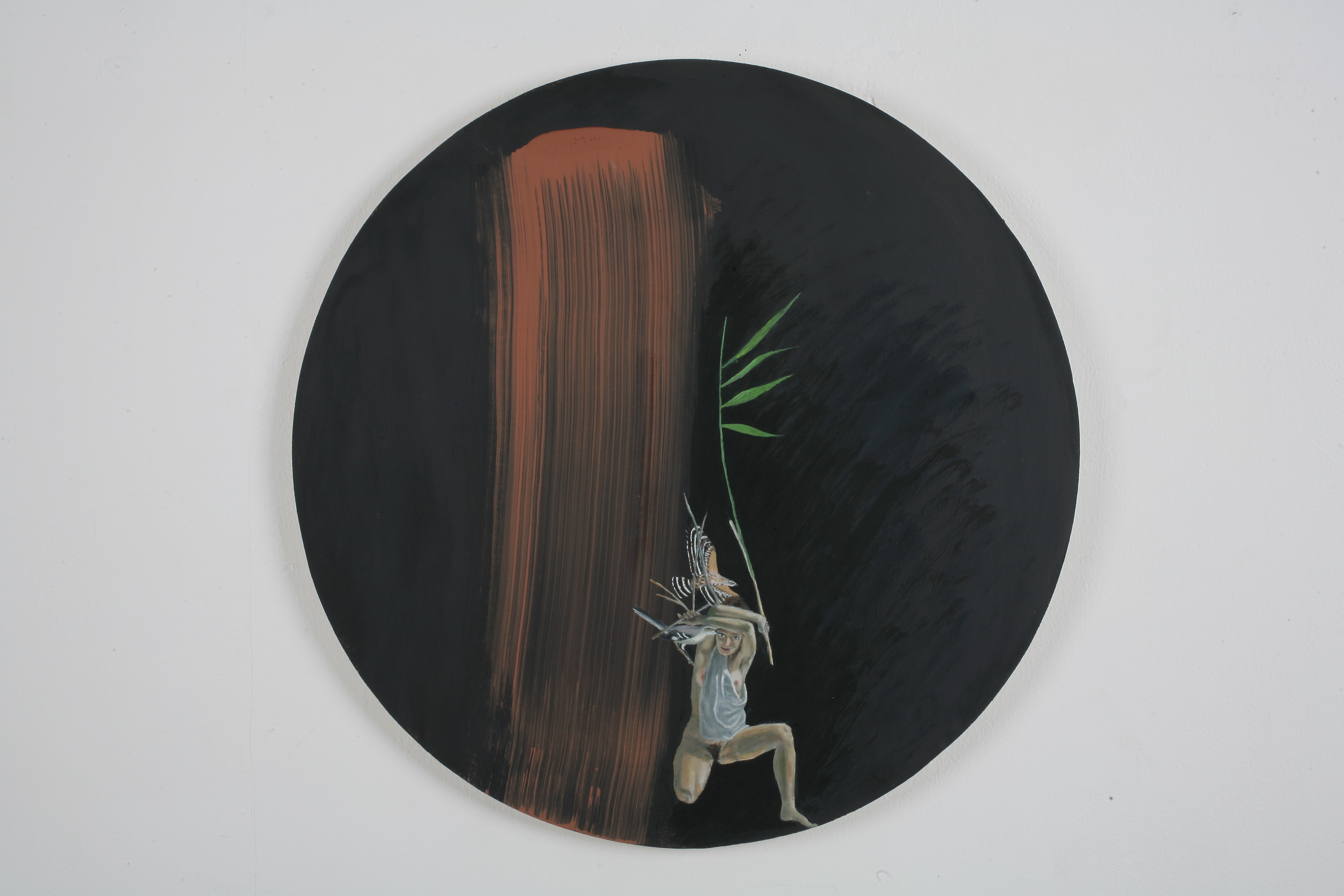
"Untitled", oil on wood, 55x55 cm, 2007
