= Benjamin ben Samuel =

11th-century French Talmudist and liturgical poet

Benjamin ben Samuel (Hebrew: בנימין בן שמואל) was a French Talmudist and liturgical poet who lived at Coutances in the first half of the eleventh century. Thirty-one of his liturgical pieces are preserved in various ritual collections.

== Career ==
Most of his poems occur in the French ritual, while the old German and Polish rituals contain each one of his poems. Benjamin wrote mainly for the three festivals and Rosh Hashanah, and a few poems for Yom Kippur. It is doubtful whether certain liturgies containing "Benjamin" in acrostic are to be attributed to him or to his younger contemporary, Benjamin ben Zerah.

Benjamin was also considered a great Talmudic authority. In one of his decisions, cited by Isaac Halevi, he shows the connection between Midrash and piyyut, explaining that both originated in public readings, and drawing the conclusion that the opposition to the insertion of piyyutim in the prayers is unfounded. Benjamin's preference for Akiba's "Alphabet," which he uses in his liturgical poems, reveals a certain inclination toward mysticism.
