= Abdul Rahim Sebah =

Ghanaian footballer

Personal information
- Date of birth: 27 December 1991 (age 34)
- Place of birth: Accra, Ghana
- Height: 1.80 m (5 ft 11 in)
- Position: Defender

Senior career*
Years	Team	Apps	(Gls)
2009–2010	Charleroi	1	(0)
2010–2012	Kasımpaşa	5	(0)
2012–?	Edirnespor		
- * Club domestic league appearances and goals

Abdul Rahim Sebah (born 27 December 1991) is a Ghanaian professional footballer who played as a defender.
