= Jacqueline Lévi-Valensi =

French academic

Jacqueline Lévi-Valensi (1932–2004) was a French academic.
