= Nine Moati =

French novelist (1937–2021)

Nine Moati (27 July 1937, in Paris – 1 May 2021, in Paris) was a French novelist, with Tunisian-Jewish origins. Nine Moati is the sister of the French film director Serge Moati.

Her greatest book success was the novel Les Belles de Tunis which was published in 1983.

She has also created film scripts like:

- Deux femmes à Paris (2000)
- Mon enfant, ma mère (1981)

== External links & internet documents ==
- Oral history interview with Nine Moati Caries, United States Holocaust Memorial Museum oral history collection, Oral History | Accession Number: 2018.549.1 | RG Number: RG-50.030.1003, September 2018, Interview with Nine Moati by United States Holocaust Memorial Museum oral history collection (Interviewer Peggy Frankston), interview is in French
- « Les belles de Tunis-sont-en-deuil », Memorial evocation containing biographical references and citations of Nine Moaiti in « Paysages: paysages et livres – Landschaften und Bücher – Landscapes and Books », 24. Mai 2021 (in French)

== Sources ==
- Nine Moati at IMDb
