= Serge Moati =

French actor, writer, producer, director and screenwriter (born 1946)

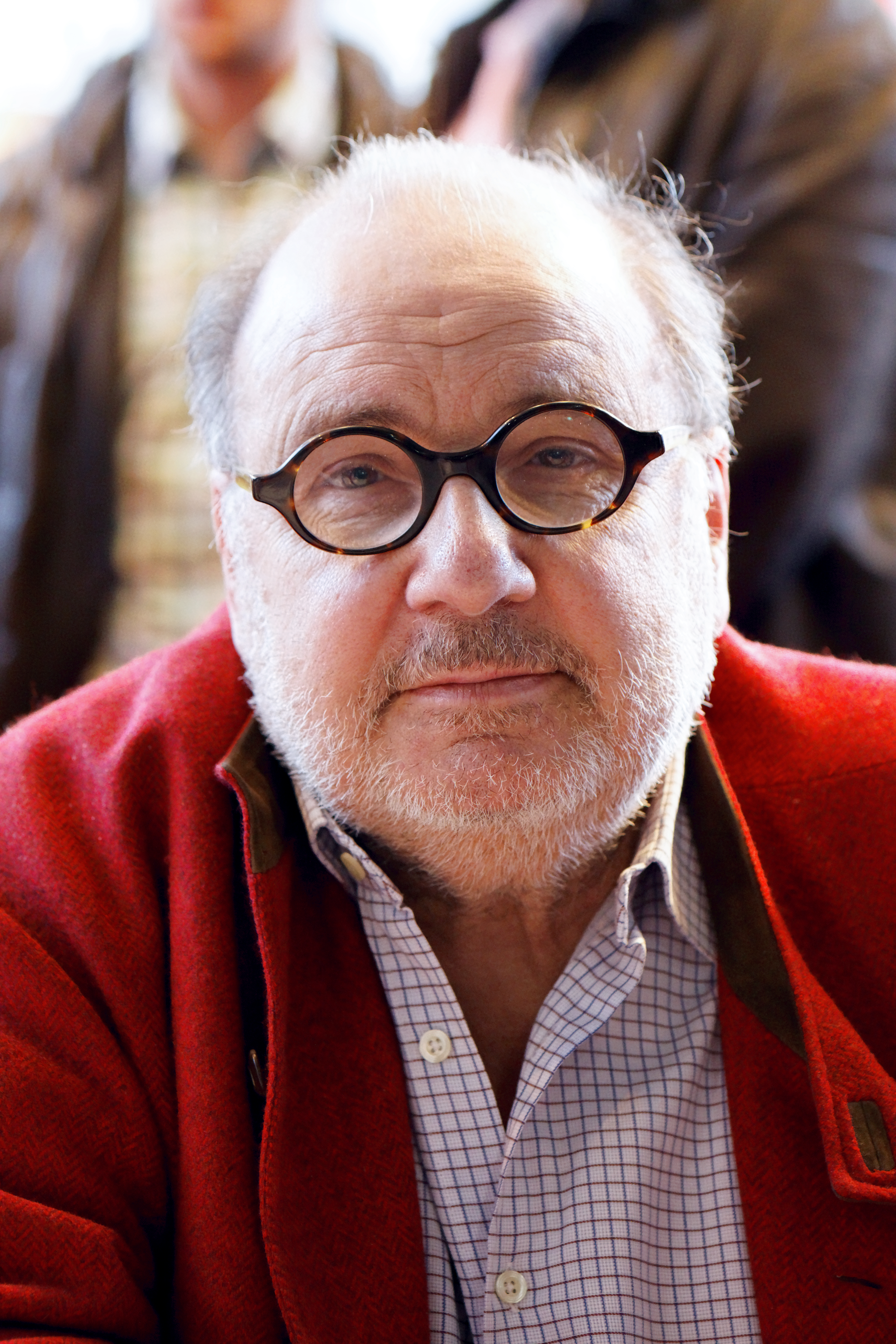
- Serge Moati in 2011
- Born: Henry Moati; 17 August 1946 (age 80); Tunis, Tunisia
- Occupations: Journalist, writer, film director, screenwriter, actor, producer, television presenter

Serge Moati (born Henry Moati; 17 August 1946) is a French journalist, television presenter, film director and writer. He is the brother of Nine Moati, author of the novel Les Belles de Tunis. As is his sister, Serge Moati is a French citizen, with Tunisian-Jewish origins. He is the father of the actor Félix Moati.

Moati was formerly a political consultant/public relations manager for François Mitterrand.

== Filmography ==
- Niger: Water on the Savanna (1970)
- Le sagouin (1972) - TV movie
- Le pain noir (1974–1975) - TV mini-series
- Golden Night (1976)
- Rossel et la commune de Paris (1977) - TV movie
- Ciné-roman (1978) - TV movie
- Yan Diga - Ils traverseront des pays comme des jardins (1979)
- Mont-Oriol (1980) - TV movie
- Mon enfant, ma mère (1981) - TV movie
- T'es grand et puis t'oublies (1981) - TV movie
- Les sept jours du marié (1982) - TV movie
- La croisade des enfants (1988) - TV movie
- L'été de tous les chagrins (1989) - TV movie
- Olympe de nos amours (1989) - TV movie
- Le piège (1991) - TV movie
- Dix ans après (1991) - documentary
- Edwige Feuillère en scène (1993) - TV movie
- Des feux mal éteints (1994)
- Une femme dans la tourmente (1995) - TV movie
- Une page d'amour (1995) - TV movie
- Tendre piège (1996) - TV movie
- Parfum de famille (1997) - TV movie
- Le secret de Bastien (1997) - TV movie
- Sapho (1997) - TV movie
- Un mois de réflexion (1998) - TV movie
- Jésus (1999) - TV movie
- Maison de famille (1999) - TV movie
- Les complices (1999) - TV movie
- Une vie ordinaire ou Mes questions sur l'homosexualité (2001) - TV documentary
- Tous en scène! Ou spectacles d'une élection (2002) - TV movie
- Un an après (2003) - TV documentary
- Radio France: 24 heures sur 24 (2003) - TV documentary
- Capitaines des ténèbres (2005) - TV movie
- Les mitterrand's' (2006) - TV documentary
- Les Mystères sanglants de l'OTS (2006) - TV documentary, producer
- Mitterrand à Vichy (2008) - TV movie
- Roses à crédit (2010) - producer
- Je vous ai compris: De Gaulle 1958-1962 (2010) - TV movie
- Changer la vie, Mitterrand 1981-1983 (2011) - TV movie

== Books ==
- Villa Jasmin (Fayard 2003)
- Du côté des vivants (Fayard 2006)
