= Mordecai Karmi =

Rabbi Mordecai Crémieux

Personal life
- Born: 1749 Carpentras, Provence
- Died: May 22, 1825 (aged 75–76)

Religious life
- Religion: Judaism

Mordecai ben Abraham Crémieux (Hebrew: מרדכי בן אברהם כרמי, romanized: Mordekhai ben Avraham Karmi; 1749 – May 22, 1825) was a rabbi at Carpentras, Provence, and at the end of his life was rabbi in Aix-en-Provence. He was the author of Ma'amar Mordekhai ('Treatise of Mordecai'), a commentary on the Shulḥan Arukh, Oraḥ Ḥayyim, in two parts (Leghorn, 1784). He also financed the first siddur according to the Provençal rite.

== See also ==
- Crémieux family
