= Kevin Parienté =

French footballer (born 1987)

Kevin Pariente
Personal information
- Date of birth: 19 January 1987 (age 39)
- Place of birth: Paris, France
- Height: 1.72 m (5 ft 8 in)
- Position: Striker

Youth career
- 2000–2002: Paris Saint-Germain
- 2000–2003: Clairefontaine
- 2003–2005: Paris Saint-Germain

Senior career*
Years	Team	Apps	(Gls)
2005–2007	Levante B	25	(1)
2008–2010	Sedan	15	(1)
2010	AS Cannes	12	(1)
2011	Bucaspor	0	(0)
- * Club domestic league appearances and goals

Kévin Parienté (born 19 January 1987) is a French professional footballer who plays a midfielder. Besides France, he has played in Spain, Turkey.

== Biography ==
=== Early years ===
Born in Paris, Pariente was a student at the Clairefontaine, an elite football academy in France. From there he joined the youth side of Paris Saint-Germain.

His ended contract with Sedan was on 1 February 2010 dissolved, the midfielder signed a new deal for AS Cannes, until the end of season..
