= List of Turkish football transfers summer 2013 =

This is a list of Turkish football transfers in the summer transfer window 2013 by club. Only transfers of the Süper Lig are included.

== Süper Lig ==
=== Galatasaray ===
Note: Flags indicate national team as has been defined under FIFA eligibility rules. Players may hold more than one non-FIFA nationality.

In:

| No. | Pos. | Nation | Player |
|---|---|---|---|
| 3 | MF | BRA | Felipe Melo (from Juventus, previously on loan) |
| 19 | FW | TUR | Umut Bulut (from Toulouse, previously on loan) |
| 20 | FW | POR | Armindo Tué Na Bangna (from Sporting CP) |
| 21 | DF | CMR | Aurélien Chedjou (from Lille) |
| 24 | MF | TUR | Erman Kılıç (from Sivasspor) |

Out:

| No. | Pos. | Nation | Player |
|---|---|---|---|
| 3 | DF | TUR | Çağlar Birinci (to Elazığspor) |
| 9 | FW | SWE | Johan Elmander (on loan to Norwich City) |
| 23 | MF | TUR | Furkan Özçal (on loan to Kardemir Karabükspor) |
| 24 | MF | TUR | Erman Kılıç (to Eskişehirspor) |
| 27 | DF | CZE | Tomáš Ujfaluši (to Sparta Prague) |
| — | MF | TUR | Serdar Eylik (on loan to Ankaraspor) |
| — | FW | TUR | Mehmet Batdal (to İstanbul B.B.) |
| — | FW | TUR | Sercan Yıldırım (to Şanlıurfaspor) |
| — | MF | ARG | Emmanuel Culio (to Deportivo de La Coruña) |
| — | FW | TUR | Colin Kazim-Richards (to Bursaspor) |

=== Fenerbahçe ===
In:

| No. | Pos. | Nation | Player |
|---|---|---|---|
| 15 | DF | POR | Bruno Alves (from Zenit St. Petersburg) |
| 18 | MF | SWE | Samuel Holmen (from İstanbul BB) |
| 24 | DF | CZE | Michal Kadlec (from Bayer Leverkusen) |
| 26 | MF | TUR | Alper Potuk (from Eskişehirspor) |
| 29 | FW | NGA | Emmanuel Emenike (from Spartak Moscow) |

Out:

| No. | Pos. | Nation | Player |
|---|---|---|---|
| 9 | FW | SVK | Miroslav Stoch (on loan to PAOK) |
| 14 | MF | TUR | Gökay İravul (on loan to Adana Demirspor) |
| 15 | FW | CMR | Henri Bienvenu (to Eskişehirspor) |
| 17 | MF | TUR | Recep Niyaz (on loan to Bucaspor) |
| 20 | MF | TUR | Sezer Öztürk (to Beşiktaş) |
| 33 | DF | SUI | Reto Ziegler (loan return to Juventus) |
| 67 | DF | TUR | Orhan Şam (to Kasımpaşa) |
| 85 | GK | TUR | Serkan Kırıntılı (to Çaykur Rizespor) |
| — | MF | TUR | Berkay Öztuvan (on loan to Göztepe) |
| — | MF | TUR | Beykan Şimşek (on loan to Kardemir Karabükspor) |

=== Beşiktaş ===
In:

| No. | Pos. | Nation | Player |
|---|---|---|---|
| 5 | MF | TUR | Sezer Öztürk (from Fenerbahçe) |
| 7 | FW | BRA | Dentinho (on loan from Shakhtar Donetsk) |
| 13 | MF | CAN | Atiba Hutchinson (from PSV Eindhoven) |
| 17 | MF | TUR | Gökhan Töre (on loan from Rubin Kazan) |
| 21 | FW | TUR | Kerim Frei (from Fulham) |
| 23 | GK | TUR | Günay Güvenç (from Stuttgarter Kickers) |
| 27 | DF | TUR | Serdar Kurtuluş (from Gaziantepspor) |
| 29 | GK | TUR | Tolga Zengin (from Trabzonspor) |
| 30 | FW | NGA | Michael Eneramo (from Sivasspor) |
| 31 | DF | BRA | Ramon de Morais Motta (on loan from Corinthians) |
| 33 | MF | COL | Pedro Franco (from Millonarios) |
| 77 | FW | TUR | Ömer Şişmanoğlu (from Antalyaspor) |

Out:

| No. | Pos. | Nation | Player |
|---|---|---|---|
| 2 | DF | TUR | Berat Çetinkaya (on loan to Kahramanmaraşspor) |
| 13 | DF | GER | Roberto Hilbert (to Bayer Leverkusen) |
| 17 | FW | TUR | Mehmet Akyüz (to Akhisar Belediyespor) |
| 23 | GK | SCO | Allan McGregor (to Hull City) |
| 24 | DF | TUR | Emre Özkan (to Kardemir Karabükspor) |
| 26 | DF | TUR | Sinan Kurumuş (on loan to Boluspor) |
| 39 | MF | TUR | Erkan Kaş (on loan to Kardemir Karabükspor) |
| 53 | FW | SEN | Mamadou Niang (loan return to Al Sadd) |
| — | MF | POR | Júlio Alves |
| — | DF | TUR | Özgür Özkaya (to Elazığspor) |
| — | DF | AUT | Tanju Kayhan (on loan to Eskişehirspor) |
| — | MF | TUR | Hasan Türk (on loan to Göztepe) |
| — | DF | TUR | Atınç Nukan (on loan to Dardanelspor) |
| — | MF | TUR | Burak Kaplan (on loan to Fethiyespor) |

=== Bursaspor ===
In:

| No. | Pos. | Nation | Player |
|---|---|---|---|
| 1 | GK | FRA | Sébastien Frey (from Genoa) |
| 2 | DF | ARG | Renato Civelli (from Nice) |
| 3 | DF | NGA | Taye Taiwo (from A.C. Milan) |
| 6 | MF | TUR | Samil Cinaz (from Orduspor) |
| 55 | MF | AUT | Yasin Pehlivan (from Gaziantepspor) |
| — | FW | TUR | Colin Kazim-Richards (from Galatasaray) |

Out:

| No. | Pos. | Nation | Player |
|---|---|---|---|
| 3 | DF | ENG | Anton Ferdinand (loan return to QPR) |
| 6 | DF | BRA | Gökçek Vederson (to Antalyaspor) |
| 16 | DF | TUR | Ömer Erdoğan (Retired) |
| 17 | GK | ENG | Scott Carson (to Wigan Athletic) |
| 19 | DF | TUR | Onur Akbay (to Şanlıurfaspor) |
| 21 | MF | USA | Maurice Edu (loan return to Stoke City) |
| — | DF | TUR | İbrahim Kaş (to Elazığspor) |
| — | DF | AUS | Aziz Behich (on loan to Melbourne Heart) |
| — | FW | GHA | Prince Tagoe |
| — | FW | SLE | Teteh Bangura (on loan to Beitar Jerusalem) |
| — | FW | TUR | İsmail Haktan Odabaşı (to Şanlıurfaspor) |
| — | DF | TUR | Yenal Tuncer (to Denizlispor) |
| — | MF | TUR | Ahmet Arı (to Denizlispor) |
| — | MF | TUR | Barış Örücü (to Denizlispor) |
| — | MF | FIN | Petteri Forsell |

=== Kayserispor ===
In:

| No. | Pos. | Nation | Player |
|---|---|---|---|
| 4 | DF | TUR | Cüneyt Köz (from Dynamo Dresden) |
| 10 | FW | BRA | Jajá (on loan from Metalist Kharkiv) |
| 11 | FW | TUR | Mert Nobre (from Mersin İdmanyurdu) |
| 16 | MF | SRB | Srđan Mijailović (from Red Star Belgrade) |
| 20 | MF | TUR | Bilal Gülden (from Ankaragücü) |
| 23 | MF | TUR | Taner Yalçın (from İstanbul B.B.) |
| — | DF | POR | Henrique Sereno (from Porto) |
| — | FW | TUR | Alper Uludağ (from Ingolstadt) |
| — | FW | TUR | Sinan Bakış (from Bayer 04 Leverkusen) |

Out:

| No. | Pos. | Nation | Player |
|---|---|---|---|
| 16 | MF | PAR | Cristian Riveros (to Grêmio) |
| 25 | DF | TUR | Nurettin Kayaoğlu (on loan to Adana Demirspor) |
| 26 | MF | TUR | Kamil Ahmet Çörekçi (on loan to Adana Demirspor) |
| 54 | MF | TUR | Ceyhun Gülselam (loan return to Galatasaray) |
| — | DF | TUR | Eren Güngör (to Kardemir Karabükspor) |
| — | DF | ISL | Grétar Steinsson |

=== Kasımpaşa ===
In:

| No. | Pos. | Nation | Player |
|---|---|---|---|
| 6 | DF | NED | Ryan Donk (from Club Brugge) |
| 8 | FW | NED | Ryan Babel (from Ajax) |
| 11 | FW | ARG | Ezequiel Scarione (from St Gallen) |
| 16 | FW | SYR | Senharib Malki (from Roda) |
| 36 | MF | TUR | Kubilay Aktaş (from Saint-Étienne) |
| 67 | DF | TUR | Orhan Şam (from Fenerbahçe) |
| 88 | MF | POR | André Castro (on loan from Porto) |

Out:

| No. | Pos. | Nation | Player |
|---|---|---|---|
| 24 | MF | GER | Fabian Ernst (Retired) |
| 28 | MF | BIH | Senijad Ibričić (loan return to Lokomotiv Moscow) |
| 30 | FW | ANG | Djalma Campos (loan return to Porto) |
| — | MF | BUL | Georgi Sarmov (to PFC Botev Plovdiv) |
| — | DF | TUR | Abdurrahman Dereli (to Sivasspor) |
| — | FW | URU | Santiago García (to Club Nacional de Football) |
| — | DF | URU | Pablo Pintos (on loan to Club Atlético Tigre) |
| — | MF | TUR | Taner Yıldız (on loan to Bayrampaşaspor) |

=== Antalyaspor ===
In:

| No. | Pos. | Nation | Player |
|---|---|---|---|
| 4 | DF | BRA | Gökçek Vederson (from Bursaspor) |
| 6 | DF | TUR | Serkan Balcı (from Trabzonspor) |
| 27 | FW | CZE | Milan Baroš (from Baník Ostrava) |
| 32 | GK | SVN | Sašo Fornezzi (from Orduspor) |
| 55 | DF | ENG | Anton Ferdinand (from QPR) |
| 90 | MF | ESP | Natxo Insa (from Celta Vigo) |

Out:

| No. | Pos. | Nation | Player |
|---|---|---|---|
| 2 | DF | TUR | Ali Tandoğan (to Mersin İdmanyurdu) |
| 77 | FW | TUR | Ömer Şişmanoğlu (to Beşiktaş) |
| — | FW | MAR | Ismaïl Aissati (to Terek Grozny) |
| — | DF | TUR | Ergün Teber (to Konyaspor) |
| — | MF | TUR | Mehmet Eren Boyraz (to Adana Demirspor) |

=== Eskişehirspor ===
In:

| No. | Pos. | Nation | Player |
|---|---|---|---|
| 7 | FW | CMR | Henri Bienvenu (from Fenerbahçe) |
| 11 | MF | FRA | Alfred N'Diaye (on loan from Sunderland) |
| — | DF | ARG | Lucas Rodríguez (from Argentinos Juniors) |
| — | MF | TUR | Erman Kılıç (from Galatasaray) |
| — | DF | AUT | Tanju Kayhan (on loan from Beşiktaş) |
| — | FW | TUR | Okan Aydın (from Bayer Leverkusen) |
| — | MF | TUR | Onur Bayramoğlu (from Gençlerbirliği) |
| — | DF | TUR | Mahmut Boz (from Gençlerbirliği) |
| — | FW | TUR | Bertul Kocabaş (on loan from Kardemir Karabükspor) |
| — | FW | CHI | Cristóbal Jorquera (on loan from Parma) |

Out:

| No. | Pos. | Nation | Player |
|---|---|---|---|
| 1 | FW | TUR | Batuhan Karadeniz (to Trabzonspor) |
| 5 | DF | TUR | Sezgin Coşkun |
| 6 | MF | TUR | Alper Potuk (to Fenerbahçe) |
| 7 | MF | SRB | Andrej Mrkela (loan return to FK Rad) |
| 9 | FW | AUT | Atdhe Nuhiu (loan return to Rapid Wien) |
| 21 | MF | TUR | Burhan Eşer (to Sivasspor, previously on loan at Mersin İdmanyurdu) |
| — | FW | TUR | Adem Sarı (to Altay) |

=== Trabzonspor ===
In:

| No. | Pos. | Nation | Player |
|---|---|---|---|
| 3 | DF | POR | José Bosingwa (from Q.P.R.) |
| 4 | MF | TUR | Aykut Demir (from Gençlerbirliği) |
| 15 | FW | FRA | Florent Malouda (from Chelsea) |
| 17 | FW | TUR | Batuhan Karadeniz (from Eskişehirspor) |
| 19 | MF | TUR | Abdulkadir Özdemir (from 1461 Trabzon) |
| 26 | GK | TUR | Fatih Öztürk (born 1986) (from 1461 Trabzon) |
| 32 | MF | TUR | Yusuf Erdoğan (from 1461 Trabzon) |
| 88 | DF | TUR | Caner Osmanpaşa (from 1461 Trabzon) |
| 99 | DF | TUR | Kadir Keleş (from 1461 Trabzon) |

Out:

| No. | Pos. | Nation | Player |
|---|---|---|---|
| 11 | FW | TUR | Yasin Öztekin (to Kayseri Erciyesspor) |
| 21 | FW | TUR | Halil Altıntop (to FC Augsburg) |
| 29 | GK | TUR | Tolga Zengin (to Beşiktaş) |
| 30 | DF | TUR | Serkan Balcı (to Antalyaspor) |
| — | DF | BRA | Emerson Conceição (to Stade Rennais F.C.) |
| — | DF | SVN | Marek Čech (to Bologna) |
| — | DF | CZE | Ondřej Čelůstka (on loan to Sunderland) |
| — | DF | TUR | Abdullah Karmil (on loan to Ankaraspor) |

=== Gaziantepspor ===
In:

| No. | Pos. | Nation | Player |
|---|---|---|---|
| 4 | MF | BIH | Haris Medunjanin (from Maccabi Tel Aviv, previously on loan) |
| 9 | FW | LTU | Darvydas Šernas (from Zagłębie Lubin, previously on loan) |
| 17 | DF | LTU | Marius Stankevičius (from Lazio) |
| 21 | FW | FRA | Mustafa Durak (from Chamois Niortais) |
| 27 | MF | BIH | Semir Štilić (from Karpaty Lviv) |
| 59 | GK | TUR | Serdar Kulbilge (from Boluspor) |
| 67 | DF | TUR | Uğur Kavuk (from Sivasspor) |
| — | FW | UKR | Artem Milevskyi (from Dynamo Kyiv) |

Out:

| No. | Pos. | Nation | Player |
|---|---|---|---|
| 16 | DF | TUR | Serdar Kurtuluş (to Beşiktaş) |
| 55 | MF | AUT | Yasin Pehlivan (to Bursaspor) |
| 77 | MF | TUR | Oktay Delibalta (loan return to Gençlerbirliği) |
| 91 | DF | TUR | Süleyman Özdamar |
| 99 | FW | CMR | Dorge Kouemaha (loan return to Club Brugge) |
| — | DF | TUR | Rıdvan Şimşek (to Karşıyaka) |
| — | MF | BRA | Wílton Figueiredo |

=== Gençlerbirliği ===
In:

| No. | Pos. | Nation | Player |
|---|---|---|---|
| 2 | DF | TUR | Serkan Yanık (from Mersin İdmanyurdu) |
| 5 | MF | TUR | Nizamettin Çalışkan (from Orduspor) |
| 11 | MF | SWE | Mervan Çelik (from Pescara) |
| 14 | DF | TUR | Ferhat Görgülü (from FC Oss) |
| 19 | MF | CIV | Jean-Jacques Gosso (from Mersin İdmanyurdu) |
| 23 | MF | TUR | Deniz Naki (from SC Paderborn 07) |
| 28 | FW | ROU | Bogdan Stancu (from Orduspor) |
| 31 | MF | SRB | Milan Smiljanić (from Partizan) |
| 61 | DF | TUR | Sedat Bayrak (from Elazığspor) |
| — | MF | TUR | Umit Eminoglu (from Aston Villa) |

Out:

| No. | Pos. | Nation | Player |
|---|---|---|---|
| 4 | MF | TUR | Aykut Demir (to Trabzonspor) |
| 8 | MF | CRC | Randall Azofeifa (to Kayseri Erciyesspor) |
| 18 | FW | BEL | Björn Vleminckx (loan return to Club Brugge) |
| 19 | FW | TUR | Kerim Zengin (to Akhisar Belediyespor) |
| 40 | MF | TUR | Cem Can (to Kayseri Erciyesspor) |
| 88 | MF | TUR | Mustafa Kayabaşı (to Balıkesirspor, previously on loan) |

=== Sivasspor ===
In:

| No. | Pos. | Nation | Player |
|---|---|---|---|
| 2 | DF | TUR | Abdurrahman Dereli (from Kasımpaşa) |
| 12 | DF | BRA | Cicinho (from Sport Club do Recife) |
| 21 | MF | TUR | Burhan Eşer (from Eskişehirspor) |
| 22 | DF | POR | Manuel da Costa (from FC Lokomotiv Moscow) |
| 24 | FW | PER | Hernán Rengifo (from Sporting Cristal) |
| 34 | DF | TUR | Eren Aydın (from Elazığspor) |
| 91 | MF | MAR | Mehdi Taouil (from Heart of Midlothian) |
| 99 | FW | NGA | John Utaka (from Montpellier HSC) |
| — | FW | ALG | Rafik Djebbour (on loan from Olympiacos) |
| — | DF | TUR | Aydın Karabulut (from Elazığspor) |

Out:

| No. | Pos. | Nation | Player |
|---|---|---|---|
| 6 | MF | TUR | Mehmet Nas (to Elazığspor) |
| 7 | FW | BOL | Ricardo Pedriel |
| 11 | MF | TUR | Erman Kılıç (to Galatasaray) |
| 14 | FW | NGA | Michael Eneramo (to Beşiktaş) |
| 19 | DF | SEN | Jacques Faty |
| 33 | DF | CZE | Jan Rajnoch (to Adana Demirspor) |
| 44 | DF | TUR | Erhan Güven (to Kayseri Erciyesspor) |
| 58 | DF | TUR | Hayrettin Yerlikaya |
| 99 | FW | TUR | Sercan Yıldırım (loan return to Galatasaray) |
| — | DF | CZE | Tomáš Rada |

=== Elazığspor ===
In:

| No. | Pos. | Nation | Player |
|---|---|---|---|
| 5 | DF | TUR | İbrahim Kaş (from Bursaspor) |
| 6 | MF | TUR | Mehmet Nas (from Sivasspor) |
| 18 | FW | TUR | Deniz Yılmaz (from Mainz) |
| 19 | FW | TUR | Noyan Öz (from Eintracht Frankfurt II) |
| 61 | DF | TUR | Çağlar Birinci (from Galatasaray) |
| 88 | DF | TUR | Özgür Özkaya (from Beşiktaş) |
| — | MF | TUR | Abdullah Topkara (from Bayrampaşaspor) |

Out:

| No. | Pos. | Nation | Player |
|---|---|---|---|
| 61 | DF | TUR | Sedat Bayrak (to Gençlerbirliği) |

=== Akhisar Belediyespor ===
In:

| No. | Pos. | Nation | Player |
|---|---|---|---|
| 17 | FW | TUR | Mehmet Akyüz (from Beşiktaş) |
| 39 | MF | BIH | Ivan Sesar (from Sarajevo) |
| 80 | FW | BRA | Bruno Mezenga (from Orduspor) |
| 99 | FW | TUR | Kerim Zengin (from Gençlerbirliği) |

Out:

| No. | Pos. | Nation | Player |
|---|---|---|---|
| 8 | FW | NGA | Gideon Adinoy Sani (on loan to Tavşanlı Linyitspor) |
| 17 | FW | GRE | Theofanis Gekas (to Konyaspor) |

=== Karabükspor ===
In:

| No. | Pos. | Nation | Player |
|---|---|---|---|
| 3 | DF | TUR | Eren Güngör (from Kayserispor) |
| 17 | MF | MLI | Samba Sow (from RC Lens) |
| 20 | MF | TUR | Furkan Özçal (on loan from Galatasaray) |
| 24 | DF | TUR | Emre Özkan (from Beşiktaş) |
| 28 | MF | TUR | Beykan Şimşek (on loan from Fenerbahçe) |
| 79 | MF | TUR | Erkan Kaş (on loan from Beşiktaş) |
| 99 | GK | NED | Boy Waterman (from PSV Eindhoven) |
| — | FW | NGA | Joseph Akpala (on loan from Werder Bremen) |
| — | FW | NOR | Morten Gamst Pedersen (from Blackburn Rovers) |
| — | DF | FRA | Sébastien Puygrenier (from AS Nancy) |

Out:

| No. | Pos. | Nation | Player |
|---|---|---|---|
| 5 | DF | TUR | Anıl Karaer (to Mersin İdmanyurdu) |
| 6 | MF | TUR | Kağan Söylemezgiller (to Çaykur Rizespor) |
| 12 | DF | CMR | Armand Deumi (to Gaziantep B.B.) |
| 14 | MF | TUR | Güven Varol (to Mersin İdmanyurdu) |
| 19 | GK | CRO | Vjekoslav Tomić |
| 20 | DF | CRO | Anthony Šerić |
| 21 | FW | JAM | Luton Shelton (to FC Volga Nizhny Novgorod) |
| 30 | MF | TUR | Selim Teber (to Ankaragücü) |
| 68 | DF | TUR | Hakan Söyler (to Elazığspor) |
| 78 | FW | TUR | Bertul Kocabaş (to Eskişehirspor) |
| — | MF | TUR | Umut Sözen (to Manisaspor) |
| — | MF | TUR | Birol Hikmet (to Adana Demirspor) |

=== Kayseri Erciyesspor ===
In:

| No. | Pos. | Nation | Player |
|---|---|---|---|
| 9 | FW | TUR | Yasin Öztekin (from Trabzonspor) |
| 10 | MF | CRC | Randall Azofeifa (from Gençlerbirliği) |
| 14 | MF | CMR | Georges Mandjeck (from Auxerre) |
| 17 | FW | TUR | Sinan Kaloğlu (from Elazığspor) |
| 18 | FW | BEL | Björn Vleminckx (from Club Brugge) |
| 20 | MF | TUR | Kerim Avcı (from Rot-Weiss Essen) |
| 27 | FW | TUR | Volkan Okumak (from SC Wiedenbrück 2000) |
| 32 | MF | TUR | Murat Akın (from Konyaspor) |
| 40 | MF | TUR | Cem Can (from Gençlerbirliği) |
| 55 | MF | CRC | Hansell Arauz (from Cartaginés) |
| 70 | GK | SRB | Bojan Jorgačević (from Club Brugge) |
| — | DF | TUR | Uğur Demirkol (from Ankaragücü) |

Out:

| No. | Pos. | Nation | Player |

=== Çaykur Rizespor ===
In:

| No. | Pos. | Nation | Player |
|---|---|---|---|
| 3 | DF | CIV | Ousmane Viera (from CS Pandurii Târgu Jiu) |
| 4 | FW | TUR | Koray Altınay (from SSV Jahn Regensburg) |
| 6 | MF | TUR | Kağan Söylemezgiller (from Kardemir Karabükspor) |
| 9 | FW | CMR | Léonard Kweuke (from Sparta Prague) |
| 14 | MF | GLP | Ludovic Sylvestre (from Blackpool) |
| 15 | FW | NGA | Uche Kalu (from Enyimba, previously on loan) |
| 17 | FW | TUR | Hurşut Meriç (from Gençlerbirliği) |
| 22 | DF | TUR | Cenk Güvenç (from Atlético Madrid B) |
| 35 | GK | TUR | Necati Yılmaz (from Karşıyaka) |
| 53 | FW | IRQ | Ali Adnan Kadhim (from Baghdad FC) |
| 66 | MF | TUR | Kıvanç Karakaş (from Şanlıurfaspor) |
| 81 | GK | POL | Mariusz Pawełek (from Polonia Warsaw) |
| 88 | FW | TUR | Tevfik Köse (from İstanbul B.B.) |
| — | DF | NGA | Godfrey Oboabona (from Sunshine Stars) |

Out:

| No. | Pos. | Nation | Player |
|---|---|---|---|
| 1 | GK | KAZ | David Loria |
| 7 | FW | TUR | Mehmet Al |
| 8 | MF | TUR | Cumhur Yılmaztürk |
| 12 | MF | EGY | Hossam Hassan (loan return to Al Masry) |
| 18 | DF | KAZ | Samat Smakov |
| 24 | DF | TUR | Serhat Akyüz |
| 35 | DF | TUR | Murat Sözgelmez |
| 41 | GK | TUR | Fırat Kocaoğlu |
| 70 | FW | TUR | Emre Torun (loan return to Antalyaspor) |
| 90 | DF | TUR | Çetin Güngör |
| — | FW | TUR | Çağrı Yarkın |
| — | MF | TUR | Şahinali Terzi |
| — | FW | TUR | İlyas Çakmak |
| — | FW | GAM | Ousman Jallow |
| — | DF | TUR | Onur Güney |

=== Konyaspor ===
In:

| No. | Pos. | Nation | Player |
|---|---|---|---|
| 8 | MF | TUR | Ali Çamdalı (from Orduspor) |
| 10 | FW | CHA | Ezechiel Ndouasel (on loan from FC Terek Grozny) |
| 20 | MF | CMR | Marc Kibong Mbamba (from Adanaspor) |
| 23 | FW | ISL | Gunnar Heiðar Þorvaldsson (from IFK Norrköping) |
| 28 | GK | CMR | Charles Itandje (on loan from PAOK) |
| 32 | MF | CZE | Tomáš Borek (from Bohemians 1905) |
| 44 | DF | CRO | Elvis Kokalović (from Slaven Belupo) |
| 54 | DF | TUR | Mehmet Uslu (from Kartalspor) |
| 82 | MF | TUR | Vedat Bora (from Gebzespor) |
| 99 | FW | TUR | Hasan Kabze (from Orduspor) |
| — | DF | TUR | Ergün Teber (from Antalyaspor) |
| — | FW | GRE | Theofanis Gekas (from Akhisar Belediyespor) |

Out:

| No. | Pos. | Nation | Player |
|---|---|---|---|
| — | DF | TUR | Erkan Sekman |
| — | MF | POR | Neca |
| — | FW | TUR | Semih Aydilek |
| — | FW | TUR | Atilla Yildirim |
| — | DF | TUR | Murat Kalkan |
| — | GK | TUR | Deniz Öksüz |
| — | FW | NOR | Sjoerd Ars (loan return to Levski Sofia) |
| — | MF | TUR | Murat Akın (to Kayseri Erciyesspor) |

== See also ==
- 2013–14 Süper Lig
- 2013–14 TFF First League
