= 2013–14 Süper Lig =

56th season of top-tier Turkish football

Süper Lig
- Season: 2013–14
- Champions: Fenerbahçe; 19th title
- Relegated: Elazığspor; Antalyaspor; Kayserispor
- Champions League: Galatasaray; Beşiktaş
- Europa League: Trabzonspor; Karabükspor; Bursaspor
- Matches: 306
- Goals: 809 (2.64 per match)
- Top goalscorer: Aatif Chahechouhe (17)
- Biggest home win: Galatasaray 6–0 Bursaspor
- Biggest away win: Kayseri Erciyesspor 0–5 Trabzonspor
- Highest scoring: Kasımpaşa 6–2 Sivasspor
- Longest winning run: Fenerbahçe (5); Kasımpaşa
- Longest unbeaten run: Fenerbahçe (14)
- Longest winless run: Çaykur Rizespor (15)
- Longest losing run: Elazığspor (10)
- Highest attendance: 76,127 (Beşiktaş – Galatasaray, Atatürk Olympic Stadium, 22 September 2013)
- Average attendance: 12,131

The 2013–14 Süper Lig (known as the Spor Toto Süper Lig for sponsorship reasons) was the 56th season of the Süper Lig, the highest tier football league of Turkey. The season began on 17 August 2013. Galatasaray were the defending champions, but Fenerbahçe matched their league title record of 19 after drawing 0–0 with Çaykur Rizespor on 27 April.

== Teams ==
Location of teams in 2013–14 Süper Lig

İstanbul BB, Orduspor and Mersin İdman Yurdu were relegated at the end of the 2012–13 season after finishing in the bottom three places of the standings. İstanbul B.B. was at top level for six years, Orduspor and Mersin İY returned to second level after two years. The relegated teams were replaced by 2012–13 TFF First League champions Kayseri Erciyesspor, runners-up Çaykur Rizespor and play-off winners Konyaspor. They returned to the top division after six, five and two years, respectively.

=== Team overview ===
Team	Home city	Head coach	Captain	Kit manufacturer	Shirt sponsor	Stadium	Capacity
Akhisar Belediyespor	Manisa	(Turkey) Hamza Hamzaoğlu	(Turkey) Emrah Eren	Puma	Köfteci Ramiz	Manisa 19 Mayıs Stadium	16,597
Beşiktaş	Istanbul	(Croatia) Slaven Bilić	(Czech Republic) Tomáš Sivok	Adidas	Toyota	Atatürk Olympic Stadium	76,092
Bursaspor	Bursa	(Turkey) İrfan Buz	(Turkey) İbrahim Öztürk	Puma		Bursa Atatürk Stadium	25,661
Çaykur Rizespor	Rize	(Turkey) Uğur Tütüneker	(Romania) Florin Cernat	Lotto	Çaykur	Yeni Rize Şehir Stadı	15,485
Eskişehirspor	Eskişehir	(Turkey) Ertuğrul Sağlam	(Sweden) Erkan Zengin	Nike	ETİ	Eskişehir Atatürk Stadium	13,520
Fenerbahçe	Istanbul	(Turkey) Ersun Yanal	(Turkey) Emre Belözoğlu	Adidas	Türk Telekom	Şükrü Saracoğlu Stadium	50,509
Galatasaray	Istanbul	(Italy) Roberto Mancini	(Turkey) Selçuk İnan	Nike	Türk Telekom	Türk Telekom Arena	52,652
Gaziantepspor	Gaziantep	(Turkey) Tahsin Tam	(Turkey) Bekir Ozan Has	Nike		Kamil Ocak Stadium	16,981
Gençlerbirliği	Ankara	(Turkey) Mehmet Özdilek	(Turkey) Ramazan Köse	Lotto	ICK Yapı	Ankara 19 Mayıs Stadium	19,209
Karabükspor	Karabük	(Turkey) Tolunay Kafkas	(Turkey) İlhan Parlak	Lescon	Kardemir	Dr. Necmettin Şeyhoğlu Stadium	14,200
Kasımpaşa	Istanbul	(Georgia (country)) Shota Arveladze	(Turkey) Yalçın Ayhan	Adidas	UCZ	Recep Tayyip Erdoğan Stadium	14,234
Kayseri Erciyesspor	Kayseri	(Turkey) Hikmet Karaman	(Turkey) Cem Can	Adidas	Türkiye Petrolleri	Kadir Has Stadium	32,864
Kayserispor	Kayseri	(Turkey) Ertuğrul Seçme	(Turkey) Abdullah Durak	Adidas		Kadir Has Stadium	32,864
Konyaspor	Konya	(Turkey) Mesut Bakkal	(Turkey) Erdal Kılıçaslan	Hummel	Torku	Konya Atatürk Stadium	22,559
Antalyaspor	Antalya	(Turkey) Fuat Çapa	(Turkey) Uğur İnceman	Puma	Çaykur	Akdeniz University Stadium	7,083
Elazığspor	Elazığ	(Turkey) Okan Buruk	(Turkey) Çağlar Birinci	Umbro	Kolin	Elazığ Atatürk Stadium	13,923
Sivasspor	Sivas	(Brazil) Roberto Carlos	(Turkey) Kadir Bekmezci	Adidas	Marka Gida	Sivas 4 Eylül Stadium	14,998
Trabzonspor	Trabzon	(Turkey) Hami Mandıralı	(Turkey) Onur Kıvrak	Nike	Türk Telekom	Hüseyin Avni Aker Stadium	24,169

=== Managerial changes ===
Team	Outgoing manager	Manner of departure	Date of vacancy	Replaced by	Date of appointment
Karabükspor	(Turkey) Mesut Bakkal	Sacked	6 May 2013	(Turkey) Tolunay Kafkas	8 July 2013
Gençlerbirliği	(Turkey) Fuat Çapa	Contract expired	31 May 2013	(Turkey) Metin Diyadin	14 June 2013
Kayseri Erciyesspor	(Turkey) Osman Özköylü	Mutual agreement	11 May 2013	(Turkey) Fuat Çapa	1 June 2013
Elazığspor	(Turkey) Yılmaz Vural	Resignation	19 May 2013	(Norway) Trond Sollied	24 June 2013
Beşiktaş	(Turkey) Samet Aybaba	Sacked	20 May 2013	(Croatia) Slaven Bilić	25 June 2013
Sivasspor	(Turkey) Rıza Çalımbay	Resignation	20 May 2013	(Brazil) Roberto Carlos	31 May 2013
Çaykur Rizespor	(Turkey) Mustafa Denizli	Resignation	24 May 2013	(Turkey) Rıza Çalımbay	29 May 2013
Trabzonspor	(Turkey) Tolunay Kafkas	Sacked	27 May 2013	(Turkey) Mustafa Reşit Akçay	27 May 2013
Antalyaspor	(Turkey) Mehmet Özdilek	Resignation	28 May 2013	(Turkey) Samet Aybaba	28 June 2013
Fenerbahçe	(Turkey) Aykut Kocaman	Resignation	29 May 2013	(Turkey) Ersun Yanal	28 June 2013
Eskişehirspor	(Turkey) Ersun Yanal	Mutual agreement	25 June 2013	(Turkey) Ertuğrul Sağlam	28 June 2013
Bursaspor	(Turkey) Hikmet Karaman	Sacked	9 August 2013	(Germany) Christoph Daum	11 August 2013
Galatasaray	(Turkey) Fatih Terim	Sacked	24 September 2013	(Italy) Roberto Mancini	30 September 2013
Gaziantepspor	(Turkey) Bülent Uygun	Sacked	15 November 2013	(Turkey) Sergen Yalçın	15 November 2013
Konyaspor	(Turkey) Uğur Tütüneker	Sacked	13 December 2013	(Turkey) Mesut Bakkal	16 December 2013
Kayseri Erciyesspor	(Turkey) Fuat Çapa	Sacked	21 December 2013	(Turkey) Hikmet Karaman	21 December 2013
Kayserispor	(Croatia) Robert Prosinečki	Sacked	31 December 2013	(Portugal) Domingos Paciência	17 January 2014
Çaykur Rizespor	(Turkey) Rıza Çalımbay	Resigned	9 February 2014	(Turkey) Uğur Tütüneker	15 February 2014
Trabzonspor	(Turkey) Mustafa Reşit Akçay	Resigned	10 February 2014	(Turkey) Hami Mandıralı	18 February 2014
Antalyaspor	(Turkey) Samet Aybaba	Resigned	10 March 2014	(Turkey) Fuat Çapa	17 March 2014
Kayserispor	(Portugal) Domingos Paciência	Sacked	17 March 2014	(Turkey) Ertuğrul Seçme	17 March 2014
Gaziantepspor	(Turkey) Sergen Yalçın	Resigned	25 March 2014	(Turkey) Tahsin Tam	26 March 2014
Bursaspor	(Germany) Christoph Daum	Sacked	25 March 2014	(Turkey) İrfan Buz	26 March 2014

=== Foreign players ===
Club	Player 1	Player 2	Player 3	Player 4	Player 5	Player 6	Player 7	Player 8	Player 9	Player 10	Former Players
Akhisarspor	(Bosnia and Herzegovina) Ivan Sesar	(Brazil) Bruno Mezenga	(Germany) Alessandro Riedle	(Nigeria) Gideon Sani	(Portugal) Wato Kuaté	(Senegal) Ibrahima Sonko	(Senegal) Oumar Niasse				(Argentina) Luciano Guaycochea
Antalyaspor	(Cameroon) Eyong Enoh	(Cameroon) Joseph Boum	(England) Anton Ferdinand	(Nigeria) Isaac Promise	(Senegal) Lamine Diarra	(Slovenia) Sašo Fornezzi	(Spain) Natxo Insa				(Czech Republic) Milan Baroš (Czech Republic) Petr Janda (Morocco) Ismaïl Aissati
Beşiktaş	(Brazil) Ramon Motta	(Cameroon) Dany Nounkeu	(Canada) Atiba Hutchinson	(Colombia) Pedro Franco	(Czech Republic) Tomáš Sivok	(France) Julien Escudé	(Portugal) Hugo Almeida	(Portugal) Manuel Fernandes	(Slovakia) Filip Hološko	(United States) Jermaine Jones	(Brazil) Dentinho (Nigeria) Michael Eneramo
Bursaspor	(Argentina) Fernando Belluschi	(Argentina) Renato Civelli	(Brazil) Fernandão	(Brazil) Renato Cajá	(Chile) Sebastián Pinto	(France) Sébastien Frey	(Morocco) Michaël Chrétien	(Nigeria) Taye Taiwo	(Slovakia) Stanislav Šesták		(Argentina) Pablo Batalla
Çaykur Rizespor	(Cameroon) Léonard Kweuke	(Democratic Republic of the Congo) Lomana LuaLua	(France) Ludovic Sylvestre	(Iraq) Ali Adnan	(Ivory Coast) Ousmane Viera	(Nigeria) Godfrey Oboabona	(Romania) Florin Cernat	(Somalia) Liban Abdi			(Nigeria) Uche Kalu (Poland) Mariusz Pawełek (Slovakia) David Depetris
Elazığspor	(Argentina) Franco Cángele	(Bosnia and Herzegovina) Ognjen Vranješ	(Brazil) Fábio Bilica	(Chile) Rodrigo Tello	(Croatia) Vanja Iveša	(Morocco) Youssouf Hadji	(Netherlands) Marvin Zeegelaar	(Senegal) Pape Habib Sow	(Senegal) Tidiane Sane		(England) Luke Moore (Netherlands) Roland Alberg (Spain) Vitolo
Fenerbahçe	(Brazil) Cristian Baroni	(Cameroon) Pierre Webó	(Czech Republic) Michal Kadlec	(Netherlands) Dirk Kuyt	(Nigeria) Emmanuel Emenike	(Portugal) Bruno Alves	(Portugal) Raul Meireles	(Senegal) Moussa Sow	(Sweden) Samuel Holmén		(Nigeria) Joseph Yobo
Galatasaray	(Argentina) Lucas Ontivero	(Argentina) Guillermo Burdisso	(Bosnia and Herzegovina) Izet Hajrović	(Brazil) Alex Telles	(Brazil) Felipe Melo	(Cameroon) Aurélien Chedjou	(Ivory Coast) Didier Drogba	(Ivory Coast) Emmanuel Eboué	(Netherlands) Wesley Sneijder	(Uruguay) Fernando Muslera	(Cameroon) Dany Nounkeu (Morocco) Nordin Amrabat (Portugal) Bruma (Spain) Albert Riera
Gaziantepspor	(Bosnia and Herzegovina) Haris Medunjanin	(Burkina Faso) Abdou Traoré	(Cameroon) Gilles Binya	(Lithuania) Marius Stankevičius	(Lithuania) Žydrūnas Karčemarskas	(Slovakia) Marek Sapara					(Bosnia and Herzegovina) Semir Štilić (Lithuania) Darvydas Šernas (Montenegro) Ivan Kecojević (Ukraine) Artem Milevskyi
Gençlerbirliği	(Bosnia and Herzegovina) Ermin Zec	(Belarus) Artsyom Radzkow	(Croatia) Ante Kulušić	(Ivory Coast) Jean-Jacques Gosso	(Romania) Bogdan Stancu	(Serbia) Duško Tošić	(Serbia) Nemanja Tomić	(Serbia) Radosav Petrović	(Sweden) Johan Dahlin		(Serbia) Milan Smiljanić
Karabükspor	(Algeria) Jugurtha Hamroun	(Brazil) Jones Carioca	(Democratic Republic of the Congo) Larrys Mabiala	(France) Sébastien Puygrenier	(Netherlands) Boy Waterman	(Nigeria) Joseph Akpala	(Nigeria) Michael Eneramo	(Senegal) Samba Sow			(Democratic Republic of the Congo) Lomana LuaLua (Norway) Morten Gamst Pedersen
Kasımpaşa	(Argentina) Matías Fritzler	(Argentina) Óscar Scarione	(Ivory Coast) Kafoumba Coulibaly	(Netherlands) Ryan Babel	(Netherlands) Ryan Donk	(Portugal) André Castro	(Sweden) Andreas Isaksson	(Uruguay) Tabaré Viudez			
Kayseri Erciyesspor	(Belgium) Björn Vleminckx	(Bosnia and Herzegovina) Senijad Ibričić	(Cameroon) Georges Mandjeck	(Costa Rica) Randall Azofeifa	(France) Yakup Ramazan Zorlu	(Mali) Bakaye Traoré	(Portugal) Edinho	(Senegal) Kader Mangane	(Senegal) Pape Diakhaté	(Serbia) Bojan Jorgačević	(Algeria) Ziri Hammar (Costa Rica) Hansell Arauz (Senegal) Insa Sylla
Kayserispor	(Argentina) Pablo Mouche	(Brazil) Bobô	(Czech Republic) Ondřej Vaněk	(Georgia (country)) Zurab Khizanishvili	(Greece) Alexandros Tziolis	(Montenegro) Marko Simić	(Netherlands) Diego Biseswar	(Portugal) Henrique Sereno	(Serbia) Srđan Mijailović		(Brazil) Cleyton (Brazil) Jajá Coelho
Konyaspor	(Angola) Djalma	(Belarus) Alexander Hleb	(Cameroon) Charles Itandje	(Cameroon) Marc Kibong Mbamba	(Croatia) Elvis Kokalović	(Czech Republic) Tomáš Borek	(Greece) Theofanis Gekas	(Iceland) Gunnar Heidar Thorvaldsson	(Serbia) Jagoš Vuković		(Chad) Ezechiel N'Douassel (Portugal) Cristóvão
Sivasspor	(Brazil) Cicinho	(Brazil) Pedro Oldoni	(Czech Republic) Jakub Navrátil	(Morocco) Aatif Chahechouhe	(Morocco) Manuel da Costa	(Morocco) Mehdi Taouil	(Nigeria) John Utaka				(Algeria) Rafik Djebbour (Bolivia) Ricardo Pedriel (Canada) Milan Borjan (Peru) Hernán Rengifo (Poland) Kamil Grosicki
Trabzonspor	(Argentina) Gustavo Colman	(Austria) Marc Janko	(Brazil) Paulo Henrique	(France) Florent Malouda	(Ivory Coast) Sol Bamba	(Poland) Adrian Mierzejewski	(Portugal) José Bosingwa	(Romania) Alexandru Bourceanu			(Brazil) Alanzinho (Ivory Coast) Didier Zokora

== League table ==
Pos	Team	Pld	W	D	L	GF	GA	GD	Pts	Qualification or relegation
1	Fenerbahçe (C)	34	23	5	6	74	33	+41	74	(Note: Although Fenerbahçe would have qualified for the Champions League group stage as champions, they were barred from participating in next season's European competitions due to UEFA sanctioning because of the 2011 Turkish football match-fixing scandal, with this season also counting for that ban. As a result, the runners-up of the league (Galatasaray) entered the Champions League group stage instead of the third qualifying round, the third-placed team of the league (Beşiktaş) entered the Champions League third qualifying round instead of the Europa League play-off round, and the fourth-placed team of the league (Trabzonspor) entered the Europa League play-off round instead of the third qualifying round.)
2	Galatasaray	34	18	11	5	59	32	+27	65	Qualification for the Champions League group stage
3	Beşiktaş	34	17	11	6	53	33	+20	62	Qualification for the Champions League third qualifying round
4	Trabzonspor	34	14	11	9	53	41	+12	53 (Note: Trabzonspor finished ahead of Sivasspor on head-to-head record: Trabzonspor–Sivasspor 0–0, Sivasspor–Trabzonspor 0–4.)	Qualification for the Europa League play-off round
5	Sivasspor	34	16	5	13	60	55	+5	53	(Note: Sivasspor were banned from European competitions by UEFA due to match-fixing. As a result, their Europa League spot was passed down the league to the next eligible team (Karabükspor).)
6	Kasımpaşa (Note: Kasımpaşa, Konyaspor and Gaziantepspor were not granted a UEFA license by the Turkish Football Federation, and could therefore not qualify for European competitions.)	34	13	12	9	56	39	+17	51	
7	Karabükspor	34	13	11	10	33	34	−1	50	Qualification for the Europa League third qualifying round
8	Bursaspor	34	12	10	12	40	46	−6	46	Qualification for the Europa League second qualifying round (Note: Since the winners of the 2013–14 Turkish Cup, Galatasaray, qualified for European competition based on league position, the spot awarded to the cup winners (Europa League second qualifying round) was originally passed to the cup runners-up, Eskişehirspor. However, Eskişehirspor were banned from European competitions by UEFA due to match-fixing. As a result, their Europa League spot was passed down the league to the next eligible team (Bursaspor).)
9	Gençlerbirliği	34	13	6	15	39	43	−4	45	
10	Akhisar Belediyespor	34	12	8	14	44	55	−11	44	
11	Konyaspor	34	11	9	14	48	45	+3	42 (Note: Konyaspor finished ahead of Eskişehirspor and Çaykur Rizespor on head-to-head points: Konyaspor: 7 pts, Eskişehirspor: 5 pts, Çaykur Rizespor: 4 pts.)	
12	Eskişehirspor	34	10	12	12	33	35	−2	42	
13	Çaykur Rizespor	34	10	12	12	43	43	0	42	
14	Kayseri Erciyesspor	34	10	7	17	34	50	−16	37 (Note: Kayseri Erciyesspor finished ahead of Gaziantepspor on head-to-head away goals scored: Kayseri Erciyesspor–Gaziantepspor 1–0, Gaziantepspor–Kayseri Erciyesspor 2–1.)	
15	Gaziantepspor	34	10	7	17	38	58	−20	37	
16	Elazığspor (R)	34	10	4	20	38	62	−24	34	Relegation to TFF First League
17	Antalyaspor (R)	34	6	13	15	34	47	−13	31	Relegation to TFF First League
18	Kayserispor (R)	34	7	8	19	30	58	−28	29	Relegation to TFF First League

Source: tff.org
Rules for classification: 1) points; 2) goal difference; 3) number of goals scored.
(C) Champions; (R) Relegated

== Results ==
Home \ Away	AKH	ANT	BEŞ	BUR	ÇAY	ELZ	ESK	FEN	GAL	GAZ	GEN	KRB	KSM	KEC	KAY	KON	SİV	TRA
Akhisar Belediyespor		1–0	2–3	2–1	2–3	3–1	0–0	3–1	2–1	2–0	3–1	0–1	1–3	0–2	2–2	2–1	2–1	3–0
Antalyaspor	1–0		2–0	1–2	1–2	1–2	0–0	1–2	2–2	0–1	2–3	0–0	1–1	0–0	2–2	1–1	1–2	0–2
Beşiktaş	3–0	0–0		1–0	0–0	4–1	1–0	1–1	0–3 (Note: Awarded)	2–0	1–1	0–0	2–1	3–2	2–1	3–1	1–1	2–0
Bursaspor	0–0	1–1	0–3		2–0	1–0	3–1	2–3	1–1	3–1	0–0	1–0	1–1	3–1	2–0	1–2	4–3	2–2
Çaykur Rizespor	0–0	1–2	2–2	2–1		3–1	0–0	1–2	1–1	5–1	1–0	0–1	0–0	2–1	0–2	3–1	1–1	0–0
Elazığspor	2–1	4–1	0–1	1–2	1–0		0–2	1–1	0–1	2–1	1–2	2–2	0–0	0–1	3–0	2–0	2–4	0–0
Eskişehirspor	2–0	2–1	0–1	2–0	4–1	1–0		2–1	0–0	2–0	0–1	0–0	0–0	0–1	1–4	1–1	2–2	2–2
Fenerbahçe	4–0	4–1	3–3	3–0	0–0	4–0	1–0		2–0	3–1	2–0	4–0	2–1	2–1	5–1	2–1	5–2	0–0
Galatasaray	6–1	1–1	1–0	6–0	1–1	2–0	3–0	1–0		2–1	3–2	2–1	0–4	2–1	0–1	2–1	2–1	2–1
Gaziantepspor	1–1	0–0	1–2	0–0	2–5	3–1	1–1	0–3	0–0		0–1	3–0	2–2	2–1	2–1	3–3	0–4	3–2
Gençlerbirliği	3–0	1–2	1–0	1–0	3–1	3–1	2–0	0–1	1–1	1–3		1–2	1–3	0–0	1–1	2–2	2–1	3–2
Kardemir Karabükspor	0–2	1–1	1–0	0–1	2–1	3–1	0–0	2–1	0–0	0–1	1–0		2–0	0–0	1–0	2–2	1–0	2–2
Kasımpaşa	2–4	2–0	0–3	1–1	1–1	4–0	0–2	2–3	1–1	3–0	1–2	0–0		3–0	3–1	1–3	6–2	3–2
Kayseri Erciyesspor	1–0	1–3	2–4	1–1	1–1	3–0	0–2	1–2	1–3	1–0	1–0	2–1	0–3		1–1	1–0	1–1	0–5
Kayserispor	0–0	3–1	0–3	2–0	0–2	1–3	1–1	0–2	2–4	0–1	1–0	1–3	0–0	0–4		0–0	1–0	0–1
Konyaspor	4–0	2–0	1–1	0–1	2–1	2–3	4–1	3–2	0–0	0–1	1–0	2–3	1–2	1–0	3–0		3–0	0–0
Sivasspor	3–1	0–3	3–0	2–1	3–1	1–3	3–2	2–0	2–1	3–2	2–0	3–1	1–2	2–0	3–0	2–0		0–4
Trabzonspor	2–4	2–1	1–1	2–2	2–1	4–0	1–0	0–3 (Note: Awarded)	1–4	2–1	3–0	1–0	0–0	3–1	2–1	2–0	0–0	

Source: tff.org (in Turkish)
Legend: Blue = home team win; Yellow = draw; Red = away team win.

== Positions by round ==
The following table represents the teams position after each round in the competition.

Team ╲ Round	1	2	3	4	5	6	7	8	9	10	11	12	13	14	15	16	17	18	19	20	21	22	23	24	25	26	27	28	29	30	31	32	33	34
Fenerbahçe	11	7	3	2	1	1	1	1	1	1	1	1	1	1	1	1	1	1	1	1	1	1	1	1	1	1	1	1	1	1	1	1	1	1
Galatasaray	6	3	7	7	4	5	8	6	5	4	6	5	4	4	4	3	2	2	2	2	3	2	2	2	2	3	2	2	3	3	2	2	2	2
Beşiktaş	2	1	1	1	2	3	2	2	3	5	4	3	3	3	2	2	3	3	3	3	2	3	3	3	3	2	3	3	2	2	3	3	3	3
Trabzonspor	16	12	15	10	7	4	5	5	10	6	7	6	5	7	7	8	7	6	8	9	9	7	7	7	4	4	6	4	4	4	4	4	5	4
Sivasspor	13	5	12	9	11	8	7	9	6	3	3	4	6	6	5	6	4	4	4	4	4	4	4	4	6	6	4	7	5	5	5	5	4	5
Kasımpaşa	16	7	5	8	6	9	6	3	2	2	2	2	2	2	3	4	5	5	5	7	8	6	6	5	8	7	5	6	7	6	6	6	6	6
Karabükspor	2	2	2	5	8	10	12	13	13	13	13	8	10	8	8	7	8	9	7	5	5	5	8	8	9	8	7	5	6	7	7	7	7	7
Bursaspor	16	18	10	15	16	16	13	11	9	11	11	11	8	10	9	9	10	8	10	10	10	10	10	9	11	12	12	11	11	10	9	10	10	8
Gençlerbirliği	13	4	11	11	14	17	18	18	15	12	12	13	15	15	14	13	11	11	12	13	13	13	15	13	12	11	9	9	10	8	8	8	8	9
Akhisar Bld.	1	10	4	6	5	6	4	8	7	8	8	9	11	9	11	10	9	10	9	6	7	9	5	6	7	9	10	10	8	9	10	9	9	10
Konyaspor	5	11	12	17	12	14	11	12	12	14	14	14	12	13	13	14	13	14	13	11	11	11	12	12	13	13	13	13	13	14	12	12	11	11
Eskişehirspor	2	5	8	12	9	7	9	7	4	7	5	7	7	5	6	5	6	7	6	8	6	8	9	10	5	5	8	8	9	11	11	11	12	12
Rizespor	7	9	6	3	3	2	3	4	8	9	9	10	13	14	15	15	15	15	15	16	16	16	16	16	16	15	14	14	14	12	13	13	13	13
Erciyesspor	9	17	17	13	13	13	16	16	17	18	15	15	16	16	16	17	18	17	18	17	17	17	17	17	17	17	17	15	16	16	15	14	14	14
Gaziantepspor	12	15	18	18	18	18	14	14	14	15	16	16	14	12	10	11	12	12	11	12	12	12	11	11	10	10	11	12	12	13	14	15	15	15
Elazığspor	15	16	9	4	10	11	15	15	16	16	17	18	18	18	18	18	16	16	16	15	15	15	13	14	14	16	15	17	15	15	16	16	16	16
Antalyaspor	9	14	16	16	17	12	10	10	11	10	10	12	9	11	12	12	14	13	14	14	14	14	14	15	15	14	16	16	17	17	17	18	17	17
Kayserispor	7	12	14	14	15	15	17	17	18	17	18	17	17	17	17	16	17	18	17	18	18	18	18	18	18	18	18	18	18	18	18	17	18	18

Source: tff.org (in Turkish)

== Attendances ==
Rank	Team	Matches	Stadium Closure	Total	Average	Real Average
1	Fenerbahçe	17	3	588,280	34,605	42,020
2	Galatasaray	17	2	565,903	33,288	37,727
3	Beşiktaş	17	5	317,600	18,682	26,467
4	Bursaspor	17	6	241,400	14,200	21,945
5	Trabzonspor	17	4	217,088	12,770	16,699
6	Konyaspor	17	1	179,300	10,547	11,206
7	Eskişehirspor	17	4	139,212	8,189	10,709
8	Kayseri Erciyesspor	17	-	175,750	10,338	10,338
9	Kayserispor	17	2	138,100	8,124	9,207
10	Gaziantepspor	17	1	147,000	8,647	9,188
11	Gençlerbirliği	17	-	151,941	8,938	8,938
12	Sivasspor	17	-	147,210	8,659	8,659
13	Çaykur Rizespor	17	-	141,708	8,336	8,336
14	Elazığspor	17	1	113,000	6,647	7,062
15	Akhisar Belediyespor	17	-	113,843	6,697	6,697
16	Kasımpaşa	17	2	87,200	5,129	5,813
17	Antalyaspor	17	-	74,250	4,368	4,368
18	Karabükspor	17	-	68,318	4,019	4,019

- Updated to games played on 18 May 2014

== Statistics ==
=== Top goalscorers ===
As of 18 May 2014.

Rank	Player	Club	Goals
1	(Morocco) Aatif Chahechouhe	Sivasspor	17
2	(Turkey) Burak Yılmaz	Galatasaray	16
3	(Argentina) Ezequiel Scarione	Kasımpaşa	15
3	(Senegal) Moussa Sow	Fenerbahçe	15
5	(Romania) Bogdan Stancu	Gençlerbirliği	13
5	(Turkey) Cenk Tosun	Gaziantepspor	13
5	(Portugal) Hugo Almeida	Beşiktaş	13
5	(Brazil) Paulo Henrique	Trabzonspor	13
5	(Greece) Theofanis Gekas	Konyaspor	13
10	(Senegal) Oumar Niasse	Akhisar Belediyespor	12
10	(Turkey) Burhan Eşer	Sivasspor	12
10	(Azerbaijan) Deniz Yılmaz	Elazığspor	12
10	(Nigeria) Emmanuel Emenike	Fenerbahçe	12
10	(Netherlands) Wesley Sneijder	Galatasaray	12

=== Top assists ===
As of 18 May 2014.

Rank	Player	Club	Assists
1	(Brazil) Cicinho	Sivasspor	14
2	(Turkey) Caner Erkin	Fenerbahçe	10
2	(Uruguay) Tabaré Viúdez	Kasımpaşa	10
4	(Poland) Adrian Mierzejewski	Trabzonspor	8
4	(Turkey) Güray Vural	Akhisar Belediyespor	8
4	(Turkey) Olcay Şahan	Beşiktaş	8
4	(Greece) Theofanis Gekas	Konyaspor	8

=== Hat-tricks ===
Player	For	Against	Result	Date
(Senegal) Moussa Sow	Fenerbahçe	Sanica Boru Elazığspor	4–0	21 September 2013
(Netherlands) Wesley Sneijder	Galatasaray	Bursaspor	6–0	2 February 2014
(Turkey) Mehmet Akyüz	Akhisar Belediyespor	Trabzonspor	4–2	9 February 2014
(Brazil) Fernandão	Bursaspor	Sivasspor	4–3	6 April 2014
(Greece) Theofanis Gekas	Konyaspor	Akhisar Belediyespor	4–0	27 April 2014

=== Clean sheets ===
==== Player ====
As of 9 March 2014.

Rank	Player	Club	Match Played	Clean sheets
1	(Turkey) Tolga Zengin	Beşiktaş	24	11
2	(Belgium) Ruud Boffin	Eskişehirspor	24	10
3	(Turkey) Onur Kıvrak	Trabzonspor	22	9

==== Club ====
- Most clean sheets: 13
  - Beşiktaş
- Fewest clean sheets: 5
  - Elazığspor

== Awards ==
=== Team of the Season ===
Team of the Season
Goalkeeper	(Turkey) Onur Kıvrak (Trabzonspor)			
Defenders	(Turkey) Gökhan Gönül (Fenerbahçe)	(Democratic Republic of the Congo) Larrys Mabiala (Kardemir Karabükspor)	(Ghana) Jerry Akaminko (Eskişehirspor)	(Turkey) Caner Erkin (Fenerbahçe)
Midfielders	(Turkey) Burhan Eşer (Sivasspor)	(Argentina) Óscar Scarione (Kasımpaşa)	(Netherlands) Wesley Sneijder (Galatasaray)	(Turkey) Olcan Adın (Trabzonspor)
Forwards	(Senegal) Moussa Sow (Fenerbahçe)	(Morocco) Aatif Chahechouhe (Sivasspor)		
