= Ethem Pülgir =

Turkish footballer

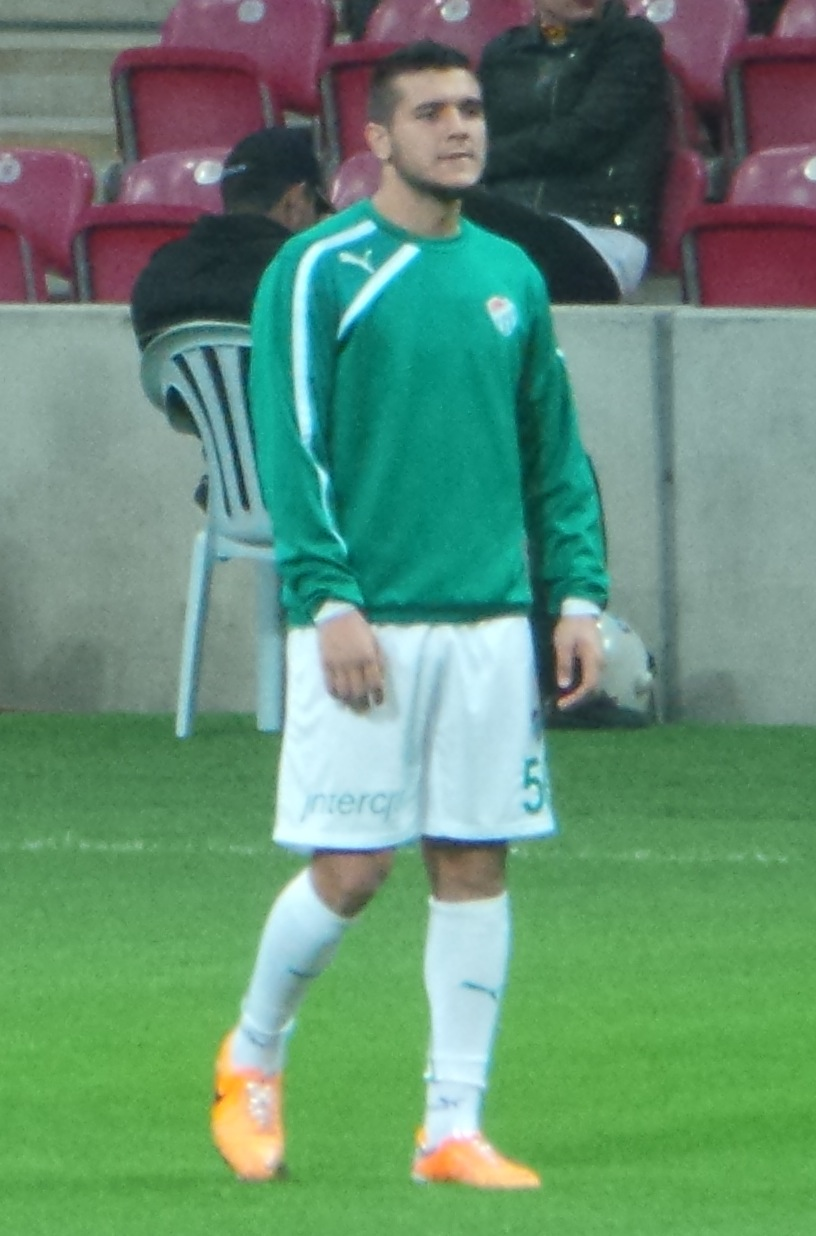
- Pülgir warming up for Bursaspor in 2014

Personal information
- Full name: Ethem Ercan Pülgir
- Date of birth: 2 April 1993 (age 33)
- Place of birth: Samsun, Turkey
- Height: 1.86 m (6 ft 1 in)
- Position: Centre back

Team information
- Current team: Osmaniyespor FK
- Number: 55

Youth career
- 2004–2005: Kaynarcaspor
- 2005–2011: Kartalspor

Senior career*
Years	Team	Apps	(Gls)
2011–2014	Kartalspor	59	(3)
2014–2015	Bursaspor	4	(0)
2015–2016	Kayseri Erciyesspor	31	(0)
2016–2017	Adanaspor	0	(0)
2017–2019	Kahramanmaraşspor	46	(1)
2019	Bayburt Özel İdarespor	13	(1)
2020	Nevşehir Belediyespor	11	(0)
2020–2021	Diyarbakırspor	25	(0)
2021–2022	İskenderunspor	26	(1)
2022	İnegölspor	7	(2)
2023	Amasyaspor FK	15	(1)
2023–	Osmaniyespor FK	9	(1)

International career
2011–2012	Turkey U20	8	(1)
2012–2013	Turkey U21	3	(0)
- * Club domestic league appearances and goals as of 1 October 2023

Ethem Ercan Pülgir (born 2 April 1993) is a Turkish professional footballer who plays as a defender for TFF Third League club Osmaniyespor FK. He made his Süper Lig debut on 4 May 2014.

== Club career ==
Pülgir started his youth career with Kartalspor and made his professional debut for them on 9 November 2011, coming in as a substitute in a 1–0 victory against Elaziğspor. He was listed as one of the top youth talents of 1.Lig during the 2011 season.

On 7 January 2014, Pülgir joined Bursaspor. He quickly fell out of favor despite a few good performances, and by October 2014 he was not featuring in the match-day squads. On 25 January 2015, he joined Süper Lig rival Kayseri Erciyesspor, signing a 2.5 years contract. Unfortunately, at the end of the 2014–15 season, his club was relegated.

In the summer of 2016, Pülgir joined Adanaspor. In December of the same year he was left out of the squad, after a fall out with the coach. In September 2017, he joined Kahramanmaraşspor as a free agent.

On 11 July 2019 Pülgir joined 2.Lig club Bayburt ÖİS. On 19 December 2019, he joined 3.Lig club Nevșehir Belediyespor.

On 23 August 2020, Ethem joined fellow 3.Lig club Diyarbakırspor. On 18 June 2021, he joined another 3.Lig club in İskenderunspor, signing a one-year contract.

On 25 June 2022, Pülgir joined 2.Lig club İnegölspor, signing a two-year contract. Midseason, on 6 December 2022, he joined 3.Lig club Amasyaspor.

On 28 July 2023, Ethem joined 3.Lig club Osmaniyespor.

== International career ==
Pülgir was first called up to the Turkey U-20 team in 2012, for two friendlies against Italy and Netherlands. He represented Turkey at the 2013 FIFA U-20 World Cup.

== Career statistics ==
=== Club ===
As of 4 December 2023

Appearances and goals by club, season and competition
Club	Season	League			National Cup		Total	
Club	Season	Division	Apps	Goals	Apps	Goals	Apps	Goals
Kartalspor	2011–12	TFF First League	18	2	0	0	18	2
Kartalspor	2012–13	TFF First League	28	0	1	0	29	0
Kartalspor	2013–14	TFF Second League	13	1	0	0	13	1
Kartalspor	Total		59	3	1	0	60	3
Bursaspor	2013–14	Süper Lig	3	0	0	0	3	0
Bursaspor	2014–15	Süper Lig	1	0	2	0	1	2
Bursaspor	Total		4	0	2	0	6	0
Kayseri Eciyesspor	2014–15	Süper Lig	6	0	0	0	6	0
Kayseri Eciyesspor	2015–16	TFF First League	25	0	0	0	25	0
Kayseri Eciyesspor	Total		31	0	0	0	31	0
Adanaspor	2016–17	Süper Lig	0	0	1	0	1	0
Kahramanmaraşspor	2017–18	TFF Second League	25	1	2	0	27	1
Kahramanmaraşspor	2018–19	TFF Second League	21	0	2	0	23	0
Kahramanmaraşspor	Total		46	1	4	0	60	1
Bayburt Özel İdarespor	2019–20	TFF Second League	13	1	2	0	15	1
Nevşehir Balediyespor	2019–20	TFF Third League	11	0	0	0	11	0
Diyarbakırspor	2020–21	TFF Third League	25	0	0	0	25	0
İskenderunspor	2021–22	TFF Third League	26	1	0	0	26	1
İnegölspor	2022–23	TFF Second League	7	2	0	0	7	2
Amasyaspor	2022–23	TFF Third League	15	1	0	0	15	1
Osmaniyespor	2023–24	TFF Third League	9	1	1	0	10	1
Career total			246	10	11	0	257	10
