= 2012–13 TFF 1. Lig =

50th season of second-tier football league in Turkey

1. Lig
- Season: 2012–13
- Champions: Kayseri Erciyesspor
- Promoted: Kayseri Erciyesspor; Çaykur Rizespor; Konyaspor
- Relegated: Ankaragücü; Kartalspor; Göztepe
- Matches played: 279
- Goals scored: 655 (2.35 per match)
- Top goalscorer: Gerard Gohou (19 goals)
- Biggest home win: Erc 5–1 ADS; Riz 5–1 Göz
- Biggest away win: Ank 1–5 Buc
- Highest scoring: ADS 5–5 Buc

The 2012–13 TFF 1. Lig (referred to as the PTT 1. Lig for sponsorship reasons) is the 12th season since the league was established in 2001 and 50th season of the second-level football league of Turkey since its establishment in 1963–64. The start date of the league was 25 August 2012 and end date is 12 May 2013.

== Teams ==
Manisaspor, Ankaragücü and Samsunspor relegated from Süper Lig. Akhisar Belediyespor, Elazığspor and Kasımpaşa promoted to 2012–13 Süper Lig.

1461 Trabzon, Şanlıurfaspor and Adana Demirspor promoted from TFF Second League. İstanbul Güngörenspor, Sakaryaspor and Giresunspor relegated to 2012–13 TFF Second League.

== Foreign players ==
Club	Player 1	Player 2	Player 3	Player 4	Player 5	Former Players
1461 Trabzon	(Ghana) Torric Jebrin	(Nigeria) Chikeluba Ofoedu				
Adana Demirspor	(Brazil) Juninho	(Brazil) Luiz Eduardo	(Cameroon) Guy Toindouba	(Ghana) Karim Alhassan		(Azerbaijan) Javid Huseynov (Nigeria) Raheem Lawal
Adanaspor	(Cameroon) Marc Mbamba	(Cameroon) Mbilla Etame	(Nigeria) Chibuzor Nwogbo			
Ankaragücü						
Boluspor	(France) Wilfried Dalmat	(Ivory Coast) Serge Djiéhoua	(Liberia) Jimmy Dixon			(Nigeria) Wilfried Dalmat (Nigeria) Kingsley Nwankwo
Bucaspor	(Algeria) Mohamed Dahmane	(Brazil) Luiz Henrique	(Canada) Tam Nsaliwa			
Çaykur Rizespor	(Egypt) Hossam Hassan	(Kazakhstan) David Loriya	(Kazakhstan) Samat Smakov	(Romania) Florin Cernat	(Slovakia) David Depetris	(The Gambia) Ousman Jallow (Nigeria) Uche Kalu
Denizlispor	(Azerbaijan) Arif İsayev	(Azerbaijan) Rail Malikov	(Cameroon) Ariel Ngueukam	(Nigeria) Kingsley Nwankwo	(North Macedonia) Bajram Fetai	(Guinea) Mohamed Sakho (Kenya) Eric Odhiambo
Gaziantep B.B.						
Göztepe A.Ş.	(Brazil) Janderson Baiano	(Cameroon) Hervé Tum	(Liberia) Theo Lewis Weeks	(Portugal) Paulinho		(France) Bédi Buval
Karşıyaka	(Ghana) Emmanuel Banahene					(France) Wilfried Dalmat (Portugal) Makukula
Kartalspor	(Brazil) Deyvison	(Nigeria) Eze Vincent Okeuhie	(Tunisia) Ali Zitouni	(Turkmenistan) Zafar Babajanow		
Kayseri Erciyesspor	(Algeria) Sofiane Hanni	(Ivory Coast) Gerard Gohou	(Senegal) Insa Sylla			
Konyaspor	(Netherlands) Sjoerd Ars	(Portugal) Neca				(Bulgaria) Emil Angelov
Manisaspor	(Austria) Benjamin Fuchs	(Poland) Maciej Iwański				
Samsunspor	(Bulgaria) Nikolay Dimitrov	(Burkina Faso) Mahamoudou Kéré	(Democratic Republic of the Congo) Mazowa N'Sumbu	(Trinidad and Tobago) Darryl Roberts		
Şanlıurfaspor	(Liberia) Tonia Tisdell	(Sierra Leone) Alfred Sankoh	(Sierra Leone) Teteh Bangura			
TKİ Tavşanlı Linyitspor	(Finland) Drilon Shala	(Nigeria) Akeem Agbetu				

== League table ==
Pos	Team	Pld	W	D	L	GF	GA	GD	Pts	Qualification or relegation
1	Kayseri Erciyesspor (C, P)	34	19	6	9	59	37	+22	63	Promotion to Süper Lig
2	Çaykur Rizespor (P)	34	17	8	9	53	35	+18	59	Promotion to Süper Lig
3	1461 Trabzon (Note: Since 1461 Trabzon is Süper Lig side Trabzonspor's reserve team, their play-off spot went to 7th-placed team Adana Demirspor.)	34	15	8	11	47	31	+16	53 (Note: TRA 0–0 MAN; MAN 1–1 TRA)	
4	Manisaspor	34	14	11	9	41	28	+13	53	Qualification for Promotion Playoffs
5	Bucaspor	34	14	10	10	48	33	+15	52 (Note: BUC 0–1 KON; KON 0–2 BUC)	Qualification for Promotion Playoffs
6	Konyaspor (O, P)	34	14	10	10	38	35	+3	52	Qualification for Promotion Playoffs
7	Adana Demirspor	34	14	9	11	54	53	+1	51	Qualification for Promotion Playoffs
8	Adanaspor	34	13	10	11	42	42	0	49	
9	Karşıyaka	34	12	11	11	37	39	−2	47	
10	Boluspor	34	13	7	14	41	45	−4	46	
11	Denizlispor	34	11	10	13	35	37	−2	43 (Note: DEN 1–1 ŞUR; ŞUR 1–1 DEN)	
12	Şanlıurfaspor	34	10	13	11	32	38	−6	43	
13	Gaziantep B.B.	34	11	8	15	37	43	−6	41	
14	Samsunspor	34	7	18	9	38	39	−1	39	
15	TKİ Tavşanlı Linyitspor	34	9	11	14	34	47	−13	38	
16	Göztepe A.Ş. (R)	34	10	7	17	28	40	−12	37 (Note: GÖZ 2–0 KRT; KRT 2–1 GÖZ)	Relegation to TFF Second League
17	Kartalspor (R)	34	10	7	17	33	44	−11	37	Relegation to TFF Second League
18	MKE Ankaragücü (R)	34	7	8	19	31	62	−31	29	Relegation to TFF Second League

Source: TFF 1. Lig page
Rules for classification: 1) points; 2) goal difference; 3) number of goals scored.
(C) Champions; (O) Play-off winners; (P) Promoted; (R) Relegated

== Positions by round ==
Team ╲ Round	1	2	3	4	5	6	7	8	9	10	11	12	13	14	15	16	17	18	19	20	21	22	23	24	25	26	27	28	29	30	31	32	33	34
Kayseri Erciyesspor	5	2	3	4	2	2	1	1	2	2	1	1	1	1	1	1	2	2	3	1	1	1	1	1	1	1	1	1	1	1	1	2	1	1
Çaykur Rizespor	3	3	1	3	3	1	2	2	1	1	2	2	5	5	6	5	5	4	4	4	3	4	3	3	3	3	2	2	2	2	2	1	2	2
1461 Trabzon	2	1	2	1	4	4	3	3	3	4	4	4	2	3	2	4	4	3	2	3	4	3	4	4	4	4	3	3	4	4	4	3	4	3
Manisaspor	7	5	8	8	8	8	5	10	6	5	5	5	3	2	4	3	1	1	1	2	2	2	2	2	2	2	4	4	3	3	3	4	5	4
Bucaspor	1	8	10	12	13	14	11	7	5	8	8	6	6	8	8	9	7	8	9	8	9	9	7	8	6	6	5	5	5	5	5	5	3	5
Konyaspor	18	18	16	15	10	9	10	5	10	13	12	13	14	13	13	13	11	9	10	12	12	12	10	10	11	12	10	10	8	6	6	6	7	6
Adana Demirspor	10	12	13	17	17	15	13	9	7	6	7	9	8	7	7	6	6	6	6	5	5	5	5	7	9	9	8	7	7	7	9	8	6	7
Adanaspor	11	7	9	9	6	7	8	11	8	10	6	8	7	6	3	2	3	5	5	7	7	6	6	5	5	5	6	6	6	8	7	9	8	8
Karşıyaka	6	4	4	2	1	3	4	4	4	3	3	3	4	4	5	7	8	10	7	9	8	8	9	6	8	8	9	9	9	9	8	7	9	9
Boluspor	12	13	6	5	11	13	9	13	9	12	13	14	10	10	9	8	10	7	8	6	6	7	8	9	8	7	7	8	10	10	11	12	11	10
Denizlispor	14	9	5	6	5	6	7	8	13	14	14	11	11	11	11	11	13	13	12	13	13	14	13	13	12	11	12	13	14	14	13	13	13	11
Şanlıurfaspor	13	14	12	10	7	5	6	6	11	7	10	10	12	12	12	12	12	12	13	11	11	10	12	12	13	13	13	14	12	12	12	11	10	12
Gaziantep B.B.	15	15	15	14	15	12	15	14	12	9	9	7	9	9	10	10	9	11	11	10	10	11	11	11	10	10	11	11	11	11	10	10	12	13
Samsunspor	8	6	7	7	12	10	12	12	15	15	15	15	15	14	16	17	17	17	15	14	14	13	14	14	14	14	14	12	13	13	14	15	14	14
TKİ Tavşanlı Linyitspor	9	11	14	11	14	16	16	16	16	16	16	16	16	16	14	15	16	16	17	17	15	16	16	16	16	15	16	16	16	16	16	17	16	15
Göztepe A.Ş.	16	16	18	16	16	18	17	17	17	17	17	17	17	17	15	16	15	14	14	15	16	17	17	17	17	16	15	15	15	15	15	14	15	16
Kartalspor	4	10	11	13	8	11	14	15	14	11	11	12	13	15	17	14	14	15	16	16	17	15	15	15	15	17	17	17	17	17	17	16	17	17
MKE Ankaragücü	17	17	17	18	18	17	18	18	18	18	18	18	18	18	18	18	18	18	18	18	18	18	18	18	18	18	18	18	18	18	18	18	18	18

Source: TFF First League page

== Results ==
Home \ Away	1TR	ADS	ADA	AGÜ	BOL	BUC	ÇYR	DEN	GBB	GÖZ	KSK	KRT	KER	KON	MAN	SAM	ŞAN	TAV
1461 Trabzon		0–1		1–0	1–2	3–1	0–0	3–0	1–1	1–1	3–2	0–1	0–1	3–0	0–0	2–1	1–0	1–0
Adana Demirspor			4–2	4–1	0–1	5–5	2–2	2–1	1–1	1–0	0–2	2–1	1–3	1–2	2–0	0–0	1–1	3–2
Adanaspor		1–1		0–1	0–1	0–0	2–0	2–1	3–0	2–1	3–2	2–1	3–2	2–1	1–2	3–2	0–0	2–2
MKE Ankaragücü		1–4	0–1		1–0	1–5	2–1	0–3	1–4	3–1	1–1	1–0	1–3	0–3	1–1	1–1	0–1	0–1
Boluspor		0–0	2–2	1–1		2–5	1–3	1–1	2–0	3–0	0–1	0–1	2–4	1–3	1–2	2–1	0–1	2–2
Bucaspor		1–0	4–0	0–0	0–1		1–0	1–0	3–1	3–0	1–2	1–0	0–1	0–1	1–1	0–0	1–2	4–2
Çaykur Rizespor		1–2	1–0	3–0	1–0	1–0		0–0	2–1	5–1	2–2	3–0	2–2	2–0	1–1	1–0	1–1	4–0
Denizlispor		2–0	1–0	2–1	0–1	2–0	1–0		2–1	1–0	1–2	1–1	1–2	1–1	1–1	2–1	1–1	0–1
Gaziantep B.B.		1–2	1–1	1–1	2–1	2–1	1–4	0–1		0–2	3–0	1–0	3–2	1–0	0–1	1–2	1–1	3–2
Göztepe A.Ş.		0–2	0–0	1–1	1–2	1–1	1–0	1–1	2–0		3–2	2–0	0–0	0–0	0–1	0–1	4–0	0–1
Karşıyaka		1–4	0–2	2–0	1–0	1–0	0–1	0–0	0–0	2–0		2–2	2–4	1–1	1–1	0–1	1–0	0–0
Kartalspor		3–1	3–0	1–1	2–0	0–1	0–1	1–0	1–0	2–1	4–3		1–3	0–0	0–0	2–2	1–1	2–1
Kayseri Erciyesspor		5–1	1–2	2–1	2–3	0–0	0–1	2–0	1–1	2–0	0–1	1–0		0–2	2–3	2–1	3–1	2–0
Konyaspor		3–3	1–0	1–0	0–1	0–2	1–3	2–0	0–0	2–0	0–0	4–1	0–2		2–1	2–2	0–0	2–0
Manisaspor		3–0	2–1	4–0	2–0	1–1	2–0	0–1	2–1	0–1	1–0	1–0	1–2	1–2		0–0	0–0	4–0
Samsunspor		1–1	1–1	2–4	2–2	0–0	4–0	2–2	0–3	1–0	0–0	3–1	1–1	1–1	2–1		1–1	1–1
Şanlıurfaspor		2–3	0–0	3–2	1–3	1–2	2–2	1–1	0–1	0–2	0–1	1–0	1–0	2–0	2–0	2–1		0–0
TKİ Tavşanlı Linyitspor		1–0	0–0	2–0	2–2	0–0	2–3	4–3	1–0	0–1	1–1	2–0	1–2	0–1	1–0	0–0	1–3	

Source: TFF 1. Lig page
Legend: Blue = home team win; Yellow = draw; Red = away team win.

== Promotion playoffs ==
The teams ranked fourth through seventh will contest in the promotion playoffs for the 2013–14 Süper Lig. The 4th team and 7th teams will play two matches in their own grounds. Likewise the 5th and 6th teams will play a two match elimination round. This round is named as semi-finals. Winning teams will play one final match at a neutral venue. The winner of the final will be the third team to promote to Süper Lig 2013–2014. 3rd-placed team 1461 Trabzon is Süper Lig side Trabzonspor's reserve team So They Were Ineligible For Promotion And their play-off spot went to 7th-placed team Adana Demirspor.

=== Semi-finals 4-7 ===
19 May 2013
Sunday, 19:00

Adana Demirspor	0–2	Manisaspor
	Report	Sultan 14'; Kahé 60'

5 Ocak, Adana
Referee: Abdullah Yılmaz

23 May 2013
Thursday, 19:00

Manisaspor	1–1	Adana Demirspor
Fuchs 20'	Report	Toindouba 89'

19 Mayıs, Manisa
Referee: Hüseyin Göçek

=== Semi-finals 5–6 ===
19 May 2013
Sunday, 21:15

Konyaspor	0–1	Bucaspor
	Report	Luiz Henrique 44'

Atatürk, Konya
Referee: Serkan Çınar

23 May 2013
Thursday, 21:15

Bucaspor	1–2 (a)	Konyaspor
Luiz Henrique 61'	Report	Akın 63'; Ay 78'

Buca Arena, İzmir
Referee: Halis Özkahya

=== Final ===
26 May 2013
Sunday, 19:30

Manisaspor	0–2	Konyaspor
	Report	Recep Aydın 7'; Sjoerd Ars 47'

Eskişehir Atatürk Stadium
Referee: Bülent Yıldırım

== Season statistics ==
As of 12 May 2013

=== Top goalscorers ===
Rank	Player	Club	Goals
1	(Ivory Coast) Gerard Gohou	Erciyesspor	19
2	(Brazil) Kahê	Manisaspor	17
3	(Brazil) Juninho	Adana Demirspor	14
3	(Ghana) Emmanuel Banahene	Karşıyaka	14
5	(Turkey) Emrah Bozkurt	Erciyesspor	13
5	(Turkey) Erdal Kılıçaslan	Konyaspor	13
7	(Cameroon) Mbilla Etame	Adanaspor	12
7	(Turkey) Serdar Deliktaş	Gaziantep B.B.	12
7	(Turkey) Mehmet Batdal	Bucaspor	12
10	(Turkey) Sercan Kaya	Çaykur Rizespor / 1461 Trabzon	11
11	(Turkey) Cenk Ahmet Alkılıç	Çaykur Rizespor	10
11	(Turkey) Timur Özgöz	Ankaragücü	10
11	(Turkey) Mehmet Uslu	Kartalspor	10

=== Top assists ===
Rank	Player	Club	Assists
1	(Turkey) Sercan Kaya	1461 Trabzon / Çaykur Rizespor	9
2	(Turkey) Erçağ Evirgen	Adana Demirspor	8
3	(Algeria) Sofiane Hanni	Erciyesspor	7
4	(Turkey) Erman Özgür	Adana Demirspor	6
4	(Turkey) Cafercan Aksu	Boluspor	6
4	(Turkey) Fatih Şen	Samsunspor	6
7	(Turkey) İzzet Kaya	Şanlıurfaspor	5
7	(Turkey) Erkan Taşkıran	Bucaspor	5
7	(Turkey) Umut Gündoğan	Bucaspor	5
7	(Turkey) Eren Albayrak	Çaykur Rizespor	5
7	(Turkey) İsmail Haktan Odabaşı	Denizlispor	5
7	(Turkey) Kenan Şahin	Erciyesspor	5
7	(Turkey) Ramazan Altıntepe	Gaziantep B.B.	5
7	(Turkey) Kaan Kanak	Ankaragücü	5

=== Yellow cards ===
Rank	Player	Club	Yellow Cards
1	(Cameroon) Marc Kibong Mbamba	Adanaspor	15
2	(Turkey) Adnan Güngör	Karşıyaka	14
3	(Turkey) İlhan Şahin	Göztepe / Kartalspor	13
3	(Turkey) Barbaros Barut	Boluspor	13
5	(Turkey) Sedat Ağçay	Adanaspor	12
5	(Turkey) Ali Sakal	Gaziantep B.B.	12
5	(Turkey) Bekir Yılmaz	Manisaspor	12
5	(Sierra Leone) Alfred Sankoh	Şanlıurfaspor	12
9	(Turkey) Sabutay Alper Bayülken	Kartalspor	11
9	(Turkey) Ethem Ercan Pülgir	Kartalspor	11
9	(Turkey) Bilal Aziz Özer	Konyaspor / Erciyesspor	11

=== Red cards ===
Rank	Player	Club	Red Cards
1	(Turkey) Veli Kızılkaya	Göztepe	3
2	(Turkey) Timur Bayram Özgöz	Ankaragücü	2
2	(Turkey) Burak Keskin	Adana Demirspor	2
2	(Turkey) Serdar Deliktaş	Gaziantep B.B.	2
2	(Turkey) Kağan Timurcin Konuk	Şanlıurfaspor	2
2	(Turkey) Sakıb Aytaç	Tavşanlı Linyitspor	2
2	(Turkey) Volkan Koçaloğlu	Tavşanlı Linyitspor	2
2	(Turkey) Mustafa Akbaş	1461 Trabzon	2

== See also ==
- 2012–13 Turkish Cup
- 2012–13 Süper Lig
- 2012–13 TFF Second League
- 2012–13 TFF Third League
