= Bilal Aziz Özer =

Turkish football player and coach (born 1985)

Personal information
- Date of birth: 1 July 1985 (age 41)
- Place of birth: Beirut, Lebanon
- Height: 1.74 m (5 ft 9 in)
- Position: Left-back

Team information
- Current team: Eintracht Hohkeppel (assistant coach)

Youth career
- –2000: TSV Verden
- 2000–2004: Schalke 04

Senior career*
Years	Team	Apps	(Gls)
2003–2006	Schalke 04 II	59	(22)
2007	VfL Osnabrück II	4	(0)
2007–2008	VfL Osnabrück	48	(2)
2008–2010	Kayserispor	37	(0)
2012	Konya Şekerspor	14	(0)
2012–2013	Konyaspor	13	(0)
2013	Kayseri Erciyesspor	15	(2)
2013–2016	Osmanlıspor (Note: Ankaraspor changed its name to Osmanlıspor in 2014.)	55	(9)
2016–2018	Eskişehirspor	34	(0)
2018–2019	Fatih Karagümrük	28	(0)
2019	Başkent Akademi	13	(1)
2020	Bayrampaşaspor	9	(0)
2020	Antalya Kemerspor	10	(0)
Total		339	(36)

Managerial career
- 2025–: Eintracht Hohkeppel (assistant)
- * Club domestic league appearances and goals

Bilal Aziz Özer (born 1 July 1985) is a Turkish professional football coach and former player who is the assistant coach of German club Eintracht Hohkeppel.

A left-back, Özer started his career in Germany before moving to Turkey in 2008, playing for several Süper Lig, TFF 1. Lig, and TFF 2. Lig clubs until his retirement in 2020.

== Early life ==
Born in Beirut, Lebanon, Özer is of Turkish descent. His family originates from Adana, Turkey, and he grew up in Verden, Germany. During his early career in Germany, he was registered as a Turkish citizen.

== Playing career ==
Özer began his career with TSV Verden before joining the youth academy of Schalke 04, with whom he won the German under-17 championship. He later played for Schalke 04 II before moving to VfL Osnabrück, where he made 48 appearances and scored two goals. He contributed to the club's promotion to the 2. Bundesliga.

In 2008, Özer joined Turkish Süper Lig club Kayserispor. In January 2010, he was suspended by the club following allegations of involvement in match fixing during an investigation, although he denied any wrongdoing. He was subsequently suspended from football activities for 18 months.

After leaving Kayserispor, Özer joined Konya Şekerspor in January 2012, and moved to Konyaspor in July 2012. He then transferred to Kayseri Erciyesspor in December 2012 on a 1.5-year contract, before joining Ankaraspor ahead of the 2013–14 season, which changed its name to Osmanlispor in 2014.

In July 2016, Özer signed for Eskişehirspor, where he played 19 games in the 2017–18 TFF 1. Lig season. He joined Fatih Karagümrük in July 2018, making 36 appearances in all competitions during the 2018–19 season. He later played for Başkent Akademi in 2019, Bayrampaşaspor in 2020, and Antalya Kemerspor in 2020.

Özer finished his playing career with 42 appearances in the Turkish top flight and 112 appearances in the second tier.

== Managerial career ==
In July 2025, Özer was appointed assistant coach of German Mittelrheinliga club Eintracht Hohkeppel.

== Career statistics ==
Appearances and goals by club, season and competition
Club	Season	League			National cup (Note: Includes DFB-Pokal, Turkish Cup)		Continental		Other		Total	
Club	Season	Division	Apps	Goals	Apps	Goals	Apps	Goals	Apps	Goals	Apps	Goals
Schalke 04 II	2002–03	Oberliga Westfalen	1	0	—		—		—		1	0
Schalke 04 II	2003–04	Oberliga Westfalen	0	0	—		—		—		0	0
Schalke 04 II	2004–05	Oberliga Westfalen	26	6	—		—		0	0	26	6
Schalke 04 II	2005–06	Oberliga Westfalen	32	16	—		—		—		32	16
Schalke 04 II	Total		59	22	0	0	0	0	0	0	59	22
VfL Osnabrück II	2006–07	Oberliga Nord	1	0	—		—		—		1	0
VfL Osnabrück II	2007–08	Oberliga Nord	3	0	—		—		—		3	0
VfL Osnabrück II	Total		4	0	0	0	0	0	0	0	4	0
VfL Osnabrück	2006–07	Regionalliga Nord	26	2	3	1	—		1 (Note: Appearance in Lower Saxony Cup)	0	30	3
VfL Osnabrück	2007–08	2. Bundesliga	22	0	1	0	—		—		23	0
VfL Osnabrück	Total		48	2	4	1	0	0	1	0	53	3
Kayserispor	2008–09	Süper Lig	26	0	5	0	1 (Note: Appearance in UEFA Cup)	0	0	0	32	0
Kayserispor	2009–10	Süper Lig	11	0	1	0	—		—		12	0
Kayserispor	Total		37	0	6	0	1	0	0	0	44	0
Konya Şekerspor	2011–12	TFF 2. Lig	14	0	1	0	—		—		15	0
Konyaspor	2012–13	TFF 1. Lig	13	0	1	1	—		—		14	1
Kayseri Erciyesspor	2012–13	TFF 1. Lig	15	2	—		—		—		15	2
Ankaraspor	2013–14	TFF 1. Lig	30	6	0	0	—		2 (Note: Appearance(s) in TFF 1. Lig promotion play-offs)	0	32	6
Osmanlispor	2014–15	TFF 1. Lig	20	3	1	0	—		—		21	3
Osmanlispor	2015–16	Süper Lig	5	0	1	0	—		—		6	0
Osmanlispor	Total		55	9	2	0	0	0	2	0	59	9
Eskişehirspor	2016–17	TFF 1. Lig	16	0	1	0	—		1	0	18	0
Eskişehirspor	2017–18	TFF 1. Lig	18	0	1	0	—		—		19	0
Eskişehirspor	Total		34	0	2	0	0	0	1	0	37	0
Fatih Karagümrük	2018–19	TFF 2. Lig	28	0	3	0	—		5 (Note: Appearances in TFF 2. Lig promotion play-offs)	0	36	0
Başkent Akademi	2019–20	TFF 2. Lig	13	1	0	0	—		—		13	1
Bayrampaşaspor	2019–20	TFF 3. Lig	9	0	—		—		—		9	0
Antalya Kemerspor	2020–21	TFF 3. Lig	10	0	1	0	—		—		11	0
Career total			339	36	20	2	1	0	9	0	369	38

== Honours ==
Kayseri Erciyesspor

- TFF 1. Lig: 2012–13
