= Sait Karafırtınalar =

Turkish footballer (born 1969)

Personal information
- Date of birth: 1 January 1969 (age 57)
- Place of birth: İzmir, Turkey

Senior career*
Years	Team	Apps	(Gls)
1989–1994	Bucaspor		
1994–1995	Turgutluspor		
1995	Soma Linyitspor		
1995–1997	Balıkesirspor		
1997–1998	Gaziemirspor		
1998–1999	Bergama Belediyespor		
1999–2001	Anadolu Üsküdar		

Managerial career
- 2003–2005: Bucaspor (youth)
- 2005–2006: Denizli BS (assistant)
- 2006: Muğlaspor (assistant)
- 2007–2008: Bucaspor (assistant)
- 2009–2010: Bucaspor (assistant)
- 2010: Göztepe (assistant)
- 2010–2011: Bucaspor
- 2011–2013: Bucaspor
- 2013: Karşıyaka
- 2014–2015: Bucaspor
- 2016: Kayseri Erciyesspor
- 2016–2017: Manisaspor
- 2017–2019: Boluspor
- 2019: Altay
- 2020: Ümraniyespor
- 2021–2022: Adanaspor
- 2022–2023: Boluspor
- 2023: Bucaspor 1928
- 2024–2025: Şanlıurfaspor
- * Club domestic league appearances and goals

Sait Karafırtınalar (born 1 January 1969) is a Turkish football coach and former player who most recently coached Şanlıurfaspor.
