= Yakup Ramazan Zorlu =

French footballer (born 1991)

Personal information
- Date of birth: 26 March 1991 (age 35)
- Place of birth: Orléans, France
- Height: 1.87 m (6 ft 2 in)
- Position: Striker

Team information
- Current team: Düzcespor
- Number: 9

Youth career
- –2009: Kartalspor

Senior career*
Years	Team	Apps	(Gls)
2009–2011	Kartalspor	6	(1)
2011–2012	Darıca Gençlerbirliği		
2012	VfB Lübeck	5	(0)
2013–2014	Giresunspor	12	(2)
2014–2015	Kayseri Erciyesspor	1	(0)
2015	→ Gölbaşıspor (loan)	10	(2)
2016	İstanbulspor	19	(6)
2016–2018	Kahramanmaraşspor	47	(16)
2018–2019	Fethiyespor	28	(7)
2019–2020	Pendikspor	16	(3)
2020–2022	Kahramanmaraşspor	43	(8)
2022–2023	Hacettepe 1945 SK	10	(1)
2023	Amasyaspor FK	14	(4)
2023–	Düzcespor	5	(0)
- * Club domestic league appearances and goals as of 23 September 2023

Yakup Ramazan Zorlu (born 26 March 1991) is a French professional footballer who plays for TFF Second League club Düzcespor.
