= Mahmut Boz =

Turkish football player

Personal information
- Full name: Enes Mahmut Boz
- Date of birth: 16 April 1991 (age 35)
- Place of birth: Eskişehir, Turkey
- Height: 1.81 m (5 ft 11 1/2 in)
- Position: Defender

Team information
- Current team: Anadolu Üniversitesi

Youth career
- 2004–2006: Sağlıkspor
- 2006–2009: Gençlerbirliği

Senior career*
Years	Team	Apps	(Gls)
2009–2013	Gençlerbirliği	26	(0)
2011	→ Sivasspor (loan)	4	(0)
2012	→ Karşıyaka (loan)	16	(0)
2012–2013	→ Boluspor (loan)	9	(0)
2013–2014	Eskişehirspor	0	(0)
2014	→ Gaziantep BB (loan)	14	(0)
2015	Bayrampaşaspor	6	(0)
2015–2016	Orduspor	13	(1)
2016	Osmanlıspor	0	(0)
2016	→ Bugsaşspor (loan)	7	(0)
2016–2018	Bugsaşspor	88	(0)
2018–2019	Gençlerbirliği	1	(0)
2020	Amed S.K.	6	(1)
2020–2021	Afjet Afyonspor	17	(1)
2021–2022	Turgutluspor	10	(0)
2022	Ergene Velimeşe	12	(0)
2022–2023	Bayburt Özel İdarespor	11	(0)
2023	Batman Petrolspor	10	(0)
2023–	Anadolu Üniversitesi	0	(0)

International career
2007	Turkey U17	7	(0)
- * Club domestic league appearances and goals as of 20 May 2023

Mahmut Boz (born 16 April 1991) is a Turkish footballer who plays as a defender for TFF Third League club Anadolu Üniversitesi.
