= Mustafa Kayabaşı =

Turkish footballer

Personal information
- Date of birth: 15 March 1988 (age 38)
- Place of birth: Erbaa, Turkey
- Height: 1.74 m (5 ft 9 in)
- Positions: Attacking midfielder; right winger

Team information
- Current team: Karabük İdman Yurdu
- Number: 8

Youth career
- 2000–2006: Gençlerbirliği

Senior career*
Years	Team	Apps	(Gls)
2006–2013	Gençlerbirliği	2	(0)
2007–2008	→ Fethiyespor (loan)	30	(2)
2008–2009	→ Kastamonuspor (loan)	30	(1)
2009–2011	→ Hacettepe (loan)	56	(4)
2011–2012	→ Balıkesirspor (loan)	30	(3)
2013	→ Samsunspor (loan)	16	(0)
2013–2014	Balıkesirspor	13	(1)
2014	→ Boluspor (loan)	14	(0)
2014–2015	Hatayspor	13	(0)
2015–2017	Keçiörengücü	53	(6)
2017	Erzurum BB	15	(1)
2017–2019	52 Orduspor	57	(4)
2019–2021	Ankara Demirspor	58	(6)
2021–2022	İnegölspor	18	(0)
2022	Iğdır	17	(1)
2022–2023	68 Aksaray Belediyespor	29	(5)
2023–	Karabük İdman Yurdu	3	(0)
- * Club domestic league appearances and goals as of 23 September 2023

Mustafa Kayabaşı (born 15 March 1988) is a Turkish professional footballer who plays as a midfielder for TFF Third League club Karabük İdman Yurdu.
