= Cem Can =

Turkish football player

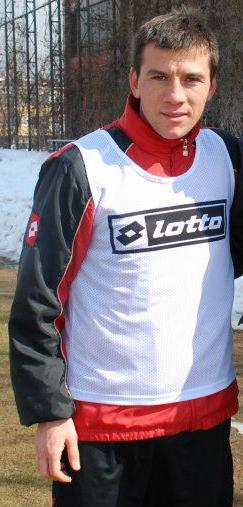

Personal information
- Date of birth: April 1, 1981 (age 45)
- Place of birth: Ankara, Turkey
- Height: 1.74 m (5 ft 9 in)
- Positions: Right back; central midfielder

Youth career
- 1996–1999: Tunç Altndağ
- 1999–2001: Başkent Edaşspor

Senior career*
| Years | Team | Apps | (Gls) |
| 2001–2002 | Bugsaşspor | 32 | (5) |
| 2002–2003 | Ankara Demirspor | 31 | (10) |
| 2003–2006 | İstanbulspor | 76 | (5) |
| 2006–2007 | Sivasspor | 46 | (1) |
| 2007–2009 | Ankaragücü | 49 | (1) |
| 2009–2013 | Gençlerbirliği | 135 | (3) |
| 2013–2014 | Kayseri Erciyesspor | 40 | (0) |
| 2014–2016 | Kayserispor | 27 | (0) |
- * Club domestic league appearances and goals

Cem Can (pronounced [ˈdʒem ˈdʒan]; born 1 April 1981 in Ankara, Turkey) is a Turkish football player who plays as a midfielder.
