= Chibuzor Nwogbo =

Nigerian footballer (born 1990)

Personal information
- Date of birth: 31 October 1990 (age 35)
- Place of birth: Jos, Nigeria
- Position: Striker

Senior career*
Years	Team	Apps	(Gls)
2008/2009	Cihangir GSK		
2011–2012	University of Pretoria F.C.		(6)
2012–2013	Adanaspor	29	(4)
2013–2015	Cihangir GSK	36	(17)
2015–2016	Nevşehir Belediyespor	18	(17)
2016–2017	Utaş Uşakspor	23	(6)
2017–2018	Nevşehir Belediyespor	26	(17)
2018–2019	1954 Kelkit Belediyespor	26	(18)
- * Club domestic league appearances and goals

Chibuzor Aloysius Nwogbo (born 31 October 1990 in Nigeria) is a Nigerian former footballer.

== Career ==
After playing for Northern Cypriot club Cihangir GSK as well as University of Pretoria in the South African second division, Nwogbo signed for Turkish fifth division side Nevşehir Belediyespor, where he scored 12 goals in his first 9 league appearances, with at least 1 every game. From there, he played for Utaş Uşakspor and 1954 Kelkit Belediyespor in the Turkish fifth division.
