= Cumhur Yılmaztürk =

Turkish footballer (born 1990)

Personal information
- Date of birth: 5 January 1990 (age 36)
- Place of birth: Istanbul, Turkey
- Height: 1.76 m (5 ft 9 in)
- Position: Defensive midfielder

Team information
- Current team: Adıyaman FK

Youth career
- 2001–2003: Terazidere
- 2003–2008: Galatasaray A2

Senior career*
Years	Team	Apps	(Gls)
2008–2011	Galatasaray A2	91	(7)
2010–2011	Galatasaray	1	(0)
2011–2014	Çaykur Rizespor	24	(0)
2013–2014	→ Kahramanmaraşspor (loan)	30	(2)
2014–2015	Altay	32	(1)
2015–2017	Gümüşhanespor	70	(3)
2017–2018	Amed	30	(1)
2018–2019	Sancaktepe Belediyespor	16	(0)
2019	Fethiyespor	15	(0)
2019–2020	İnegölspor	23	(0)
2020–2021	Sivas Belediyespor	15	(0)
2021	Nevşehir Belediyespor	10	(0)
2021–2022	Niğde Anadolu	17	(0)
2022–2023	Bayburt Özel İdarespor	36	(2)
2023–	Adıyaman FK	0	(0)
- * Club domestic league appearances and goals as of 9 September 2023

Cumhur Yılmaztürk (born 5 January 1990) is a Turkish footballer who plays as defensive midfielder for TFF Second League club Adıyaman FK.
