= Fuat Çapa =

Turkish football manager

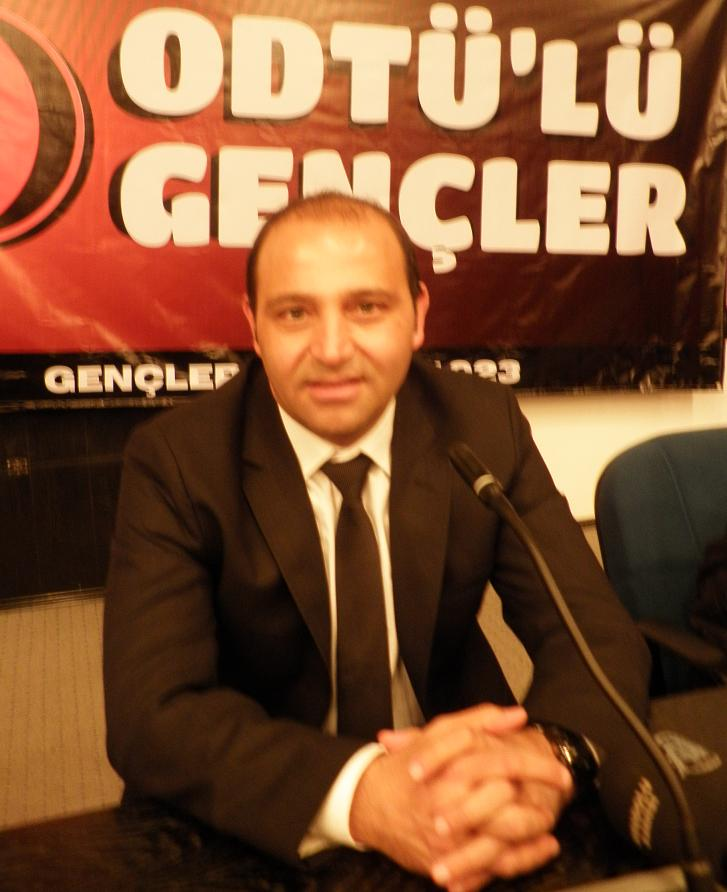
- Fuat Çapa in 2012

Personal information
- Date of birth: 15 August 1968 (age 58)
- Place of birth: Emirdağ, Turkey

Team information
- Current team: Samsunspor (director of football)

Managerial career
- Years: Team
- 2000–2004: K.V. Turnhout
- 2004–2005: Maasmechelen
- 2005–2006: B-H-Zolder
- 2006–2007: Hamme
- 2007–2008: Gençlerbirliği
- 2008–2009: MVV Maastricht
- 2010: RBC Roosendaal
- 2010–2011: Kasımpaşa
- 2011–2013: Gençlerbirliği
- 2013: Erciyesspor
- 2014: Antalyaspor
- 2015: Wil
- 2016–2017: Boluspor
- 2018–2019: Eskişehirspor
- 2020: Kasımpaşa
- 2020: Ankaragücü
- 2020–2021: Kasımpaşa
- 2021–2022: Samsunspor
- 2023–: Samsunspor (director of football)

Fuat Çapa (born 15 August 1968) is a Turkish football coach, and the director of football of Samsunspor.

== Career ==
Çapa coached in Belgium before moving on to Turkey. His career in Belgium spanned four years as he held positions with K.V. Turnhout, K. Patro Maasmechelen, K. Beringen-Heusden-Zolder, Verbroedering Geel, and most recently VW Hamme. He is the first Turkish coach to receive a UEFA Pro Licence. On 29 May 2008 he was named the new head coach of Dutch club MVV Maastricht as the successor of Robert Maaskant. He temporarily managed Gençlerbirliği in the 2007–2008 season, and returned there in 2011. At the end of the 2012–2013 season, Gençlerbirliği S.K. chose not to retain him and he became head coach of newly promoted Kayseri Erciyesspor. In the second half of the league, Çapa left Erciyesspor and joined Antalyaspor for a few months. The following year, he joined Wil, but again did not last long there, as he was succeeded by Kevin Cooper.
