= Bayburt Özel İdarespor =

Turkish football club

- Full name: Bayburt Grup Özel İdare Gençlik ve Spor
- Founded: 1989
- Ground: Genç Osman Stadium, Bayburt
- Capacity: 5,000
- Chairman: Şemsettin Çalışkan
- Manager: Bülent Topuzoğlu
Home colours	Away colours

Bayburt Özel İdarespor is a Turkish professional football club based in Bayburt. The team currently competes in the TFF Second League after being promoted following the 2018–19 season. The club was promoted to the TFF Third League after 2013–14 season.

== League participations ==
- TFF Third League: 2014–present
- Turkish Regional Amateur League: 2012–2014

== Stadium ==
Currently, the team plays at the 5,000-person capacity Genç Osman Stadium.

== Current squad ==
As of 8 September 2022

Note: Flags indicate national team as defined under FIFA eligibility rules; some limited exceptions apply. Players may hold more than one non-FIFA nationality.

No.	Pos.	Nation	Player
1	GK	TUR	Oğuzhan Yeşilyurt
2	DF	TUR	Ali Kemal Yılmaz
3	DF	TUR	Yiğit Turgut
4	DF	TUR	Burak Bozbey
5	MF	TUR	Cihan Avcu
6	MF	TUR	Ramazan Övüç
7	FW	TUR	Ali Ateş
8	MF	TUR	Selim Asal
9	FW	TUR	Furkan Özdemir
10	FW	TUR	Volkan Pala
11	MF	TUR	Talha Erdoğan (on loan from Boluspor)
14	DF	TUR	Kaan Arslan
15	DF	TUR	Fatih Balata
17	FW	TUR	Mehmet Yanıkara (on loan from Antalyaspor)
18	MF	TUR	Muhammet Fatih Karadeniz
19	DF	TUR	Efecan Gülerce (on loan from Antalyaspor)

No.	Pos.	Nation	Player
20	MF	TUR	Buğrahan Kavaklı
23	MF	TUR	Efe Lorenzo Deniz
45	MF	TUR	Batın Özdemir
48	GK	TUR	Mert Özyiğit
53	GK	TUR	Yunus Emre Kırdal
55	MF	GER	Pekin Köşnek
61	FW	TUR	Eren Şahin (on loan from Sivasspor)
66	MF	TUR	Burak Bayram
69	MF	TUR	Cumhur Yılmaztürk
70	MF	TUR	Yüksel Şişman
73	DF	TUR	Mahmut Boz
80	MF	TUR	Tuncay Kılıç
88	DF	TUR	Cevat Kuy
94	MF	TUR	Mustafa Dündar
97	MF	TUR	Okan Sarı
99	FW	TUR	Emirhan Eskici

=== Other players under contract ===
Note: Flags indicate national team as defined under FIFA eligibility rules; some limited exceptions apply. Players may hold more than one non-FIFA nationality.

No.	Pos.	Nation	Player
—	FW	TUR	İbrahim Carlak
