= Hansell Arauz =

Costa Rican footballer (born 1989)

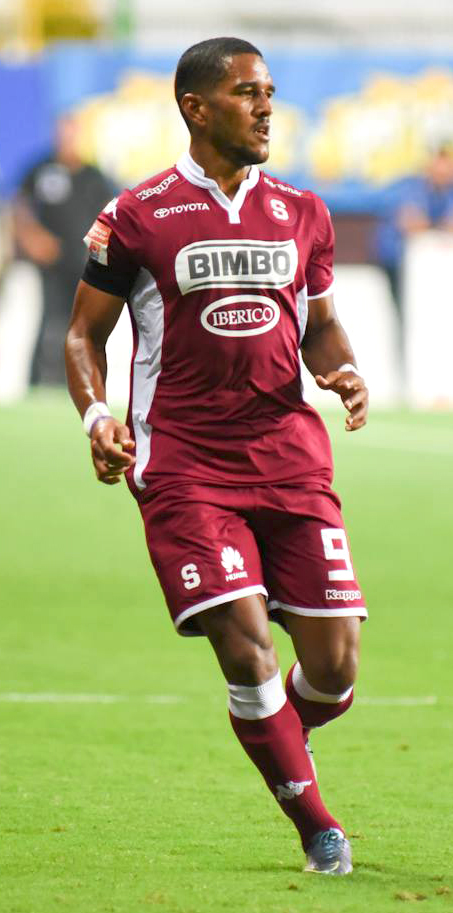

Personal information
- Full name: Hansell Arauz Ovares
- Date of birth: 9 August 1989 (age 37)
- Place of birth: Golfito, Puntarenas, Costa Rica
- Height: 1.75 m (5 ft 9 in)
- Position: Attacking midfielder

Senior career*
Years	Team	Apps	(Gls)
2010–2011	Barrio México	13	(2)
2011	Santos de Guápiles	16	(1)
2012–2013	Cartaginés	41	(4)
2013	Erciyesspor	9	(0)
2014–2017	Deportivo Saprissa	99	(7)
2017	Carmelita	3	(0)
2018	Puerto Golfito		
2019	Municipal Grecia	34	(0)

International career
2011	Costa Rica U-23	3	(0)
- * Club domestic league appearances and goals

Hansell Arauz Ovares (born 9 August 1989) is a Costa Rican football midfielder.

== Club career ==
Born in Golfito, Puntarenas, Arauz was raised in Guápiles, Limón by his mother. He began playing football in the local league and signed with C.S. Cartaginés in 2012.

=== Cartaginés ===
In January 2012, he signed a new contract with C.S. Cartaginés. On 15 January 2012, Arauz made his official debut for Cartaginés in the opening match in the Summer 2012 playing 74 minutes in the victory 1–3 over San Carlos. On 22 January 2012, Arauz played in the debut official match of Cartaginés for the Estadio Nacional de Costa Rica and substituted by José Sánchez at 56 minutes in the team's victory against tri-champion Alajuelense in the "Clasico Provincial". On 12 February 2012, he scored his debut official goal for the "Clasico Provincial" against Herediano at 45 minutes in week 7. At halftime, he picked up the ball with his chest on the edge of the box, shoot with the right leg and deviated to José Miguel Cubero for the 1–0. On 26 February 2012, Arauz scored his second goal for the club in week 10, was 0–1 against Santos de Guápiles, but the team would lose 3–2. On 18 April 2012, against Santos de Guápiles Arauz made the pass in the third goal for Pablo Brenes and in the fifth goal Arauz retrieves the ball, the Cartaginés made five passes and the play ends in a goal. The match would end 5–1. On 5 August 2012, score the third goal against the runner up Santos de Guapiles in the 6–0 victory, after a play between Erick Ponce and Pablo Brenes, the Mexican would make the center and Arauz would score a header in 59 minutes.

=== Turkey ===
In June 2013, he was hired by the Kayseri Erciyesspor, team of TFF 1. League in Turkey for two years.

=== Saprissa ===
In January 2014, Arauz was announced their new player by Deportivo Saprissa.

=== Puerto Golfito & Municipal Grecia ===
On 22 August 2018, Puerto Golfito FC confirmed the signing of Arauz. He played for the club until the end of 2018, before signing with Municipal Grecia on 11 January 2019.

== International career ==
Arauz was included but did not appear in the Costa Rica national football team for the 2011 Copa América; he did not play at all in the tournament.

== Career statistics ==
Season	Club	Division	League		Cup		Concachampions		Total	
Season	Club	Division	Apps	Goals	Apps	Goals	Apps	Goals	Apps	Goals
2011–12	Cartaginés	Primera División	20	2	-	-	-	-	20	2
2012–13	Cartaginés	Primera División	18	1	-	-	-	-	18	1
Career Total			41	4	-	-	-	-	41	4
