= Randall Azofeifa =

Costa Rican footballer (born 1984)

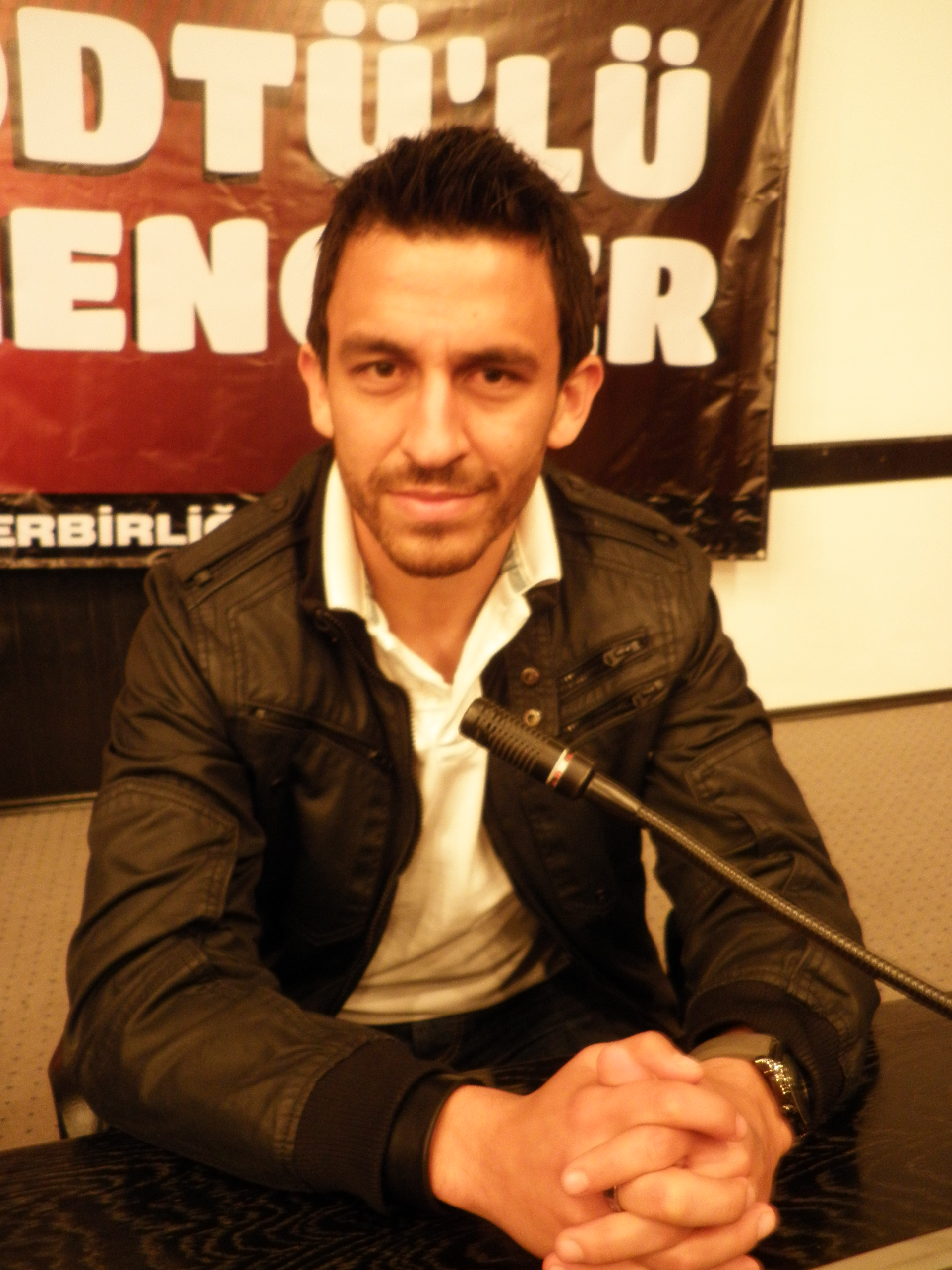
- Azofeifa in 2012

Personal information
- Full name: Randall Azofeifa Corrales
- Date of birth: 30 December 1984 (age 41)
- Place of birth: San José, Costa Rica
- Height: 1.82 m (6 ft 0 in)
- Position: Midfielder

Youth career
- 1997–2001: Saprissa

Senior career*
Years	Team	Apps	(Gls)
2001–2006	Saprissa	48	(26)
2006–2011	K.A.A. Gent	140	(40)
2011–2013	Gençlerbirliği	70	(7)
2013–2014	Kayseri Erciyesspor	17	(1)
2014	CS Uruguay	10	(1)
2015–2021	Herediano	230	(46)
2021–2023	Sporting San José	31	(11)
Total		546	(132)

International career
2005–2018	Costa Rica	60	(3)
- * Club domestic league appearances and goals

Randall Azofeifa Corrales (born 30 December 1984) is a Costa Rican former footballer who played as a midfielder.

== Club career ==
Azofeifa won two national championship, the UNCAF Nations Cup title and a CONCACAF Champions Cup title with Deportivo Saprissa. He participated in the 2005 FIFA Club World Championship with his team, where he played a key role in helping them to finish in third place, behind São Paulo and Liverpool. Azofeifa joined Belgian Jupiler League club Gent in 2006.

=== Turkey ===
In January 2011 he was transferred to the Turkish team Gençlerbirliği at a transfer price of 1.6 million Euros and in May 2013 he moved on to Kayseri Erciyesspor.

In September 2014, Azofeifa returned to Costa Rica to play for Uruguay Coronado and in January 2015 he joined Herediano.

== International career ==
Azofeifa played at the 2001 FIFA U-17 World Championship held in Trinidad and Tobago. As of January 2014, Azofeifa has made 35 appearances for the senior Costa Rica national football team, including qualifying matches for the 2006 FIFA World Cup and 2010 FIFA World Cup. He made one appearance for Costa Rica at the 2006 World Cup. Azofeifa appeared in four matches at the 2007 CONCACAF Gold Cup.

In May 2018 he was named in Costa Rica's 23 man squad for the 2018 FIFA World Cup in Russia.

== Honours ==
K.A.A. Gent

- Belgian Cup: 2009–10

== Career statistics ==
=== International ===
As of 27 June 2018

Costa Rica
Year	Apps	Goals
2005	2	0
2006	7	0
2007	7	0
2008	4	1
2009	3	0
2010	3	0
2011	6	0
2012	3	0
2013	0	0
2014	0	0
2015	2	0
2016	10	2
2017	9	0
2018	2	0
Total	58	3

=== International goals ===
Scores and results list. Costa Rica's goal tally first.

#	Date	Venue	Opponent	Score	Result	Competition
1.	21 June 2008	Estadio Ricardo Saprissa, San José, Costa Rica	Grenada	3–0	3–0	2010 World Cup qualifier
2.	2 September 2016	Stade Sylvio Cator, Port-au-Prince, Haiti	Haiti	1–0	1–0	2018 World Cup qualifier
3.	8 October 2016	Krasnodar Stadium, Krasnodar, Russia	Russia	1–0	4–3	Friendly
