= Ertuğrul Seçme =

Turkish football manager (born 1965)

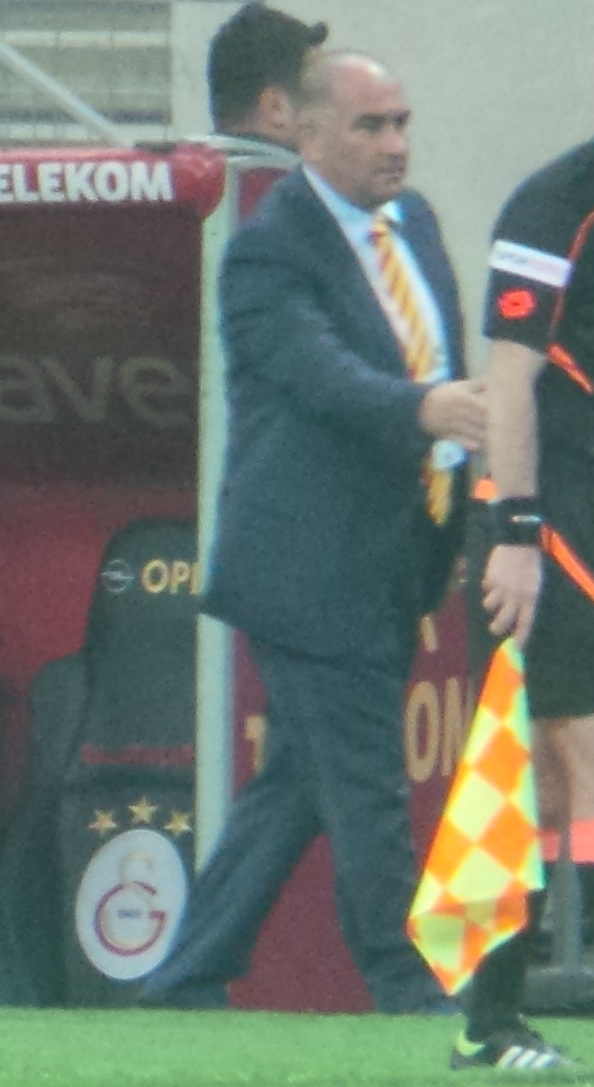

Personal information
- Full name: Ertuğrul Seçme
- Date of birth: 7 November 1965 (age 60)
- Place of birth: Ankara, Turkey
- Height: 1.70 m (5 ft 7 in)

Managerial career
- Years: Team
- 2000–2014: Kayserispor (youth)
- 2014–2015: Kayserispor

Ertuğrul Seçme (born 7 November 1965 in Ankara) is a former Turkish technical director.
