= Kayseri Erciyesspor =

Turkish sports club

- Full name: Kayseri Erciyesspor
- Nicknames: Mavi Ejder (Blue Dragons); Panterler (Panthers)
- Founded: 1 June 1966; 60 years ago
- Dissolved: 2018; 8 years ago
- Ground: Kayseri Atatürk Spor Kompleksi Yan Açık Saha; Kayseri
- Capacity: 1,500
- Chairman: Saffet Külahçı
- 2017–18: TFF Third League, 18th (Relegation)
Home colours	Away colours

Kayseri Erciyesspor was a Turkish sports club based in Kayseri.

== History ==
In 1965, Orhan Şefik Apak, then president of the Turkish Football Federation, asked cities in Turkey to combine their amateur football clubs into one singular club that would represent their communities. These new clubs would compete in the newly created 2.Lig (Second Division). After several meetings, representatives of the city merged Erciyesspor, Sanayispor, and Ortaanadoluspor to form Kayserispor. The club submitted the required paperwork and were officially founded as Kayserispor on 1 July 1966. They began competing in the 1966–67 2.Lig. Erdoğan Gürhan was the first manager, signing a contract worth 1,500 TL. In their first season, the club competed in the Beyaz Grup (White Group). Yener scored the first goal in club history when he netted a shot in the 17th minute against Ankara Toprakspor. The club finished with a nine win, nine draw, and twelve loss record in 30 matches while scoring 21 goals and conceding 33. They finished in ninth place.

Kayserispor were promoted to the 1.Lig for the first time at the end of the 1972–73 season. They were also relegated for the first time in 1974–75, and competed in the 2.Lig until 1978–79. Kayserispor defeated Galatasaray in the quarter-finals of the 1977–78 Türkiye Kupası, and reached the semi-finals for the first time. They went on to lose to Adana Demirspor. In 1978, Tamer Kaptan, manager of the club at the time, brought Johan Cruyff's Total Football system to Kayserispor after watching the Netherlands national football team in the 1978 FIFA World Cup. The club proceeded to score 66 goals that season, which ranked them second in Europe behind English club Liverpool F.C. The club were promoted again at the end of the 1978–79 after beating Ankaragücü 3–0 at promotion play-off, but were relegated at the end of the following season. Kayserispor were promoted to the 1. Lig again in 1984–85, but were once again relegated the following year. They would continue competing in the 2.Lig until the end of the 1991–92 season except playing in third level between 1989 and 1991. The club set a record for most managers in a season when they hired and fired eight coaches throughout the 1988–89 season. Kayserispor reached a low point when they were relegated to the 3. Lig the following season. Kayserispor returned to 1. Lig after successively 2 promotions between 1990 and 1992.

Kayserispor started 1. Lig in 1992–93 season with 7–2 away defeat to Kocaelispor, also newcomer but managed to remain in it. They reached to 11th position in 1994–95 season but were relegated again to 2nd League at the end of the following season. They returned to top level at first attempt, but this return lasted one season after finishing behind Gençlerbirliği and Gaziantepspor due to goal average

Kayserispor stayed in second level until 2003–2004 season. After the season Kayseri Erciyesspor promoted to Super League. Before the start of 2004–2005 season, 2 teams of Kayseri switched their names, chairmen and managers. Thus, Kayserispor became Kayseri Erciyesspor and changed their colours as blue-black. They finished 2nd level as 3rd and thus returned to top level after 7 seasons. They finished Super League with respectable 10th place in 2005–2006 season. But they were relegated to second level end of the following season despite becoming runner-up to Turkish Cup, went to Beşiktaş. Kayseri Erciyesspor played in First League again between 2007 and 2013 before returning to top level as champions. The past four seasons the club relegated four times in a row, resulting competing in the Turkish Regional Amateur League in the 2018–19 season. However, prior to the start of the season the club withdrew itself from participating in the Turkish Regional Amateur League.

== 1967 Kayseri Stadium disaster ==
Kayseri Erciyesspor were involved in the worst cases of crowd violence in Turkish football history in which 43 people lost their lives and around 300 people were injured.

The match took place on 17 September 1967 against neighboring city rivals Sivasspor. Sivasspor supporters traveled to the city of Kayseri by 20 minibuses, 40 coaches and by train. Minor disturbances and unrest were reported around the city and the Sivasspor fans were accused of acts of hooliganism and vandalism.

The match kicked off at 16:00 in front of 21,000 fans in the Kayseri Atatürk Stadium, the troubles started in the 20th minute when Kayserispor's Küçük Oktay scored. Witnesses at the game reported that Sivasspor supporters responded by hurling rocks and stones at the Kayserispor stands. The incident resulted in the Kayserispor fans panicking and two children lost their lives in the resulting crowd crush.

Kayserispor fans retaliated by marching onto the Sivasspor supporters with stones, sticks and knives. The outnumbered Sivas fans tried to flee however, the exit gate malfunctioned and wouldn't open, this caused a crush in which 41 people died and 300 were injured as a result of being stamped on and suffocated. Both sides were banned from having supporters at their games for the rest of the season and they were not allowed to play each other for 5 years. The disaster also caused enmity between the cities of Kayseri and Sivas. They finally met in 4th Group of 3rd League in 1990–91 season and the enmity was turned to peaceful rivalry.

== Honours ==
- TFF First League
  - Winners (1): 2012–13
- Turkish Cup
  - Runners-up (1): 2007

== Team stats ==
=== League affiliation ===
- Turkish Super League: 1973–75, 1979–80, 1985–86, 1992–96, 1997–98, 2005–07, 2013–2015
- TFF First League: 1966–73, 1975–79, 1980–85, 1986–89, 1991–92, 1996–97, 1998–05, 2007–13, 2015–16
- TFF Second League: 1989–91, 2016–17
- TFF Third League: 2017–2018

=== Continental competitions ===
As of 4 October 2007

Competition	Pld	W	D	L	GF	GA	GD
UEFA Cup	4	1	1	2	4	11	–7

UEFA Cup:

Season	Round	Club	Home	Away	Aggregate
2007–08	Q2	(Israel) Maccabi Tel Aviv	3–1	1–1	4–2
2007–08	1R	(Spain) Atlético Madrid	0–5	0–4	0–9

== Managers ==
- (Turkey) Samet Aybaba (21 Jan 1993 – 8 July 1994), (2 Jan 1996 – 25 July 1997)
- (Germany) Werner Lorant (5 Oct 2006 – 12 Jan 2007)
- (Turkey) Can Küçükserim (12 Jan 2007 – 3 Aug 2007)
- (Turkey) Mehmet Bulut (3 Aug 2007 – 23 Oct 2008)
- (Turkey) Mustafa Uğur (24 Oct 2008 – 13 Feb 2009)
- (Turkey) Osman Yozgat (13 Feb 2009 – 30 June 2009)
- (Turkey) Mustafa Altindag (5 Aug 2009 – 7 Dec 2009)
- (Turkey) Ergün Penbe (2 March 2011 – 31 May 2011)
- (Turkey) Fikret Yılmaz (1 June 2011 – 1 Jan 2012)
- (Turkey) Kemalettin Şentürk (1 Jan 2012 – 31 May 2012)
- (Turkey) Osman Özköylü (1 July 2012 – 13 May 2013)
- (Turkey) Fuat Çapa (15 June 2013 – 21 Dec 2013)
- (Turkey) Hikmet Karaman (23 Dec 2013 – 3 June 2014)
- (Turkey) Bülent Korkmaz (30 July 2014 – 24 November 2014)
- (Turkey) Uğur Tütüneker (3 Dec 2014 – 8 Jan 2015)
- (Turkey) Mehmet Özdilek (10 Jan 2015 – 24 March 2015)
- (Turkey) Fatih Tekke (29 March 2015 – 31 May 2015)
- (Turkey) Mustafa Şimşek Özkeş (1 June 2015 – 13 Oct 2015)
- (Turkey) Timuçin Bayazıt (16 Oct 2015 – 10 March 2016)
- (Turkey) Sait Karafırtınalar (14 March 2016 – 31 May 2016)
- (Turkey) Mustafa Şimşek Özkeş (1 June 2016 – 31 May 2017)
- (Turkey) Ertuğrul Seçme (25 August 2017 – 31 May 2018)

== Notable players ==
=== Asia ===
==== Kazakhstan ====
- Ali Aliyev

=== Algeria ===
- (Algeria) Sofiane Hanni
- Ziri Hammar

=== Ghana ===
- (Ghana) John Boye

=== Ivory Coast ===
- (Ivory Coast) Gerard Gohou

Nigeria

- (Nigeria) Iyayi Atiemwen

=== Senegal ===
- Kader Mangane
- Pape Diakhaté

=== Cameroon ===
- Jacques Zoua
- Georges Mandjeck

=== Costa Rica ===
- Randall Azofeifa
- Hansell Arauz

Europe
Bosnia and Herzegovina

- (Bosnia and Herzegovina) Senijad Ibričić
- (Bosnia and Herzegovina) Eldin Adilović

Bulgaria

- (Bulgaria) Zdravko Lazarov

=== Belgium ===
- Björn Vleminckx

=== Macedonia ===
- Stefan Ashkovski

Netherlands

- (Netherlands) Royston Drenthe

Turkey

- (Turkey) Yasin Öztekin
- (Turkey) Serdar Gürler
- Murat Yildirim
- İlhan Parlak
- Necati Ateş

=== Portugal ===
- Edinho
