= 2013–14 Mersin İdmanyurdu season =

Mersin İdmanyurdu
2013–14 season
- President: (Turkey) Ali Kahramanlı
- Head coach: (Turkey) Hakan Kutlu (till 6 March 2014) (Turkey) Yılmaz Vural (till 16 May 2014) (Turkey) Hakan Kutlu (till 31 May 2014)
- Stadium: Mersin Arena (Capacity: 25,497); Tevfik Sırrı Gür Stadium (Capacity: 10,128); Mersin, Turkey
- TFF First League: 6th + Play-offs winner (Promoted)
- Turkish Cup: Eliminated at Round 2
- Most appearances: (Turkey) Güven Varol (36)
- Top goalscorer: League: (Turkey) Güven Varol (11); All: (Turkey) Güven Varol (11)
Home colours	Away colours	Third colours

Mersin İdmanyurdu (also Mersin İdman Yurdu, Mersin İY, or MİY) Sports Club; located in Mersin, east Mediterranean coast of Turkey in 2013–14. Team participated in 13th season of the league for 7th time. Mersin İdmanyurdu football team has finished 2013–14 season in 6th place in Turkish TFF First League and became eligible to play play-off games. At the end of play-off games MİY has promoted to 2014–15 Süper Lig after one year disappearance. Mersin İdmanyurdu participated in 2013–14 Turkish Cup and was eliminated in second elimination round.

Ali Kahramanlı was club president. Hakan Kutlu has continued from previous season as head coach. Later Yılmaz Vural took over the team. Kutlu managed the final game. Güven Varol was both most appeared player and top goalscorer.

== 2013–14 TFF First League participation ==
Mersin İdmanyurdu took place in 2013–14 TFF First League. League was played as PTT First League for sponsorship reasons. 19 teams attended due to return of Ankaraspor who were withdrawn from the league in 2010–11 season and reserved their right to attend depending on a court decision. Winners, runners-up and play-off winners were promoted to 2014–15 Süper Lig. Play-offs were played among four teams who finished season at 3rd thru 6th positions. Bottom four teams were relegated to 2014–15 TFF Second League.

Mersin İdmanyurdu finished 2013–14 TFF First League season at 6th place and was qualified for play-offs. Team won the play-offs and promoted to 2014–15 Süper Lig at the end of the season.

=== Results summary ===
Mersin İdmanyurdu (MİY) 2013–14 TFF First League season league summary.

	Overall									Home								Away							
Stage	Pc	Pl	W	D	L	GF	GA	GD	Pt	Pl	W	D	L	GF	GA	GD	Pt	Pl	W	D	L	GF	GA	GD	Pt
First half	6	18	9	6	3	32	19	+13	33	9	5	2	2	18	8	+10	17	9	4	4	1	14	11	+3	16
Second half		18	7	6	5	24	24	0	27	9	5	3	1	13	6	+7	18	9	2	3	4	11	18	-7	9
Overall	6	36	16	12	8	56	43	+13	60	18	10	5	3	31	14	+17	35	18	6	7	5	25	29	-4	25

Sources: 2013–14 TFF First League pages.

=== League table ===
Mersin İdmanyurdu (MİY) 2013–14 TFF First League season place in league table.

Pos	Team	Pld	W	D	L	GF	GA	GD	Pts	Qualification or relegation
4	Ankaraspor	36	18	12	6	61	35	+26	66	Qualification for Promotion Playoffs
5	Samsunspor	36	17	14	5	61	36	+25	65	Qualification for Promotion Playoffs
6	Mersin İdmanyurdu (O, P)	36	16	12	8	56	43	+13	60	Qualification for Promotion Playoffs
7	Manisaspor	36	16	6	14	55	47	+8	54	
8	Karşıyaka	36	13	10	13	51	49	+2	49	

Source: tff.org
Rules for classification: 1) points; 2) goal difference; 3) number of goals scored.
(O) Play-off winners; (P) Promoted

=== Results by round ===
Results of games MİY played in 2013–14 TFF First League by rounds.

Round	1	2	3	4	5	6	7	8	9	10	11	12	13	14	15	16	17	18	19	20	21	22	23	24	25	26	27	28	29	30	31	32	33	34	35	36	37	38
Ground	B	A	H	A	H	A	H	A	H	A	H	A	H	A	H	A	H	A	H	B	H	A	H	A	H	A	H	A	H	A	H	A	H	A	H	A	H	A
Result		D	W	L	W	W	W	W	L	D	D	W	L	D	W	D	D	W	W		W	D	W	W	D	L	W	L	W	W	D	D	L	D	W	L	D	L
Position	11	14	7	10	6	4	3	3	4	5	5	5	5	7	5	6	6	6	6	6	6	6	5	5	5	6	6	6	5	5	5	6	6	6	6	6	6	6

Updated to match(es) played on 29 October 2014. Source: TFF League page
A = Away; H = Home; B = Bye; W = Win; D = Draw; L = Loss

=== First half ===
Mersin İdmanyurdu (MİY) 2013–14 TFF First League season first half game reports is shown in the following table. Kick off times are in EET and EEST.

18 August 2013 Round 1	Mersin İdmanyurdu	v	BYE
Sunday, 20:00

25 September 2013 Round 2	Orduspor	0 – 0	Mersin İdmanyurdu	19 Eylül Stadium, Ordu
Sunday, 20:00	Branimir Subašić (yellow card) 61'; Selçuk Özkan (yellow card) 86'	Report	(yellow card) 12' Murat Ceylan; (yellow card) 41' Nduka Ozokwo	Referee: Serkan Tokat

31 August 2013 Round 3	Mersin İdmanyurdu	3 – 0	Karşıyaka	Tevfik Sırrı Gür Stadium, Mersin
Sunday, 20:00	Mahmut Temür 27' (F); Güven Varol 52' (F); Kenan Şahin 69' (F); Milan Mitrović (yellow card) 40'	Report	(yellow card) 61' Rıdvan Şimşek	Referee: Özgüç Türkalp

14 September 2013 Round 4	Manisaspor	3 – 2	Mersin İdmanyurdu	19 Mayıs Stadium, Manisa
Saturday, 20:00	Bekir Yılmaz 27' (F); Slavko Perović 49' (F); Murat Gürbüzerol 52' (F); Hüsnü Başkurt (yellow card) 8'; Ali Fırat Okur (red card) 42'; Ümit Yasin Arslan (yellow card) 44'; Umut Sözen (yellow card) 48'; Hikmet Balioğlu (yellow card) 89'	Report	8' (pen.) Raheem Lawal; 43' (F) Anıl Karaer; (yellow card) 44' (red card) Raheem Lawal	Referee: Abdullah Yılmaz

18 September 2013 Round 5	Mersin İdmanyurdu	4 – 1	Kahramanmaraşspor	Tevfik Sırrı Gür Stadium, Mersin
Wednesday, 20:00	Mahmut Temür 7' (F); Mahmut Temür 12' (F); Mehmet Yıldız 16' (F); Ali Tandoğan 32' (F); Murat Ceylan (yellow card) 22'; Nurullah Kaya (yellow card) 83'	Report	63' (F) Ganiyu Oseni; (yellow card) 22' Izu Azuka; (yellow card) 43' İrfan Başaran	Referee: Abdulkadir Bitigen

23 September 2013 Round 6	İstanbul BŞB	2 – 3	Mersin İdmanyurdu	Atatürk Olympic Stadium, Istanbul
Monday, 20:00	Murat Yılmaz 28' (F); Ömer Can Sokullu 45' (F); Alaattin Tosun (yellow card) 44'; Orhan Taşdelen (yellow card) 47' (red card); Murat Yılmaz (yellow card) 77'; Oğuzhan Bahadır (yellow card) 88'	Report	37' (F) Mehmet Yıldız; 65' (F) Nurullah Kaya; 89' (F) Güven Varol; (yellow card) 78' Mehmet Yıldız; (yellow card) 82' Nurullah Kaya	Referee: Çağatay Şahan

28 September 2013 Round 7	Mersin İdmanyurdu	2 – 0	TKİ Tavşanlı Linyitspor	Tevfik Sırrı Gür Stadium, Mersin
SaturdaY, 19:00	Mehmet Yıldız 71' (H); Emrah Bozkurt 90+2' (F); Murat Ceylan (yellow card) 22'; Milan Mitrović (yellow card) 37'	Report	(yellow card) 37' Cafercan Aksu; (yellow card) 56' Nduka Usim; (yellow card) 89' Emrah Dağ	Referee: Mustafa Aydin

6 October 2013 Round 8	Fethiyespor	0 – 1	Mersin İdmanyurdu	Fethiye Stadium, Fethiye, Muğla
Sunday, 19:00	Ali Dere (yellow card) 73'; Sabri Turgut (yellow card) 90+4' (red card)	Report	44' (F) Mahmut Temür	Referee: Kutluhan Bilgiç

21 October 2013 Round 9	Mersin İdmanyurdu	0 – 1	Denizlispor	Tevfik Sırrı Gür Stadium, Mersin
Monday, 20:00	Nduka Ozokwo (yellow card) 53'; Mahmut Temür (yellow card) 63'	Report	52' (F) Bülent Ertuğrul; (yellow card) 29' Süleyman Çelikyurt; (yellow card) 53' Levent Demiray; (yellow card) 54' Ömer Kandemir; (yellow card) 63' Bülent Ertuğrul; (yellow card) 74' Ozan Evrim Özenç; (yellow card) 76' Şevki Çınar; (yellow card) 80' Barış Örücü; (yellow card) 82' Ahmet Arı; (yellow card) 90+3' Cihan Özkaymak	Referee: Volkan Bayarslan

27 October 2013 Round 10	Adana Demirspor	1 – 1	Mersin İdmanyurdu	5 Ocak Stadium, Adana
Sunday, 19:00	Mehmet Eren Boyraz 1' (F); Ferhat Çökmüş (yellow card) 90+4'	Report	30' (F) Raheem Lawal; (yellow card) 49' Murat Ceylan; (yellow card) 61' Milan Mitrović	Referee: Yunus Yıldırım

3 November 2013 Round 11	Mersin İdmanyurdu	0 – 0	Boluspor	Tevfik Sırrı Gür Stadium, Mersin
Sunday, 16:30	Mehmet Yıldız (yellow card) 37'; Anıl Karaer (yellow card) 54'; Ali Tandoğan (red card) 60'	Report	(yellow card) 25' Abdülkadir Kayalı; (yellow card) 64' Alp Ergin; (yellow card) 69' Alican Karadağ; (yellow card) 83' Cemil Vatansever	Referee: Serkan Tokat

7 October 2013 Round 12	Gaziantep BŞB	0 – 1	Mersin İdmanyurdu	Kamil Ocak Stadium, Gaziantep
Thursday, 19:00	Kenan Aslanoğlu (yellow card) 32'	Report	1' (F) Raheem Lawal; (yellow card) 42' Nurullah Kaya; (yellow card) 90' Mahmut Bezgin; (yellow card) 90+1' Eren Tozlu	Referee: Ferhan Kestanlıoğlu

10 November 2013 Round 13	Mersin İdmanyurdu	0 – 1	1461 Trabzon	Tevfik Sırrı Gür Stadium, Mersin
Sunday, 19:00	Kenan Şahin (yellow card) 31'; Murat Ceylan (yellow card) 59' (red card); Milan Mitrović (yellow card) 80'; Raheem Lawal (yellow card) 88'	Report	58' (F) Oktay Demircan; (yellow card) 18' Göksu Alhas; (yellow card) 80' Aytaç Ak; (yellow card) 83' Oktay Demircan	Referee: Hakan Ceylan

24 November 2013 Round 14	Balıkesirspor	1 – 1	Mersin İdmanyurdu	Atatürk Stadium, Balıkesir
Sunday, 14:00	Burak Çalık 72' (F); Ertuğrul Arslan (yellow card) 17'; Rıza Efendioğlu (yellow card) 22'; Murat Sözgelmez (yellow card) 26'; İsmail Dinler (yellow card) 58'; Caner Arıcı (yellow card) 75'	Report	59' (pen.) Raheem Lawal; (yellow card) 64' Mehmet Yıldız; (yellow card) 77' Eren Tozlu; (yellow card) 80' Ömer Alp Kulga; (yellow card) 82' Mahmut Bezgin	Referee: Suat Arslanboğa

30 November 2013 Round 15	Mersin İdmanyurdu	5 – 4	Samsunspor	Tevfik Sırrı Gür Stadium, Mersin
Saturday, 14:00	Mehmet Yıldız 56' (F); Emrah Bozkurt 59' (F); Emrah Bozkurt 74' (F); Mehmet Yıldız 85' (F); Raheem Lawal 94' (F); Nduka Ozokwo (yellow card) 25'; Wissem Ben Yahia (yellow card) 28'; Mahmut Temür (yellow card) 33'; Güven Varol (yellow card) 42'; Mehmet Yıldız (yellow card) 45'; Emrah Bozkurt (yellow card) 75'; Anıl Karaer (yellow card) 90+4'; Raheem Lawal (yellow card) 90+4'	Report	5' (F) Erdem Şen; 10' (F) Aminu Umar; 17' (F) Aminu Umar; 70' (F) Musa Sinan Yılmazer; (yellow card) 57' Musa Aydın; (yellow card) 70' Eldin Adilović; (yellow card) 80' Musa Sinan Yılmazer; (yellow card) 85' Şaban Özel; (yellow card) 89' (red card) Doğan Erdoğan	Referee: Murat Özcan

9 December 2013 Round 16	Bucaspor	2 – 2	Mersin İdmanyurdu	Yeni Buca Stadı, Buca, İzmir
Monday, 20:00	Emre Şahin 39' (H); Emre Şahin 61' (F); Batuhan İşçiler (yellow card) 41'; Zafer Çevik (yellow card) 63'	Report	73' (H) Adem Güven; 82' (F) Eren Tozlu; (yellow card) 43' Nurullah Kaya; (yellow card) 62' Nduka Ozokwo	Referee: Fırat Aydınus

15 December 2013 Round 17	Mersin İdmanyurdu	1 – 1	Ankaraspor	Tevfik Sırrı Gür Stadium, Mersin
Sunday, 19:00	Güven Varol 59' (H); Efe Özarslan (yellow card) 15'	Report	84' (H) Müslüm Yelken; (yellow card) 53' Sofiane Hanni; (yellow card) 64' Abdullah Karmil; (yellow card) 71' Lokman Gör; (yellow card) 89' Furkan Şeker	Referee: Kutluhan Bilgiç

21 December 2013 Round 18	Şanlıurfaspor	2 – 3	Mersin İdmanyurdu	Şanlıurfa GAP Stadium, Şanlıurfa
Saturday, 19:00	Youssef Yeşilmen 3' (F); İsmail Haktan Odabaşı 91' (F); Emmanuel Banahene (yellow card) 23'; Abdulhamit Yıldız (yellow card) 44'; Mehmet Ozan Tahtaişleyen (yellow card) 45'; İsmail Haktan Odabaşı (yellow card) 89'	Report	19' (F) Güven Varol; 66' (F) Mehmet Yıldız; 86' (F) Wissem Ben Yahia; (yellow card) 45' Mehmet Yıldız; (yellow card) 74' Eren Tozlu	Referee: Mustafa Kamil Abitoğlu

29 December 2013 Round 19	Mersin İdmanyurdu	3 – 0	Adanaspor	Tevfik Sırrı Gür Stadium, Mersin
Sunday, 19:00	Nduka Ozokwo 58' (H); Güven Varol 58' (F); Mahmut Temür 77' (F); Milan Mitrović (yellow card) 25'; Wissem Ben Yahia (yellow card) 73'	Report	(yellow card) 73' Veli Kızılkaya; (red card) 88' Yiğitcan Gölboyu	Referee: Mustafa Aydin

Sources: 2013–14 PTT First League pages.

=== Second half ===
Mersin İdmanyurdu (MİY) 2013–14 TFF First League season second half game reports is shown in the following table. Kick off times are in EET and EEST.

12 January 2014 Round 20	BYE	v	Mersin İdmanyurdu
Sunday, 13:30

20 January 2014 Round 21	Mersin İdmanyurdu	1 – 0	Orduspor	Tevfik Sırrı Gür Stadium, Mersin
Monday, 20:00	Güven Varol 5' (F)	Report	(yellow card) 86' Mustafa Tuna Kaya	Referee: Deniz Çoban

25 January 2014 Round 22	Karşıyaka	0 – 0	Mersin İdmanyurdu	Alsancak Stadium, İzmir
Saturday, 19:00	Rıdvan Şimşek (yellow card) 3'; Burak Karaduman (yellow card) 35'; Mustafa Sevgi (yellow card) 72'	Report	(yellow card) 28' Ali Tandoğan; (yellow card) 86' (red card) Anıl Karaer	Referee: Mete Kalkavan

1 February 2014 Round 23	Mersin İdmanyurdu	1 – 0	Manisaspor	Tevfik Sırrı Gür Stadium, Mersin
Saturday, 14:00	Wissem Ben Yahia 77' (F); Nurullah Kaya (yellow card) 51'; Nduka Ozokwo (yellow card) 71'; Wissem Ben Yahia (yellow card) 90'	Report	(yellow card) 21' Slavko Perović; (yellow card) 28' Murat Gürbüzerol; (yellow card) 29' Eray Ataseven; (yellow card) 75' Ümit Yasin Arslan	Referee: Onur Karabaş

8 February 2014 Round 24	Kahramanmaraşspor	0 – 2	Mersin İdmanyurdu	12 Şubat Stadium, Kahramanmaraş
Saturday, 19:00	Adem Aydın (yellow card) 47'; Engin Kalender (yellow card) 74'; Akın Açık (yellow card) 83'; Sinan Kurumuş (yellow card) 89'; Sinan Turan (yellow card) 89'	Report	28' (H) Emrah Bozkurt; 89' (F) Veli Acar; (yellow card) 33' Mehmet Yıldız; (yellow card) 42' Nduka Ozokwo; (yellow card) 47' Milan Mitrović; (yellow card) 66' (red card) Güven Varol; (yellow card) 90' Eren Tozlu	Referee: Kutluhan Bilgiç

16 February 2014 Round 25	Mersin İdmanyurdu	2 – 2	İstanbul BŞB	Tevfik Sırrı Gür Stadium, Mersin
Sunday, 13:00	Anıl Karaer 6' (F); Anıl Karaer 68' (F); Anıl Karaer (yellow card) 37'; Mahmut Temür (red card) 87'; Milan Mitrović (yellow card) 90+2'	Report	10' (F) Mehmet Batdal; 60' (F) İbrahim Yılmaz; (yellow card) 30' Orhan Taşdelen; (yellow card) 43' Sedat Ağçay	Referee: Abdullah Yılmaz

19 February 2014 Round 26	TKİ Tavşanlı Linyitspor	4 – 0	Mersin İdmanyurdu	Dumlupinar Stadium, Kütahya
Wednesday, 13:30	Akeem Agbetu 35' (pen.); Luciano Guaycochea 47' (F); Ersin Veli 60' (H); Özgür Can Özcan 64' (F); Emrah Dağ (yellow card) 41'; Ahmet Topal (yellow card) 69'	Report	(yellow card) 34' Anıl Karaer; (yellow card) 52' Mehmet Yıldız	Referee: Serkan Tokat

23 February 2014 Round 27	Mersin İdmanyurdu	3 – 1	Fethiyespor	Tevfik Sırrı Gür Stadium, Mersin
Sunday, 13:30	Güven Varol 33' (H); Nduka Ozokwo 56' (H); Adem Güven 87' (F); Ali Tandoğan (yellow card) 36'; Veli Acar (yellow card) 38'; Wissem Ben Yahia (yellow card) 78'	Report	67' (F) İrfan Başaran; (yellow card) 60' İrfan Başaran; (yellow card) 90' Gökhan Dincer	Referee: Mustafa İlker Coşkun

2 March 2014 Round 28	Denizlispor	2 – 0	Mersin İdmanyurdu	Atatürk Stadium, Denizli
Sunday, 14:00	Şevki Çınar 64' (F); Iliyan Yordanov 71' (F)	Report	(yellow card) 11' Berkan Afşarlı; (yellow card) 80' Cem Sultan	Referee: Hakan Ceylan

10 March 2014 Round 29	Mersin İdmanyurdu	2 – 0	Adana Demirspor	Tevfik Sırrı Gür Stadium, Mersin
Monday, 20:00	Mehmet Yıldız 25' (pen.); Wissem Ben Yahia 73' (F); Efe Özarslan (yellow card) 68'	Report	(yellow card) 13' Oğuzhan Berber; (yellow card) 24' Ferhat Çökmüş; (yellow card) 39' Dorge Kouemaha; (yellow card) 70' Timur Bayram Özgöz; (yellow card) 83' Özgür Öçal; (yellow card) 89' Mehmet Eren Boyraz	Referee: Serkan Çınar

16 March 2014 Round 30	Boluspor	1 – 2	Mersin İdmanyurdu	Bolu Atatürk Stadium, Bolu
Sunday, 13:30	Emre Kılınç 20' (F); Hakan Arslan (yellow card) 49'; Adem Alkaşi (yellow card) 68'; Daniel Zlatkov (yellow card) 89'	Report	18' (H) Mehmet Yıldız; 66' (F) Güven Varol	Referee: Mete Kalkavan

23 March 2014 Round 31	Mersin İdmanyurdu	0 – 0	Gaziantep BŞB	Mersin Stadium, Mersin
Sunday, 19:00	Sinan Kaloğlu (yellow card) 61'; Efe Özarslan (yellow card) 87'; Ali Tandoğan (yellow card) 90+3'	Report	(yellow card) 35' Erhan Şentürk; (yellow card) 44' Ramazan Altıntepe; (yellow card) 79' İsa Akgöl	Referee: Mustafa Öğretmenoğlu

29 March 2014 Round 32	1461 Trabzon	2 – 2	Mersin İdmanyurdu	Hüseyin Avni Aker Stadium, Trabzon
Saturday, 13:30	Göksu Alhas 11' (o.g.); Shaibu Yakubu 20' (F); Alim Öztürk 89' (pen.); Mehmet Kuruoğlu (yellow card) 9'; Oğulcan Gökçe (yellow card) 29'; Aytaç Ak (yellow card) 55'; Mustafa Tiryaki (yellow card) 78' (red card)	Report	65' (H) Anıl Karaer; (yellow card) 47' Cem Sultan; (yellow card) 71' Veli Acar; (yellow card) 89' Anıl Karaer	Referee: Onur Karabaş

2 April 2014 Round 33	Mersin İdmanyurdu	0 – 1	Balıkesirspor	Tevfik Sırrı Gür Stadium, Mersin
Wednesday 19:00	Ali Tandoğan (yellow card) 51'; Milan Mitrović (yellow card) 79'; Anıl Karaer (yellow card) 83'	Report	50' (F) Muhammet Reis; (yellow card) 5' Aykut Çeviker; (yellow card) 83' Uğur Akdemir; (yellow card) 86' Muhammet Reis	Referee: Alper Ulusoy

7 April 2014 Round 34	Samsunspor	3 – 3	Mersin İdmanyurdu	19 Mayıs Stadium, Samsun
Monday, 20:00	Taha Yalçıner 31' (F); Ekigho Ehiosun 71' (F); Ekigho Ehiosun 73' (F); Adnan Güngör (yellow card) 25'; Soner Şahin (yellow card) 38'; Tuna Üzümcü (yellow card) 47'; Taha Yalçıner (yellow card) 79'	Report	57' (F) Cem Sultan; 61' (F) Mehmet Yıldız; 88' (F) Berkan Afşarlı; (yellow card) 7' Wissem Ben Yahia; (yellow card) 52' Nurullah Kaya; (yellow card) 58' Güven Varol; (yellow card) 69' Ivan Perić	Referee: Serkan Çınar

13 April 2014 Round 35	Mersin İdmanyurdu	3 – 1	Bucaspor	Mersin Stadium, Mersin
Sunday, 13:30	Ali Tandoğan 34' (F); Güven Varol 61' (F); Wissem Ben Yahia (yellow card) 36'; Berkan Afşarlı (red card) 45'; Milan Mitrović (yellow card) 71'; Ali Tandoğan (yellow card) 80'	Report	7' (o.g.) Luiz Henrique; 86' (H) Zafer Çevik; (yellow card) 33' Luiz Henrique	Attendance: Played without spectators Referee: Halis Özkahya

20 April 2014 Round 36	Ankaraspor	3 – 1	Mersin İdmanyurdu	Yenikent Asaş Stadium, Ankara
Sunday, 13:30	Tonia Tisdell 44' (H); Serkan Atak 82' (H); Galip Güzel 87' (F); Lokman Gör (yellow card) 42' (red card); Abdullah Karmil (yellow card) 78'	Report	78' (H) Anıl Karaer; (yellow card) 90+2' Efe Özarslan	Referee: Deniz Çoban

27 April 2014 Round 37	Mersin İdmanyurdu	1 – 1	Şanlıurfaspor	Mersin Stadium, Mersin
Sunday, 17:00	Ali Tandoğan 26' (F)	Report	64' (F) Sezer Badur; (yellow card) 88' Abdulhamit Yıldız	Referee: Kutluhan Bilgiç

4 May 2014 Round 38	Adanaspor	3 – 1	Mersin İdmanyurdu	5 Ocak Fatih Terim Stadium, Adana
Sunday, 16:00	Ahmet Dereli 22' (H); Ahmet Dereli 66' (H); Talha Mayhoş 70' (F); Ahmet Bahçıvan (yellow card) 30'; Turhan Alper Turgut (yellow card) 81'	Report	90+1' (F) Mahmut Temür; (yellow card) 33' Ivan Perić; (yellow card) 64' Adem Güven	Referee: Murat Özcan

Sources: 2013–14 PTT First League pages.

=== Play-offs ===
Mersin İdmanyurdu (MİY) 2013–14 TFF First League finished the normal season at sixth place and became eligible to play play-off games. After play-off round the team promoted to 2014–15 Süper Lig. Semifinals played in a round-robin elimination rule while final match was played in a neutral venue, Istanbul Şükrü Saracoğlu Stadium, Fenerbahçe's grounds.

Semifinals

At semifinals Mersin İdmanyurdu paired with Orduspor who finished normal season at third place. At semifinals teams played home and away matches. İdmanyurdu won both of the games and promoted to finals.

9 May 2014 Play-off Semifinals	Mersin İdmanyurdu	2 – 1	Orduspor	Mersin Stadium, Mersin
Friday, 21:15	Mehmet Yıldız 43' (F); Wissem Ben Yahia 69' (F); Murat Ceylan (yellow card) 37'; Nduka Ozokwo (yellow card) 61'; Mehmet Yıldız (yellow card) 77'; Wissem Ben Yahia (yellow card) 77'	Report	2' (F) Eren Özen; (yellow card) 15' Volkan Koçaloğlu; (yellow card) 69' Salih Sefercik; (yellow card) 77' Erkan Sekman; (yellow card) 77' Guy-Michel Landel	Referee: Serkan Çınar

13 May 2014 Play-off Semifinals	Orduspor	0 – 1	Mersin İdmanyurdu	19 Eylül Stadium, Ordu
Tuesday, 19:00	Volkan Koçaloğlu (yellow card) 60'; Eren Özen (yellow card) 80'; Alexandru Ioniță (yellow card) 81'	Report	90+6' (F) Güven Varol; (yellow card) 53' Ali Tandoğan; (yellow card) 63' (red card) Nduka Ozokwo; (yellow card) 71' Murat Ceylan; (yellow card) 85' Wissem Ben Yahia; (yellow card) 90+1' Mehmet Yıldız	Referee: Hüseyin Göçek

Sources: 2013–14 PTT First League pages.

Finals

At finals, teams played a single match at a neutral venue. İdmanyurdu defeated Samsunspor who finished normal season at 5th place, and promoted to 2014–15 Süper Lig.

18 May 2014 Play-off Finals	Mersin İdmanyurdu	2 – 0	Samsunspor	Şükrü Saracoğlu Stadium, Istanbul
Sunday, 17:55	Güven Varol 42' (F); Cem Sultan 87' (F); Berkan Afşarlı (yellow card) 45'; Eren Tozlu (yellow card) 57'; Mehmet Yıldız (yellow card) 90'; Wissem Ben Yahia (yellow card) 90'	Report	(yellow card) 39' Musa Sinan Yılmazer; (yellow card) 63' Cemil Adıcan	Referee: Fırat Aydınus

Sources: 2013–14 PTT First League pages.

== 2013–14 Turkish Cup participation ==
2013–14 Turkish Cup was played for 52nd time as Ziraat Türkiye Kupası for sponsorship reasons. The Cup was played by 158 teams in 1 preliminary and 5 one-leg elimination stages and a two-legs group stage in two groups (A, B), after which first and second teams in each group played semifinals. Galatasaray won the Cup for 15th time. Mersin İdmanyurdu took place in second elimination stage and eliminated to then amateur league team Niğde Belediyespor.

=== Cup track ===
The drawings and results Mersin İdmanyurdu (MİY) followed in 2013–14 Turkish Cup are shown in the following table.

Round	Own League	Opponent's League	Opponent	A/H	Score	Result
Round 2	First League	Regional Amateur	Niğde Belediyespor	A	1–3	Eliminated

Note: In the above table 'Score' shows For and Against goals whether the match played at home or not.

=== Game details ===
Mersin İdmanyurdu (MİY) 2013–14 Turkish Cup game reports is shown in the following table. Kick off times are in EET and EEST.

2 October 2013 Round 2	Niğde Belediyespor	3 – 1	Mersin İdmanyurdu	Niğde 5 Şubat Stadium, Niğde
Wednesday, 14:00	Haşim Ateş 15' (F); Murat Balçın 85' (F); Mustafa Taşkın 87' (F); Fatih Durak (yellow card) 61'; Osman Uğurlu (yellow card) 67'; Haşim Ateş (yellow card) 73'; Aytaç Solunoğlu (yellow card) 82'	Report	28' (FH) Murat Kalkan; (yellow card) 67' Ömer Kulga; (yellow card) 82' Kenan Şahin; (yellow card) 90+2' Eren Tozlu	Referee: Emre Malok

Source: 2013–14 Ziraat Türkiye Kupası pages.

== Management ==
President Ali Kahramanlı continued in his position which he held in 2008. * Club address was: Palmiye Mah. Adnan Menderes Bl. 1204 Sk. Onur Ap. K.2 D.3 Yenişehir/Mersin.

=== Club management ===
Club President was Ali Kahramanlı.

=== Coaching team ===
At the start of the season head coach was Hakan Kutlu. His assistants were Hakan Çobanoğlu (trainer), Hail İbrahim Özdemir, Serhat Kandemir and Ercan Akça (physicians), Kemal Gürgez and Barış Demirdizen (masseurs). Yılmaz Vural took the position prior to 29th round derby against Adana Demirspor. Hakan Kutlu signed on 16 May 2014 only for the final game. His contract ended on 31 May 2014.

2012–13 Mersin İdmanyurdu head coaches

Nat	Head coach	Period	Pl	W	D	L	Notes
(Turkey)	Hakan Kutlu	12.07.2013 – 06.03.2014	27	13	8	6	Left after 28th round.
(Turkey)	Yılmaz Vural	20.12.2012 – 08.03.2013	12	5	4	3	Left after play-offs semifinals.
(Turkey)	Hakan Kutlu	16.05.2014 – 31.05.2014	1	1	0	0	Managed team in play-offs finals.

Note: Only official games were included.

== 2013–14 squad ==
Appearances, goals and cards count for 2013–14 TFF First League and 2013–14 Turkish Cup games. Only the players who appeared in game rosters were included. Kit numbers were allowed to select by players. 18 players appeared in each game roster, three to be replaced. Players are listed in order of appearance.

O	N	Nat	Name	Birth	Born	Pos	LA	LG	CA	CG	TA	TG	Booked	Sent off (straight red)	← Season Notes →
1	91	(Turkey)	Mahmut Bezgin	1 Mar 1986	Gaziantep	GK	15				15		2		2013 ST Gaziantepspor.
2	21	(Turkey)	Ali Tandoğan	25 Dec 1987	Salihli	DF	33	4			33	4	7	1	2013 ST Antalyaspor.
3	69	(Turkey)	Murat Kalkan	20 May 1986	Bayburt	DF	2		1	1	3	1	1		2013 ST Konyaspor.
4	33	(Turkey)	Efe Özarslan	29 Mar 1990	Mersin	DF	34				34		3		2013 ST Bucaspor.
5	15	(Serbia)	Milan Mitrović	2 Jul 1988	Prokuplje	DF	34				34		8		→ previous season.
6	5	(Turkey)	Murat Ceylan	2 Mar 1988	Gaziantep	MF	22				22		7	1	→ previous season.
7	10	(Nigeria)	Raheem Lawal	4 May 1990	Lagos	MF	15	5			15	5	3	1	→ previous season.
8	7	(Turkey)	Güven Varol	2 Jun 1981	Adapazarı	MF	36	11			36	11	3	1	2013 ST Karabükspor.
9	77	(Nigeria)	Nduka Ozokwo	25 Dec 1988	Enugu	MF	31	2			31	2	8	1	→ previous season.
10	9	(Turkey)	Emrah Bozkurt	5 Mar 1980	Ankara	FW	27	4			27	4	1		2013 ST K. Erciyesspor.
11	11	(Turkey)	Kenan Şahin	27 Oct 1984	Cologne	FW	11	1	1		12	1	1		2013 ST K. Erciyesspor.
12	14	(Turkey)	Behram Zülaloğlu	30 Aug 1982	Tokat	GK	5		1		6				2013 ST Körfez FK.
13	28	(Turkey)	Eren Tozlu	27 Dec 1990	Giresun	FW	22	1	1		23	1	4		→ previous season.
14	20	(Turkey)	Veli Acar	30 Aug 1981	Denizli	MF	28	1	1		29	1	2		2013 ST Denizlispor.
15	6	(Turkey)	Burak Can Kalender	24 Jun 1995	Seyhan	MF	1				1				→ previous season.
16	4	(Turkey)	Ömer Kulga	8 Jan 1989	Sint-Niklaas	DF	3		1		4		1		2013 ST Orduspor.
17	72	(Turkey)	Nurullah Kaya	20 Jul 1986	Batman	MF	33	1	1		34	1	6		→ previous season.
18	8	(Turkey)	Mahmut Temür	8 Oct 1989	Cologne	MF	26	6			26	6	2	1	2013 ST FC 08 Homburg.
19	17	(Turkey)	Adem Güven	11 Sep 1985	Kulu	FW	10	2	1		11	2	1		2013 ST Odds BK.
20	3	(Turkey)	Anıl Karaer	4 Jul 1988	Şişli	DF	34	5			34	5	5	1	2013 SL Karabükspor.
21	58	(Turkey)	Mehmet Yıldız	14 Sep 1981	Yozgat	FW	30	10			30	10	9		→ previous season.
22	93	(Turkey)	Abdulkadir Korkut	7 Nov 1993	Mersin	DF	2		1		3				→ previous season.
23	13	(Tunisia)	Wissem Ben Yahia	9 Sep 1984	Tunis	MF	26	3	1		27	3	9		→ previous season.
24	50	(Turkey)	Mahmut Metin	12 Jul 1994	Besni	MF			1		1				→ previous season.
25	90	(Turkey)	Muammer Yıldırım	14 Sep 1990	Eğil	GK	1				1				2013 ST B. Vanspor.
26	23	(Turkey)	Coşkun Kayhan	24 Aug 1986	Yozgat	MF	1				1				2013 ST 1. SC Sollenau.
27	94	(Turkey)	Yusuf Türkmen	7 Feb 1994	İslahiye	MF									→ previous season.
28	78	(Turkey)	Ahmet Şahin	22 Mar 1978	Istanbul	GK	20				20				2014 WT Balıkesirspor.
29	87	(Turkey)	Serkan Yanık	2 Apr 1987	Troyes	DF	2				2				2014 WT Gençlerbirliği.
30	99	(Turkey)	Cem Sultan	27 Feb 1991	Bahçelievler	FW	11	2			11	2	2		2014 WT Kayserispor.
31	16	(Turkey)	Gökhan Erdoğan	4 Apr 1991	Beypazarı	MF	2				2				2014 WL Ankaragücü.
32	42	(Turkey)	Berkan Afşarlı	1 Mar 1991	Lindau	MF	7	1			7	1	2	1	2014 WT FC Wil 1900.
33	62	(Turkey)	Sinan Kaloğlu	10 Jun 1981	Tunceli	FW	10				10		1		2014 WT K. Erciyesspor.
34	88	(Kazakhstan)	Ivan Perić	5 May 1982	Pristina	FW	4				4		2		2014 WT FC Zhetysu.
35	27	(Turkey)	Oğuzhan Biçer	17 Apr 1994	Yenimahalle	MF	1				1				2014 WT Ankaragücü.

Sources: TFF club page and maçkolik team page.

== U-21 team ==
Mersin İdmanyurdu U-21 team had participated in 2013–14 U-21 League. League was played in three stages. In the first stage, 61 teams played ranking group games in 8 groups on regional basis. 5 consisted of 8 and 3 consisted of 7 teams. In the second stage winners of each group consisted final group while the rest played classification group games. In the third stage, winners of classification groups played elimination matches and winners played quarterfinals with first four placed teams in final group. Mersin İdmanyurdu U-21 team took place in Ranking Group 5 and finished 3rd in the first stage. In the second stage the team took place in Classification Group 5 and finished 3rd with 7 wins, 6 deuces and 9 losses.

== See also ==
- Football in Turkey
