= 2013–14 TFF 1. Lig =

51st season of second-tier football league in Turkey

1. Lig
- Season: 2013–14
- Champions: İstanbul B.B.
- Relegated: Fethiyespor; 1461 Trabzon; TKİ Tavşanlı Linyitspor; Kahramanmaraşspor

The 2013–14 TFF 1. Lig (referred to as the PTT 1. Lig for sponsorship reasons) is the 13th season since the league was established in 2001 and 51st season of the second-level football league of Turkey since its establishment in 1963–64.

== Teams ==
Orduspor, Mersin İdman Yurdu and İstanbul B.B. relegated from Süper Lig. Kayseri Erciyesspor, Çaykur Rizespor and Konyaspor promoted to 2013–14 Süper Lig.

Kahramanmaraşspor, Balıkesirspor and Fethiyespor promoted from TFF 2. Lig. Göztepe, Kartalspor and Ankaragücü relegated to 2013–14 TFF 2. Lig.

== Foreign players ==
Club	Player 1	Player 2	Player 3	Player 4	Player 5	Former Players
1461 Trabzon	(Ghana) Shaibu Yakubu	(Ghana) Torric Jebrin				
Adanaspor	(Brazil) Tiago Bezerra	(Nigeria) Uche Kalu	(Serbia) Marko Vučetić			(Brazil) Fabiano Oliveira
Adana Demirspor	(Brazil) Juninho	(Cameroon) Dorge Kouemaha	(Poland) Mariusz Pawełek			(Czech Republic) Jan Rajnoch
Ankaraspor	(Algeria) Sofiane Hanni	(Liberia) Tonia Tisdell	(Republic of the Congo) Lys Mouithys			(Argentina) Santiago Vizio (Cameroon) Christian Pouga
Balıkesirspor	(Ghana) Kwame Karikari	(Ghana) Richard Kingson	(Sierra Leone) Khalifa Jabbie	(Togo) Lalawélé Atakora		
Boluspor	(Bulgaria) Daniel Zlatkov	(Bulgaria) Nikolay Dimitrov	(Liberia) Jimmy Dixon			
Bucaspor	(Brazil) Luiz Henrique	(Canada) Tam Nsaliwa	(Canada) Tosaint Ricketts			
Denizlispor	(Azerbaijan) Sasha Yunisoglu	(Brazil) Kahê	(Bulgaria) Iliyan Yordanov	(Czech Republic) Petr Janda	(Kyrgyzstan) Mirlan Murzayev	(Azerbaijan) Arif İsayev (Croatia) Dajan Šimac (France) Bruce Inkango (Kazakhstan) Vladimir Sedelnikov (North Macedonia) Bajram Fetai
Fethiyespor	(Azerbaijan) Davud Karimi	(Cameroon) Patrick Etoga	(Cameroon) Sammy Ndjock	(Croatia) Nikola Žižić	(Kosovo) Liridon Krasniqi	
Gaziantep B.B.	(Cameroon) Armand Deumi	(Nigeria) Izu Azuka				(Ivory Coast) Konan Oussou (Switzerland) Roman Güntensperger
İstanbul B.B.	(Bosnia and Herzegovina) Edin Višća	(Brazil) Doka Madureira	(Sierra Leone) Mohamed Bangura			(Brazil) Tom (Nigeria) Simon Zenke (Portugal) Geraldes
Kahramanmaraşspor	(Benin) Razak Omotoyossi	(Bosnia and Herzegovina) Branko Grahovac	(Montenegro) Đorđije Ćetković	(Nigeria) Ganiyu Oseni	(Senegal) Moustapha Dabo	(Azerbaijan) Farid Guliyev (Nigeria) Izu Azuka
Karşıyaka	(Czech Republic) David Bičík	(Netherlands) Sjoerd Ars	(Nigeria) Chikeluba Ofoedu			
Manisaspor	(Austria) Benjamin Fuchs	(Serbia) Goran Čaušić	(Serbia) Nikola Mikić	(Serbia) Slavko Perović	(Slovakia) Arnold Šimonek	
Mersin İdman Yurdu	(Nigeria) Nduka Ozokwo	(Serbia) Ivan Perić	(Serbia) Milan Mitrović	(Tunisia) Wissem Ben Yahia		(Nigeria) Raheem Lawal
Orduspor	(Azerbaijan) Branimir Subašić	(Guinea) Guy-Michel Landel	(Ivory Coast) Bakary Soro	(Romania) Alexandru Ioniță		(Belarus) Valery Fomichev
Samsunspor	(Bosnia and Herzegovina) Eldin Adilović	(Nigeria) Aminu Umar	(Nigeria) Ekigho Ehiosun			
Şanlıurfaspor	(Ghana) Emmanuel Banahene	(Nigeria) Simon Zenke	(Sierra Leone) Alfred Sankoh	(Uzbekistan) Dilshod Rakhmatullaev	(Sweden) Mattias Mete	(Greece) Georgios Fotakis
TKİ Tavşanlı Linyitspor	(Kyrgyzstan) Vadim Kharchenko	(Nigeria) Akeem Agbetu				(Azerbaijan) Andrey Popovich (Azerbaijan) Nduka Usim (Nigeria) Dele Olorundare (Nigeria) Gideon Sani

== League table ==
Pos	Team	Pld	W	D	L	GF	GA	GD	Pts	Qualification or relegation
1	İstanbul B.B. (C, P)	36	24	6	6	76	38	+38	78	Promotion to Süper Lig
2	Balıkesirspor (P)	36	22	7	7	56	33	+23	73	Promotion to Süper Lig
3	Orduspor	36	21	8	7	57	30	+27	71	Qualification for Promotion Playoffs
4	Ankaraspor	36	18	12	6	61	35	+26	66	Qualification for Promotion Playoffs
5	Samsunspor	36	17	14	5	61	36	+25	65	Qualification for Promotion Playoffs
6	Mersin İdmanyurdu (O, P)	36	16	12	8	56	43	+13	60	Qualification for Promotion Playoffs
7	Manisaspor	36	16	6	14	55	47	+8	54	
8	Karşıyaka	36	13	10	13	51	49	+2	49	
9	Bucaspor	36	14	4	18	47	59	−12	46	
10	Denizlispor	36	14	4	18	42	56	−14	46	
11	Şanlıurfaspor	36	12	9	15	46	49	−3	45	
12	Adanaspor	36	11	10	15	51	55	−4	43	
13	Adana Demirspor	36	11	10	15	58	63	−5	43	
14	Gaziantep B.B.	36	10	11	15	30	47	−17	41	
15	Boluspor	36	10	10	16	34	47	−13	40	
16	Fethiyespor (R)	36	10	8	18	47	59	−12	38	Relegation to TFF 2. Lig
17	1461 Trabzon (R)	36	7	14	15	49	58	−9	35	Relegation to TFF 2. Lig
18	TKİ Tavşanlı Linyitspor (R)	36	9	7	20	39	67	−28	34	Relegation to TFF 2. Lig
19	Kahramanmaraşspor A.Ş. (R)	36	2	8	26	31	76	−45	14	Relegation to TFF 2. Lig

Source: tff.org
Rules for classification: 1) points; 2) goal difference; 3) number of goals scored.
(C) Champions; (O) Play-off winners; (P) Promoted; (R) Relegated

== Results ==
Home \ Away	1TR	ADA	ADS	ANK	BAL	BOL	BUC	DEN	FET	GBB	İBB	KAH	KSK	MAN	MİY	ORD	SAM	ŞAN	TAV
1461 Trabzon		0–0	1–1	0–0	1–2	3–3	2–3	5–1	3–2	1–1	2–3	1–1	1–1	1–3	2–2	1–1	1–1	3–4	4–0
Adanaspor	3–3		2–2	1–1	2–3	1–0	2–3	1–3	1–1	3–0	4–0	3–1	1–2	1–2	3–1	0–4	1–1	0–2	3–0
Adana Demirspor	2–1	1–3		2–3	0–1	2–1	5–4	3–2	3–1	4–1	1–3	3–0	1–1	2–2	1–1	3–2	3–3	2–2	3–0
Ankaraspor	3–1	3–1	3–0		3–1	1–3	1–0	2–1	2–1	0–1	1–1	2–0	0–1	3–1	3–1	4–0	0–0	0–2	2–0
Balıkesirspor	4–0	2–1	1–0	1–1		1–0	2–0	3–0	1–1	1–0	2–1	3–1	4–1	1–0	1–1	2–2	2–2	1–2	1–0
Boluspor	0–0	1–1	1–0	2–3	0–1		1–0	1–0	1–1	0–0	0–4	1–0	1–4	0–1	1–2	1–2	1–0	0–0	2–0
Bucaspor	0–2	1–3	1–0	1–2	0–2	2–0		1–0	1–0	2–1	1–2	2–1	1–0	1–1	2–2	2–1	1–1	0–1	1–2
Denizlispor	2–0	0–0	3–1	0–4	1–0	0–2	0–4		1–5	1–1	1–1	2–1	2–3	0–1	2–0	0–1	2–2	3–1	3–0
Fethiyespor	4–0	0–1	2–1	3–1	0–4	2–0	4–0	1–4		1–1	0–2	2–2	0–3	0–1	0–1	2–2	0–0	1–3	2–2
Gaziantep B.B.	0–0	1–1	1–2	3–3	2–1	1–1	1–2	1–0	0–2		0–4	2–1	1–1	0–1	0–1	0–3	0–1	0–1	2–1
İstanbul B.B.	2–1	3–1	4–0	0–0	0–0	4–1	2–1	1–0	1–0	4–0		3–0	4–2	4–3	2–3	0–1	1–3	2–1	3–1
Kahramanmaraşspor	3–2	2–3	1–4	1–1	1–2	0–0	2–4	0–2	1–3	0–2	1–3		1–4	0–1	0–2	2–3	1–1	0–2	4–1
Karşıyaka	2–0	1–0	0–0	1–1	3–1	2–2	2–3	0–1	1–2	1–2	1–3	0–0		3–2	0–0	0–1	1–2	1–0	1–1
Manisaspor	2–1	1–0	1–1	0–1	3–0	0–1	2–0	1–2	5–1	0–0	2–1	2–0	2–3		3–2	1–2	3–4	0–0	2–4
Mersin İdman Yurdu	0–1	3–0	2–0	1–1	0–1	0–0	3–1	0–1	3–1	0–0	2–2	4–1	3–0	1–0		1–0	5–4	1–1	2–0
Orduspor	1–1	2–0	3–1	3–1	0–1	1–0	1–1	3–0	3–0	0–1	0–1	0–0	2–1	2–0	0–0		0–0	2–0	3–0
Samsunspor	1–0	3–1	2–2	1–1	3–0	2–0	2–0	2–0	2–0	2–1	0–1	4–1	0–1	2–1	3–3	0–1		3–1	1–0
Şanlıurfaspor	0–1	0–1	2–1	0–4	1–1	3–4	4–1	3–0	0–1	0–1	1–1	1–0	2–2	0–2	2–3	3–4	0–0		1–1
TKİ Tavşanlı Linyitspor	0–3	2–2	2–1	0–0	0–2	3–2	2–0	1–2	2–1	1–2	1–3	1–1	2–1	3–3	4–0	0–1	0–3	2–0	

Source: TFF
Legend: Blue = home team win; Yellow = draw; Red = away team win.

== Promotion playoffs ==
=== Semifinals ===
Team 1	Agg.	Team 2	1st leg	2nd leg
Samsunspor	2–1	Ankaraspor	1–0	1–1
Mersin İdmanyurdu	3–1	Orduspor	2–1	1–0

==== First legs ====
9 May 2014	Samsunspor	1–0	Ankaraspor	Samsun 19 Mayıs Stadium, Samsun
19:00 CET+3	Yılmazer 79'	(Report)

9 May 2014	Mersin İdmanyurdu	2–1	Orduspor	Mersin Olympic Stadium, Mersin
21:45 CET+3	Yıldız 44'; Ben Yahia 69'	(Report)	Özen 2'

==== Second legs ====
13 May 2014	Orduspor	0–1	Mersin İdmanyurdu	19 Eylül Stadium, Ordu
19:00 CET+3		(Report)	Varol 90+6'

13 May 2014	Ankaraspor	1–1	Samsunspor	Yenikent Asaş Stadium, Ankara
21:45 CET+3	Başdağ 40'	(Report)	Adilović 31'

=== Final ===
18 May 2014	Mersin İdmanyurdu	2–0	Samsunspor	Şükrü Saracoğlu Stadium, Istanbul
17:30 CET+3	Varol 42'; Sultan 87'	(Report)

== Statistics ==
=== Top goalscorers ===
As of 11 May 2014.

Rank	Player	Club	Goals
1	(Serbia) Slavko Perović	Manisaspor	19
1	(Turkey) Muhammet Reis	Balıkesirspor	19
3	(Turkey) Anıl Taşdemir	Orduspor	17
4	(Brazil) Tiago Bezerra	Adanaspor	16
5	(Turkey) Ahmet Aras	Fethiyespor	15
5	(Bosnia and Herzegovina) Eldin Adilović	Samsunspor	15

== See also ==
- 2013–14 Turkish Cup
- 2013–14 Süper Lig
- 2013–14 TFF 2. Lig
- 2013–14 TFF 3. Lig
