= 2014–15 TFF 1. Lig =

52nd season of second-tier football league in Turkey

TFF 1. Lig
- Season: 2014–15
- Promoted: Kayserispor; Osmanlıspor; Antalyaspor
- Relegated: Manisaspor; Bucaspor; Orduspor
- Matches: 306
- Goals: 829 (2.71 per match)
- Biggest home win: Karşıyaka 6-0 Ordu
- Biggest away win: Ordu 0-6 Adana Demirspor
- Highest scoring: Karşıyaka 6-5 Adana Demirspor
- Longest winning run: Altınordu (8 matches)
- Longest unbeaten run: Kayserispor (13 matches)
- Longest winless run: Orduspor (14 matches)
- Longest losing run: Orduspor (14 matches)
- All statistics correct as of 5 June 2015.

The 2014–15 TFF 1. Lig (referred to as the PTT 1. Lig for sponsorship reasons) is the 14th season since the league was established in 2001 and 52nd season of the second-level football league of Turkey since its establishment in 1963–64. Before start of this season Ankaraspor changed her name as Osmanlıspor and her colours as violet-white.

== Teams ==
- Elazığspor, Antalyaspor and Kayserispor relegated from Süper Lig.
- İstanbul B.B., Balıkesirspor and Mersin İ.Y. promoted to 2014–15 Süper Lig.
- Altınordu, Giresunspor and Alanyaspor promoted from TFF 2. Lig.
- Fethiyespor, 1461 Trabzon, Tavşanlı Linyitspor and Kahramanmaraşspor relegated to 2014–15 TFF 2. Lig.

=== Stadia and locations ===
Location of teams in TFF 1. Lig 2014–15

Team	Home city	Stadium	Capacity
Adana Demirspor	Adana	Adana 5 Ocak Stadium	14,805
Adanaspor	Adana	Adana 5 Ocak Stadium	14,805
Alanyaspor	Antalya	Alanya Oba Stadium	15,000
Altınordu	İzmir	Buca Stadium	2,500
Antalyaspor	Antalya	Akdeniz University Stadium	7,083
Boluspor	Bolu	Bolu Atatürk Stadium	8,881
Bucaspor	İzmir	Yeni Buca Stadı	10,500
Denizlispor	Denizli	Denizli Atatürk Stadium	15,420
Elazığspor	Elazığ	Elazığ Atatürk Stadium	13,923
Gaziantep BB	Gaziantep	Kamil Ocak Stadium	16,981
Giresunspor	Giresun	Giresun Atatürk Stadium	12,191
Karşıyaka	İzmir	İzmir Alsancak Stadium	15,358
Kayserispor	Kayseri	Kadir Has Stadium	32,864
Manisaspor	Manisa	Manisa 19 Mayıs Stadium	18,881
Orduspor	Ordu	19 Eylül Stadium	15,000
Osmanlıspor	Ankara	Yenikent Asaş Stadium	20,000
Samsunspor	Samsun	Samsun 19 Mayıs Stadium	16,480
Şanlıurfaspor	Şanlıurfa	Şanlıurfa GAP Stadium	28,965

=== Foreign players ===
Club	Player 1	Player 2	Player 3	Player 4	Player 5	Former Players
Adana Demirspor	(Ghana) Joseph Attamah	(Serbia) Budimir Janošević	(Uruguay) Gustavo Alles			(Zambia) Jacob Mulenga
Adanaspor	(Azerbaijan) Jamshid Maharramov	(Brazil) Tiago Bezerra	(Nigeria) Nduka Ozokwo			(Brazil) João Luiz (Serbia) Marko Vučetić
Alanyaspor	(Czech Republic) Tomáš Borek	(Serbia) Slavko Perović	(Togo) Jonathan Ayité			(Ghana) Yussif Chibsah
Altınordu						
Antalyaspor	(Cameroon) Joseph Boum	(Czech Republic) Petr Janda	(Senegal) Lamine Diarra	(Slovenia) Sašo Fornezzi		
Boluspor	(Azerbaijan) Vagif Javadov	(Brazil) Luiz Henrique	(Cameroon) Marc Mbamba	(Georgia (country)) Giorgi Rekhviashvili	(Serbia) Aleksandar Prijović	
Bucaspor	(Canada) Tam Nsaliwa	(Ghana) Torric Jebrin				(Brazil) Luiz Henrique
Denizlispor	(Azerbaijan) Rail Malikov	(Bulgaria) Iliyan Yordanov	(Bulgaria) Tsvetan Genkov	(Cameroon) Dorge Kouemaha		(Bulgaria) Georgi Andonov
Elazığspor	(Argentina) Franco Cángele	(Azerbaijan) Javid Imamverdiyev	(Belarus) Igor Zenkovich	(Brazil) Bilica	(Mali) Hamidou Traoré	(Croatia) Vanja Iveša
Gaziantep BB	(Brazil) Alanzinho	(Cameroon) Armand Deumi	(Tunisia) Wissem Ben Yahia			(Azerbaijan) Rahman Hajiyev (Azerbaijan) Vagif Javadov (Nigeria) Shola Ameobi
Giresunspor	(Brazil) Jones Carioca	(Nigeria) David Abwo				(Kazakhstan) Anton Chichulin
Karşıyaka	(Azerbaijan) Mahir Shukurov	(Brazil) Juninho	(Brazil) Kahê			(Kazakhstan) David Loriya (Nigeria) Chikeluba Ofoedu
Kayserispor	(Azerbaijan) Kamran Agayev	(Brazil) Bobô	(Montenegro) Marko Simić	(Netherlands) Diego Biseswar	(Portugal) Sereno	(Serbia) Srđan Mijailović
Manisaspor	(Azerbaijan) Branimir Subašić	(Bulgaria) Nikolay Dimitrov	(Serbia) Nikola Mikić	(Uzbekistan) Asror Gafurov		(Serbia) Nenad Milijaš
Orduspor	(Senegal) Souleymane Tandia					(Belarus) Valery Fomichev (Guinea) Guy-Michel Landel (Uganda) Martin Mutumba
Osmanlıspor	(Ivory Coast) Bakary Soro	(Kyrgyzstan) Kayumzhan Sharipov	(Liberia) Tonia Tisdell	(Nigeria) Aminu Umar		(Slovakia) Marek Sapara (Turkmenistan) Wahyt Orazsähedow
Samsunspor	(Bulgaria) Galin Ivanov	(Cameroon) Mbilla Etame	(Nigeria) Chico Ofoedu			(Bosnia and Herzegovina) Eldin Adilović (Nigeria) Aminu Umar
Şanlıurfaspor	(Bosnia and Herzegovina) Eldin Adilović	(Chile) Rodrigo Tello	(Nigeria) Simon Zenke			

== League table ==
Pos	Team	Pld	W	D	L	GF	GA	GD	Pts	Qualification or relegation
1	Kayserispor (C, P)	34	21	9	4	61	24	+37	72	Promotion to Süper Lig
2	Osmanlıspor (P)	34	18	12	4	64	29	+35	66	Promotion to Süper Lig
3	Alanyaspor	34	17	6	11	55	40	+15	57	Qualification for Promotion Playoffs
4	Adana Demirspor	34	16	8	10	57	48	+9	56	Qualification for Promotion Playoffs
5	Antalyaspor (O, P)	34	15	10	9	56	43	+13	55	Qualification for Promotion Playoffs
6	Samsunspor	34	15	13	6	48	30	+18	55 (Note: 3 points deducted)	Qualification for Promotion Playoffs
7	Altınordu A.Ş.	34	15	9	10	60	39	+21	54	
8	Şanlıurfaspor	34	13	13	8	41	29	+12	52	
9	Karşıyaka	34	13	6	15	49	57	−8	45	
10	Boluspor	34	11	11	12	47	40	+7	44	
11	Giresunspor	34	9	17	8	31	36	−5	44	
12	Elazığspor	34	11	9	14	42	45	−3	42	
13	Gaziantep B.B.	34	10	11	13	38	47	−9	41	
14	Adanaspor	34	10	9	15	42	54	−12	39	
15	Denizlispor	34	8	9	17	38	51	−13	33	
16	Manisaspor (R)	34	10	3	21	42	60	−18	33	Relegation to TFF 2. Lig
17	Bucaspor (R)	34	7	11	16	39	67	−28	32	Relegation to TFF 2. Lig
18	Orduspor (R)	34	3	2	29	19	90	−71	11	Relegation to TFF 2. Lig

Source: Türkiye Futbol Federasyonu
Rules for classification: 1) points; 2) goal difference; 3) number of goals scored.
(C) Champions; (O) Play-off winners; (P) Promoted; (R) Relegated

== Results ==
Home \ Away	ADS	ADA	ALA	ATO	ANT	BOL	BUC	DEN	ELA	GBB	GRS	KSK	KAY	MAN	ORD	OSM	SAM	ŞAN
Adana Demirspor		1–0	3–1	0–5	1–1	1–0	2–0	1–1	2–1	3–3	1–1	2–1	1–2	1–1	1–0	1–0	0–0	1–0
Adanaspor	2–1		3–0	0–3	1–4	0–2	0–1	2–0	4–3	3–2	0–2	3–1	0–0	3–2	2–4	1–1	2–1	1–1
Alanyaspor	1–0	2–3		4–2	0–0	0–3	4–0	1–1	0–2	3–0	1–2	5–1	1–1	3–2	2–0	1–3	1–0	1–1
Altınordu A.Ş.	1–3	3–1	1–1		3–1	1–2	1–0	1–1	3–0	3–0	1–1	0–3	0–2	1–0	3–0	0–1	1–1	1–0
Antalyaspor	1–1	0–1	0–4	2–3		1–1	2–1	2–1	2–1	3–0	1–0	2–2	2–0	1–0	1–2	3–4	3–1	1–0
Boluspor	0–3	3–1	0–3	0–0	0–2		2–2	0–1	0–0	3–1	2–2	0–0	2–2	4–0	3–1	1–2	0–0	0–0
Bucaspor	5–3	2–2	2–3	1–1	0–3	3–2		3–2	3–0	1–1	1–1	0–2	0–3	1–1	2–0	1–1	0–0	0–0
Denizlispor	3–4	2–1	0–1	1–2	0–2	0–3	2–1		1–1	0–0	0–0	2–0	1–3	2–0	5–1	2–2	1–2	1–0
Elazığspor	2–1	0–0	2–0	2–1	3–1	1–0	2–0	2–1		0–1	1–2	1–2	0–3	2–0	3–0	0–3	0–0	1–1
Gaziantep B.B.	1–0	1–1	0–2	3–1	1–0	1–1	0–0	1–2	2–2		1–1	2–0	0–1	0–2	2–0	3–1	0–3	0–1
Giresunspor	0–1	0–0	1–2	1–1	1–1	0–0	1–1	2–0	1–1	0–0		2–0	0–0	2–1	1–0	1–2	0–4	0–0
Karşıyaka	6–5	2–1	1–0	0–5	1–1	0–5	1–0	2–2	2–1	5–2	0–1		2–1	3–0	6–0	1–1	1–2	0–1
Kayserispor	3–3	3–1	2–0	1–0	0–0	3–0	5–1	3–0	1–0	0–0	4–0	2–1		2–1	2–0	3–1	1–1	3–0
Manisaspor	2–0	2–1	0–3	1–6	3–3	1–2	5–0	2–1	1–0	0–2	4–1	0–2	2–1		1–0	0–2	1–3	1–2
Orduspor	0–6	0–0	1–2	2–3	1–4	0–2	1–3	2–1	1–6	0–2	0–3	0–0	0–1	1–6		0–2	1–4	0–5
Osmanlıspor	2–0	2–0	1–2	1–1	2–2	3–1	5–1	0–0	4–0	2–2	4–0	3–1	0–0	3–0	3–0		0–0	0–0
Samsunspor	0–1	1–1	1–0	1–1	2–1	3–2	5–3	2–1	1–1	1–4	0–0	4–0	2–0	1–0	1–0	0–2		0–0
Şanlıurfaspor	2–3	2–1	1–1	2–1	2–3	2–1	4–0	2–0	1–1	2–0	1–1	1–0	2–3	1–0	2–1	1–1	1–1	

Source: Türkiye Futbol Federasyonu
Legend: Blue = home team win; Yellow = draw; Red = away team win.

== Promotion playoffs ==
=== Semifinals ===
Team 1	Agg.	Team 2	1st leg	2nd leg
Samsunspor	9–1	Alanyaspor	5–1	4–0
Antalyaspor	3–2	Adana Demirspor	3–0	0–2

==== First leg ====
28 May 2015	Samsunspor	5–1	Alanyaspor	Samsun 19 Mayıs Stadium
19:00 CET+3	Hasan 24'; Ofoedu 34', 66'; Etame 43', 78'	Report	Timuçin 71'	Attendance: 10.000; Referee: Barış Şimşek

28 May 2015	Antalyaspor	3–0	Adana Demirspor	Akdeniz University Stadium
21:30 CET+3	Sezer 2', 73'; Emrah 55'	Report		Attendance: 5.000; Referee: Hüseyin Göçek

==== Second leg ====
1 June 2015	Alanyaspor	0–4	Samsunspor	Alanya Oba Stadium
21:00 CET+3		Report	Ofoedu 67'; Eren 82'; Recep 84'; Alperen 86'	Attendance: TBD; Referee: Özgür Yankaya

1 June 2015	Adana Demirspor	2–0	Antalyaspor	Adana 5 Ocak Stadium
21:00 CET+3	Abdülkerim 34'; Özgürcan 78'	Report		Attendance: TBD; Referee: Ali Palabıyık

=== Final ===
Team 1	Score	Team 2
Samsunspor	2–2 (1–4 p)	Antalyaspor

5 June 2015	Samsunspor	2–2 (a.e.t.) (1–4 p)	Antalyaspor	Başakşehir Fatih Terim Stadium
20:00 CET+3	Etame 72', 107'	Report	Diarra 29'; Oğuz 101'	Attendance: 14.000; Referee: Halis Özkahya
	Penalties
	Recep (penalty missed); Sezer (penalty missed); Murat (penalty scored)		(penalty scored) Lokman; (penalty scored) Adem; (penalty scored) Emrah; (penalty scored) Ömer

== Attendances ==
Rank	Team	Matches	Total	Average
1	Adana Demirspor	18	107.700	6.335
2	Kayserispor	17	83.765	4.927
3	Samsunspor	18	78.000	4.588
4	Şanlıurfaspor	17	71.515	4.470
5	Osmanlispor	17	63.500	3.735
6	Adanaspor	17	51.550	3.032
7	Giresunspor	17	47.939	2.820
8	Antalyaspor	18	45.850	2.547
9	Boluspor	17	36.750	2.162
10	Alanyaspor	18	29.750	1.750
11	Denizlispor	17	28.400	1.671
12	Karşıyaka	17	28.345	1.667
13	Elazığspor	17	26.600	1.663
14	Bucaspor	17	23.691	1.394
15	Manisaspor	17	22.970	1.351
16	Altınordu	17	18.127	1.066
17	Orduspor	17	11.200	700
18	Gaziantep BB	17	11.398	670

- Updated to games played on 1 June 2015.
- Source:ntvspor

== Statistics ==
=== Top goalscorers ===
As of 12 January 2018.

Rank	Player	Club	Goals
1	(Senegal) Lamine Diarra	Antalyaspor	17
2	(Serbia) Aleksandar Prijović	Boluspor	16
3	(Greece) Athanasios Papazoglou	Kayserispor	16
4	(Cameroon) Mbilla Etame	Samsunspor	15
5	(Brazil) Tiago Queiroz Bezerra	Adanaspor	15
6	(Turkey) İskender Alın	Bucaspor	14
7	(Togo) Jonathan Ayité	Alanyaspor	12
8	(Turkey) Goksu Turkdogan	Altinordu	12
9	(Turkey) Muhammet Reis	Osmanlispor	12
10	(Turkey) Emre Akbaba	Alanyaspor	11

=== Top assists ===
As of July 2014.

Rank	Player	Club	Assists
1	-	-	-
2	-	-	-
3	-	-	-
4	-	-	-
5	-	-	-

== See also ==
- 2014–15 Turkish Cup
- 2014–15 Süper Lig
- 2014–15 TFF 2. Lig
- 2014–15 TFF 3. Lig
