= Cem Sultan (disambiguation) =

Cem Sultan may refer to:

- Cem Sultan, Ottoman prince
- Cem Sultan (footballer), Turkish footballer
- Malkoçoğlu Cem Sultan, a Turkish film
