= Ömer Kulga =

Belgian footballer (born 1989)

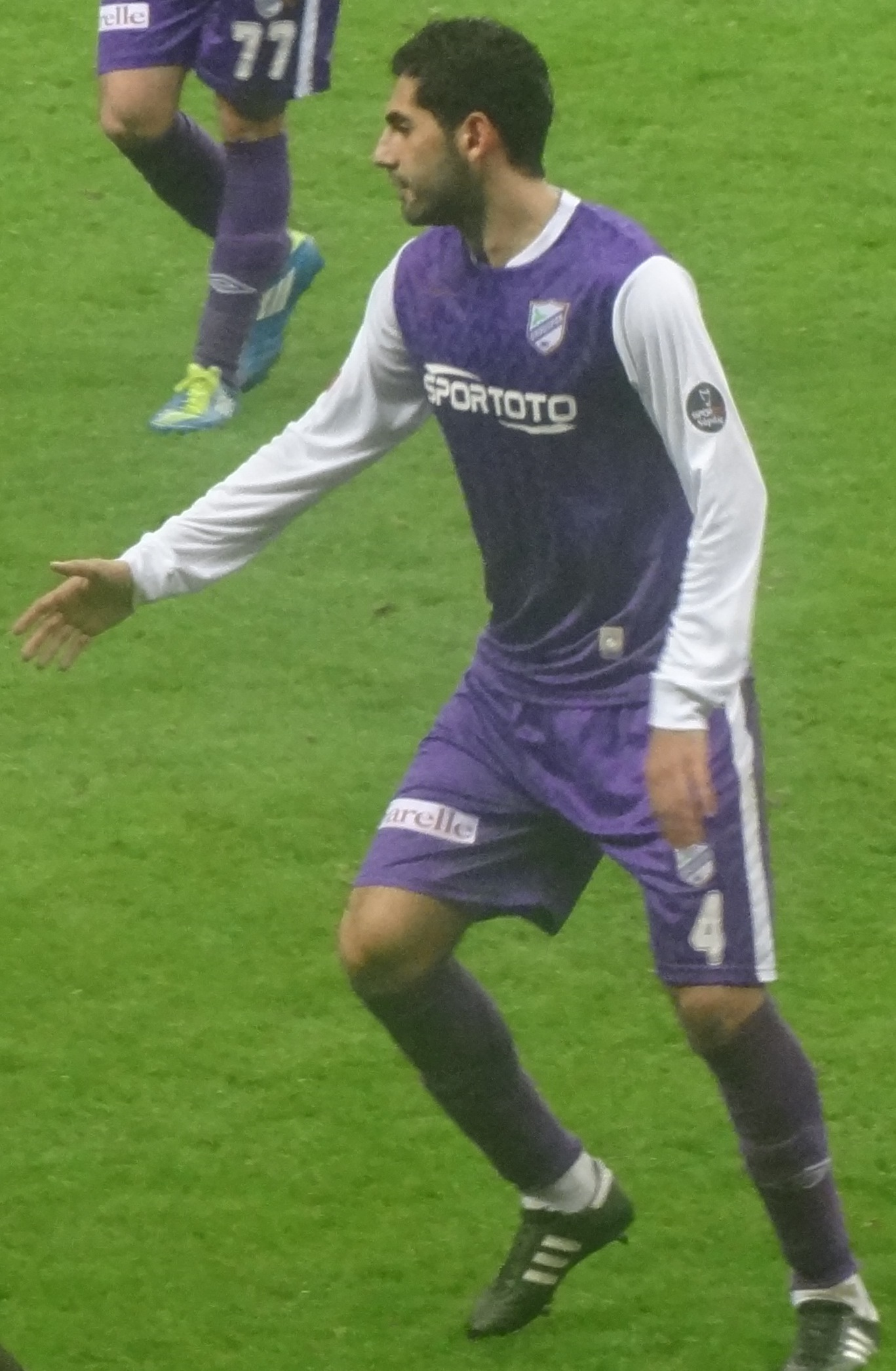

Personal information
- Full name: Ömer Alp Kulga
- Date of birth: 8 January 1989 (age 37)
- Place of birth: Sint-Niklaas, Belgium
- Height: 1.89 m (6 ft 2 in)
- Position: Centre-back

Team information
- Current team: Kuşadasıspor

Youth career
- CS Visé
- MVV Maastricht

Senior career*
Years	Team	Apps	(Gls)
2008–2011	MVV Maastricht	33	(2)
2011–2012	Kayserispor	0	(0)
2012–2013	Orduspor	11	(0)
2013–2014	Mersin İdman Yurdu	3	(0)
2014–2015	Denizlispor	30	(1)
2015	Boluspor	4	(0)
2015–2016	Osmanlıspor	0	(0)
2015	→ Bugsaşspor (loan)	14	(0)
2016–2018	Denizlispor	46	(4)
2018–2019	Manisa BB	3	(0)
2019	Tokatspor	15	(0)
2019	Ergene Velimeşe	9	(1)
2020	Sakaryaspor	2	(0)
2020–2021	Gümüşhanespor	25	(1)
2021–	Kuşadasıspor	31	(2)
- * Club domestic league appearances and goals as of 17:06, 3 September 2022 (UTC)

Ömer Alp Kulga (born 8 January 1989) is a Belgian professional footballer who plays as a centre-back for TFF Third League club Kuşadasıspor.

== Career ==
Born in Sint-Niklaas, Kulga played in the youth department of Belgian side C.S. Visé, before joining with MVV. He was selected to play with the first team in the summer of 2008, and made his debut on 22 August 2008 in a 3–1 win over Helmond Sport. On 24 March 2011, Kulga was told that he would be released by MVV by the end of the season.

Kulga signed a three-year contract with Turkish Süper Lig club Kayserispor on 4 June 2011.
