= Murat Gürbüzerol =

Turkish footballer

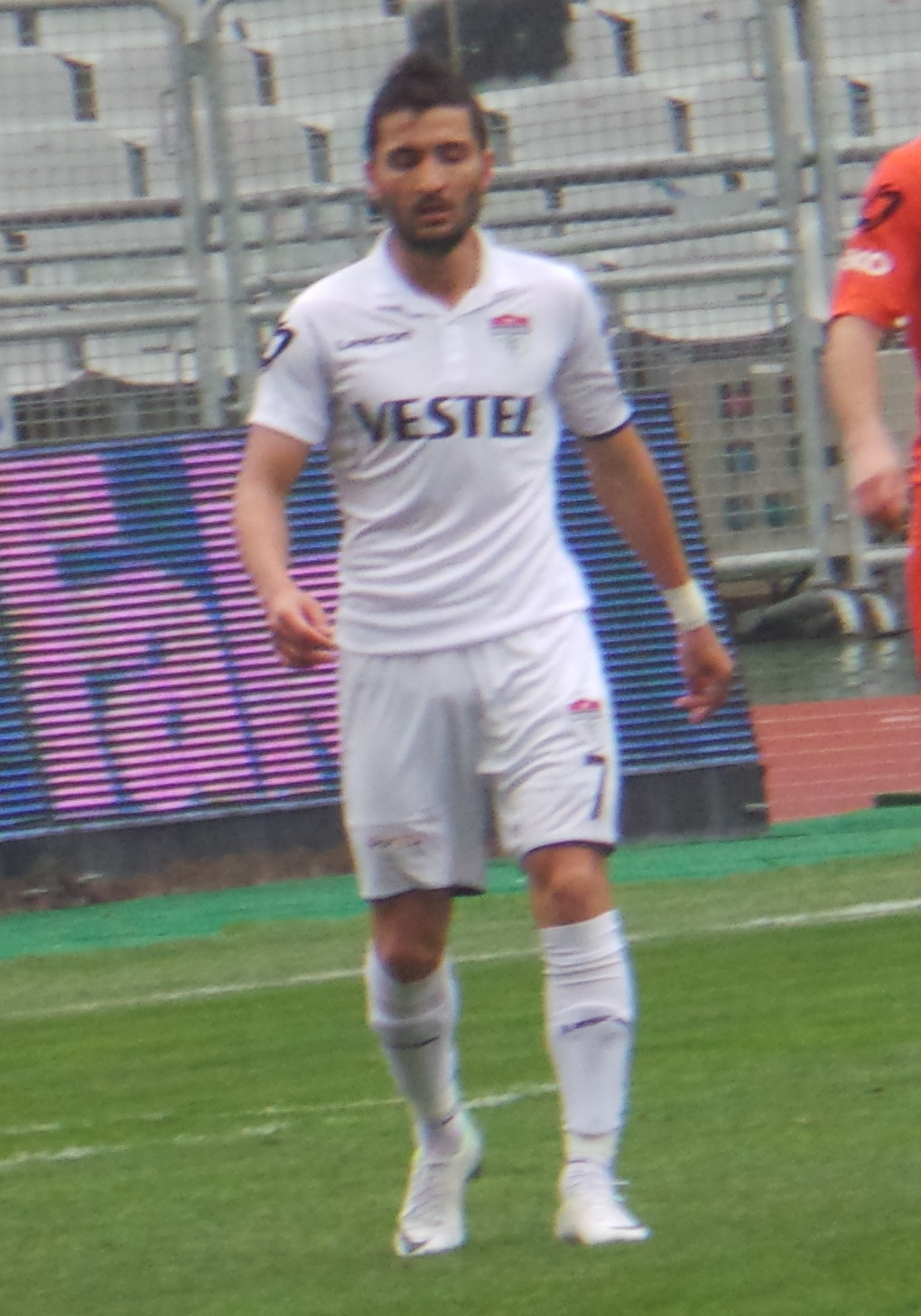
- Murat Gürbüzerol

Personal information
- Date of birth: 1 February 1988 (age 38)
- Place of birth: Söke, Turkey
- Height: 1.80 m (5 ft 11 in)
- Position: Right winger

Team information
- Current team: Kuşadasıspor
- Number: 9

Senior career*
Years	Team	Apps	(Gls)
2006–2014	Manisaspor	80	(36)
2008	→ Eyüpspor (loan)	12	(5)
2009–2010	→ Konya Şekerspor (loan)	28	(14)
2010–2011	→ Akhisar Belediyespor (loan)	31	(5)
2014–2015	Balıkesirspor	2	(0)
2015	Boluspor	17	(1)
2015–2017	Samsunspor	65	(8)
2017–2018	BB Erzurumspor	13	(0)
2018	Giresunspor	10	(0)
2018–2019	Utaş Uşakspor	29	(6)
2019	Sarıyer	10	(0)
2020	Amed SK	11	(1)
2020–2021	Serik Belediyespor	31	(16)
2021–2022	Düzcespor	33	(15)
2022–	Kuşadasıspor	6	(2)
- * Club domestic league appearances and goals as of 30 October 2022

Murat Gürbüzerol (born 1 February 1988) is a Turkish footballer who plays as a right winger for Kuşadasıspor.
