= Zafer Çevik =

Turkish footballer

Personal information
- Date of birth: 20 January 1984 (age 42)
- Place of birth: İzmir, Turkey
- Height: 1.76 m (5 ft 9 in)
- Position: Winger

Team information
- Current team: Ödemişspor

Youth career
- 2001–2004: Fenerbahçe

Senior career*
Years	Team	Apps	(Gls)
2004–2006	Bakırköyspor	42	(6)
2006–2007	Gebzespor	11	(0)
2007–2009	Kartal SK	52	(13)
2009	Denizlispor	2	(0)
2009–2015	Bucaspor	153	(61)
2015	Adana Demirspor	8	(1)
2016	Kayseri Erciyesspor	8	(0)
2016–2018	Bucaspor	33	(9)
2018–2019	Bergama Belediyespor	19	(4)
2020–	Ödemişspor		
- * Club domestic league appearances and goals as of 4 May 2019

Zafer Çevik (born 20 January 1984) is a Turkish professional footballer who plays as a left winger for an amateur side Ödemişspor.

== Career ==
On 31 August 2016, he joined Bucaspor on a two-year contract.
