= Slavko Perović (footballer) =

Serbian footballer

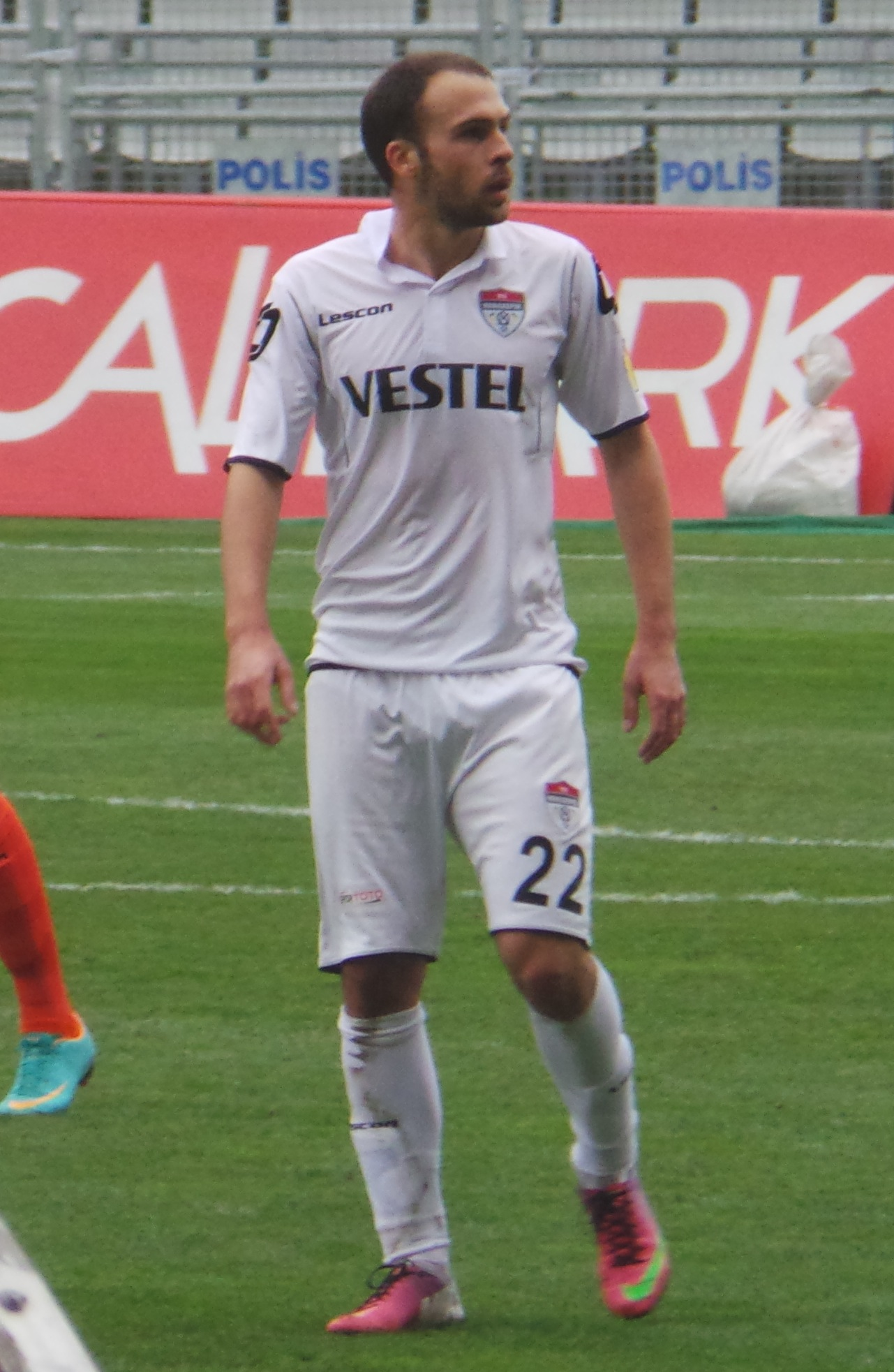
- Perović with Manisaspor in 2014

Personal information
- Date of birth: 9 June 1989 (age 37)
- Place of birth: Kragujevac, SFR Yugoslavia
- Height: 1.86 m (6 ft 1 in)
- Positions: Winger; striker

Youth career
- 2003–2004: Radnički Kragujevac
- 2004–2005: Obilić
- 2006: Red Star Belgrade

Senior career*
Years	Team	Apps	(Gls)
2005–2006	Obilić	1	(0)
2006–2011	Red Star Belgrade	48	(9)
2008	→ Srem (loan)	12	(3)
2009	→ Napredak Kruševac (loan)	14	(4)
2011–2014	Rad	67	(9)
2013–2014	→ Manisaspor (loan)	34	(19)
2015–2016	Alanyaspor	41	(7)
2016	Denizlispor	11	(1)
2017–2018	Manisaspor	39	(9)
2018–2019	İstanbulspor	21	(5)
2019–2020	Dinamo București	17	(6)
Total		305	(72)

International career
2009	Serbia U21	6	(0)
- * Club domestic league appearances and goals as of 7 August 2020

Slavko Perović (Serbian Cyrillic: Славко Перовић; born 9 June 1989) is a Serbian former footballer who played as a forward.

== Career ==
His senior first team debut occurred for FK Obilić towards the end of 2004–05 season, setting the record as youngest player in Serbian football league history - he was only 15 years and 10 months old, breaking Rambo Petković's previous record. That game was played against his former club Red Star Belgrade.

While playing for Manisaspor, Perović became the TFF 1. Lig top scorer in the 2013–14 season with 19 goals.

In 2019, he joined Liga I club Dinamo București. He was released in August 2020.

== Career statistics ==
As of match played 7 August 2020

Club statistics
Club	Season	League			Cup		Other		Total	
Club	Season	Division	Apps	Goals	Apps	Goals	Apps	Goals	Apps	Goals
Red Star Belgrade	2009–10	Serbian SuperLiga	27	7	3	1	6 (Note: Appearances in the UEFA Europa League)	3	36	11
Red Star Belgrade	2010–11	Serbian SuperLiga	12	2	0	0	1	0	13	2
Red Star Belgrade	Total		39	9	3	1	7	3	49	13
Rad	2011–12	Serbian SuperLiga	25	3	1	0	0	0	26	3
Rad	2012–13	Serbian SuperLiga	29	3	3	0	0	0	32	3
Rad	Total		54	6	4	0	0	0	58	6
Manisaspor	2013–14	TFF 1. Lig	34	19	0	0	0	0	34	19
Rad	2014–15	Serbian SuperLiga	13	3	3	1	0	0	16	4
Alanyaspor	2014–15	TFF 1. Lig	15	3	0	0	2 (Note: Appearances in the 2015 Promotion Playoffs)	0	17	3
Alanyaspor	2015–16	TFF 1. Lig	26	4	1	1	3 (Note: Appearances in the 2016 Promotion Playoffs)	0	30	5
Alanyaspor	Total		41	7	1	1	5	0	47	8
Denizlispor	2016–17	TFF 1. Lig	11	1	0	0	0	0	11	1
Manisaspor	2016–17	TFF 1. Lig	14	3	0	0	0	0	14	3
Manisaspor	2017–18	TFF 1. Lig	25	6	3	1	0	0	28	7
Manisaspor	Total		39	9	3	1	0	0	42	10
İstanbulspor	2018–19	TFF 1. Lig	21	5	0	0	0	0	21	5
Dinamo București	2019–20	Liga I	17	6	2	2	0	0	19	8
Career totals			269	65	16	6	12	3	297	74

== Honours ==
Red Star Belgrade

- Serbian Cup: 2009–10
