= Behram Zülaloğlu =

Turkish footballer

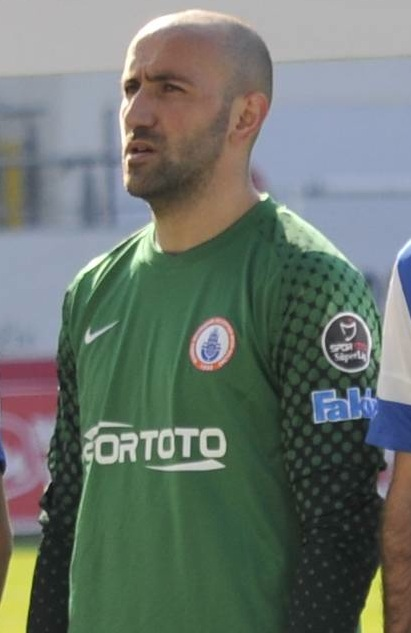

Personal information
- Date of birth: 30 August 1982 (age 44)
- Place of birth: Tokat, Turkey
- Height: 1.85 m (6 ft 1 in)
- Position: Goalkeeper

Team information
- Current team: İstanbul Başakşehir (goalkeeping coach)

Youth career
- 1999–2001: Ankaragücü

Senior career*
Years	Team	Apps	(Gls)
2001–2002	Ankaragücü	0	(0)
2001–2002	→ Kdz. Ereğlispor (loan)	3	(0)
2002–2007	İstanbulspor	24	(0)
2007–2008	Kocaelispor	4	(0)
2008–2012	İstanbul B.B.	13	(0)
2012–2013	Kayseri Erciyesspor	16	(0)
2013	Körfez FK	13	(0)
2013–2014	Mersin IY	5	(0)
2014–2015	Karşıyaka	24	(0)
2015–2016	Tarsus IY	13	(0)
2016–2017	Karşıyaka	8	(0)
2017–2018	Erokspor	6	(0)

Managerial career
- 2019–: İstanbul Başakşehir (GK coach)
- * Club domestic league appearances and goals

Behram Zülaloğlu (born 30 August 1982) is a Turkish professional football coach and a former goalkeeper. He works as a goalkeeping coach for İstanbul Başakşehir.
