= Gökhan Erdoğan =

Turkish footballer

Gökhan
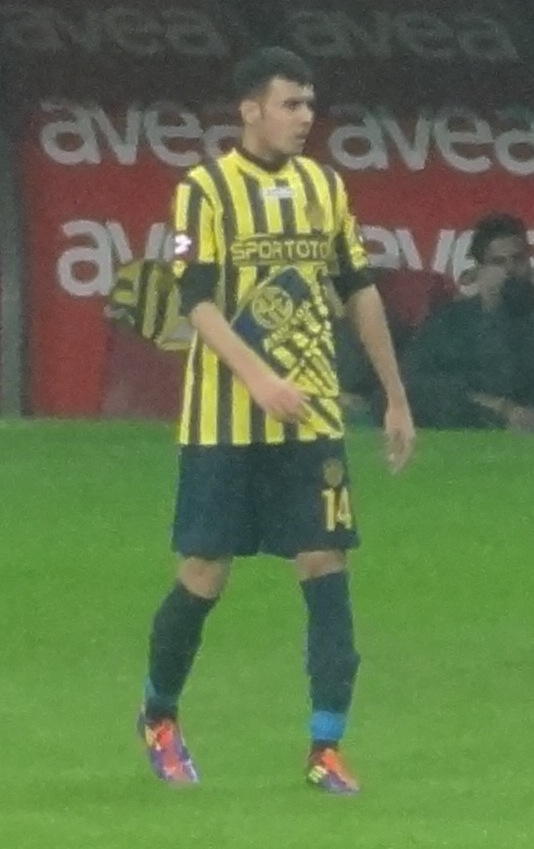

Personal information
- Full name: Gökhan Erdogan
- Date of birth: 4 April 1991 (age 35)
- Place of birth: Ankara, Turkey
- Position: Winger

Team information
- Current team: Darıca Gençlerbirliği
- Number: 11

Youth career
- Beypazari Belediyesi Genclik
- Ankaragücü

Senior career*
Years	Team	Apps	(Gls)
2011–	Ankaragücü	76	(5)
2014	→ Mersin İdmanyurdu (loan)	2	(0)
2015–2016	Nazilli Belediyespor	2	(0)
2016	→ Darıca Gençlerbirliği (loan)	16	(2)
2016–	Darıca Gençlerbirliği	5	(0)
- * Club domestic league appearances and goals as of 26 December 2016

Gökhan Erdogan (born 4 April 1991) is a Turkish professional football player who plays for Darıca Gençlerbirliği.
