= Mahmut Temür =

Turkish footballer (born 1989)

Personal information
- Date of birth: 8 October 1989 (age 37)
- Place of birth: Cologne, West Germany
- Height: 1.76 m (5 ft 9 in)
- Position: Midfielder

Youth career
- –2005: FC Düren-Niederau
- 2005–2008: 1. FC Köln

Senior career*
Years	Team	Apps	(Gls)
2008–2010	1. FC Köln II	48	(8)
2010–2012	Jahn Regensburg	60	(5)
2012–2013	Rot-Weiss Erfurt	5	(0)
2013	FC Homburg	12	(1)
2013–2015	Mersin İdmanyurdu	26	(6)
2015	Gaziantep BB	13	(2)
2015–2016	Adanaspor	13	(2)
2016–2018	Karşıyaka	60	(7)
2018–2019	Alemannia Aachen	20	(1)
2019–2023	SV Eintracht Hohkeppel	64	(55)

International career
2008	Turkey U20	2	(0)

Managerial career
- 2018–2019: 1. FC Düren (assistant)
- * Club domestic league appearances and goals

Mahmut Temür (born 8 October 1989) is a Turkish former professional footballer who played as a midfielder.

== Career ==
He made his debut in the German 3. Liga for SSV Jahn Regensburg on 24 July 2010 in a match against SV Werder Bremen II.
