= Murat Kalkan =

Turkish footballer

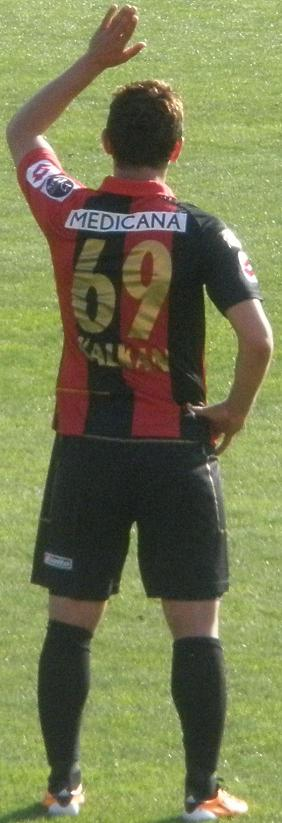

Personal information
- Date of birth: May 20, 1986 (age 40)
- Place of birth: Elazığ, Turkey
- Height: 1.83 m (6 ft 0 in)
- Positions: Centre back; left back

Team information
- Current team: Kastamonuspor

Youth career
- TSG Backnang
- VfB Stuttgart
- 2004–2009: Gençlerbirliği

Senior career*
Years	Team	Apps	(Gls)
2004–2011	Gençlerbirliği	38	(0)
2005–2006	→ Mardinspor (loan)	22	(1)
2006–2009	→ Hacettepe (loan)	79	(1)
2011–2012	Orduspor	11	(0)
2012–2013	Adana Demirspor	14	(0)
2013	Konyaspor	3	(0)
2013–2014	Mersin İdmanyurdu	2	(0)
2014	Çankırıspor	15	(2)
2014–2017	Elazığspor	78	(3)
2017–	Kastamonuspor	0	(0)

International career
2007	Turkey U21	3	(0)
- * Club domestic league appearances and goals as of 9 September 2017

Murat Kalkan (born 20 May 1986 in Bayburt, Turkey) is a Turkish footballer. He currently plays as a left wingback for Kastamonuspor.
