= Mahmut Bezgin =

Turkish footballer (born 1986)

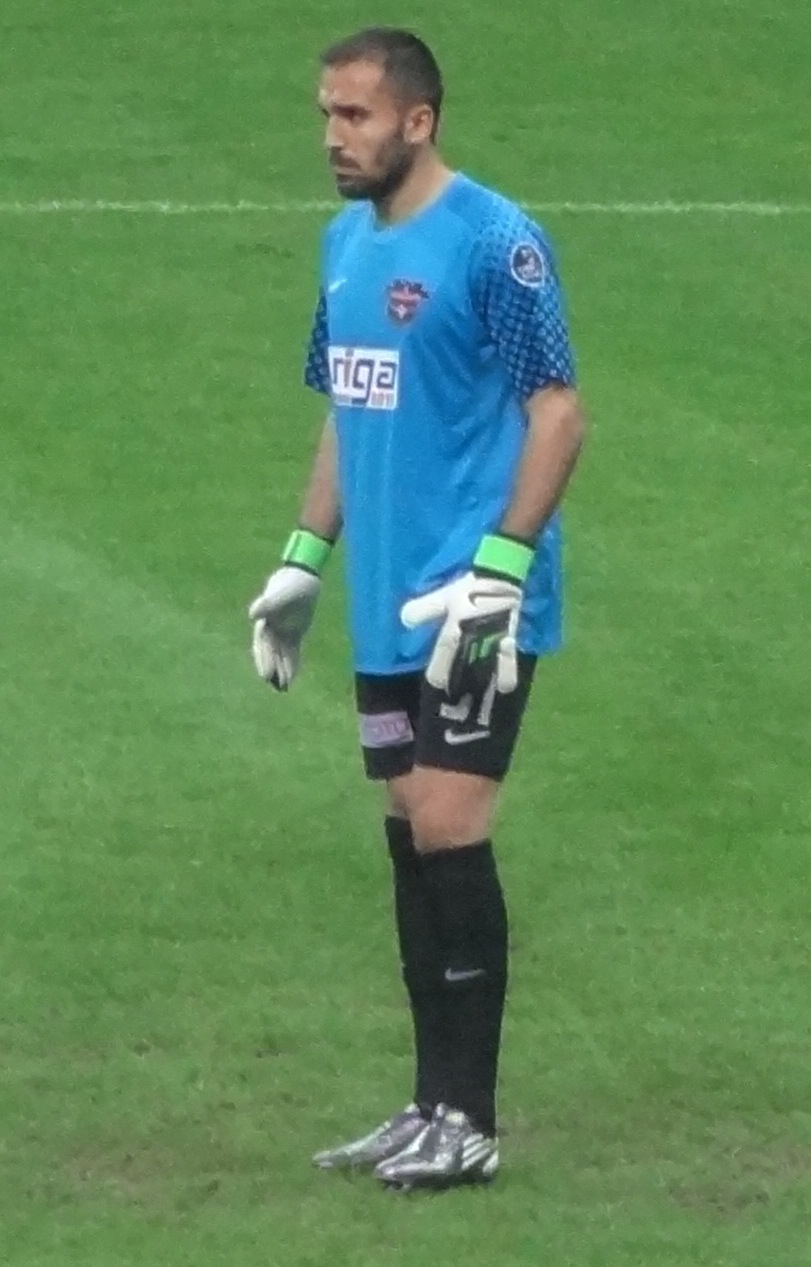
- Mahmut Bezgin in 2012

Personal information
- Full name: Mahmut Bezgin
- Date of birth: March 1, 1986 (age 40)
- Place of birth: Gaziantep, Turkey
- Height: 1.86 m (6 ft 1 in)
- Position: Goalkeeper

Team information
- Current team: Sivasspor
- Number: 27

Senior career*
Years	Team	Apps	(Gls)
2006–2013	Gaziantepspor	47	(0)
2013–	Mersin İdmanyurdu		
2014–	Sivasspor		
- * Club domestic league appearances and goals as of 22 May 2013

Mahmut Bezgin (born March 1, 1986, in Gaziantep, Turkey) is a Turkish footballer, who is currently playing for Turkish side Sivasspor. He is 1.86 m (6 ft 1 in) tall and weighs 80 kg (180 lb; 13 st).
