= İrfan Başaran =

Turkish footballer

Personal information
- Date of birth: 20 December 1989 (age 36)
- Place of birth: Adana, Turkey
- Height: 1.65 m (5 ft 5 in)
- Position: Midfielder

Team information
- Current team: 52 Orduspor
- Number: 10

Youth career
- Marmaris Spor
- 2002–2007: Galatasaray

Senior career*
| Years | Team | Apps | (Gls) |
| 2007–2009 | Galatasaray | 1 | (0) |
| 2008–2009 | → Beylerbeyi (loan) | 19 | (1) |
| 2009–2013 | Orduspor | 44 | (4) |
| 2012 | → Adana Demirspor (loan) | 14 | (1) |
| 2013 | → Bucaspor (loan) | 13 | (1) |
| 2013–2014 | Kahramanmaraşspor | 12 | (0) |
| 2014 | Fethiyespor | 15 | (3) |
| 2014–2017 | Yeni Malatyaspor | 79 | (18) |
| 2017–2018 | Boluspor | 26 | (2) |
| 2018–2019 | Samsunspor | 15 | (1) |
| 2019–2020 | Bandırmaspor | 20 | (1) |
| 2020–2021 | Kocaelispor | 14 | (1) |
| 2021–2023 | İskenderunspor | 41 | (3) |
| 2023– | 52 Orduspor | 14 | (0) |

International career
| 2004 | Turkey U16 | 3 | (1) |
| 2005–2006 | Turkey U17 | 12 | (1) |
| 2006 | Turkey U18 | 6 | (0) |
- * Club domestic league appearances and goals as of 23 September 2023

İrfan Başaran (born 20 December 1989) is a Turkish footballer who plays as a midfielder for 52 Orduspor.

İrfan is a product of the Galatasaray Youth Team.
