= Anıl Karaer =

Turkish footballer

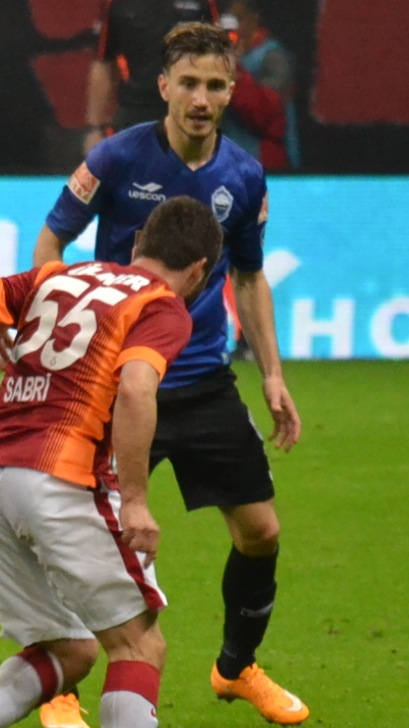
- 2015

Personal information
- Date of birth: July 4, 1988 (age 38)
- Place of birth: Istanbul, Turkey
- Height: 1.78 m (5 ft 10 in)
- Position: Defender

Youth career
- 2005–2007: Galatasaray

Senior career*
Years	Team	Apps	(Gls)
2007–2009	Galatasaray	0	(0)
2007	→ Manisaspor (loan)	1	(0)
2007–2008	→ Rizespor (loan)	10	(0)
2008–2009	→ Ankaragücü (loan)	1	(0)
2009–2011	Adanaspor	77	(4)
2012–2014	Karabükspor	12	(0)
2013–2014	→ Mersin Idmanyurdu (loan)	34	(5)
2014–2015	Erciyesspor	30	(2)
2015–2016	Eskişehirspor	18	(0)
2016–2017	Kayserispor	14	(0)
2017	Gençlerbirliği	13	(0)
2017–2019	Osmanlıspor	48	(1)
2019–2020	Bursaspor	27	(1)
2020–2021	Adana Demirspor	6	(1)
2021–2022	Tuzlaspor	7	(1)

International career
2004	Turkey U17	1	(0)
2007	Turkey U19	9	(0)
- * Club domestic league appearances and goals as of 13 April 2021

Anıl Karaer (born 4 July 1988) is a Turkish footballer who plays as defender. He has been trained by the Galatasaray youth department.

On 24 June 2009, he signed a two-year contract with Adanaspor.
