= Oğuzhan Biçer =

Turkish footballer

Personal information
- Date of birth: 17 April 1994 (age 32)
- Place of birth: Yenimahalle, Turkey
- Position: Midfielder

Team information
- Current team: Ankara Demirspor
- Number: 20

Youth career
- 2004–2012: Ankaragücü

Senior career*
Years	Team	Apps	(Gls)
2012–2014	Ankaragücü	3	(0)
2014	Mersin İdman Yurdu	1	(0)
2014–2015	Yeşil Bursa SK	12	(0)
2015–2016	İstanbulspor	9	(0)
2016–	Ankara Demirspor	3	(0)
- * Club domestic league appearances and goals as of 5 August 2015

Oğuzhan Biçer (born 17 April 1994) is a Turkish professional footballer who plays as a midfielder for Ankara Demirspor. He made his Süper Lig debut on 18 February 2012.
