= Aytaç Ak =

Turkish footballer (born 1985)

Personal information
- Date of birth: 22 April 1985 (age 41)
- Place of birth: Adapazarı, Turkey
- Height: 1.88 m (6 ft 2 in)
- Position: Centre-back

Senior career*
Years	Team	Apps	(Gls)
2003–2005	Sakaryaspor	11	(1)
2005–2006	Malatyaspor	4	(0)
2006–2007	Ankaragücü	0	(0)
2007	→ Etimesgut Şekerspor (loan)	3	(0)
2007–2009	Sivasspor	15	(0)
2008–2009	→ Diyarbakırspor (loan)	4	(0)
2010–2011	Sakaryaspor	24	(2)
2011	Tarsus İdman Yurdu	10	(0)
2011–2016	1461 Trabzon	106	(5)
2016–2017	Sakaryaspor	17	(2)
2017–2018	Adapazarı Spor		

International career
2005	Turkey U20	5	(0)
- * Club domestic league appearances and goals

Aytaç Ak (born 22 April 1985) is a Turkish former professional footballer who played as a centre-back.
