= Roman Güntensperger =

Swiss footballer (born 1991)

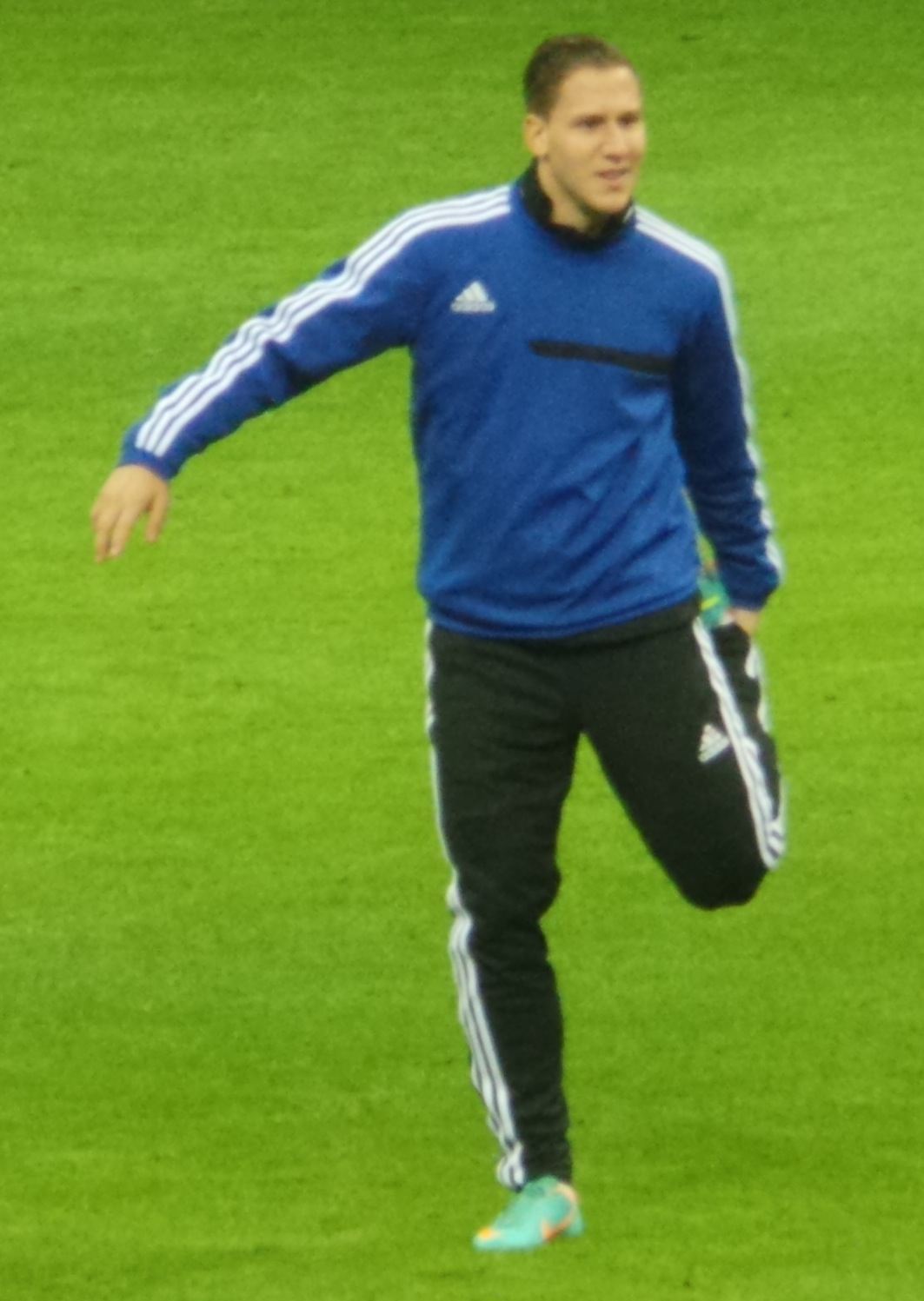

Personal information
- Date of birth: 18 January 1991 (age 35)
- Place of birth: Lachen, Switzerland
- Height: 1.77 m (5 ft 9 1/2 in)
- Position: Defender

Team information
- Current team: Bellinzona
- Number: 3

Senior career*
Years	Team	Apps	(Gls)
2009–2010	Zürich	0	(0)
2010–2011	St. Gallen	0	(0)
2011–2012	Kriens	22	(0)
2012–2013	Bellinzona	24	(0)
2013–2014	Gaziantep	5	(2)
2014–2015	FC Tuggen	22	(3)
2015–	FC Rapperswil-Jona	24	(1)
- * Club domestic league appearances and goals as of 20 May 2017

Roman Güntensperger (born 18 January 1991) is a Swiss footballer who plays for Bellinzona in the Swiss Super League.

== Career ==
Güntensperger began playing for Zürich and St. Gallen at under-21 level. He played in the Challenge League with Kriens and Bellinzona before a brief spell with Gaziantep B.B. He currently plays at FC Rapperswil-Jona in the Swiss Challenge League.

== Family ==
Güntensperger is the son of Erich Güntensperger.

== Net Worth ==
Gütensperger's net worth is about $1 million-$7 million just by playing soccer alone.
