= Veli Acar =

Turkish footballer (born 1981)

Personal information
- Date of birth: 30 August 1981 (age 45)
- Place of birth: Kelekçi, Denizli, Turkey
- Height: 1.75 m (5 ft 9 in)
- Position: Wingback

Youth career
- 1998–1999: Karşıyakaspor
- 1999–2000: Denizli Telekomspor
- 2000–2001: Acipayam Merkezspor
- 2001–2002: Pamukkale Üniversitesi G.S.K.

Senior career*
Years	Team	Apps	(Gls)
2002–2005	Denizli Belediyespor	90	(20)
2005–2010	Bursaspor	115	(2)
2010–2011	Konyaspor	19	(0)
2011–2013	Denizlispor	61	(3)
2013–2014	Mersin İdmanyurdu	30	(1)
2014–2018	Denizlispor	88	(3)
- * Club domestic league appearances and goals

Veli Acar (born 30 August 1981) is a Turkish former professional footballer who played as a wingback.

== Club career ==
Acar began his career in the amateur leagues with local club Karşıyakaspor. He played for several other Denizli-based clubs, including Denizli Telekomspor, Acipayam Merkezspor, and Pamukkale Üniversitesi G.S.K., before signing for Bursaspor in 2005. When he first signed with the club, they were competing in the TFF First League. Bursaspor earned promotion at the end of the season, with Acar making eleven appearances. His career with the club culminated with a Süper Lig title at the end of the 2009–10 season, the first in club history. Konyaspor signed him on 13 August 2010.

== Honours ==
- Bursaspor
  - Süper Lig (1): 2009–10
