= Mehmet Eren Boyraz =

Turkish football attacking midfielder

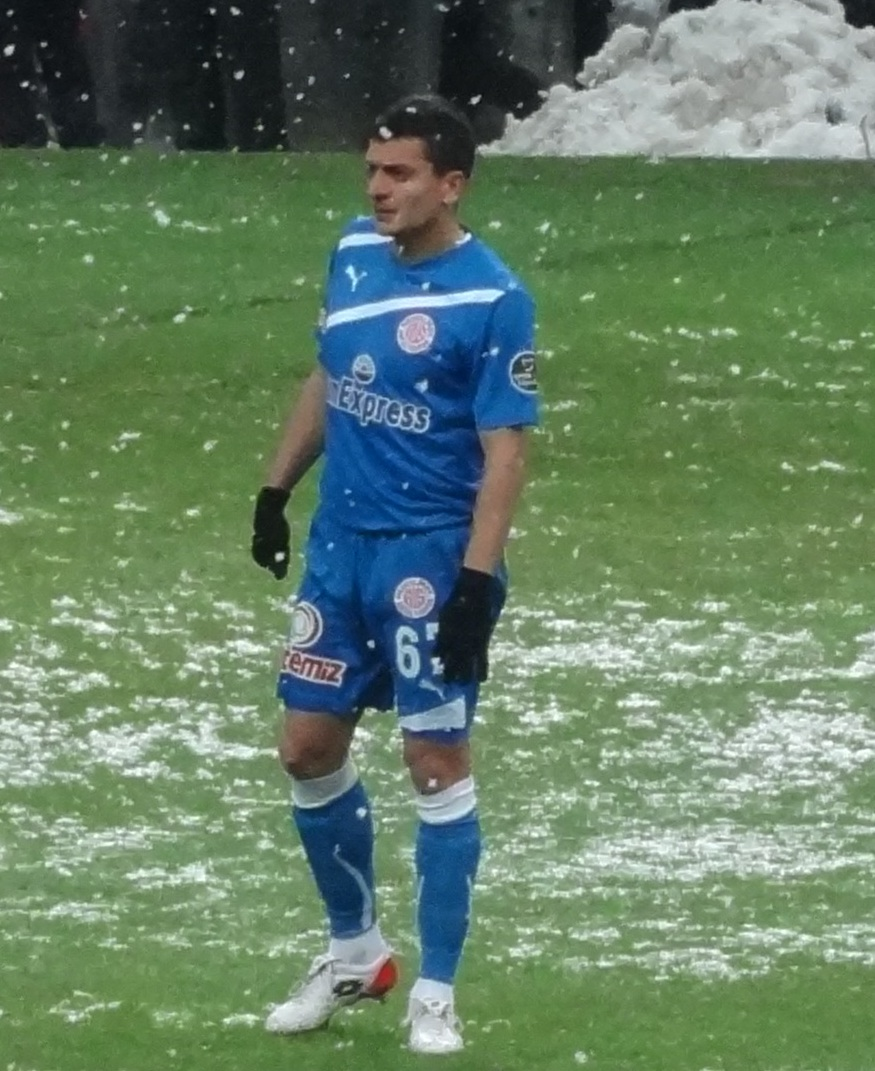

Personal information
- Date of birth: 11 October 1981 (age 45)
- Place of birth: Zonguldak, Turkey
- Height: 1.89 m (6 ft 2 in)
- Position: Attacking midfielder

Youth career
- 1996–1999: Erdemirspor
- 1999–2000: Karadeniz Ereğlispor
- 2000–2001: Antalyaspor

Senior career*
Years	Team	Apps	(Gls)
2001–2003	Sidespor		
2003–2005	Beylerbeyi	50	(34)
2005–2006	Eskişehirspor	30	(11)
2006–2007	Kayseri Erciyesspor	21	(2)
2007–2011	Kayserispor	121	(13)
2011–2013	Antalyaspor	35	(4)
2013–2014	Adana Demirspor	32	(12)
2014–2015	Kayserispor	29	(4)
2015–2016	Karşıyaka	17	(1)
- * Club domestic league appearances and goals as of 23 August 2015

Mehmet Eren Boyraz (born October 11, 1981) is a Turkish football attacking midfielder.

== Honours ==
- Kayserispor
  - Turkish Cup (1): 2008
