= Ali Tandoğan =

Turkish footballer and manager

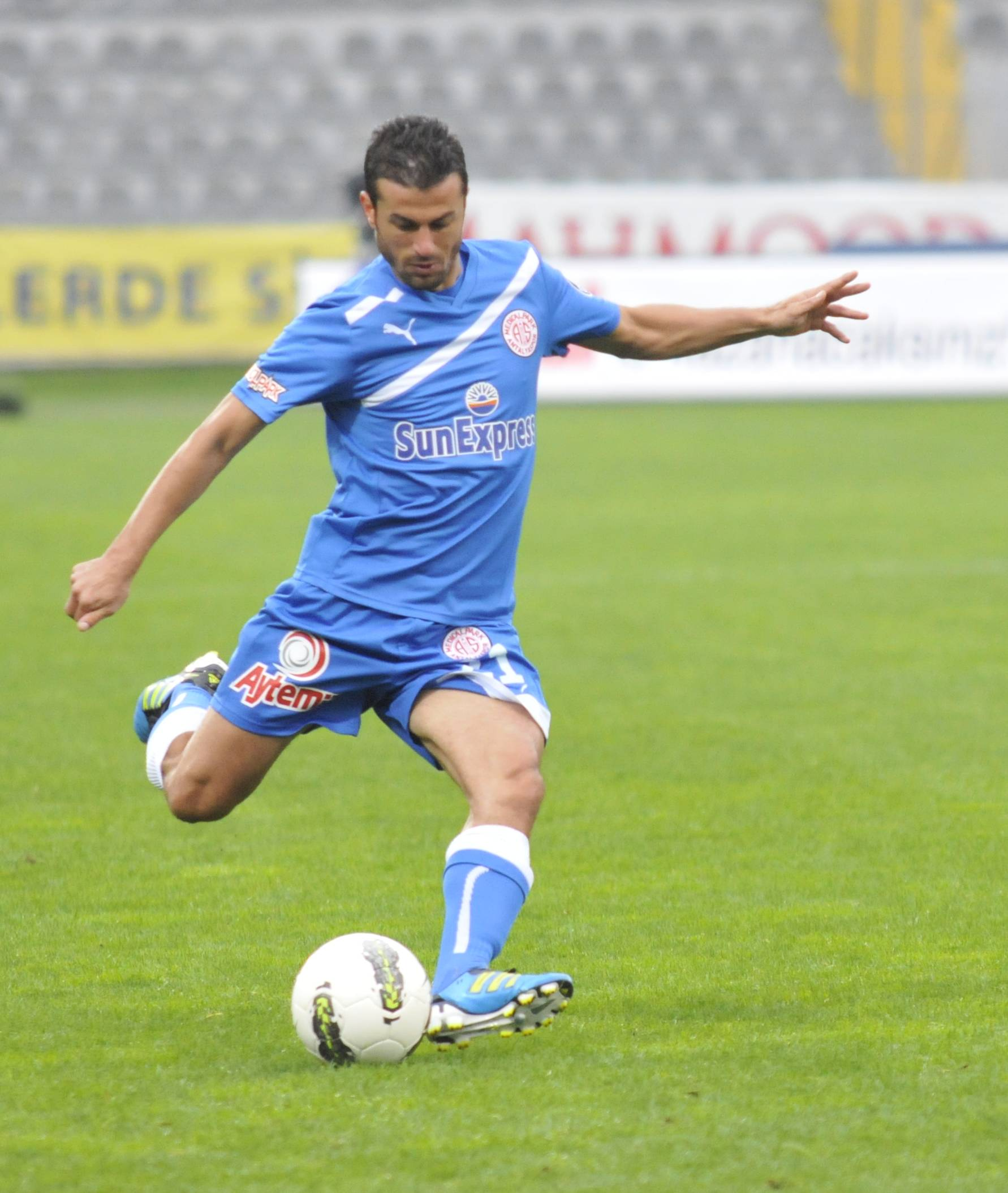

Personal information
- Full name: Ali Tandoğan
- Date of birth: December 25, 1977 (age 48)
- Place of birth: Salihli, Turkey
- Height: 1.75 m (5 ft 9 in)
- Positions: Right back; midfielder

Youth career
- –1996: Yeni Salihlispor

Senior career*
Years	Team	Apps	(Gls)
1996–1998	Yeni Salihlispor	47	(5)
1998–2003	Denizlispor	161	(22)
2003–2005	Gençlerbirliği	53	(8)
2005–2009	Beşiktaş	73	(4)
2009–2011	Bursaspor	71	(4)
2011–2013	Antalyaspor	41	(1)
2013–2014	Mersin İdmanyurdu	33	(3)
2014	Adana Demirspor	11	(0)
2015	Gaziantep BB	13	(0)

International career
2004	Turkey	1	(0)

Managerial career
- 2015–2016: Beylerbeyispor (U15)
- 2016: Denizlispor (sporting director)
- 2016–2017: Denizlispor
- 2017–2018: Şanlıurfaspor
- 2018–2019: Şanlıurfaspor
- 2019: Balıkesirspor
- 2019–2020: Altay
- 2021: Tuzlaspor
- 2021: Denizlispor
- 2021: Şanlıurfaspor
- * Club domestic league appearances and goals

Ali Tandoğan (born 25 December 1977) is a Turkish former football player and coach who was most recently the manager of Şanlıurfaspor.

== Honours ==
- Beşiktaş
  - Turkish Cup (2): 2005–06, 2006–07
  - Turkish Super Cup (1): 2006
- Bursaspor
  - Süper Lig (1): 2009–10
