= Milan Mitrović =

Serbian footballer

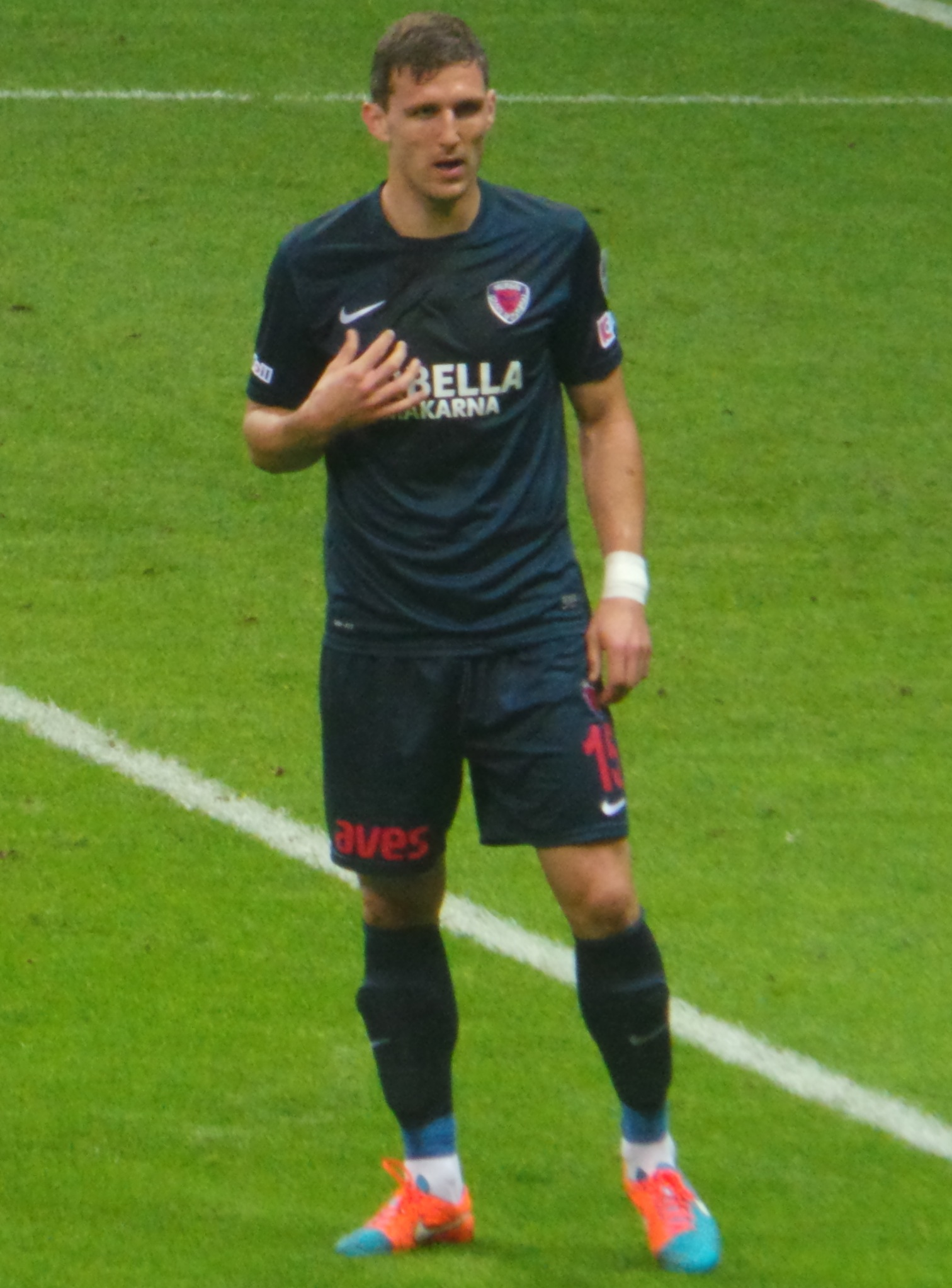
- Mitrović with Mersin İdmanyurdu in 2014

Personal information
- Full name: Milan Mitrović
- Date of birth: 2 July 1988 (age 38)
- Place of birth: Prokuplje, SFR Yugoslavia
- Height: 1.89 m (6 ft 2 1/2 in)
- Position: Centre-back

Team information
- Current team: Napredak Kruševac
- Number: 15

Youth career
- Zemun

Senior career*
Years	Team	Apps	(Gls)
2006–2010	Zemun	105	(1)
2006	→ Milutinac Zemun (loan)	9	(1)
2010–2012	Rad	61	(2)
2013–2017	Mersin İdmanyurdu	130	(9)
2017–2018	Partizan	17	(2)
2018–2020	Adana Demirspor	34	(1)
2021–2022	Levadia	44	(0)
2023–2026	Radnički 1923	80	(1)
2026–	Napredak Kruševac	0	(0)
- * Club domestic league appearances and goals as of 5 June 2026

Milan Mitrović (Serbian Cyrillic: Милан Митровић; born 2 July 1988) is a Serbian professional footballer who plays as a defender for Napredak Kruševac.

== Career ==
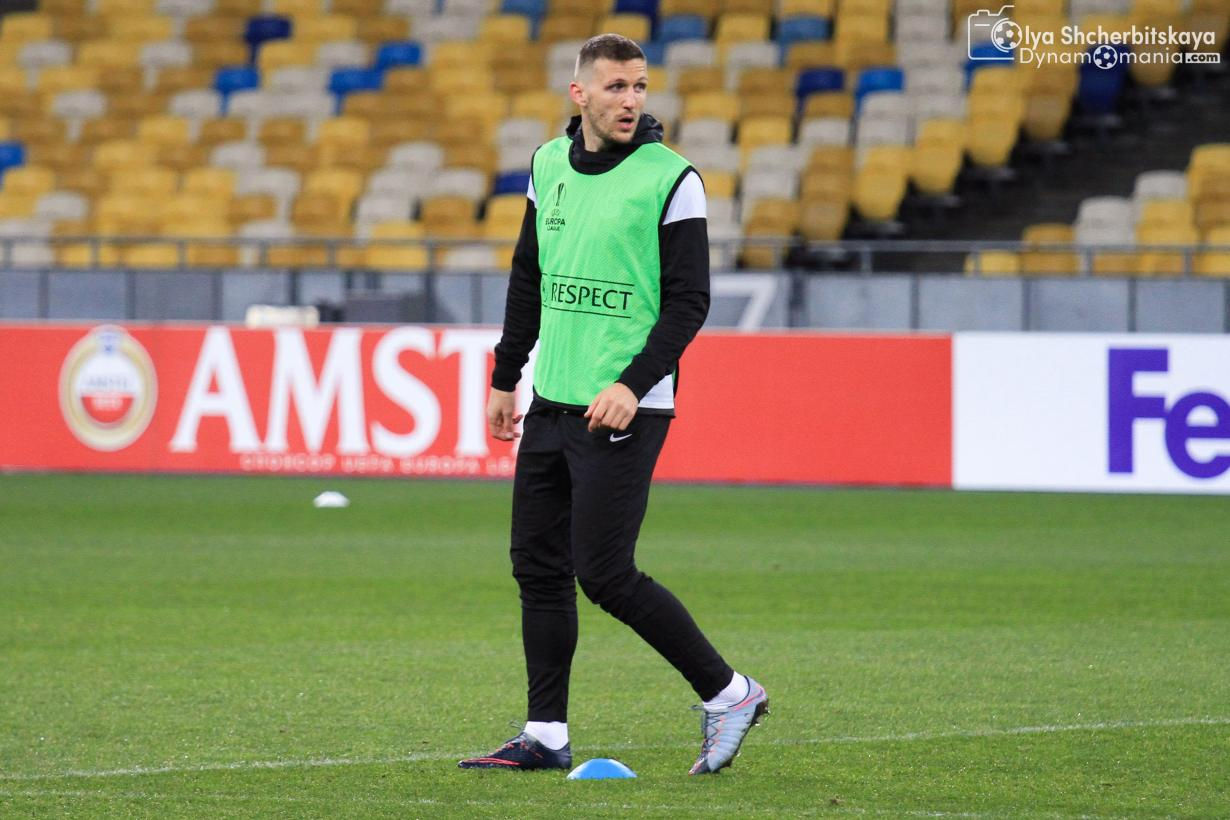
Mitrović with Partizan ahead of the 2017–18 UEFA Europa League match against Dynamo Kyiv

Born in Prokuplje, Mitrović started out at Zemun, making his Serbian SuperLiga debuts in the 2006–07 campaign, aged 18, as the club suffered relegation from the top flight. He spent a total of four seasons with the Gornjovarošani, before transferring to Rad in the summer of 2010. His official debut for the side came in a 0–3 away league loss to Partizan.

In the 2013 winter transfer window, Mitrović was sold to Turkish club Mersin İdmanyurdu, penning a three-and-a-half-year deal. He stayed there for the next four and a half years, collecting almost 150 appearances in all competitions (league and cup). In the summer of 2017, following the club's relegation to the third tier of Turkish football, Mitrović became a free agent.

On 29 August 2017, Mitrović signed a three-year contract with Partizan and was given the number 30 shirt.

== Honours ==
Zemun

- Serbian League Belgrade: 2008–09
- Serbian Cup: Runner-up 2007–08

Partizan

- Serbian Cup: 2017–18

Levadia Tallinn

- Meistriliiga: 2021
- Estonian Supercup: 2022
