= Mehmet Yıldız (footballer) =

Turkish footballer

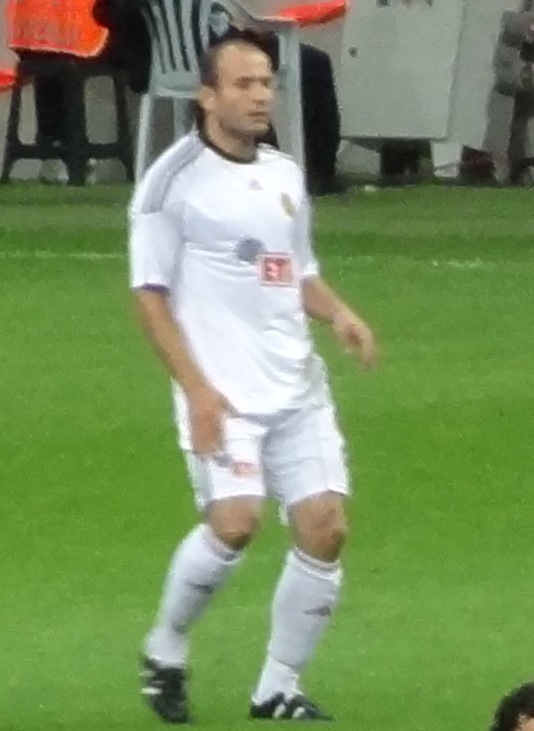

Personal information
- Date of birth: 14 September 1981 (age 45)
- Place of birth: Yozgat, Turkey
- Height: 1.83 m (6 ft 0 in)
- Position: Striker

Youth career
- Tigemspor

Senior career*
Years	Team	Apps	(Gls)
2000–2003	Sivasspor	57	(18)
2000–2001	→ Çarşambaspor (loan)	14	(2)
2003–2004	Antalyaspor	22	(4)
2004–2005	Türk Telekom	15	(8)
2005–2011	Sivasspor	134	(48)
2006	→ İstanbulspor (loan)	16	(13)
2011	Eskişehirspor	15	(2)
2012–2013	Karabükspor	25	(7)
2013–2014	Mersin Idmanyurdu	34	(9)
2014–2015	Osmanlıspor	29	(9)
2015	Ankaragücü	13	(2)

International career
2006–	Turkey	4	(0)
- * Club domestic league appearances and goals as of 5 January 2016

Mehmet Yıldız (born 14 September 1981) is a Turkish footballer who last played as a striker for Ankaragücü.

== Career ==
Mehmet was born in Yozgat, Turkey. He spent much time being loaned out from Sivasspor and also being sold a couple of times. Firstly was his loan spell at Çarşambaspor where he played only a handful of games. He then returned to Sivasspor to become a prominent member of the team. In 2003 Mehmet was sold to Antalyaspor where his career never hit the same heights as while at Sivasspor. The same happened again when he was sold to Türk Telekomspor the following season.

His performances lead Sivasspor to recall him to the first team where he has become club captain and a regular goal scorer for the Kırmızı-Beyaz with near a 1:1 ratio of goals per game.

== Career statistics ==
Club	Season	League		Cup		League Cup		Europe		Total	
Club	Season	Apps	Goals	Apps	Goals	Apps	Goals	Apps	Goals	Apps	Goals
Sivasspor	2000–01	4	0	-	-	-	-	-	-	4	0
Sivasspor	Total	4	0	0	0	0	0	0	0	4	0
Çarşambaspor	2000–01	14	2	-	-	-	-	-	-	14	2
Çarşambaspor	Total	14	2	0	0	0	0	0	0	14	2
Sivasspor	2001–02	23	8	-	-	-	-	-	-	23	8
Sivasspor	2002–03	30	10	-	-	-	-	-	-	30	10
Sivasspor	Total	53	18	0	0	0	0	0	0	53	18
Antalyaspor	2003–04	22	4	-	-	-	-	-	-	22	4
Antalyaspor	Total	22	4	0	0	0	0	0	0	22	4
Türk Telekomspor	2004–05	15	8	-	-	-	-	-	-	15	8
Türk Telekomspor	Total	15	8	0	0	0	0	0	0	15	8
Sivasspor	2004–05	16	5	-	-	-	-	-	-	16	5
Sivasspor	2005–06	14	2	-	-	-	-	-	-	14	2
Sivasspor	Total	30	7	0	0	0	0	0	0	30	7
İstanbulspor	2005–06	16	13	-	-	-	-	-	-	16	13
İstanbulspor	Total	16	13	0	0	0	0	0	0	16	13
Sivasspor	2006–07	25	10	-	-	-	-	-	-	25	10
Sivasspor	2007–08	33	14	-	-	-	-	-	-	33	14
Sivasspor	2008–09	32	14	-	-	-	-	-	-	32	14
Sivasspor	2009–10	13	6	-	-	-	-	-	-	13	6
Sivasspor	2010–11	31	2	-	-	-	-	-	-	31	2
Sivasspor	Total	134	46	0	0	0	0	0	0	134	46
Career total		254	93	0	0	0	0	0	0	254	93

As of 30 January 2012
