= Kuşadasıspor =

- Full name: Kuşadası Gençlik Spor Kulübü
- Founded: 1934; 92 years ago
- Ground: Özer Türk Stadium
- Capacity: 8,000
- Coordinates: 37°50′52″N 27°15′04″E
- Chairman: Alim Emiroğlu
- League: TFF 3. Lig
- 2022–23: TFF 3. Lig, Group 2, 6th
Home colours	Away colours

Kuşadası Gençlik Spor Kulübü (lit. 'Kuşadası Youth-Sports Club'), colloquially known as Kuşadasıspor, are a Turkish professional football club located in the Kuşadası district of Aydın.

== History ==
Beating Aliağa Futbol A.Ş. after penalty shoot-outs by 4–2 on 11 July 2021, the club promoted to TFF Third League for 2021–22 season. On 7 February 2022, the club parted ways with its coach Erman Kılıç and began searching for a replacement. Bülent Ataman was announced the next day as the new coach.

== Stadium ==
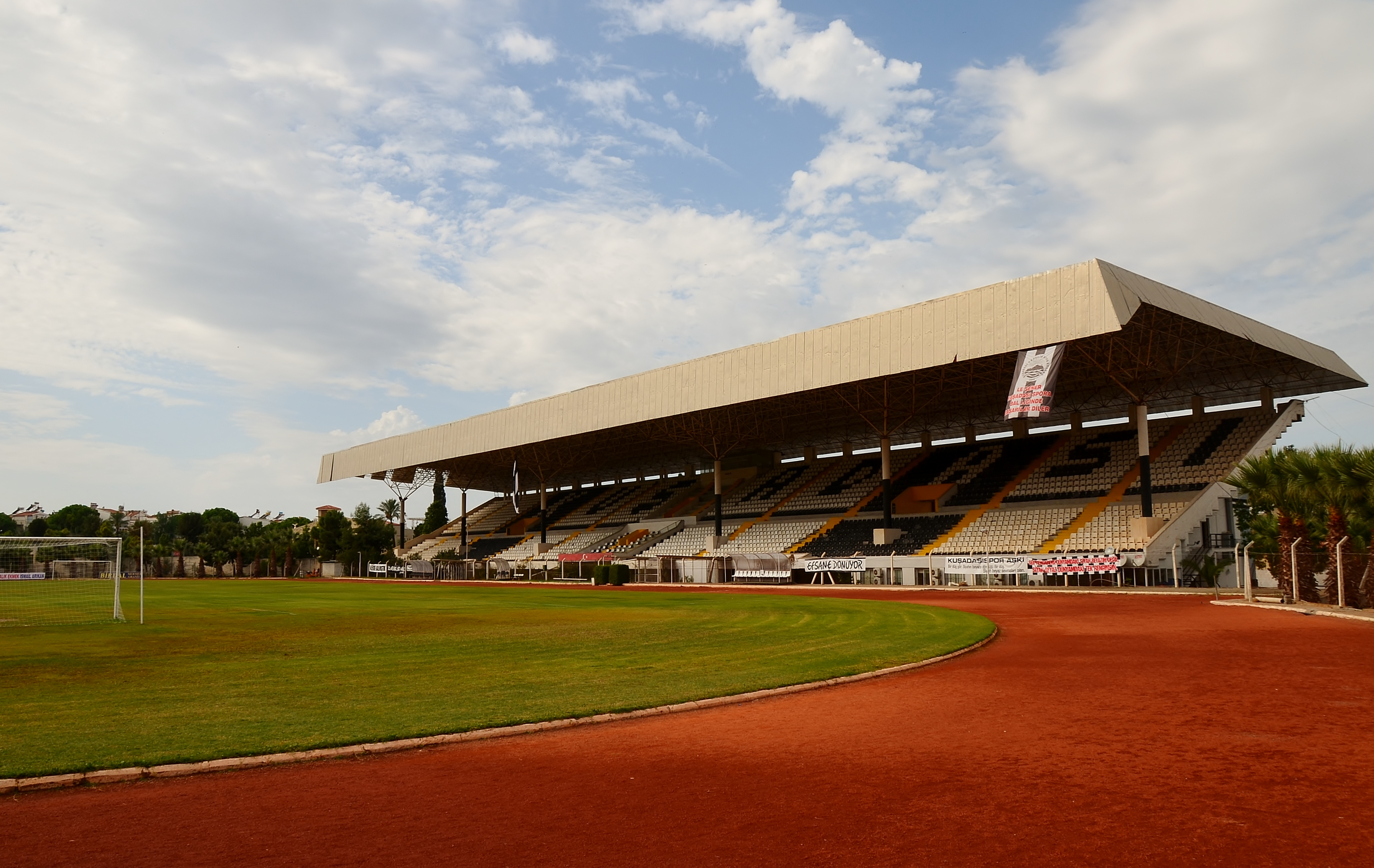
Özer Türk Stadium in 2015

Kuşadasıspor host their home games at Özer Türk Stadium, holding 8,000 seats capacity. The Stadium was renovated in 2020.

== Team records ==
=== League affiliation ===
- TFF First League: 1986–1991, 1996–2000
- TFF Second League: 1984–1986, 1991–1996, 2000–2001
- TFF Third League: 2021–
- Turkish Regional Amateur League: 2010–2011, 2015–2016, 2017–2019, 2020–2021
- Super Amateur Leagues: 1934–1984, 2001–2010, 2011–2015, 2016–2017, 2019–2020

== Honours ==
- TFF Third League
  - Winner: 1985–86, 1995–96
- Aydın Super Amateur League
  - Runner-up: 2014–15, 2016–17
- Aydın First Amateur League
  - Winner: 2013–14

== Kit sponsorships ==
Season	Supplier	Shirt sponsor
2020–21	Nike	Eviz Yapı
