= Eren Özen =

Turkish footballer and coach

Personal information
- Date of birth: 7 August 1983 (age 43)
- Place of birth: Bursa, Turkey
- Positions: Attacking midfielder; wing

Youth career
- 1999: Yalovaspor

Senior career*
Years	Team	Apps	(Gls)
2000–2002	Gençlerbirliği	0	(0)
2002–2008	Hacettepe	144	(33)
2008–2009	Malatyaspor	26	(1)
2009–2013	Gaziantep B.B.	100	(9)
2013–2014	Orduspor	13	(1)
2014–2015	Alanyaspor	19	(1)
2015–2016	Balıkesirspor	3	(0)
2016	Hatayspor	9	(1)
2016–2017	Tokatspor	11	(0)
2017	Bayburt Idare	4	(1)
2017–2018	Altinova Belediyespor		
2018–2019	Yalovaspor		

Managerial career
- 2020: Yalovaspor
- * Club domestic league appearances and goals as of 5 February 2017

Eren Özen (born 7 August 1983) is a Turkish football coach and former player.
