= Raheem Lawal =

Nigerian footballer

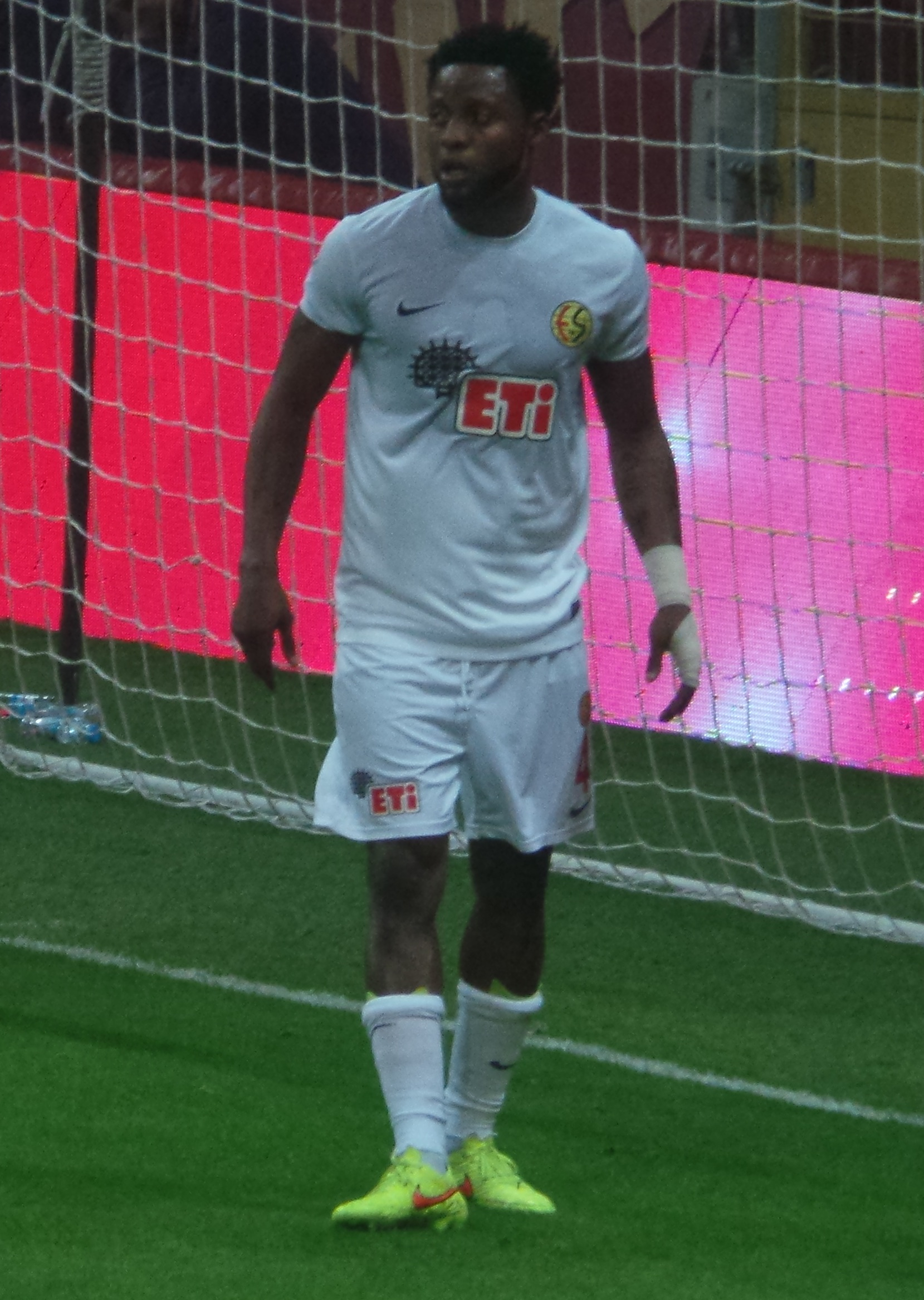

Personal information
- Full name: Raheem Adewole Lawal
- Date of birth: 4 May 1990 (age 36)
- Place of birth: Lagos, Nigeria
- Height: 1.82 m (6 ft 0 in)
- Position: Midfielder

Senior career*
Years	Team	Apps	(Gls)
2009–2012	Atlético Baleares	57	(1)
2012–2013	Adana Demirspor	10	(1)
2013–2014	Mersin İdmanyurdu	26	(5)
2014–2016	Eskişehirspor	50	(2)
2016–2018	Osmanlıspor	35	(1)
2017	→ Kayserispor (loan)	16	(5)
2018–2019	Ittihad Kalba	1	(0)
2019–2020	Fatih Karagümrük	0	(0)
2020–2021	Akhisarspor	7	(0)

International career^{‡}
2012–	Nigeria	4	(0)
- * Club domestic league appearances and goals as of 19:29, 22 August 2019 (UTC) ‡ National team caps and goals as of 21 June 2013

Raheem Adewole Lawal (born 4 May 1990) is a Nigerian professional footballer who plays as a midfielder.

== Career ==
Lawal has played club football in Spain and Turkey for Atlético Baleares, Adana Demirspor and Mersin İdmanyurdu. On 3 February 2014, Lawal joined Turkish Süper Lig side Eskişehirspor, signing a three-and-a-half-year deal.

He made his international debut for Nigeria in 2012, and has appeared in FIFA World Cup qualifying matches.
