= Luiz Henrique (footballer, born 1982) =

Brazilian footballer

Personal information
- Full name: Luiz Henrique de Souza Santos
- Date of birth: 23 September 1982 (age 44)
- Place of birth: Campo Grande, Brazil
- Height: 1.77 m (5 ft 10 in)
- Position: Defender

Senior career*
Years	Team	Apps	(Gls)
2001–2003	Santo André		
2001–2002	→ Portuguesa (loan)		
2003–2004	Portuguesa		
2004	→ Nacional (loan)		
2005–2008	Santo André		
2006	→ Rio Branco (loan)		
2008–2009	Ankaragücü	27	(0)
2009–2010	Poços de Caldas		
2010–2012	Kasımpaşa	48	(2)
2012–2015	Bucaspor	66	(0)
2015–2016	Boluspor	41	(0)
2017	Nacional SP	21	(0)
2017–2018	Campinense	1	(0)
2018	Nacional SP	3	(0)
2018	Novo	5	(0)
- * Club domestic league appearances and goals

Luiz Henrique de Souza Santos or simply Luiz Henrique (born 23 September 1982) is a Brazilian former professional footballer who played as a defender.
