= Muhammet Reis =

Turkish footballer

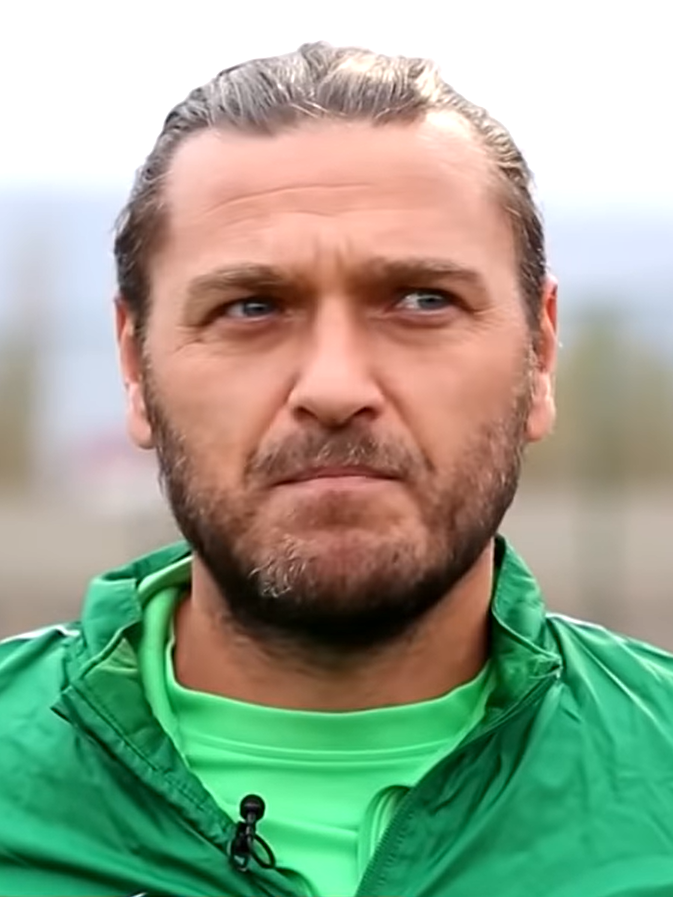

Personal information
- Date of birth: 27 October 1984 (age 42)
- Place of birth: Trabzon, Turkey
- Height: 1.81 m (5 ft 11 1/2 in)
- Position: Attacking midfielder

Youth career
- Trabzonspor

Senior career*
Years	Team	Apps	(Gls)
2004–2005	Erzurumspor	0	(0)
2005	→ Kocaelispor (loan)	15	(0)
2006	→ Akçaabat Sebatspor (loan)	15	(4)
2006–2007	Akçaabat Sebatspor	24	(1)
2007–2008	Arsinspor	0	(0)
2008–2009	→ Akçaabat Sebatspor (loan)	31	(6)
2009–2011	Anadolu Selçukspor	65	(10)
2011–2014	Balıkesirspor	89	(37)
2014–2015	Osmanlıspor	32	(15)
2015–2016	Karabükspor	27	(5)
2016–2018	Gaziantep BB	49	(14)
2018–2019	Giresunspor	36	(8)
2019–2020	Akhisarspor	20	(0)
2020–2021	Sakaryaspor	35	(12)
2021–2023	Iğdır FK	55	(11)
- * Club domestic league appearances and goals

Muhammet Reis (born 27 October 1984) is a Turkish former footballer who played as a midfielder.

He has played for Turkey at the 2005 Mediterranean Games.
