= Wissem Ben Yahia =

Tunisian footballer

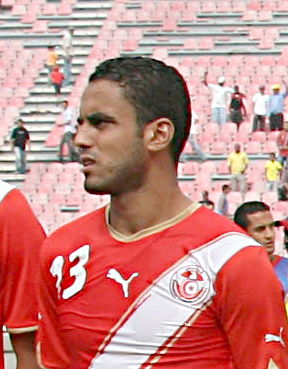

Personal information
- Full name: Wissem ben Yahia
- Date of birth: 9 September 1984 (age 42)
- Place of birth: Tunis, Tunisia
- Height: 1.74 m (5 ft 9 in)
- Position: Midfielder

Senior career*
Years	Team	Apps	(Gls)
2005–2011	Club Africain	231	(27)
2011–2014	Mersin İdmanyurdu	83	(11)
2014–2015	Gaziantep BB	33	(1)
2015–2024	Club Africain	23	(12)

International career^{‡}
2006–2014	Tunisia	34	(2)
- * Club domestic league appearances and goals as of 11 July 2026 ‡ National team caps and goals as of 16:13, 24 March 2020 (UTC)

Wissem Ben Yahia (born 9 September 1984) is a Tunisian professional footballer who plays as a midfielder. He represented Tunisia at international level.

== Club career ==
In July 2011, Ben Yahia signed a three-year contract with Turkish Süper Lig side Mersin İdmanyurdu.

In July 2014, he signed a two-year contract with TFF First League side Gaziantep Büyükşehir Belediyespor.

== International career ==
He was part of the Tunisian 2004 Olympic football team who exited in the first round, finishing third in Group C, behind group and gold medal winners Argentina and runners-up Australia. He has also appeared in several friendlies with the Tunisia national football team.

=== International goals ===
Scores and results list Tunisia's goal tally first.

No	Date	Venue	Opponent	Score	Result	Competition
1.	6 June 2009	Stade Olympique de Radès, Radès, Tunisia	Mozambique	1–0	2–0	2010 FIFA World Cup qualification
2.	20 June 2010	Khartoum Stadium, Khartoum, Sudan	Sudan	1–0	6–2	Friendly
3.	29 February 2012	Stade El Menzah, Tunis, Tunisia	Peru	1–0	1–1	Friendly
