= Cem Sultan (footballer) =

Turkish footballer

Personal information
- Full name: Cem Sultan
- Date of birth: 27 February 1991 (age 35)
- Place of birth: Istanbul, Turkey
- Height: 1.80 m (5 ft 11 in)
- Position: Striker

Team information
- Current team: Nart SK
- Number: 17

Youth career
- 2005–2011: Galatasaray A2

Senior career*
Years	Team	Apps	(Gls)
2011	Galatasaray	1	(0)
2011–2013	Kayserispor	5	(0)
2012–2013	→ Manisaspor (loan)	26	(3)
2014–2015	Mersin İdmanyurdu	11	(2)
2015–2017	Gümüşhanespor	49	(5)
2017–2018	Zonguldak Kömürspor	7	(0)
2018	Tuzlaspor	6	(0)
2018–2020	Modafen F.K.	5	(0)
2022	Nart SK (amateur)	0	(0)
- * Club domestic league appearances and goals as of 2022

Cem Sultan (born 27 February 1991) is a Turkish footballer who plays as a striker for the Circassian club Nart SK in the Amateur league.
