= 2012–13 Mersin İdmanyurdu season =

Mersin İdmanyurdu
2012–13 season
- President: (Turkey) Ali Kahramanlı
- Head coach: (Turkey) Nurullah Sağlam (till 18 December 2012) (Turkey) Giray Bulak (till 8 March 2013) (Turkey) Hakan Kutlu (till 31 May 2013)
- Stadium: Tevfik Sırrı Gür Stadium; Mersin, Turkey (Capacity: 10,128)
- Süper Lig: 18th (relegated)
- Turkish Cup: Eliminated at Group Stage
- Most appearances: (Nigeria) Nduka Ozokwo (37)
- Top goalscorer: League: (Brazil) Márcio Nobre (13); All: (Brazil) Márcio Nobre (14)
Home colours	Away colours	Third colours

Mersin İdmanyurdu (also Mersin İdman Yurdu, Mersin İY, or MİY) Sports Club; located in Mersin, east Mediterranean coast of Turkey in 2012–13. 2012–13 season was the 13th season of Mersin İdmanyurdu football team in Süper Lig, the top level division in Turkey. Mersin İdmanyurdu football team has finished 2012–13 season in 18th place in Turkish Süper Lig and relegated to 2013–14 TFF First League at the end of the season. Team participated in 2012–13 Turkish Cup and was eliminated at group stage.

Ali Kahramanlı was club president. Nurullah Sağlam continued as head coach. However, things have gone bad and he resigned before the end of the first half. Giray Bulak took over the team, but he couldn't succeed yet. Hakan Kutlu was charged to complete the season and prepare team for the next season in the lower league. Attacking midfielder Nduka Ozokwo was the most appeared player with 37 appearances in total. Emmanuel Culio, a winger loaned from Galatasaray made the most appearances in league matches (31 apps.). Márcio Nobre who known as Mert Nobre in Turkey was the top goalscorer with 13 goals.

== 2012–13 Süper Lig participation ==
Mersin İdmanyurdu participated in 2011–12 Süper Lig. The league was played as Spor-Toto Süper Lig in that season due to sponsorship reasons. 18 teams attended. The champions and runners-up were qualified for 2013–14 UEFA Champions League (ECL). The third and fourth teams were qualified for 2013–14 UEFA Europa League (UEL). The third team to be qualified for UEL was the Cup runners-up, because Cup winners were already qualified for ECL. Bottom three teams were relegated to 2013–14 TFF First League.

Mersin İdmanyurdu finished 2012–13 Süper Lig season at 18th place and was relegated to 2013–14 TFF First League at the end of the season.

=== Results summary ===
Mersin İdmanyurdu (MİY) 2011–12 Süper Lig season league summary.

	Overall									Home								Away							
Stage	Pc	Pl	W	D	L	GF	GA	GD	Pt	Pl	W	D	L	GF	GA	GD	Pt	Pl	W	D	L	GF	GA	GD	Pt
First half	17	17	3	6	8	18	27	-9	15	8	3	3	2	10	9	+1	12	9	0	3	6	8	18	-10	3
Second half		17	1	4	12	13	26	-13	7	9	1	2	6	7	11	-4	5	8	0	2	6	6	15	-9	2
Overall	18	34	4	10	20	31	53	-22	22	17	4	5	8	17	20	-3	17	17	0	5	12	14	33	-19	5

Sources: 2012–13 Süper Lig pages.

=== League table ===
Mersin İdmanyurdu (MİY) 2012–13 Süper Lig season place in league table.

Pos	Team	Pld	W	D	L	GF	GA	GD	Pts	Qualification or relegation
14	Akhisar Belediyespor	34	11	9	14	36	44	−8	42	
15	Kardemir Karabükspor	34	11	7	16	41	53	−12	40	
16	İstanbul B.B. (R)	34	9	9	16	43	50	−7	36	Relegation to TFF First League
17	Orduspor (R)	34	6	11	17	35	51	−16	29	Relegation to TFF First League
18	Mersin İdman Yurdu (R)	34	4	10	20	31	53	−22	22	Relegation to TFF First League

Rules for classification: 1) points; 2) goal difference; 3) number of goals scored.
(R) Relegated

=== Results by round ===
Results of games MİY played in 2012–13 Süper Lig by rounds:

Round	1	2	3	4	5	6	7	8	9	10	11	12	13	14	15	16	17	18	19	20	21	22	23	24	25	26	27	28	29	30	31	32	33	34
Ground	H	A	H	A	H	A	H	A	H	A	H	A	H	A	A	H	A	A	H	A	H	A	H	A	H	A	H	A	H	A	H	H	A	H
Result	D	D	L	L	D	D	L	D	W	L	D	L	W	L	L	W	L	D	W	D	L	L	L	L	D	L	L	L	L	L	D	L	L	L
Position	12	13	15	15	17	16	17	17	16	17	17	17	16	16	18	17	17	17	17	17	17	17	18	18	18	18	18	18	18	18	18	18	18	18

Source: TFF League page
A = Away; H = Home; W = Win; D = Draw; L = Loss

=== First half ===
Mersin İdmanyurdu (MİY) 2012–13 Süper Lig season first half game reports is shown in the following table. Kick off times are in EET and EEST.

19 August 2012 Round 1	Mersin İdmanyurdu	0 – 0	Orduspor	Tevfik Sırrı Gür Stadium, Mersin
Sunday 21:45	Milan Stepanov (yellow card) 16'; Mustafa Sarp (yellow card) 59'; Mustafa Keçeli (yellow card) 89'	Report	(yellow card) 55' Ferhat Çökmüş; (yellow card) 75' Miguel Garcia	Referee: Çağatay Şahan

25 August 2012 Round 2	Sivasspor	3 – 3	Mersin İdmanyurdu	4 Eylül Stadium, Sivas
Saturday, 19:00	Aatif Chahechouhe 9' (F); Michael Eneramo 27' (F); Michael Eneramo 34' (F); Kadir Bekmezci (yellow card) 25'; Uğur Kavuk (yellow card) 89'; Doğa Kaya (yellow card) post-match'	Report	17' (F) Emmanuel Culio; 36' (H) Milan Stepanov; 69' (F) Wissem Ben Yahia; (yellow card) 32' Joseph Boum; (yellow card) 79' Emmanuel Culio	Referee: Serkan Çınar

31 August 2012 Round 3	Mersin İdmanyurdu	1 – 3	Eskişehirspor	Tevfik Sırrı Gür Stadium, Mersin
Monday, 21:15	Emmanuel Culio 44' (F); Mustafa Keçeli (yellow card) 78'	Report	1' (F) Diomansy Kamara; 22' (F) Erkan Zengin; 89' (F) Diomansy Kamara	Referee: Mustafa Kamil Abitoğlu

16 September 2012 Round 4	Fenerbahçe	2 – 1	Mersin İdmanyurdu	Şükrü Saracoğlu Stadium, Istanbul
Sunday, 20:30	Mehmet Topal 45' (F); Cristian Baroni 89' (F); Gökhan Gönül (yellow card) 56'; Miroslav Stoch (yellow card) 84'; Cristian Baroni (yellow card) 90'	Report	7' (F) Wissem Ben Yahia; (yellow card) 34' Aydın Toscalı; (yellow card) 80' Nduka Ozokwo; (red card) post-match' Wissem Ben Yahia	Referee: Hüseyin Göçek

22 September 2012 Round 5	Mersin İdmanyurdu	1 – 1	Gençlerbirliği	Tevfik Sırrı Gür Stadium, Mersin
Saturday, 20:00	Márcio Nobre 60' (F); Hakan Bayraktar (yellow card) 36'; Ömer Aysan Barış (yellow card) 62'	Report	43' (F) Ante Kulušić; (yellow card) 6' Serkan Kurtuluş; (yellow card) 33' Radosav Petrović; (yellow card) 86' Ramazan Köse	Attendance: Played without spectators Referee: Özgür Yankaya

30 September 2012 Round 6	Trabzonspor	1 – 1	Mersin İdmanyurdu	Hüseyin Avni Aker Stadium, Trabzon
Sunday, 19:00	Soner Aydoğdu 46' (F); Sol Bamba (yellow card) 61'; Yasin Öztekin (yellow card) 70'	Report	14' (F) Márcio Nobre; (yellow card) 59' Wissem Ben Yahia	Attendance: Played without spectators Referee: Mustafa İlker Coşkun

7 October 2012 Round 7	Mersin İdmanyurdu	1 – 2	Kayserispor	Tevfik Sırrı Gür Stadium, Mersin
Sunday, 19:00	Márcio Nobre 53' (F); Joseph Boum (yellow card) 26'	Report	20' (F) Alexandre Silva Cleyton; 77' (H) Grétar Steinsson; (yellow card) 80' Bobô	Referee: Volkan Bayarslan

21 October 2012 Round 8	Kasımpaşa	2 – 2	Mersin İdmanyurdu	RTE Stadium, Kasımpaşa, Istanbul
Sunday, 16:00	Tabaré Viúdez 90' (F); Adem Büyük 92' (H); Hüseyin Kala (yellow card) 14'	Report	27' (H) Márcio Nobre; 50' (F) Mustafa Keçeli; (yellow card) 20' Hakan Bayraktar; (yellow card) 37' Nduka Ozokwo; (yellow card) 68' Ibrahim Šehić	Referee: Fırat Aydınus

27 October 2012 Round 9	Mersin İdmanyurdu	2 – 0	İstanbul BŞB	Tevfik Sırrı Gür Stadium, Mersin
Saturday, 16:00	Márcio Nobre 23' (H); Márcio Nobre 48' (F); Wissem Ben Yahia (yellow card) 17'; Joseph Boum (yellow card) 57'; Aydın Toscalı (yellow card) 60'; Emmanuel Culio (yellow card) 68'	Report	(yellow card) 44' Metin Depe; (yellow card) 73' Pierre Webó; (yellow card) 88' Kamil Zayatte	Referee: Ali Palabıyık

4 November 2012 Round 10	Beşiktaş	3 – 0	Mersin İdmanyurdu	BJK İnönü Stadium, Istanbul
Sunday, 19:00	Hugo Almeida 7' (pen.); Oğuzhan Özyakup 31' (F); Filip Hološko 45' (F); Roberto Hilbert (yellow card) 30'; Oğuzhan Özyakup (yellow card) 49' (red card); Ersan Gülüm (yellow card) 71'; Allan McGregor (yellow card) 87'	Report	(yellow card) 6' Joseph Boum; (yellow card) 64' Wissem Ben Yahia	Referee: Barış Şimşek

11 November 2012 Round 11	Mersin İdmanyurdu	1 – 1	Galatasaray	Tevfik Sırrı Gür Stadium, Mersin
Sunday, 17:00	Márcio Nobre 63' (H); Serkan Yanık (yellow card) 50'; Emmanuel Culio (yellow card) 74'	Report	48' (F) Umut Bulut; (yellow card) 55' Albert Riera	Referee: Mustafa İlker Coşkun

18 November 2012 Round 12	Bursaspor	3 – 0	Mersin İdmanyurdu	Atatürk Stadium, Bursa
Sunday, 19:00	Ferhat Kiraz 43' (F); Alfred N'Diaye 73' (pen.); Fernando Belluschi 92' (pen.); İbrahim Öztürk (yellow card) 9'; Stanislav Šesták (yellow card) 16'; Serdar Aziz (yellow card) 90+4'	Report	(yellow card) 28' Joseph Boum; (yellow card) 42' Emmanuel Culio; (yellow card) 44' Nduka Ozokwo; (yellow card) 90+2' Murat Erdoğan; (yellow card) 90+2' Ömer Aysan Barış; (yellow card) 90+4' Ivan de Souza	Referee: Bülent Yıldırım

23 November 2012 Round 13	Mersin İdmanyurdu	2 – 1	Kardemir DÇ Karabükspor	Tevfik Sırrı Gür Stadium, Mersin
Friday, 20:00	Márcio Nobre 55' (pen.); Milan Stepanov 89' (H); Mustafa Keçeli (yellow card) 59'; Nduka Ozokwo (yellow card) 65'; Márcio Nobre (yellow card) 89'; Milan Stepanov (yellow card) 89'	Report	62' (H) İlhan Parlak; (red card) 55' İshak Doğan; (yellow card) 75' Ahmet İlhan Özek	Referee: Süleyman Abay

2 December 2012 Round 14	Medical Park Antalyaspor	1 – 0	Mersin İdmanyurdu	Akdeniz University Stadium, Antalya
Sunday, 16:00	Ömer Şişmanoğlu 83' (F); Emre Güngör (yellow card) 48'	Report	(yellow card) 54' Ivan Saraiva de Souza; (yellow card) 80' Eren Tozlu; (yellow card) 86' Márcio Nobre; (yellow card) 89' Danilo Bueno	Referee: Serkan Çınar

7 December 2012 Round 15	Sanica Boru Elazığspor	1 – 0	Mersin İdmanyurdu	Atatürk Stadium, Elazığ
Friday, 20:00	Sinan Kaloğlu 66' (F)	Report	(yellow card) 60' Milan Stepanov; (yellow card) 68' Mustafa Sarp; (yellow card) 88' Mustafa Keçeli	Referee: Mustafa Kamil Abitoğlu

15 December 2012 Round 16	Mersin İdmanyurdu	2 – 1	Akhisar Belediyespor	Tevfik Sırrı Gür Stadium, Mersin
Saturday, 16:00	Ömer Aysan Barış 11' (F); Márcio Nobre 44' (H); Hakan Bayraktar (yellow card) 36'; Aydın Toscalı (yellow card) 39'; Márcio Nobre (yellow card) 52'; Özden Öngün (yellow card) 89'	Report	35' (F) Kenan Özer; (yellow card) 57' Serkan Yalçın; (yellow card) 71' Çağdaş Atan; (yellow card) 86' Ibrahima Sonko	Referee: Abdullah Yılmaz

23 December 2012 Round 17	Gaziantepspor	2 – 1	Mersin İdmanyurdu	Kamil Ocak Stadium, Gaziantep
Sunday, 16:00	Turgut Doğan Şahin 49' (F); Cenk Tosun 85' (F); Haris Medunjanin (yellow card) 65'; Serdar Kurtuluş (yellow card) 89'	Report	51' (F) Murat Ceylan; (yellow card) 50' Özden Öngün; (yellow card) 50' Wissem Ben Yahia; (yellow card) 57' Ömer Aysan Barış; (yellow card) 80' Emmanuel Culio; (yellow card) 84' Danilo Bueno	Referee: Mustafa Öğretmenoğlu

Sources: 2012–13 Süper Lig pages.

=== Second half ===
Mersin İdmanyurdu (MİY) 2012–13 Süper Lig season second half game reports is shown in the following table. Kick off times are in EET and EEST.

21 January 2013 Round 18	Orduspor	1 – 1	Mersin İdmanyurdu	19 Eylül Stadium, Ordu
Monday, 20:00	Şamil Çinaz 87' (H); Ali Çamdalı (yellow card) 44'; Nizamettin Çalışkan (yellow card) 67'; Vincente Alfredo Monje (yellow card) 80'; David Barral (yellow card) 83'; Atila Turan (yellow card) 89'	Report	42' (F) Nduka Ozokwo; (yellow card) 6' Murat Ceylan; (yellow card) 38' Márcio Nobre; (yellow card) 89' Emmanuel Culio	Referee: Ali Palabıyık

27 January 2013 Round 19	Mersin İdmanyurdu	3 – 0	Sivasspor	Tevfik Sırrı Gür Stadium, Mersin
Sunday, 16:00	Emmanuel Culio 11' (F); Emmanuel Culio 43' (pen.); Can Erdem 86' (F); Mehmet Yıldız (yellow card) 79'	Report	(yellow card) 21' Ümit Kurt; (yellow card) 43' Kadir Bekmezci; (yellow card) 73' Arkadiusz Piech; (yellow card) 87' Ziya Erdal	Referee: Bülent Yıldırım

3 February 2013 Round 20	Eskişehirspor	0 – 0	Mersin İdmanyurdu	Atatürk Stadium, Eskişehir
Sunday, 16:00	Servet Çetin (yellow card) 25'; Rodrigo Tello (yellow card) 36'; Atdhe Nuhiu (yellow card) 74'	Report	(yellow card) 37' Burhan Eşer; (yellow card) 56' Murat Ceylan	Referee: Barış Şimşek

10 February 2013 Round 21	Mersin İdmanyurdu	0 – 1	Fenerbahçe	Tevfik Sırrı Gür Stadium, Mersin
Sunday, 16:30	Raheem Lawal (yellow card) 82'	Report	45' (F) Pierre Webó; (yellow card) 88' Raul Meireles	Referee: Özgür Yankaya

17 February 2013 Round 22	Gençlerbirliği	3 – 1	Mersin İdmanyurdu	19 Mayıs Stadium, Ankara
Sunday, 13:30	Björn Vleminckx 32' (H); Jimmy Durmaz 55' (F); Ermin Zec 73' (F); Aykut Demir (yellow card) 54'; Özgür İleri (yellow card) 58'; Ante Kulušić (yellow card) 78'; Duško Tošić (yellow card) 90+1'	Report	79' (F) Emmanuel Culio; (yellow card) 37' Milan Stepanov; (yellow card) 49' Mustafa Keçeli; (yellow card) 65' Joseph Boum; (yellow card) 87' Emmanuel Culio	Referee: Süleyman Abay

23 February 2013 Round 23	Mersin İdmanyurdu	0 – 1	Trabzonspor	Tevfik Sırrı Gür Stadium, Mersin
Saturday, 19:00	Milan Mitrović (yellow card) 23'; Milan Stepanov (yellow card) 47'; Márcio Nobre (yellow card) 70'	Report	36' (F) Paulo Henrique; (yellow card) 20' Ondřej Čelůstka; (yellow card) 65' Paulo Henrique Carneiro Filho	Referee: Tolga Özkalfa

3 March 2013 Round 24	Kayserispor	2 – 1	Mersin İdmanyurdu	Kadir Has Stadium, Kayseri
Sunday, 13:30	Salih Dursun 22' (H); Bobô 56' (F); Abdullah Durak (yellow card) 18'; Zurab Khizanishvili (yellow card) 44'; Ertuğrul Taşkıran (yellow card) 45'; Salih Dursun (yellow card) 45'; Marko Simić (yellow card) 72'; Ömer Bayram (yellow card) 85'	Report	50' (F) Burhan Eşer; (yellow card) 45' Márcio Nobre; (yellow card) 60' Joseph Boum; (yellow card) 89' Mustafa Keçeli; (yellow card) 90+1' Burhan Eşer; (yellow card) 90+1' (red card) Emmanuel Culio; (yellow card) 90+1' Wissem Ben Yahia	Referee: Hüseyin Sabancı

11 March 2013 Round 25	Mersin İdmanyurdu	1 – 1	Kasımpaşa	Tevfik Sırrı Gür Stadium, Mersin
Monday, 20:00	Márcio Nobre 74' (pen.); Serkan Yanık (yellow card) 31'; Raheem Lawal (yellow card) 35'; Ozan İpek (yellow card) 72'; Joseph Boum (yellow card) 81'	Report	28' (F) Kalu Uche; (red card) Abdullah Elyasa Süme; (yellow card) 75' Adem Büyük	Referee: Kuddusi Müftüoğlu

16 March 2013 Round 26	İstanbul BŞB	4 – 2	Mersin İdmanyurdu	Atatürk Olympic Stadium, Istanbul
Saturday, 13:30	Simon Zenke 8' (F); Wellington Brito da Silva 12' (F); Mahmut Tekdemir 65' (H); Samuel Holmén 76' (F); Samuel Holmén (yellow card) 42'; Mahmut Tekdemir (yellow card) 44'; Can Arat (yellow card) 52'; Wellington Brito da Silva (yellow card) 57'; Ömer Can Sokullu (yellow card) 72'	Report	79' (H) Márcio Nobre; 88' (F) Márcio Nobre; (yellow card) 68' Mustafa Keçeli	Referee: Barış Şimşek

1 April 2013 Round 27	Mersin İdmanyurdu	1 – 2	Beşiktaş	Tevfik Sırrı Gür Stadium, Mersin
Monday, 20:00	Márcio Nobre 34' (H); Márcio Nobre 51' (o.g.); Nduka Ozokwo (yellow card) 16'; Murat Ceylan (yellow card) 21'; Aydın Toscalı (yellow card) 32'; Wissem Ben Yahia (yellow card) 54'	Report	32' (F) Manuel Fernandes; (yellow card) 65' Veli Kavlak	Referee: Abdullah Yılmaz

6 April 2013 Round 28	Galatasaray	3 – 1	Mersin İdmanyurdu	Türk Telekom Arena, Istanbul
Saturday, 19:00	Felipe Melo 60' (pen.); Didier Drogba 69' (F); Didier Drogba 83' (H); Dany Nounkeu (red card) 30'; Fernando Muslera (yellow card) 31'; Hakan Balta (yellow card) 31'; Hamit Altıntop (yellow card) 46'; Nordin Amrabat (yellow card) 72'	Report	3' (H) Burhan Eşer; (yellow card) 7' Joseph Boum; (yellow card) 20' Raheem Lawal; (yellow card) 49' Murat Ceylan; (yellow card) 80' Serkan Yanık	Referee: Süleyman Abay

13 April 2013 Round 29	Mersin İdmanyurdu	0 – 1	Bursaspor	Tevfik Sırrı Gür Stadium, Mersin
Saturday, 16:00	Jean-Jacques Gosso (yellow card) 36'; Murat Ceylan (yellow card) 58'	Report	64' (F) Sebastián Pinto; (yellow card) 21' Ferhat Kiraz; (yellow card) 43' Musa Çağıran; (yellow card) 73' Sebastián Pinto	Referee: Serkan Çınar

20 April 2013 Round 30	Kardemir DÇ Karabükspor	1 – 0	Mersin İdmanyurdu	N. Şeyhoğlu Stadium, Karabük
Saturday, 20:00	Lomana LuaLua 73' (F); Larrys Mabiala (yellow card) 90+3'	Report	(yellow card) 40' Jean-Jacques Gosso; (yellow card) 52' Emmanuel Culio; (yellow card) 61' Orkun Uşak	Referee: Suat Arslanboğa

26 April 2013 Round 31	Mersin İdmanyurdu	1 – 1	Medical Park Antalyaspor	Tevfik Sırrı Gür Stadium, Mersin
Friday, 20:00	Milan Stepanov 50' (F); Tanju Kayhan (yellow card) 90+2'	Report	77' (F) Murat Duruer; (yellow card) 60' Emre Güngör; (yellow card) 64' Mehmet Sedef	Referee: Mustafa Aydin

5 May 2013 Round 32	Mersin İdmanyurdu	0 – 2	Sanica Boru Elazığspor	Tevfik Sırrı Gür Stadium, Mersin
Sunday, 20:00	Jean-Jacques Gosso (yellow card) 15'; Wissem Ben Yahia (yellow card) 39'; Tanju Kayhan (yellow card) 70'; Ivan Saraiva de Souza (yellow card) 75'; Burhan Eşer (yellow card) 81'; Milan Stepanov (yellow card) 81'	Report	7' (f) Tidiane Sane; 81' (F) Tidiane Sane; (yellow card) 61' Orhan Ak; (yellow card) 88' Volkan Yılmaz	Referee: Halis Özkahya

13 May 2013 Round 33	Akhisar Belediyespor	1 – 0	Mersin İdmanyurdu	19 Mayıs Stadium, Manisa
Monday, 20:00	Theofanis Gekas 88' (H); Bruno Mezenga (yellow card) 59'; Merter Yüce (yellow card) 75'; Güray Vural (yellow card) 90+2'; Bilal Kısa (yellow card) 90+3'; Çağdaş Atan (yellow card) 90+3'	Report	(yellow card) 14' Eren Tozlu; (yellow card) 26' Emmanuel Culio; (yellow card) 26' Márcio Nobre; (yellow card) 90+2' Burhan Eşer	Referee: Süleyman Abay

17 May 2013 Round 34	Mersin İdmanyurdu	1 – 2	Gaziantepspor	Tevfik Sırrı Gür Stadium, Mersin
Friday, 20:00	Wissem Ben Yahia 72' (F); Emmanuel Culio (yellow card) 44'	Report	27' (F) Turgut Doğan Şahin; 30' (F) Cenk Tosun; (yellow card) 43' Turgut Doğan Şahin; (yellow card) 56' Bekir Ozan Has	Referee: Taner Gizlenci

Sources: 2012–13 Süper Lig pages.

== 2012–13 Turkish Cup participation ==
2012–13 Turkish Cup was played for 51st time as Ziraat Türkiye Kupası for sponsorship reasons. The Cup was played by 156 teams in three stages. In the first stage, 5 one-leg elimination rounds were played. In the second stage 8 remaining teams played in two groups (A and B) in a two-leg round robin system. In the third stage first and second teams in each group played semifinals and after finals Fenerbahçe won the Cup for the 6th time. Mersin İdmanyurdu took place in the Cup starting from second elimination stage and was eliminated in group stage.

=== Cup track ===
The drawings and results Mersin İdmanyurdu (MİY) followed in 2012–13 Turkish Cup are shown in the following table.

Round	Own League	Opponent's League	Opponent	Away	Home	Result
Round 2	Süper Lig	Third League	Siirtspor	–	3–0	Promoted
Round 3	Süper Lig	Second League	Giresunspor	3–0	–	Promoted
Round 4	Süper Lig	Second League	Tokatspor	1–0	–	Promoted
Round 5	Süper Lig	Süper Lig	Gençlerbirliği	3–2	–	Promoted
Group Stage	Süper Lig	Süper Lig	Medical Park Antalyaspor	2–4	0–5	
Group Stage	Süper Lig	Süper Lig	Eskişehirspor	1–3	0–3	
Group Stage	Süper Lig	Süper Lig	Trabzonspor	0–3	0–2	Eliminated

Note: In the above table 'Score' shows For and Against goals whether the match played at home or not.

=== Game details ===
Mersin İdmanyurdu (MİY) 2012–13 Turkish Cup game reports is shown in the following table. Kick off times are in EET and EEST.

27 September 2012 Round 2	Mersin İdmanyurdu	3 – 0	Siirtspor	Tevfik Sırrı Gür Stadium, Mersin
Thursday, 20:30	Eren Tozlu 4' (H); Eren Tozlu 49' (H); Márcio Nobre 53' (H); Ömer Aysan Barış (yellow card) 42'	Report	(yellow card) 48' Ferhat Karakaya	Referee: Mesut Carık

31 October 2012 Round 3	Giresunspor	0 – 3	Mersin İdmanyurdu	Atatürk Stadium, Giresun
Wednesday, 15:30	Burak Karaduman (yellow card) 32'	Report	53' (F) Wissem Ben Yahia; 59' (F) Wissem Ben Yahia; 63' (F) Ergin Keleş; (yellow card) 6' Hasan Üçüncü; (yellow card) 20' Ömer Aysan Barış; (yellow card) 47' Milan Stepanov; (yellow card) 86' Ergin Keleş	Referee: Ömer Faruk Ocak

27 November 2012 Round 4	Tokatspor	0 – 1	Mersin İdmanyurdu	Gaziosmanpaşa Stadium, Tokat
Tuesday, 13:00	Alihan Kubalas (yellow card) 40'; Haluk Ulaşoğlu (yellow card) 57'; Hacı Kalın (yellow card) 79'	Report	65' (F) Mustafa Keçeli; (yellow card) 7' Joseph Boum; (yellow card) 75' Nduka Ozokwo	Referee: Mustafa Aydin

12 December 2012 Round 5	Gençlerbirliği	2 – 3	Mersin İdmanyurdu	19 Mayıs Stadium Ankara
Wednesday, 15:30	Dejan Lekić 71' (F); Artun Akçakın 90' (F); Radosav Petrović (yellow card) 62'	Report	64' (F) Danilo Bueno; 75' (F) Emmanuel Culio; 88' (F) Ergin Keleş; (yellow card) 25' Hasan Üçüncü; (yellow card) 65' Eren Tozlu	Referee: Barış Şimşek

20 December 2012 Round 1	Mersin İdmanyurdu	0 – 5	Medical Park Antalyaspor	Tevfik Sırrı Gür Stadium, Mersin
Thursday, 18:00	Danilo Bueno (yellow card) 70'	Report	9' (H) Lamine Diarra; 27' (F) Ergün Teber; 55' (pen.) Ismaïl Aissati; 60' (F) Lamine Diarra; 80' (F) Nikola Žižić; (yellow card) 8' Emre Güngör	Referee: İlker Meral

11 January 2013 Round 2	Eskişehirspor	3 – 1	Mersin İdmanyurdu	Atatürk Stadium Eskişehir
Friday, 19:00	Erkan Zengin 21' (F); Goran Čaušić 43' (F); Necati Ateş 87' (F); Diomansy Kamara (yellow card) 69'	Report	50' (F) Nduka Ozokwo; (yellow card) 68' Burhan Eşer	Referee: Çağatay Şahan

15 January 2013 Round 3	Mersin İdmanyurdu	0 – 2	Trabzonspor	Tevfik Sırrı Gür Stadium, Mersin
Tuesday, 20:30	Mahmut Metin (yellow card) 80'; Ivan Saraiva de Souza (yellow card) 90+2'	Report	35' (H) Mustafa Yumlu; 83' (F) Mustafa Yumlu; (yellow card) 29' Tolga Zengin; (yellow card) 73' Alanzinho	Referee: Fırat Aydınus

24 January 2013 Round 4	Trabzonspor	3 – 0	Mersin İdmanyurdu	Hüseyin Avni Aker Stadium, Trabzon
Thursday, 20:30	Adrian Mierzejewski 5' (F); Róbert Vittek 42' (F); Halil Altıntop 86' (F); Marek Čech (yellow card) 24'; Olcan Adın (yellow card) 69'	Report	(yellow card) 32' Can Erdem	Referee: Özgüç Türkalp

30 January 2013 Round 5	Medical Park Antalyaspor	4 – 2	Mersin İdmanyurdu	Akdeniz University Stadium, Antalya
Wednesday, 20:30	Lamine Diarra 1' (H); Lamine Diarra 5' (H); Emrah Başsan 38' (F); Koray Arslan 88' (F); Zeki Yıldırım (yellow card) 42'; Musa Nizam (yellow card) 63'; Nikola Žižić (yellow card) 89'	Report	74' (F) Burhan Eşer; 89' (F) Nduka Ozokwo; (yellow card) 23' Can Erdem	Referee: Hakan Ceylan

27 February 2013 Round 6	Mersin İdmanyurdu	0 – 3	Eskişehirspor	Tevfik Sırrı Gür Stadium, Mersin
Wednesday, 18:00	Aydın Toscalı 77' (o.g.); Raheem Lawal (yellow card) 31'; Eren Tozlu (yellow card) 67'; Ozan İpek (yellow card) 68'; Milan Stepanov (yellow card) 74'; Can Erdem (yellow card) 83'	Report	48' (F) Jerry Akaminko; 50' (H) Erkan Zengin; (yellow card) 37' Veysel Sarı	Referee: Kutluhan Bilgiç

Source: 2012–13 Turkish Cup (Ziraat Türkiye Kupası) pages.

== Management ==
- Club address was: Palmiye Mah. Adnan Menderes Bl. 1204 Sk. Onur Ap. K.2 D.3 Yenişehir/Mersin.

=== Club management ===
- President Ali Kahramanlı continued in his position which he held in 2008.

=== Coaching team ===
- Since 22 October 2010 until 18 December 2012. Head coach: Nurullah Sağlam. In his technical team were Lütfü Hindal Gündüz (trainer), Kadir Ekinci (masseur).
- Since 20 December 2012 until 8 March 2013. Head coach: Giray Bulak.
- Since 8 March 2013 until 6 March 2014. Head coach: Hakan Kutlu. His assistant was Kadir Tolga Demirtaş (trainer).

2012–13 Mersin İdmanyurdu head coaches

Nat	Head coach	Period	Pl	W	D	L	Notes
(Turkey)	Nurullah Sağlam	11.07.2011 – 18.12.2012	20	7	6	7	Left after 16th round.
(Turkey)	Giray Bulak	20.12.2012 – 08.03.2013	14	1	2	11	Left after 24th round.
(Turkey)	Hakan Kutlu	08.03.2013 – 31.05.2013	10	0	2	8	Continued in the next season.

Note: Only official games were included.

== 2012–13 squad ==
Appearances, goals and cards count for 2012–13 Süper Lig and 2012–13 Turkish Cup games. Only the players who appeared in game rosters were included. Kit numbers were allowed to select by players. 18 players appeared in each game roster, three to be replaced. Players are listed in order of appearance.

O	N	Nat	Name	Birth	Born	Pos	LA	LG	CA	CG	TA	TG	Yellow card	Red card	← Season Notes →
1	12	(Bosnia and Herzegovina)	Ibrahim Šehić	2 Sep 1988	Rogatica	GK	14		1		15		1		→ previous season.
2	5	(Serbia)	Milan Stepanov	2 Apr 1983	Kisač	DF	26	3	3		29	3	8	1	2012 ST Bursaspor.
3	7	(Nigeria)	Nduka Ozokwo	25 Dec 1988	Enugu	MF	30	1	7	2	37	3	6		→ previous season.
4	9	(Turkey)	Ergin Keleş	1 Jan 1987	Arsin	FW	11		5	2	16	2	1		2012 ST Karabükspor.
5	13	(Tunisia)	Wissem Ben Yahia	9 Sep 1984	Tunis	MF	28	3	2	2	30	5	7	1	→ previous season.
6	16	(Turkey)	Mustafa Sarp	5 Nov 1980	Bakırköy	MF	10		2		12		2		2012 ST Karabükspor.
7	18	(Guinea)	Ibrahim Yattara	3 Jun 1980	Kamsar	MF	4		1		5				2012 ST Al Shabab FC.
8	23	(Turkey)	Mustafa Keçeli	15 Sep 1978	Ankara	DF	20	1	5	1	25	2	7		→ previous season.
9	25	(Turkey)	Aydın Toscalı	14 Aug 1980	Aydın	DF	10		3		13		4		2012 ST Ankaragücü.
10	55	(Turkey)	Hakan Bayraktar	11 Feb 1976	Samsun	MF	26		5		31		3		→ previous season.
11	87	(Turkey)	Serkan Yanık	2 Apr 1987	Troyes	DF	25		6		31		4		2012 ST Bucaspor.
12	38	(Liechtenstein)	Cengiz Biçer	11 Dec 1987	Grabs	GK	1				1				→ previous season.
13	8	(Brazil)	Danilo Bueno	7 Dec 1981	São Paulo	MF	7		5	1	12	1	3		→ previous season.
14	10	(Argentina)	Emmanuel Culio	30 Aug 1983	Buenos Aires	MF	31	5	4	1	35	6	11	1	2012 SL Galatasaray.
15	17	(Turkey)	Erdal Kılıçaslan	23 Aug 1984	Munich	MF	1				1				→ previous season.
16	20	(Turkey)	Nurullah Kaya	20 Jul 1986	Batman	MF	2		8		10				→ previous season.
17	33	(Turkey)	Murat Erdoğan	1 Aug 1976	London	MF	13		3		16		1		2012 ST Manisaspor.
18	94	(Turkey)	Mahmut Metin	12 Jul 1994	Besni	MF			1		1				→ previous season.
19	3	(Cameroon)	Joseph Boum	26 Sep 1989	Yaoundé	DF	16		2		18		10		→ previous season.
20	11	(Brazil)	Márcio Nobre	6 Nov 1980	Jateí	FW	30	13	3	1	33	14	7		→ previous season.
21	1	(Turkey)	Özden Öngün	10 Sep 1978	İzmit	GK	3		4		7		2		2012 ST Gaziantepspor.
22	6	(Brazil)	Ivan de Souza	18 Jan 1982	Campinas	DF	27		4		31		4		2012 ST Gaziantepspor.
23	4	(Turkey)	Murat Ceylan	2 Mar 1988	Gaziantep	MF	18	1	9		17	1	4		2012 ST Gaziantepspor.
24	41	(Turkey)	Ömer Aysan Barış	23 Jul 1982	İzmit	DF	7	1	3		10	1	4		2012 ST Manisaspor.
25	15	(Turkey)	Hasan Üçüncü	16 Nov 1980	Sürmene	MF	1		5		6		2		→ previous season.
26	22	(Poland)	Marcin Robak	29 Nov 1982	Legnica	FW			2		2				2012 ST Konyaspor.
27	28	(Turkey)	Eren Tozlu	27 Dec 1990	Giresun	FW	15		9	2	24	2	4		2012 ST Giresunspor.
28	44	(Turkey)	Abdulkadir Korkut	7 Nov 1993	Mersin	DF	4				4				→ previous season.
29	89	(Turkey)	Abdullah Halman	15 Aug 1987	Şanlıurfa	FW			3		3				2012 ST Gaziantep BB.
30	54	(Turkey)	Orkun Uşak	5 Nov 1980	Istanbul	GK	5		5		10		1		2013 WT Antalyaspor.
31	19	(Turkey)	Can Erdem	8 Jun 1987	Şişli	FW	4	1	5		9	1	3		2013 WT Denizlispor.
32	24	(Turkey)	Tanju Kayhan	21 Jul 1989	Vienna	DF	11		5		16		2		2013 WL Beşiktaş.
33	21	(Turkey)	Burhan Eşer	1 Jan 1985	Lice	MF	16	2	4	1	20	3	5		2013 WL Eskişehirspor.
34	35	(Czech Republic)	David Bičík	6 Apr 1981	Prague	GK	11				11				2013 WT Slovan Liberec.
35	30	(Serbia)	Milan Mitrović	2 Jul 1988	Prokuplje	DF	14		2		16		1		2013 WT FK Rad.
36	58	(Turkey)	Mehmet Yıldız	14 Sep 1981	Yozgat	FW	7		2		9		1		2013 WT Karabükspor.
37	77	(Turkey)	Ozan İpek	10 Oct 1986	Ankara	MF	4		2		6		2		2013 WT Bursaspor
38	93	(Turkey)	Mert Can	9 Oct 1993	Mersin	DF	1				1				→ previous season
39	88	(Nigeria)	Raheem Lawal	4 May 1990	Lagos	MF	11		1		12		4		2013 WT Adana Demirspor
40	78	(Turkey)	Yenal Tuncer	28 Apr 1985	Denizli	DF			1		1				2013 WL Bursaspor.
41	91	(Turkey)	Tarık Altuntaş	23 Aug 1991	Bor	MF									→ previous season
42	47	(Ivory Coast)	Jean-Jacques Gosso	15 Mar 1983	Grand-Béréby	MF	6				6		3		2013 WT Orduspor.
43	95	(Turkey)	Burak Can Kalender	24 Jun 1995	Seyhan	MF	1				1				→ previous season

Sources: TFF club page and maçkolik team page.

== U-21 team ==
Mersin İdmanyurdu U-21 team had participated in 2012–13 U-21 League. League was played in three stages. In the first stage, 46 teams played ranking group games in 4 groups on regional basis. 2 consisted of 11 and 2 consisted of 12 teams. In the second stage winners and runners-up of each ranking group constituted final group while the rest played classification group games. In the third stage, winners of classification groups played quarterfinals with first four placed teams in final group. Mersin idmanyurdu U-21 team took place in Ranking Group 4 and finished 6th in the first stage. In the second stage the team took place in Classification Group 4 and finished 4th with 17 wins, 8 deuces and 15 losses.

== See also ==
- Football in Turkey
