= 2012–13 Süper Lig =

55th season of top-tier Turkish football

Süper Lig
- Season: 2012–13
- Champions: Galatasaray; 19th title
- Relegated: Mersin İdmanyurdu; Orduspor; İstanbul BB
- Champions League: Galatasaray; Fenerbahçe
- Europa League: Beşiktaş; Bursaspor; Trabzonspor
- Matches: 306
- Goals: 817 (2.67 per match)
- Top goalscorer: Burak Yılmaz (24)
- Biggest home win: Gençlerbirliği 4–0 Kayserispor; Antalyaspor 4–0 Elazığspor; Eskişehirspor 4–0 Gaziantepspor
- Biggest away win: Antalyaspor 0–4 Galatasaray; Belediyespor 0–4 İstanbul BB; Elazığspor 0–4 Kayserispor; Gençlerbirliği 0-4 Trabzonspor
- Highest scoring: Antalyaspor 3–5 Beşiktaş; Antalyaspor 3–5 Gençlerbirliği
- Longest winning run: 7 games Galatasaray
- Longest unbeaten run: 11 games Beşiktaş
- Longest winless run: 15 games Mersin İdmanyurdu
- Longest losing run: 10 games Orduspor
- Average attendance: 13,074

The 2012–13 Süper Lig (known as the Spor Toto Süper Lig for sponsorship reasons) was the 55th season of the Süper Lig, the highest football league of Turkey. Galatasaray are the defending champions. The season began on 17 August 2012 and ended on 19 May 2013.

On 5 May, Galatasaray won a record 19th Turkish title after beating Sivasspor 4–2.

== Teams ==
Location of teams in 2012–13 Süper Lig

Samsunspor, Manisaspor and Ankaragücü were relegated at the end of the 2011–12 season after finishing in the bottom three places of the standings. Ankaragücü concluded 31 years at top level, Manisaspor returned to second level after 2 years and Samsunspor immediately returned to second one.

The relegated teams were replaced by 2011–12 TFF First League champions Akhisar Belediyespor, runners-up Elazığspor and promotion play-off winners Kasımpaşa S.K. Elazığspor returned to the top level after 8 years by making two successive promotions. Akhisar Belediyespor makes its debut in Turkey's top flight. Kasımpaşa returned immediately after their relegation to the First League in the 2010–11 season. Elazığspor got sponsorship from Sanica Boru and changed their name to "Sanica Boru Elazığspor".

=== Team overview ===
Team	Home city	Head coach	Captain	Kit manufacturer	Shirt sponsor	Stadium	Capacity
Akhisar Belediyespor	Manisa	(Turkey) Hamza Hamzaoğlu	(Turkey) Emrah Eren	Nike	Köfteci Ramiz	Manisa 19 Mayıs Stadium	16,597
Beşiktaş	Istanbul	(Turkey) Samet Aybaba	(Turkey) İbrahim Toraman	Adidas	Toyota	BJK İnönü Stadium	32,086
Bursaspor	Bursa	(Turkey) Hikmet Karaman	(Turkey) Ömer Erdoğan	Puma	InterCity	Bursa Atatürk Stadium	25,661
Eskişehirspor	Eskişehir	(Turkey) Ersun Yanal	(Turkey) Servet Çetin	Nike	Eti	Eskişehir Atatürk Stadium	13,520
Fenerbahçe	Istanbul	(Turkey) Aykut Kocaman	(Turkey) Emre Belözoğlu	Adidas	Türk Telekom	Şükrü Saracoğlu Stadium	55,526
Galatasaray	Istanbul	(Turkey) Fatih Terim	(Turkey) Sabri Sarıoğlu	Nike	Türk Telekom	Türk Telekom Arena	52,652
Gaziantepspor	Gaziantep	(Turkey) Bülent Uygun	(Turkey) Serdar Kurtuluş	Nike	Riga Boya	Kamil Ocak Stadium	16,981
Gençlerbirliği	Ankara	(Turkey) Fuat Çapa	(Turkey) Cem Can	Lotto	ICK Yapı	Ankara 19 Mayıs Stadium	19,209
İstanbul BB	Istanbul	(Turkey) Bülent Korkmaz	(Turkey) Efe İnanç	Nike	Medipol	Atatürk Olympic Stadium	83,092
Karabükspor	Karabük	(Turkey) Tolunay Kafkas	(Turkey) Muhammet Özdin	Lescon	Kardemir	Dr. Necmettin Şeyhoğlu Stadium	7,593
Kasımpaşa	Istanbul	(Georgia (country)) Shota Arveladze	(Germany) Fabian Ernst	Lotto	UCZ	Recep Tayyip Erdoğan Stadium	14,234
Kayserispor	Kayseri	(Croatia) Robert Prosinečki	(Turkey) Eren Güngör	Adidas		Kadir Has Stadium	32,864
Medical Park Antalyaspor	Antalya	(Turkey) Mehmet Özdilek	(Turkey) Uğur İnceman	Puma		Akdeniz University Stadium	7,083
Mersin İdmanyurdu	Mersin	(Turkey) Hakan Kutlu	(Brazil) Mert Nobre	Hummel		Tevfik Sırrı Gür Stadium	10,128
Orduspor	Ordu	(Turkey) Cevat Güler	(Turkey) Hasan Kabze	Umbro	Spor Toto	19 Eylül Stadium	11,024
Sanica Boru Elazığspor	Elazığ	(Turkey) Yılmaz Vural	(Turkey) Bülent Ertuğrul	Umbro	Kolin	Elazığ Atatürk Stadium	13,923
Sivasspor	Sivas	(Turkey) Rıza Çalımbay	(Turkey) Hayrettin Yerlikaya	Adidas	Riga Boya	Sivas 4 Eylül Stadium	14,998
Trabzonspor	Trabzon	(Turkey) Mustafa Reşit Akçay	(Turkey) Tolga Zengin	Nike	Türk Telekom	Hüseyin Avni Aker Stadium	24,169

=== Managerial changes ===
Team	Outgoing manager	Manner of departure	Date of vacancy	Replaced by	Date of appointment
İstanbul BB	(Turkey) Arif Erdem	Sacked	14 May 2012	(Portugal) Carlos Carvalhal	16 May 2012
Karabükspor	(Turkey) Bülent Korkmaz	Sacked	8 May 2012	(Germany) Michael Skibbe	17 May 2012
Beşiktaş	(Turkey) Tayfur Havutçu	Sacked	20 May 2012	(Turkey) Samet Aybaba	16 June 2012
Kasımpaşa	(Turkey) Metin Diyadin	Resignation	23 September 2012	(Georgia (country)) Shota Arveladze	8 October 2012
Kayserispor	(Georgia (country)) Shota Arveladze	Resignation	1 October 2012	(Croatia) Robert Prosinečki	15 October 2012
Elazığspor	(Turkey) Bülent Uygun	Resignation	8 October 2012	(Turkey) Yılmaz Vural	10 October 2012
Karabükspor	(Germany) Michael Skibbe	Sacked	4 November 2012	(Turkey) Mesut Bakkal	6 November 2012
İstanbul BB	(Portugal) Carlos Carvalhal	Resigned	12 November 2012	(Turkey) Bülent Korkmaz	13 November 2012
Mersin İdmanyurdu	(Turkey) Nurullah Sağlam	Sacked	15 December 2012	(Turkey) Giray Bulak	20 December 2012
Trabzonspor	(Turkey) Şenol Güneş	Resigned	27 January 2013	(Turkey) Tolunay Kafkas	28 January 2013
Bursaspor	(Turkey) Ertuğrul Sağlam	Resigned	27 January 2013	(Turkey) Hikmet Karaman	6 February 2013
Gaziantepspor	(Turkey) Hikmet Karaman	Sacked	5 February 2013	(Turkey) Bülent Uygun	8 February 2013
Mersin İdmanyurdu	(Turkey) Giray Bulak	Sacked	7 March 2013	(Turkey) Hakan Kutlu	8 March 2013
Orduspor	(Argentina) Héctor Cúper	Sacked	13 April 2013	(Turkey) Cevat Güler	13 April 2013
Karabükspor	(Turkey) Mesut Bakkal	Sacked	6 May 2013	(Turkey) Tolunay Kafkas	8 May 2013
Elazığspor	(Turkey) Yılmaz Vural	Resignation	19 May 2013	Vacant	Vacant

=== Foreign players ===
The match squad must have no more than 5 foreign players, while a club may registered a maximum of 8 foreign players

Club	Player 1	Player 2	Player 3	Player 4	Player 5	Player 6	Player 7	Player 8	Former Players
Akhisarspor	(Argentina) Luciano Guaycochea	(Australia) Kerem Bulut	(Brazil) Bruno Mezenga	(Cameroon) Severin Bikoko	(Greece) Theofanis Gekas	(Nigeria) Gideon Sani	(Senegal) Ibrahima Sonko		(Brazil) Diego Lima
Antalyaspor	(Cameroon) Sammy Ndjock	(Croatia) Nikola Žižić	(Czech Republic) Petr Janda	(Morocco) Ismaïl Aissati	(Nigeria) Isaac Promise	(Senegal) Lamine Diarra			(Bulgaria) Veselin Minev
Beşiktaş	(Brazil) Dentinho	(Czech Republic) Tomáš Sivok	(France) Julien Escudé	(Germany) Roberto Hilbert	(Portugal) Manuel Fernandes	(Scotland) Allan McGregor	(Senegal) Mamadou Niang	(Slovakia) Filip Hološko	(Portugal) Hugo Almeida (Portugal) Ricardo Quaresma
Bursaspor	(Argentina) Fernando Belluschi	(Argentina) Pablo Batalla	(Chile) Sebastián Pinto	(England) Anton Ferdinand	(England) Scott Carson	(Morocco) Michaël Chrétien	(United States) Maurice Edu	(Slovakia) Stanislav Šesták	(Finland) Petteri Forsell (Sierra Leone) Teteh Bangura
Elazığspor	(Bosnia and Herzegovina) Ivan Sesar	(Brazil) Fábio Bilica	(Croatia) Vanja Iveša	(England) Jake Jervis	(Netherlands) Marvin Zeegelaar	(Netherlands) Roland Alberg	(Senegal) Tidiane Sane	(Sweden) Emir Kujović	(Cameroon) Hervé Tum (Croatia) Hrvoje Spahija (Egypt) Amr Zaki (France) Julien Faubert (Guinea) Pascal Feindouno
Eskişehirspor	(Belgium) Ruud Boffin	(Brazil) Dedé	(Brazil) Diego Ângelo	(Chile) Rodrigo Tello	(Ghana) Jerry Akaminko	(Kosovo) Atdhe Nuhiu	(Senegal) Diomansy Kamara	(Serbia) Goran Čaušić	(Poland) Patryk Małecki
Fenerbahçe	(Brazil) Crsitian	(Cameroon) Pierre Webó	(Netherlands) Dirk Kuyt	(Nigeria) Joseph Yobo	(Portugal) Raul Meireles	(Senegal) Moussa Sow	(Slovakia) Miroslav Stoch	(Switzerland) Reto Ziegler	(Brazil) Alex (Cameroon) Henri Bienvenu (Serbia) Miloš Krasić
Galatasaray	(Brazil) Felipe Melo	(Cameroon) Dany Nounkeu	(Ivory Coast) Didier Drogba	(Ivory Coast) Emmanuel Eboué	(Morocco) Nordin Amrabat	(Netherlands) Wesley Sneijder	(Spain) Albert Riera	(Uruguay) Fernando Muslera	(Brazil) Cris (Czech Republic) Tomáš Ujfaluši (Sweden) Johan Elmander
Gaziantepspor	(Bosnia and Herzegovina) Haris Medunjanin	(Brazil) Wílton Figueiredo	(Burkina Faso) Abdou Traoré	(Cameroon) Dorge Kouemaha	(Cameroon) Gilles Binya	(Lithuania) Darvydas Šernas	(Lithuania) Žydrūnas Karčemarskas	(Montenegro) Ivan Kecojević	(Argentina) Ismael Sosa (Bosnia and Herzegovina) Senijad Ibričić (Brazil) Ivan
Gençlerbirliği	(Bosnia and Herzegovina) Ermin Zec	(Belgium) Björn Vleminckx	(Costa Rica) Randall Azofeifa	(Croatia) Ante Kulušić	(Serbia) Dejan Lekić	(Serbia) Duško Tošić	(Serbia) Nemanja Tomić	(Serbia) Radosav Petrović	(Albania) Debatik Curri (Nigeria) Ekigho Ehiosun
İstanbul BB	(Bosnia and Herzegovina) Edin Višća	(Brazil) Doka Madureira	(Brazil) Tom	(Guinea) Kamil Zayatte	(Nigeria) 'Simon Zenke	(Portugal) Eduardo	(Portugal) Geraldes	(Sweden) Samuel Holmén	(Cameroon) Pierre Webó
Karabükspor	(Algeria) Jugurtha Hamroun	(Cameroon) Armand Deumi	(Croatia) Anthony Šerić	(Croatia) Vjekoslav Tomić	(Democratic Republic of the Congo) Larrys Mabiala	(Democratic Republic of the Congo) Lomana LuaLua	(Jamaica) Luton Shelton		(Bosnia and Herzegovina) Sanel Jahić (Romania) Florin Cernat
Kasımpaşa	(Angola) Djalma	(Argentina) Matías Fritzler	(Bosnia and Herzegovina) Senijad Ibričić	(Bulgaria) Georgi Sarmov	(Germany) Fabian Ernst	(Sweden) Andreas Isaksson	(Uruguay) Tabaré Viudez		(Bulgaria) Nikolay Dimitrov (Nigeria) Kalu Uche (Uruguay) Pablo Pintos (Uruguay) Santiago García
Kayserispor	(Argentina) Pablo Mouche	(Brazil) Bobô	(Brazil) Cleyton	(Georgia (country)) Zurab Khizanishvili	(Iceland) Grétar Steinsson	(Montenegro) Marko Simić	(Netherlands) Diego Biseswar	(Paraguay) Cristian Riveros	(Argentina) Franco Cángele (Sweden) Emir Kujović
Mersin İdmanyurdu	(Argentina) Emmanuel Culio	(Brazil) Ivan	(Czech Republic) David Bičík	(Ivory Coast) Jean-Jacques Gosso	(Nigeria) Nduka Ozokwo	(Nigeria) Raheem Lawal	(Serbia) Milan Mitrović	(Serbia) Milan Stepanov	(Bosnia and Herzegovina) Ibrahim Šehić (Brazil) Danilo Bueno (Cameroon) Joseph Boum (Guinea) Ibrahim Yattara (Tunisia) Wissem Ben Yahia
Orduspor	(Argentina) Javier Umbides	(Nigeria) Ayila Yussuf	(Portugal) Miguel Garcia	(Romania) Bogdan Stancu	(Slovenia) Sašo Fornezzi	(Spain) Agus	(Spain) David Barral	(Spain) Jaime Romero	(Argentina) Vicente Monje (Brazil) Rovérsio
Sivasspor	(Bolivia) Ricardo Pedriel	(Canada) Milan Borjan	(Czech Republic) Jakub Navrátil	(Czech Republic) Jan Rajnoch	(Morocco) Aatif Chahechouhe	(Nigeria) Michael Eneramo	(Poland) Arkadiusz Piech	(Poland) Kamil Grosicki	(Czech Republic) Milan Černý (Senegal) Jacques Faty (Slovakia) Štefan Senecký
Trabzonspor	(Argentina) Gustavo Colman	(Brazil) Alanzinho	(Brazil) Emerson	(Ivory Coast) Didier Zokora	(Ivory Coast) Sol Bamba	(Poland) Adrian Mierzejewski	(Slovakia) Marek Čech	(Slovakia) Marek Sapara	(Austria) Marc Janko (Brazil) Paulo Henrique (Czech Republic) Ondřej Čelůstka (Slovakia) Róbert Vittek

== League table ==
Pos	Team	Pld	W	D	L	GF	GA	GD	Pts	Qualification or relegation
1	Galatasaray (C)	34	21	8	5	66	35	+31	71	Qualification for the Champions League group stage
2	Fenerbahçe	34	18	7	9	56	39	+17	61	Qualification for the Champions League third qualifying round
3	Beşiktaş	34	16	10	8	63	49	+14	58	Qualification for the Europa League play-off round
4	Bursaspor	34	14	13	7	52	41	+11	55	Qualification for the Europa League third qualifying round
5	Kayserispor	34	15	7	12	48	45	+3	52	
6	Kasımpaşa	34	14	8	12	48	37	+11	50	
7	Antalyaspor	34	14	5	15	50	52	−2	47	
8	Eskişehirspor	34	11	13	10	48	40	+8	46 (Note: Eskişehirspor were ahead of Trabzonspor and Gaziantepspor on head-to-head goal difference: Eskişehirspor: 6 pts, 7–3 (+4); Trabzonspor: 6 pts, 5–5 (0); Gaziantepspor: 6 pts, 4–8 (–4).)	
9	Trabzonspor	34	13	7	14	39	40	−1	46	Qualification for the Europa League second qualifying round (Note: Since the winners of the 2012–13 Turkish Cup, Fenerbahçe, qualified for European competition based on league position, the spot awarded to the cup winners (Europa League second qualifying round) was passed to the cup runners-up, Trabzonspor.)
10	Gaziantepspor	34	12	10	12	42	49	−7	46	
11	Gençlerbirliği	34	10	15	9	46	47	−1	45	
12	Sivasspor	34	12	8	14	42	46	−4	44	
13	Elazığspor	34	10	13	11	31	46	−15	43	
14	Akhisar Belediyespor	34	11	9	14	36	44	−8	42	
15	Kardemir Karabükspor	34	11	7	16	41	53	−12	40	
16	İstanbul B.B. (R)	34	9	9	16	43	50	−7	36	Relegation to TFF First League
17	Orduspor (R)	34	6	11	17	35	51	−16	29	Relegation to TFF First League
18	Mersin İdman Yurdu (R)	34	4	10	20	31	53	−22	22	Relegation to TFF First League

Rules for classification: 1) points; 2) goal difference; 3) number of goals scored.
(C) Champions; (R) Relegated

=== Positions by round ===
The following table represents the teams position after each round in the competition.

Team ╲ Round	1	2	3	4	5	6	7	8	9	10	11	12	13	14	15	16	17	18	19	20	21	22	23	24	25	26	27	28	29	30	31	32	33	34
Galatasaray	2	5	1	1	1	1	1	1	1	1	1	1	1	1	1	1	1	1	1	1	1	1	1	1	1	1	1	1	1	1	1	1	1	1
Fenerbahçe	6	1	5	4	3	6	5	6	8	6	3	4	2	4	2	3	4	4	3	4	3	2	2	3	3	2	2	2	2	2	2	2	2	2
Beşiktaş	6	12	4	3	5	10	11	12	10	7	8	5	4	3	3	2	2	2	2	3	2	3	3	2	2	3	3	3	3	3	3	3	3	3
Bursaspor	3	11	12	8	9	12	10	11	7	9	11	9	9	8	8	6	6	5	7	7	6	4	4	4	5	5	5	5	4	4	4	4	4	4
Kayserispor	15	17	17	16	15	17	15	15	17	14	12	13	14	14	13	12	15	15	13	13	12	9	8	7	7	9	9	9	6	7	8	6	5	5
Kasımpaşa	14	10	2	2	2	2	4	5	6	5	6	3	6	6	6	7	9	7	5	5	7	6	7	6	4	4	4	4	5	5	5	5	6	6
Antalyaspor	18	9	3	10	12	9	7	2	2	2	2	2	3	2	4	4	3	3	4	2	4	5	5	5	6	7	7	6	8	9	10	8	7	7
Eskişehirspor	15	16	13	9	10	8	9	7	4	3	4	7	5	5	5	5	5	8	6	6	5	7	6	8	8	8	8	7	9	10	9	10	10	8
Trabzonspor	6	2	10	7	7	7	6	8	10	10	9	6	7	7	7	8	7	9	11	9	10	12	10	10	11	13	12	12	10	8	7	9	8	9
Gaziantepspor	15	17	14	14	13	14	14	13	13	13	15	15	13	12	14	15	14	14	15	15	15	15	13	15	16	12	11	10	12	11	12	11	12	10
Gençlerbirliği	1	2	6	11	11	5	3	4	3	8	5	8	10	11	9	10	11	10	8	10	11	8	9	9	9	6	6	8	7	6	6	7	9	11
Sivasspor	3	6	8	12	8	4	8	9	11	11	10	11	8	9	10	13	10	11	12	11	8	10	11	12	10	11	10	11	11	12	11	13	11	12
Elazığspor	6	15	18	18	18	18	18	18	18	18	18	18	18	17	16	16	16	16	16	16	16	16	16	16	13	14	15	15	13	15	13	12	13	13
Akhisar Belediyespor	3	8	9	13	14	15	16	16	14	15	16	16	17	18	17	18	18	18	18	18	18	18	17	17	17	17	17	17	16	14	15	16	14	14
Kardemir Karabükspor	6	14	16	17	16	13	13	14	15	16	13	12	12	15	12	9	8	6	9	8	9	11	12	13	12	15	13	13	14	13	14	14	15	15
İstanbul B.B.	6	7	11	6	6	11	12	10	12	12	14	14	15	13	15	14	12	12	10	12	14	14	14	14	15	10	14	14	15	16	16	15	16	16
Orduspor	12	4	7	5	4	3	2	3	5	4	7	10	11	10	11	11	13	13	14	14	13	13	15	11	14	16	16	16	17	17	17	17	17	17
Mersin İdmanyurdu	12	13	15	15	17	16	17	17	16	17	17	17	16	16	18	17	17	17	17	17	17	17	18	18	18	18	18	18	18	18	18	18	18	18

Source: tff.org (in Turkish)

== Results ==
Home \ Away	AKH	ANT	BEŞ	BUR	ELZ	ESK	FEN	GAL	GAZ	GEN	İBB	KRB	KSM	KAY	MİY	ORD	SİV	TRA
Akhisar Belediyespor		1–0	4–1	2–2	0–1	1–1	1–2	1–2	0–0	0–0	0–4	1–3	0–2	1–2	1–0	0–0	2–1	1–0
Antalyaspor	4–3		3–5	0–1	4–0	2–1	1–2	0–4	5–2	3–5	1–0	0–0	3–2	3–0	1–0	1–0	4–2	2–1
Beşiktaş	3–1	1–0		3–3	3–0	2–2	3–2	3–3	1–1	3–0	2–2	2–2	1–3	3–1	3–0	2–0	0–1	1–1
Bursaspor	1–1	1–1	3–0		1–0	0–0	1–1	1–1	1–1	0–0	0–1	4–1	1–2	2–1	3–0	1–0	1–0	3–2
Elazığspor	0–0	2–1	1–3	1–1		1–1	1–1	0–1	0–0	1–1	1–0	1–0	0–3	0–4	1–0	1–0	0–0	3–1
Eskişehirspor	0–1	3–1	1–2	2–2	2–2		1–1	0–0	4–0	4–2	1–0	5–2	2–2	0–3	0–0	1–0	2–1	0–1
Fenerbahçe	2–0	1–3	3–0	4–1	2–2	1–0		2–1	3–0	4–1	2–1	1–3	3–1	2–1	2–1	2–1	1–2	0–0
Galatasaray	3–0	2–0	2–1	3–2	3–1	1–1	2–1		1–1	0–1	2–0	1–3	2–1	3–0	3–1	4–2	4–2	2–0
Gaziantepspor	2–2	0–1	3–2	2–1	1–1	2–0	1–2	0–1		2–3	2–1	0–2	2–1	0–1	2–1	3–0	0–1	1–0
Gençlerbirliği	1–0	3–1	1–1	2–2	1–2	0–2	2–0	3–3	2–2		0–0	2–1	0–0	4–0	3–1	1–1	1–1	0–4
İstanbul B.B.	0–2	0–1	1–1	4–1	1–1	2–2	2–0	1–3	1–3	0–2		2–2	1–2	0–0	4–2	1–1	2–0	2–1
Kardemir Karabükspor	0–2	1–0	0–3	0–3	0–1	0–0	3–2	0–1	0–2	0–0	3–1		0–3	3–1	1–0	1–1	1–0	1–1
Kasımpaşa	0–1	1–1	1–3	2–0	0–0	1–2	2–0	2–1	3–0	2–2	0–2	2–1		1–2	2–2	1–1	1–0	2–0
Kayserispor	1–1	2–0	2–0	0–1	4–1	3–2	1–1	1–3	1–1	1–0	0–1	3–0	1–0		2–1	0–0	1–1	2–1
Mersin İdmanyurdu	2–1	1–1	1–2	0–1	0–2	1–3	0–1	1–1	1–2	1–1	2–0	2–1	1–1	1–2		0–0	3–0	0–1
Orduspor	0–2	1–1	1–2	2–4	2–2	2–0	0–2	2–0	2–3	2–1	2–2	3–2	0–2	3–2	1–1		2–0	1–2
Sivasspor	1–2	2–1	0–1	2–2	3–1	1–0	0–0	1–3	0–0	1–1	4–1	2–1	1–0	4–2	3–3	3–2		2–0
Trabzonspor	3–1	2–0	0–0	0–1	2–0	0–3	0–3	0–0	4–1	2–0	4–3	1–3	1–0	1–1	1–1	1–0	1–0	

Source: tff.org (in Turkish)
Legend: Blue = home team win; Yellow = draw; Red = away team win.

== Statistics ==
=== Top goalscorers ===
Rank	Player	Club	Goals
1	(Turkey) Burak Yılmaz	Galatasaray	24
2	(Nigeria) Kalu Uche	Kasımpaşa	19
3	(Brazil) Bobô	Kayserispor	18
4	(Cameroon) Pierre Webó	İstanbul B.B. / Fenerbahçe	16
5	(Senegal) Moussa Sow	Fenerbahçe	15
5	(Argentina) Pablo Batalla	Bursaspor	15
7	(Senegal) Lamine Diarra	Antalyaspor	13
7	(Brazil) Mert Nobre	Mersin İdmanyurdu	13
9	(Greece) Theofanis Gekas	Akhisar Belediyespor	12
9	(Turkey) Umut Bulut	Galatasaray	12
9	(Turkey) Necati Ateş	Eskişehirspor	12

=== Top assists ===
Rank	Player	Club	Assists
1	(Argentina) Pablo Batalla	Bursaspor	17
2	(Portugal) Manuel Fernandes	Beşiktaş	12
2	(Turkey) Erman Kılıç	Sivasspor	12
4	(Netherlands) Dirk Kuyt	Fenerbahçe	11
5	(Chile) Rodrigo Tello	Eskişehirspor	10
6	(Turkey) Hurşut Meriç	Gençlerbirliği	9
6	(Morocco) Ismaïl Aissati	Antalyaspor	9
6	(Angola) Djalma Campos	Kasımpaşa	9
9	(Turkey) Burak Yılmaz	Galatasaray	8
9	(Senegal) Lamine Diarra	Antalyaspor	8
9	(Brazil) Cleyton	Kayserispor	8
9	(Bosnia and Herzegovina) Haris Medunjanin	Gaziantepspor	8
9	(Serbia) Duško Tošić	Gençlerbirliği	8
9	(Turkey) Aydın Karabulut	Elazığspor	8

=== Yellow cards ===
Rank	Player	Club	Yellow Cards
1	(Turkey) Salih Dursun	Kayserispor	14
2	(Turkey) Aykut Demir	Gençlerbirliği	13
3	(Turkey) Sedat Bayrak	Elazığspor	12
3	(Turkey) Yiğit İncedemir	Kardemir Karabükspor	12
5	(Turkey) Orhan Ak	Elazığspor	11
6	(Turkey) Veysel Sarı	Eskişehirspor	10
6	(Germany) Fabian Ernst	Kasımpaşa	10
6	(Turkey) Emre Güngör	Antalyaspor	10
6	(Portugal) Miguel Garcia	Orduspor	10
6	(Argentina) Emmanuel Culio	Mersin İdmanyurdu	10

=== Red cards ===
Rank	Player	Club	Red Cards
1	(Turkey) Sedat Bayrak	Elazığspor	3
2	(Netherlands) Marvin Zeegelaar	Elazığspor	2
2	(Turkey) Sancak Kaplan	Kasımpaşa	2
2	(Brazil) Felipe Melo	Galatasaray	2

=== Hat-tricks ===
Player	For	Against	Result	Date
(Nigeria) Kalu Uche	Kasımpaşa	Sanica Boru Elazığspor	3–0	1 September 2012
(Cameroon) Pierre Webó	İstanbul BB	Akhisar Belediyespor	4–0	16 September 2012
(Portugal) Hugo Almeida	Beşiktaş	MP Antalyaspor	5–3	18 November 2012
(Belgium) Björn Vleminckx	Gençlerbirliği	MP Antalyaspor	5–3	20 January 2013
(Nigeria) Michael Eneramo	Sivasspor	İstanbul BB	4–1	27 April 2013

== Awards ==
Team of the Season
Goalkeeper	(Uruguay) Fernando Muslera (Galatasaray)			
Defenders	(Turkey) Gökhan Gönül (Fenerbahçe)	(Turkey) Semih Kaya (Galatasaray)	(Nigeria) Joseph Yobo (Fenerbahçe)	(Spain) Albert Riera (Galatasaray)
Midfielders	(Turkey) Selçuk İnan (Galatasaray)	(Brazil) Felipe Melo (Galatasaray)	(Netherlands) Dirk Kuyt (Fenerbahçe)	(Turkey) Olcay Şahan (Beşiktaş)
Forwards	(Turkey) Burak Yılmaz (Galatasaray)	(Senegal) Moussa Sow (Fenerbahçe)		
