= Burak Can Kalender =

Turkish footballer

Personal information
- Full name: Burak Can Kalender
- Date of birth: 24 June 1995 (age 31)
- Place of birth: Seyhan, Turkey
- Position: Attacking midfielder

Team information
- Current team: Gönen Belediyespor

Youth career
- Kuvayi Milliyespor
- Adana Demirspor
- Mersin İdmanyurdu

Senior career*
Years	Team	Apps	(Gls)
2013–2014	Mersin İdmanyurdu	1	(0)
2014	Tarsus Idman Yurdu	3	(0)
2014–2015	Manavgatspor		
2015–2016	Silivrispor	1	(0)
2016–	Gönen Belediyespor	28	(2)
- * Club domestic league appearances and goals as of 28 December 2016 (UTC)

Burak Can Kalender (born 24 June 1995) is a Turkish footballer who plays as a midfielder for Gönen Belediyespor. He made his Süper Lig debut on 17 May 2013.
