= Hakan Bayraktar =

Turkish footballer

Personal information
- Full name: Hakan Bayraktar
- Date of birth: 11 February 1976 (age 50)
- Place of birth: Samsun, Turkey
- Height: 1.83 m (6 ft 0 in)
- Position: Midfielder

Senior career*
| Years | Team | Apps | (Gls) |
| 1995–1997 | KFC Lommelse SK | 5 | (0) |
| 1997–2001 | Gaziantepspor | 79 | (2) |
| 2001–2003 | Fenerbahçe | 51 | (1) |
| 2004 | Gaziantepspor | 9 | (0) |
| 2004–2005 | Akçaabat Sebatspor | 28 | (0) |
| 2005–2006 | Sivasspor | 44 | (1) |
| 2007 | Malatyaspor | 16 | (0) |
| 2008 | Diyarbakirspor | 26 | (1) |
| 2008–2010 | Gaziantepspor | 39 | (2) |
| 2010–2011 | Samsunspor | 29 | (0) |
| 2011–2013 | Mersin İdmanyurdu | 49 | (0) |
| 2013–2014 | Karşıyaka SK | 4 | (0) |
| 2014–2015 | Lommel Kolonie | ? | (?) |
- KWB Kartoes

International career
| 2003 | Turkey A2 | 1 | (0) |
| 2001 | Turkey | 1 | (0) |
- * Club domestic league appearances and goals

Hakan Bayraktar (born 11 February 1976 in Samsun, Turkey) is a Turkish retired association football midfielder.

He started his professional career in the 1994–95 season, playing for K.F.C. Lommel S.K. in Belgium. He joined Gaziantepspor in 1997, and Fenerbahce in 2001. He also played for Çaykur Rizespor and Samsunspor. In the 2003–04 season, he only played one game and returned to Gaziantepspor for the remainder of the season. In 2004, he joined Akçaabat Sebatspor, playing one season before joining Sivasspor. He joined Malatyaspor in 2007. After a quite good season for the second league team Diyarbakirspor, Bayraktar signed for his former team Gaziantepspor once again. He returned to Belgium to play in the amateur leagues.

He has been capped for Turkey.
