= Can Erdem =

Turkish footballer

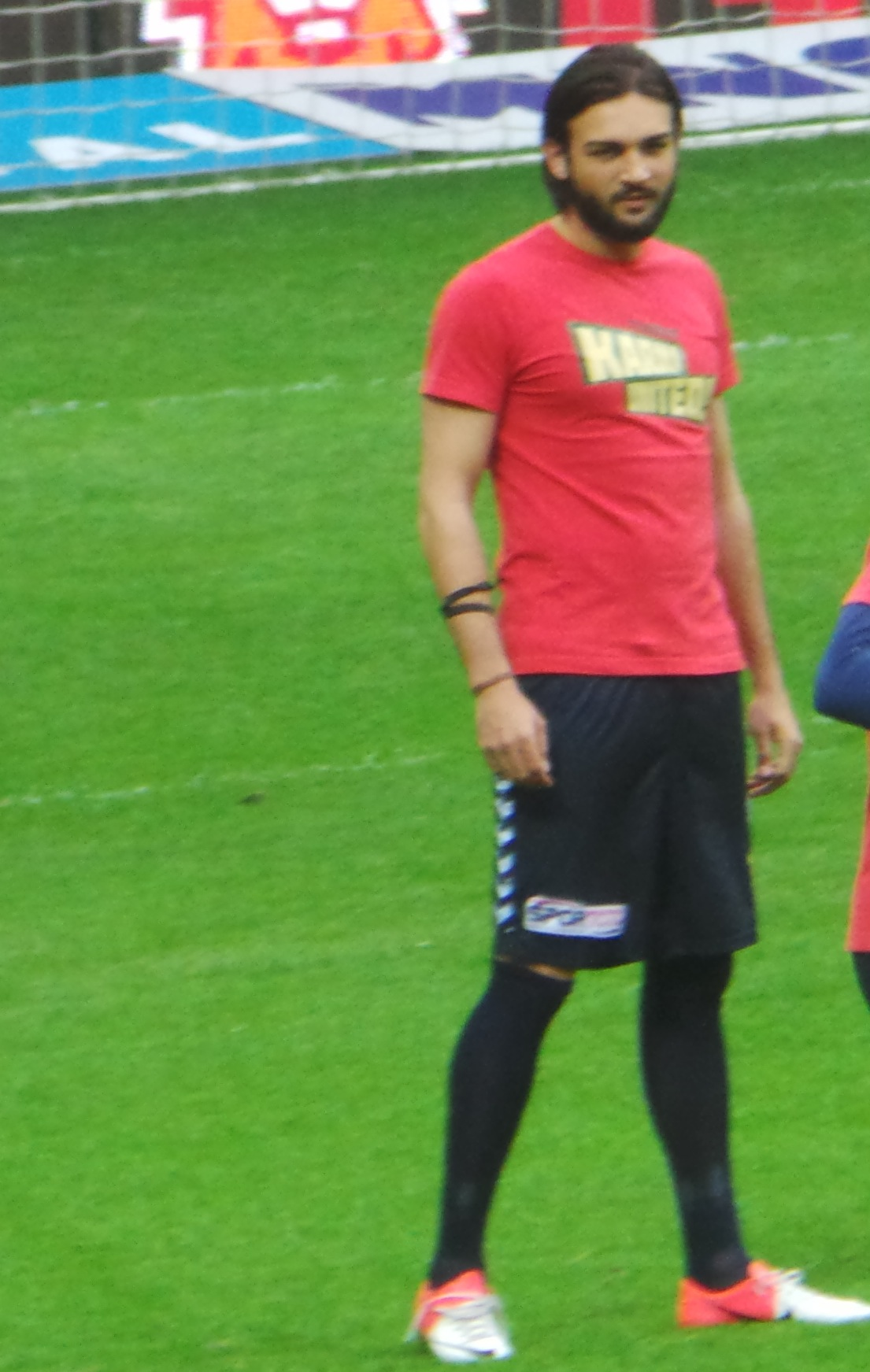
- Erdem in 2013

Personal information
- Date of birth: 8 June 1987 (age 39)
- Place of birth: Istanbul, Turkey
- Height: 1.88 m (6 ft 2 in)
- Position: Forward

Team information
- Current team: Kırşehir Belediyespor

Youth career
- 2001–2005: Alanya Belediye
- 2005–2006: Beşiktaş

Senior career*
Years	Team	Apps	(Gls)
2007–2010	Beşiktaş	3	(0)
2007–2008	→ Kocaelispor (loan)	25	(5)
2008–2009	→ Altay (loan)	25	(3)
2009–2010	→ Siirtspor (loan)	12	(3)
2010–2013	Denizlispor	45	(8)
2012	→ Turgutluspor (loan)	19	(12)
2013	Mersin İdmanyurdu	4	(1)
2013–2014	Osmanlıspor	7	(1)
2014–2015	Karşıyaka	36	(13)
2015	Sarıyer	10	(6)
2016–2018	Karşıyaka	58	(27)
2018–2019	Şanlıurfaspor	30	(15)
2019–2020	Sancaktepe	24	(7)
2020–	Kırşehir Belediyespor	0	(0)

International career
2007	Turkey U21	1	(0)
- * Club domestic league appearances and goals as of 24 July 2020

Can Erdem (born 8 June 1987 in Istanbul) is a Turkish footballer who currently plays as a striker for Kırşehir Belediyespor.

== Career ==
Erdem had begun his career at a local club, Alanya Belediyespor, based in Antalya. He was trained there until 2005 before joining Beşiktaş. After a short spell, he was promoted to senior squad by French manager Jean Tigana in 2006. Erdem then joined Kocaelispor on loan in the 2007–08 season. At the end of the season, Kocaelispor was promoted to the Süper Lig.

In the 2008–09 season, he returned to Beşiktaş and began to train with the senior squad again, under manager Ertuğrul Sağlam. However, he was loaned out to İzmir club Altay.

== Honours ==
=== Club ===
Beşiktaş

- Turkish Cup: 2006–07

Kocaelispor

- Bank Asya 1. Lig: 2007–08
