= Ömer Aysan Barış =

Turkish footballer (born 1982)

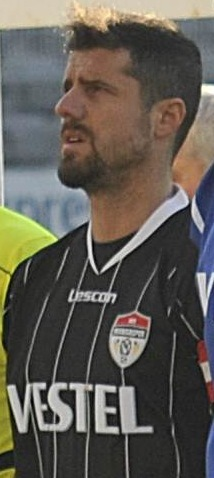
- Aysan with Manisaspor

Personal information
- Date of birth: 23 July 1982 (age 44)
- Place of birth: İzmit, Turkey
- Height: 1.75 m (5 ft 9 in)
- Positions: Right back; midfielder

Youth career
- 1998–1999: Gölcükspor
- 1999–2002: Kocaelispor

Senior career*
| Years | Team | Apps | (Gls) |
| 1998–1999 | Gölcükspor | 1 | (0) |
| 2000–2005 | Kocaelispor | 86 | (3) |
| 2005–2008 | Bursaspor | 64 | (3) |
| 2008–2009 | Ankaraspor | 14 | (0) |
| 2009–2010 | Trabzonspor | 14 | (0) |
| 2010–2012 | Manisaspor | 42 | (2) |
| 2012–2013 | Mersin İdmanyurdu | 7 | (1) |
| 2014 | Şanlıurfaspor | 1 | (0) |
- * Club domestic league appearances and goals

Ömer Aysan Barış (born 23 July 1982) is a Turkish former professional footballer who played as a midfielder.

== Early life ==
Born in 1982, Aysan was born and raised in Kocaeli, where he started playing football, before enrolling in a Kocaeli football school and joining the youth academy of Gölcükspor, where he started his senior career. As a teenager, he experienced the 1999 İzmit earthquake, which caused him and his family to temporarily live in tents.

== Club career ==
After playing for Gölcükspor, Aysan joined the youth academy of Kocaelispor, before signing a professional contract with the club in 2000 and going on to play for them for five seasons. He debuted for Kocaelispor on 22 December 2000. He helped Kocaelispor win the 2002 Turkish Cup.

In 2005, he signed for Bursaspor, where he became sidelined due to injury for a period of time at the start of the 2006–07 season before becoming an important part of the team shortly after returning. In 2008, he signed for Ankaraspor, where he made fourteen league appearances throughout two seasons. However, he left Ankaraspor after the club was expelled from the Turkish top flight by The Professional Football Disciplinary Committee.

In 2009, he signed for Trabzonspor on a three-year contract. However, a year later, he left Trabzonspor after arguing with a club official.

In 2010, he signed for Manisaspor, where he became involved in controversy after being accused of sexist behavior towards women in attendance during a game he was playing against Fenerbahçe. He played for Manisaspor for two seasons. In September 2011 he played in a match at Fenerbahçe before 41,000 women and children after Fenerbahçe were sanctioned an men were banned from the stadium. He was quoted internationally as saying “It was such a fun and pleasant atmosphere”. In 2012, he signed for Mersin İdmanyurdu before ending his professional playing career with Şanlıurfaspor.

== International career ==
During the beginning of the 2000s, Aysan was considered to get called up to the Turkey national team but he never made an appearance for them.

== Style of play ==
Aysan mainly operated as a full-back and was known for his ability to help his team during their attacking phases. At the beginning of his career, he was mainly deployed as a left-back before he started being deployed more as a right-back as his career progressed.

== Personal life ==
Aysan married Ayça Karasu in 2021, where he was given a plaque by the mayor of for his performances for Kocaelispor, where he played for five years.

== Honours ==
Kocaelispor

- Turkish Cup: 2002
