= Volkan Yılmaz =

Turkish footballer (born 1987)

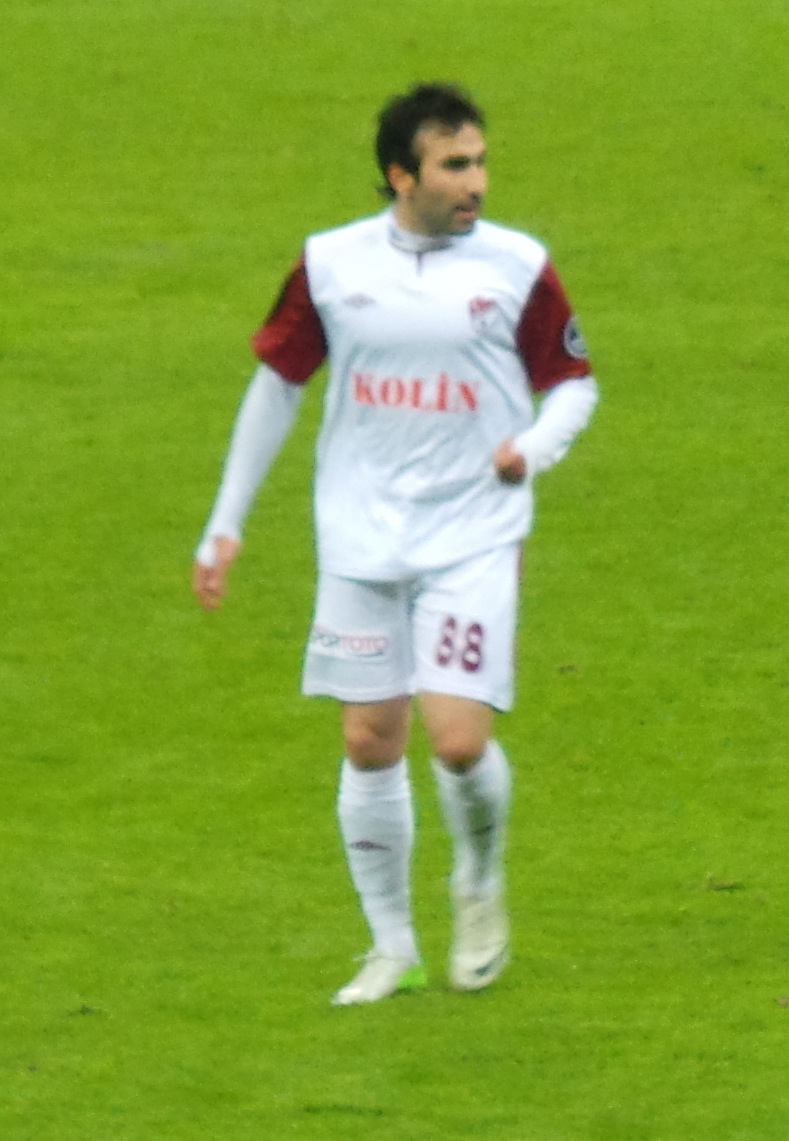
- Volkan Yılmaz in 2013.

Personal information
- Full name: Volkan Yılmaz
- Date of birth: 1 September 1987 (age 39)
- Place of birth: Bakırköy, Turkey
- Height: 1.71 m (5 ft 7 in)
- Position: Forward

Team information
- Current team: Kartal
- Number: 11

Youth career
- 1999–2001: Ceditılıcaspor
- 2001–2004: Samsunspor

Senior career*
Years	Team	Apps	(Gls)
2004–2006	Samsunspor	2	(0)
2006	→ Akçaabat Sebatspor (loan)	0	(0)
2006–2009	İstanbulspor	25	(3)
2009	Gaziosmanpaşaspor	6	(0)
2010	Mardinspor	11	(0)
2010–2011	Diyarbakırspor	12	(0)
2011–2013	Gaziantep BB	28	(3)
2013–2014	Elazığspor	2	(0)
2014	MKE Ankaragücü	11	(3)
2014–2015	Kocaeli Birlik Spor	10	(1)
2015	Bandırmaspor	9	(0)
2015–2016	Sakaryaspor	31	(3)
2016–	Kartal	12	(2)

International career
2005	Turkey U19	3	(0)
- * Club domestic league appearances and goals

Volkan Yılmaz (born 1 September 1987) is a Turkish footballer who plays as a forward for Kartal. He made his Süper Lig debut on 14 April 2013.
