= Ergin Keleş =

Turkish footballer

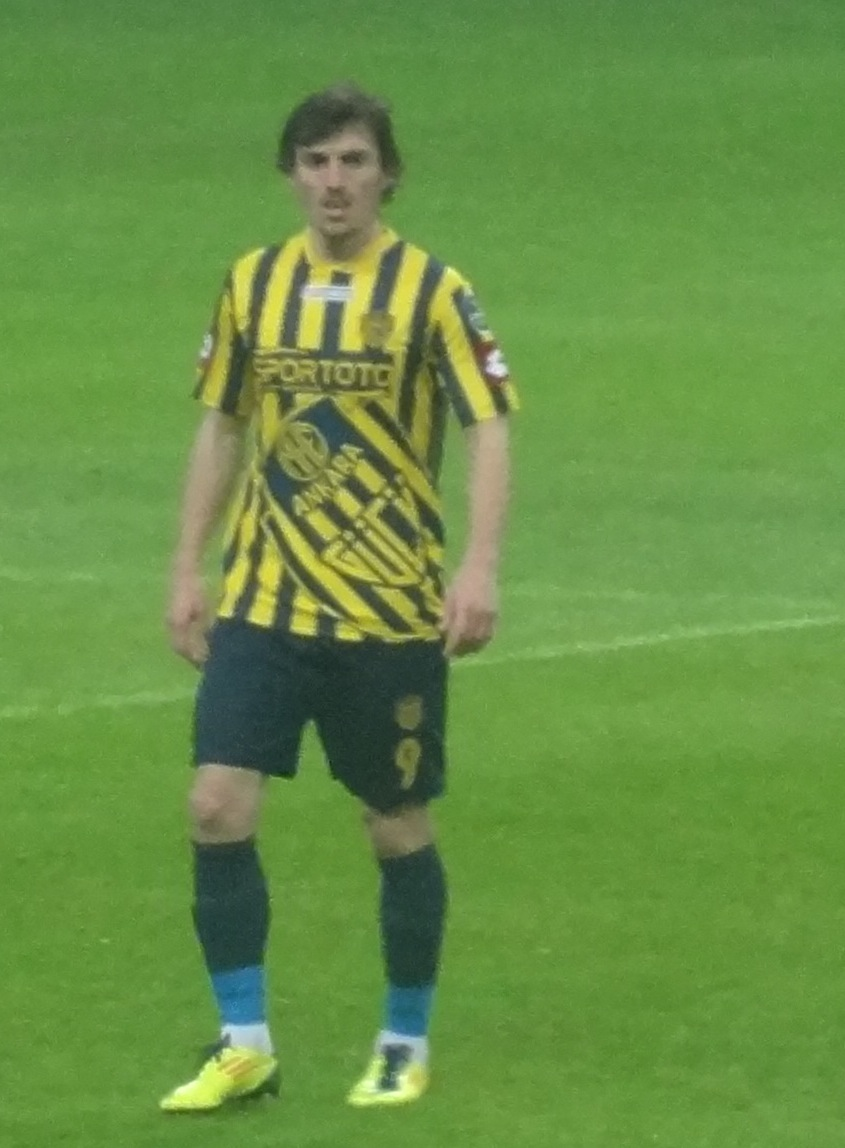

Personal information
- Date of birth: 1 January 1987 (age 39)
- Place of birth: Trabzon, Turkey
- Height: 1.84 m (6 ft 0 in)
- Position: Forward

Team information
- Current team: Afjet Afyonspor
- Number: 12

Youth career
- 1999–2002: Trabzonspor

Senior career*
Years	Team	Apps	(Gls)
2002–2009	Trabzonspor	26	(1)
2005–2006	→ Akçaabat Sebatspor (loan)	15	(2)
2006–2007	→ Sakaryaspor (loan)	19	(2)
2009–2011	Manisaspor	31	(5)
2011–2012	Ankaragücü	14	(4)
2012	Karabükspor	6	(0)
2012–2013	Mersin İdmanyurdu	11	(0)
2013	Göztepe	14	(6)
2013–2015	Adanaspor	42	(13)
2015	Gaziantep BB	19	(3)
2015–2016	Adanaspor	23	(10)
2016–2018	Sivasspor	34	(5)
2018	Karabükspor	14	(1)
2019	Giresunspor	8	(0)
2019–2020	Akhisarspor	22	(3)
2020	Altay	2	(0)
2020–2021	Adanaspor	24	(5)
2021–2022	Ankara Demirspor	29	(13)
2022–2023	Kastamonuspor 1966	35	(15)
2023–	Afjet Afyonspor	4	(2)

International career
2002	Turkey U16	10	(6)
2003–2004	Turkey U17	27	(13)
2003–2005	Turkey U18	9	(9)
2004–2006	Turkey U19	12	(2)
2005	Turkey U20	4	(0)
2006–2007	Turkey U21	6	(3)
- * Club domestic league appearances and goals as of 23 September 2023

Ergin Keleş (born 1 January 1987) is a Turkish professional footballer who plays for Afjet Afyonspor.

== Career ==
Keleş started his footballing career with local club Trabzonspor in 1999. The Black Sea club kept Keleş on the books for ten years, where Keleş spent most of his time with the youth teams. He spent time on loan with Akçaabat Sebatspor and Sakaryaspor before being transferred to Manisaspor. He joined MKE Ankaragücü in January 2011. Then he moved to Kardemir Karabükspor on 31 January 2012.

He returned to Adanaspor in 2020.
