= Özden Öngün =

Turkish footballer

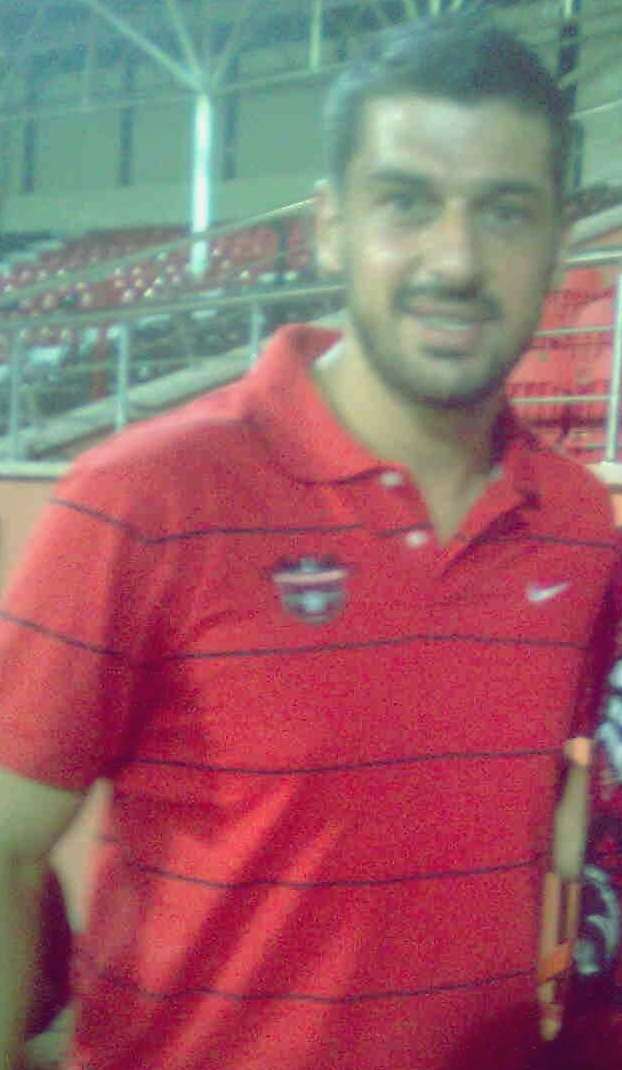

Personal information
- Full name: Özden Öngün
- Date of birth: 10 September 1978 (age 48)
- Place of birth: İzmit, Turkey
- Height: 1.87 m (6 ft 2 in)
- Position: Goalkeeper

Team information
- Current team: Fenerbahçe (goalkeeper coach)

Youth career
- Kocaelispor

Senior career*
Years	Team	Apps	(Gls)
1997–1998	Sakaryaspor	24	(0)
1998–1999	Kartalspor	18	(0)
1999–2001	Kocaelispor	5	(0)
2001–2003	Kayserispor	49	(0)
2003–2007	Konyaspor	97	(0)
2007–2008	Çaykur Rizespor	4	(0)
2008–2010	Denizlispor	30	(0)
2010–2011	MKE Ankaragücü	32	(0)
2012	Gaziantepspor	3	(0)
2012–2013	Mersin İdmanyurdu	3	(0)
2013–2014	Gaziantepspor	1	(0)

International career
1998	Turkey	1	(0)

Managerial career
- 2017: Gaziantepspor (goalkeeping coach)
- 2017: Osmanlıspor (goalkeeping coach)
- 2018: Sivasspor (goalkeeping coach)
- 2019: Göztepe (goalkeeping coach)
- 2020: Antalyaspor (goalkeeping coach)
- 2021: Antalyaspor (goalkeeping coach)
- 2021–2022: İstanbul Başakşehir (goalkeeping coach)
- 2022–2023: Fenerbahçe (goalkeeping coach)
- 2023: İstanbul Başakşehir (goalkeeping coach)
- * Club domestic league appearances and goals

Özden Öngün (born 10 September 1978) is a Turkish goalkeeping coach of Turkish Süper Lig club Fenerbahçe and retired international footballer who played as a goalkeeper.

He has one international cap for Turkey. He has also played for Konyaspor, Kocaelispor, Sakaryaspor, Kartalspor, Kayserispor, MKE Ankaragücü and Mersin İdmanyurdu SK.

Öngün is married to Turkish Cypriot model Korla.
