= Joseph Boum =

Cameroonian footballer (1989–2024)

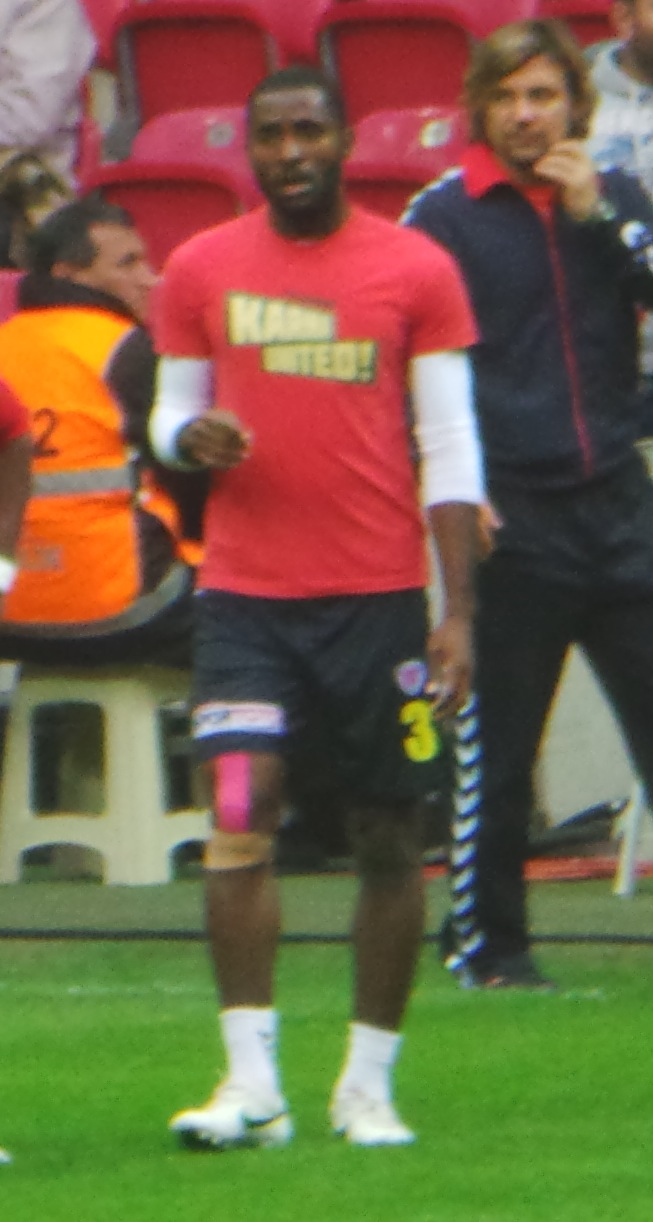
- Boum with Mersin İdmanyurdu in 2013

Personal information
- Date of birth: 26 September 1989
- Place of birth: Yaounde, Cameroon
- Date of death: April 2024 (aged 34)
- Height: 1.86 m (6 ft 1 in)
- Position: Centre-back

Senior career*
Years	Team	Apps	(Gls)
2009–2014	Mersin İdmanyurdu	78	(0)
2014–2015	Antalyaspor	19	(0)
2017–2018	Zira	17	(0)
Total		114	(0)
- * Club domestic league appearances and goals

Joseph Boum (26 September 1989 – April 2024) was a Cameroonian professional footballer who played as a centre-back. He died in April 2024, aged 34. His death was announced by his former club Antalyaspor on 15 April 2024.

== Career statistics ==
Appearances and goals by club, season and competition
Club	Season	League			National cup		Continental		Other		Total	
Club	Season	Division	Apps	Goals	Apps	Goals	Apps	Goals	Apps	Goals	Apps	Goals
Mersin İdmanyurdu	2009–10	TFF First League	10	0	0	0	–		–		14	0
Mersin İdmanyurdu	2010–11	TFF First League	23	0	1	0	–		–		10	0
Mersin İdmanyurdu	2011–12	Süper Lig	29	0	1	0	–		–		30	0
Mersin İdmanyurdu	2012–13	Süper Lig	16	0	2	0	–		–		18	0
Mersin İdmanyurdu	2013–14	TFF First League	0	0	0	0	–		–		0	0
Mersin İdmanyurdu	Total		78	0	4	0	0	0	0	0	82	0
Antalyaspor	2013–14	Süper Lig	10	0	4	0	–		–		14	0
Antalyaspor	2014–15	TFF First League	9	0	1	0	–		–		10	0
Antalyaspor	Total		19	0	5	0	0	0	0	0	24	0
Zira	2017–18	Azerbaijan Premier League	17	0	0	0	4	0	–		21	0
Career total			114	0	9	0	4	0	0	0	127	0
