= Tanju Kayhan =

Austrian footballer (born 1989)

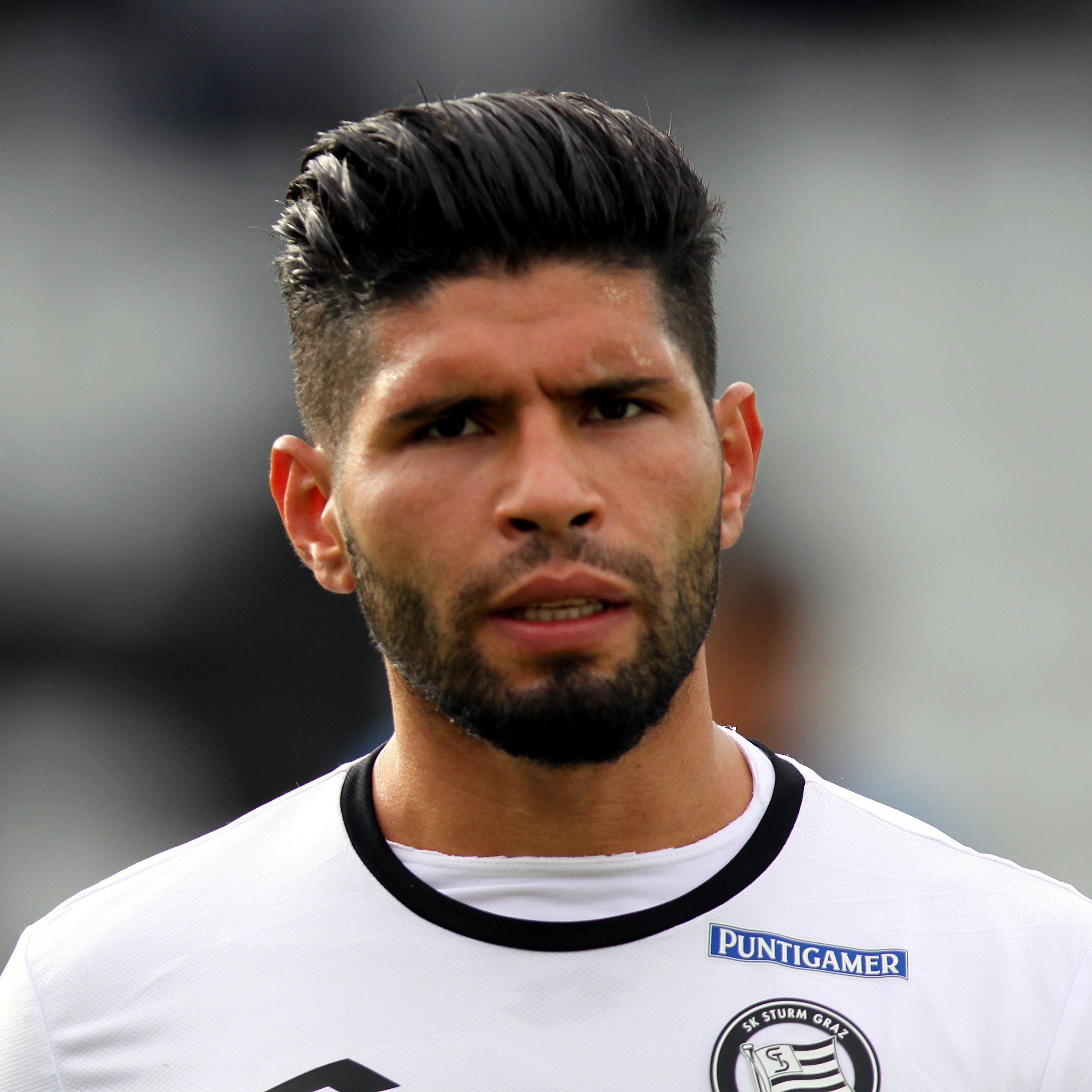
- Kayhan with SK Sturm Graz in 2015

Personal information
- Date of birth: 22 July 1989 (age 37)
- Place of birth: Vienna, Austria
- Height: 1.72 m (5 ft 8 in)
- Positions: Defender; full back

Team information
- Current team: Admira Wacker (U16 assistant)

Youth career
- 2002–2007: Rapid Wien

Senior career*
Years	Team	Apps	(Gls)
2007–2009	Rapid Wien II	28	(1)
2009–2010	Rapid Wien	36	(0)
2010	→ Wiener Neustadt (loan)	18	(0)
2011–2014	Beşiktaş	10	(0)
2012–2013	→ Mersin İdmanyurdu (loan)	11	(0)
2013	→ Eskişehirspor (loan)	1	(0)
2014	→ Elazığspor (loan)	15	(0)
2014–2015	Karabükspor	27	(0)
2015–2016	Sturm Graz	16	(0)
2016–2018	Göztepe	32	(0)
2018–2020	Adana Demirspor	0	(0)
2022	SV Hundsheim	7	(5)
2024	SC Ostbahn XI	1	(0)

International career
2009	Austria U21	1	(0)

Managerial career
- 2023–: Admira Wacker (U16 assistant)
- * Club domestic league appearances and goals

Tanju Kayhan (born 22 July 1989 in Vienna, Austria) is a retired Austrian footballer.

== Club career ==
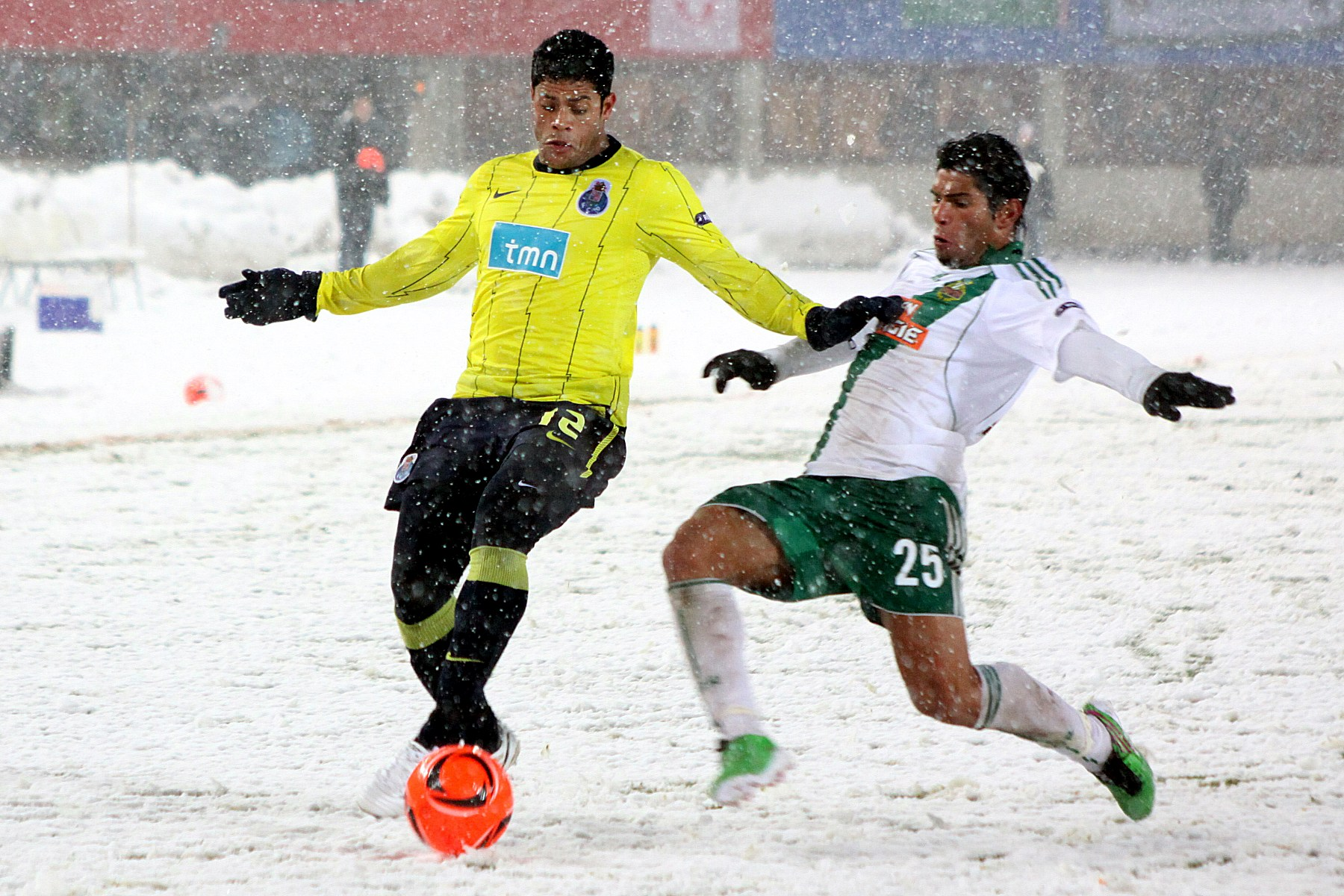
Hulk of F.C. Porto fighting Kayhan for the ball in an UEFA Europa League match in 2010.

Kayhan began his career 1999 with Rapid Wien Amateur and was promoted to the first team in November 2008 from and made his debut on 15 November 2008 against LASK Linz. On 30 January 2010 left SK Rapid Wien on loan to SC Wiener Neustadt, he will return on 30 June 2010. He signed a two-year deal with Göztepe SK in June 2016.

On 30 August 2018, he has signed 2-year contract with Adana Demirspor. However, due to an anterior cruciate ligament injury a week after his arrival, he never played an official game for the club, before leaving the club in March 2020. In May 2020, Kayhan was also operated for a articular cartilage damage.

=== Later career ===
In February 2021, Kayhan returned to Austria when he signed with SV Stripfing. However, he was injured with an anterior cruciate ligament injury and was therefore, at the time of the announcement, not fit to play or train at all. He later also revealed, that he never signed a specific agreement with the club and he never really appeared on the teamlist for them.

From February 2022 until the end of the season, Kayhan played for SV Hundsheim alongside his brother, Coskun, scoring five goals in seven league games.

In January 2023, Kayhan started as an assistant coach for Admira Wacker's U-16 team. At the same time, around August 2024, Kayhan also played a single league game for SC Ostbahn XI, as well as a few friendlies; a club that his brother, Coskun, was managing at the time.

== International career ==
He received his first call-up for Austria in winter 2008–2009 but only made his debut against Italy national under-21 football team on 11 February 2009.

== Personal life ==
Kayhan was born to Turkish parents. He has three brothers who plays football Coskun played for SC Zwettl, Ercan for ASC Götzendorf and Orhan Kayhan for SVR Wolfersberg. He also holds Turkish citizenship.

Kayhan later began a career as a personal football coach. He and his brother Coskun Kayhan founded Football-CTK.
