= Mert Can =

Turkish footballer

Personal information
- Full name: Mert Can
- Date of birth: 9 October 1993 (age 33)
- Place of birth: Mersin, Turkey
- Position: Centre-back

Team information
- Current team: Mersin İdman Yurdu
- Number: 93

Youth career
- 2007–2012: Mersin İdman Yurdu

Senior career*
Years	Team	Apps	(Gls)
2012–	Mersin İdman Yurdu	1	(0)
- * Club domestic league appearances and goals

Mert Can (born 9 October 1993) is a Turkish footballer who plays as a centre-back for Mersin İdman Yurdu. He made his Süper Lig debut on 13 April 2013.
