= Giray Bulak =

Turkish football coach

Personal information
- Date of birth: March 9, 1958 (age 68)
- Place of birth: Trabzon, Turkey

Youth career
- Balıkesirspor

Senior career*
| Years | Team | Apps | (Gls) |
- Balıkesirspor

Managerial career
- 1991-1993: Trabzonspor (Assistant Coach)
- 1993-1994: Çaykur Rizespor
- 1994-1996: Zonguldakspor
- 1996-1997: Kardemir Karabükspor
- 1997: Vanspor
- 1997-1998: Göztepe
- 1998-1999: Sakaryaspor
- 1999: Konyaspor
- 2000-2002: Trabzonspor
- 2002: Antalyaspor
- 2002-2003: Elazığspor
- 2003-2005: Denizlispor
- 2006: Ankaraspor
- 2006-2007: Sakaryaspor
- 2007-2008: Manisaspor
- 2008-2009: Konyaspor
- 2011-2012: Çaykur Rizespor
- 2012: Trabzonspor (Gen. Manager)
- 2012-2013: Mersin Talim Yurdu
- 2017: Adana Demirspor
- 2018-2019: Balıkesirspor
- 2019: Boluspor
- 2019: Fatih Karagümrük
- 2021-2022: Balıkesirspor
- 2022-2023: Denizlispor
- * Club domestic league appearances and goals as of 23 September 2024

Giray Bulak (born 9 March 1958 in Trabzon, Turkey) is a football coach who was most recently the manager of Denizlispor and a former Turkish football player.

== Playing career ==
Bulak was trained in Balıkesirspor's youth academy. His playing career was short-lived, and after playing for a few seasons at Balıkesirspor, he obtained his coaching license.

== Coaching career ==
Bulak began an assistant coach at Trabzonspor under Georges Leekens. In 1993, he became the head coach of Çaykur Rizespor.

During the 1996-97 season, he led Kardemir Karabükspor to win the 1. Lig championship, promoting the team to the Süper Lig. He then went on to coach several teams, including Vanspor, Göztepe, Sakaryaspor, Konyaspor, Trabzonspor, Antalyaspor, Elazığspor, Denizlispor, Ankaraspor, and Vestel Manisaspor.

In the 2008-2009 season, Bulak returned as the head coach of Konyaspor. Taking charge in the 5th week of the Süper Lig, he managed 28 matches, recording 14 losses, 7 wins, and 7 draws. In May 2009, the club parted ways with him.

=== 2010s ===
For the 2011-12 season, he reached an agreement with Gençlerbirliği. However, two weeks after signing, he terminated his contract by mutual consent due to disagreements with the management over transfers.

On February 17, 2012, he signed a 1.5-year contract with Çaykur Rizespor. In June of the same year, he left the club of his own accord.

At the start of the 2012-13 season, he was appointed as General Manager of Trabzonspor. On December 20, 2012, he signed a contract with Mersin İdman Yurdu and became the head coach.

In June 2017, Bulak signed a one-year contract with Adana Demirspor, taking over as head coach. He resigned in October of the same year. Bulak then managed Balıkesirspor during the 2018-19 season.

In June 2019, Bulak signed a one-year contract with Boluspor. After the first four weeks of the 1. Lig season, where the club managed to earn only one point, the Boluspor management held discussions, and the two parties mutually agreed to part ways.

Between November and December 2019, Bulak took charge of Fatih Karagümrük, leading the team in 7 matches—5 in the league and 2 in the cup. During these 7 matches, he only secured one victory, defeating Boluspor 2-0, while losing 5 matches and drawing 1.

=== 2020s ===
In the 2021-22 season, he once again became the head coach of Balıkesirspor. In April 2022, the club mutually agreed to part ways with him.

On November 1, 2022, Denizlispor signed a 1.5-year contract with Bulak. On March 25, 2023, following a 2-1 home loss to Boluspor in the 28th week of the 1. Lig, the club and Bulak parted ways by mutual agreement. Under his management, Denizlispor played 17 official matches, 16 in the 1. Lig and 1 in the Turkish Cup, securing 5 wins, 3 draws, and 9 losses overall.
