= David Bičík =

Czech footballer

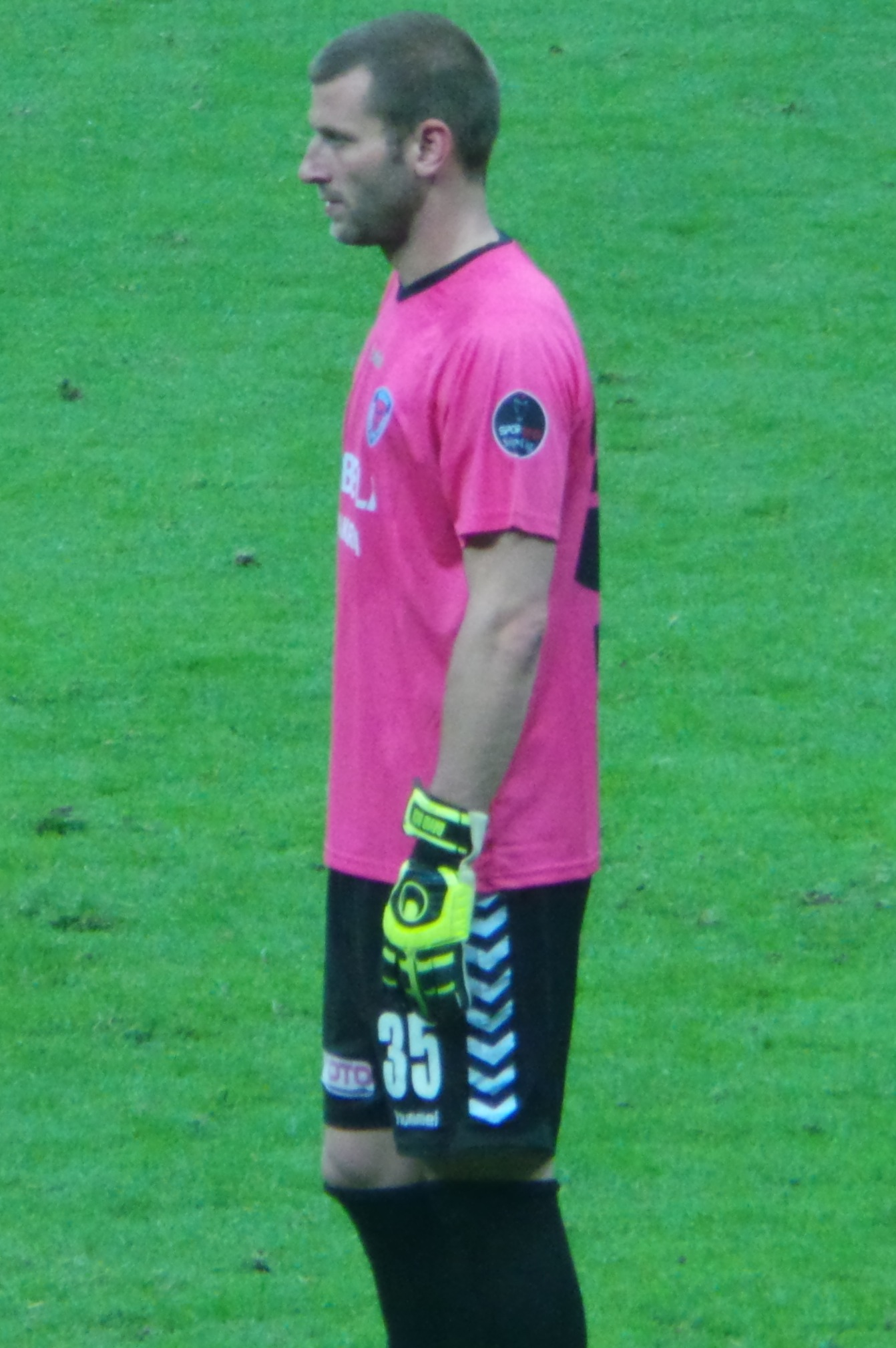

Personal information
- Full name: David Bičík
- Date of birth: 6 April 1981 (age 45)
- Place of birth: Prague, Czechoslovakia
- Height: 1.94 m (6 ft 4 in)
- Position: Goalkeeper

Senior career*
Years	Team	Apps	(Gls)
2000–2007	Sparta Prague	4	(0)
2006	→ Viktoria Plzeň (loan)	3	(0)
2006–2007	→ Kladno (loan)	7	(0)
2008–2010	Slovan Bratislava	21	(0)
2010–2012	Slovan Liberec	74	(0)
2013	Mersin İdmanyurdu	11	(0)
2013–2014	Karşıyaka	18	(0)
2014–2020	Sparta Prague	48	(0)

International career
1999	Czech Republic U20	3	(0)
- * Club domestic league appearances and goals

David Bičík (born 6 April 1981) is a former Czech football goalkeeper. He lastly played for Sparta Prague.
