= Nduka Ozokwo =

Nigerian footballer

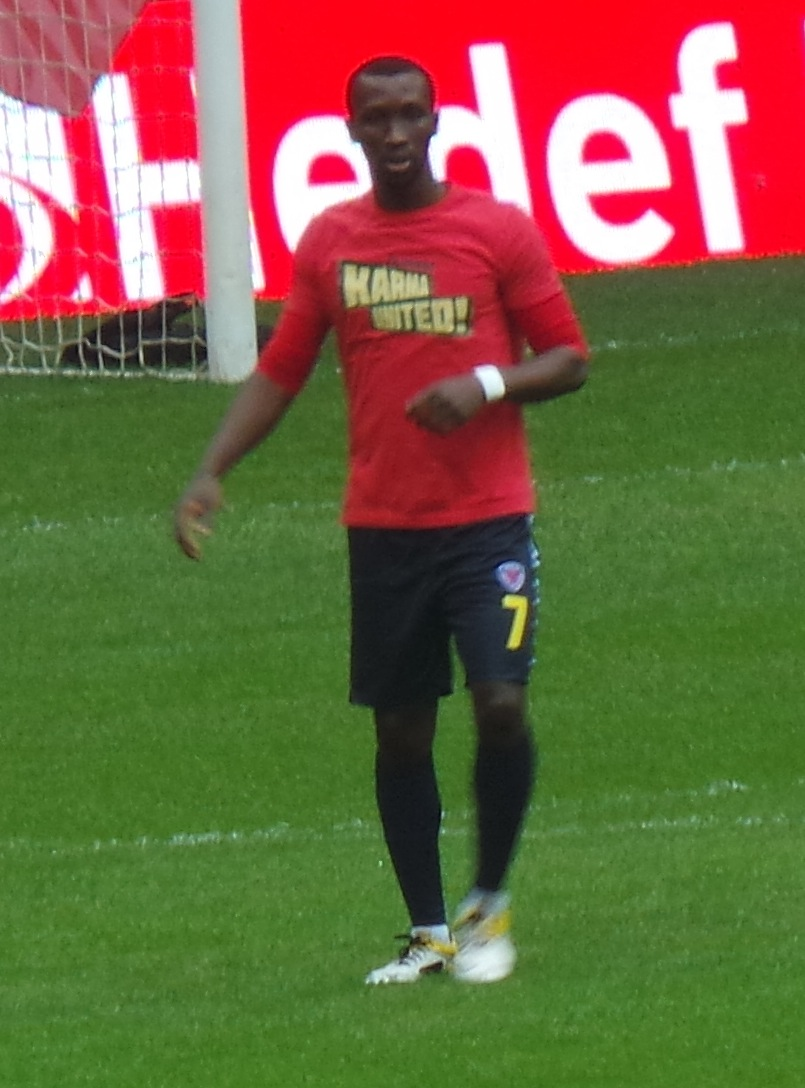

Personal information
- Full name: Nduka Morrisson Ozokwo
- Date of birth: 25 December 1988 (age 37)
- Place of birth: Enugu, Nigeria
- Height: 1.80 m (5 ft 11 in)
- Position: Attacking midfielder

Senior career*
Years	Team	Apps	(Gls)
2006–2007	Enugu Rangers	11	(0)
2007–2009	Nice	2	(0)
2009	Enugu Rangers	5	(0)
2010	Boluspor	14	(0)
2011–2014	Mersin İdmanyurdu	104	(9)
2014–2016	Adanaspor	45	(7)
2016–2017	FC Wil	18	(3)
2017–2019	Ankaragücü	2	(0)
2020	Ankaragücü	2	(0)

International career
2007	Nigeria U20	4	(0)
- * Club domestic league appearances and goals as of 18:35, 2 January 2021 (UTC)

Nduka Morrisson Ozokwo (born 25 December 1988) is a Nigerian former footballer.

== Club career ==
Born in Enugu, Nigeria, Ozokwo began his career at local side Enugu Rangers. He moved to French outfit OGC Nice, signing a one-year contract shortly before the transfer window for summer 2007 closed. At the Côte d'Azur club he played alongside compatriot Onyekachi Apam, also a former Enugu Rangers player.

Nice choose not to renew his contract in the summer of 2009, so Ozokwo returned to Enugu Rangers for the remainder of the year.

In January 2010, he joined TFF First League side Boluspor on a six-month contract.

== International career ==
Represented his country in the 2007 African Youth Championship where his team were runners up to Congo.

Following this he captained the side in the 2007 U-20 World Cup in Canada where he wore the number nine shirt as the team exited in the quarter-finals.
