= Emre Güngör =

Turkish footballer

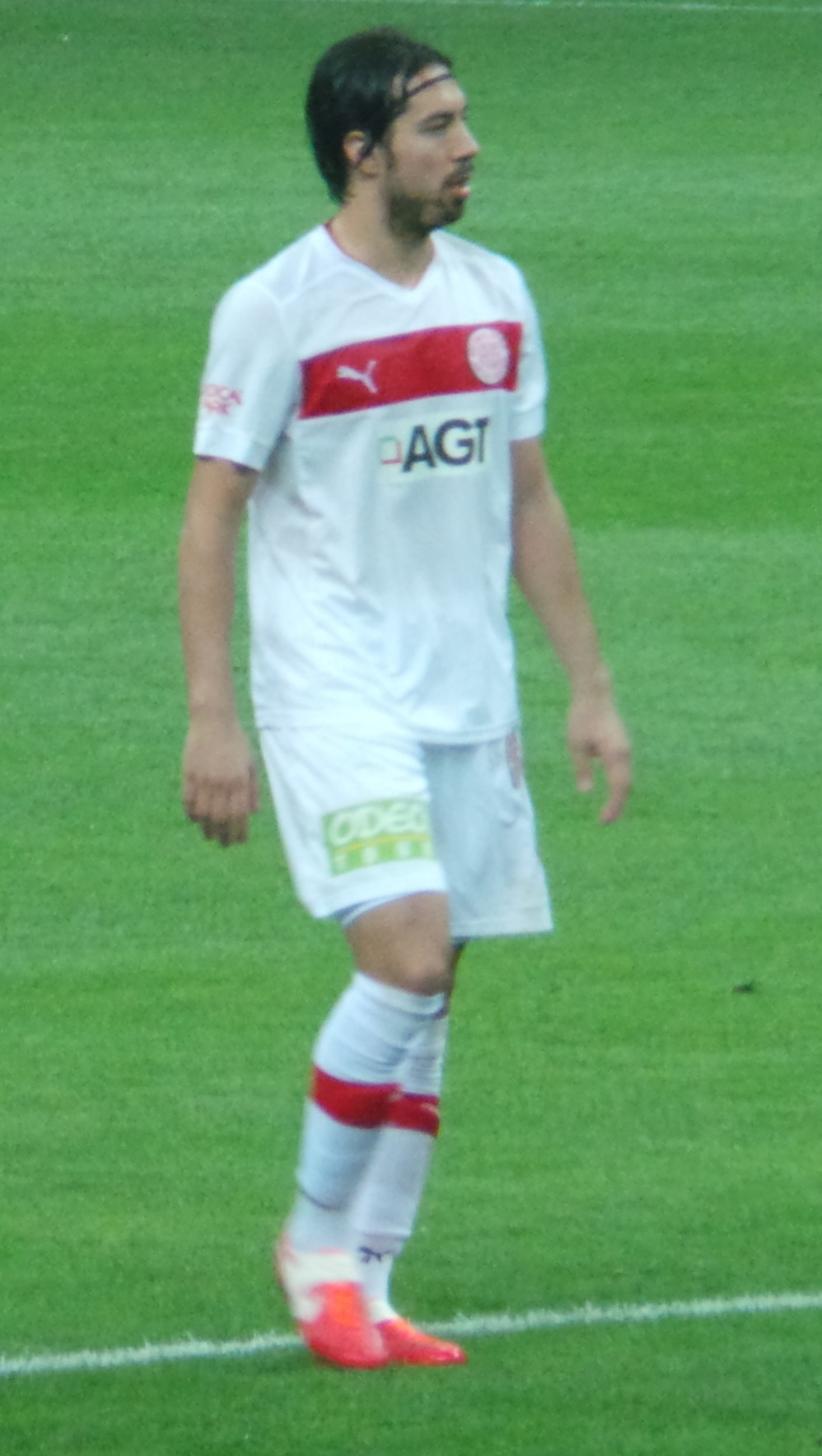
- Güngör with Antalyaspor

Personal information
- Full name: Fehmi Emre Güngör
- Date of birth: 1 August 1984 (age 42)
- Place of birth: Istanbul, Turkey
- Height: 1.82 m (6 ft 0 in)
- Position: Centre-back

Youth career
- 1998–2001: Bakırköyspor

Senior career*
Years	Team	Apps	(Gls)
2001–2002	Ankaragücü	2	(0)
2002–2003	→ Türk Telekomspor (loan)	12	(1)
2003–2004	Türk Telekomspor	26	(1)
2004–2007	Ankaragücü	81	(4)
2007–2010	Galatasaray	53	(0)
2010–2012	Gaziantepspor	44	(1)
2012–2014	Antalyaspor	45	(1)
2014–2015	Karabükspor	13	(1)
2015–2016	Eskişehirspor	18	(0)
2016–2017	Bandırmaspor	9	(0)

International career
2001	Turkey U16	6	(0)
2001	Turkey U17	2	(0)
2001	Turkey U18	1	(0)
2002	Turkey U19	14	(0)
2004–2006	Turkey U21	20	(0)
2008–2010	Turkey	4	(1)
- * Club domestic league appearances and goals

Fehmi Emre Güngör (born 1 August 1984) is a Turkish former professional footballer who played as a centre-back. He was part of the Turkey squad that reached the semi-finals of Euro 2008.

Güngör spent his entire 16-year professional football career in Turkey, and won one Süper Lig with Galatasaray.

== Career statistics ==
=== Club ===
Appearances and goals by club, season and competition
Club	Season	League		Cup		Europe		Total	
Club	Season	Apps	Goals	Apps	Goals	Apps	Goals	Apps	Goals
Ankaragücü	2001–02	2	0	0	0	–		2	0
Türk Telekomspor (loan)	2002–03	12	1	0	0	–		12	1
Türk Telekomspor	2003–04	26	1	0	0	–		26	1
Ankaragücü	2004–05	12	1	0	0	–		12	1
Ankaragücü	2005–06	27	2	4	2	–		31	4
Ankaragücü	2006–07	30	1	4	0	–		34	1
Ankaragücü	2007–08	12	0	0	0	–		12	0
Ankaragücü	Total	81	4	8	2	0	0	89	6
Galatasaray	2007–08	16	0	6	0	2	0	24	0
Galatasaray	2008–09	5	0	2	0	2	0	9	0
Galatasaray	2009–10	10	0	5	0	4	0	19	0
Galatasaray	Total	31	0	13	0	8	0	52	0
Gaziantepspor	2010–11	26	1	4	0	0	0	30	1
Gaziantepspor	2011–12	18	0	0	0	4	1	22	1
Gaziantepspor	Total	44	1	4	0	4	1	52	2
Career total		196	7	25	2	12	1	233	10

As of 23 June 2012

=== International ===
#	Date	Venue	Opponent	Score	Result	Competition
1.	3 March 2010	BJK İnönü Stadium, Istanbul, Turkey	Honduras	1–0	2–0	Friendly
Correct as of 7 September 2010

== Honours ==
Galatasaray

- Süper Lig: 2007–08
- Süper Kupa: 2007–08

Turkey

- UEFA European Championship semi-finals: 2008
