= Tidiane Sane =

Senegalese footballer

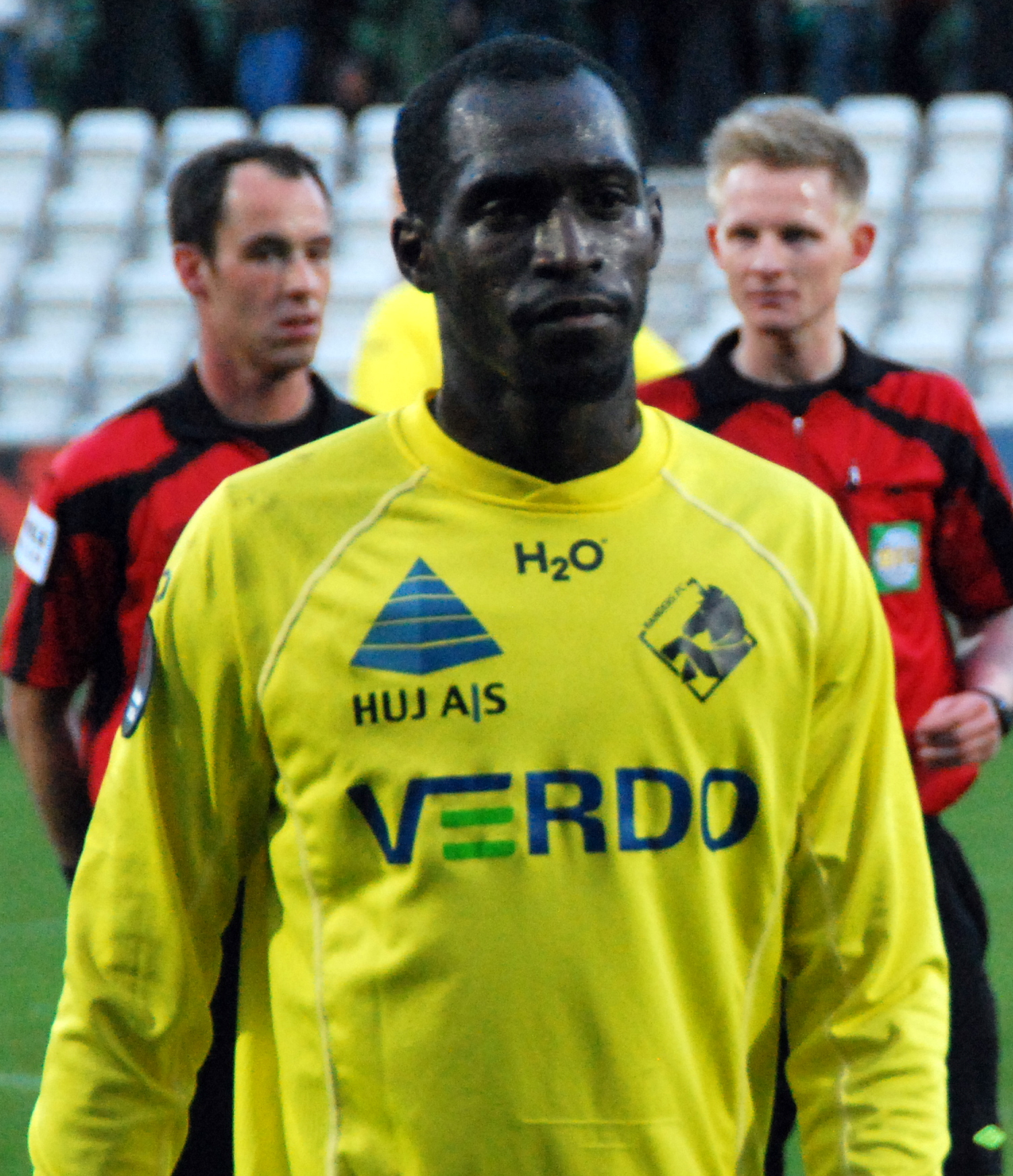
- Sane in April 2012. (Photo: Lars Schmidt)

Personal information
- Date of birth: 10 July 1985 (age 41)
- Place of birth: Senegal
- Height: 1.79 m (5 ft 10 in)
- Position: Central midfielder

Senior career*
Years	Team	Apps	(Gls)
2006–2012	Randers FC	171	(27)
2013–2015	Elazığspor	40	(7)
2015–2016	Hobro IK	12	(0)

International career
	Senegal U-20	1	(0)
- * Club domestic league appearances and goals as of 21 June 2016

Tidiane Sane (born 10 July 1985) is a Senegalese professional football midfielder.

== Club history ==
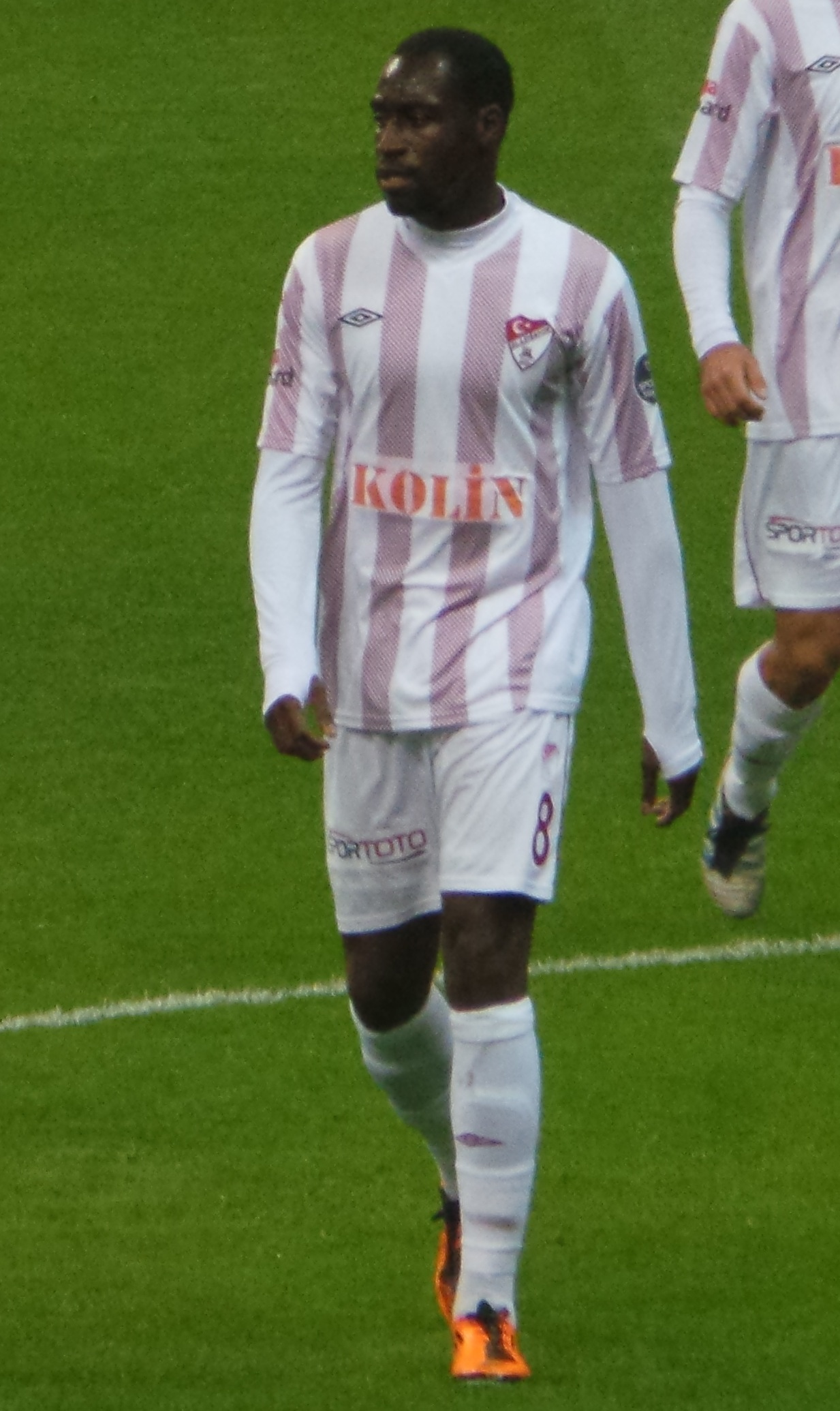
Sane with Elazığspor

=== Randers FC ===
Sane was signed by Randers FC in the 2006–07 season. In his first season, he scored three goals total. Sane quickly established himself in the first team after some good performances. In the 2007/2008 he managed to score six goals for his side and was a first team regular.

Sane started off the 2008–09 season in great form. He scored two goals in the first match against local rivals AGF the game ended 3–1.

In the third round Sane added to his goal tally by scoring the third goal in a 0–3 victory against Brondby IF. Thereby Sane helped Randers to temporary claim the 1st place in the league after three rounds similar to last season.

Due to these solid performances Sane gained recognition in the media and was praised for his good and all round play. As a result, he was nominated for player of the month.

After a long period with some unlucky games, resulting in relegation for Randers FC, Sane found himself on the first team squad yet again. This was partly due to the reunion with the English coach Colin Todd, whom he has described as a father.

=== Elazığspor ===
In January 2013 Sane signed for Turkish Süper Lig side Elazığspor.

=== Hobro IK ===
On 9 July 2015, Sane returned to the Danish Superliga and signed a one-year contract with Hobro IK. He said that he chose Horbo, because he knew many of the players from his time at Randers FC. He left the club after one season having 13 appearances.
