= Ivan (footballer, born 1982) =

Brazilian footballer

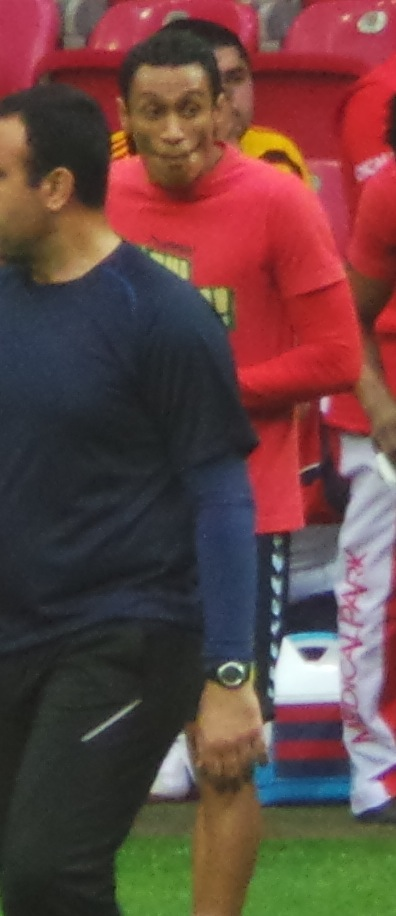

Personal information
- Full name: Ivan Saraiva de Souza
- Date of birth: 18 January 1982 (age 44)
- Place of birth: Campinas, Brazil
- Height: 1.76 m (5 ft 9 in)
- Position: Left-back

Youth career
- 2000: Atlético-PR

Senior career*
Years	Team	Apps	(Gls)
2001–2007	Atlético-PR	103	(3)
2005	→ Shakhtar (loan)	3	(0)
2007	→ Fluminense (loan)	7	(0)
2008–2012	Gaziantepspor	118	(5)
2012–2013	Mersin Idman Yurdu	27	(0)
2014	Figueirense	6	(0)
Total		264	(8)
- * Club domestic league appearances and goals

Ivan Saraiva de Souza or simply Ivan (born 18 January 1982) is a Brazilian former professional footballer who played as a left-back.
