= Hakan Kutlu =

Turkish footballer (born 1972)

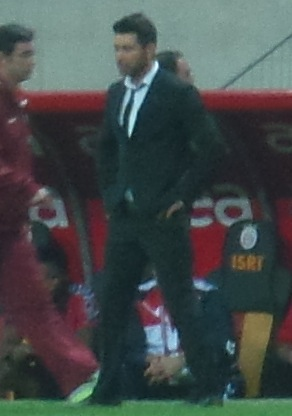

Personal information
- Full name: Selim Hakan Kutlu
- Date of birth: 14 January 1972 (age 54)
- Place of birth: Amasya, Turkey
- Height: 1.83 m (6 ft 0 in)
- Position: Central defender

Senior career*
Years	Team	Apps	(Gls)
1992–2007	Ankaragücü	357	(6)

Managerial career
- 2007–2008: Ankaragücü
- 2008–2009: Ankaragücü
- 2009–2010: Denizlispor
- 2010: Manisaspor
- 2011–2012: Ankaragücü
- 2013–2014: Mersin IY
- 2014–2015: Gaziantep BB
- 2016: Mersin IY
- 2016: Kayserispor
- 2018: Adana Demirspor
- 2019–2020: Giresunspor
- 2021: Denizlispor
- 2021: Kasımpaşa
- 2022: Tuzlaspor
- 2023–2025: Erzurumspor
- 2025: Vanspor
- 2025–2026: Sakaryaspor
- * Club domestic league appearances and goals

Hakan Kutlu (born 14 January 1972) is a Turkish football manager and former player. As a player, he played as a central defender and was a long time captain of Ankaragücü.

He is one of the one-club men in Turkey. Kutlu retired as a player in August 2007 after spending 28 consecutive years at the club, starting from the youth team. He then began working as the club's sports director.

Kutlu returned to Mersin IY on 6 January 2016 but was in the club lesser than 24 hours, before he left the job again.

== Managerial statistics ==
Last updated 3 May 2012

Team	From	To	Record				
Team	From	To	G	W	D	L	Win %
Ankaragücü	2007	2008	26	7	8	11	26.92%
Ankaragücü	2008	2009	19	6	2	11	31.58%
Denizlispor	2009	2010	32	8	7	17	25%
Manisaspor	2010-Jun	2010-Sep	4	0	0	4	0%
Ankaragücü	2011		23	2	2	19	8.7%
Career total			104	23	19	62	22.12%
