= Danilo Bueno =

Brazilian footballer (born 1983)

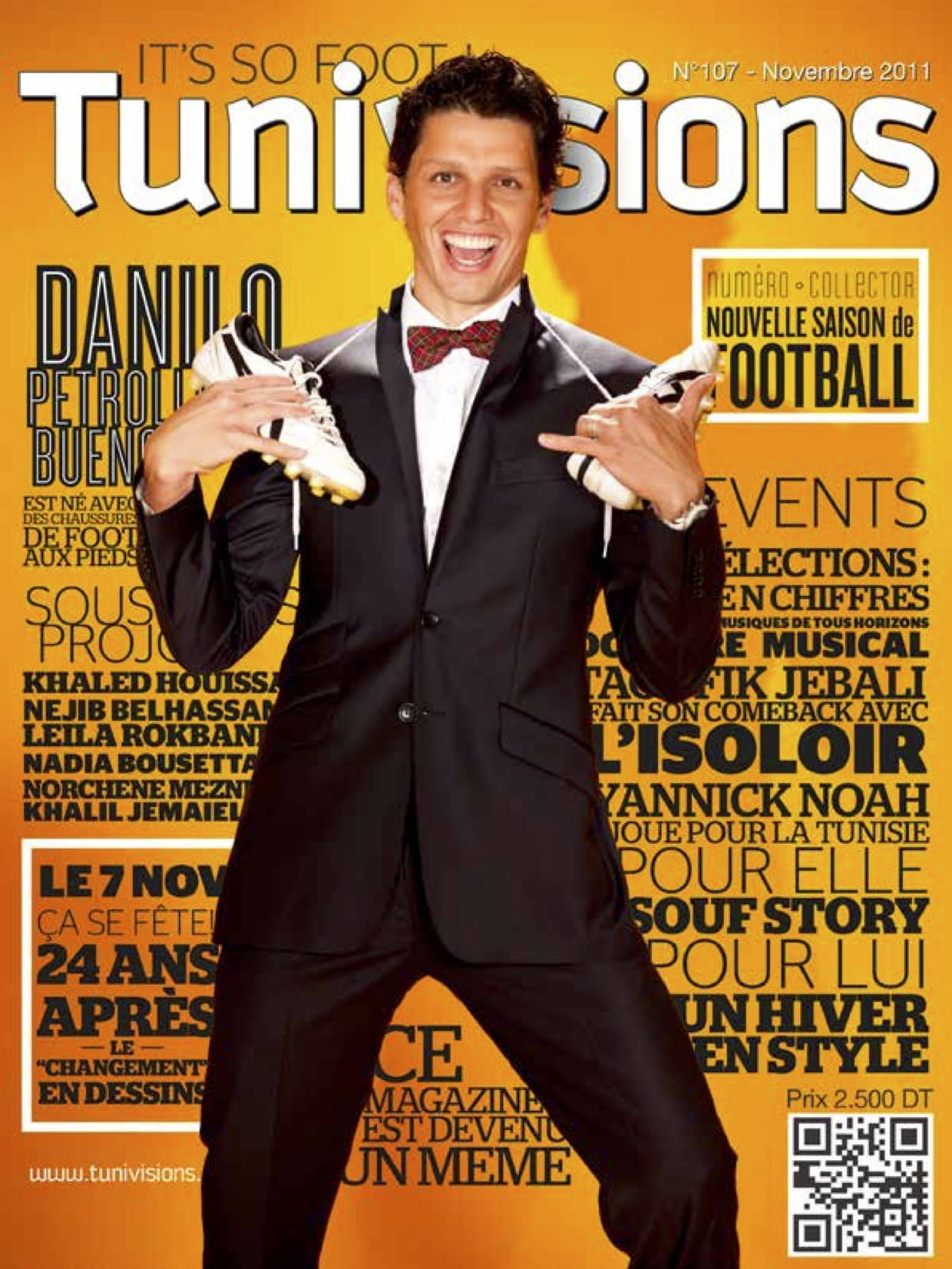

Personal information
- Full name: Danilo Petrolli Bueno
- Date of birth: 27 December 1983 (age 42)
- Place of birth: Monte Alegre do Sul, Brazil
- Height: 1.79 m (5 ft 10 1/2 in)
- Position: Midfielder

Senior career*
Years	Team	Apps	(Gls)
1999–2002	Portuguesa	24	(3)
2002–2006	Vitória	49	(18)
2006–2010	Bragantino	63	(19)
2010–2012	Etoile du Sahel	52	(24)
2012	Mersin İdmanyurdu	22	(1)
2013	Botafogo Ribeirão Preto	7	(0)
2013–2014	São Caetano	29	(5)
2014–2015	Al Ittihad Kalba	23	(3)
2015	CRB	18	(1)
2016	Botafogo Ribeirão Preto	9	(1)
2016–2017	AEL Limassol	17	(3)
2017–2018	Al-Riffa		
2018	Bragantino	15	(3)
2019	XV de Novembro	11	(1)
- * Club domestic league appearances and goals

Danilo Petrolli Bueno (born 27 December 1983) is a Brazilian former footballer who played as a midfielder.

== Career ==
He played in different positions in the Midfield (Centre Midfielder, Deep-lying playmaker, Playmaker, Attacking Midfielder, Side Midfielder). In the 2008–09 Brazilian Série B season he was chosen as the best player of the second period.

In June 2010, he signed a 4 years deal contract with African club Étoile Sportive du Sahel (Tunisia) for a total amount of $950 000. Before signing with Étoile Sportive du Sahel he had received some contracts from Italian sides like Reggina Calcio, Calcio Catania, and the Brazilian side of São Paulo FC.
