= 2013–14 Sivasspor season =

Sivasspor
2013–14 season
- Chairman: Mecnun Otyakmaz
- Manager: Roberto Carlos
- Stadium: Sivas 4 Eylül Stadium
- Süper Lig: 5th
- Turkish Cup: Group stage
- Top goalscorer: League: Aatif Chahechouhe (17); All: Aatif Chahechouhe (17)

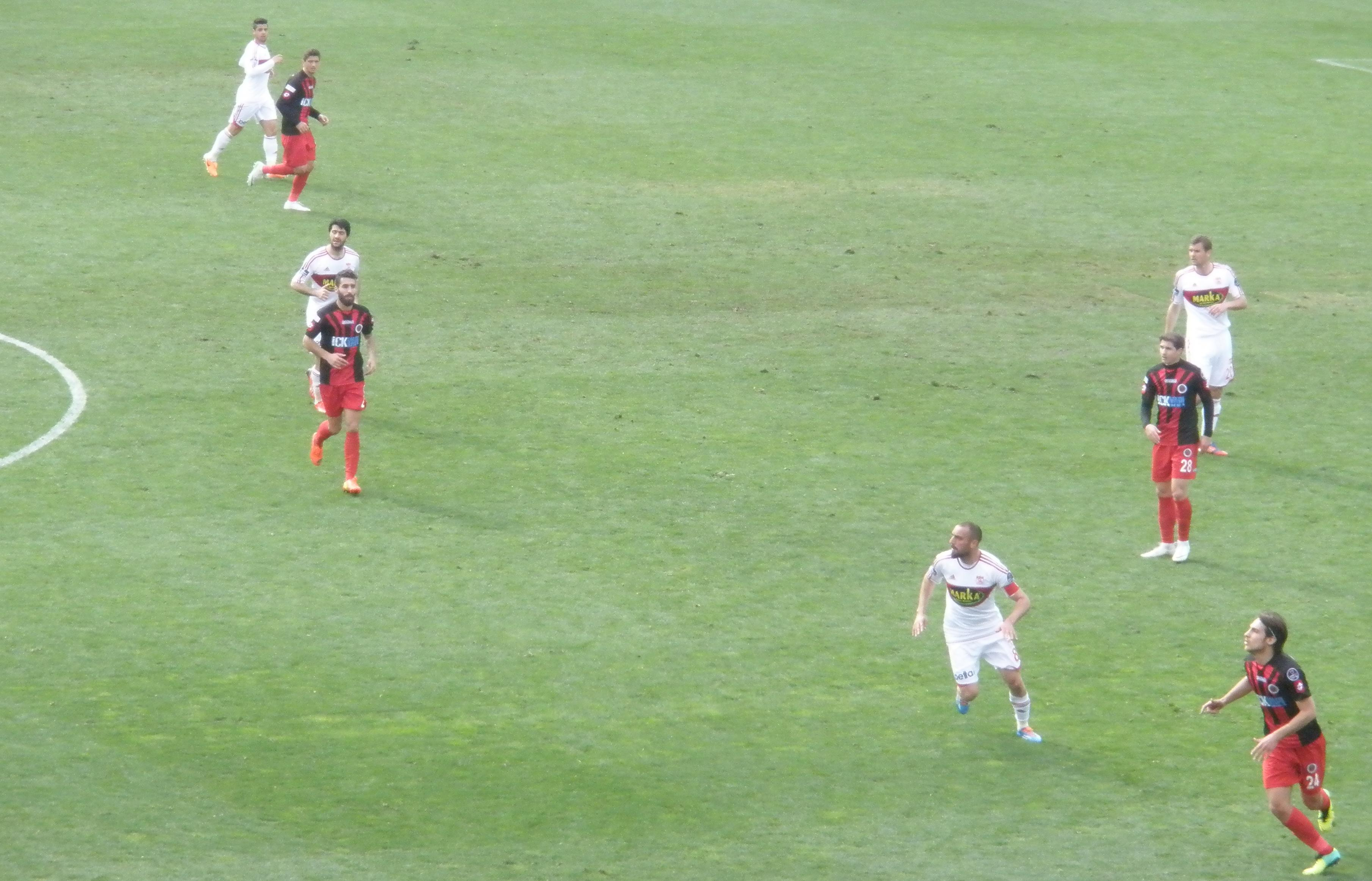
Turkish Super League match between Gençlerbirliği and Sivasspor.

The 2013–14 season was Sivasspor ninth consecutive season in the Süper Lig, and their 46th season. They finished the season in Fifth place in the Süper Lig and were knocked out of the Turkish Cup at the group stage.

== Squad ==
Note: Flags indicate national team as defined under FIFA eligibility rules; some limited exceptions apply. Players may hold more than one non-FIFA nationality.

No.	Pos.	Nation	Player
1	GK	TUR	Korcan Çelikay
2	DF	TUR	Abdurrahman Dereli
3	MF	TUR	Fatih Kıran
7	FW	BRA	Pedro Oldoni
8	MF	TUR	Kadir Bekmezci
12	DF	BRA	Cicinho
17	FW	AZE	Cihan Özkara
20	DF	CZE	Jakub Navrátil
21	MF	TUR	Burhan Eşer
22	DF	MAR	Manuel da Costa
23	GK	TUR	Nihat Sahin
27	GK	TUR	Mahmut Bezgin

No.	Pos.	Nation	Player
34	DF	TUR	Eren Aydın
37	MF	TUR	Hakan Arslan
46	DF	TUR	Ahmet Şahbaz
52	FW	TUR	Aykut Öztürk
54	FW	TUR	Batuhan Salman
58	DF	TUR	Ziya Erdal
66	MF	TUR	Adem Koçak
80	DF	TUR	Ümit Kurt
82	MF	TUR	Aydın Karabulut
91	MF	MAR	Mehdi Taouil
92	FW	MAR	Aatif Chahechouhe
99	FW	NGR	John Utaka

=== Out on loan ===
Note: Flags indicate national team as defined under FIFA eligibility rules; some limited exceptions apply. Players may hold more than one non-FIFA nationality.

No.	Pos.	Nation	Player
—	DF	TUR	Alihan Kubalas (at Altay until 30 June 2014)
—	DF	TUR	Gökhan Payal (at Yeni Diyarbakırspor until 30 June 2014)
—	DF	TUR	Kaan Kılcı (at Sivas 4 Eylül until 30 June 2014)
—	DF	TUR	Şaban Özel (at Samsunspor until 30 June 2014)

No.	Pos.	Nation	Player
—	DF	TUR	Safa Yıldırım (at Sivas 4 Eylül until 30 June 2014)
—	DF	TUR	Uğur Akdemir (at Kartalspor until 30 June 2014)
—	MF	TUR	Ahmet Aras (at Fethiyespor until 30 June 2014)
—	MF	TUR	Alican Karadağ (at Boluspor until 30 June 2014)

== Transfers ==
=== Summer ===
In: Note: Flags indicate national team as defined under FIFA eligibility rules; some limited exceptions apply. Players may hold more than one non-FIFA nationality.

No.	Pos.	Nation	Player
2	DF	TUR	Abdurrahman Dereli (from (Turkey) Kasımpaşa)
11	FW	PER	Hernán Rengifo (from (Peru) Sporting Cristal)
12	DF	BRA	Cicinho (from (Brazil) Sport)
21	MF	TUR	Burhan Eşer (from (Turkey) Eskişehirspor)
22	DF	MAR	Manuel da Costa (footballer) (from (Russia) Lokomotiv Moscow)
34	DF	TUR	Eren Aydın (from (Turkey) Elazığspor)
37	MF	TUR	Hakan Arslan (from (Turkey) Samsunspor)
46	DF	TUR	Ahmet Şahbaz (from (Turkey) Silivrispor)
82	MF	TUR	Aydın Karabulut (from (Turkey) Elazığspor)
91	MF	MAR	Mehdi Taouil (from (Scotland) Hearts)
99	FW	NGR	John Utaka (from (France) Montpellier)

Out: Note: Flags indicate national team as defined under FIFA eligibility rules; some limited exceptions apply. Players may hold more than one non-FIFA nationality.

No.	Pos.	Nation	Player
6	MF	TUR	Mehmet Nas (to (Turkey) Elazığspor)
11	MF	TUR	Erman Kılıç (to (Turkey) Galatasaray)
14	FW	NGR	Michael Eneramo (to (Turkey) Beşiktaş)
16	MF	CZE	Milan Černý (to (Czech Republic) Dukla Prague)
22	FW	POL	Arkadiusz Piech (to (Poland) Zagłębie Lubin)
33	DF	CZE	Jan Rajnoch (to (Turkey) Adana Demirspor)
34	GK	SVK	Štefan Senecký
44	DF	TUR	Erhan Güven (to (Turkey) Kayseri Erciyesspor)
58	DF	TUR	Hayrettin Yerlikaya
67	MF	TUR	Uğur Kavuk (to (Turkey) Gaziantepspor)
99	FW	TUR	Sercan Yıldırım (loan return to (Turkey) Galatasaray)

=== Winter ===
In: Note: Flags indicate national team as defined under FIFA eligibility rules; some limited exceptions apply. Players may hold more than one non-FIFA nationality.

No.	Pos.	Nation	Player
7	FW	BRA	Pedro Oldoni (from (Portugal) Vitória)
27	GK	TUR	Mahmut Bezgin (from (Turkey) Mersin Idman Yurdu)
52	FW	TUR	Aykut Öztürk (from (Germany) Rot-Weiß Erfurt)
93	DF	TUR	İbrahim Sürgülü (loan return from (Turkey) Fethiyespor)

Out: Note: Flags indicate national team as defined under FIFA eligibility rules; some limited exceptions apply. Players may hold more than one non-FIFA nationality.

No.	Pos.	Nation	Player
4	MF	TUR	Murat Akça (to (Turkey) Kardemir Karabükspor)
7	FW	BOL	Ricardo Pedriel (to (Bolivia) Club Bolívar)
9	MF	TUR	Abdulkadir Özgen (to (Turkey) Manisaspor)
10	MF	POL	Kamil Grosicki (to (France) Stade Rennais)
11	FW	PER	Hernán Rengifo (to (Peru) Juan Aurich)
18	GK	CAN	Milan Borjan
19	FW	TUR	Timur Özgöz (to (Turkey) Adana Demirspor)
45	MF	ALG	Rafik Djebbour (to (England) Nottingham Forest)
93	DF	TUR	İbrahim Sürgülü (loan to (Turkey) Fethiyespor)

== Competitions ==
=== Süper Lig ===
==== Results ====
19 August 2013 1	Kayserispor	1 – 0	Sivasspor	Kayseri
20:00 EEST (UTC+3)	Dursun (yellow card) 40'; Yilmaz (yellow card) 49' (goal) 55'; Bayram (yellow card) 80'	Summary	da Costa (yellow card) 90+4'	Stadium: Kadir Has Stadium; Referee: Yunus Yildrim

25 August 2013 2	Sivasspor	2 – 0	Torku Konyaspor	Sivas
20:15 EEST (UTC+3)	Koçak (yellow card) 53'; Eşer 55' da Costa (yellow card) 64'; Kurt 66'	Summary	Kokalović (yellow card) 22'	Stadium: Sivas 4 Eylül Stadium; Referee: Hüseyin Göçek

31 August 2013 3	Fenerbahçe	5 – 2	Sivasspor	Istanbul
21:45 EEST (UTC+3)	Kuyt 15', 35'; Alves 32' (yellow card) 52'; Webó 49'; Potuk 90'	Summary	Bekmezci (yellow card) 47'; Chahechouhe 55'; Cicinho 83' da Costa (yellow card) 85'; Özkara (yellow card) 87'	Stadium: Şükrü Saracoğlu Stadium; Referee: Özgür Yankaya

15 September 2013 4	Sivasspor	3 – 2	Eskişehirspor	Sivas
18:00 EEST (UTC+3)	Utaka 9' da Costa 48'; Erdal (yellow card) 62'; Chahechouhe 73'; Taouil (yellow card) 81'; Eşer (yellow card) 86'	Summary	Kamara 7'; Boffin (yellow card) 24'; Kara (yellow card) 29'; Diego Ângelo de Oliveira (yellow card) 52'; Sarı 58'; Zengin (red card) 65'	Stadium: Sivas 4 Eylül Stadium; Referee: Kuddusi Muftuoglu

21 September 2013 5	Sivasspor	1 – 2	Kasımpaşa	Sivas
18:00 EEST (UTC+3)	da Costa 45'; Cicinho (yellow card) 71'	Summary	Scarione 19'; Şeras (yellow card) 24'; Viúdez 44' (yellow card) 53'	Stadium: Sivas 4 Eylül Stadium; Referee: Halis Özkahya

29 September 2013 6	Elazığspor	2 – 4	Sivasspor	Elazığ
16:00 EEST (UTC+3)	Sane (yellow card) 43' (goal) 60' (pen.); Görk 50' (yellow card) 52'; Birinci (yellow card) 55' (yellow-red card); Vitolo (yellow card) 66'	Summary	da Costa 4' (yellow card) 59' (yellow-red card); Utaka 17'; Eşer (yellow card) 53'; Chahechouhe 76', 89' (pen.); Erdal (yellow card) 78'; Akça (yellow card) 83'; Djebbour (yellow card) 90+2'	Stadium: Elazığ Atatürk Stadium; Referee: Deniz Coban

6 October 2013 7	Sivasspor	2 – 0	Gençlerbirliği	Sivas
19:00 EEST (UTC+3)	Karabulut 32'; Djebbour 88'	Summary	Gosso (yellow card) 62'; Stancu (yellow card) 67'	Stadium: Sivas 4 Eylül Stadium; Referee: Yunus Yildirim

20 October 2013 8	Trabzonspor	0 – 0	Sivasspor	Trabzon
16:00 EEST (UTC+3)	Yumlu (red card) 62'	Summary	da Costa (yellow card) 38'; Erdal (yellow card) 64'; Bekmezci (yellow card) 80'; Taouil (yellow card) 90+1'	Stadium: Hüseyin Avni Aker Stadium; Referee: Fırat Aydınus

25 October 2013 9	Sivasspor	2 – 0	Kayseri Erciyesspor	Sivas
20:00 EEST (UTC+3)	Chahechouhe 20', 75'; Djebbour (yellow card) 45+1'	Summary	Can (yellow card) 66'; Azofeifa (yellow card) 72'; Vleminckx (red card) 85'; Jorgačević (yellow card) 86'; Murat Akin (yellow card) 89'	Stadium: Sivas 4 Eylül Stadium; Referee: Mustafa Ogretmenoglu

4 November 2013 10	Gaziantepspor	0 – 4	Sivasspor	Gaziantep
20:00 EEST (UTC+3)	Tokak (yellow card) 70'; Has (yellow card) 82'	Summary	Chahechouhe 34' (pen.), 78'; Arslan 54', 65'	Stadium: Gaziantep Kamil Ocak Stadium; Referee: Mustafa Coskun

9 November 2013 11	Sivasspor	2 – 1	Bursaspor	Sivas
19:00 EEST (UTC+3)	Erdal (yellow card) 49'; Eşer 59'; Bekmezci (yellow card) 64'; Chahechouhe 80' (yellow card) 81'	Summary	Kiraz (yellow card) 54'; Belluschi (yellow card) 71'; Taiwo 77'; Kazim-Richards (yellow card) 87'	Stadium: Sivas 4 Eylül Stadium; Referee: Mete Kalkavan

23 November 2013 12	Galatasaray	2 – 1	Sivasspor	Istanbul
19:00 EEST (UTC+3)	Yılmaz 13'; Nounkeu (yellow card) 15' (yellow-red card); İnan 36' (pen.); Bulut (yellow card) 44'; İşcan (yellow card) 89'	Summary	da Costa (yellow card) 25' (red card) 90'; Kurt (yellow card) 27' (yellow-red card) 39'; Djebbour 31'; Cicinho (yellow card) 35' (yellow-red card); Eşer (yellow card) 55'; Bekmezci (yellow card) 74'	Stadium: Türk Telekom Arena; Referee: Halis Özkahya

29 November 2013 13	Sivasspor	0 – 3	Antalyaspor	Sivas
20:00 EEST (UTC+3)	Taouil (yellow card) 42'; Navrátil (yellow card) 81'	Summary	Nizam (yellow card) 44'; Diarra 58'; Başsan 62'; Promise 89'	Stadium: Sivas 4 Eylül Stadium; Referee: Abdullah Yilmaz

9 December 2013 14	Beşiktaş	1 – 1	Sivasspor	Istanbul
20:00 EET (UTC+2)	Almeida 5'; Escudé (yellow card) 70'	Summary	da Costa 71'	Stadium: Recep Tayyip Erdoğan Stadium; Referee: Mustafa Abitoglu

14 December 2013 15	Sivasspor	3 – 1	Çaykur Rizespor	Sivas
13:30 EEST (UTC+3)	Eşer 68', 90'; Chahechouhe 76' (pen.); Aydın (yellow card) 86'; Özkara (yellow card) 90+3'	Summary	Cernat 52'; Ali Adnan Kadhim (yellow card) 53'; Oboabona (yellow card) 69'	Stadium: Sivas 4 Eylül Stadium; Referee: Cuneyt Çakιr

23 December 2013 16	Akhisar Belediyespor	2 – 1	Sivasspor	Akhisar
EEST (UTC+3)	Vardar (yellow card) 21'; Akyüz 39'; Özer (yellow card) 90'; Zengin 90'	Summary	Eşer 30'; Karabulut (yellow card) 38'; Kurt (red card) 72'	Stadium: Manisa 19 Mayıs Stadium; Referee: Serkan Cinar

29 December 2013 17	Sivasspor	3 – 1	Kardemir Karabükspor	Sivas
13:30 EEST (UTC+3)	da Costa 9', 24'; Cicinho (yellow card) 72'; Eşer 85'	Summary	Parlak 44'; Pedersen (yellow card) 55'; İncedemir (yellow card) 73'	Stadium: Sivas 4 Eylül Stadium; Referee: Mete Kalkavan

26 January 2014 18	Sivasspor	3 – 0	Kayserispor	Sivas
13:30 EEST (UTC+3)	Chahechouhe 51', 60'; Arslan (yellow card) 78'; Erdal 82'	Summary	Henrique Sereno (red card) 79'; Yalçın (yellow card) 80'	Stadium: Sivas 4 Eylül Stadium; Referee: Firat Aydinus

2 February 2014 19	Torku Konyaspor	3 – 0	Sivasspor	Konya
16:00 EEST (UTC+3)	Djalma Campos 6'; Kabze 25'; Çamdalı (yellow card) 43'; Gekas 62'; Kılıçaslan (yellow card) 85'	Summary	Erdal (yellow card) 63'; Kurt (yellow card) 90'	Stadium: Konya Atatürk Stadium; Referee: Bulent Yildirim

9 February 2014 20	Sivasspor	2 – 0	Fenerbahçe	Sivas
16:00 EEST (UTC+3)	Karabulut 58'; Chahechouhe (yellow card) 71'; Eşer 81'	Summary	Erkin (yellow card) 11'; Korkmaz (yellow card) 21' (red card) 22'; Raul Meireles (yellow card) 72'	Stadium: Sivas 4 Eylül Stadium; Referee: Yunus Yildirim

17 February 2014 21	Eskişehirspor	2 – 2	Sivasspor	Eskişehir
20:00 EEST (UTC+3)	Bienvenu 19'; Kara 85'; Zengin (yellow card) 88'	Summary	Chahechouhe 52' (yellow card) 53'; Eşer 69' (yellow card) 70'; Taouil (yellow card) 86'	Stadium: Eskişehir Atatürk Stadium; Referee: Deniz Coban

23 February 2014 22	Kasımpaşa	6 – 2	Sivasspor	Istanbul
13:30 EEST (UTC+3)	Scarione 6'; Malki 27'; Eker (yellow card) 33'; Babel 36' (pen.); Viúdez 47'; Torun 66'; Castro 90+1'	Summary	Arslan 51'; Isaksson 69' (o.g.) da Costa (red card) 90'	Stadium: Recep Tayyip Erdoğan Stadium; Referee: Bulent Yildirim

2 March 2014 23	Sivasspor	1 – 3	Elazığspor	Sivas
13:30 EEST (UTC+3)	Eşer 33'	Summary	Yilmaz 8' (pen.), 68'; Zeegelaar (yellow card) 29'; Özkan 71' (yellow card) 72'	Stadium: Sivas 4 Eylül Stadium; Referee: Firat Aydinus

9 March 2014 24	Gençlerbirliği	2 – 1	Sivasspor	Ankara
13:30 EEST (UTC+3)	İleri (yellow card) 13'; Kaya (yellow card) 47'; Stancu 59' (pen.); Çalışkan (yellow card) 73'; Durmaz 82'; Zec (yellow card) 83'; Çelik (yellow card) 88'	Summary	Radzkow 19' (o.g.)	Stadium: Ankara 19 Mayıs Stadium; Referee: Tolga Ozkalfa

16 March 2014 25	Sivasspor	0 – 4	Trabzonspor	Sivas
16:00 EEST (UTC+3)		Summary	Yumlu 2'; Adın 18'; Henrique 31'; Bourceanu (yellow card) 32'; Hurmacı 56' (yellow card) 57'	Stadium: Sivas 4 Eylül Stadium; Referee: Cuneyt Çakιr

23 March 2014 26	Kayseri Erciyesspor	1 – 1	Sivasspor	Kayseri
16:00 EEST (UTC+3)	Mandjeck (yellow card) 27'; Edinho 57' (pen.); Öztürk (yellow card) 73'	Summary	Navrátil (yellow card) 32'; Karabulut (yellow card) 42' (goal) 76'; Bekmezci (yellow card) 48'	Stadium: Kadir Has Stadium; Referee: Ozgur Yankaya

29 March 2014 27	Sivasspor	3 – 2	Gaziantepspor	Sivas
13:30 EEST (UTC+3)	Utaka 15', 90+2'; Karabulut (yellow card) 58'; Eşer 71' (yellow card) 82'	Summary	Can 34'; Has (yellow card) 55'; Tosun (yellow card) 70'; Sapara 86'; Kulbilge (yellow card) 88'	Stadium: Sivas 4 Eylül Stadium; Referee: Ali Palabıyık

6 April 2014 28	Bursaspor	4 – 3	Sivasspor	Bursa
16:00 EEST (UTC+3)	Fernandão 9', 39', 69'; Özbayraklı 11'; Belluschi (yellow card) 89'; Çinaz (yellow card) 90'	Summary	Utaka 3'; Eşer 34', 36'; Bekmezci (yellow card) 74'; Kurt (yellow card) 83'	Stadium: Bursa Atatürk Stadium; Referee: Volkan Bayarslan

12 April 2014 29	Sivasspor	2 – 1	Galatasaray	Sivas
19:00 EEST (UTC+3)	Chahechouhe 17' da Costa (yellow card) 53'; Utaka 60'	Summary	Yekta 42'; Yılmaz (yellow card) 49'; Kaya (yellow card) 55'	Stadium: Sivas 4 Eylül Stadium; Attendance: 11,000; Referee: Mustafa Coşkun

21 April 2014 30	Antalyaspor	1 – 2	Sivasspor	Antalya
20:00 EEST (UTC+3)	Dağaşan (yellow card) 61'; Şentürk 67' (yellow card) 70'; Güngör (yellow card) 79'; Boum (yellow card) 84'	Summary	da Costa (yellow card) 23'; Karabulut 53'; Chahechouhe 84' (pen.)	Stadium: Akdeniz University Stadium; Referee: Firat Aydinus

27 April 2014 31	Sivasspor	3 – 0	Beşiktaş	Sivas
19:00 EEST (UTC+3)	Utaka (yellow card) 43' (goal) 56'; Zengin 70' (o.g.); Eşer (yellow card) 73'; Chahechouhe 82'	Summary	Boral (yellow card) 72'	Stadium: Sivas 4 Eylül Stadium; Referee: Mete Kalkavan

4 May 2014 32	Çaykur Rizespor	1 – 1	Sivasspor	Rize
15:30 EEST (UTC+3)	Ovacıklı (yellow card) 57'; Oboabona 90'	Summary	Erdal (yellow card) 35'; Bekmezci (yellow card) 55'; Arslan 89'; Sahin (yellow card) 90+3'	Stadium: Yeni Rize Şehir Stadı; Referee: Volkan Bayarslan

11 May 2014 33	Sivasspor	3 – 1	Akhisar Belediyespor	Manisa
19:00 EEST (UTC+3)	Karabulut (yellow card) 52'; Utaka 64', 79'; Cicinho (yellow card) 70'; Kurt (yellow card) 72'; Chahechouhe 90+5'	Summary	Kuaté (red card) 52'; Zengin 59'; Konuk (yellow card) 83'	Stadium: Manisa 19 Mayıs Stadium; Referee: Mustafa Coskun

18 May 2014 34	Kardemir Karabükspor	1 – 0	Sivasspor	Karabük
19:00 EEST (UTC+3)	Parlak 50' (pen.); Özçal (yellow card) 79'; Waterman (yellow card) 90+2'	Summary	da Costa (yellow card) 79'; Erdal (yellow card) 86'	Stadium: Dr. Necmettin Şeyhoğlu Stadium; Referee: Mete Kalkavan

==== League table ====
Pos	Team	Pld	W	D	L	GF	GA	GD	Pts	Qualification or relegation
3	Beşiktaş	34	17	11	6	53	33	+20	62	Qualification for the Champions League third qualifying round (Note: Although Fenerbahçe would have qualified for the Champions League group stage as champions, they were barred from participating in next season's European competitions due to UEFA sanctioning because of the 2011 Turkish football match-fixing scandal, with this season also counting for that ban. As a result, the runners-up of the league (Galatasaray) entered the Champions League group stage instead of the third qualifying round, the third-placed team of the league (Beşiktaş) entered the Champions League third qualifying round instead of the Europa League play-off round, and the fourth-placed team of the league (Trabzonspor) entered the Europa League play-off round instead of the third qualifying round.)
4	Trabzonspor	34	14	11	9	53	41	+12	53 (Note: Trabzonspor finished ahead of Sivasspor on head-to-head record: Trabzonspor–Sivasspor 0–0, Sivasspor–Trabzonspor 0–4.)	Qualification for the Europa League play-off round
5	Sivasspor	34	16	5	13	60	55	+5	53	(Note: Sivasspor were banned from European competitions by UEFA due to match-fixing. As a result, their Europa League spot was passed down the league to the next eligible team (Karabükspor).)
6	Kasımpaşa (Note: Kasımpaşa, Konyaspor and Gaziantepspor were not granted a UEFA license by the Turkish Football Federation, and could therefore not qualify for European competitions.)	34	13	12	9	56	39	+17	51	
7	Karabükspor	34	13	11	10	33	34	−1	50	Qualification for the Europa League third qualifying round

Source: tff.org
Rules for classification: 1) points; 2) goal difference; 3) number of goals scored.

=== Turkish Cup ===
==== First stage ====
2 October 2013 Second round	Sivasspor	5 – 0	Bucak Belediyesi Oğuzhanspor	Sivas
18:00 EET (UTC+2)	Djebbour 15'; Özkara 49'; Arslan 63', 64'; Özgen 73'	Summary		Stadium: Sivas 4 Eylül Stadium; Referee: Bora Budak

29 October 2013 Third round	Sivasspor	3 – 1 (a.e.t.)	MKE Ankaragücü	Sivas
20:30 EET (UTC+2)	Arslan 88'; Toscalı 107' (o.g.); Djebbour 120'	Summary	Taşdemir 71'	Stadium: Sivas 4 Eylül Stadium; Referee: Kutluhan Bilgic

4 December 2013 Fourth round	Sivasspor	1 – 0	Silivrispor	Sivas
17:00 EET (UTC+2)	Grosicki 18'	Summary		Stadium: Sivas 4 Eylül Stadium; Attendance: 550; Referee: Hüseyin Sabancı

19 December 2013 Fifth round	Sivasspor	2 – 1 (a.e.t.)	Nazilli Belediyespor	Sivas
14:30 EET (UTC+2)	Arslan 93'; Cicinho 114'	Summary	Çelik 101'	Stadium: Sivas 4 Eylül Stadium; Attendance: 3,000; Referee: Koray Gençerler

==== Group stage ====
Pos	Team	Pld	W	D	L	GF	GA	GD	Pts
1	Bursaspor	6	4	1	1	11	4	+7	13
2	Eskişehirspor	6	3	1	2	6	7	−1	10
3	Akhisar Belediyespor	6	2	2	2	5	6	−1	8
4	Sivasspor	6	1	0	5	4	9	−5	3

14 January 2014 1	Bursaspor	2 – 1	Sivasspor	Bursa
19:00 EET (UTC+2)	Šesták 37', 72'	Summary	Eşer 57'	Stadium: Bursa Atatürk Stadium; Attendance: 22,500; Referee: Çağatay Şahan

18 January 2014 2	Sivasspor	0 – 2	Eskişehirspor	Sivas
16:30 EET (UTC+2)		Summary	Çek 42'; Bayramoğlu 86'	Stadium: Sivas 4 Eylül Stadium; Attendance: 5,000; Referee: Kutluhan Bilgiç

22 January 2014 3	Sivasspor	2 – 1	Akhisar Belediyespor	Sivas
13:30 EET (UTC+2)	Arslan 20', 84'	Summary	Özer 77'	Stadium: Sivas 4 Eylül Stadium; Attendance: 2,500; Referee: Mustafa Aydın

30 January 2014 4	Akhisar Belediyespor	1 – 0	Sivasspor	Manisa
19:00 EET (UTC+2)	Niasse 32'	Summary		Stadium: Manisa 19 Mayıs Stadium; Attendance: 3,000; Referee: Suat Arslanboğa

6 February 2014 5	Sivasspor	1 – 2	Bursaspor	Sivas
19:00 EET (UTC+2)	Özkara 71'	Summary	Šesták 53'; Şahbaz 85' (o.g.)	Stadium: Sivas 4 Eylül Stadium; Attendance: 2,250; Referee: Mustafa İlker Coşkun

12 February 2014 6	Eskişehirspor	1 – 0	Sivasspor	Eskişehir
20:00 EET (UTC+2)	Bienvenu 76'	Summary		Stadium: Eskişehir Atatürk Stadium; Attendance: 11,000; Referee: Onur Karabaş

== Squad statistics ==
=== Appearances and goals ===
No.	Pos	Nat	Player	Total		Süper Lig		Turkish Cup	
No.	Pos	Nat	Player	Apps	Goals	Apps	Goals	Apps	Goals
1	GK	(Turkey) TUR	Korcan Çelikay	27	0	23	0	4	0
2	DF	(Turkey) TUR	Abdurrahman Dereli	5	0	1	0	4	0
3	MF	(Turkey) TUR	Fatih Kıran	3	0	1	0	1+1	0
7	FW	(Brazil) BRA	Pedro Oldoni	10	0	0+7	0	2+1	0
8	MF	(Turkey) TUR	Kadir Bekmezci	39	0	32	0	6+1	0
12	DF	(Brazil) BRA	Cicinho	37	2	31	1	6	1
17	FW	(Azerbaijan) AZE	Cihan Özkara	23	2	1+14	0	5+3	2
20	DF	(Czech Republic) CZE	Jakub Navrátil	19	0	11+2	0	6	0
21	MF	(Turkey) TUR	Burhan Eşer	39	13	33	12	5+1	1
22	DF	(Morocco) MAR	Manuel da Costa	30	6	25	6	5	0
23	GK	(Turkey) TUR	Nihat Sahin	6	0	4+1	0	0+1	0
27	GK	(Turkey) TUR	Mahmut Bezgin	4	0	3	0	1	0
34	DF	(Turkey) TUR	Eren Aydın	9	0	1+2	0	6	0
37	MF	(Turkey) TUR	Hakan Arslan	37	10	11+17	4	9	6
46	DF	(Turkey) TUR	Ahmet Şahbaz	7	0	1+3	0	2+1	0
52	FW	(Turkey) TUR	Aykut Öztürk	6	0	1+4	0	1	0
54	FW	(Turkey) TUR	Batuhan Salman	2	0	0	0	0+2	0
58	DF	(Turkey) TUR	Ziya Erdal	34	1	30	1	4	0
66	MF	(Turkey) TUR	Adem Koçak	33	0	28	0	5	0
80	DF	(Turkey) TUR	Ümit Kurt	34	1	30	1	4	0
82	MF	(Turkey) TUR	Aydın Karabulut	37	4	29+1	4	5+2	0
91	MF	(Morocco) MAR	Mehdi Taouil	36	0	14+14	0	8	0
92	FW	(Morocco) MAR	Aatif Chahechouhe	40	17	34	17	5+1	0
99	FW	(Nigeria) NGR	John Utaka	26	9	18+4	9	3+1	0
Players away from the club on loan :
14	MF	(Turkey) TUR	Ahmet Aras	2	0	0+2	0	0	0
93	DF	(Turkey) TUR	İbrahim Sürgülü	2	0	0+1	0	0+1	0
Players who appeared for Sivasspor no longer at the club:
4	MF	(Turkey) TUR	Murat Akça	4	0	1+1	0	2	0
9	FW	(Turkey) TUR	Abdulkadir Özgen	4	1	0+1	0	1+2	1
10	MF	(Poland) POL	Kamil Grosicki	7	1	1+4	0	1+1	1
11	FW	(Peru) PER	Hernán Rengifo	1	0	0	0	1	0
18	GK	(Canada) CAN	Milan Borjan	9	0	4	0	5	0
19	FW	(Turkey) TUR	Timur Özgöz	2	0	0	0	1+1	0
45	MF	(Algeria) ALG	Rafik Djebbour	14	4	6+4	2	2+2	2

=== Goal scorers ===
Place	Position	Nation	Number	Name	Süper Lig	Turkish Cup	Total
1	FW	(Morocco)	92	Aatif Chahechouhe	17	0	17
2	MF	(Turkey)	21	Burhan Eşer	12	1	13
3	MF	(Turkey)	37	Hakan Arslan	4	6	10
4	FW	(Nigeria)	99	John Utaka	9	0	9
5	DF	(Morocco)	22	Manuel da Costa	6	0	6
6	MF	(Turkey)	82	Aydın Karabulut	4	0	4
6	MF	(Algeria)	45	Rafik Djebbour	2	2	4
6				Own goal	3	1	4
9	DF	(Brazil)	12	Cicinho	1	1	2
9	FW	(Azerbaijan)	17	Cihan Özkara	0	2	2
11	DF	(Turkey)	80	Ümit Kurt	1	0	1
11	DF	(Turkey)	58	Ziya Erdal	1	0	1
11	FW	(Turkey)	9	Abdulkadir Özgen	0	1	1
11	MF	(Poland)	10	Kamil Grosicki	0	1	1
				TOTALS	60	15	75

=== Disciplinary record ===
Number	Nation	Position	Name	Süper Lig		Turkish Cup		Total	
Number	Nation	Position	Name	Yellow card	Red card	Yellow card	Red card	Yellow card	Red card
4	(Turkey)	MF	Murat Akça	1	0	1	0	2	0
7	(Brazil)	FW	Pedro Oldoni	0	0	2	1	2	1
8	(Turkey)	MF	Kadir Bekmezci	7	0	2	0	9	0
12	(Brazil)	DF	Cicinho	5	1	3	0	8	1
17	(Azerbaijan)	FW	Cihan Özkara	2	0	1	0	3	0
20	(Czech Republic)	DF	Jakub Navrátil	2	0	2	0	4	0
21	(Turkey)	MF	Burhan Eşer	6	0	1	0	7	0
22	(Morocco)	DF	Manuel da Costa	11	3	1	0	12	3
23	(Turkey)	GK	Nihat Sahin	1	0	0	0	1	0
34	(Turkey)	DF	Eren Aydın	1	0	3	0	4	0
37	(Turkey)	MF	Hakan Arslan	1	0	3	0	4	0
45	(Algeria)	MF	Rafik Djebbour	2	0	0	0	2	0
58	(Turkey)	DF	Ziya Erdal	7	0	0	0	7	0
66	(Turkey)	MF	Adem Koçak	1	0	0	0	1	0
80	(Turkey)	DF	Ümit Kurt	5	2	1	0	6	2
82	(Turkey)	MF	Aydın Karabulut	4	0	1	0	5	0
91	(Morocco)	MF	Mehdi Taouil	4	0	0	0	4	0
92	(Morocco)	FW	Aatif Chahechouhe	3	0	0	0	3	0
99	(Nigeria)	FW	John Utaka	1	0	1	0	2	0
			TOTALS	64	6	22	1	86	7
