= Aykut Öztürk =

Turkish-German footballer

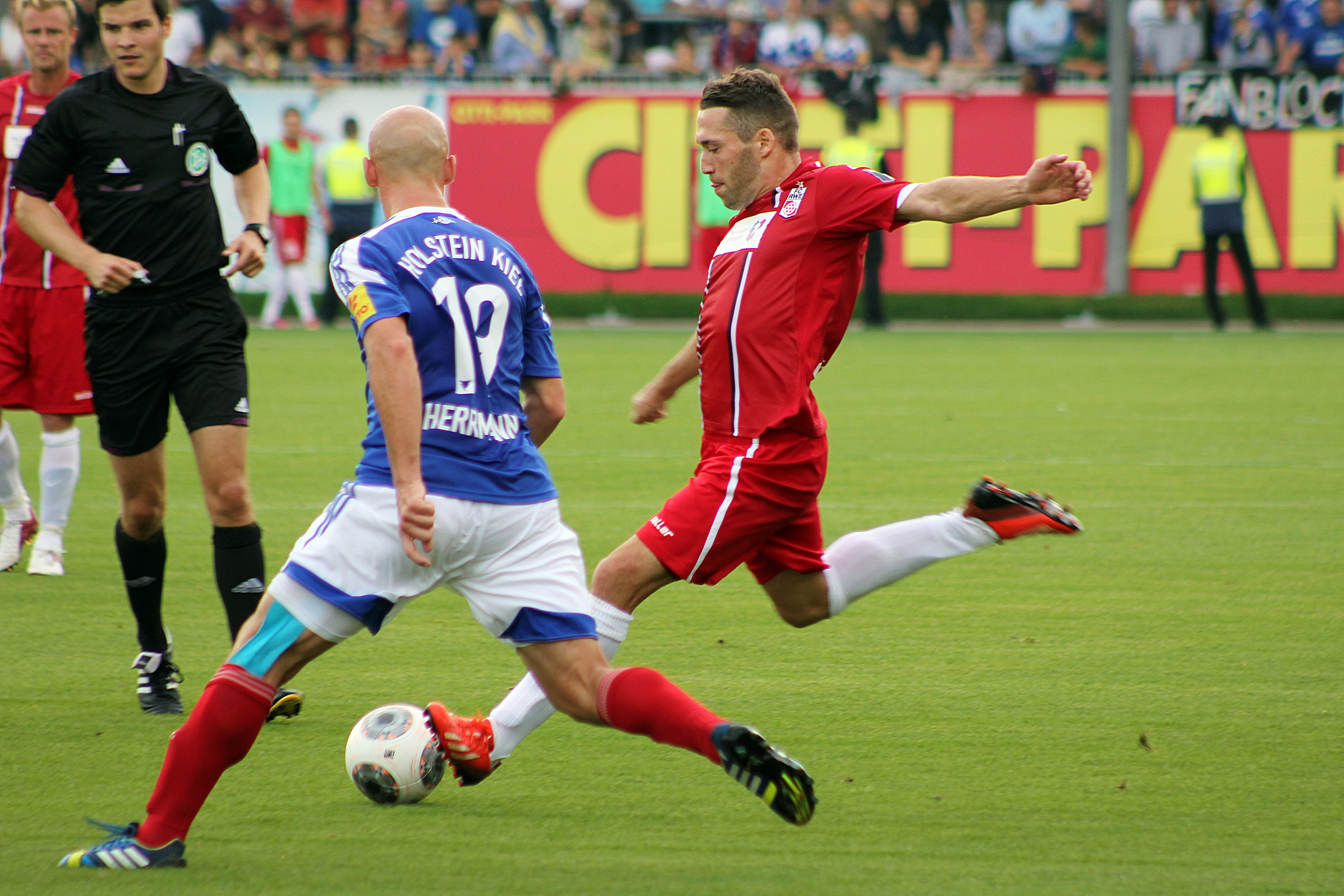

Personal information
- Date of birth: 7 November 1987 (age 39)
- Place of birth: Ehringshausen, West Germany
- Height: 1.82 m (6 ft 0 in)
- Position: Left winger

Youth career
- VfB Gießen
- VfB Aßlar

Senior career*
Years	Team	Apps	(Gls)
2006–2007	VfB Aßlar	30	(32)
2007–2010	SV Wehen Wiesbaden II	53	(21)
2008–2010	SV Wehen Wiesbaden	44	(8)
2010	Konyaspor	0	(0)
2010	Eintracht Wetzlar	7	(2)
2011	Carl Zeiss Jena	16	(4)
2011–2012	SV Sandhausen	19	(2)
2012–2014	Rot-Weiß Erfurt	48	(7)
2014	Sivasspor	5	(0)
2015	Jahn Regensburg	7	(0)
2015–2018	FSV Zwickau	61	(10)
2018–2019	Orduspor	19	(2)
2019–2023	FC Gießen	59	(8)
- * Club domestic league appearances and goals

Aykut Öztürk (born 7 November 1987) is a Turkish-German former professional footballer who played as a left winger.

== Early life ==
Öztürk was born to Turkish parents in Ehringshausen and raised in Aßlar.

== Career ==
He made his debut on the professional league level in the 2. Bundesliga for SV Wehen Wiesbaden on 18 May 2008 when he came on as a substitute in the 86th minute in a game against SC Freiburg. On 25 June 2010, Öztürk left SV Wehen Wiesbaden and signed in the land of his forefathers Turkey with Konyaspor. After two months with Konyaspor, he returned to Germany and played for Eintracht Wetzlar. On 2 February 2011, Öztürk signed with 3. Liga club FC Carl Zeiss Jena and scored in his first game his debut goal in 3–0 home victory against SV Sandhausen, the club he joined only a few months later.

After being released by Sivasspor in summer 2014, Öztürk was without a club for roughly half a year. After two weeks being on trial, on 26 January 2015, he was given a contract by then last placed 3. Liga side Jahn Regensburg. He signed for the remainder of the season with an extension clause in case of Regensburg staying in the league. After Regensburg was relegated, he joined FSV Zwickau.

== Career statistics ==
As of 28 January 2018

Appearances and goals by club, season and competition
Club	Season	League			National Cup		League Cup		Other		Total	
Club	Season	Division	Apps	Goals	Apps	Goals	Apps	Goals	Apps	Goals	Apps	Goals
SV Wehen Wiesbaden II	2008–09	Regionalliga Süd	22	8	0	0	0	0	0	0	22	8
SV Wehen Wiesbaden II	2009–10	Regionalliga Süd	5	0	0	0	0	0	0	0	5	0
SV Wehen Wiesbaden II	Total		27	8	0	0	0	0	0	0	27	8
SV Wehen Wiesbaden	2008–09	2. Bundesliga	9	1	0	0	0	0	0	0	9	1
SV Wehen Wiesbaden	2009–10	3. Liga	33	6	1	0	0	0	0	0	34	6
SV Wehen Wiesbaden	Total		42	7	1	0	0	0	0	0	43	7
FC Carl Zeiss Jena	2010–11	3. Liga	16	4	0	0	0	0	0	0	16	4
SV Sandhausen	2011–12	3. Liga	19	2	1	0	0	0	0	0	20	2
RW Erfurt	2012–13	3. Liga	29	3	0	0	0	0	0	0	29	3
RW Erfurt	2013–14	3. Liga	19	4	0	0	0	0	0	0	19	4
RW Erfurt	Total		48	7	0	0	0	0	0	0	48	7
Sivasspor	2013–14	Süper Lig	5	0	1	0	0	0	0	0	6	0
SSV Jahn Regensburg	2014–15	3. Liga	7	0	0	0	0	0	0	0	7	0
FSV Zwickau	2015–16	Regionalliga Nordost	27	8	0	0	0	0	0	0	27	8
FSV Zwickau	2016–17	3. Liga	14	1	0	0	0	0	0	0	14	1
FSV Zwickau	2017–18	3. Liga	14	1	0	0	0	0	0	0	14	1
FSV Zwickau	Total		55	10	0	0	0	0	0	0	55	10
Career totals			219	38	3	0	0	0	0	0	222	38
