= Ümit Kurt =

Ümit Kurt may refer to:

- Ümit Kurt (footballer)
- Ümit Kurt (historian)
