= Ahmet Şahbaz =

Turkish footballer

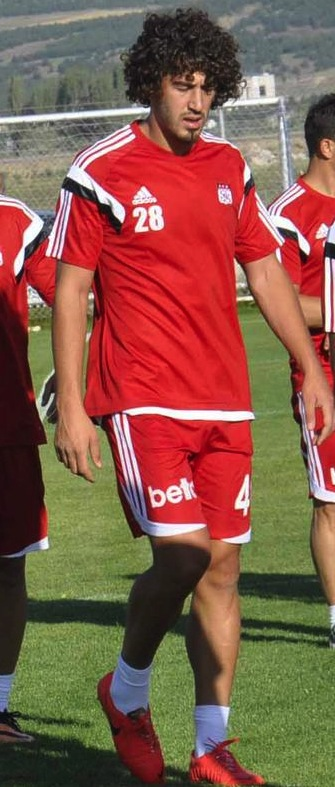

Personal information
- Date of birth: 12 March 1991 (age 35)
- Place of birth: Andırın, Turkey
- Height: 1.86 m (6 ft 1 in)
- Position: Defender

Team information
- Current team: Talasgücü Belediyespor
- Number: 12

Youth career
- 2004–2007: Kahramanmaraş BŞB
- 2007–2009: Kahramanmaraşspor

Senior career*
Years	Team	Apps	(Gls)
2009–2011	Kahramanmaraşspor	25	(2)
2011–2012	Beylerbeyi	24	(2)
2012–2013	Arsinspor	30	(0)
2013–2014	Silivrispor	16	(0)
2014–2015	Sivasspor	7	(0)
2015–2016	Alanyaspor	18	(0)
2016	Tokatspor	10	(0)
2016–2017	Kırklarelispor	9	(0)
2017	→ Çorum FK (loan)	7	(1)
2017–2018	Ankara Demirspor	22	(0)
2018	Van BB	8	(0)
2019	Karaköprü Belediyespor	13	(0)
2019	Çankaya FK	6	(0)
2020	Fatsa Belediyespor	9	(0)
2020–2021	Ceyhanspor	23	(1)
2021–2022	Serik Belediyespor	7	(0)
2022	Turgutluspor	14	(0)
2022	Beykoz İshaklı Spor		
2022–	Talasgücü Belediyespor	2	(0)
- * Club domestic league appearances and goals as of 23 September 2023

Ahmet Şahbaz (born 12 March 1991) is a Turkish footballer who plays as a defender for TFF Third League club Talasgücü Belediyespor.

== Career ==
He made his Süper Lig debut on 26 January 2014.
