= Abdulkadir Özgen =

Turkish-German footballer

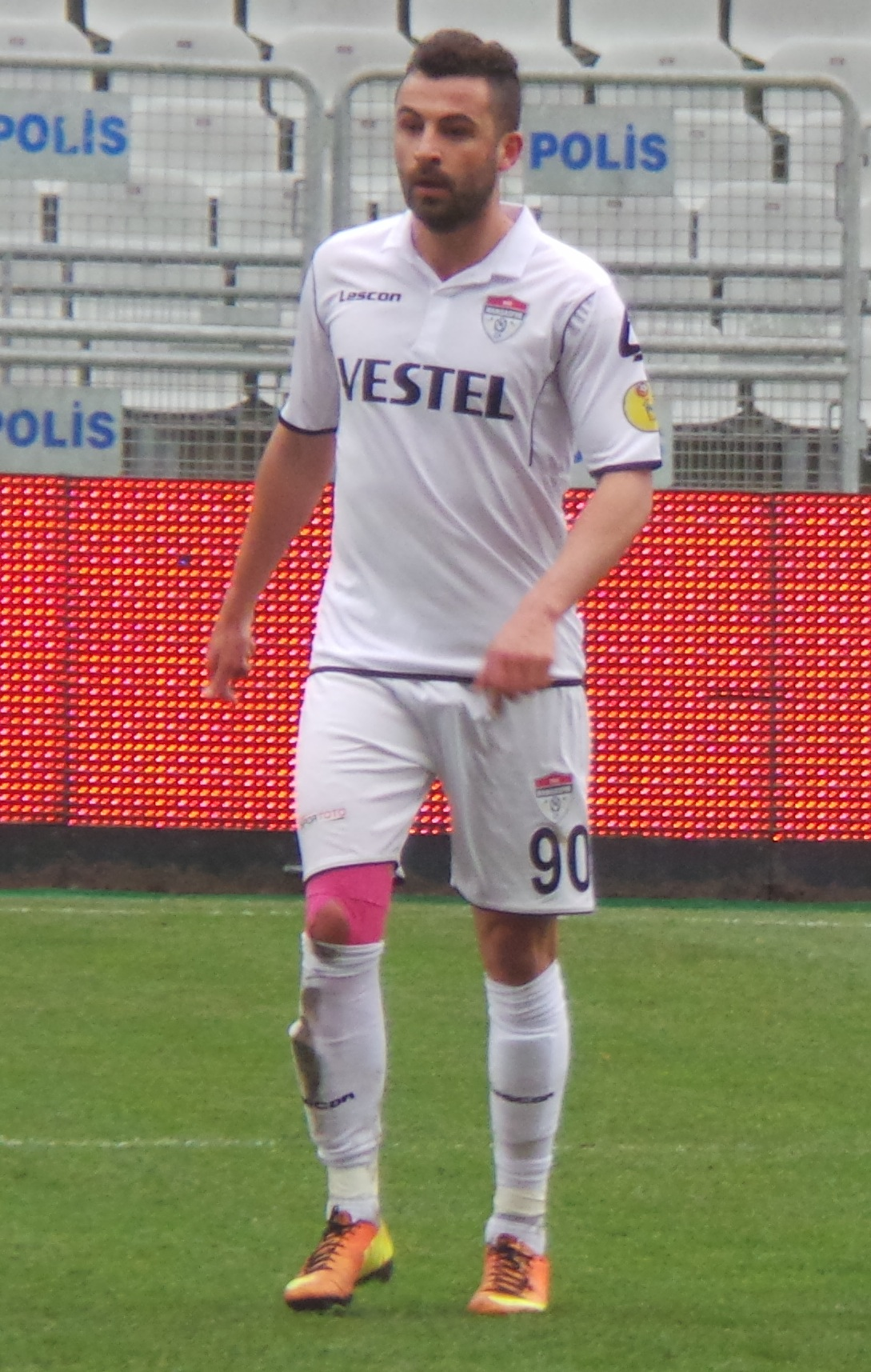

Personal information
- Date of birth: 8 September 1986 (age 40)
- Place of birth: Stolberg, West Germany
- Height: 1.86 m (6 ft 1 in)
- Position: Forward

Youth career
- 1992–2001: TSV Donnerberg
- 2001–2006: SV Breinig
- 2006–2008: Alemannia Aachen

Senior career*
Years	Team	Apps	(Gls)
2008–2010	Alemannia Aachen	18	(2)
2010–2011	Kayserispor	9	(0)
2011–2012	Bucaspor	36	(20)
2012–2014	Sivasspor	8	(0)
2013	→ Samsunspor (loan)	14	(9)
2014	→ Manisaspor (loan)	18	(12)
2014–2015	Şanlıurfaspor	39	(10)
2015–2016	Adana Demirspor	10	(3)
2016–2019	Balıkesirspor	60	(22)
2019	Samsunspor	16	(6)
2020	Kırşehir Belediyespor	7	(1)
2020	24 Erzincanspor	8	(0)
2021–2022	Balıkesirspor	22	(2)
2022	Bayrampaşa	11	(1)
- * Club domestic league appearances and goals as of 7 May 2022

Abdulkadir Özgen (born 8 September 1986) is a Turkish-German professional footballer who plays as a forward.

== Career ==
Özgen began his career with TSV Donnerberg and SV Breinig. In 2006, he joined Alemannia Aachen where he signed his first professional contract. In summer 2010, he joined Kayserispor and moved to Bucaspor in January 2011.

On 28 December 2015 it was confirmed, that Özgen had signed for Adana Demirspor.

In August 2016, Özgen joined Balıkesirspor.

== Personal life ==
Özgen's family immigrated to Germany from Turkey, but his birthplace is the North Rhine-Westphalia city of Stolberg.
