= İbrahim Sürgülü =

Turkish footballer

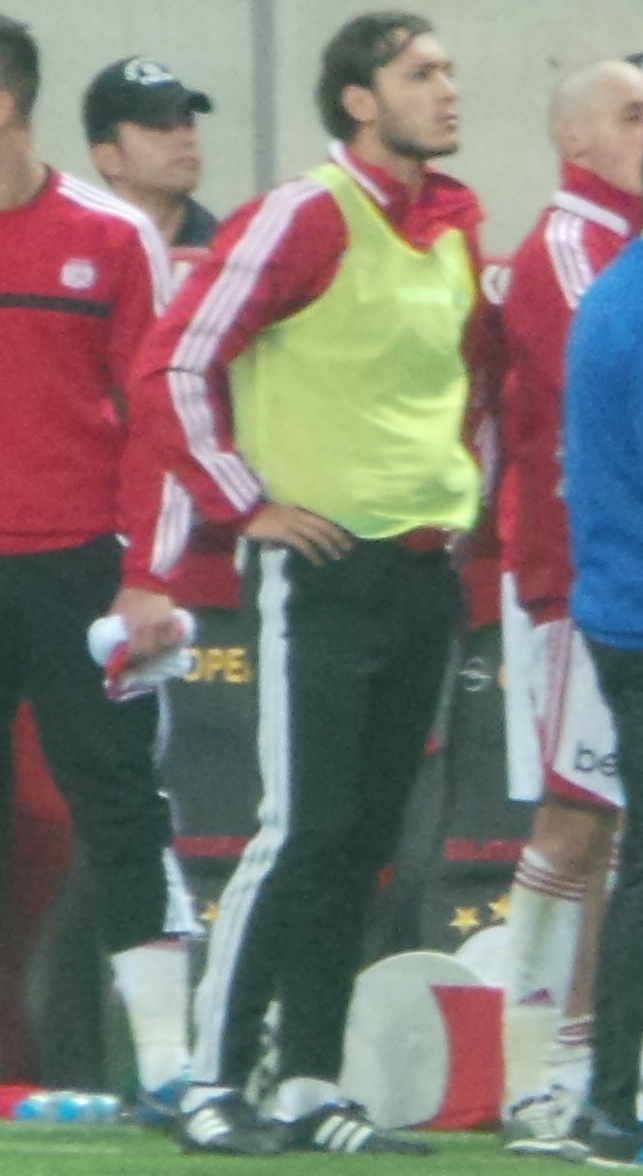
- Sürgülü in 2013

Personal information
- Date of birth: 4 April 1993 (age 33)
- Place of birth: Polatlı, Turkey
- Height: 1.87 m (6 ft 2 in)
- Position: Centre-back

Team information
- Current team: Şanlıurfaspor
- Number: 39

Youth career
- 2004–2008: Ankaragücü
- 2008–2009: Yenimahalle Bld.
- 2009–2011: Bugsaşspor
- 2011–2013: Ankaraspor
- 2013–2014: Sivasspor

Senior career*
Years	Team	Apps	(Gls)
2013–2014	Sivasspor	1	(0)
2014	→ Fethiyespor (loan)	1	(0)
2014	Körfez İskenderunspor	6	(0)
2015	Fethiyespor	18	(2)
2015	Bursaspor	0	(0)
2015	→ Yeşil Bursa SK (loan)	9	(0)
2016	Anadolu Selçukspor	4	(0)
2016–2017	Afjet Afyonspor	4	(0)
2017	TM Kırıkkalespor	13	(1)
2017	Kırklarelispor	16	(0)
2018	Amed	12	(0)
2018	Ankara Demirspor	17	(0)
2019	Sivas Belediyespor	12	(2)
2019–2021	Kırklarelispor	63	(6)
2021–2022	İnegölspor	37	(12)
2022–2023	Şanlıurfaspor	24	(1)
2023–2024	Ankaraspor	36	(2)
2024–2025	1461 Trabzon	18	(0)
2025–2026	İnegölspor	4	(0)
2026–	Şanlıurfaspor	4	(0)
- * Club domestic league appearances and goals as of 1 October 2026

İbrahim Sürgülü (born 4 April 1993) is a Turkish footballer who plays as a centre-back for TFF 2. Lig club Şanlıurfaspor. He made his Süper Lig debut on 4 November 2013.
