= Aydın Karabulut =

Turkish footballer

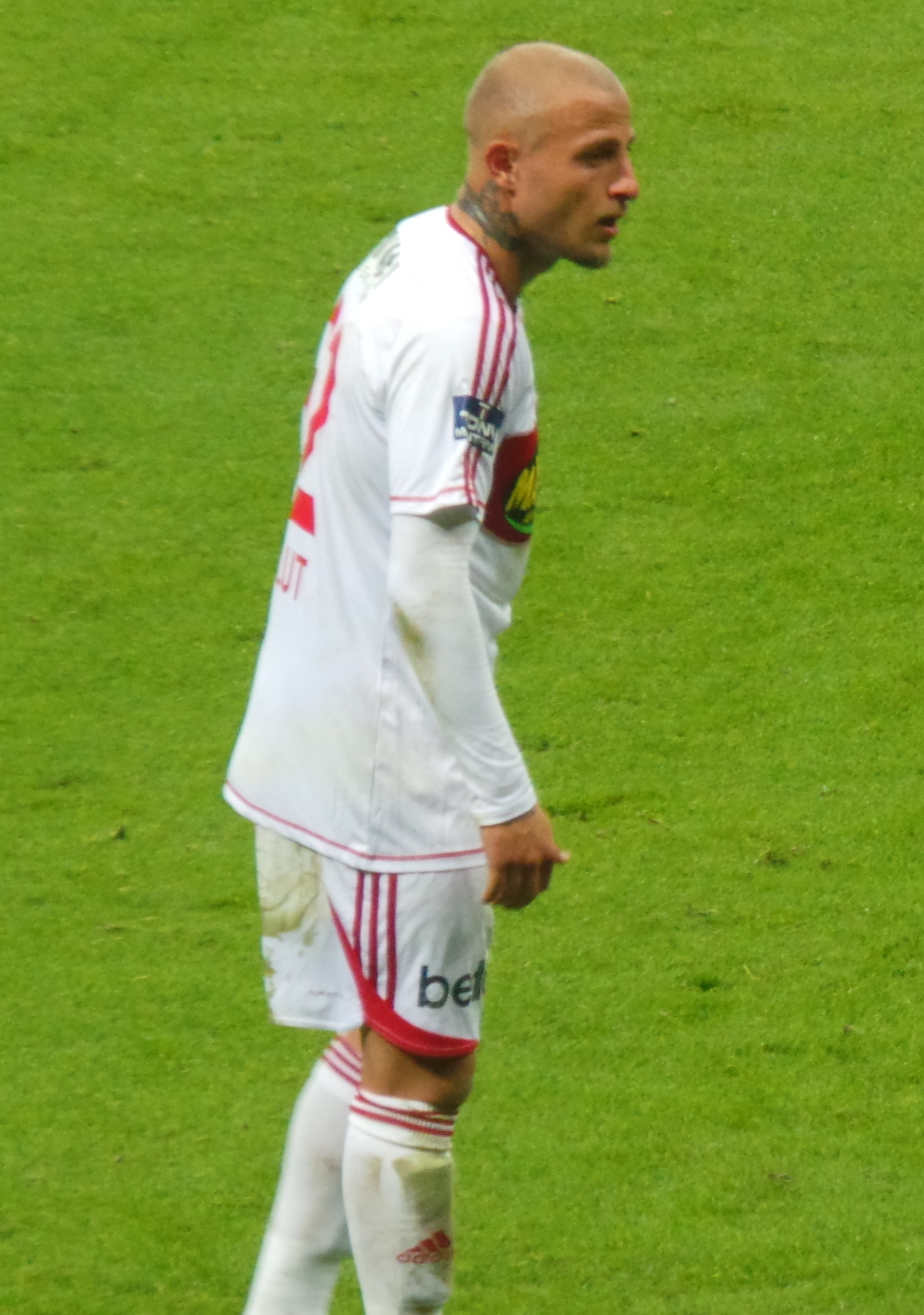
- Aydın with Sivasspor in 2013

Personal information
- Full name: Aydın Karabulut
- Date of birth: January 25, 1988 (age 38)
- Place of birth: Berlin, Germany
- Height: 1.78 m (5 ft 10 in)
- Position: Left winger

Youth career
- Hertha Berlin

Senior career*
| Years | Team | Apps | (Gls) |
| 2006–2009 | Beşiktaş | 17 | (1) |
| 2009–2010 | Ankaraspor | 4 | (0) |
| 2009–2010 | → Ankaragücü (loan) | 7 | (1) |
| 2011 | Karabükspor | 3 | (0) |
| 2011–2012 | Göztepe | 16 | (0) |
| 2012–2013 | Elazığspor | 25 | (0) |
| 2013–2014 | Sivasspor | 30 | (4) |
| 2014–2015 | Bursaspor | 2 | (0) |
| 2015 | → Sivasspor (loan) | 1 | (0) |
| 2016–2017 | Gençlerbirliği | 42 | (3) |
| 2017–2018 | Antalyaspor | 9 | (1) |
| 2018 | Gençlerbirliği | 13 | (0) |
| 2018–2019 | Sivasspor | 1 | (0) |
| 2019–2020 | Ankaragücü | 21 | (1) |
| 2020–2021 | Kocaelispor | 4 | (0) |
| 2021 | Ankaraspor | 1 | (0) |

International career
| 2007 | Turkey U18 | 8 | (0) |
| 2007–2008 | Turkey U19 | 5 | (0) |
| 2008–2009 | Turkey U21 | 4 | (2) |
- * Club domestic league appearances and goals as of 3 August 2022

Aydın Karabulut (born 25 January 1988) is a Turkish footballer who last played as an attacking midfielder for Ankaraspor.

== Career ==
Aydın had started his career in Hertha Berlin, one of the leading teams in German capital where he was born. After a while, he pulled the attention of Turkey national team scouts as a promising starlet. He had 5 caps for U-19 national team. He joined Beşiktaş January 2006. His contract came into force on 8 February 2006 which will expire in May 2010. Aydın had several recent occasions on Süper Lig in first season mostly as a substitute player.

On 16 February 2008, he was on the line-up of team up against Ankaraspor where Aydın assisted Nobre by his corner kick. Subsequently, he tried to find the net by his own again with a corner kick, however he was denied by the opponent keeper Senecký after his direct curving shoot. He scored his first ever goal for Beşiktaş on 5 January 2008 in Fortis Turkey Cup group match against Diyarbakır BŞB. Aydın kept playing as a substitute player for his team and scored his very first goal in Turkish League on a crucial encounter against Trabzonspor.

Aydın has joined capital city team Ankaraspor in summer 2009, in return of Erhan Güven, who joined Beşiktaş as the new defender.

On 6 September 2013, Karabulut left Elazığspor and joined fellow Super Lig side Sivasspor. During the transfer window of the 2014–2015 season, he signed for Bursaspor.
