= Ahmet Aras =

Turkish footballer

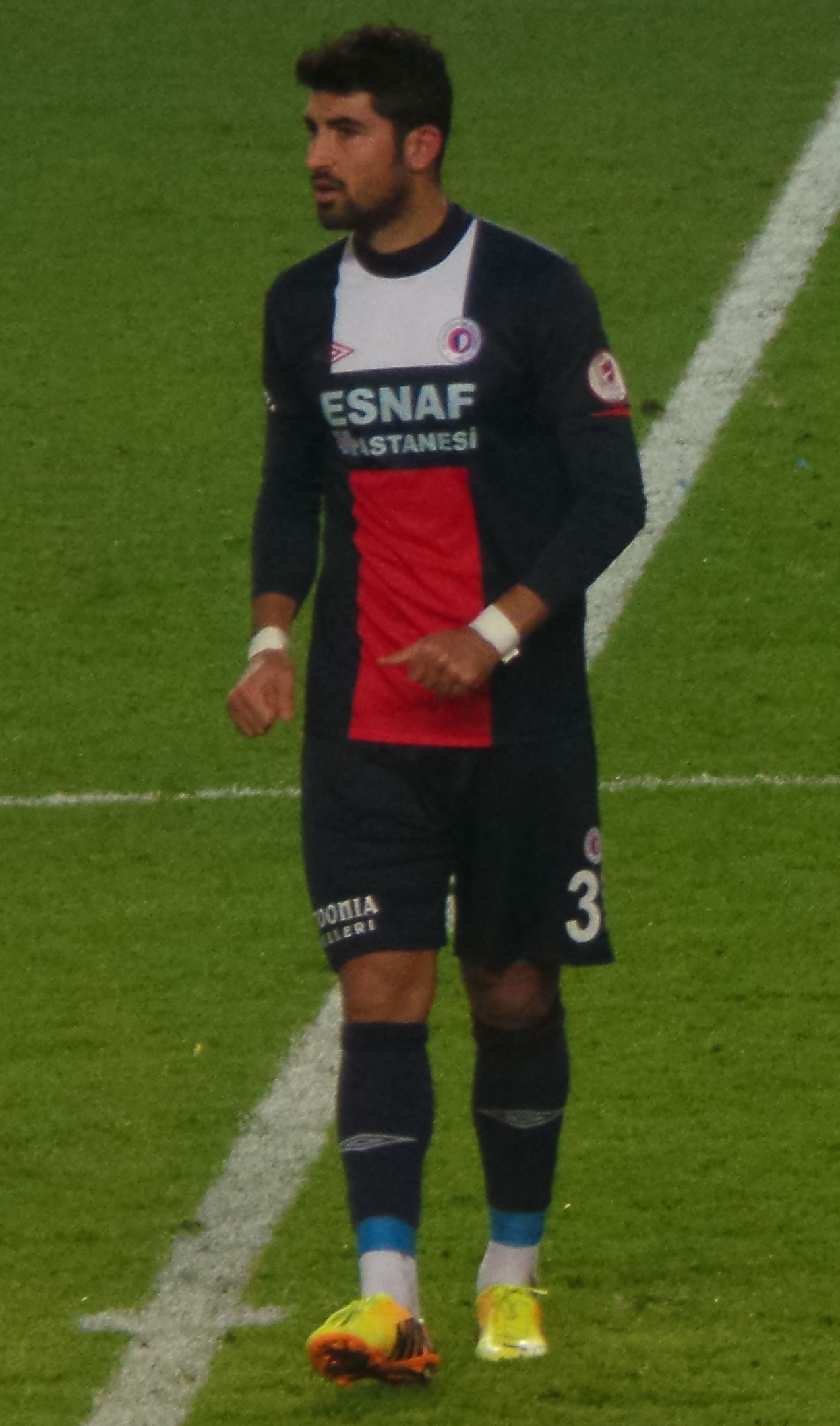
- Ahmet Aras in 2013

Personal information
- Full name: Ahmet Aras
- Date of birth: December 13, 1987 (age 38)
- Place of birth: Mardin, Turkey
- Height: 1.87 m (6 ft 2 in)
- Position: Forward

Team information
- Current team: 1928 Bucaspor

Youth career
- Çeşme Belediyespor
- Manisaspor

Senior career*
Years	Team	Apps	(Gls)
2006–2008	Manisaspor	0	(0)
2007	→ Muğlaspor (loan)	2	(0)
2007–2008	→ İstanbulspor (loan)	8	(0)
2008	→ İzmirspor (loan)	10	(5)
2008	Pendikspor	4	(0)
2009–2010	Izmirspor	26	(6)
2010–2011	Bucaspor	0	(0)
2011	Bursa Nilüfer	16	(6)
2011	Ankara Demirspor	15	(7)
2012	İnegölspor	7	(0)
2012–2013	Üsküdar Anadolu SK	21	(14)
2013–2015	Sivasspor	12	(2)
2013–2014	→ Fethiyespor (loan)	31	(15)
2015–2017	Antalyaspor	15	(6)
2016	→ Şanlıurfaspor (loan)	17	(7)
2017	Yeni Malatyaspor	9	(1)
2017–2018	Elazığspor	29	(10)
2019–2020	Fatih Karagümrük	23	(4)
2020–	1928 Bucaspor	7	(1)
- * Club domestic league appearances and goals as of 1 July 2021

Ahmet Aras (born 13 December 1987) is a Turkish professional footballer who plays as a forward for 1928 Bucaspor.
