= Kayseri Atatürk Stadium =

Football stadium in Kayseri, Turkey

Coordinates: 38°43′23″N 35°29′48″E

- Interactive map of Kayseri Atatürk Stadium
- Location: Kayseri, Turkey
- Owner: Gençlik ve Spor Genel Müdürlüğü (General Directorate of Youth and Sports)
- Capacity: 25,918
- Surface: Grass

Construction
- Groundbreaking: 1956; 70 years ago
- Opened: 1960
- Closed: 2009
- Demolished: January 16, 2009

Tenants
- Kayserispor, Kayseri Erciyesspor

Kayseri Atatürk Stadium, opened in 1960, was a multi-purpose stadium in Kayseri, Turkey. It was mainly used for football matches, and was shared by the two largest clubs in the region, Kayserispor who currently play in the Süper Lig and Kayseri Erciyesspor who became dissolved. The stadium was able to hold 25,918 seated people, and was mostly uncovered.

During a match between Kayserispor and Sivasspor on September 17, 1967, it was the location of the worst sporting-related disaster in Turkey.

In 2009, it was replaced by Kadir Has Stadium, located on a different site with a capacity of 32,864 seats. Kayseri Atatürk Stadium was demolished and its land will host the multi-use real estate project Forum Kayseri of Dutch Multi Corporation, including a shopping mall, hotel, offices, and residential buildings.
