= Murat Akça =

Turkish footballer (born 1990)

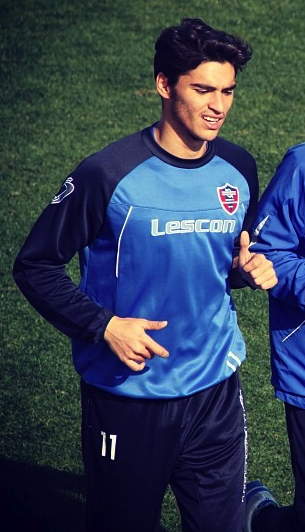

Personal information
- Date of birth: 13 July 1990 (age 36)
- Place of birth: Stuttgart, Germany
- Height: 1.84 m (6 ft 0 in)
- Position: Centre back

Team information
- Current team: Yalova FK 77 SK
- Number: 28

Youth career
- 2001–2007: Galatasaray

Senior career*
Years	Team	Apps	(Gls)
2007–2010	Galatasaray A2	37	(5)
2008–2010	Galatasaray	0	(0)
2010–2011	Denizlispor	0	(0)
2010–2011	→ Adana Demirspor (loan)	28	(1)
2011–2014	Sivasspor	26	(0)
2014–2016	Karabükspor	38	(3)
2016–2019	Yeni Malatyaspor	44	(0)
2018	→ Elazığspor (loan)	11	(0)
2019–2020	Giresunspor	16	(0)
2020–2021	Yeni Malatyaspor	4	(0)
2021–2022	Altay	41	(1)
2022–2025	Pendikspor	53	(0)
2025–	Yalova FK 77 SK	8	(0)

International career
2005	Turkey U15	1	(0)
2005–2006	Turkey U16	16	(0)
2006–2007	Turkey U17	19	(0)
2007–2008	Turkey U18	24	(0)
2008–2009	Turkey U19	7	(0)
2011–2012	Turkey U21	4	(0)
- * Club domestic league appearances and goals as of 9 November 2025

Murat Akça (born 13 July 1990) is a footballer who plays as a central defender for TFF 3. Lig club Yalova FK 77 SK. He has been trained by the Galatasaray youth department. Born in Germany, he represented Turkey at various youth levels.
