= Adem Koçak =

Turkish footballer

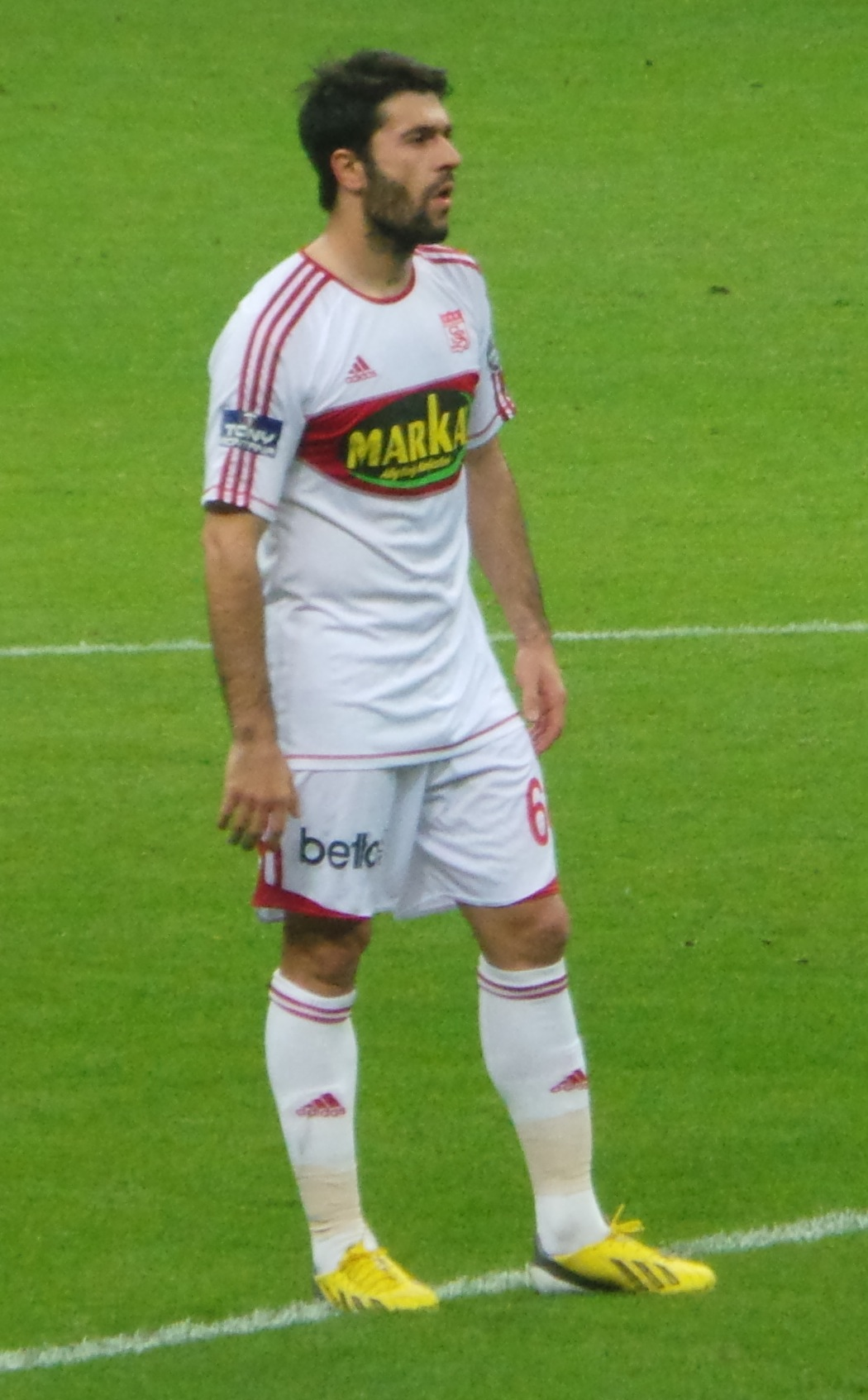

Personal information
- Date of birth: 1 September 1983 (age 43)
- Place of birth: Yerköy, Yozgat, Turkey
- Height: 1.81 m (5 ft 11 1/2 in)
- Position: Midfielder

Senior career*
Years	Team	Apps	(Gls)
2000–2004	Ankaragücü	35	(0)
2004–2006	Trabzonspor	56	(3)
2006–2011	Ankaraspor	92	(3)
2009–2011	→ Ankaragücü (loan)	48	(0)
2011–2012	Bursaspor	34	(0)
2012–2017	Sivasspor	136	(1)
2017	Bandırmaspor	13	(0)
2018–2022	Sarıyer	114	(2)

International career
2000–2001	Turkey U17	3	(2)
2001	Turkey U19	4	(0)
2002–2003	Turkey U20	7	(0)
2004–2005	Turkey U21	22	(0)
- * Club domestic league appearances and goals

Adem Koçak (born 1 September 1983) is a Turkish former footballer who played as a midfielder.
