= Fatih Kıran =

Turkish footballer

Fatih Kiran
Personal information
- Date of birth: 26 March 1993 (age 33)
- Place of birth: Munich, Germany
- Height: 1.77 m (5 ft 10 in)
- Position: Midfielder

Team information
- Current team: 1923 Afyonkarahisar

Youth career
- SpVgg 1906 Haidhausen
- SpVgg Unterhaching
- 2010–2012: FC Augsburg

Senior career*
Years	Team	Apps	(Gls)
2012–2013	FC Augsburg II	18	(0)
2013–2014	FC Ismaning	7	(1)
2014–2016	Sivasspor	1	(0)
2014–2015	→ Göztepe (loan)	23	(0)
2015–2016	→ Sivas Belediyespor (loan)	30	(0)
2016–2017	Kocaeli Birlik Spor	7	(0)
2017–2019	Bandırmaspor	31	(0)
2019	Türkspor Augsburg		
2020–2021	Yomraspor	24	(11)
2021	Nevşehir Belediyespor	14	(1)
2021–2022	23 Elazığ FK	34	(4)
2022–2023	Kırşehir FK	17	(0)
2023–2024	Elazığspor	44	(1)
2024–2025	Amasyaspor FK	27	(2)
2025–	1923 Afyonkarahisar		
- * Club domestic league appearances and goals as of 26 April 2025

Fatih Kiran (born 26 March 1993) is a German footballer who plays as a midfielder for Turkish amateur side 1923 Afyonkarahisar.
