= Kadir Bekmezci =

Belgian footballer

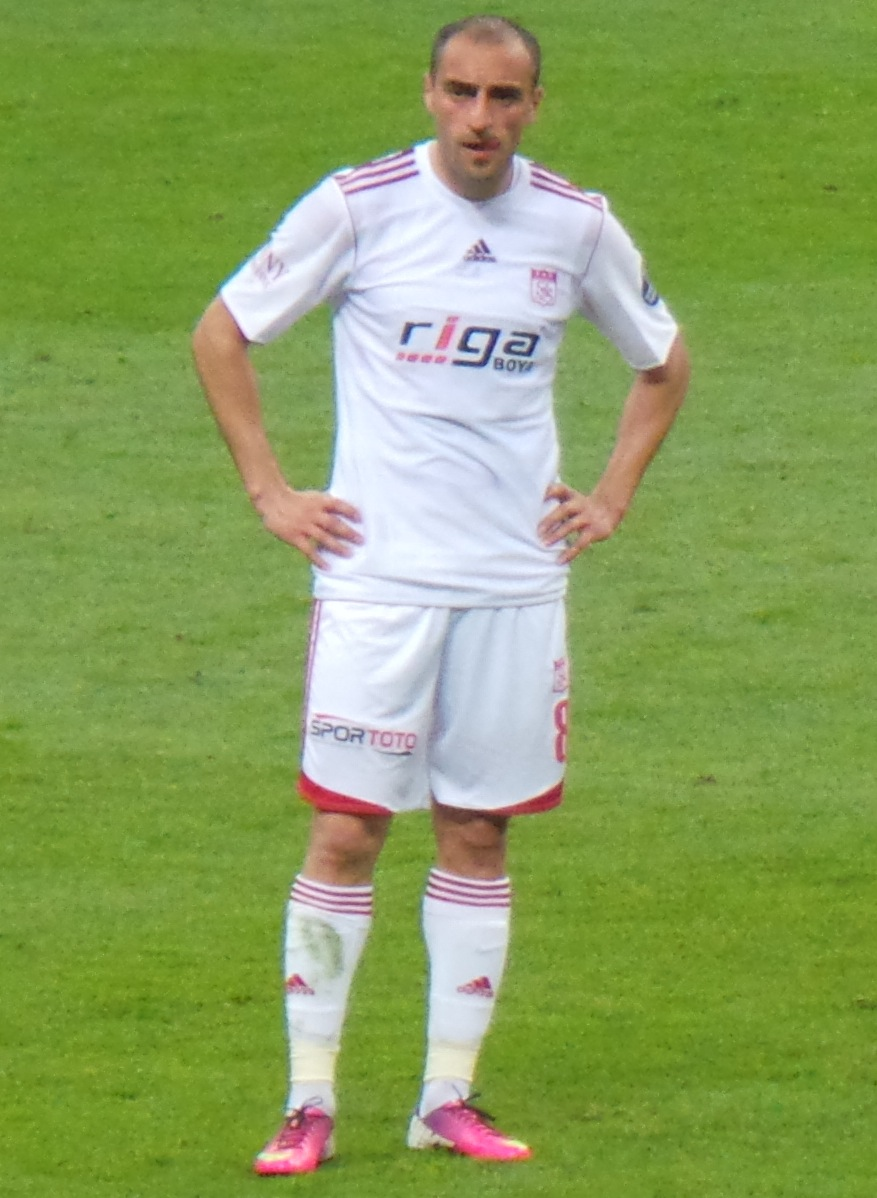
- Kadir Bekmezci in 2013

Personal information
- Date of birth: 5 July 1985 (age 41)
- Place of birth: Genk, Belgium
- Height: 1.83 m (6 ft 0 in)
- Position: Attacking midfielder

Team information
- Current team: Devrek Belediyespor

Youth career
- –2005: Standard Liège

Senior career*
Years	Team	Apps	(Gls)
2005	Beringen-Heusden-Zolder	19	(0)
2005	Eupen		
2006–2007	Geel	3	(0)
2007–2009	Hacettepe	62	(2)
2009–2015	Sivasspor	179	(4)
2015–2016	Antalyaspor	17	(0)
2017	Boluspor	16	(1)
2017–2021	Elazığspor	101	(7)
2021–	Devrek Belediyespor		
- * Club domestic league appearances and goals as of 8 May 2021

Kadir Bekmezci (born 5 July 1985) is a Belgian professional footballer who plays as an attacking midfielder for Turkish amateur side Devrek Belediyespor.

== Club career ==
Bekmezci, born in Belgium, formerly played for Standard Liège. He also played for several other Belgian clubs, including K. Beringen-Heusden-Zolder, K.A.S. Eupen, and K.F.C. Verbroedering Geel. Hacettepe transferred Bekmezci in August 2007. He spent two years at the club before Sivasspor acquired his services in August 2009.
