= Eren Aydın =

Turkish footballer

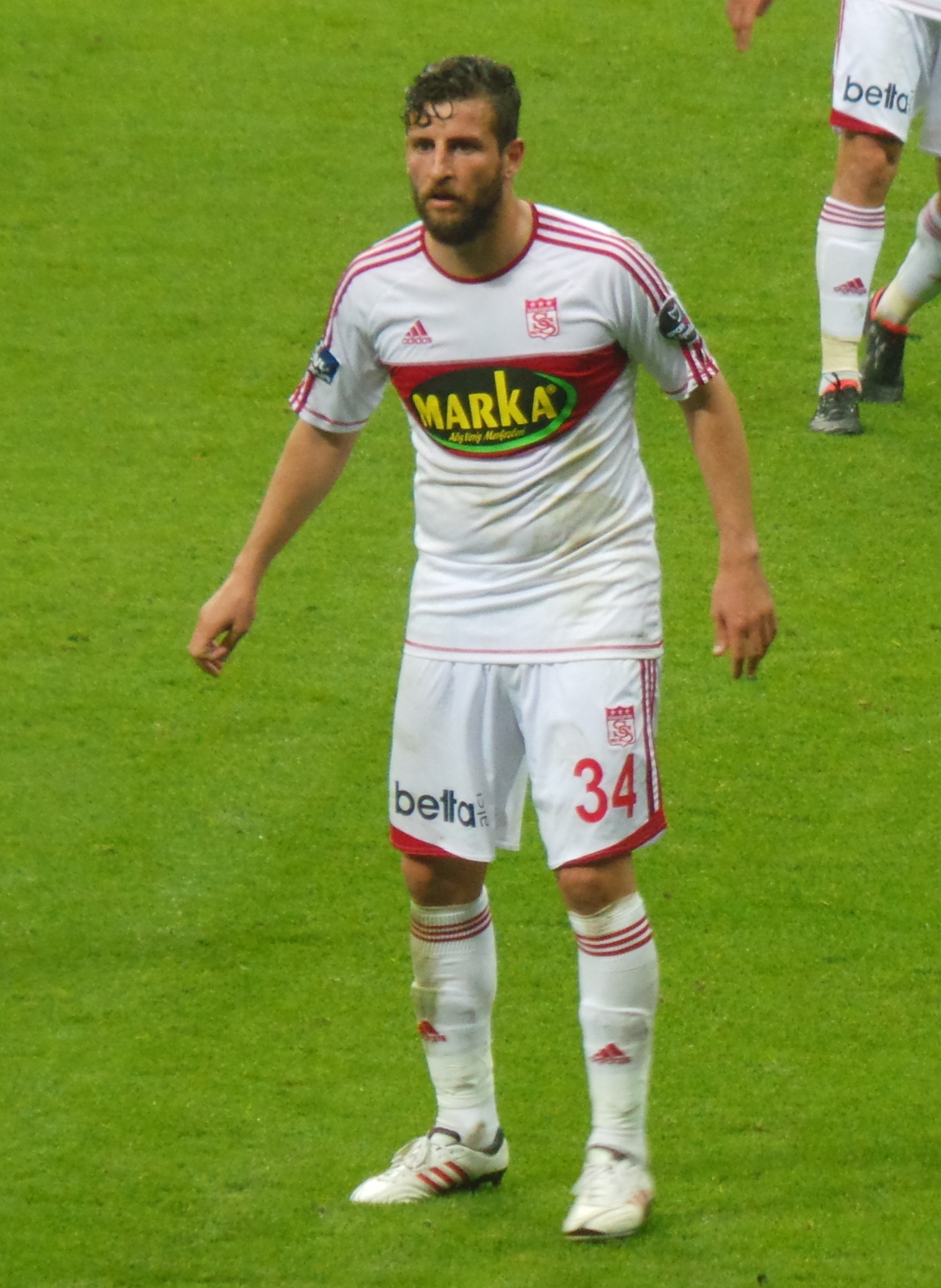
- Eren Aydın in 2013

Personal information
- Date of birth: 16 January 1982 (age 44)
- Place of birth: Beykoz, Istanbul, Turkey
- Height: 1.82 m (6 ft 0 in)
- Positions: Left back; defender

Youth career
- 1999–2000: Paşabahçe

Senior career*
Years	Team	Apps	(Gls)
2001	Paşabahçe	0	(0)
2001–2002	Batman Petrolspor	14	(0)
2002–2004	Etimesgut Şekerspor	47	(4)
2004–2005	Malatyaspor	37	(0)
2006–2008	Gençlerbirliği	61	(0)
2008–2009	Ankaraspor	8	(0)
2009	Gençlerbirliği	4	(0)
2009–2011	Manisaspor	51	(1)
2011–2012	İstanbul B.B.	10	(1)
2012–2013	Eyüpspor	10	(3)
2013	Elazığspor	6	(0)
2013–2014	Sivasspor	3	(0)
2014–2015	Elazığspor	25	(1)
2015–2016	Boluspor	6	(0)

Managerial career
- 2017: Gençlerbirliği (assistant)
- 2017–2018: Gençlerbirliği (assistant)
- 2019: Giresunspor (assistant)
- 2019: Adana Demirspor (assistant)
- 2020: Adana Demirspor (assistant)
- * Club domestic league appearances and goals

Eren Aydın (born 16 January 1982) is a Turkish football coach and a former player. He played as a left back. As a coach, he works as an assistant to Ümit Özat.
