= Alican Karadağ =

Turkish footballer

Personal information
- Date of birth: 8 January 1990 (age 36)
- Place of birth: Altındağ, Turkey
- Height: 1.90 m (6 ft 3 in)
- Position: Midfielder

Youth career
- 2001–2003: Gençlerbirliği
- 2003–2004: Hacettepe
- 2004–2005: Gençlerbirliği
- 2005–2007: Hacettepe
- 2007–2009: Gençlerbirliği

Senior career*
Years	Team	Apps	(Gls)
2009	Gençlerbirliği	0	(0)
2009–2010	Osmanlıspor	0	(0)
2009–2010	→ Bugsaşspor (loan)	29	(0)
2010	1461 Trabzon	9	(0)
2011	Çubukspor	15	(2)
2011–2012	Keçiörengücü	33	(1)
2012–2015	Sivasspor	0	(0)
2013	→ Fethiyespor (loan)	14	(4)
2013–2014	→ Boluspor (loan)	31	(3)
2014–2015	→ Giresunspor (loan)	32	(4)
2015–2016	Boluspor	28	(3)
2016–2017	Şanlıurfaspor	12	(0)
2017	Adana Demirspor	12	(2)
2017–2018	Kastamonuspor	12	(5)
2018	Karabükspor	7	(0)
2018–2019	Fethiyespor	28	(4)
2019–2020	Kastamonuspor 1966	33	(2)
2021–2022	Kahramanmaraşspor	28	(2)
2022–2023	Ankaraspor	4	(0)
- * Club domestic league appearances and goals as of 20 May 2023

Alican Karadağ (born 8 January 1990) is a Turkish professional footballer who plays as a midfielder.

== Professional career ==
Karadağ spent most of his playing career in the TFF First League and TFF Second League, playing over 120 games in the lower divisions of Turkey. On 8 January 2018, he signed with Kardemir Karabükspor after a successful half season at Kastamonuspor where he scored 5 goals in 12 games. Karadağ made his professional debut with Kardemir Karabükspor in a 3-2 Süper Lig loss to Kayserispor on 11 March 2018.
