= Kayseri Atatürk Stadium disaster =

1967 football riot in Turkey

- Date: 17 September 1967; 58 years ago
- Time: 16:20 EET (14:20 UTC)
- Location: Atatürk Stadium Kayseri, Turkey; 38.723056°N 35.496667°E
- Type: Human crush
- Cause: Exit gates opening inward
- Deaths: 43
- Injuries: At least 300 injured

The Kayseri Atatürk Stadium disaster refers to an occurrence of football hooliganism, resulting in 43 deaths and at least 300 injuries (according to newspaper Hürriyet's headline 600), during the football match held on September 17, 1967 between the clubs of Kayserispor and Sivasspor at the Atatürk Stadium of Kayseri in Turkey. It was known as the worst sports-related violence to occur in Turkey.

== Matchday ==
The match was abandoned following the events that broke out after the goal scored by Kayserispor's Oktay Aktan in the 20th minute. After the goal tensions rose in the stands and on the pitch. Sivasspor player-coach Hilmi Kiremitçi was later banned for his misconduct by the Turkish Football Federation (TFF). Provocative conduct by a Kayserispor Amigo at half-time was not helpful either. Supporters of the two teams throwing rocks at each other, and fans fleeing the violence in panic caused a stampede in front of the stand exits. As the exit gates opened inward, many fans died because they were crushed and suffocated. The match was abandoned after the first half.

== Aftermath ==
The events in the stadium were then followed by vandalism in Kayseri and days of riots in Sivas. Inadequate security measures were amongst the reasons for the disaster. Prior to the game six Sivasspor fans were arrested. After the match eight Sivasspor and 18 Kayserispor spectators were arrested. Both the Governor of Sivas as the Governor of Kayseri as well as and the Chief of Police in Kayseri had to leave their job. In addition, the events that took place in the match between Kayseri Havagücü and Sivas 4 Eylül – two Kayseri Havagücü footballers breaking their legs and the Kayseri side leaving the field a week earlier – can be considered as a reason for the events that occurred in this match.

The TFF suspended the games in the White Group of the competition for a week. Consequently, both teams were deemed defeated and were sanctioned with a seventeen home games ban. The teams were separated in different groups until 1991. This match went down in football history as the 1967 Kayseri Atatürk Stadium disaster.
