= Burhan Eşer =

Turkish footballer

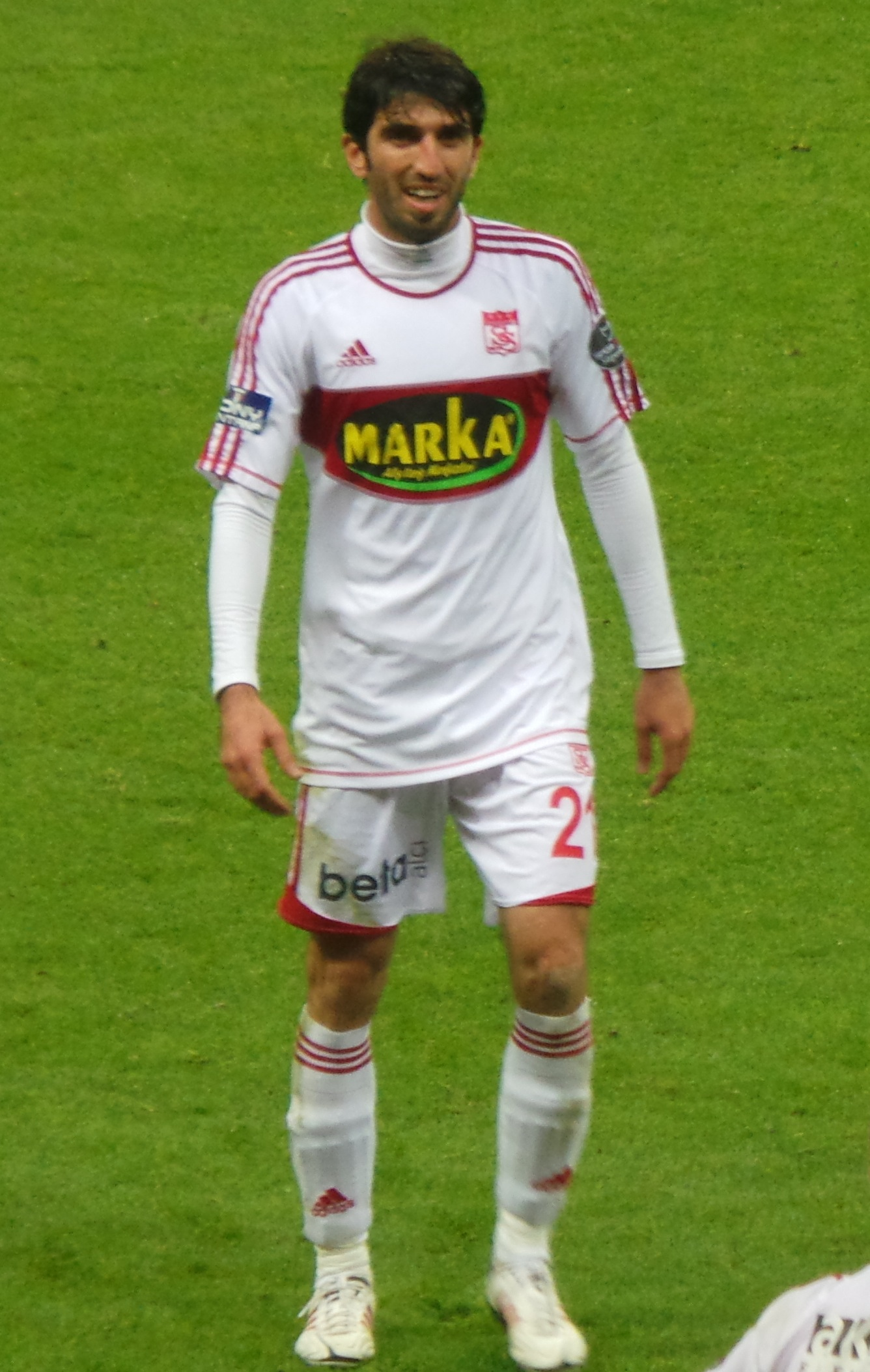
- Eşer playing for Sivasspor in 2013.

Personal information
- Date of birth: 1 January 1985 (age 41)
- Place of birth: Diyarbakır, Turkey
- Height: 1.80 m (5 ft 11 in)
- Position: Midfielder

Team information
- Current team: Bodrum (head coach)

Youth career
- 2000–2003: Yenişehir Belediye Kayaspor
- 2003–2004: Diyarbakırspor

Senior career*
Years	Team	Apps	(Gls)
2004–2005	Diyarbakırspor	34	(11)
2005	Gaziantep B.B.	5	(2)
2005–2006	Diyarbakırspor	25	(5)
2006–2010	Gençlerbirliği	98	(33)
2010–2013	Eskişehirspor	54	(11)
2013	→ Mersin İdmanyurdu (loan)	16	(4)
2013–2017	Sivasspor	121	(30)
2017–2018	BB Erzurumspor	36	(6)
2018–2019	Osmanlıspor	32	(7)
2019–2020	Akhisarspor	30	(10)
2020–2021	Hekimoğlu Trabzon	32	(19)
2021–2022	Bodrumspor	31	(6)
2022–2023	Isparta 32 Spor	17	(0)

International career
2005	Turkey U20	2	(2)
2006	Turkey U21	3	(3)
2008	Turkey A2	1	(0)

Managerial career
- 2023–2025: Bodrum (assistant)
- 2025–: Bodrum
- * Club domestic league appearances and goals

Burhan Eşer (born 1 January 1985) is a Turkish football coach and former player who played as a midfielder. He's currently serving as the head coach of Bodrum.
