= Jakub Navrátil =

Czech footballer (born 1984)

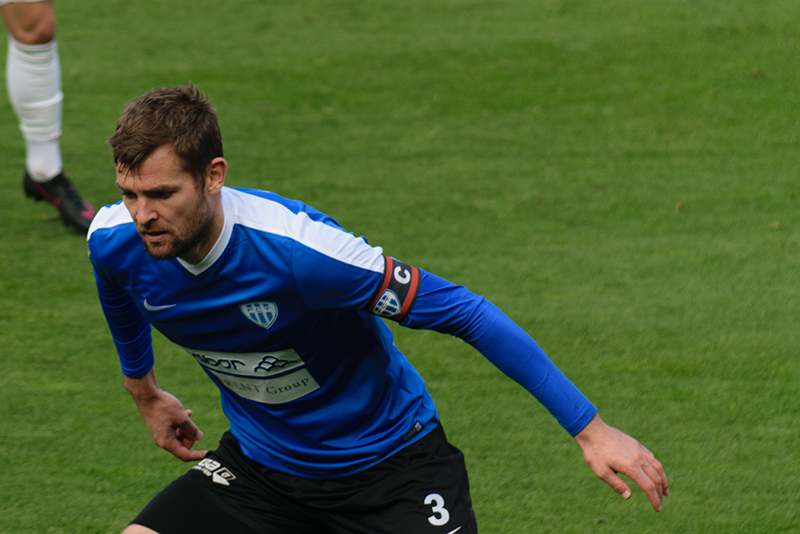

Personal information
- Date of birth: 1 February 1984 (age 42)
- Place of birth: Tábor, Czechoslovakia
- Height: 1.93 m (6 ft 4 in)
- Position: Defender

Youth career
- 1992–2002: Tábor

Senior career*
Years	Team	Apps	(Gls)
2002–2007	Marila Příbram	87	(3)
2008–2010	Viktoria Plzeň	59	(4)
2011–2014	Sivasspor	92	(7)
2014–2015	Mladá Boleslav	22	(2)
2015–2016	Táborsko	2	(0)
2016	Juve Stabia	4	(0)
2016–2023	Táborsko	170	(13)
- * Club domestic league appearances and goals

Jakub Navrátil (born 1 February 1984) is a retired Czech footballer who played as a central defender.

== Career ==
He signed for Sivasspor on a 3 1/2-year contract from FC Viktoria Plzeň in 2011.

He spent the largest part of his career in Táborsko.

== Honours ==
=== Club ===
FC Viktoria Plzeň

- Czech Cup: 2010
