= Sivas 4 September Stadium =

Football stadium in Sivas, Turkey

Coordinates: 39°44′27.70″N 37°00′11.90″E

- Sivas 4 Eylül Stadyumu
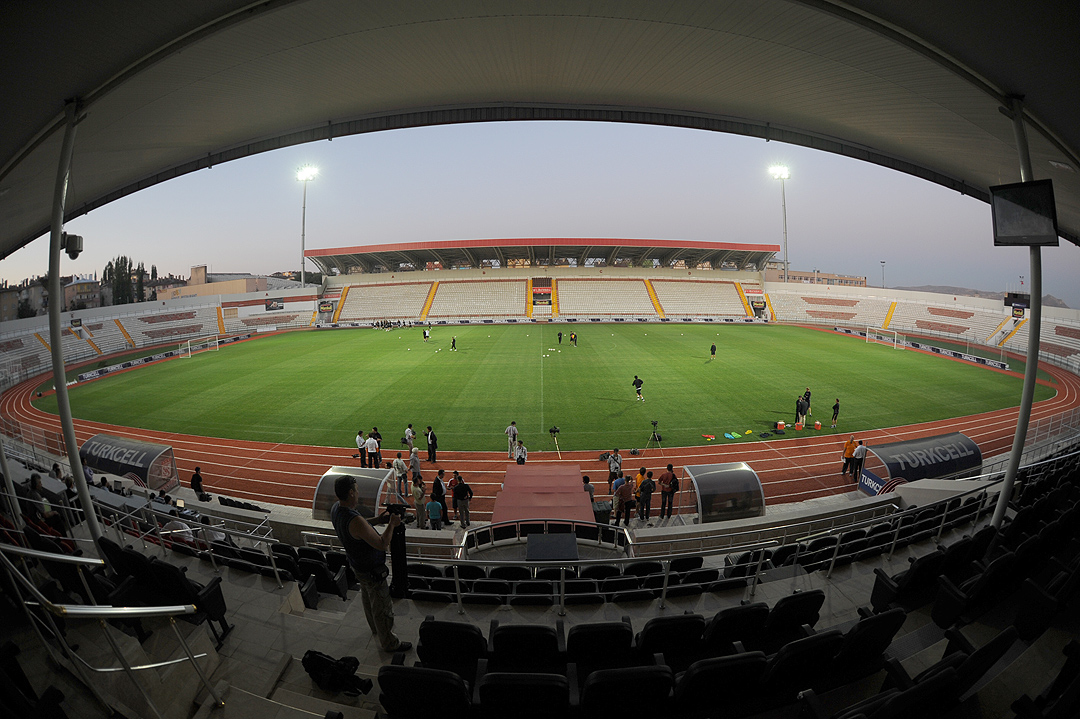
- Interactive map of Sivas 4 September Stadium
- Location: Sivas, Turkey
- Capacity: 14,998
- Surface: Grass
- Field size: 105 x 68 m

Construction
- Opened: 1984
- Renovated: 2005, 2009
- Demolished: 2017

Tenant
- Sivasspor (1984–2016)

Sivas 4 September Stadium (Turkish: Sivas 4 Eylül Stadyumu) was a multi-purpose stadium in Sivas, Turkey. It was used mostly for football matches and was the former home ground of Sivasspor. The stadium held 14,998 people.

In 2005 the stadium was renovated with extra 1,200 seats and was initially painted red and white.
