= VfB Aßlar =

- Full name: Verein für Bewegungsspiele 1924 Aßlar e.V.
- Founded: 1924
- Ground: Dill-Stadion
- Capacity: 8,000
- League: Kreisoberliga Gießen/Marburg West (VIII)
- 2022–23: 7th
Home colours	Away colours

VfB Aßlar is a German football club from the city of Aßlar, Hesse. The club was established on 25 April 1924 and in 1937 was joined by Turnverein 1908 Aßlar. In 1954 TV went its own way again as a separate side.

== History ==
In 1971, VfB advanced to the Amateurliga Hessen (III) after finishing second in the Landesliga Hessen-Mitte (IV). They played a single season in the Amateurliga and were relegated after a 16th-place finish. Over the next half dozen seasons Aßlar earned mid-table results in Landesliga play before being demoted in 1978. The team had two more turns in the Landesliga in 1980–81 and 1984–1988 before descending into lower-tier competition.

Since the voluntary relegation from the Verbandsliga Mitte in the 08/09 season, VfB have played in the Kreisoberliga Gießen/Marburg West (VIII). The 22/23 season ended there in 7th place.
