= Ümit Kurt (footballer) =

Turkish footballer

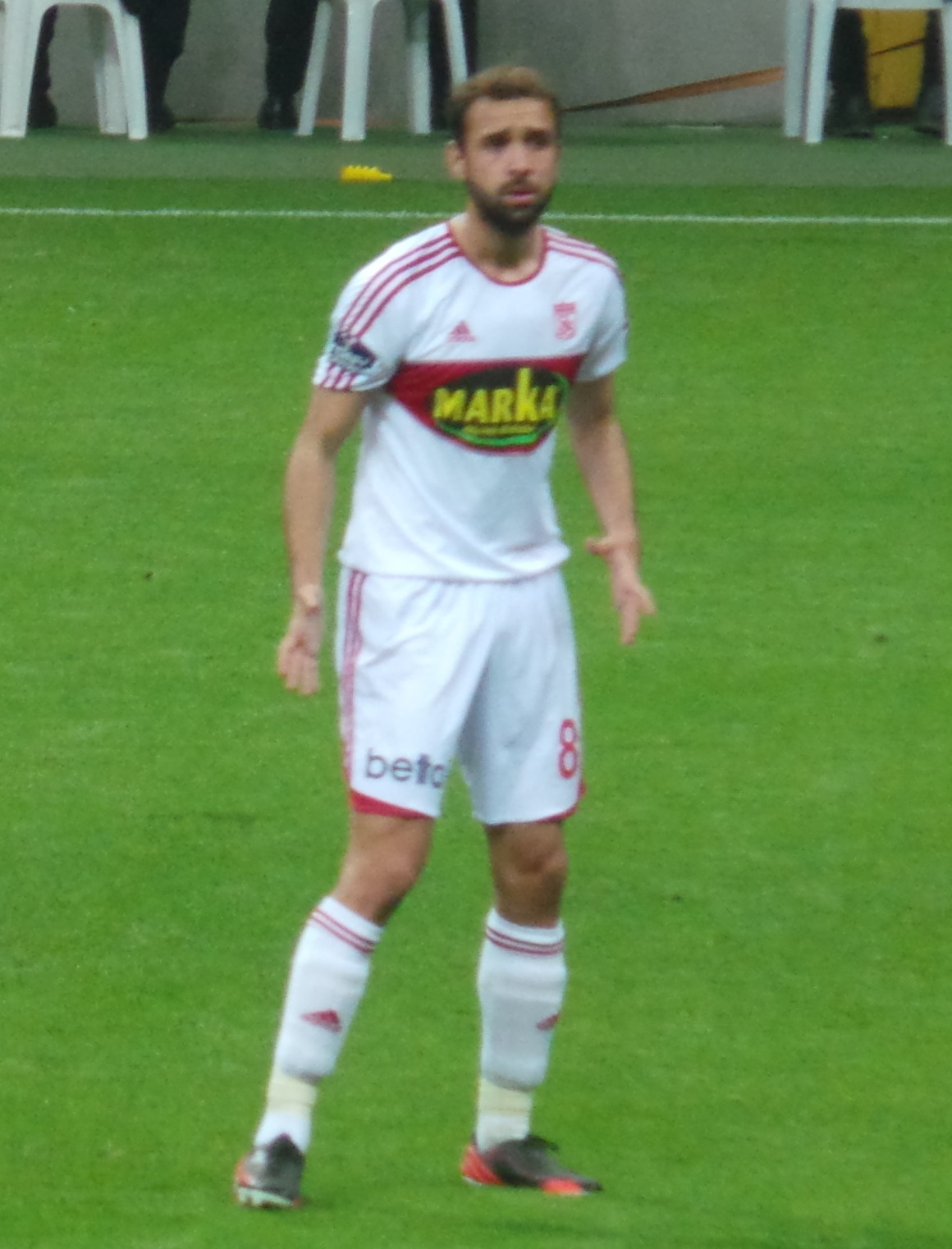

Personal information
- Date of birth: 2 May 1991 (age 35)
- Place of birth: Osmaniye, Turkey
- Height: 1.84 m (6 ft 0 in)
- Position: Centre back

Team information
- Current team: 24 Erzincanspor
- Number: 80

Youth career
- 2003–2008: Osmaniye Akdenizspor
- 2008–2010: Ankaragücü

Senior career*
Years	Team	Apps	(Gls)
2010–2013	Ankaragücü	35	(2)
2013–2016	Sivasspor	77	(1)
2016–2018	Çaykur Rizespor	40	(1)
2018–2019	Boluspor	41	(5)
2020–2021	Manisa	29	(2)
2021–2023	Sakaryaspor	58	(3)
2023–2024	1461 Trabzon FK	9	(0)
2024	Şanlıurfaspor	7	(0)
2024–	24 Erzincanspor	8	(0)

International career
2015–	Turkey	1	(0)
- * Club domestic league appearances and goals as of 3 November 2024

Ümit Kurt (born 2 May 1991) is a Turkish footballer who plays as a centre back for 24 Erzincanspor.

== Club career ==
=== MKE Ankaragücü ===
He made his Süper Lig debut on 24 April 2011 for MKE Ankaragücü. Ümit Kurt played 35 matches with MKE Ankaragücü and managed to score two goals playing as a center back defender.

=== Sivasspor ===
On 3 January 2013, Kurt was transferred to Sivasspor for €140,000. Kurt scored his first goal on 25 August 2013, against Konyaspor. He received a cross from Cicinho in the 67th minute from a right corner and scored with a flying header.
