= Abdurrahman Dereli =

Turkish professional footballer

Personal information
- Full name: Abdurrahman Dereli
- Date of birth: February 15, 1981 (age 45)
- Place of birth: Trabzon, Turkey
- Height: 1.73 m (5 ft 8 in)
- Position: Right back

Senior career*
Years	Team	Apps	(Gls)
1998–2005	Akçaabat Sebatspor	194	(13)
2005–2007	MKE Ankaragücü	58	(4)
2007–2011	Sivasspor	81	(2)
2011–2012	Orduspor	20	(0)
2012–2013	Kasımpaşa	28	(0)
2013–2015	Sivasspor	4	(0)
2015–2016	Balıkesirspor	11	(0)

International career
2000	Turkey U19	1	(0)
- * Club domestic league appearances and goals as of 5 January 2016

Abdurrahman Dereli (born 15 February 1981) is a Turkish professional footballer. He last played as a right back for Balıkesirspor in the Süper Lig.
