= Sivasspor =

Turkish football club

- Full name: Sivasspor Kulübü
- Nickname: Yiğidolar (The Braves)
- Founded: 9 May 1967; 59 years ago
- Ground: Sivas 4 Eylül Stadium
- Capacity: 27,532
- Coordinates: 39°43′42″N 36°59′02″E
- President: Bahattin Eken
- Head coach: Çağdaş Çavuş
- League: TFF 1. Lig
- 2025–26: TFF 1. Lig, 10th of 20
- Website: www.sivasspor.org.tr
Home colours	Away colours	Third colours

Sivasspor Kulübü, known as Kiğılı Sivasspor for sponsorship reasons, is a Turkish professional sports club based in Sivas. The club's primary department is men's football, which currently competes in the 1. Lig, the second tier of the Turkish football league system, following their relegation from the Süper Lig at the end of the 2024–25 season.

The club was founded on 9 May 1967 through the merger of three local amateur clubs—Sivas Gençlik, Yolspor, and Kızılırmak—to meet the professional league requirements of the time. Sivasspor plays its home matches at the New Sivas 4 Eylül Stadium, which opened in 2016 and has a capacity of 27,532 spectators. The team's traditional kit colors are red and white, representing the Turkish flag and the club's national identity.

Sivasspor experienced its most successful era in the Süper Lig during the late 2000s and early 2020s. They competed for the league title in two consecutive seasons, finishing fourth in 2007–08 and finishing as runners-up in 2008–09, their highest-ever league placement. The club is notable for being one of only three non-champion clubs (along with Altay and Kocaelispor) to have topped the Süper Lig standings at the halfway point of the season, a feat they achieved in 2007–08, 2008–09, and 2019–20.

In domestic cup competitions, Sivasspor won their first major trophy by defeating Kayserispor 3–2 in the final of the 2021–22 Turkish Cup. This victory qualified them for European competition, where they reached the Round of 16 in the 2022–23 UEFA Europa Conference League, eventually losing to Fiorentina. The club shares a fierce regional rivalry with Kayserispor, known as the "Central Anatolian Derby".

== History ==
=== Foundation and early years (1932–1967) ===
The club's roots trace back to 14 May 1932, when it was originally established as Sivas Gençlik in Sivas. Wearing red and white kits, the team competed at the amateur level for several decades. By the mid-1960s, the city sought representation in the newly forming professional leagues of Turkey. To meet the requirements for professional status, Sivas Gençlik merged with two other local clubs, Yolspor and Kızılırmak. The merger was officially formalized on 9 May 1967, establishing Sivasspor as a professional entity. The club was admitted to the TFF Second League (now TFF 1. Lig) for the 1967–68 season.

=== The 1967 Kayseri Stadium disaster ===
Sivasspor's debut professional season was marred by the Kayseri Atatürk Stadium disaster, one of the worst sporting tragedies in Turkish history. On 17 September 1967, during a match against neighboring rivals Kayserispor (then known as Kayseri Erciyesspor) at the Kayseri Atatürk Stadium, tensions between supporters escalated into violence and a subsequent stampede. The disaster resulted in 43 deaths and over 300 injuries, with the majority of casualties being Sivasspor fans. Following the tragedy, the Turkish Football Federation suspended both teams and mandated that they be placed in separate groups of the league to prevent further violence, a separation that lasted until the 1990–91 season.

=== Rise to the Süper Lig and title challenges (2005–2010) ===
After decades in the lower divisions, Sivasspor achieved promotion to the Süper Lig for the first time in 2005 after winning the Second League title. Under the management of Bülent Uygun, the club enjoyed a "golden era" between 2007 and 2009. In the 2007–08 season, they finished fourth, earning equal points with the second and third-placed teams but missing out on UEFA Champions League qualification due to goal difference.

The following season, 2008–09, Sivasspor mounted a serious title challenge, leading the league for much of the campaign. They ultimately finished as runners-up, second only to Beşiktaş, which qualified them for the UEFA Champions League for the first time in club history.

=== European campaigns and first major trophy (2020–Present) ===
Sivasspor remained a competitive force in the top flight, consistently qualifying for European competitions. In the 2020–21 season, they competed in the GSs of the UEFA Europa League.

The club achieved its most significant success to date on 26 May 2022, winning the 2021–22 Turkish Cup. In the final played at the Atatürk Olympic Stadium, Sivasspor defeated their historical rivals Kayserispor 3–2 after extra time. Goals from Aaron Appindangoyé, Max Gradel, and Moussa Konaté secured the club's first-ever major trophy. This victory qualified them for the UEFA Europa Conference League, where they reached the R16 in the 2022–23 season.

In the 2023–24 season, the team finished 7th in the Süper Lig under the returning manager Bülent Uygun. In the 2024–25 season, Sivasspor was relegated to the TFF 1. Lig after finishing 17th in the Süper Lig, ending an eight-year stint in the top flight. The campaign was marked by significant managerial instability and financial difficulties, including a three-window transfer ban imposed by FIFA in February 2025 due to unpaid debts.

The team began the season under returning manager Bülent Uygun, who was dismissed on 14 December 2024 following a string of poor results. He was replaced by Ömer Erdoğan, but his tenure lasted only until 5 March 2025, with the club winning just one of his nine league matches in charge. Former long-serving coach Rıza Çalımbay returned for a third spell to attempt a late rescue but was unable to reverse the team's fortunes. Relegation was effectively confirmed following a 1–0 away loss to Samsunspor on 18 May 2025, leaving the club unable to bridge the gap to safety with two matches remaining. Sivasspor concluded the season with 35 points from 36 matches, recording 9 wins, 8 draws, and 19 losses.

== Stadium ==
Sivasspor plays its home matches at the New Sivas 4 Eylül Stadium, located in Sivas, Turkey. The stadium officially opened in 2016, replacing the club's previous home, the original Sivas 4 Eylül Stadium. As of February 2026, the venue is known as the BG Grup 4 Eylül Stadium for sponsorship reasons, following an agreement with the construction and energy company BG Grup.

The stadium has a seating capacity of 27,734 spectators. It is noted for its "ecological" design features, which include solar panels for energy generation, rainwater harvesting systems, and a double-skin facade designed to provide insulation against the harsh winter climate of the region. In late 2023, the stadium underwent a significant lighting upgrade to facilitate night matches and visual shows. Following Sivasspor's relegation from the Süper Lig at the end of the 2024–25 season, the stadium currently hosts the team's TFF 1. Lig fixtures.

== Supporters ==
Sivasspor supporters are collectively known as Yiğidolar (The Braves), a reference to the club's nickname. The fan base is primarily concentrated in Sivas and among the Sivas diaspora across Turkey and Europe.

=== Supporter Groups ===
Historically, the tribunes were organized into several distinct groups, most notably Çılgınlar 58, Yiğido Gençlik, and Ellisekiz. In July 2024, these groups announced a merger under the name Kırmızı Duvar (Red Wall) to unify support for the 2024–25 season. However, following the club's relegation from the Süper Lig at the end of that season, the tribune structure underwent further reorganization.

For the 2025–26 TFF 1. Lig season, the active supporter groups are identified as Legend and Ellisekiz. These groups have been vocal in their criticism of local city officials for an alleged lack of support following the team's relegation. In December 2025, Legend and Ellisekiz issued a joint statement declaring that the club had been "abandoned" by the city's dynamics and called for unity to achieve promotion. In January 2026, the groups organized a major choreography in the Marathon Tribune to boost morale during the league campaign.

=== Rivalries ===
The supporters share a fierce rivalry with Kayserispor, a club from the neighboring city of Kayseri. Matches between the two are known as the "Central Anatolian Derby" (İç Anadolu Derbisi). The rivalry is deeply rooted in the 1967 Kayseri Atatürk Stadium disaster, a tragedy that occurred during a match between the two sides on 17 September 1967. The event resulted in 43 deaths and hundreds of injuries, predominantly among Sivasspor fans, after tensions in the stands led to a stampede.

== Crest and colors ==
Sivasspor's primary colors are red and white, which were chosen to represent the Turkish flag and the club's national identity. The club's crest features a shield design containing the team's name, the founding year (1967), and three stars positioned at the top. Unlike the championship stars awarded in the Süper Lig, the three stars on the Sivasspor badge symbolize the three local amateur clubs—Yolspor, Kızılırmak, and Sivas Gençlik—that merged to form the professional entity of Sivasspor in 1967.

For the 2025–26 season, the club's kits are manufactured by the Danish sportswear brand Hummel, following a two-year sponsorship agreement signed in May 2024 that covers both the 2024–25 and 2025–26 campaigns. The home kit typically features the traditional red and white striped design.

== Honours ==
=== National competitions ===
- Süper Lig
  - Runners-up (1): 2008–09
- TFF 1. Lig
  - Winners (2): 2004–05, 2016–17
- TFF Third League
  - Winners (1): 1998–99 (Group 2)
  - Runners-up (2): 1988–89 (Group 4), 1992–93 (Group 6)
- Turkish Cup
  - Winners (1): 2021–22
- Turkish Super Cup
  - Runners-up: 2022

== Past seasons ==
=== Results of League and Cup Competitions by Season ===
Season	League table									Turkish Cup	UEFA			Top scorer	
Season	League	Pos	P	W	D	L	GF	GA	Pts	Turkish Cup	UCL	UEL	UCL (Note: Includes UEFA Intertoto Cup)	Player	Goals
1967–2005	Competed in TFF 1. Lig, TFF 2. Lig, and Amateur Leagues														
2005–06	Süper Lig	8th	34	10	13	11	34	44	43	GS	—	—	—	Mehmet Yıldız	16
2006–07	Süper Lig	7th	34	14	6	14	41	44	48	GS	—	—	—	Pini Balili	9
2007–08	Süper Lig	4th	34	23	4	7	57	29	73	GS	—	—	—	Mehmet Yıldız	14
2008–09	Süper Lig	2nd	34	19	9	6	54	28	66	SF	—	—	RU	Mehmet Yıldız	14
2009–10	Süper Lig	15th	34	8	10	16	42	59	34	GS	3QR	PO	—	Yannick Kamanan	7
2010–11	Süper Lig	15th	34	8	11	15	43	57	35	GS	—	—	—	Ricardo Pedriel	7
2011–12	Süper Lig	7th	34	13	11	10	57	54	50	QF	—	—	—	Michael Eneramo	11
2012–13	Süper Lig	12th	34	12	8	14	42	46	44	SF	—	—	—	Michael Eneramo	11
2013–14	Süper Lig	5th	34	16	5	13	60	55	53	SF	—	—	—	Aatif Chahechouhe	17
2014–15	Süper Lig	13th	34	9	9	16	43	50	36	SF	—	—	—	Aatif Chahechouhe	13
2015–16	Süper Lig	16th↓	34	6	13	15	34	48	31	GS	—	—	—	Aatif Chahechouhe	12
2016–17	1. Lig	1st↑	34	17	11	6	51	27	62	QF	—	—	—	Leandrinho	14
2017–18	Süper Lig	7th	34	14	7	13	45	53	49	R16	—	—	—	Arouna Koné	13
2018–19	Süper Lig	12th	34	10	11	13	49	54	41	R32	—	—	—	Emre Kılınç	7
2019–20	Süper Lig	4th	34	17	9	8	55	38	60	QF	—	—	—	Mustapha Yatabaré	13
2020–21	Süper Lig	5th	40	16	17	7	54	43	65	QF	—	GS	—	Max Gradel	11
2021–22	Süper Lig	10th	38	14	12	12	52	50	54	W	—	—	PO	Mustapha Yatabaré	10
2022–23	Süper Lig	14th	36	11	8	17	46	54	41	SF	PO	—	R16	Max Gradel	7
2023–24	Süper Lig	7th	38	14	12	12	47	54	54	R16	—	—	—	Rey Manaj	18
2024–25	Süper Lig	17th↓	36	9	8	19	44	60	35	GS	—	—	—	Rey Manaj	11
2025–26	1. Lig	14th	24	7	9	8	27	24	30	—	—	—	—	TBD	—

=== League participations ===
- Süper Lig: 2005–16, 2017–2025,
- TFF 1. Lig: 1967–83, 1984–86, 1999–05, 2016–17, 2025–
- TFF 2. Lig: 1986–99
- Super Amateur Leagues: 1983–84

== Sivasspor in Europe ==
Sivasspor has participated in UEFA competitions on several occasions, making their European debut in the 2008 UEFA Intertoto Cup. The club's most successful continental campaign to date occurred during the 2022–23 UEFA Europa Conference League. After being eliminated in the Europa League play-off round by Malmö FF, Sivasspor dropped into the Conference League GS.

In the GS, the team finished first in Group G, ahead of CFR Cluj, Slavia Prague, and Ballkani, securing a direct spot in the R16. They were drawn against Italian club Fiorentina; after losing the first leg 0–1 in Florence, Sivasspor lost the second leg 1–4 at home, resulting in a 1–5 aggregate elimination. As of February 2026, this remains Sivasspor's last appearance in a major European competition, as the club did not qualify for the 2023–24, 2024–25, or 2025–26 editions.

=== Summary ===
As of 10 March 2023

Competition	Pld	W	D	L	GF	GA	GD
UEFA Champions League	2	1	0	1	3	6	–3
UEFA Europa League	10	2	0	8	10	21	–11
UEFA Europa Conference League	14	6	3	5	18	21	–3
UEFA Intertoto Cup	4	1	1	2	3	7	–4
Total	30	10	4	16	34	55	–21

=== European participation ===
Season	Competition	Round	Club	Home	Away	Aggregate
2008	UEFA Intertoto Cup	2R	(Montenegro) Grbalj	1–0	2–2	3–2
2008	UEFA Intertoto Cup	3R	(Portugal) Braga	0–2	0–3	0–5
2009–10	UEFA Champions League	3Q	(Belgium) Anderlecht	3–1	0–5	3–6
2009–10	UEFA Europa League	PO	(Ukraine) Shakhtar Donetsk	0–3	0–2	0–5
2020–21	UEFA Europa League	GS	(Spain) Villarreal	0–1	3–5	3rd
2020–21	UEFA Europa League	GS	(Israel) Maccabi Tel Aviv	1–2	0–1	3rd
2020–21	UEFA Europa League	GS	(Azerbaijan) Qarabağ	2–0	3–2	3rd
2021–22	UEFA Europa Conference League	2Q	(Moldova) Petrocub Hîncești	1–0	1–0	2–0
2021–22	UEFA Europa Conference League	3Q	(Georgia (country)) Dinamo Batumi	1–1 (a.e.t.)	2–1	3–2
2021–22	UEFA Europa Conference League	PO	(Denmark) Copenhagen	1–2	0–5	1–7
2022–23	UEFA Europa League	PO	(Sweden) Malmö	0–2	1–3	1–5
2022–23	UEFA Europa Conference League	GS	(Romania) CFR Cluj	3–0	1–0	1st
2022–23	UEFA Europa Conference League	GS	(Czech Republic) Slavia Prague	1–1	1–1	1st
2022–23	UEFA Europa Conference League	GS	(Kosovo) Ballkani	3–4	2–1	1st
2022–23	UEFA Europa Conference League	R16	(Italy) Fiorentina	1–4	0–1	1–5

UEFA Ranking history:

As of 21 June 2023

Season	Rank	Points	Ref.
2010	169 ▲	8.390	
2011	172 ▼	8.510	
2012	170 ▲	8.310	
2013	168 ▲	8.400	
2014	190 ▼	8.340	
2021	182 ▲	6.020	
2022	188 ▼	6.500	
2023	98 ▲	16.500	
2024			

== Players ==
=== Current squad ===
As of 15 November 2026

Note: Flags indicate national team as defined under FIFA eligibility rules; some limited exceptions apply. Players may hold more than one non-FIFA nationality.

No.	Pos.	Nation	Player
1	GK	TUR	Göktuğ Bakırbaş
2	DF	GAB	Aaron Appindangoyé
4	DF	AZE	Mert Çelik
6	MF	TUR	Kamil Fidan
7	DF	TUR	Murat Paluli
8	MF	GRE	Charis Charisis
9	FW	ALB	Rey Manaj
11	FW	TUR	Burak Kapacak
16	GK	TUR	Arda Erdursun
17	FW	GHA	Clinton Duodu (on loan from Apollon Limassol)
19	MF	TUR	Emre Gökay
20	MF	GHA	Musah Mohammed
22	DF	TUR	Okan Erdoğan
23	MF	TUR	Cihat Çelik
25	DF	TUR	Süleyman Özdamar
26	DF	TUR	Feyzi Yıldırım

No.	Pos.	Nation	Player
27	MF	MKD	Valon Ethemi
28	FW	TUR	Salih Kavrazlı (on loan from Bursaspor)
30	FW	GAM	Ebrima Ceesay (on loan from Samsunspor)
34	DF	TUR	Turan Tuzlacık
35	GK	TUR	Ali Şaşal Vural
43	MF	TUR	Eymen Yurdcu
53	MF	TUR	Yiğit Baynazoğlu
58	DF	TUR	Uğur Çiftçi (captain)
60	MF	TUR	Kerem Atakan Kesgin
66	MF	TUR	Oğuzhan Aksoy
77	DF	TUR	Yusuf Kefkir
89	FW	BRA	Amilton
90	DF	TUR	Mehmet Albayrak
92	MF	TUR	Savaş Ala
99	FW	TUR	Yılmaz Cin
—	MF	TUR	Sinan Kaya

== Non-playing staff ==
=== Executive ===
Position	Name
Chairman	(Turkey) Bahattin Eken
Vice Chairman	(Turkey) Burak Özçoban
Vice President	(Turkey) Mustafa Kurbanoğlu
Sports and Sponsorships	(Turkey) Mehmet Akif Bağçe
Football and Infrastructure	(Turkey) Yusuf Bozatlı
Public Institutions Relations	(Turkey) Nurettin Yıldırım
Marketing and Licensing	(Turkey) İbrahim Emre Mermer
Sponsorship	(Turkey) Deniz Kızılırmak
Stadium and Fans	(Turkey) Arif Kaleli
TFF Relations	(Turkey) Ömer Yaman
Facilities	(Turkey) Faruk Taşseten
Legal Affairs	(Turkey) Erhan Ekici
External Relations	(Turkey) İsmail Yıldız
Sponsorship and Advertising	(Turkey) Kürşad Ceylan
Vice President	(Turkey) Mücahit Yıldız

=== Coaching ===
Position	Name
Head Coach	(Turkey) İsmet Taşdemir
Assistant Coach	(Turkey) Mehmet Yozgatlı
Assistant Coach	(Turkey) Yiğit Can Taşkın
Assistant Coach	(Turkey) Ömer Fırat Çelik
Fitness Coach	(Turkey) Mehmet Kale
Goalkeeping Coach	(Turkey) Murat Gönen
Analyst	(Turkey) Evren Otyakmaz
Analyst	(Turkey) Mehmet Coşkun Özdemir
Sporting Director	(Turkey) Abdurrahman Dereli
Doctor	(Turkey) Ahmet Edremit
Media Officer	(Turkey) Erhan Erdoğan
Translator	(Turkey) Taylan Okan İşçi
Translator	(Turkey) Burak Kütükkıran
Physiotherapist	(Turkey) Fatih Aydın
Physiotherapist	(Turkey) Sefa Karayılan
Masseur	(Turkey) Tincer Karakaya
Masseur	(Turkey) Selahattin Aktaş
Masseur	(Turkey) Emre Battal
Equipment Manager	(Turkey) Murat Vurgun
Equipment Manager	(Turkey) Emre Koç
Photographer	(Turkey) Hüseyin Can Karaçalı

== Coaching history ==
Years	Name
1967–1968	(Turkey) Hikmet Kiremitçi
1968–1969	(Turkey) İlhan Uralgil
1968–1969	(Turkey) Lütfü Baykuş
1969–1971	(Turkey) Naci Özkaya
1970–1971	(Turkey) Lefter Küçükandonyadis
1971–1972	(Turkey) Lütfü Baykuş
1972–1973	(Turkey) Bülent Eken
1973–1974	(Turkey) İlhan Uralgil
1973–1974	(Turkey) Hilmi Kiremitçi
1974–1975	(Turkey) Serpil Hamdi Tüzün
1974–1975	(Turkey) Erdoğan Gürhan
1975–1976	(Turkey) Lütfü Baykuş
1975–1976	(Turkey) İsmet Yamanoğlu
1975–1976	(Turkey) Muhterem Ar
1976–1977	(Turkey) İsmail Kurt
1976–1978	(Turkey) Selahattin Elbay
1977–1978	(Turkey) Lütfü Baykuş
1977–1978	(Turkey) Mustafa Arslan
1977–1978	(Turkey) Fevzi Tanyıldız
1978–1979	(Turkey) Köksal Mesci
1979–1980	(Turkey) Nazım Kona
1980–1981	(Turkey) Kamuran Soykıray
1980–1982	(Turkey) Erdoğan Gürhan
1981–1982	(Turkey) Selahattin Elbay
1982–1984	(Turkey) Uğur Yıldırım
1984–1985	(Turkey) Selahattin Elbay
1984–1985	(Turkey) Mümtaz Sümer
1984–1985	(Turkey) Yılmaz Şen
1985–1986	(Turkey) Metin Kurt
1985–1986	(Turkey) Kadir Giderler
1986–1987	(Turkey) Lütfü Baykuş
1986–1987	(Turkey) Selahattin Elbay
1986–1987	(Turkey) Ömer Uzun
1987–1990	(Turkey) Erdoğan Gürhan
1988–1989	(Turkey) Timuçin Çuğ
1989–1990	(Turkey) Oğuz Emiroğlu
1990–1991	(Turkey) İsa Ertürk
1990–1991	(Turkey) İlker Tolon
1990–1991	(Turkey) Halis Reçber
1991–1992	(Turkey) Murat Özgen
1992–1993	(Turkey) Arda Vural
1993–1994	(Turkey) Arda Vural
1992–1993	(Turkey) Nihat Fırat
1993–1994	(Turkey) Üstün Türköz
1993–1994	(Turkey) Davut Şahin
1993–1994	(Turkey) Fikret Çeliktaş
1994–1995	(Turkey) Turgut Kafkas
1994–1995	(Turkey) Hasan Gül
1995–1996	(Turkey) Göker Ekren
1996–1997	(Turkey) Timuçin Çuğ
1996–1997	(Turkey) Erhan Dodanlı
1997–1999	(Turkey) Murat Özgen
1997–1998	(Turkey) Hikmet Sevim
1997–1998	(Turkey) Faruk Serin
1999–2000	(Turkey) Bülent Albayrak
2000–2001	(Turkey) Ahmet Ertem
2000–2001	(Turkey) Yaşar Elmas
2001–2002	(Turkey) Bülent Albayrak
2001–2002	(Turkey) İlyas Tüfekçi
2002–2003	(Turkey) Mehmet Şahan
2003–2004	(Turkey) Muharrem Uğur
2003–2004	(Turkey) Kemal Kılıç
2004–2005	(Turkey) İsmail Kartal
2005–2006	(Germany) Werner Lorant
2006–2007	(Slovakia) Karol Pecze
2006–2009	(Turkey) Bülent Uygun
2009–2010	(Turkey) Muhsin Ertuğral
2010–2011	(Turkey) Mesut Bakkal
2011–2013	(Turkey) Rıza Çalımbay
2013–2014	(Brazil) Roberto Carlos
2014–2015	(Turkey) Sergen Yalçın
2015–2016	(Turkey) Okan Buruk
2015–2016	(Turkey) Mesut Bakkal
2016–2017	(Turkey) Osman Özköylü
2016–2017	(Turkey) Mesut Bakkal
2017–2018	(Turkey) Samet Aybaba
2018–2019	(Turkey) Tamer Tuna
2018–2019	(Turkey) Hakan Keleş
2019–2023	(Turkey) Rıza Çalımbay
2023	(Turkey) Servet Çetin
2023–2024	(Turkey) Bülent Uygun
2024–2025	(Turkey) Ömer Erdoğan
2025	(Turkey) Rıza Çalımbay
2025	(Turkey) Osman Zeki Korkmaz
2025–2026	(Turkey) Mehmet Altıparmak
2026–	(Turkey) İsmet Taşdemir

== Presidential history ==
Years	Name
1967–1968	(Turkey) Ahmet Durakoğlu
1968–1969	(Turkey) Adil Onmuş
1969–1970	(Turkey) Ethem Uslu
1970–1974	(Turkey) Sacit Gökseyiğitoğlu
1970–1974	(Turkey) İhsan Buyruk
1974–1975	(Turkey) Nusret Akça
1974–1977	(Turkey) Hüseyin Yıldırım
1977–1978	(Turkey) Nusret Akça
1981–1982	(Turkey) Suzi Tirkeş
1982–1983	(Turkey) Selahattin Koçer
1983–1985	(Turkey) Metin Kazanç
1981–1982	(Turkey) Samet Sayıcı
1980–1981	(Turkey) Erdoğan Yüce
1985–1986	(Turkey) Nusret Akça
1985–1986	(Turkey) Günkut Bulut
1986–1987	(Turkey) Yahya Küçükkılıç
1988–1989	(Turkey) Özer Süt
1990–1991	(Turkey) Metin Kazanç
1991–1992	(Turkey) Yakup Gülmez
1993–1994	(Turkey) İsmail Haksever
1994–1996	(Turkey) Mehmet Kaya
1996–2004	(Turkey) Osman Seçilmiş
2004–2024	(Turkey) Mecnun Otyakmaz
2024–	(Turkey) Bahattin Eken

== Sponsorships ==
=== Kit sponsorships ===
Season	Supplier	Shirt sponsor	Backside sponsor
2005–06	Diadora	Turkcell	—
2006–07	Diadora	Turkcell	—
2007–08	Diadora	Turkcell	—
2008–09	Adidas	Turkcell	—
2009–10	Adidas	Turkcell	Duyes Group
2010–11	Adidas	Türk Kızılayı	Aksa
2011–12	Adidas	Spor Toto	—
2012–13	Adidas	Spor Toto	Marka AVM
2013–14	Adidas	Riga Boya	Marka AVM
2014–15	Adidas	Marka AVM	Aksa
2015–16	Adidas	Marka AVM	Metropol AVM
2016–17	Adidas	Marka AVM	Spor Toto
2017–18	Adidas	Demir İnşaat	Demir Enerji
2018–19	Adidas	Demir İnşaat	Demir Enerji
2019–20	Adidas	Demir İnşaat	Winasol
2020–21	Puma	Demir İnşaat	Demir Holding
2021–22	Puma	Demir İnşaat	Aksa
2022–23	Tony Montana	Bitexen	Aksa
2023–24	Tony Montana	Brand Vadi Istanbul	Aksa
2024–present	Hummel	Brand Vadi Istanbul	Aksa

=== Naming sponsorships ===
Term	Sponsor	Ref.
2014–2016	Medicana Sivasspor	
2017–2020	Demir Grup Sivasspor	
2021–2023	Demir Grup Sivasspor	
2023–2025	EMS Yapı Sivasspor	
2025–	Özbelsan Sivasspor	

== Other departments ==
Sivasspor has got active departments in women's football (founded in 2021), billiards, bridge, judo, table tennis, swimming and Jereed, an ancient Turkic equestrian team sport.
