= 2011–12 Mersin İdmanyurdu season =

Mersin İdmanyurdu
2011–12 season
- President: (Turkey) Ali Kahramanlı
- Head coach: (Turkey) Nurullah Sağlam
- Stadium: Tevfik Sırrı Gür Stadium; Mersin, Turkey (Capacity: 10,128)
- Süper Lig: 13th
- Turkish Cup: 3rd Elimination Round
- Most appearances: (Brazil) André Moritz (33)
- Top goalscorer: League: (Brazil) Márcio Nobre (10); All: (Brazil) Márcio Nobre (10)
- Highest home attendance: 10.128 vs Galatasaray (Süper Lig, R 27)
- Lowest home attendance: 2.532 vs Ankaragücü (Süper Lig, R 18)
- Average home league attendance: 5.064
Home colours	Away colours	Third colours

Mersin İdmanyurdu (also Mersin İdman Yurdu, Mersin İY, or MİY) Sports Club; located in Mersin, east Mediterranean coast of Turkey in 2011–2012. 2011–12 season was the 12th season of Mersin İdmanyurdu football team in Süper Lig, the top level division in Turkey. Mersin İdmanyurdu football team has finished 2010–11 season at 1st place in TFF First League. The team has promoted to 2011–12 Süper Lig. The aim of team was remaining in the league for the first year after promotion. MİY finished season at 13th place and remained in the league. Team participated in 2011–12 Turkish Cup and was eliminated at Round 3.

Ali Kahramanlı was club president. Nurullah Sağlam who won the 2010–11 TFF First League championship has continued as head coach. 11 of the players were saved in the team and some known players from Beşiktaş, Bursaspor and Sivasspor were transferred in pre-season. Attacking midfielder André Moritz was the most appeared player with 33 apps. Márcio Nobre who known as Mert Nobre in Turkey was the top goalscorer with ten goals.

== Pre-season ==
MİY team started to first preparation camp period in Isparta, Davraz on 27 June 2011. Preparation games:

- 04.07.2011 - MİY-Metalurg (UKR): 1–1. Monday, 17:00. Isparta, Davraz. Goal: Andre Moritz.
- 06.07.2011 - MİY-Inter Baku (AZE): 3–3. Wednesday. Isparta, Davraz, Sirena Hotel. Goals: Kamanan 55', Erman Özgür 90' and Moritz 65'.
- 12.07.2011 - MİY-Terek (RUS): 1–1. Tuesday. Isparta, Davraz, Sirena Hotel. Goal: Moritz.

First camp period ended on 12 July 2011. Second camp period started in Austria, on 17 July 2011. Planned preparation games could not be played during Austria camp due to several reasons. One preparation game was played:

- 19.07.2011 - MİY-Górnik Zabrze (POL): 1-1 . Tuesday, 18:00. Dilly Hotel, Windischgarsten, Austria. Goal: Erhan Güven 44'.

Second camp period ended on 30 July 2011. A third camp period is being planned because a delay in the 2011–12 Süper Lig is in the concern due to manipulation matters which TFF deals with. Preceding to the third camp, MİY attended in a tournament in Ankara, which Ankaragücü club organized and the revenue obtained from the audience was donated to people suffering from famine in Somalia. The games played in this tournament were:

- 11.08.2011 - Gençlerbirliği-MİY: 1–3. Thursday, 19:00. Saray Spor Tesisleri, Ankara. Goals: Nduka 1', Kamanan 17', 32'.
- 12.08.2011 - Sivasspor-MİY: 2-2. Friday, 21:00. Saray Spor Tesisleri, Ankara. Goals: Nobre 32', Kamanan 48'.
- 14.08.2011 - MKE Ankaragücü-MİY: 4–0. Sunday, 21:00. classification game.

After TRT Cup played in Ankara, MİY remained in Ankaragücü sports complex. Three more preparation games were played before the start of the season:

- 21.08.2011 - MİY-Kasımpaşa: 1-1. Sunday. Yenikent Asaş Stadium, Ankara. Goal: Joseph Boum.
- 25.08.2011 - Gaziantepspor-MİY: 2-2. Thursday. Kamil Ocak Stadium, Gaziantep. Goals: Kamanan 17', Nduka 85'.
- 27.08.2011 - Konyaspor-MİY: 2–1. Saturday, 21:00. Atatürk Stadium, Konya. Goals: Kamanan 49', İbrahim Kaş 69' (o.g.).

== 2011–12 Süper Lig participation ==
Mersin İdmanyurdu participated in 2011–12 Süper Lig. The league was played as "Spor-Toto Süper Lig" in that season due to sponsorship reasons. 18 teams attended. A play-off system introduced for the first time in league history. Top four teams play two-leg league system play-offs. The winners and runners-up of the play-off were qualify for 2012–13 UEFA Champions League (ECL). The team who finished the league at first place qualifies for ECL even if they could not finish the play-offs at top two places. The third team qualifies for 2012–13 UEFA Europa League (UEL). Second team who qualifies for UEL is determined by another play-off which is played by the teams who finished the normal season at 5th through 8th places. Bottom three teams relegate to 2012–13 TFF Second League. The start date of the league is 10 September 2011 and end date of normal season is 8 April 2012.

Mersin İdmanyurdu finished 2011–12 Süper Lig season at 14th place and did not participate in play-offs but remained in the league.

=== Results summary ===
Mersin İdmanyurdu (MİY) 2011–12 Süper Lig season results summary.

	Overall									Home								Away							
Stage	Pc	Pl	W	D	L	GF	GA	GD	Pt	Pl	W	D	L	GF	GA	GD	Pt	Pl	W	D	L	GF	GA	GD	Pt
First half	6	17	7	6	4	20	16	+4	27	9	3	3	3	8	8	0	12	8	4	3	1	12	8	+4	15
Second half		17	5	0	12	14	29	-15	15	8	2	0	6	7	16	-9	6	9	3	0	6	7	13	-6	9
Owerall	14	34	12	6	16	34	45	-11	42	17	5	3	9	15	24	-9	18	17	7	3	7	19	21	-2	24

Sources: 2011–12 Süper Lig pages.

=== League table ===
Mersin İdmanyurdu (MİY) 2011–12 Süper Lig season standing in league table after normal season:

Pos	Team	Pld	W	D	L	GF	GA	GD	Pts
11	Kayserispor	34	13	5	16	42	39	+3	44 (Note: Kayserispor were ahead of Kardemir Karabükspor on head-to-head record: Kayserispor–Kardemir Karabükspor 2–0, Kardemir Karabükspor–Kayserispor 1–0.)
12	Kardemir Karabükspor	34	13	5	16	44	56	−12	44
13	Mersin İdman Yurdu	34	12	6	16	34	45	−11	42 (Note: Mersin İdman Yurdu were ahead of Orduspor on head-to-head record: Mersin İdman Yurdu–Orduspor 1–0, Orduspor–Mersin İdman Yurdu 0–1.)
14	Orduspor	34	10	12	12	28	34	−6	42
15	Antalyaspor	34	10	9	15	32	42	−10	39

Source: TFF's official Süper Lig website
Rules for classification: 1) points; 2) goal difference; 3) number of goals scored.

=== Results by round ===
Mersin İdmanyurdu (MİY) 2011–12 Süper Lig season standing in league table after normal season:

Round	1	2	3	4	5	6	7	8	9	10	11	12	13	14	15	16	17	18	19	20	21	22	23	24	25	26	27	28	29	30	31	32	33	34
Ground	A	H	A	H	A	H	H	A	H	A	H	A	H	A	H	A	H	H	A	H	A	H	A	A	H	A	H	A	H	A	H	A	H	A
Result	W	L	W	W	D	L	L	L	W	D	D	W	D	D	W	W	D	L	L	L	L	L	L	W	L	W	L	W	W	L	W	L	L	L
Position	6	12	7	4	5	6	10	12	8	9	9	7	8	8	7	5	6	7	8	8	8	10	13	11	12	12	13	11	10	11	10	11	12	13

Updated to match(es) played on 8 January 2012. Source: TFF League page
A = Away; H = Home; W = Win; D = Draw; L = Loss

=== First half ===
Mersin İdmanyurdu (MİY) 2011–12 Süper Lig season first half game reports is shown in the following table. Kick off times are in EET and EEST.

10 September 2011 Round 1	MKE Ankaragücü	1 – 2	Mersin İdmanyurdu	19 Mayıs Stadium, Ankara
Saturday, 20:00	Serdar Özkan 85' (F); Theo Weeks (yellow card) 49'	Report	48' (H) Márcio Nobre; 56' (F) Márcio Nobre; (yellow card) 88' Hakan Arıkan; (yellow card) 89' Mustafa Keçeli	Referee: Koray Gençerler

18 September 2011 Round 2	Mersin İdmanyurdu	1 – 3	Bursaspor	Tevfik Sırrı Gür Stadium, Mersin
Sunday, 16:00	Nduka Ozokwo 5' (F); Mustafa Keçeli (yellow card) 38'; Márcio Nobre (yellow card) 51'; André Moritz (yellow card) 65'; İbrahim Kaş (yellow card) 90'	Report	15' (o.g.) Joseph Boum; 47' (F) Teteh Bangura; 90' (H) Turgay Bahadır; (yellow card) 28' Teteh Bangura; (yellow card) 85' Prince Tagoe; (yellow card) 86' Turgay Bahadır	Referee: Hüseyin Göçek

21 September 2011 Round 3	MP Antalyaspor	1 – 2	Mersin İdmanyurdu	Mardan Sports Complex, Antalya
Wednesday, 20:00	Veselin Minev 21' (o.g.); Uğur İnceman 48' (H); Sedat Ağçay (yellow card) 30'; Uğur İnceman (yellow card) 73'; Ali Zitouni (yellow card) 79'; Necati Ateş (yellow card) 88'; Ali Tandoğan (yellow card) 89'	Report	86' (F) Beto; (yellow card) 44' André Moritz; (yellow card) 51' Márcio Nobre; (yellow card) 77' İbrahim Kaş; (yellow card) 88' Mehmet Polat	Referee: Mustafa İlker Coşkun

24 September 2011 Round 4	Mersin İdmanyurdu	2 – 0	Gaziantepspor	Tevfik Sırrı Gür Stadium, Mersin
Saturday, 18:00	André Moritz 35' (P); Márcio Nobre 49' (F); Beto (yellow card) 80'	Report	(yellow card) 16' Wágner	Referee: Aytekin Durmaz

2 October 2011 Round 5	Kayserispor	2 – 2	Mersin İdmanyurdu	BB Kadir Has Stadium, Kayseri
Sunday, 19:00	Gökhan Ünal 21' (F); Gökhan Ünal 73' (F); Eren Güngör (yellow card) 15'; Jonathan Santana (yellow card) 24'; Nicolás Navarro (red card) 40'; Gökhan Ünal (yellow card) 73'	Report	23' Márcio Nobre; 42' Márcio Nobre; (yellow card) 34' André Moritz; (yellow card) 50' (red card) İlhan Özbay; (yellow card) 68' Mustafa Keçeli; (yellow card) 72' İbrahim Kaş; (yellow card) 78' Matthew Amoah	Referee: Tolga Özkalfa

17 October 2011 Round 6	Mersin İdmanyurdu	1 – 2	Fenerbahçe	Tevfik Sırrı Gür Stadium, Mersin
Monday, 20:00	Beto 90+1' (F); Wissem Ben Yahia (yellow card) 39'; André Moritz (yellow card) 42'; İbrahim Kaş (yellow card) 55' (red card); Christian Rodrigo Zurita (yellow card) 57'; Mehmet Polat (yellow card) 79'	Report	4' (F) Özer Hurmacı; 53' (F) Henri Bienvenu; (yellow card) 69' Reto Ziegler	Referee: Halis Özkahya

24 October 2011 Round 7	Mersin İdmanyurdu	0 – 1	Beşiktaş	Tevfik Sırrı Gür Stadium, Mersin
Monday, 20:00	Joseph Boum (yellow card) 5'; Çağdaş Atan (yellow card) 28'; Christian Rodrigo Zurita (yellow card) 55'	Report	19' (F) Mustafa Pektemek; (yellow card) 29' Simão Sabrosa; (yellow card) 57' Roberto Hilbert; (yellow card) 66' Tomáš Sivok	Referee: Cüneyt Çakır

27 October 2011 Round 8	Sivasspor	1 – 0	Mersin İdmanyurdu	4 Eylül Stadium, Sivas
Thursday, 18:30	Michael Eneramo 22' (F); Michael Eneramo (yellow card) 22'; Kadir Bekmezci (yellow card) 36'; Kamil Grosicki (yellow card) 50'; Mahmut Boz (yellow card) 90'	Report	(yellow card) 41' Joseph Boum; (yellow card) 42' Ibrahim Šehić; (yellow card) 87' İbrahim Kaş; (yellow card) 90' Christian Rodrigo Zurita	Referee: Hüseyin Göçek

31 October 2011 Round 9	Mersin İdmanyurdu	2 – 1	Gençlerbirliği	Tevfik Sırrı Gür Stadium, Mersin
Monday, 20:00	Erman Özgür 6' (F); André Moritz 31' (F); Çağdaş Atan (yellow card) 36'; Joseph Boum (red card) 47'; Nduka Ozokwo (yellow card) 80'	Report	89' (H) Hervé Tum; (yellow card) 81' Serkan Çalık	Referee: Yunus Yıldırım

5 November 2011 Round 10	Galatasaray	0 – 0	Mersin İdmanyurdu	Türk Telekom Arena, Istanbul
Saturday, 19:00	Fernando Muslera (yellow card) 45'; Semih Kaya (yellow card) 83'	Report	(yellow card) 12' İbrahim Kaş; (yellow card) 21' Wissem Ben Yahia; (yellow card) 23' Márcio Nobre; (yellow card) 82' Çağdaş Atan	Referee: Fırat Aydınus

18 November 2011 Round 11	Mersin İdmanyurdu	1 – 1	Trabzonspor	Tevfik Sırrı Gür Stadium, Mersin
Friday, 20:00	Giray Kaçar 69' (o.g.); Wissem Ben Yahia (yellow card) 36'; Christian Rodrigo Zurita (yellow card) 83'; Çağdaş Atan (yellow card) 86'; Hasan Üçüncü (yellow card) 89'	Report	80' (o.g.) André Moritz	Referee: Hüseyin Göçek

26 November 2011 Round 12	Orduspor	0 – 1	Mersin İdmanyurdu	19 Eylül Stadium, Ordu
Saturday, 16:00	Sedat Bayrak (yellow card) 63'; Fatih Tekke (yellow card) 66'; Hakan Özmert (yellow card) 88'	Report	63' (F) Márcio Nobre; (yellow card) 44' Joseph Boum; (yellow card) 81' Ibrahim Šehić	Referee: Koray Gençerler

4 December 2011 Round 13	Mersin İdmanyurdu	0 – 0	Manisaspor	Tevfik Sırrı Gür Stadium, Mersin
Sunday, 16:00	Çağdaş Atan (red card) 59'; André Moritz (yellow card) 63'; Mustafa Keçeli (yellow card) 68'	Report	(yellow card) 35' Yiğit İncedemir	Referee: Kuddusi Müftüoğlu

8 December 2011 Round 14	İstanbul BŞB	0 – 0	Mersin İdmanyurdu	Atatürk Olympic Stadium, Istanbul
Thursday, 18:00	Metin Akan (yellow card) 52'; Metin Depe (yellow card) 74'; Gökhan Süzen (yellow card) 78'; İbrahim Yılmaz (yellow card) 89'	Report	(yellow card) 32' İlhan Özbay; (yellow card) 42' Nduka Ozokwo; (yellow card) 61' Christian Rodrigo Zurita; (yellow card) 65' Hasan Üçüncü; (yellow card) 71' İbrahim Kaş; (yellow card) 85' Joseph Boum	Referee: Abdullah Yılmaz

11 December 2011 Round 15	Mersin İdmanyurdu	1 – 0	Samsunspor	Tevfik Sırrı Gür Stadium, Mersin
Sunday, 16:00	Beto 85' (F); Nurullah Kaya (yellow card) 65'; Márcio Nobre (yellow card) 89' (red card)	Report	(yellow card) 89' André Bahia; (yellow card) 89' Murat Yıldırım	Referee: Tolga Özkalfa

17 December 2011 Round 16	Kardemir DÇ Karabükspor	3 – 5	Mersin İdmanyurdu	N. Şeyhoğlu Stadium, Karabük
Saturday, 13:00	İlhan Parlak 3' (F); Bilal Kısa 10' (F); Florin Cernat 23' (F); Anthony Šerić (yellow card) 31'; Hocine Ragued (yellow card) 79'; Hamza Çakır (yellow card) 82'; Armand Deumi (yellow card) 86' (red card); Florin Cernat (yellow card) 87'; Sinan Kaloğlu (yellow card) 90'	Report	16' (F) André Moritz; 25' (F) André Moritz; 55' (F) Beto; 87' (P) Nduka Ozokwo; 90' (F) Wissem Ben Yahia; (yellow card) 74' İbrahim Kaş; (yellow card) 82' Çağdaş Atan; (yellow card) 85' Christian Rodrigo Zurita	Referee: Bülent Yıldırım

21 December 2011 Round 17	Mersin İdmanyurdu	0 – 0	Eskişehirspor	Tevfik Sırrı Gür Stadium, Mersin
Wednesday, 18:00	Nduka Ozokwo (yellow card) 26'; Christian Rodrigo Zurita (yellow card) 66'; Wissem Ben Yahia (yellow card) 76'	Report	(yellow card) 21' Diego Ângelo; (yellow card) 44' Dedé; (yellow card) 61' Diomansy Kamara; (yellow card) 78' Bülent Ertuğrul; (yellow card) 84' Alper Potuk	Referee: Süleyman Abay

Sources: 2011–12 Süper Lig pages.

=== Second half ===
Mersin İdmanyurdu (MİY) 2011–12 Süper Lig season second half game reports is shown in the following table. Kick off times are in EET and EEST.

3 January 2012 Round 18	Mersin İdmanyurdu	1 – 2	MKE Ankaragücü	Tevfik Sırrı Gür Stadium, Mersin
Wednesday, 20:30	Erman Özgür 67' (F); İbrahim Kaş (yellow card) 81'; Márcio Nobre (yellow card) 84'; André Moritz (yellow card) 88'	Report	1' (F) Ergin Keleş; 70' (F) Ergin Keleş; (yellow card) 64' Turgut Doğan Şahin; (yellow card) 89' Gürkan Alver	Referee: Çağatay Şahan

7 January 2012 Round 19	Bursaspor	1 – 0	Mersin İdmanyurdu	Atatürk Stadium, Bursa
Saturday, 16:00	Pablo Batalla 89' (F); Michaël Chrétien Basser (yellow card) 38'; Mehmet Sak (yellow card) 89'	Report	(yellow card) 16' Mustafa Keçeli; (yellow card) 23' Beto; (yellow card) 57' Danilo Bueno; (yellow card) 72' Joseph Boum; (yellow card) 73' Ibrahim Šehić; (yellow card) 78' Hasan Üçüncü; (yellow card) 85' Christian Rodrigo Zurita	Referee: Cüneyt Çakır

15 January 2012 Round 20	Mersin İdmanyurdu	0 – 2	MP Antalyaspor	Tevfik Sırrı Gür Stadium, Mersin
Sunday, 14:00	Joseph Boum (yellow card) 42'; André Moritz (yellow card) 55'	Report	12' (F) Tita; 25' (F) Ali Zitouni	Referee: Bülent Yıldırım

20 January 2012 Round 21	Gaziantepspor	1 – 0	Mersin İdmanyurdu	Kamil Ocak Stadium, Gaziantep
Friday, 18:00	Ivelin Popov 8' (F); Şenol Can (yellow card) 61'; Žydrūnas Karčemarskas (yellow card) 65'	Report	(yellow card) 20' Hasan Üçüncü	Referee: Koray Gençerler

24 January 2012 Round 22	Mersin İdmanyurdu	1 – 2	Kayserispor	Tevfik Sırrı Gür Stadium, Mersin
Tuesday, 18:30	Spas Delev 53' (F); Erman Özgür (yellow card) 25'; Danilo Bueno (yellow card) 45'; Márcio Nobre (yellow card) 60'	Report	59' (F) Emir Kujović; 74' (F) Emir Kujović; (yellow card) 33' Abdullah Durak; (yellow card) 64' Zurab Khizanishvili; (yellow card) 67' Cristian Riveros; (yellow card) 74' Emir Kujović	Referee: Mete Kalkavan

29 January 2012 Round 23	Fenerbahçe	2 – 1	Mersin İdmanyurdu	Şükrü Saracoğlu Stadium, Istanbul
Sunday, 17:00	Henri Bienvenu 7' (F); Miroslav Stoch 39' (F); Orhan Şam (yellow card) 77'	Report	57' (H) Nduka Ozokwo; (yellow card) 47' Nduka Ozokwo; (yellow card) 73' Çağdaş Atan; (yellow card) 89' Erdal Kılıçaslan	Referee: Barış Şimşek

2 February 2012 Round 24	Beşiktaş	0 – 1	Mersin İdmanyurdu	BJK İnönü Stadium, Beşiktaş, Istanbul
Thursday, 19:30	Egemen Korkmaz (yellow card) 32'; Ricardo Quaresma (red card) 84'; İbrahim Toraman (yellow card) 87'	Report	43' (F) Erdal Kılıçaslan; (yellow card) 65' Danilo Bueno; (yellow card) 87' Erhan Güven	Referee: Kuddusi Müftüoğlu

5 February 2012 Round 25	Mersin İdmanyurdu	1 – 5	Sivasspor	Tevfik Sırrı Gür Stadium, Mersin
Sunday, 12:00	Tonia Tisdell 50' (F); Ibrahim Šehić (yellow card) 8'; Joseph Boum (yellow card) 12'; Danilo Bueno (yellow card) 38'; Christian Rodrigo Zurita (yellow card) 90'	Report	7' (F) Kıvanç Karakaş; 48' (F) Erman Kılıç; 56' (F) Kıvanç Karakaş; 63' (F) Erman Kılıç; 89' (H) Jan Rajnoch; (yellow card) 90' Ziya Erdal	Referee: Tolga Özkalfa

11 February 2012 Round 26	Gençlerbirliği	1 – 2	Mersin İdmanyurdu	19 Mayıs Stadium, Ankara
Saturday, 16:00	Randall Azofeifa 89' (P); Yasin Öztekin (yellow card) 89'	Report	54' (F) Wissem Ben Yahia; 87' (F) Márcio Nobre; (yellow card) 42' Márcio Nobre; (yellow card) 69' Mustafa Keçeli; (yellow card) 88' Çağdaş Atan; (yellow card) 89' Hakan Arıkan	Referee: İlker Meral

17 February 2012 Round 27	Mersin İdmanyurdu	1 – 3	Galatasaray	Tevfik Sırrı Gür Stadium, Mersin
Friday, 20:00	Erhan Güven 76' (F); Barış Ataş (yellow card) 57' (red card); İbrahim Kaş (yellow card) 82'; Erhan Güven (yellow card) 87'; Mustafa Keçeli (yellow card) post-match'	Report	29' (H) Necati Ateş; 82' (P) Selçuk İnan; 89' (F) Necati Ateş; (yellow card) 63' Semih Kaya	Referee: Tolga Özkalfa

26 February 2012 Round 28	Trabzonspor	2 – 3	Mersin İdmanyurdu	Hüseyin Avni Aker Stadium, Trabzon
Sunday, 16:00	Hamit Altıntop 60' (F); Olcan Adın 83' (F); Giray Kaçar (yellow card) 68'; Alanzinho (yellow card) 72'	Report	33' (F) Márcio Nobre; 46' (F) Márcio Nobre; 88' (F) Hasan Üçüncü; (yellow card) 50' Danilo Bueno; (yellow card) 63' Joseph Boum; (yellow card) 72' Wissem Ben Yahia	Referee: Yunus Yıldırım

3 March 2012 Round 29	Mersin İdmanyurdu	1 – 0	Orduspor	Tevfik Sırrı Gür Stadium, Mersin
Saturday, 14:00	Spas Delev 16' (F); Erhan Güven (yellow card) 6'; Çağdaş Atan (yellow card) 43'; Erman Özgür (yellow card) 50'; İbrahim Kaş (yellow card) 59'; Hakan Arıkan (yellow card) 89'	Report	(yellow card) 82' Emmanuel Culio	Referee: Süleyman Abay

11 March 2012 Round 30	Manisaspor	2 – 0	Mersin İdmanyurdu	19 Mayıs Stadium, Manisa
Sunday, 13:00	Isaac Promise 70' (F); Isaac Promise 89' (F); Ferhat Çökmüş (yellow card) 60'; Yiğit İncedemir (yellow card) 75'; Bekir Yılmaz (yellow card) 88'	Report	(yellow card) 53' Joseph Boum; (yellow card) 57' Hakan Bayraktar; (yellow card) 75' Wissem Ben Yahia; (yellow card) 79' Tonia Tisdell	Referee: Abdullah Yılmaz

18 March 2012 Round 31	Mersin İdmanyurdu	2 – 0	İstanbul BŞB	Tevfik Sırrı Gür Stadium, Mersin
Sunday, 15:00	Márcio Nobre 7' (F); Danilo Bueno 89' (F); Danilo Bueno (yellow card) 27'; Mustafa Keçeli (yellow card) 50'; Hakan Bayraktar (yellow card) 85'; André Moritz (yellow card) 86'	Report	(yellow card) 23' Mahmut Tekdemir; (yellow card) 44' Metin Depe; (yellow card) 77' Doka Madureira; (yellow card) 89' (red card) Efe İnanç	Referee: Hüseyin Sabancı

25 March 2012 Round 32	Samsunspor	2 – 0	Mersin İdmanyurdu	19 Mayıs Stadium, Samsun
Sunday, 15:30	Ekigho Ehiosun 17' (H); Ekigho Ehiosun 67' (F); Dejan Kelhar (yellow card) 29'; Uğur Boral (yellow card) 44'	Report	(yellow card) 19' Wissem Ben Yahia; (red card) 21' Márcio Nobre; (yellow card) 45' Nurullah Kaya; (yellow card) 51' (red card) İbrahim Kaş	Referee: Fırat Aydınus

30 March 2012 Round 33	Mersin İdmanyurdu	0 – 2	KDÇ Karabükspor	Tevfik Sırrı Gür Stadium, Mersin
Friday, 20:00	Wissem Ben Yahia (yellow card) 52'; André Moritz (yellow card) 63'	Report	Mehmet Yıldız 3' (F); Mustafa Sarp 54' (F)	Referee: Mustafa Kamil Abitoğlu

7 April 2012 Round 34	Eskişehirspor	2 – 0	Mersin İdmanyurdu	Atatürk Stadium, Eskişehir
Saturday, 19:00	Diomansy Kamara 20' (F); Rodrigo Tello 37' (F); Rodrigo Tello (yellow card) 64'; Safet Nadarević (yellow card) 81'	Report	(yellow card) 29' Danilo Bueno; (yellow card) 34' Çağdaş Atan; (yellow card) 64' İbrahim Kaş	Referee: Bülent Yıldırım

Sources: 2011–12 Süper Lig pages.

== 2011–12 Turkish Cup participation ==
Mersin İdmanyurdu has participated in 2011–12 Turkish Cup from the third round. Turkish Cup has been played in its 50th season with 57 teams as Ziraat Türkiye Kupası for sponsorship reasons. It was played in four elimination rounds and finals in one-leg elimination system. MİY took place in third elimination round and eliminated to Sivasspor. Sivasspor has been eliminated by Galatasaray in the fourth elimination round and Galatasaray was eliminated by Bursaspor in quarterfinals. Bursaspor has lost finals to Fenerbahçe who won the cup for the 5th time. Fenerbahçe had won its 4th Cup 29 seasons before against MİY in finals of 1982–83 Turkish Cup.

=== Cup track ===
The drawings and results Mersin İdmanyurdu (MİY) followed in 2011–12 Turkish Cup are shown in the following table.

Round	Own League	Opponent's League	Opponent	A/H	Score	Result
Round 3	Süper Lig	Süper Lig	Sivasspor	H	1–3	Eliminated

Note: In the above table 'Score' shows For and Against goals whether the match played at home or not.

=== Game details ===
Mersin İdmanyurdu (MİY) 2011–12 Turkish Cup game reports is shown in the following table. Kick off times are in EET and EEST.

11 January 2012 3rd Round	Mersin İdmanyurdu	1 – 3 (a.e.t.)	Sivasspor	Tevfik Sırrı Gür Stadium, Mersin
Wednesday, 18:00	Nurullah Kaya 15' (F); İlhan Özbay (yellow card) 26'; Mustafa Keçeli (yellow card) 73'; André Moritz (yellow card) 82'; Cenker Pehlivan (yellow card) 119'	Report	32' (F) Cihan Özkara; 97' (F) Uğur Kavuk; 105' (F) Michael Eneramo; (yellow card) 28' Kıvanç Karakaş; (yellow card) 48' Kağan Timurcin Konuk; (yellow card) 71' Tomáš Rada; (yellow card) 74' Murat Akça; (yellow card) 112' (red card) Jan Rajnoch; (yellow card) 115' Nihat Şahin	Referee: Abdullah Yılmaz

Source: 2011–12 Ziraat Turkish Cup pages.

== Management ==
- Club address was: Hamidiye Mah., İsmet İnönü Blv., Sevim Çalışkan Apt. No: 3/3, Mersin.
- Kit: Uniform Manufacturer: Hummel International. Chest Advertising's: SOIL. Back Advertising's: BPet. Shorts Advertising's: Özbal Çelik Boru.

=== Club management ===
- Executive committee: Mersin İdmanyurdu Sports Club president and managerial board members are elected by general vote of club members. Last election was held in September 2008. President: Ali Kahramanlı. Deputy Chairman: Abdi Kurt. Vice Presidents: Ayhan Erdem, Mustafa Ağaoğlu, Nuh Yüksel Güngör, Şerefettin Kadooğlu, Beşir Acar. Football Assistants in Charge of the Branch: Erhan Contar, Mehmet Hanifi Işık. Boxing Assistant in Charge of the Branch: Nafiz Deniz. Handball Assistant in Charge of the Branch: Onur Ünlü. Treasurer: M.Galip Akyollu. General Secretary: Senan İdin. General Manager: Salih Baysal. Press Agent: Celal Ata. Executive Committee Members: Ali Sönmez, H.Tufan Ballı, Sultan Torlak. Stadium Authority: İbrahim Çakar.
- Other Personnel: General Manager: Murat Öğ. Financial Advisor: Sedat Aydöner. Club's Lawyer: Av.Osman Akgöç. Assistant General Manager: Burak Adanalı. Drivers: Ökkeş Aybar, Mustafa Kaya. Accountant: Özcan Ulusoy. Secretary: Duygu Gürani. Servant: Fatma Dağkaya.
- Help Team: Physiotherapist: Mustafa Bozkurt. Interpreter: Berkant Demir. Masseurs: Ersoy Şenel, Kadir Ekinci. Outfitters: Ahmet Aksoylu, Ercan Şenol. Source: Club home page.

=== Coaching team ===
- During all season: Coach: Nurullah Sağlam. Trainer:İsmet Savcılıoğlu. Goalkeeper trainer: Sadık Öztürk. General manager: Serkan Damla.

2011–12 Mersin İdmanyurdu head coaches

Nat	Head coach	Period	Pl	W	D	L	Notes
(Turkey)	Nurullah Sağlam	11.07.2011 – 31.05.2012	35	12	6	17	Continued in the next season.

Note: Only official games were included.

== 2011–12 squad ==
Appearances, goals and cards count for 2011–12 Süper Lig and 2011–12 Turkish Cup games. Only the players who appeared in game rosters were included. Kit numbers were allowed to select by players. 18 players appeared in each game roster, three to be replaced. Players are listed in order of appearance.

O	N	Nat	Name	Birth	Born	Pos	LA	LG	CA	CG	TA	TG	Booked	Sent off (straight red)	← Season Notes →
1	1	(Turkey)	Hakan Arıkan	17 Aug 1982	Karamürsel	GK	11		1		12		3		2011 ST Beşiktaş.
2	3	(Cameroon)	Joseph Boum	26 Sep 1989	Yaoundé	DF	29		1		30		9	1	→ previous season.
3	5	(Turkey)	Erman Özgür	13 Apr 1977	Kartal	MF	19	2			19	2	2		→ previous season.
4	7	(Nigeria)	Nduka Ozokwo	25 Dec 1988	Enugu	MF	28	3	1		29	3	4		→ previous season.
5	8	(Argentina)	Christian Zurita	24 Jul 1979	Salta	MF	25				25		9		2011 ST Gaziantepspor.
6	10	(Brazil)	André Moritz	6 Aug 1986	Florianópolis	MF	32	4	1		33	4	10		2011 ST Kayserispor
7	11	(Brazil)	Márcio Nobre	6 Nov 1980	Jateí	FW	26	10	1		27	10	7	2	2011 ST Beşiktaş.
8	13	(Tunisia)	Wissem Ben Yahia	9 Sep 1984	Tunis	MF	25	2			25	2	8		2011 ST Club Africain.
9	23	(Turkey)	Mustafa Keçeli	15 Sep 1978	Ankara	DF	29		1		30		9		2011 ST Bursaspor.
10	44	(Turkey)	Erhan Güven	15 May 1982	Ankara	DF	28	1	1		29	1	3		2011 ST Beşiktaş.
11	78	(Turkey)	İbrahim Kaş	20 Sep 1986	Karabük	DF	23				23		13	2	2011 SL Bursaspor.
12	12	(Bosnia and Herzegovina)	Ibrahim Šehić	2 Sep 1988	Rogatica	GK	22				22		4		2011 ST Željezničar.
13	19	(Turkey)	Mehmet Polat	8 Jun 1978	Gaziantep	DF	4				4		2		→ previous season.
14	25	(Brazil)	Beto	2 Oct 1981	São Carlos	FW	18	4			18	4	2		2011 ST Gaziantepspor.
15	39	(Turkey)	Cenker Pehlivan	15 Nov 1990	Lüleburgaz	FW			1		1				→ previous season.
16	50	(France)	Yannick Kamanan	5 Oct 1981	Saint-Pol	FW	8				8				2011 ST Sivasspor.
17	55	(Turkey)	Hakan Bayraktar	11 Feb 1976	Samsun	MF	23				23		2		2011 ST Samsunspor.
18	66	(Turkey)	İlhan Özbay	19 Sep 1982	Şefaatli	MF	15		1		16		2	1	→ previous season.
19	4	(Turkey)	Çağdaş Atan	28 Feb 1980	İzmir	DF	27		1		28		9	1	2011 ST FC Basel.
20	14	(Ghana)	Mathew Amoah	24 Oct 1980	Tema	FW	5				5		1		2011 ST NAC Breda.
21	15	(Turkey)	Hasan Üçüncü	16 Nov 1980	Sürmene	MF	10	1	1		11	1	4		→ previous season.
22	22	(Liechtenstein)	Cengiz Biçer	11 Dec 1987	Grabs	GK	2				2				→ previous season.
23	91	(Turkey)	Emre Gürbüz	25 Mar 1991	Mersin	MF									→ previous season.
24	27	(Turkey)	Ferdi Coşkun	20 Apr 1987	Gaziantep	MF	5				5				2011 SL Gaziantepspor.
25	33	(Turkey)	Nurullah Kaya	20 Jul 1986	Batman	MF	9		1	1	10	1	2		→ previous season.
26	21	(Brazil)	Danilo Bueno	7 Dec 1983	São Paulo	MF	15	1	1		16	1	7		2012 WT Étoile du Sahel.
27	88	(Turkey)	Tarık Altuntaş	23 Aug 1991	Bor	MF	1				1				→ previous season.
28	77	(Bulgaria)	Spas Delev	22 Sep 1989	Petrich	FW	12	2			12	2			2012 WT CSKA Sofia.
29	17	(Turkey)	Erdal Kılıçaslan	23 Aug 1984	Munich	MF	8	1			8	1	1		2012 WT Gençlerbirliği.
30	2	(Liberia)	Tonia Tisdell	20 Mar 1992	Monrovia	MF	8	1			8	1	1		2012 WL Ankaraspor.
31	18	(Turkey)	Barış Ataş	1 Feb 1987	Kulp	MF	6				6		1	1	2012 WL Trabzonspor.

Sources: TFF club page and maçkolik team page.

== U-21 team ==
Mersin İdmanyurdu U-21 team had participated in 2011–12 A2 League. League was played in three stages. In the first stage, 37 teams played ranking group games in 4 groups on regional basis. 3 consisted of 9 and 1 consisted of 10 teams. In the second stage winners and runners-up of each ranking group constituted final group while the rest played classification group games. In the third stage, winners of classification groups played quarterfinals with first four placed teams in final group. Mersin idmanyurdu U-21 team took place in Ranking Group 4 and finished 8th in the first stage. In the second stage the team took place in Classification Group 4 and finished 5th with 9 wins, 8 deuces and 15 losses.

== See also ==
- Football in Turkey
