= List of Turkish football transfers summer 2011 =

This is a list of Turkish football transfers for the summer sale in 2011–12 season. Only moves to and from the Süper Lig are listed.

The summer transfer window officially began on 14 June 2011, although a few transfers took place prior to that date. The window closed at midnight on 5 September 2011. Players without a club could have joined one at any time, either during or in between transfer windows. Clubs below Süper Lig level could also have signed players on loan at any time. If there is need, clubs could have signed a goalkeeper on an emergency loan, if all others were unavailable.

== Summer 2011 transfer window ==
Date	Name	Moving from	Moving to	Fee
2011-08-10	(Turkey) Arda Turan	(Turkey) Galatasaray	(Spain) Atlético Madrid	€12M
2011-07-28	(Nigeria) Emmanuel Emenike	(Turkey) Fenerbahçe	(Russia) Spartak Moscow	€10M
2011-05-25	(Nigeria) Emmanuel Emenike	(Turkey) Karabükspor	(Turkey) Fenerbahçe	€9M
2011-09-05	(Senegal) Mamadou Niang	(Turkey) Fenerbahçe	(Qatar) Al Sadd	€7.5M
2011-08-31	(Brazil) André Santos	(Turkey) Fenerbahçe	(England) Arsenal	€7M
2011-07-20	(Uruguay) Fernando Muslera	(Italy) Lazio	(Turkey) Galatasaray	€6.75+Lorik Cana
2011-06-16	(Poland) Adrian Mierzejewski	(Poland) Polonia Warszawa	(Turkey) Trabzonspor	€5.25M
2011-05-30	(Ivory Coast) Didier Zokora	(Spain) Sevilla	(Turkey) Trabzonspor	€5M
2011-05-27	(Turkey) (Germany) Serdar Kesimal	(Turkey) Kayserispor	(Turkey) Fenerbahçe	€4.5M+Gökhan Ünal
2011-05-27	(Turkey) Mustafa Pektemek	(Turkey) Gençlerbirliği	(Turkey) Beşiktaş	€4M+Ali Kuçik
2011-06-06	(Turkey) (Australia) Ersan Gülüm	(Turkey) Adanaspor	(Turkey) Beşiktaş	€4M
2011-05-30	(Brazil) Paulo Henrique	(Brazil) Desportivo Brasil	(Turkey) Trabzonspor	€4M
2011-09-05	(Cameroon) Henri Bienvenu	(Switzerland) Young Boys	(Turkey) Fenerbahçe	€4M
2011-08-29	(Turkey) Volkan Şen	(Turkey) Bursaspor	(Turkey) Trabzonspor	€3.6M
2011-05-27	(Turkey) Orhan Şam	(Turkey) Gençlerbirliği	(Turkey) Fenerbahçe	€3.5M
2011-08-16	(Ivory Coast) Emmanuel Eboué	(England) Arsenal	(Turkey) Galatasaray	€3.5M
2011-08-27	(Uruguay) Diego Lugano	(Turkey) Fenerbahçe	(France) Paris Saint-Germain	€3.5M
2011-09-02	(Brazil) (Portugal) Júlio Regufe Alves	(Spain) Atlético Madrid	(Turkey) Beşiktaş	€3.1M
2011-09-05	(Turkey) Sercan Yıldırım	(Turkey) Bursaspor	(Turkey) Galatasaray	€3M+Musa Çağıran
2011-09-03	(Spain) Albert Riera	(Greece) Olympiacos	(Turkey) Galatasaray	€3M
2011-06-17	(Turkey) Sezer Öztürk	(Turkey) Eskişehirspor	(Turkey) Fenerbahçe	€2.75M+Abdülkadir Kayalı
2011-08-18	(Spain) Daniel Güiza	(Turkey) Fenerbahçe	(Spain) Getafe	€2M
2011-06-20	(Czech Republic) Tomáš Ujfaluši	(Spain) Atlético Madrid	(Turkey) Galatasaray	€1.5M
2011-07-22	(Brazil) Felipe Melo	(Italy) Juventus	(Turkey) Galatasaray	Loan: €1.5M
2011-07-02	(Brazil) (Japan) Rodrigo Tabata	(Turkey) Beşiktaş	(Qatar) Al-Rayyan	€1.15M
2011-08-20	(Turkey) (Germany) Engin Baytar	(Turkey) Trabzonspor	(Turkey) Galatasaray	€1.1M
2011-05-27	(Turkey) (Austria) Tanju Kayhan	(Austria) Rapid Wien	(Turkey) Beşiktaş	€1.05M
2011-05-27	(Turkey) (Austria) Yasin Pehlivan	(Austria) Rapid Wien	(Turkey) Gaziantepspor	€1M
2011-06-10	(Portugal) Bébé	(England) Manchester United	(Turkey) Beşiktaş	Loan: €1M
2011-05-27	(Turkey) (Austria) Veli Kavlak	(Austria) Rapid Wien	(Turkey) Beşiktaş	€0.75M
2011-06-12	(Turkey) (Germany) Sefa Yılmaz	(Germany) MSV Duisburg	(Turkey) Kayserispor	€0.7M
2011-05-27	(Turkey) (Germany) Burak Kaplan	(Germany) Bayer Leverkusen	(Turkey) Beşiktaş	€0.65M
2011-05-27	(Turkey) (Germany) Taşkın Çalış	(Germany) Borussia Mönchengladbach	(Turkey) Gaziantepspor	€0.65M
2011-06-09	(Turkey) (Germany) Aykut Akgün	(Turkey) Karşıyaka S.K.	(Turkey) Trabzonspor	€0.6M
2011-09-03	(Switzerland) Reto Ziegler	(Italy) Juventus	(Turkey) Fenerbahçe	Loan: €0.6M
2011-09-02	(Brazil) Edu	(Germany) Schalke 04	(Turkey) Beşiktaş	Loan: €0.5M
2011-06-03	(Turkey) Mehmet Akyüz	(Turkey) TKİ Tavşanlı Linyitspor	(Turkey) Beşiktaş	€0.4M
2011-08-29	(Colombia) Juan Pablo Pino	(Turkey) Galatasaray	(Saudi Arabia) Al-Nassr	Loan: €0.4M
2011-08-06	(Argentina) Emmanuel Culio	(Turkey) Galatasaray	(Turkey) Orduspor	Loan: €0.35M
2011-08-24	(Romania) Bogdan Stancu	(Turkey) Galatasaray	(Turkey) Orduspor	Loan: €0.35M
2011-06-08	(Turkey) Sercan Kaya	(Turkey) Bucaspor	(Turkey) Trabzonspor	€0.25M
2011-06-03	(Brazil) Sidnei	(Portugal) Benfica	(Turkey) Beşiktaş	Loan: €0.2M
2011-06-28	(Turkey) (Germany) Okan Derici	(Germany) Eintracht Frankfurt U23	(Turkey) Galatasaray	€0.15M
2011-09-05	(Turkey) Anıl Dilaver	(Turkey) Galatasaray	(Turkey) Samsunspor	Loan: €0.1M
2011-05-10	(Guinea) Ibrahim Yattara	(Turkey) Trabzonspor	(Saudi Arabia) Al-Shabab Riyadh	Free
2011-05-20	(Sweden) Johan Elmander	(England) Bolton Wandereres	(Turkey) Galatasaray	Free
2011-05-25	(Turkey) Egemen Korkmaz	(Turkey) Trabzonspor	(Turkey) Beşiktaş	Free
2011-05-25	(Turkey) Selçuk İnan	(Turkey) Trabzonspor	(Turkey) Galatasaray	Free
2011-05-25	(Croatia) Jerko Leko	(Turkey) Bucaspor	(Croatia) Dinamo Zagreb	Free
2011-05-25	(Turkey) Mustafa Keçeli	(Turkey) Bursaspor	(Turkey) Mersin İdmanyurdu	Free
2011-05-24	(Turkey) (Belgium) Engin Bekdemir	(Portugal) Porto	(Turkey) Kayserispor	N/A
2011-05-24	(Turkey) (Netherlands) Nadir Çiftçi	(England) Portsmouth	(Turkey) Kayserispor	Free
2011-05-23	(Argentina) Nicolás Navarro	(Argentina) Argentinos Juniors	(Turkey) Kayserispor	Free
2011-05-25	(Turkey) (Germany) Deniz Vural	(Germany) Eintracht Frankfurt U23	(Turkey) Eskişehirspor	Free
2011-05-27	(Turkey) Ali Kuçik	(Turkey) Beşiktaş	(Turkey) Gençlerbirliği	Free
2011-05-27	(Guinea) Kamil Zayatte	(Turkey) Konyaspor	(Turkey) İstanbul Büyükşehir Belediyespor	N/A
2011-05-27	(Canada) (Austria) Michael Klukowski	(Turkey) Ankaragücü	(Turkey) Manisaspor	N/A
2011-05-29	(Turkey) Mehmet Sedef	(Turkey) Konyaspor	(Turkey) Gençlerbirliği	Free
2011-05-29	(Turkey) İlhan Eker	(Turkey) Fenerbahçe	(Turkey) Kayserispor	Free
2011-05-30	(Bulgaria) Veselin Minev	(Bulgaria) Levski Sofia	(Turkey) Antalyaspor	N/A
2011-05-31	(Turkey) Cem Sultan	(Turkey) Galatasaray	(Turkey) Kayserispor	N/A
2011-05-31	(Senegal) (France) Jacques Faty	(France) Sochaux	(Turkey) Sivasspor	Free
2011-05-31	(Ghana) Jerry Akaminko	(Turkey) Orduspor	(Turkey) Manisaspor	Free
2011-06-01	(Turkey) Gökhan Ünal	(Turkey) Fenerbahçe	(Turkey) Kayserispor	Free
2011-06-02	(Turkey) Ali Tandoğan	(Turkey) Bursaspor	(Turkey) Antalyaspor	Free
2011-06-02	(Turkey) Doğa Kaya	(Turkey) Eskişehirspor	(Turkey) Antalyaspor	Free
2011-06-02	(France) Yannick Kamanan	(Turkey) Sivasspor	(Turkey) Mersin İdmanyurdu	Free
2011-06-02	(Canada) (Croatia) Milan Borjan	(Serbia) FK Rad	(Turkey) Sivasspor	N/A
2011-06-02	(Turkey) Nihat Şahin	(Turkey) Ofspor	(Turkey) Sivasspor	N/A
2011-06-02	(Argentina) Christian Rodrigo Zurita	(Turkey) Gaziantepspor	(Turkey) Mersin İdmanyurdu	Free
2011-06-03	(Turkey) Musa Aydın	(Turkey) Bucaspor	(Turkey) Antalyaspor	Free
2011-06-03	(Turkey) Erhan Güven	(Turkey) Beşiktaş	(Turkey) Mersin İdmanyurdu	Free
2011-06-03	(Turkey) Sinan Kaloğlu	(Netherlands) Vitesse Arnhem	(Turkey) Karabükspor	Free
2011-06-03	(Turkey) (Germany) Volkan Dikmen	(Germany) Hertha BSC	(Turkey) Karabükspor	Free
2011-06-05	(Portugal) Manuel Fernandes	(Spain) Valencia	(Turkey) Beşiktaş	Loan
2011-06-05	(Turkey) Mehmet Eren Boyraz	(Turkey) Kayserispor	(Turkey) Antalyaspor	Free
2011-06-07	(Turkey) Cafercan Aksu	(Turkey) Konya Torku Şekerspor	(Turkey) Gençlerbirliği	Free
2011-06-07	(Slovenia) Sašo Fornezzi	(Austria) Wiener Neustadt	(Turkey) Orduspor	Free
2011-06-08	(Turkey) Hakan Arıkan	(Turkey) Beşiktaş	(Turkey) Mersin İdmanyurdu	Free
2011-06-08	(Turkey) Eren Albayrak	(Turkey) Bursaspor	(Turkey) Trabzonspor	Free
2011-06-08	(Turkey) Orkun Uşak	(Turkey) Konyaspor	(Turkey) Karabükspor	Free
2011-06-08	(Tunisia) Wissem Ben Yahia	(Tunisia) Club Africain	(Turkey) Mersin İdmanyurdu	N/A
2011-06-08	(Guinea) Souleymane Youla	(Turkey) Denizlispor	(Turkey) Orduspor	N/A
2011-06-09	(Turkey) (Germany) Barış Özbek	(Turkey) Galatasaray	(Turkey) Trabzonspor	Free
2011-06-11	(Brazil) (Turkey) Mert Nobre	(Turkey) Beşiktaş	(Turkey) Mersin İdman Yurdu	Free
2011-06-11	(Turkey) (Germany) Ceyhun Gülselam	(Turkey) Trabzonspor	(Turkey) Galatasaray	Free
2011-06-13	(Turkey) Abdulaziz Solmaz	(Turkey) Samsunspor	(Turkey) Eskişehirspor	N/A
2011-06-13	(Turkey) Sakıb Aytaç	(Turkey) Çanakkale Dardanelspor	(Turkey) Gençlerbirliği	N/A
2011-06-13	(Turkey) Ferhat Kaplan	(Turkey) Çanakkale Dardanelspor	(Turkey) Gençlerbirliği	N/A
2011-06-13	(Turkey) Özgür İleri	(Turkey) Çanakkale Dardanelspor	(Turkey) Gençlerbirliği	N/A
2011-06-14	(Turkey) (Germany) Cemal Kaldırım	(Germany) SG Bad Breisig	(Turkey) Bursaspor	N/A
2011-06-14	(Turkey) Bedrican Özdoğan	(Turkey) Adıyamanspor	(Turkey) Bursaspor	N/A
2011-06-15	(Turkey) Bekir Ozan Has	(Turkey) Bursaspor	(Turkey) Gaziantepspor	Free
2011-06-15	(Georgia (country)) Zurab Khizanishvili	(England) Blackburn Rovers	(Turkey) Kayserispor	Free
2011-06-18	(Turkey) (Germany) Tarık Çamdal	(Germany) 1860 München	(Turkey) Eskişehirspor	N/A
2011-06-18	(Turkey) Abdülkadir Kayalı	(Turkey) Fenerbahçe	(Turkey) Eskişehirspor	Free
2011-06-23	(Turkey) Halil Altıntop	(Germany) Eintracht Frankfurt	(Turkey) Trabzonspor	Free
2011-06-23	(Slovakia) Stanislav Šesták	(Germany) VfL Bochum	(Turkey) MKE Ankaragücü	N/A
2011-07-06	(Albania) Lorik Cana	(Turkey) Galatasaray	(Italy) Lazio	Free
2011-08-12	(Turkey) Mehmet Batdal	(Turkey) Galatasaray	(Turkey) Karabükspor	Loan
2011-08-16	(Brazil) Bobô	(Turkey) Beşiktaş	(Brazil) Cruzeiro	Free
2011-09-01	(Turkey) Mustafa Sarp	(Turkey) Galatasaray	(Turkey) Samsunspor	Free
2011-09-01	(Germany) Michael Fink	(Turkey) Beşiktaş	(Turkey) Samsunspor	Loan
2011-09-01	(Turkey) Ergün Teber	(Turkey) Kasımpaşa	(Turkey) Samsunspor	Free
2011-09-05	(Turkey) Musa Çağıran	(Turkey) Galatasaray	(Turkey) Bursaspor	Free
2011-09-05	(Nigeria) Joseph Yobo	(England) Everton	(Turkey) Fenerbahçe	Loan
