= Konuk =

Konuk is a surname. Notable people with the surname include:

- İsmail Konuk (born 1988), Turkish footballer
- Kağan Timurcin Konuk (born 1990), Turkish footballer
- Nejat Konuk (1928–2014), Cypriot politician
