= Altuntaş =

Altuntaş is a Turkish surname. It may refer to:

- Baybars Altuntaş (born 1969), Turkish entrepreneur angel investor and angel investor
- Bircan Altuntaş (born 2001), Turkish female judoka
- Tarık Altuntaş (born 1991), Turkish footballer
- Yusuf Altuntaş (born 1961), Turkish footballer and coach

== See also ==
- Altuntash
