= Altuntash =

Altuntash may refer to:

- Altuntash (khwarazmshah), 11th century
- Altuntash (governor of Bosra), 12th century

== See also ==
- Altuntaş
