= Ibrahim Šehić =

Bosnian footballer (born 1988)

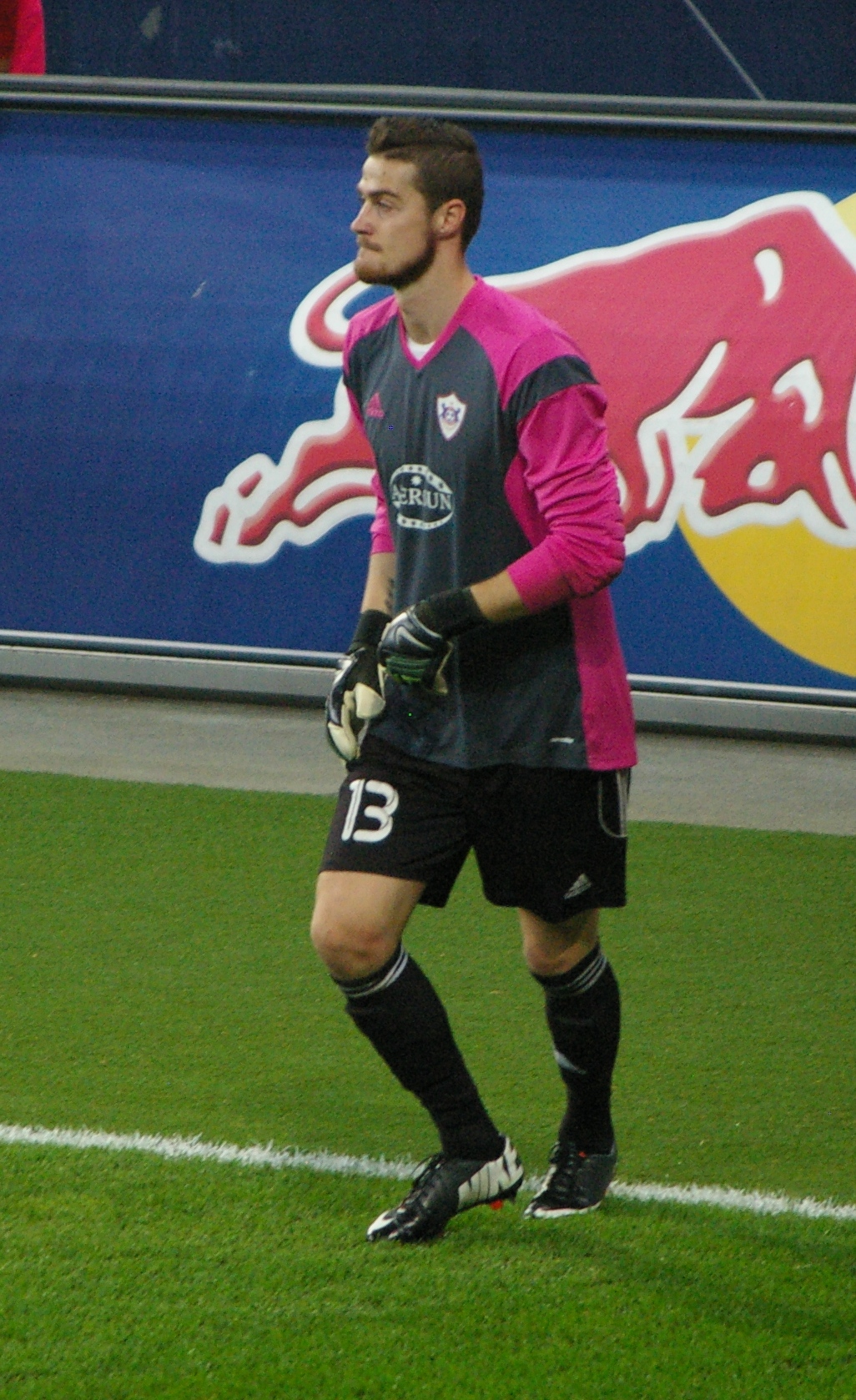
- Šehić with Qarabağ in 2014

Personal information
- Date of birth: 2 September 1988 (age 38)
- Place of birth: Rogatica, SR Bosnia and Herzegovina, SFR Yugoslavia
- Height: 1.90 m (6 ft 3 in)
- Position: Goalkeeper

Team information
- Current team: Sarıyer
- Number: 13

Youth career
- 1998–2007: Željezničar

Senior career*
Years	Team	Apps	(Gls)
2007–2011	Željezničar	108	(0)
2011–2013	Mersin Talim Yurdu	36	(0)
2013–2018	Qarabağ	120	(0)
2018–2020	Erzurumspor	66	(0)
2020–2023	Konyaspor	95	(0)
2023–2025	Al-Khaleej	51	(0)
2025–2026	Çorum	30	(0)
2026–	Sarıyer	13	(0)

International career
2008–2010	Bosnia and Herzegovina U21	11	(0)
2010–2024	Bosnia and Herzegovina	55	(0)
- * Club domestic league appearances and goals as of 6 November 2026

Ibrahim Šehić (pronounced [ibrâːxim ʃêːxitɕ]; born 2 September 1988) is a Bosnian professional footballer who plays as a goalkeeper for 1. Lig club Sarıyer.

Šehić started his professional career at Željezničar, before joining Mersin Talim Yurdu in 2011. Two years later, he moved to Qarabağ. In 2018, he signed with Erzurumspor. Šehić switched to Konyaspor in 2020. Three years later, he was transferred to Al-Khaleej. He joined Çorum in 2025. The following year, he moved to Sarıyer.

A former youth international for Bosnia and Herzegovina, Šehić made his senior international debut in 2010, earning over 50 caps until 2024.

== Club career ==
=== Early career ===
Šehić came through Željezničar's youth academy. He made his professional debut against Orašje on 26 May 2007 at the age of 18.

In June 2011, he joined Turkish club Mersin Talim Yurdu.

=== Qarabağ ===
In October 2013, Šehić was transferred to Azerbaijani side Qarabağ for an undisclosed fee. On 24 November, he made his official debut for the team in a goalless draw against Ravan Baku. He won his first trophy with the club on 7 May 2014, when they were crowned league champions.

In December, he extended his contract with the squad until June 2018.

He played his 100th game for the team against Gabala on 19 December 2015.

Šehić helped Qarabağ make their first historical UEFA Champions League appearance in the 2017–18 season. On 12 September 2017, he debuted in the competition away at Chelsea, and stood out during the group stage, as he was the goalkeeper with the most saves, having made 35 in six games.

=== Erzurumspor ===
In July 2018, Šehić moved to Erzurumspor on a three-year deal. He made his competitive debut for the side against Rizespor on 24 August and kept a clean sheet.

Šehić was an important piece in Erzurumspor's promotion to the Süper Lig just one season after being relegated. He did not concede a goal in 16 matches and captained the club.

=== Konyaspor ===
In August 2020, Šehić switched to Konyaspor on a two-year contract. He debuted officially for the squad on 19 September against Gençlerbirliği and managed to prevent them from scoring.

In November, he was named team captain.

Šehić signed a new two-year deal with Konyaspor in November 2021.

In February 2023, he prolonged his contract with the club until June 2025.

=== Later stage of career ===
In July, Šehić was transferred to Saudi Arabian outfit Al-Khaleej.

In July 2025, he signed with Çorum.

In July 2026, he switched to Sarıyer.

== International career ==
Šehić was a member of the Bosnia and Herzegovina under-21 team for several years.

In May 2010, he received his first senior call up, for friendly games against Sweden and Germany, but had to wait until 17 November to make his debut against Slovakia.

He retired from international football on 7 May 2024.

== Personal life ==
Šehić married his long-time girlfriend Merjem in January 2020. Together they have a daughter named Esma.

He is a practising Muslim; together with international teammates Muhamed Bešić, Armin Hodžić, Izet Hajrović, Sead Kolašinac, Edin Višća and Ervin Zukanović he visited a mosque in Zenica during the national team's concentration.

== Career statistics ==
=== Club ===
As of match played 6 November 2026

Appearances and goals by club, season and competition
Club	Season	League			National cup (Note: Includes Bosnian Cup, Turkish Cup, Azerbaijan Cup, King's Cup)		Continental		Other		Total	
Club	Season	Division	Apps	Goals	Apps	Goals	Apps	Goals	Apps	Goals	Apps	Goals
Željezničar	2006–07	Bosnian Premier League	1	0	0	0	–		–		1	0
Željezničar	2007–08	Bosnian Premier League	20	0	6	0	–		–		26	0
Željezničar	2008–09	Bosnian Premier League	29	0	1	0	–		–		30	0
Željezničar	2009–10	Bosnian Premier League	29	0	8	0	–		–		37	0
Željezničar	2010–11	Bosnian Premier League	29	0	8	0	2 (Note: Appearances in UEFA Champions League)	0	–		39	0
Željezničar	Total		108	0	23	0	2	0	–		133	0
Mersin Talim Yurdu	2011–12	Süper Lig	22	0	0	0	–		–		22	0
Mersin Talim Yurdu	2012–13	Süper Lig	14	0	2	0	–		–		16	0
Mersin Talim Yurdu	Total		36	0	2	0	–		–		38	0
Qarabağ	2013–14	Azerbaijan Premier League	22	0	3	0	–		–		25	0
Qarabağ	2014–15	Azerbaijan Premier League	29	0	3	0	12 (Note: Four appearances in UEFA Champions League; eight appearances in UEFA Europa League)	0	–		44	0
Qarabağ	2015–16	Azerbaijan Premier League	32	0	3	0	12 (Note: Four appearances in UEFA Champions League; eight appearances in UEFA Europa League)	0	–		47	0
Qarabağ	2016–17	Azerbaijan Premier League	19	0	2	0	12 (Note: Four appearances in UEFA Champions League; eight appearances in UEFA Europa League)	0	–		33	0
Qarabağ	2017–18	Azerbaijan Premier League	18	0	2	0	11	0	–		31	0
Qarabağ	Total		120	0	13	0	47	0	–		180	0
Erzurumspor	2018–19	Süper Lig	32	0	0	0	–		–		32	0
Erzurumspor	2019–20	1. Lig	34	0	0	0	–		–		34	0
Erzurumspor	Total		66	0	0	0	–		–		66	0
Konyaspor	2020–21	Süper Lig	29	0	0	0	–		–		29	0
Konyaspor	2021–22	Süper Lig	37	0	0	0	–		–		37	0
Konyaspor	2022–23	Süper Lig	29	0	0	0	4 (Note: Appearances in UEFA Conference League)	0	–		33	0
Konyaspor	Total		95	0	0	0	4	0	–		99	0
Al-Khaleej	2023–24	Saudi Pro League	27	0	2	0	–		–		29	0
Al-Khaleej	2024–25	Saudi Pro League	24	0	1	0	–		–		25	0
Al-Khaleej	Total		51	0	3	0	–		–		54	0
Çorum	2025–26	1. Lig	30	0	0	0	–		4 (Note: Appearances in 1. Lig promotion play-offs)	0	34	0
Sarıyer	2026–27	1. Lig	13	0	0	0	–		–		13	0
Career total			519	0	41	0	53	0	4	0	617	0

=== International ===
Appearances and goals by national team and year
National team	Year	Apps	Goals
Bosnia and Herzegovina
Bosnia and Herzegovina	2010	2	0
Bosnia and Herzegovina	2011	1	0
Bosnia and Herzegovina	2012	0	0
Bosnia and Herzegovina	2013	0	0
Bosnia and Herzegovina	2014	0	0
Bosnia and Herzegovina	2015	0	0
Bosnia and Herzegovina	2016	3	0
Bosnia and Herzegovina	2017	0	0
Bosnia and Herzegovina	2018	12	0
Bosnia and Herzegovina	2019	9	0
Bosnia and Herzegovina	2020	5	0
Bosnia and Herzegovina	2021	8	0
Bosnia and Herzegovina	2022	6	0
Bosnia and Herzegovina	2023	8	0
Bosnia and Herzegovina	2024	1	0
Total		55	0

== Honours ==
Željezničar

- Bosnian Premier League: 2009–10
- Bosnian Cup: 2010–11

Qarabağ

- Azerbaijan Premier League: 2013–14, 2014–15, 2015–16, 2016–17, 2017–18
- Azerbaijan Cup: 2014–15, 2015–16, 2016–17
