= İbrahim Ferdi Coşkun =

Turkish footballer (born 1987)

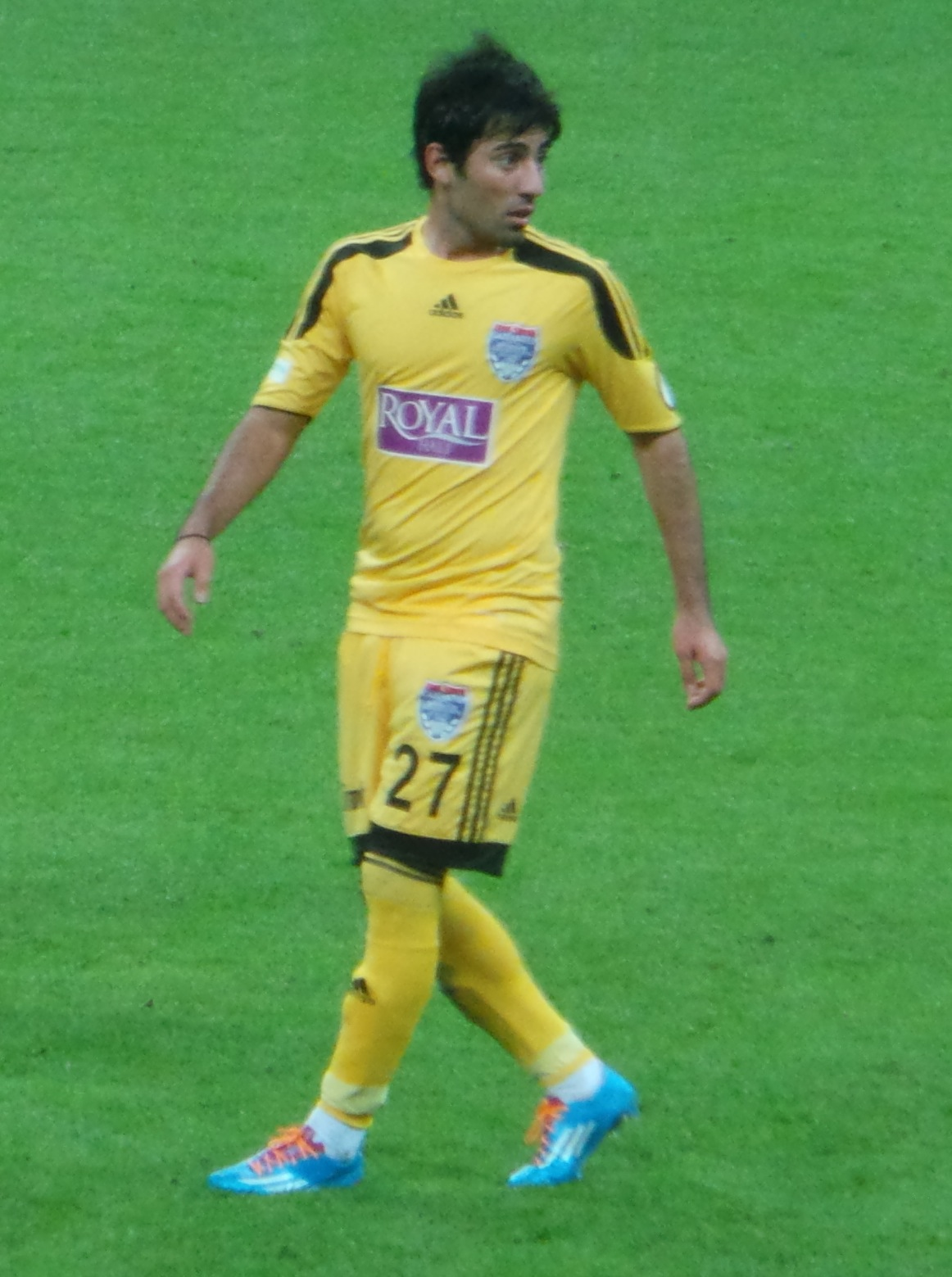

Personal information
- Full name: İbrahim Ferdi Coşkun
- Date of birth: April 20, 1987 (age 39)
- Place of birth: Gaziantep, Turkey
- Height: 1.74 m (5 ft 9 in)
- Position: Left winger

Team information
- Current team: Gaziantep Ankasspor

Youth career
- 1999–2005: Gaziantepspor

Senior career*
Years	Team	Apps	(Gls)
2005–2013	Gaziantepspor	34	(3)
2006–2008	→ Gaskispor (loan)	51	(9)
2011	→ Gaziantep BB (loan)	13	(1)
2011–2012	→ Mersin İdman Yurdu (loan)	5	(0)
2013	Gölbaşıspor	20	(0)
2013–2015	Gaziantep BB	22	(0)
2015–2016	Diyarbakır BB	40	(7)
2016–2018	Altay	31	(3)
2018	Niğde Anadolu	6	(0)
2019–2020	Tarsus İdman Yurdu	1	(0)
2020–	Gaziantep Ankasspor	0	(0)
- * Club domestic league appearances and goals as of 17:19, 18 January 2020 (UTC)

İbrahim Ferdi Coşkun (born 20 April 1987) is a Turkish professional footballer who plays as a left winger for Gaziantep Ankasspor.

== Career ==
Coşkun began his career with local club Gaziantepspor. He was loaned out to Gaskispor for two seasons from 2006 to 2008. In July 2011, he moved to Mersin İdman Yurdu after a long stint as a Gaziantepspor player.
