= İbrahim Kaş =

Turkish footballer

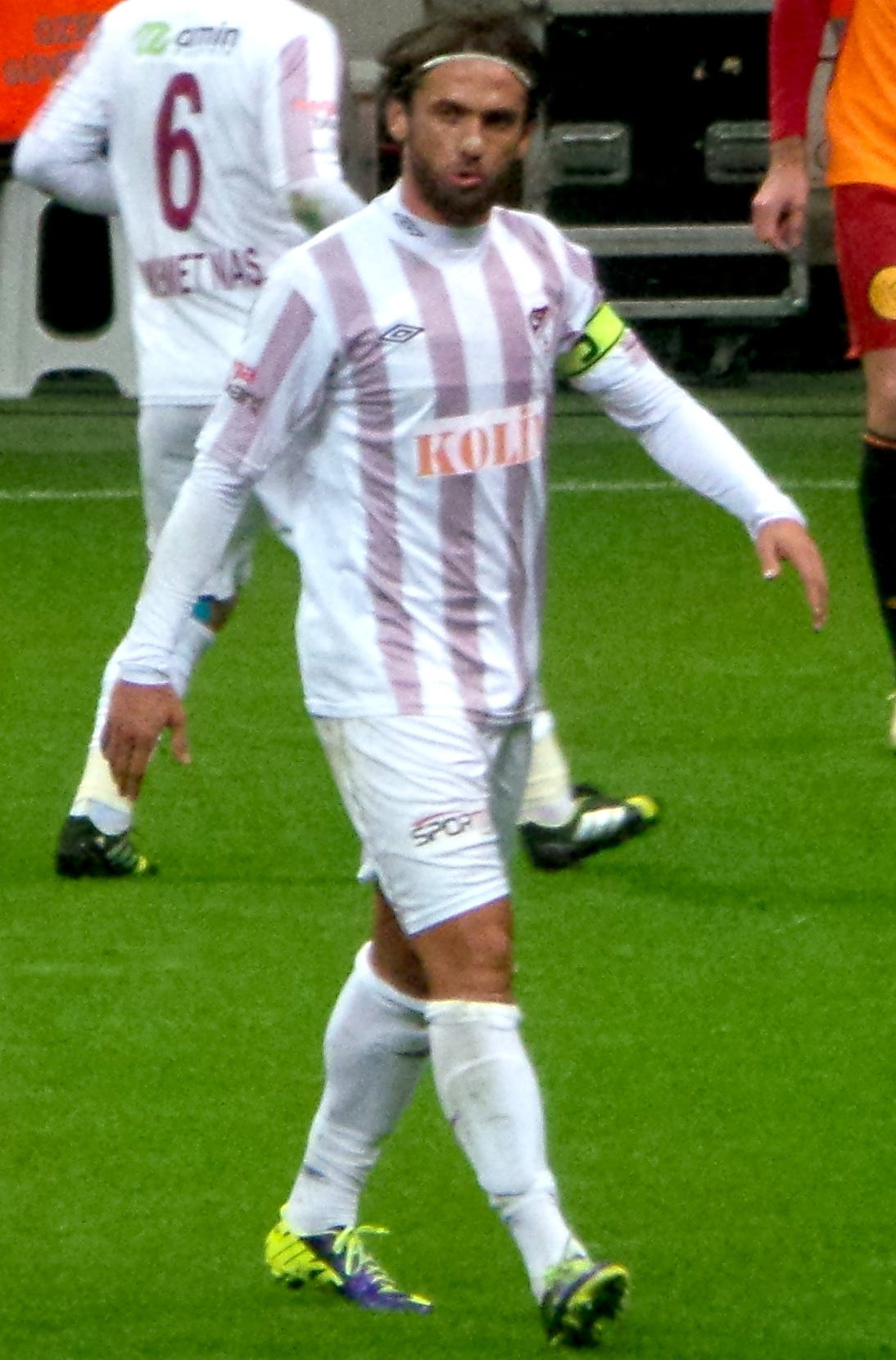
- Kaş in action for Elazığspor in 2013

Personal information
- Date of birth: 20 September 1986 (age 40)
- Place of birth: Karabük, Turkey
- Height: 1.83 m (6 ft 0 in)
- Position: Defender

Youth career
- 2000–2001: Beşbin Evlerspor
- 2001–2002: Karabükspor
- 2002–2004: Beşiktaş

Senior career*
Years	Team	Apps	(Gls)
2004–2008	Beşiktaş	17	(3)
2005–2006	→ Kocaelispor (loan)	26	(3)
2008–2011	Getafe	8	(0)
2009–2010	→ Beşiktaş (loan)	14	(0)
2011–2013	Bursaspor	0	(0)
2011–2012	→ Mersin İdmanyurdu (loan)	23	(0)
2012–2013	→ Orduspor (loan)	15	(0)
2013–2014	Elazığspor	11	(0)
2014–2015	Gaziantep BB	12	(0)
2016	Karşıyaka	12	(0)
2017	Kastamonuspor	8	(0)
2017–2018	Silivrispor	13	(0)
2018–2019	Eyüpspor	0	(0)
2019	GMG Kastamonuspor	0	(0)

International career
2007–2009	Turkey	7	(0)
- * Club domestic league appearances and goals as of 23 September 2022

İbrahim Kaş (born 20 September 1986) is a Turkish footballer who plays as a central defender or right back.

== Club career ==
Born in Karabük, Kaş started his professional career with Beşiktaş J.K. in the Süper Lig at the age of 18, signing a four-year deal. He was sent on loan for the 2005–06 season to Kocaelispor, in the second division.

Kaş returned to his alma mater the following summer, and made almost 30 appearances in his remaining two seasons there. He managed to score two goals against Manisaspor in the final game of the 2007–08 campaign, a 5–1 win.

Shortly before the 2008 summer, Kaş agreed terms with Spanish club Getafe CF, joining for 2008–09 on a Bosman transfer. He made his La Liga debut against Athletic Bilbao in a 1–0 win, on 29 September 2008.

However, during his first year, Kaş only made a handful of appearances for Getafe, being subsequently loaned to former team Beşiktaş in August 2009, in a season-long move. In the 2011 January transfer window he again returned to his country and signed for Bursaspor, playing his first official game in the season's UEFA Europa League against FC Gomel.

== International career ==
Kaş received his first call-up to the Turkey national team in a UEFA Euro 2008 qualifier away to Norway, on 17 November 2007. However, he had to leave the game early on, due to injury, as the national side eventually won it 2–1 and qualified for the final stages, for which he was not picked.

== Honours ==
=== Club ===
Beşiktaş

- Turkish Cup: 2006–07
