= Mount Davraz =

Mountain in Turkey

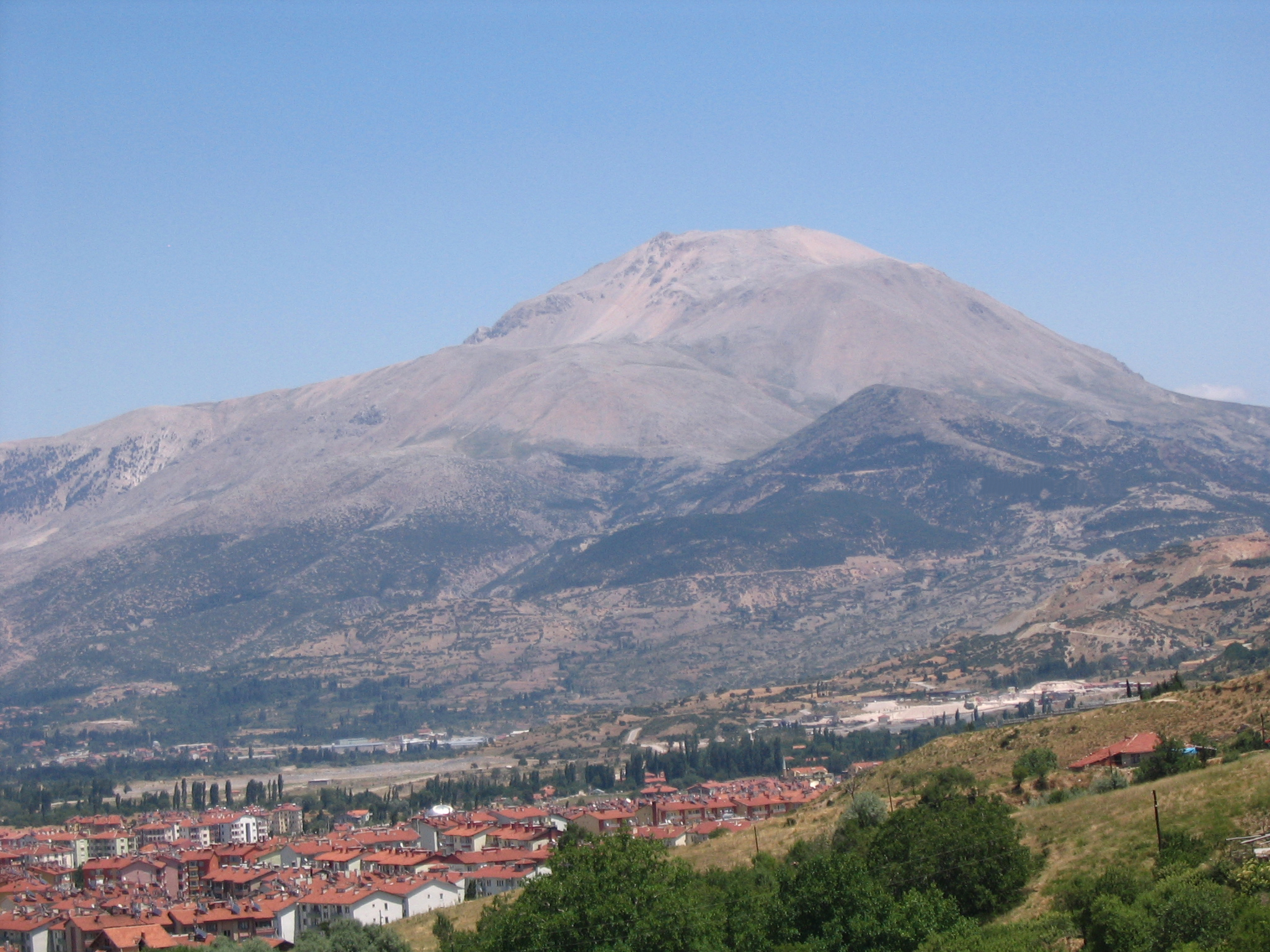
- A view of Mount Davraz

Highest point
- Elevation: 2,637 m (8,652 ft)
- Coordinates: 37°47′4.4″N 30°45′48.4″E

Geography
- Location within Turkey
- Location: Isparta Province, Turkey

Mount Davraz (Turkish: Davraz Dağı), also sometimes cited as Mount Davras, is a mountain and a winter sports and ski resort in the Taurus Mountains in Isparta Province in southern Turkey. The nearest cities are the province seat of Isparta and its depending district of Eğirdir, both of which are at a roughly equal distance of 25 km (16 mi) from the Davraz Ski Resort (Turkish: Isparta Davraz Kayak Merkezi). Antalya is 140 km (87 mi) away and, served by road connections.

The tallest peak (Büyük Davraz) at the resort is 2,637 m (8,652 ft) with the highest skiing height being at 2,250 m (7,380 ft). There are black, red, blue and yellow runs. Access to the slopes is via drag and chair lifts - depending on the particular run. The resort is open from December 1 each year, although the main period of winter sports varies with the snow conditions.

Davraz is served by one main hotel, Sirene Davras Ski and Wellness Hotel. The hotel is located at 1,650 m (5,410 ft).

== Gallery ==
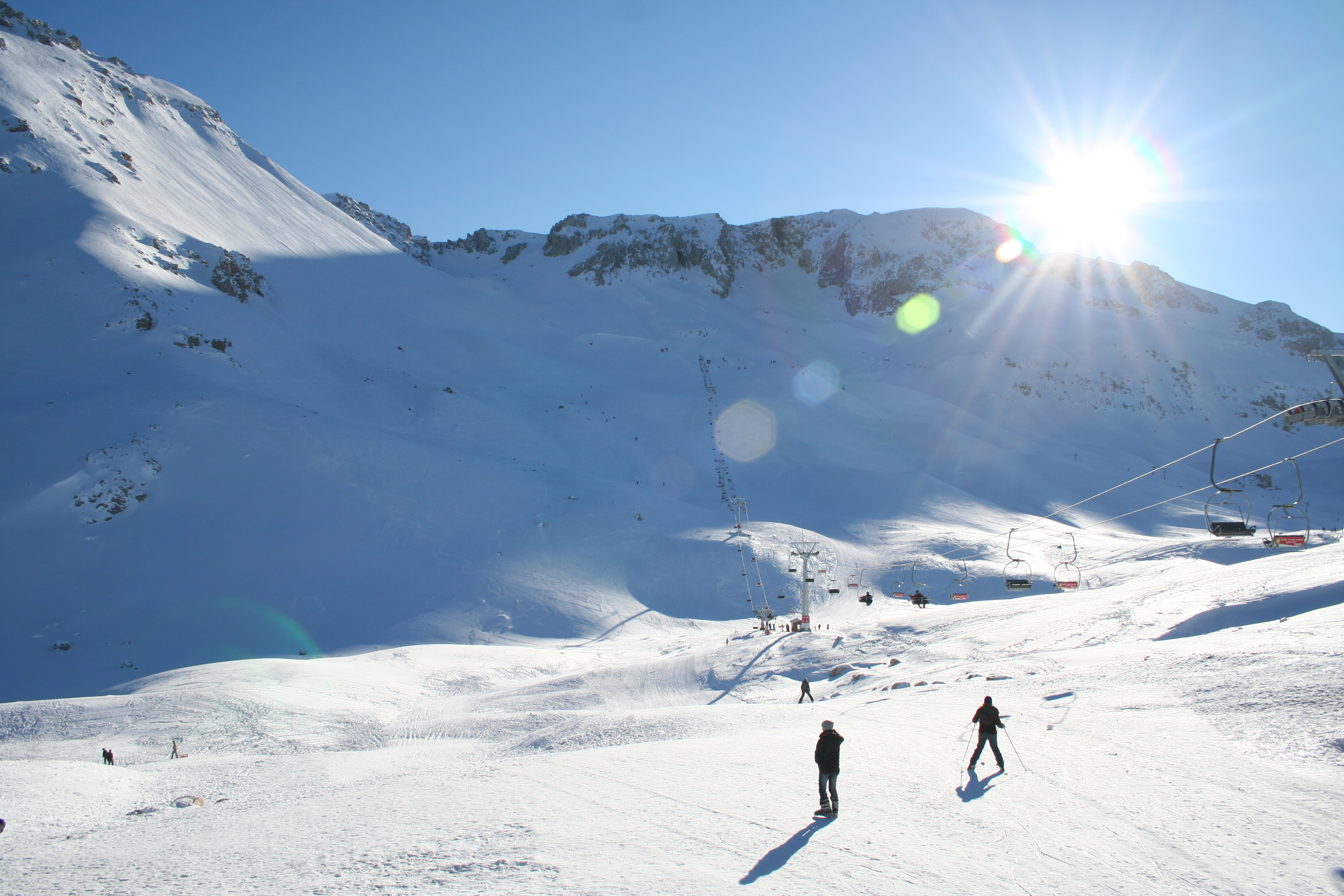

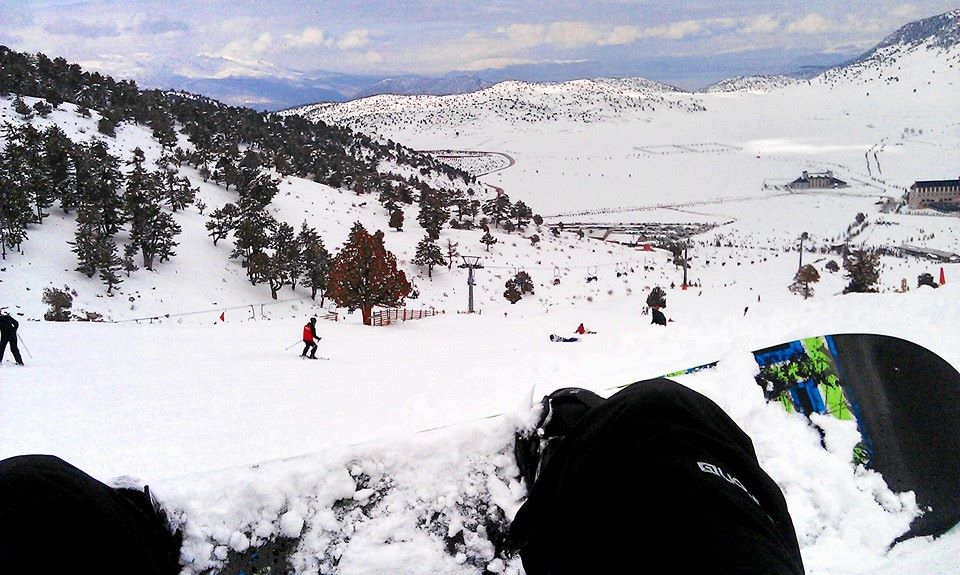
