= Metin Depe =

Turkish footballer (born 1981)

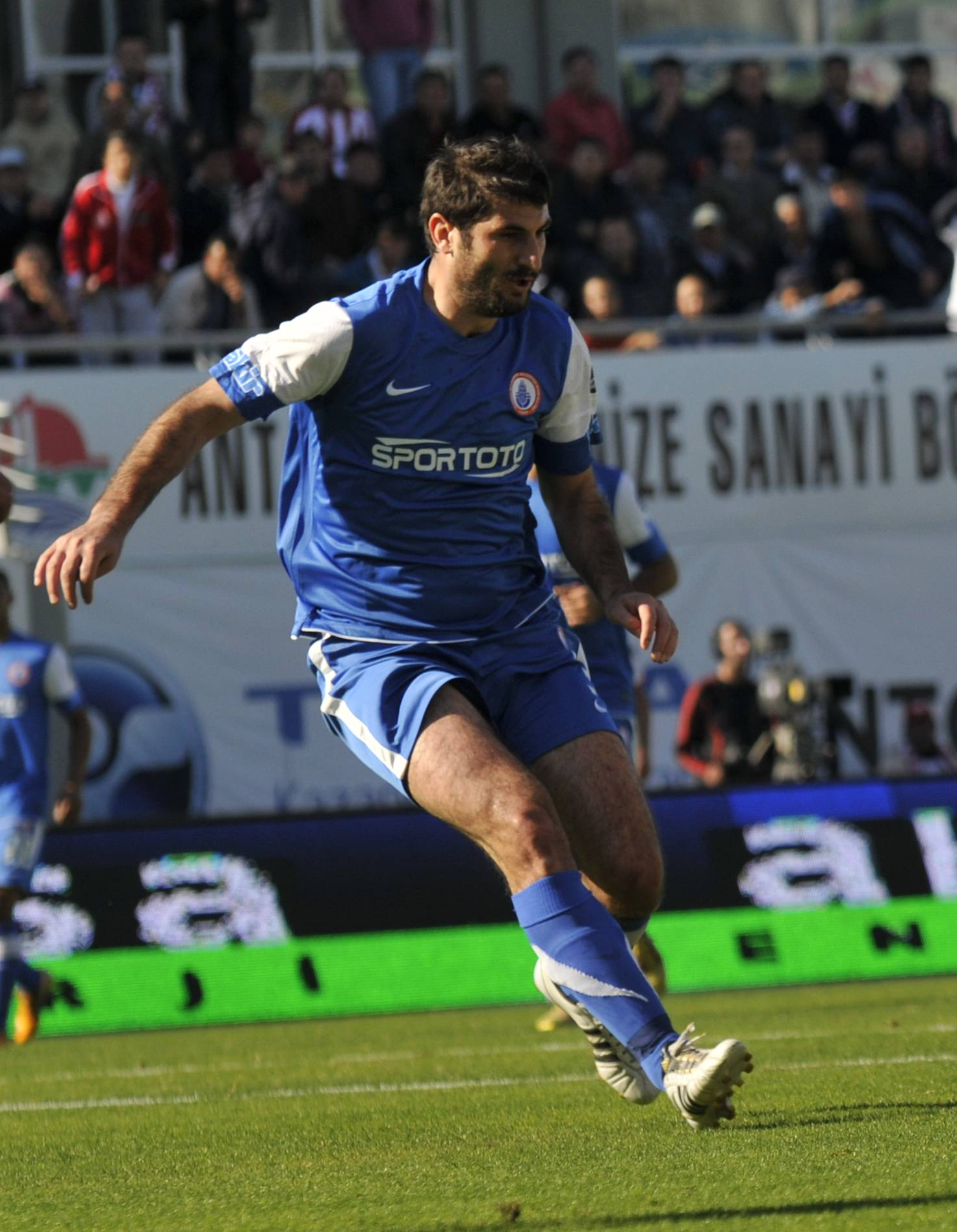

Personal information
- Full name: Metin Depe
- Date of birth: November 10, 1981 (age 45)
- Place of birth: Samsun, Turkey
- Height: 1.85 m (6 ft 1 in)
- Position: Defender

Senior career*
Years	Team	Apps	(Gls)
2003–2004	Bursaspor	2	(0)
2004–2007	Altay	57	(9)
2007–2013	Istanbul BB	106	(6)
2013	Boluspor		
2014–2015	Göztepe		
- * Club domestic league appearances and goals as of 17 May 2010

Metin Depe (born November 10, 1981, in Samsun) is a former Turkish football defender.
