= Kağan Timurcin Konuk =

Turkish footballer

Konuk
Personal information
- Full name: Kağan Timurcin Konuk
- Date of birth: 1 October 1990 (age 36)
- Place of birth: Malatya
- Height: 1.77 m (5 ft 9 1/2 in)
- Position: Midfielder

Team information
- Current team: Şanlıurfaspor

Senior career*
Years	Team	Apps	(Gls)
2010–2012	Sivasspor	12	
2012–	Şanlıurfaspor	25	
- * Club domestic league appearances and goals

Kağan Timurcin Konuk (born 1 October 1990) is a Turkish professional footballer who plays for Şanlıurfaspor.
