= Nicolás Navarro (Argentine footballer) =

Argentine footballer (born 1985)

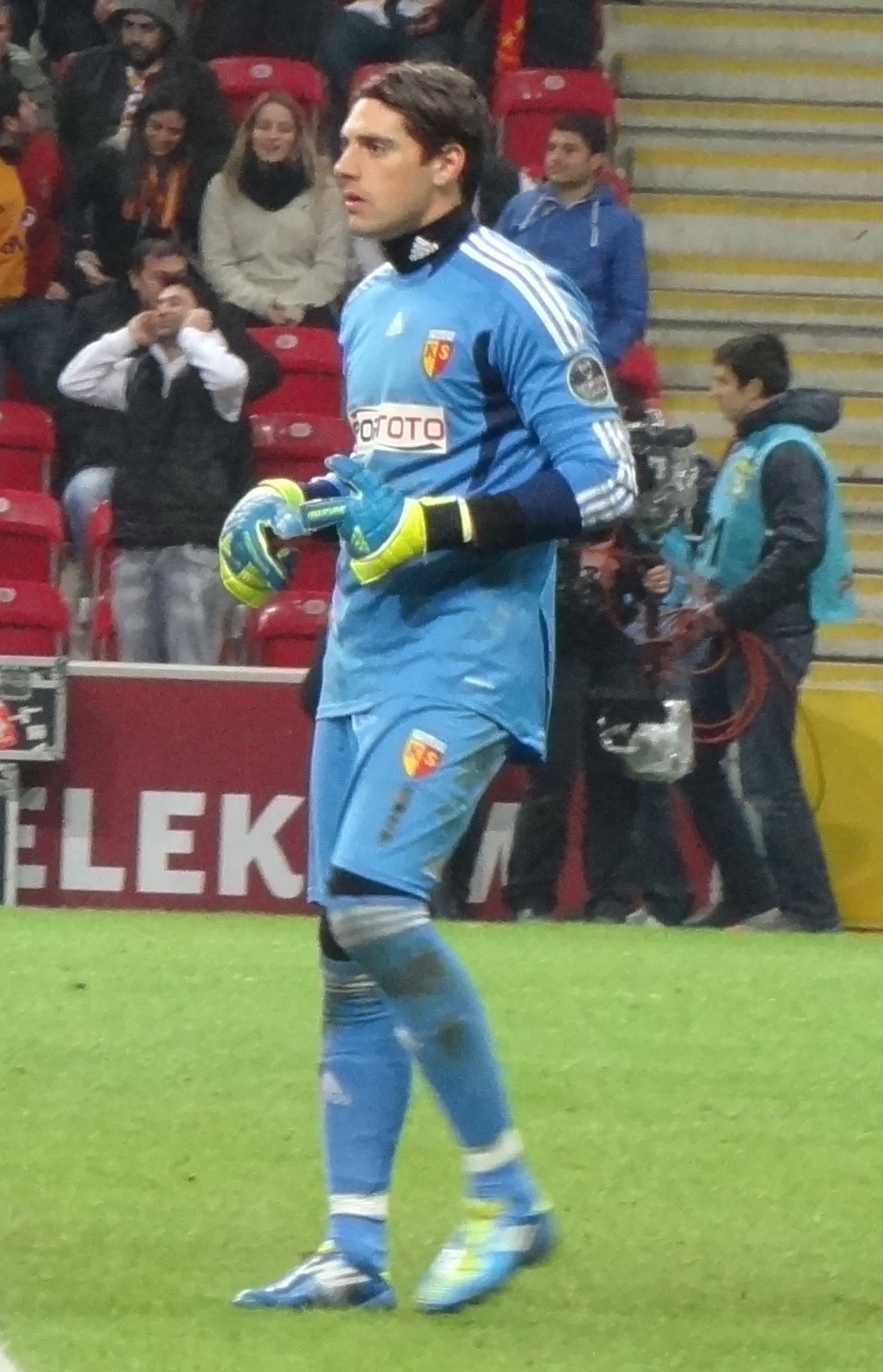
- Navarro with Kayserispor

Personal information
- Full name: Nicolás Gastón Navarro
- Date of birth: 25 March 1985 (age 41)
- Place of birth: Buenos Aires, Argentina
- Height: 1.90 m (6 ft 3 in)
- Position: Goalkeeper

Youth career
- Argentinos Juniors

Senior career*
Years	Team	Apps	(Gls)
2004–2007	Argentinos Juniors	22	(0)
2008–2010	Napoli	22	(0)
2009–2010	→ River Plate (loan)	4	(0)
2010–2011	Argentinos Juniors	23	(0)
2011–2013	Kayserispor	29	(0)
2013–2015	Tigre	2	(0)
2015–2016	Gimnasia LP	8	(0)
2016–2020	San Lorenzo	59	(0)
2019	→ Querétaro (loan)	7	(0)
2020	Tigre	0	(0)
2021	Arsenal de Sarandí	8	(0)

International career
2005	Argentina U20	3	(0)
2008	Argentina Olympic	0	(0)
Medal record
Representing Argentina
Men's Football
Gold medal – first place	2008 Beijing	Team competition
- * Club domestic league appearances and goals

Nicolás Gastón Navarro (born 25 March 1985) is an Argentine former professional footballer who played as a goalkeeper.

== Club career ==
Navarro started his career with Argentinos Juniors in 2004. In 2007, he was sold to Serie A side SSC Napoli for a fee of around $5 million, the biggest amount received by the Argentine club since Diego Maradona's transfer in 1981 (around 10 million of the same coin).

On 20 August 2009, Navarro joined River Plate on loan from Napoli. However, he played only 4 games in River. For the 2010–11 Argentine Primera División season, Navarro returned to Argentinos Juniors (defending champions of the Argentine league).

== International career ==
Navarro was part of the Argentina Under-20 squad that won the 2005 FIFA World Youth Championship title. He also won a gold medal at the 2008 Summer Olympics. He was not part of the original squad, but received the call-up to replace injured goalkeeper Oscar Ustari during the tournament.

== Honours ==
Argentina U20

- FIFA U-20 World Cup: 2005

Argentina Olympic

- Olympic Gold Medal: 2008
