= Mustafa Keçeli =

Turkish footballer

Personal information
- Date of birth: 15 September 1978 (age 48)
- Place of birth: Ankara, Turkey
- Height: 1.76 m (5 ft 9 1/2 in)
- Position: Wingback

Youth career
- Petrolofisi

Senior career*
Years	Team	Apps	(Gls)
1997–1999	Petrolofisi	43	(3)
1999–2001	Ankaraspor	82	(4)
2001–2006	Denizlispor	102	(3)
2006–2008	Trabzonspor	49	(3)
2008–2011	Bursaspor	69	(0)
2011–2013	Mersin İdmanyurdu	49	(1)
2013–2014	Bugsaşspor	17	(0)
2014–2016	Denizlispor	65	(1)
- * Club domestic league appearances and goals

Mustafa Keçeli (born 15 April 1978) is a retired Turkish footballer.

Keçeli wears the number 23 jersey and his position is leftwinger. He played for Petrolofisi (1997–1999), Ankaraspor (1999–2001), Denizlispor (2001–2006) and Trabzonspor (2006–2008) before joining to Bursaspor in June 2008.

== Honours ==
- Bursaspor
  - Süper Lig (1): 2009–10
