= Tarık Altuntaş =

Turkish footballer

Personal information
- Full name: Tarık Altuntaş
- Date of birth: 23 August 1991 (age 35)
- Place of birth: Bor, Turkey
- Position: Midfielder

Youth career
- 2006–2009: Karacailyas Belediye
- 2009–2011: Mersin İdman Yurdu

Senior career*
Years	Team	Apps	(Gls)
2011–2013	Mersin İdman Yurdu	1	(0)
2013–2014	Balçova Belediyespor	3	(0)
2014–2015	Toroslar Belediyespor	12	(0)
- * Club domestic league appearances and goals

Tarık Altuntaş (born 23 August 1991) is a Turkish footballer who plays as a midfielder.

He made his Süper Lig debut on 7 April 2012.
