= Erhan Güven =

Turkish footballer

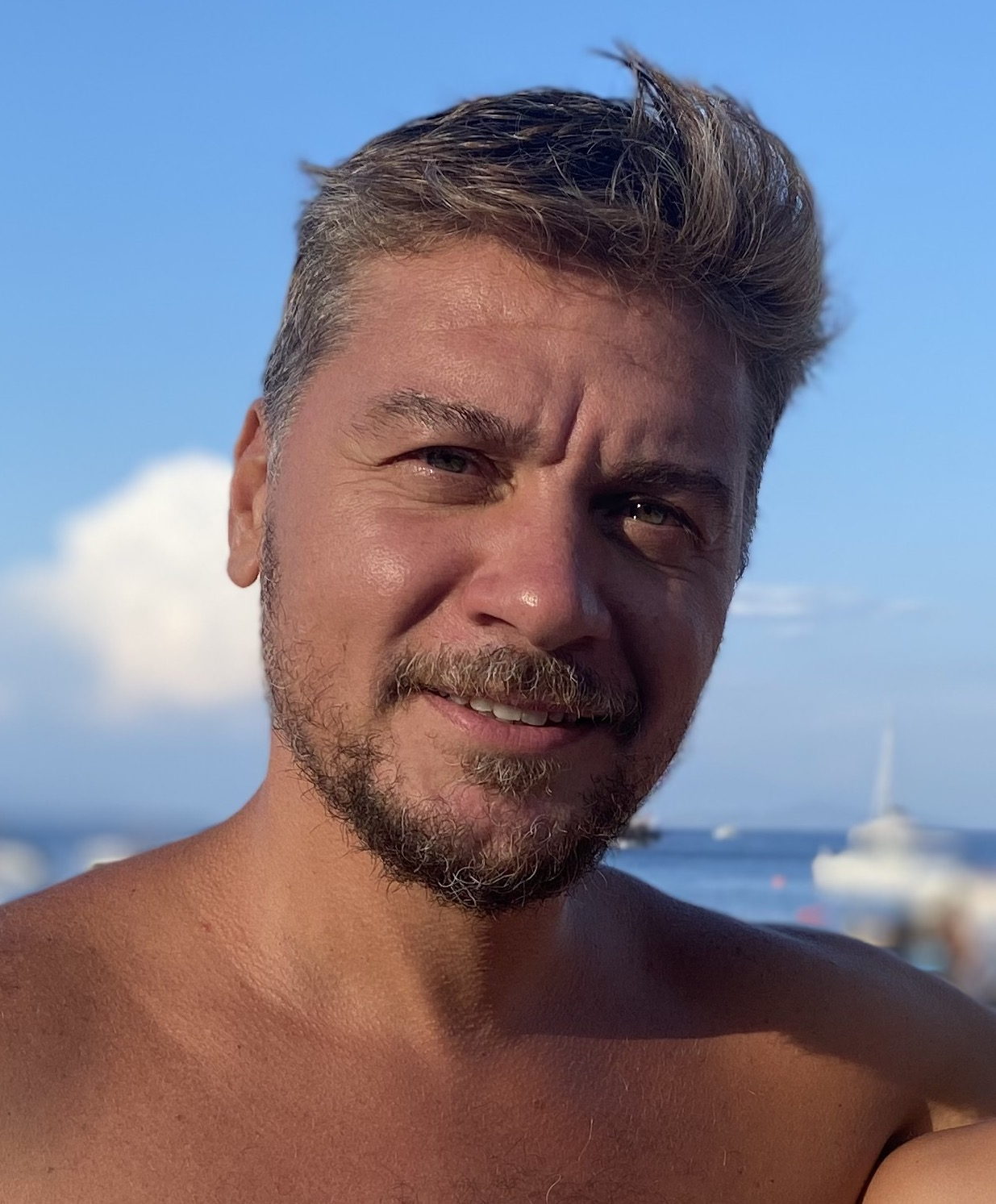
- 2022

Personal information
- Date of birth: 15 May 1982 (age 44)
- Place of birth: Ankara, Turkey
- Height: 1.83 m (6 ft 0 in)
- Position: Defender

Youth career
- 1996–1999: Saran Keskinspor
- 1999–2000: MKE Kırıkkalespor
- 2000–2001: Gençlerbirliği

Senior career*
Years	Team	Apps	(Gls)
2001–2005	Hacettepespor	–	(-)
2003–2004	→ Kayseri Erciyesspor (loan)	6	(0)
2005	→ Gençlerbirliği (loan)	7	(1)
2005–2008	Gençlerbirliği	72	(2)
2008–2009	Ankaraspor	33	(0)
2009–2011	Beşiktaş	18	(0)
2009	→ Antalyaspor (loan)	14	(0)
2011–2012	Mersin İdman Yurdu	28	(1)
2012–2013	Sivasspor	24	(0)
2013–2014	Kayseri Erciyesspor	6	(0)
2014	Ankaragücü	9	(0)
- * Club domestic league appearances and goals

Erhan Güven (born 15 May 1982) is a Turkish former football defender.

== Honours ==
Beşiktaş JK

- Turkish Cup : 2010-11
