= Hakan Arıkan =

Turkish footballer

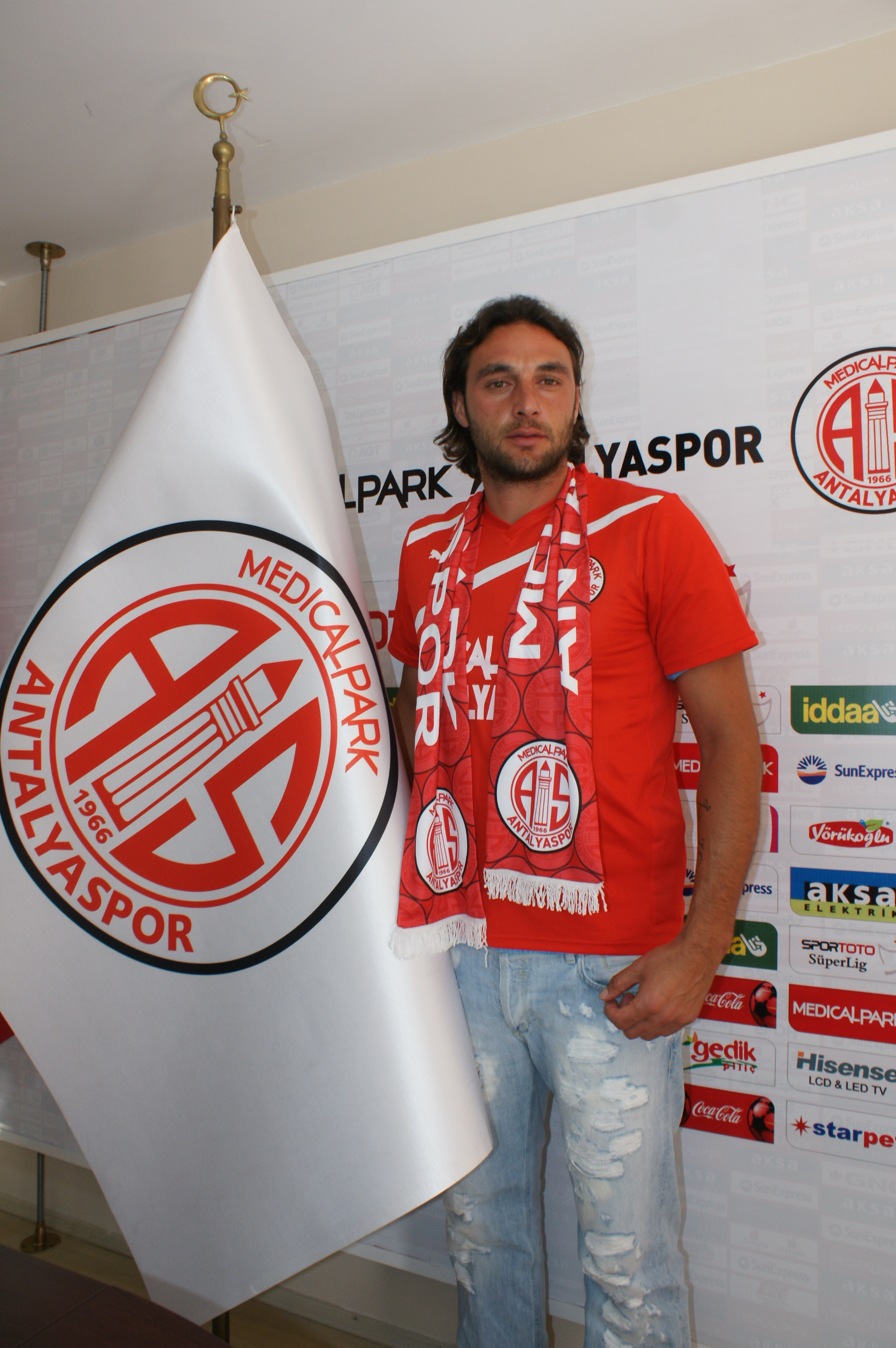

Personal information
- Date of birth: 17 August 1982 (age 44)
- Place of birth: Karamürsel, Kocaeli, Turkey
- Height: 1.96 m (6 ft 5 in)
- Position: Goalkeeper

Youth career
- 1999–2001: Petkimspor
- 2001–2002: Kocaelispor

Senior career*
Years	Team	Apps	(Gls)
2002–2006	Kocaelispor	87	(0)
2006–2007	Ankaraspor	32	(0)
2007–2011	Beşiktaş	34	(0)
2011–2012	Mersin İdman Yurdu	11	(0)
2012–2014	Antalyaspor	38	(0)
2014–2015	Kayserispor	24	(0)
2015	→ Trabzonspor (loan)	17	(0)
2016–2018	Osmanlıspor	16	(0)
2018–2019	Gençlerbirliği	21	(0)
2019–2020	Kayserispor	0	(0)

International career
2007–2011	Turkey	4	(0)
- * Club domestic league appearances and goals

Hakan Arıkan (born 17 August 1982) is a Turkish former footballer who played as a goalkeeper.

== Club career ==
=== Raising to fame ===
Arıkan had begun his career at Petkimspor, an amateur team based in western Turkish city of İzmit. He then joined Kocaelispor in 2001. During his time with Kocaeli, he played both for senior and youth teams for almost three seasons until he began to play regularly as the number one keeper.

Arıkan joined Ankaraspor in 2006. He was called up to the Turkey national team, for his first time, during a friendly game, after he had shown an impressive performance for Ankaraspor, by saving two penalties in a 1–1 draw against Galatasaray on the very first match day in 2006/07 Season. Arıkan finished that season off with conceding 27 goals in 26 matches.

=== Beşiktaş era ===
He joined Beşiktaş in exchange with keeper Ramazan Kurşunlu plus 0.7 million Euros. He has played alternately with Rüştü Reçber in 2007/08 Season.After a couple of years of being Rüştü Reçber's under study he finally became a regular for his team in the 2010-11 season along with Cenk Gönen making important saves several times including a back to back save in the same second against Rapid Wien.

== International career ==
Arıkan was initially called up for the national team before the match against Georgia in February 2007. He made his debut on 5 June 2007 against Brazil, in a game dedicated to Tugay Kerimoğlu's last cap for national team. He could not find a place in Euro 2008 selection.
