= Christian Zurita (footballer) =

Argentine footballer

Personal information
- Full name: Christian Rodrigo Zurita
- Date of birth: 24 July 1979 (age 47)
- Place of birth: Salta, Argentina
- Height: 1.85 m (6 ft 1 in)
- Position: Midfielder

Senior career*
Years	Team	Apps	(Gls)
1997–1999	Gimnasia y Tiro	53	(5)
1999–2003	San Lorenzo	53	(1)
2003–2005	Independiente	52	(2)
2005–2006	Colón	35	(1)
2006–2011	Gaziantepspor	138	(4)
2011–2012	Mersin İdman Yurdu	16	(0)
- * Club domestic league appearances and goals as of 22 May 2010

Christian Rodrigo Zurita (born July 24, 1979, in Salta) is an Argentine football midfielder. He currently plays as captain for Mersin İdman Yurdu of the Spor Toto Super League in Turkey.

Zurita started his career at his local club Gimnasia y Tiro de Salta in the Primera Division Argentina in 1997, at the end of the 1997–1998 season the club were relegated to the Argentine 2nd division and Zurita decided to stay with the club.

When Gimnasia y Tiro failed to secure promotion back to the primera, Zurita moved to San Lorenzo, the club with which he has had the most success to date.

In 2003 Zurita was sold to Club Atlético Independiente and 2 seasons later he joined Colón de Santa Fe and during the summer of 2006 Zurita joined Gaziantepspor in Turkey and in 2009 he became the team captain.

== Titles ==
Season	Club	Titles
Clausura 2001	San Lorenzo	Primera Division Argentina
2002	San Lorenzo	Copa Sudamericana
