= List of foreign Süper Lig players =

This is a list of foreign players that have played in the Süper Lig. The following players:

1. have played at least one Süper Lig game for the respective club.
2. have not been capped for the Turkey national team on any level.
3. have been born in Turkey and were capped by a foreign national team. This includes players who have dual citizenship with Turkey.

In bold: players that played at least one Süper Lig game in the current season, and the clubs they've played for.

== Albania ==
- Arlind Ajeti – Bodrum 2024–25
- Kristjan Asllani – Beşiktaş 2025–26
- Bekim Balaj – Gençlerbirliği 2010–11
- Erjon Bogdani – Gençlerbirliği 1998
- Alban Bushi – Adanaspor, İstanbulspor, Trabzonspor 1999–2005
- Lorik Cana – Galatasaray 2010–11
- Endri Cekici – MKE Ankaragücü, Konyaspor, Pendikspor 2020–24
- Sokol Cikalleshi – İstanbul Başakşehir, Akhisarspor, Osmanlıspor, Göztepe, Konyaspor 2015–19, 2020–25
- Debatik Curri – Gençlerbirliği 2010–13
- Klodian Duro – Samsunspor, Malatyaspor, Çaykur Rizespor 2002–04
- Sindrit Guri – İstanbulspor 2022–23
- Omar Imeri – Antalyaspor 2020–21
- Redi Jupi – Diyarbakırspor 2003–06
- Bekim Kuli – Gençlerbirliği, Samsunspor 1999–2003
- **Arda Okan Kurtulan** – Fenerbahçe, Adana Demirspor, **Göztepe** 2021–22, 2024–
- **Qazim Laçi** – **Çaykur Rizespor** 2025–
- Ermir Lenjani – Ümraniyespor 2022–23
- Gilman Lika – Hacettepe, Diyarbakırspor 2008–10
- Rey Manaj – Sivasspor 2023–25
- Agon Mehmeti – Gençlerbirliği 2016–17
- **Ernest Muçi** – Beşiktaş, **Trabzonspor** 2023–
- **Arbnor Muja** – **Samsunspor** 2023–
- Viktor Paço – Kocaelispor 2002–03
- **Ylber Ramadani** – **Çorum** 2026–
- Florjan Rızbaa – Adana Demirspor 1991–92
- Altin Rraklli – Diyarbakırspor 2002–03
- Eduard Rroca – İstanbulspor 2022–24
- Armando Sadiku – BB Erzurumspor 2020–21
- Taulant Seferi – Bodrum 2024–25
- Florent Shehu – Adana Demirspor 2023–25
- Vioresin Sinani – Kayserispor 2004–05
- Xhevahir Sukaj – Hacettepe 2008
- Admir Teli – Hacettepe 2008
- Indrit Tuci – Kayserispor 2025–26
- Frédéric Veseli – Fatih Karagümrük 2023–24

== Algeria ==
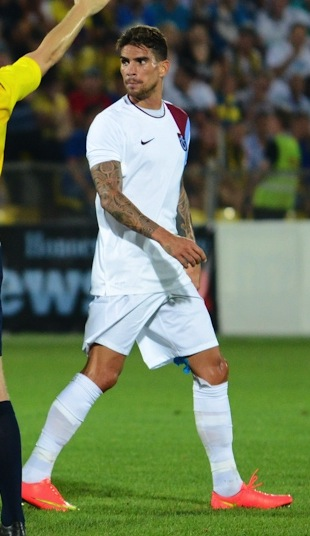
Carl Medjani

- Mehdi Abeid – İstanbul Başakşehir 2023–24
- Djamel Amani – Aydınspor 1990–93
- Youcef Atal – Adana Demirspor 2023–24
- Fayçal Badji – Erzurumspor 1998–99
- Khelifa Belaouchet – Aydınspor 1990–91
- Essaïd Belkalem – Trabzonspor 2014–15
- Yassine Benzia – Fenerbahçe, Hatayspor – 2018–19, 2021–22
- Ismaël Bouzid – Galatasaray, MKE Ankaragücü 2007–09
- Mohamed Dahmane – Bucaspor 2010–11
- Rachid Djebaili – Göztepe 2002–03
- Rafik Djebbour – Sivasspor 2013–14
- Tahar Cherif El Ouazani – Aydınspor 1990–92
- Sofiane Feghouli – Galatasaray, Fatih Karagümrük 2017–24
- Zinedine Ferhat – Alanyaspor 2022–23
- Houssam Ghacha – Antalyaspor 2021–23
- Rachid Ghezzal – Beşiktaş, Çaykur Rizespor 2020–25
- Nabil Ghilas – Gaziantepspor, Göztepe 2016–19
- Faouzi Ghoulam – Hatayspor 2023–24
- Jugurtha Hamroun – Karabükspor 2012–14
- Youssef Haraoui – Karabükspor, Bursaspor, Karşıyaka 1993–96
- Noureddine Negazzi – Aydınspor 1991–92
- Kamel Kadri – Aydınspor 1992–93
- Naoufel Khacef – Gaziantep 2023–24
- Tarek Lazizi – Gençlerbirliği 1998–99
- Khaled Lounici – Aydınspor 1992–93
- Raïs M'Bolhi – Antalyaspor 2015–17
- Carl Medjani – Trabzonspor, Sivasspor 2014–16
- Hamid Merakchi – Gençlerbirliği 1998–2000
- Islam Slimani – Fenerbahçe – 2018–19
- Ahmed Touba – İstanbul Başakşehir 2022–24
- Mehdi Zeffane – Yeni Malatyaspor 2021–22
- Karim Ziani – Kayserispor 2010–11

== Angola ==
- **Loide Augusto** – Alanyaspor, **Çaykur Rizespor** 2023–
- Isaac Boelua Lokuli – Antalyaspor 2002
- Gelson Dala – Antalyaspor 2019–20
- Djalma – Kasımpaşa, Konyaspor, Gençlerbirliği 2012–16
- Wilson Eduardo – Alanyaspor 2021–23
- Carlos Fernandes – Bucaspor 2010–11
- **Fredy** – Antalyaspor, Bodrum, **Çorum** 2018–25, 2026–
- Geraldo – MKE Ankaragücü, Ümraniyespor 2020–23
- Johnson Macaba – Malatyaspor 2002–04
- André Macanga – Gaziantepspor 2004–05
- **Maestro** – Adana Demirspor, **Alanyaspor** 2023–
- Manucho – Bucaspor, Manisaspor 2010–11
- Felício Milson – MKE Ankaragücü 2022–23
- Bruno Paz – Konyaspor 2022–24
- **Show** – **Kocaelispor** 2025–

== Argentina ==
- Juan Pablo Avendaño – Kayserispor 2007–08
- Jerónimo Barrales – Sivasspor 2015–16
- Pablo Batalla – Bursaspor 2009–13, 2016–18
- Fernando Belluschi – Bursaspor 2012–15
- Lucas Biglia – Fatih Karagümrük, İstanbul Başakşehir 2020–23
- Gustavo Blanco Leschuk – Antalyaspor 2019–20
- Guillermo Burdisso – Galatasaray 2014
- Gastón Campi – Trabzonspor, Fatih Karagümrük, Yeni Malatyaspor 2019–22
- Franco Cángele – Sakaryaspor, Kayserispor, Elazığspor 2006–14
- Héctor Canteros – MKE Ankaragücü 2018–20
- Alejandro Capurro – Sakaryaspor 2006–07
- Marcelo Carrusca – Galatasaray 2006–08
- Lucas Castro – Fatih Karagümrük, Adana Demirspor 2020–22
- Jorge Chaves – Vefa 1971–73
- Renato Civelli – Bursaspor 2013–15
- Gustavo Colman – Trabzonspor 2008–14
- Emmanuel Culio – Galatasaray, Orduspor, Mersin İdmanyurdu 2010–13
- Matías Defederico – Eskişehirspor 2015
- Matías Delgado – Beşiktaş 2006–10
- Emanuel Dening – Yeni Malatyaspor 2017–18
- Franco Di Santo – Göztepe 2021–22
- Matías Dituro – Fatih Karagümrük 2023–24
- Adrián Domenech – Gençlerbirliği 1989–90
- Matías Escobar – Kayserispor 2008
- Eber Darío Fernández – Göztepe 1999–2000
- Leo Franco – Galatasaray 2009–10
- Matías Fritzler – Kasımpaşa 2013–14
- Adolfo Gaich – Çaykur Rizespor, Antalyaspor 2023–25
- Lautaro Giannetti – Antalyaspor 2025–26
- Claudio Graf – Sakaryaspor 2007–08
- Cristian Guanca – Kasımpaşa 2017
- **Armando Güner** – **Galatasaray** 2025–
- Guido Herrera – Yeni Malatyaspor 2020–21
- Federico Higuaín – Beşiktaş 2007
- Luis Ibáñez – Trabzonspor, Karabükspor 2016–19
- Mauro Icardi – Galatasaray 2022–26
- Leonardo Andrés Iglesias – Kayserispor, MKE Ankaragücü, Bursaspor 2006–10
- Emiliano Insúa – Galatasaray 2010–11
- Federico Insúa – Bursaspor 2010–11
- Matías Kranevitter – Fatih Karagümrük 2025–26
- Vicente Monje – Orduspor 2012–13
- Jorge Montemarani – Vefa 1971–74
- Pablo Mouche – Kayserispor 2012–14
- Lucas Mugni – Gençlerbirliği 2020–21
- Osvaldo Nartallo – Beşiktaş, Petrol Ofisi 1993–95
- Nicolás Navarro – Kayserispor 2011–12
- Hugo Mario Noremberg – Gençlerbirliği 1990–91
- Leonel Núñez – Bursaspor 2010–11
- Lucas Ontivero – Galatasaray, Gaziantepspor 2014
- Ariel Ortega – Fenerbahçe 2002–03
- Nehuén Paz – Kayserispor 2020–21
- Diego Perotti – Fenerbahçe 2020–21
- Jorge Rinaldi – Gençlerbirliği 1989–90
- Ismael Sosa – Gaziantepspor 2010–12
- Ezequiel Scarione – Kasımpaşa 2013–16
- Damián Steinert – Bursaspor 2010–11
- José Sosa – Beşiktaş 2014–16
- Javier Umbides – Orduspor 2012–13
- Fede Varela – Denizlispor 2020–21
- Matías Vargas – Adana Demirspor 2021–22
- Valentín Viola – Karabükspor 2014–15
- Santiago Vergini – Bursaspor – 2018–19
- Lucas Villafáñez – Alanyaspor 2017–19
- Claudio Zacarias – Gençlerbirliği 1990–91
- Fernando Zuqui – Yeni Malatyaspor 2020–21
- Christian Zurita – Gaziantepspor, Mersin İdmanyurdu 2006–12

== Armenia ==
- Aras Özbiliz – Beşiktaş 2016–17

== Aruba ==
- Joshua John – Bursaspor 2016–19

== Australia ==
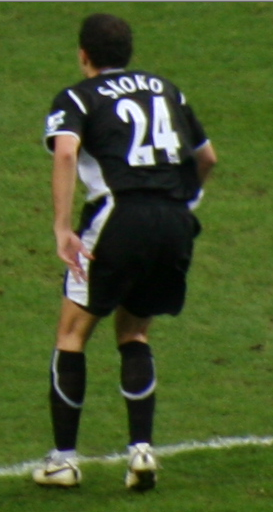
Josip Skoko

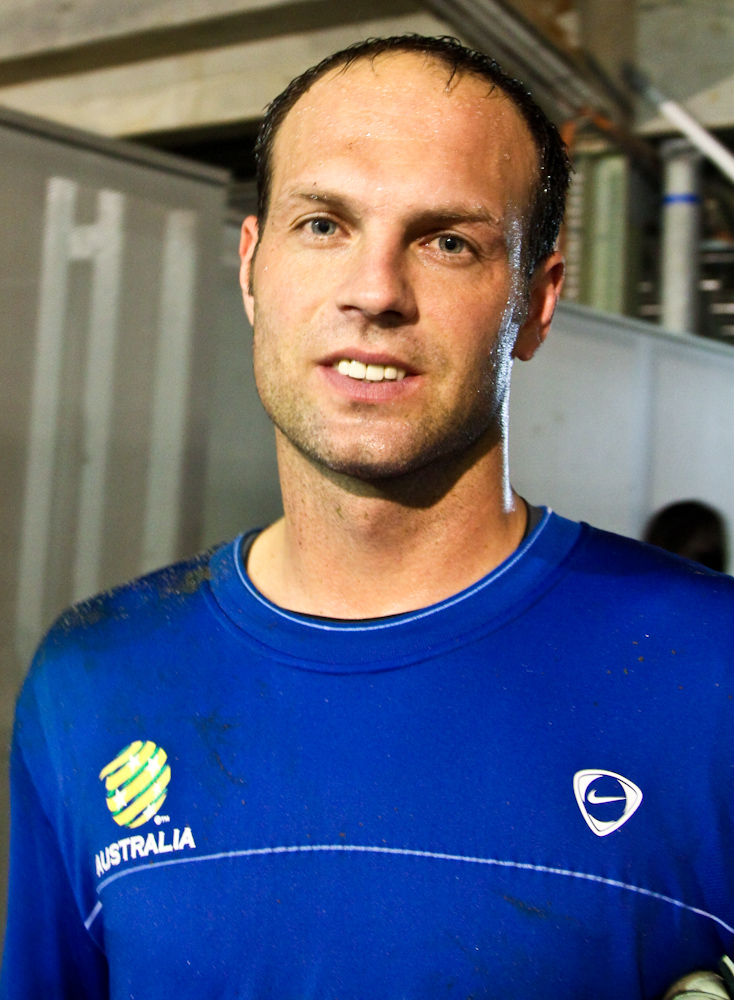
Michael Petkovic

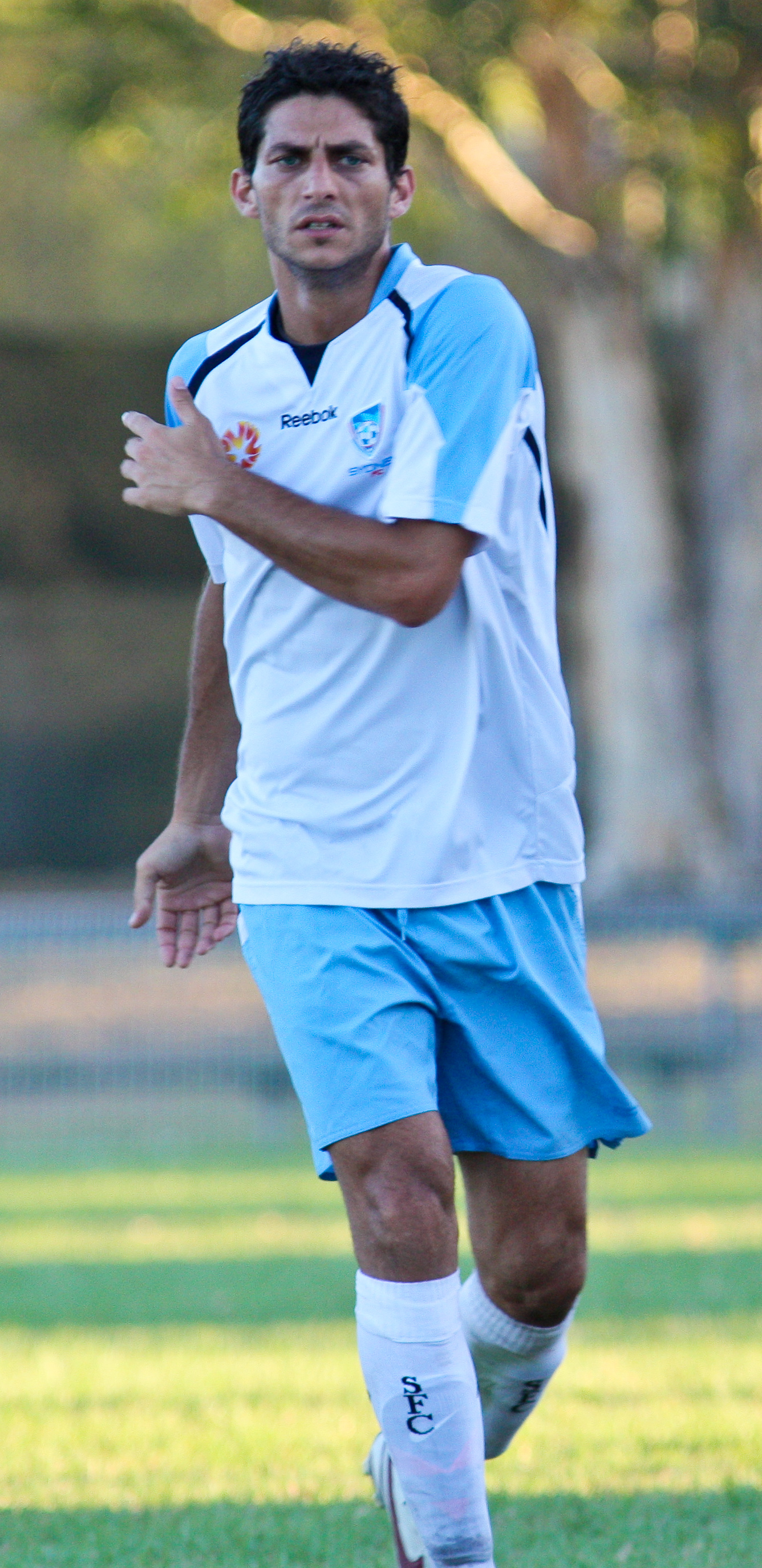
Simon Colosimo

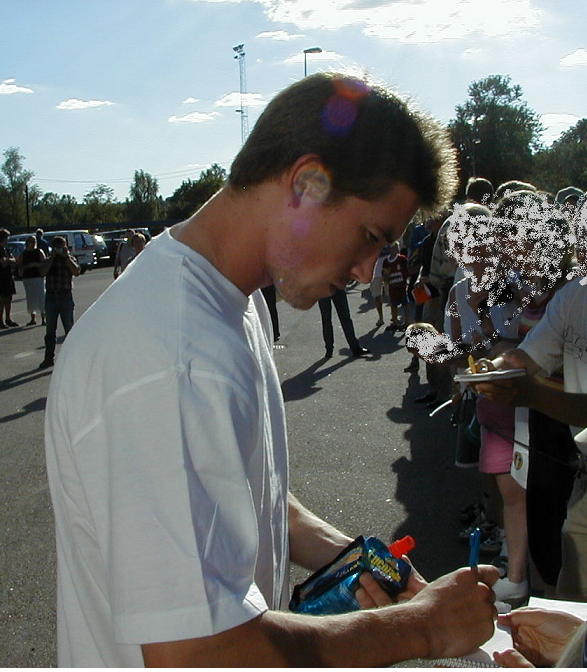
Harry Kewell

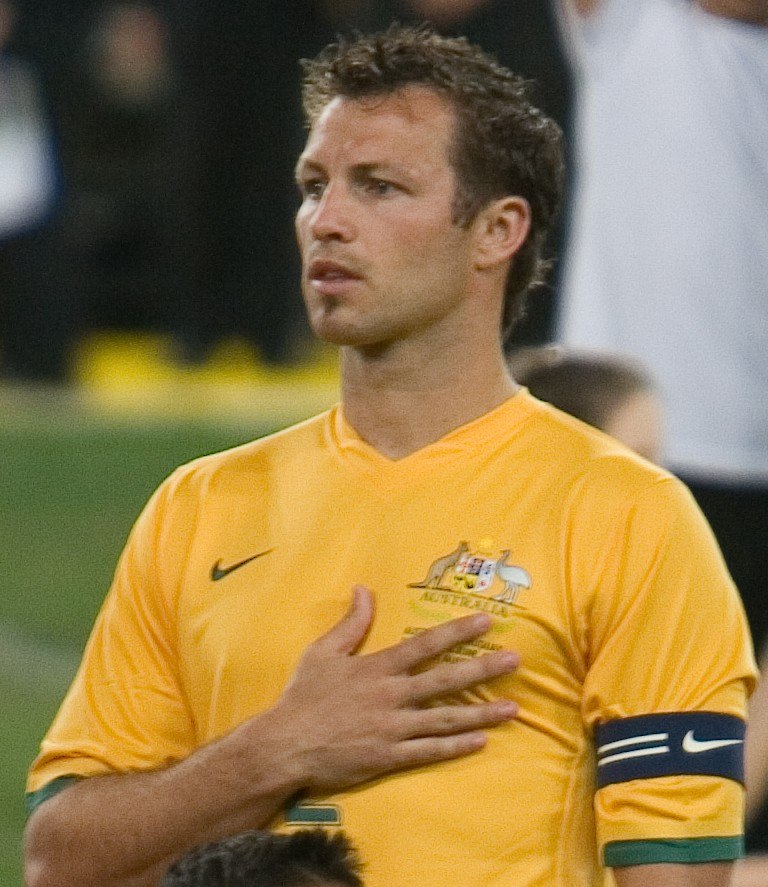
Lucas Neill

- Tansel Başer – Trabzonspor 1998–2000
- Aziz Behich – Bursaspor, İstanbul Başakşehir, Kayserispor, Giresunspor 2013–18, 2019–22
- Con Blatsis – Kocaelispor 2002–03
- Kerem Bulut – Akhisar Belediyespor 2013
- Nick Carle – Gençlerbirliği 2007
- Simon Colosimo – Sivasspor 2007
- Bruce Djite – Gençlerbirliği, Diyarbakırspor 2008–10
- Mile Jedinak – Gençlerbirliği, Antalyaspor, İstanbul Başakşehir 2008–11
- Harry Kewell – Galatasaray 2008–11
- Awer Mabil – Kasımpaşa 2021–22
- Lucas Neill – Galatasaray 2010–11
- Levent Osman – Trabzonspor 2002–03
- Michael Petkovic – Trabzonspor, Sivasspor 2002–10
- Jason Petkovic – Konyaspor 2004–05
- Josip Skoko – Gençlerbirliği 2003–05
- James Troisi – Gençlerbirliği, Kayserispor 2008–12

== Austria ==
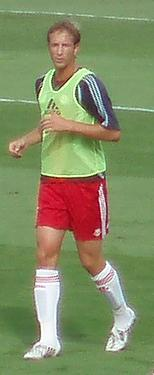
Marc Janko

- Bora Adam – Fatih Karagümrük 2020–21
- Onurhan Babuscu – Gaziantep 2022–23
- **Muhammed Cham** – **Trabzonspor** 2024–
- Ekrem Dağ – Gaziantepspor, Beşiktaş 2005–14
- Yusuf Demir – Galatasaray 2022–23, 2024–26
- Emir Dilaver – Çaykur Rizespor 2020–21
- Benjamin Fuchs – Konyaspor 2014–15
- Muhammed Ildiz – Gaziantepspor 2013–17
- Marc Janko – Trabzonspor 2012–14
- Jakob Jantscher – Çaykur Rizespor 2016–18
- Ercan Kara – Samsunspor 2023–25
- Veli Kavlak – Beşiktaş 2011–18
- Tanju Kayhan – Beşiktaş, Mersin İdmanyurdu, Eskişehirspor, Elazığspor, Karabükspor 2011–15
- **Can Keleş** – Fatih Karagümrük, Beşiktaş, Kasımpaşa, **Kocaelispor** 2023–
- Ümit Korkmaz – Çaykur Rizespor 2013–16
- Roland Linz – Gaziantepspor 2009–10
- Yasin Pehlivan – Gaziantepspor Bursaspor, Kayseri Erciyesspor 2011–12, 2013–15
- Christian Schandl – Gençlerbirliği 1999–2001
- Srđan Spiridonović – Gençlerbirliği 2020–21
- **Cem Üstündag** – Kasımpaşa, **Amedspor** 2025–
- Peter Zulj – Göztepe, İstanbul Başakşehir 2020–22

== Azerbaijan ==
- **Nariman Akhundzade** – **Erzurumspor** 2026–
- Murat Akpınar – Trabzonspor, Giresunspor 2018–19, 2021–23
- Ufuk Budak – Kayserispor 2016–17
- Renat Dadashov – Hatayspor 2023–24
- Mahir Emreli – Konyaspor 2022–23
- Ali Gökdemir – Elazığspor 2014
- Ilgar Gurbanov – Sivasspor 2007–08
- Ramal Huseynov – Kocaelispor 2008–09
- Samet Karakoç – Antalyaspor 2025–26
- Vyacheslav Lychkin – Trabzonspor 1996–97
- Shakhruddin Magomedaliyev – Adana Demirspor 2023–24
- Cihan Özkara – Sivasspor 2011–12, 2013–14
- Ernani Pereira – Konyaspor, Orduspor, Mersin İdmanyurdu 2003–05, 2007, 2010–11
- Vidadi Rzayev – Erzurumspor 2000
- Mahir Şükürov – Antalyaspor 2004
- Rashad Sadygov – Kayserispor 2005–06, Kocaelispor 2009, Eskişehirspor 2010–11
- Umut Sönmez – Kayserispor 2016–17
- Ramil Sheydayev – Trabzonspor 2016–17
- **Ilter Tashkin** – **Eyüpspor** 2024–
- Deniz Yılmaz – Elazığspor, Trabzonspor, Bursaspor, Gençlerbirliği 2013–18

== Bahrain ==
- Jaycee Okwunwanne – Eskişehirspor 2009–11

== Belarus ==
- Alexander Hleb – Konyaspor 2014–15, Gençlerbirliği 2015–2016
- Syarhey Kislyak – Gaziantepspor 2016–17
- Sergey Politevich – Gençlerbirliği 2016–18
- Anton Putsila – Gaziantepspor 2015–17
- Artem Radkov – Gençlerbirliği 2014
- Mikalay Ryndzyuk – Gaziantepspor 2001–02
- Maksim Romaschenko – Gaziantepspor, Trabzonspor, Bursaspor 2000–04, 2007–09
- Erik Yakhimovich – Gaziantepspor 2000–02

== Belgium ==
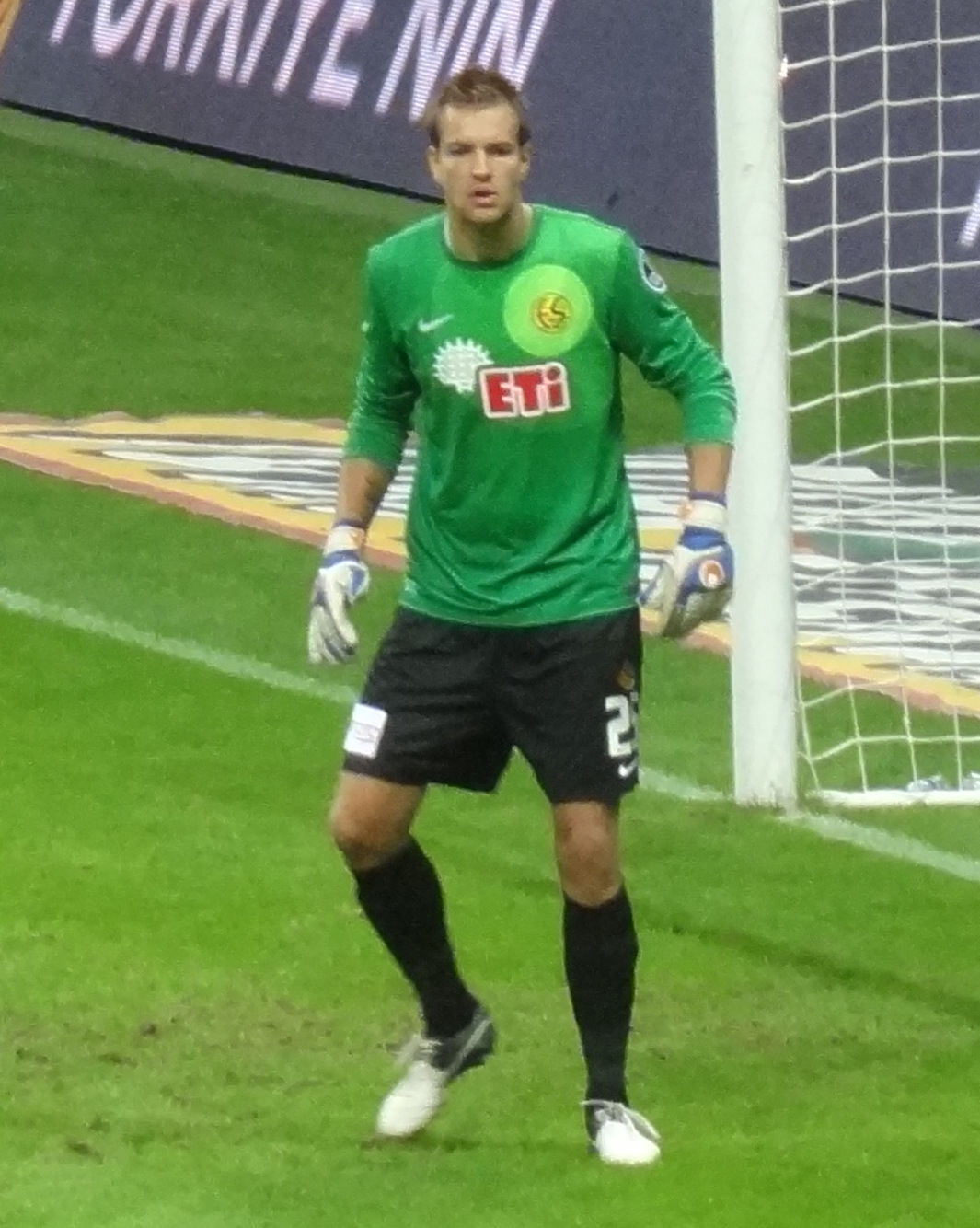
Ruud Boffin

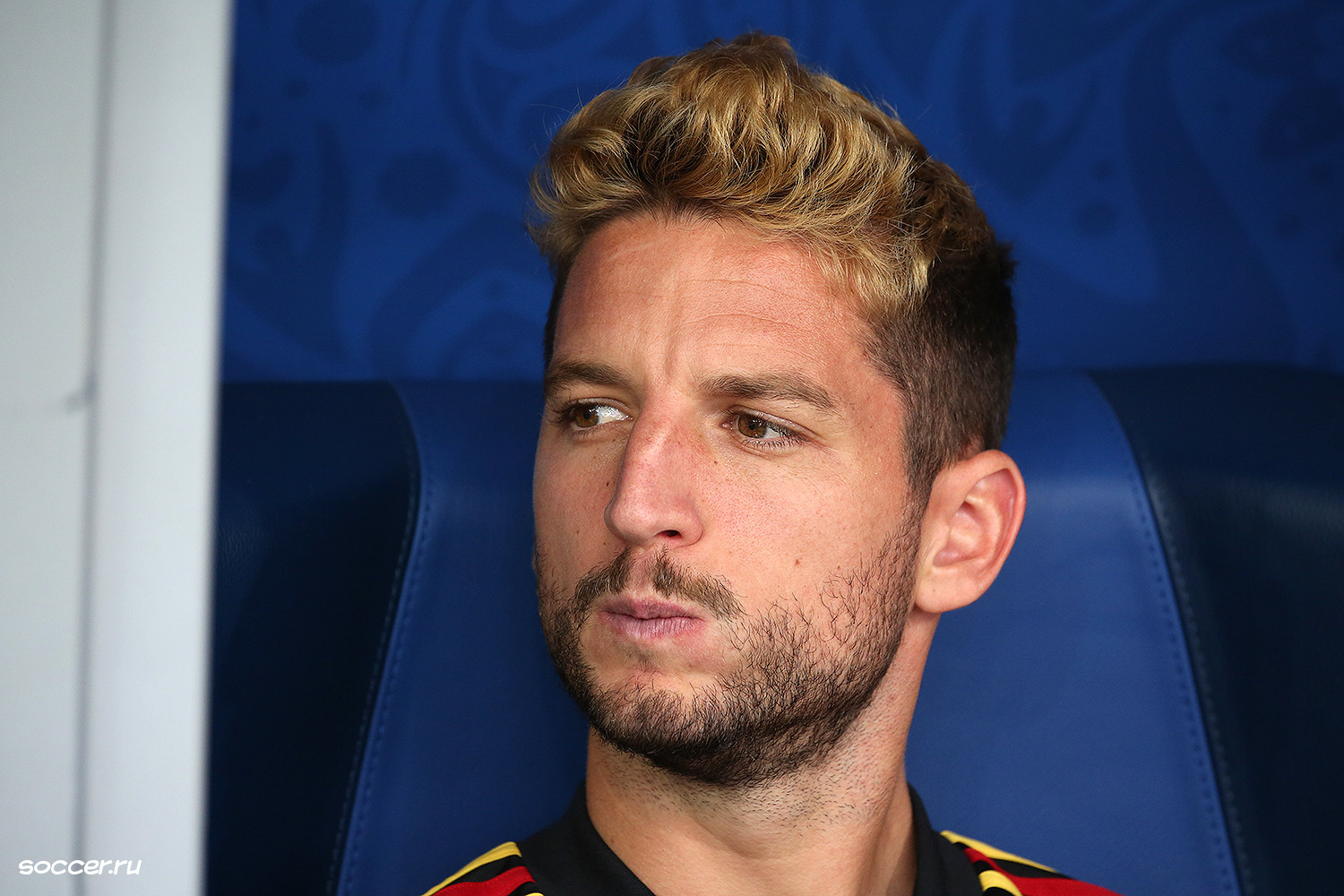
Dries Mertens

- Dino Arslanagić – Göztepe 2021–22
- Yunus Bahadır – Alanyaspor 2023–24
- **Brandon Baiye** – **Erzurumspor** 2026–
- Michy Batshuayi – Beşiktaş, Fenerbahçe, Galatasaray 2021–25
- Geoffrey Mujangi Bia – Kayserispor, Akhisarspor 2017–18
- Ruud Boffin – Eskişehirspor, Antalyaspor 2012–16, 2018–23
- Boli Bolingoli – İstanbul Başakşehir 2020–21
- Gianni Bruno – Eyüpspor 2024–25
- Luis Pedro Cavanda – Trabzonspor, Galatasaray 2015–18
- Nacer Chadli – İstanbul Başakşehir 2020–23
- Karel D'Haene – Trabzonspor 2003–05
- Filip Daems – Gençlerbirliği 2001–05
- Landry Dimata – Samsunspor 2023–26
- Ferhat Dogruel – Altay 1998–99
- Danilo – Antalyaspor 2016–18
- Tom De Sutter – Bursaspor 2015–16
- Jason Denayer – Galatasaray 2015–16
- Adnan Januzaj – İstanbul Başakşehir 2022–23
- Ahmet Karadayi – Kardemir Karabükspor 2017–19
- Fazlı Kocabaş – Kayseri Erciyesspor 2013
- Mert Kurt – Giresunspor 2022–23
- **Romelu Lukaku** – **Fenerbahçe** 2026–
- Tortol Lumanza Lembi – Osmanlıspor 2017–19
- Pieter Mbemba – Sivasspor, Bucaspor 2009–10
- Muhammed Mert – Hatayspor 2020–23
- Dries Mertens – Galatasaray 2022–25
- Thomas Meunier – Trabzonspor 2023–24
- Kevin Mirallas – Gaziantep 2020–21
- Mbo Mpenza – Galatasaray 2001–02
- Julien Ngoy – Kasımpaşa 2023–24
- Rob Nizet – Gaziantep 2025–26
- **Joseph Nonge** – **Kocaelispor** 2025–
- Kazeem Olaigbe – Trabzonspor, Konyaspor 2025–26
- Jean-Marie Pfaff – Trabzonspor 1989–90
- Benito Raman – Samsunspor 2023–24
- Rubenilson – Bursaspor 1998–99
- Hans Somers – Trabzonspor 2001–04
- Nikola Storm – Antalyaspor 2025–26
- Bernd Thijs – Trabzonspor 2004
- Mickaël Tirpan – Kasımpaşa, Samsunspor 2019–24
- **Leandro Trossard** – **Beşiktaş** 2026–
- Adnan Ugur – Fatih Karagümrük – 2021–24
- Jason Vandelannoite – Bursaspor 2007–08
- Björn Vleminckx – Gençlerbirliği, Kayseri Erciyesspor 2012–15
- Ali Yaşar – Konyaspor, İstanbulspor 2019–20, 2022–24

== Benin ==
- Fabien Farnolle – Yeni Malatyaspor, BB Erzurumspor 2017–21
- Christian Akande Kotchoni – Denizlispor, Kartalspor 2007–09
- Damien Chrysostome – Denizlispor 2009–11
- Steve Mounié – Alanyaspor 2025–26
- **Junior Olaitan** – Göztepe, **Beşiktaş** 2025–
- Stéphane Sessègnon – Gençlerbirliği 2017–18, 2019–20

== Bolivia ==
- Ronald Gutiérrez – Bursaspor 2008–09
- Ricardo Pedriel – Sivasspor, Mersin İdmanyurdu 2010–13, 2014–16

== Bosnia and Herzegovina ==
- Edin Ademović – Kasımpaşa 2007–08
- Haris Alihodžić – Antalyaspor 1994
- Kemal Alispahić – Kayserispor 1992–94
- Marin Aničić – Konyaspor 2019–22
- Zlatan Arnautović – Beşiktaş 1983–84
- Alen Avdić – Sakaryaspor 1998
- Branimir Bajić – Denizlispor 2009–10
- Riad Bajić – Konyaspor, İstanbul Başakşehir, Giresunspor, MKE Ankaragücü 2015–20, 2022–24
- Elvir Baljić – Bursaspor, Fenerbahçe, Galatasaray, Konyaspor, MKE Ankaragücü, İstanbulspor 1995–99, 2000–01, 2002–07
- Džemal Berberović – Denizlispor 2009–10
- Elvedin Beganović – Erzurumspor 1998–99
- Ibrahim Begović – Fenerbahçe 1981–83
- Elvir Bolić – Galatasaray, Gaziantepspor, Fenerbahçe İstanbulspor, Gençlerbirliği, Malatyaspor 1992–2000, 2003–06
- Branko Bošnjak – Kayserispor 1985–87
- **Muhamed Buljubašić** – **Çaykur Rizespor** 2024–
- Dženan Bureković – Göztepe 2020–22
- Bego Ćatić – Zeytinburnuspor 1989–92
- Edin Cocalić – Akhisarspor 2018–19
- Andrej Đokanović – MKE Ankaragücü 2022–24
- Edin Džeko – Fenerbahçe 2023–25
- Asim Ferhatović – Fenerbahçe 1963
- Daniel Graovac – Kasımpaşa 2022–23
- **Amir Hadžiahmetović** – Konyaspor, **Beşiktaş**, Çaykur Rizespor 2016–
- Anel Hadžić – Eskişehirspor 2016
- **Haris Hajradinović** – **Kasımpaşa** 2018–
- Izet Hajrović – Galatasaray 2014
- Sead Halilagić (Sead Dost) – İstanbulspor, Beşiktaş, Adanaspor 1997–2001, 2002–03
- Irfan Handžic – Zeytinburnuspor 1989–90
- Kenan Hasagić – Gaziantepspor, İstanbul Büyükşehir Belediyespor 2004–12
- Ajdin Hasić – Beşiktaş 2020–21
- Armin Hodžić – Kasımpaşa 2020–21
- Armin Hodžić – Hatayspor 2023–25
- Tarik Hodžić – Galatasaray, Sarıyer 1983–85
- Kenan Horić – Antalyaspor 2016–17
- Demir Hotić – Fenerbahçe 1993
- Damir Ibrić – Gençlerbirliği 2003–04
- Senijad Ibričić – Gaziantepspor, Kasımpaşa, Kayseri Erciyesspor 2012–14
- Sanel Jahić – Karabükspor 2011–13
- Zlatko Juričević – Karşıyaka 1987–92
- Goran Karačić – Adanaspor, Adana Demirspor 2016–17, 2022–23
- Suad Karalić – Fenerbahçe 1983–84
- Kenan Kodro – Gaziantep 2024–25
- Mersad Kovačević (Mirsad Güneş) – Beşiktaş, Galatasaray, Göztepe 1984–90
- Zvonimir Kožulj – Gaziantep 2020–21
- Rade Krunić – Fenerbahçe 2023–25
- **Enver Kulašin** – **Gaziantep** 2025–
- Josip Kvesić – Antalyaspor 2015
- Zoran Kvržić – Kayserispor 2019–21
- **Ermin Mahmić** – **Çorum** 2026–
- Haris Medunjanin – Gaziantepspor 2012–14
- Adi Mehremić – İstanbulspor 2022–23
- Muris Mešanović – Kayserispor, Denizlispor 2019–21
- Marko Mihojević – Göztepe 2020–22
- Deni Milošević – Konyaspor, Antalyaspor 2016–22, 2023–25
- Zvjezdan Misimović – Galatasaray 2010–11
- **Nihad Mujakić** – MKE Ankaragücü, Eyüpspor, Gaziantep, **Erzurumspor** 2022–24, 2025–
- Samir Muratović – Kocaelispor 1998–99
- Vedin Musić – İstanbulspor, Antalyaspor 1997–2001
- Safet Nadarević – Eskişehirspor 2008–12
- Fahrudin Omerović (Fahrettin Ömerli) – Kocaelispor, İstanbulspor 1992–97
- Rade Paprica – Beşiktaş 1986–87
- Kenan Pirić – Göztepe, Antalyaspor 2021–22, 2024–25
- Miralem Pjanić – Beşiktaş 2021–22
- Ivan Radeljić – Gençlerbirliği, Antalyaspor 2009–12
- Amar Rahmanović – Konyaspor 2020–23
- Sead Ramović – Sivasspor 2010–11
- Srebrenko Repčić – Fenerbahçe 1983–85
- Sead Sabotić – Adanaspor, MKE Ankaragücü 1989–93
- Dario Šarić – Antalyaspor 2025–26
- Jasmin Šćuk – BB Erzurumspor 2018–19
- Dževad Šećerbegović – Beşiktaş 1983–85
- Ibrahim Šehić – Mersin İdmanyurdu, Konyaspor 2011–12, 2020–23
- Mirsad Sejdić – Galatasaray, Bursaspor, Altay, Bkaırköyspor 1981–1988
- Ivan Sesar – Elazığspor 2013, Akhisar Belediyespor 2013–14
- Semir Štilić – Gaziantepspor 2013
- Zijad Švrakić (He has held also Turkey citizenship as "Ziya Yıldız" since 1989) – Adana Demirspor, Galatasaray, Ankaragücü, Karşıyaka 1987–94
- **Dal Varešanović** – **Çaykur Rizespor**, Gençlerbirliği 2023–
- Mirza Varešanović – Bursaspor 2002–05
- **Edin Višća** – İstanbul Başakşehir, **Trabzonspor** 2011–13, 2014–
- Ognjen Vranješ – Elazığspor 2014, Gaziantepspor 2014–16
- Avdija Vršajević – Osmanlıspor, Akhisarspor 2015–19
- Ermin Zec – Gençlerbirliği, Balıkesirspor, Karabükspor 2010–15, 2016–17
- Fahrudin Zejnelović – Fenerbahçe 1982
- Ervin Zukanović – Fatih Karagümrük 2020–22

== Brazil ==
=== A ===
- Abuda – Gaziantepspor 2015–16
- Adriano – Beşiktaş 2016–19
- Adriano – Denizlispor, İstanbul Büyükşehir Belediyespor 2006–08
- Adriano Facchini – Karabükspor 2016–17
- Adriano Magrão – Bursaspor 2008
- Adryan – Kayserispor 2019–20
- Aílton – Beşiktaş 2005–06
- Alan – Kasımpaşa 2020–21
- Alanzinho – Trabzonspor, Balıkesirspor 2008–13, 2014–15
- Alex – Fenerbahçe 2004–12
- Alex Teixeira – Beşiktaş 2021–22
- Alex Telles – Galatasaray 2014–15
- **Allan Godói** – **Göztepe** 2025–
- Allano – Bursaspor – 2018–19
- Amaral – Beşiktaş 2002–03
- Amilton – Antalyaspor, Konyaspor, Çaykur Rizespor 2018–23
- Anderson Silva – Alanyaspor 2023–24
- **Anderson Talisca** – Beşiktaş, **Fenerbahçe** 2016–18, 2024–
- André (Bahia) – Samsunspor 2011–12
- André (Felipe Ribeiro de Souza) – Gaziantep 2020–21
- **André Henrique** – **Göztepe** 2026–
- André Moritz – Kasımpaşa, Kayserispor, Mersin İdmanyurdu 2007–12
- André Santos (André Clarindo dos Santos) – Fenerbahçe 2009–11
- André Santos (André Luís dos Santos) – Gaziantepspor 2002
- Anderson – Sivasspor, Çaykur Rizespor, Eskişehirspor 2005–09
- Antônio Carlos – Beşiktaş 2002–04
- Artur Moraes – Osmanlıspor 2015–16
- Auremir – Sivasspor, BB Erzurumspor 2017–19

=== B ===
- Bady – Gençlerbirliği 2017–18
- Baiano – Alanyaspor 2018–20
- Barbossa Wellington – Kahramanmaraşspor 1988–89
- Beto – Gaziantepspor, Bucaspor, Mersin İdmanyurdu 2008–12
- Bobô – Beşiktaş, Kayserispor 2005–15
- Bruno Mezenga – Orduspor, Akhisar Belediyespor 2012–16
- Bruno Mota – Gaziantepspor 2016–17
- Bruno Peres – Trabzonspor 2021–23
- **Bruno Viana** – Gaziantep, **Alanyaspor** 2024–

=== C ===
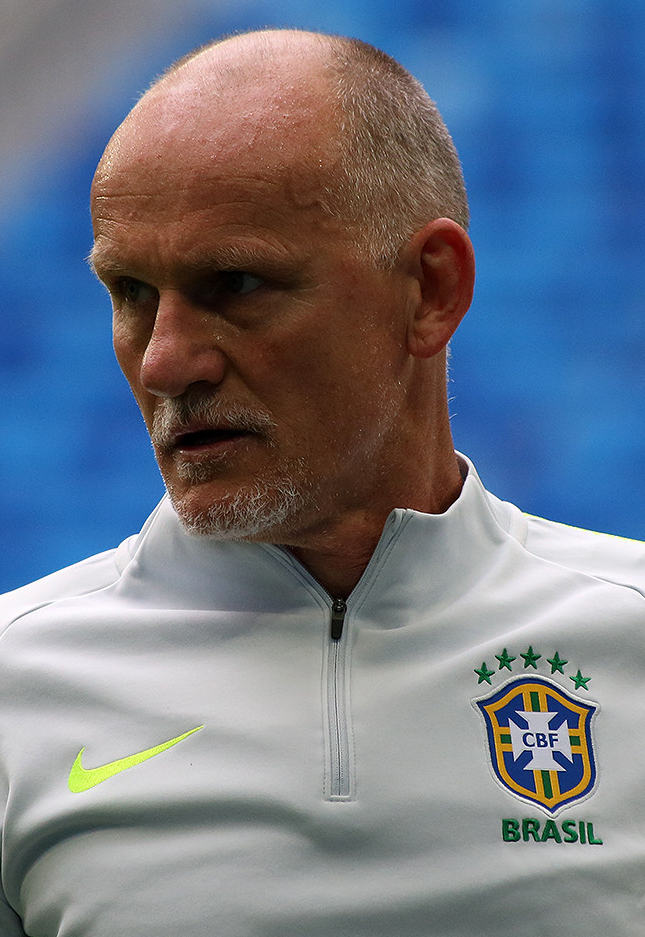
Taffarel

- Capone – Galatasaray, Kocaelispor 1999–2003
- Carlos Alberto – Denizlispor 2007–09
- Carlos Eduardo – Alanyaspor 2023–24
- Carlos Ninja Rodrigo – Çaykur Rizespor 2008–10
- Carlos Vinícius – Galatasaray 2023–24
- César Prates – Galatasaray 2003–04
- Charles – Antalyaspor 2016–20
- Chico – Gaziantepspor, Antalyaspor 2014–20
- Christian – Galatasaray 2002–03
- Serginho Chulapa – Malatyaspor 1988–89
- Cicinho – Sivasspor 2013–16
- Claudemir – Sivasspor 2019–21
- Cláudio Taffarel – Galatasaray 1998–2001
- **Cláudio Winck** – **Kasımpaşa** 2023–
- Cleyton – Kayserispor 2012–14
- Cris – Galatasaray 2012
- Cristian Baroni – Fenerbahçe 2009–14
- Costudio Toledo – Denizlispor 1987–88

=== D ===
- Daniel Rezende – Bursaspor 2009–10
- Danilo Bueno – Mersin İdmanyurdu 2012
- David Braz – Sivasspor – 2018–19
- Davidson – Alanyaspor, İstanbul Başakşehir 2020–22, 2023–25
- Dedê – Eskişehirspor 2011–14
- Deivid – Fenerbahçe 2006–10
- Dentinho – Beşiktaş 2013
- Derley – Kayserispor 2015–16
- Diego – Fenerbahçe 2014–16
- **Diego Carlos** – **Fenerbahçe** 2024–
- Djalma Bastos de Oliveira – Boluspor 1988–90
- Didi – Adanaspor 2016–17
- Diego Ângelo – Eskişehirspor, Antalyaspor, Kayserispor, Gençlerbirliği 2010–21
- Diego Lima – Akhisar Belediyespor 2012–13
- Diego Lopes – Kayserispor 2015–16
- Digão – Adanaspor 2016–17
- Djalma Silva – Göztepe 2024–25
- Doka Madureira – İstanbul Başakşehir, MKE Ankaragücü 2011–13, 2014–18
- Dória – Yeni Malatyaspor 2017–18
- Douglão – Akhisar Belediyespor 2014–16
- Douglas (Chagas Matos) – Alanyaspor – 2017–18
- Douglas (Franco Teixeira) – Trabzonspor 2015–16
- Douglas (Pereira dos Santos) – Sivasspor, Beşiktaş – 2018–20
- Douglas (Silva Bacelar) – Giresunspor 2021–22
- Dyego Rocha Coelho – Karabükspor 2011

=== E ===
- Éder – Malatyaspor 1988
- **Ederson** – **Fenerbahçe** 2025–
- Edgar Silva – Adanaspor 2016–17
- Edu – Beşiktaş 2011–12
- Edu Dracena – Fenerbahçe 2006–09
- Eduardo (Ferreira Abdo Pacheco) – Gaziantepspor 2008–09
- Eduardo (Suisso De Novaes) – Trabzonspor 2001–02
- Elano – Galatasaray 2009–10
- Emerson – Trabzonspor 2012–13
- Emersonn – Göztepe 2024–26

=== F ===
- Fabiano (Eller) – Trabzonspor 2005–06
- Fabiano (Leismann) – Denizlispor 2020–21
- Fabiano (Lima Rodrigues) – Fenerbahçe 2004–05
- Fabiano (Silva) – Kasımpaşa 2022–23
- **Fabinho** – **Trabzonspor** 2026–
- Fábio Bilica – Sivasspor, Fenerbahçe, Elazığspor 2008–14
- Fábio Luciano – Fenerbahçe 2003–06
- Fábio Pinto – Galatasaray 2002–03
- Fabrício Baiano – Gençlerbirliği, Çaykur Rizespor 2019–22
- Felipe – Galatasaray 2002–03
- Felipe Augusto – Trabzonspor 2025–26
- Felipe Melo – Galatasaray 2011–15
- Fernandão – Bursaspor, Fenerbahçe 2013–18
- **Fernando (Andrade dos Santos)** – Sivasspor, Çaykur Rizespor, **Erzurumspor** 2019–21, 2026–
- Fernando (Boldrin) – Kayserispor, Çaykur Rizespor 2017–22
- Fernando (Lucas Martins) – Antalyaspor – 2021–23
- Fernando (Francisco Reges Mouta) – Galatasaray 2017–19
- Fernando Filho – Zeytinburnuspor 1990–91
- Filipe Augusto – Alanyaspor – 2017–19
- Flávio Conceição – Galatasaray 2004–05
- Flávio Medeiros – Trabzonspor, Giresunspor – 2020–22
- Flávio Ramos – Gençlerbirliği 2019–20
- Francisco Lima – Gaziantepspor 1996–98
- **Fred** – **Fenerbahçe** 2023–

=== G ===
- Gabriel – Manisaspor 2009–10
- Gabriel Paulista – Beşiktaş 2024–26
- **Gabriel Sara** – **Galatasaray** 2024–
- Carlos Roberto Gallo – Malatyaspor 1988–90
- Gérson – Fenerbahçe, İstanbulspor 1991–93, 1996–97
- Giuliano – Fenerbahçe, İstanbul Başakşehir 2017–18, 2020–21
- Gökçek Vederson – Ankaraspor, Fenerbahçe, Bursaspor, Antalyaspor, Mersin İdmanyurdu 2003–16
- Gralak – İstanbulspor 1998–2001
- Guilherme (Costa Marques) – Yeni Malatyaspor, Trabzonspor, Göztepe 2018–21
- **Guilherme (Haubert Sityá)** – **Konyaspor** 2019–
- Guilherme (Milhomem Gusmão) – Antalyaspor 2015–16
- **Guilherme Luiz** – **Göztepe** 2025–
- Gustavo Assunção – Galatasaray 2021–22
- Gustavo Campanharo – Kayserispor 2019–23
- Gustavo Henrique – Fenerbahçe 2022–23
- Gustavo Sauer – Çaykur Rizespor 2023–24

=== H ===
- **Héliton** – **Göztepe** 2024–
- Helton Leite – Antalyaspor 2022–24

=== I ===
- Ivan – Gaziantepspor, Mersin İdmanyurdu 2008–13

=== J ===
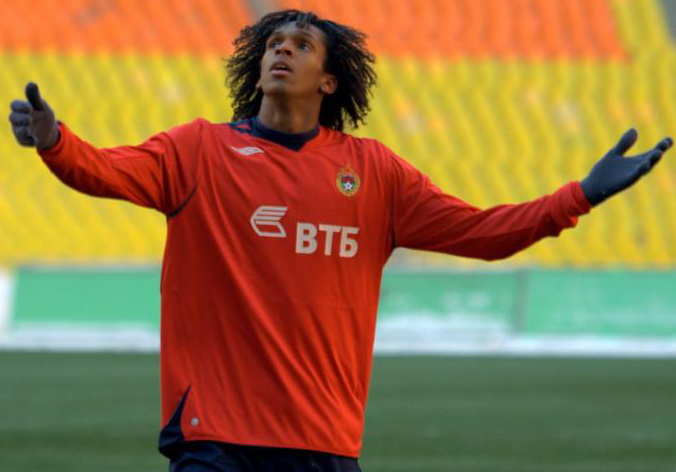
Jô

- Jabá – Ankaraspor, MKE Ankaragücü 2003–06, 2007–09
- Jackson – İstanbulspor 2023–24
- Jailson – Fenerbahçe 2018–20
- Jaílton Paraíba – Gençlerbirliği 2017–19
- Jajá – Trabzonspor, Kayserispor 2010–11, 2012–13
- **Janderson** – **Göztepe** 2025–
- **Jeh** – **Göztepe** 2025–
- Jô – Galatasaray 2009–10
- João Batista (Mertol Karatay) – Gaziantepspor, Galatasaray, Konyaspor 1996–97, 2000–01, 2002–04, 2005–09
- João Vitor – Gaziantepspor 2015
- Jefferson (de Oliveira Galvão) – Trabzonspor, Konyaspor 2005–09
- Jefferson (Nogueira Júnior) – Gaziantep 2019–22
- Jones Carioca – Karabükspor 2014
- **Juan** – **Göztepe** 2024–
- Juan Christian – Alanyaspor 2024–25
- Júlio César (António de Souza) – Gaziantepspor, Samsunspor, Kayseri Erciyesspor 2001–05
- Júlio César (Mendes Moreira) – Denizlispor, Kocaelispor 2006–09
- Júlio César (Santos Correa) – Gaziantepspor 2008–10
- Juninho Cearense – Samsunspor 2003
- Júnior – Bursaspor 2002–03
- Júnior Morais – Gaziantep 2019–21, 2023–24

=== K ===
- Kadu – Göztepe 2017–19
- Kahê – Gençlerbirliği, Manisaspor, Denizlispor, Karşıyaka 2007–15
- Kauê – Konyaspor 2003–10
- Kléberson – Beşiktaş 2005–07

=== L ===
- Leandrinho – Sivasspor, Karabükspor 2017–18
- Leandro – Bursaspor 2008
- Leandro Rodríguez – Çaykur Rizespor 2007–08
- Léo Duarte – İstanbul Başakşehir 2020–26
- Lincoln – Galatasaray 2007–09
- Lincoln – Fenerbahçe 2022–23
- Lourency – Göztepe 2021–22
- Luan Peres – Fenerbahçe 2022–23
- Luan Scapolan – Akhisar Belediyespor 2014–15
- **Lucas Calegari** – **Eyüpspor** 2025–
- Lucas Lima – İstanbul Başakşehir 2021–25
- **Luccas Claro** – **Eyüpspor** 2024–
- Luiz Adriano – Antalyaspor 2021–23
- Luiz Gustavo – Fenerbahçe 2019–22
- Luiz Henrique – MKE Ankaragücü, Kasımpaşa 2008–11

=== M ===
- Maicon (Marques) – Antalyaspor 2017–19
- Maicon (Pereira Roque) – Galatasaray 2017–19
- Marçal – Gaziantepspor 2015–16
- Marcão – Galatasaray 2018–22
- Marcão – Fatih Karagümrük 2023–24
- Marcelinho Paraíba – Trabzonspor 2006
- Marcelinho Rodrigues – Bursaspor 2008
- Marcelo – Beşiktaş 2016–17
- Marcelo Goiano – Sivasspor 2019–21
- Márcio – Galatasaray 1999–2001
- Marcio Jarro – Trabzonspor 2001–02
- Marcello Thomas Monteiro – Gaziantepspor 1990–96
- Márcio Mossoró – İstanbul Başakşehir, Göztepe 2014–21
- **Marcos Felipe** – Eyüpspor, **Çorum** 2025–
- Marcus Vinícius Cesário – İstanbul Büyükşehir Belediyespor 2007–13
- Mariano – Galatasaray 2017–20
- Mário Jardel – Galatasaray 2000–01
- Marlon Xavier – Trabzonspor 2020–21
- Marquinhos – Çaykur Rizespor, İstanbul Büyükşehir Belediyespor 2007–11
- Mateus Alonso Honorio – MKE Ankaragücü 2007–09
- Maurício Ramos – Adanaspor, Çaykur Rizespor 2016–18
- Mert Nobre – Fenerbahçe, Beşiktaş, Mersin İdmanyurdu, Kayserispor 2004–15

=== N ===
- Naldo – Antalyaspor 2020–22, 2023–24

=== P ===
- Pablo Santos – Hatayspor 2020–21
- Paulino Miranda – Kahramanmaraşspor 1988–90
- Paulo Henrique – Trabzonspor 2011–14
- Paulo Pimentel – Denizlispor 2003–06
- **Paulo Victor** – Gaziantepspor, **Alanyaspor** 2016–17, 2025–
- **Pedrinho** – **Konyaspor** 2024–
- Pedro Henrique – Kayserispor, Sivasspor 2019–22
- Pedro Oldoni – Sivasspor 2014

=== R ===
- Rafael (Mariano) – Manisaspor 2006–08
- Rafael (Pereira da Silva) – İstanbul Başakşehir 2020–21
- Ramon Motta – Beşiktaş, Antalyaspor 2013–17
- Renan Diniz – Adanaspor 2016–17
- Renan Foguinho – Adanaspor 2016–17
- Renato Cajá – Bursaspor 2014
- Reynaldo – Adanaspor 2016–17
- **Rhaldney** – **Göztepe** 2025–
- Rhodolfo – Beşiktaş 2015–17
- Ricardinho – Beşiktaş 2006–08
- Ricardo – Ankaragücü 2019–21
- Richard – Alanyaspor 2023–25
- Roberto Carlos – Fenerbahçe 2007–10
- Robinho – Sivasspor, Istanbul Basaksehir 2017–20
- Robson – Trabzonspor 2001–02
- **Rodrigo Becão** – Fenerbahçe, **Kasımpaşa** 2023–
- Rodrigo Tabata – Gaziantepspor, Beşiktaş 2008–10
- Rogério – Antalyaspor, Göztepe 1998–2000
- Rogério Oliveira – Trabzonspor, Vanspor 1999–2000
- Rômulo – Göztepe 2024–25
- Ronaldo – Beşiktaş 2001–05
- Ronaldo Mendes – Çaykur Rizespor 2021–22
- Roni – Adanaspor 2016–17
- Rovérsio – Orduspor 2012–13
- Ruan – Göztepe 2025–26
- **Ruan** – **Alanyaspor** 2025–

=== S ===
- Sandro (da Silva Mendonça) – Hacettepe, Gençlerbirliği, Sivasspor 2007–10, 2011–12
- Sandro (Raniere Guimarães Cordeiro) – Antalyaspor 2017–18
- Sandro Lima – Gençlerbirliği 2020–22
- Serginho (Sérgio Antônio Borges Júnior) – Akhisar Belediyespor 2017–19
- Serginho (Sérgio Antônio de Luiz Júnior) – Giresunspor, Fatih Karagümrük 2021–23, 2025–26
- Sérgio Neves – Fenerbahçe, Sakaryaspor 1998–99
- Sérgio Oliveira – Sivasspor 2008–09
- Sidnei – Beşiktaş 2011–12
- Simão – Fenerbahçe, MKE Ankaragücü 2002–03
- Jorge Luiz Sousa – Gaziantepspor 2009–11
- Souza – Fenerbahçe, Beşiktaş, İstanbul Başakşehir 2015–18, 2020–24

=== T ===
- Tadeu – Bursaspor 2009–10
- Tetê – Galatasaray 2023–24
- Thaciano – Altay 2021–22
- **Thalisson** – Antalyaspor, **Gençlerbirliği** 2024–
- Thuram – Konyaspor, Pendikspor 2019–20, 2023–24
- Tita – Ankaraspor, MKE Ankaragücü, Antalyaspor, Mersin İdmanyurdu 2004–07, 2008–16
- Titi – Kasımpaşa 2015–17
- Tom – İstanbul Büyükşehir Belediyespor 2012–13, 2014
- Tozo – Hacettepe, Gençlerbirliği, Karabükspor 2007–11

=== V ===
- Vágner Love – Alanyaspor, Beşiktaş 2016–19
- Valdomiro – Samsunspor 2011–12
- Victor Hugo – Göztepe 2024–25
- Vinicius Oliveira – Kahramanmaraşspor 1988–90
- Viola – Gaziantepspor 2002–03
- Vitor Hugo – Trabzonspor 2020–23

=== W ===
- Wágner – Gaziantepspor 2010–12
- Wallace (Fortuna dos Santos) – Yeni Malatyaspor 2020–22
- Wallace (Machado da Silva) – Sarıyer 1988–91
- Washington – Fenerbahçe 2001–02
- Washington Mascarenhas – Konyaspor 2008
- Welinton – Alanyaspor, Beşiktaş, Pendikspor – 2017–24
- Welliton – Mersin İdmanyurdu, Kayserispor 2014–17
- William – Kayserispor 2016
- Willian Arão – Fenerbahçe 2022–23
- Wílton Figueiredo – Gaziantepspor 2013

=== Y ===
- Yan Sasse – Çaykur Rizespor 2019–20

== Bulgaria ==
- Emil Angelov – Denizlispor, Karabükspor 2009–11
- Dimcho Belyakov – Gaziantepspor 1998
- Vasil Bozhikov– Kasımpaşa 2015–17
- Ivan Cvetkov – Sivasspor 2006–08
- Nikolay Dimitrov – Kasımpaşa 2010–12
- Zdravko Dimitrov – Bodrum 2024–25
- Doncho Donev – Sarıyer, Vanspor, Denizlispor 1996–2000
- Ivko Ganchev – Bursaspor, Çaykur Rizespor 1992–2000
- Iliya Gruev – Altay 1992–93, 1994–95
- Ilian Iliev – Altay 1993–94
- Ismail Isa – Karabükspor 2011–12
- Dimitar Ivankov – Kayserispor, Bursaspor 2005–11
- Ruzhin Kerimov – Altay 1986–87
- Rosen Kirilov – Adanaspor 1999–2001
- Radostin Kishishev – Bursaspor 1997–98
- Emil Kostadinov – Fenerbahçe 1996–97
- **Filip Krastev** – **Göztepe** 2025–
- Zdravko Lazarov – Kocaelispor, Gaziantepspor, Kayseri Erciyesspor 2000–07
- Yordan Letchkov – Beşiktaş 1997–98
- Georgi Markov – Trabzonspor 2002
- Martin Minchev – Çaykur Rizespor 2023–25
- Veselin Minev – Antalyaspor 2011–12
- Nikolay Mihaylov – Mersin İdmanyurdu 2014–2016
- Nesim Özgür – Galatasaray, İstanbulspor, Trabzonspor, Malatyaspor 1991–2002
- Slavcho Pavlov – Kayserispor 1994–96
- Predrag Pažin – Kocaelispor 2000–02
- Ivaylo Petkov – İstanbulspor, Fenerbahçe 2002–04
- Ivelin Popov – Gaziantepspor 2010–12
- Strahil Popov – Kasımpaşa, Hatayspor, Ümraniyespor 2015–23
- Dimitar Rangelov – Konyaspor 2014–17
- Vladko Shalamanov – Altay 1996–97
- Georgi Sarmov – Kasımpaşa 2010–11, 2012–13
- Stanimir Stoilov – Fenerbahçe 1992–93
- Nikolay Todorov – Sarıyer 1996–97
- Iliya Valov – Karşıyaka, Denizlispor 1992–95
- Kostadin Vidolov – Bursaspor 1997–2000
- Todor Yanchev – Trabzonspor 2001
- Zlatko Yankov – Beşiktaş, Adanaspor, Vanspor, Gençlerbirliği 1996–2000
- Alex Yordanov – Kocaelispor, İstanbulspor, Kayserispor, Konyaspor, MKE Ankaragücü 2000–06
- Zdravko Zdravkov – İstanbulspor, Adanaspor, Çaykur Rizespor 1997–2002, 2004–07

== Burkina Faso ==
- Aristide Bancé – Samsunspor 2011–12
- Bryan Dabo – Çaykur Rizespor 2021–22
- Mahamoudou Kéré – Konyaspor 2010–11
- Bakary Koné – MKE Ankaragücü 2018–19
- Djakaridja Koné – Sivasspor 2015–16
- **Adamo Nagalo** – **Konyaspor** 2025–
- Préjuce Nakoulma – Mersin İdmanyurdu, Kayserispor 2014–17
- Rahim Ouédraogo – Manisaspor 2009–10
- Abdou Razack Traoré – Gaziantepspor, Karabükspor, Konyaspor, Sivasspor 2013–20
- Bakary Soro – Osmanlıspor 2015–16
- Abdoulaye Soulama Traoré – Denizlispor 2000–02
- Alain Traoré – Kayserispor 2016–17
- Lamine Traoré – Gençlerbirliği 2006–09

== Burundi ==
- Eric Ndizeye – Yeni Malatyaspor 2020–21
- Faty Papy – Trabzonspor 2009
- Youssouf Ndayishimiye – Yeni Malatyaspor, İstanbul Başakşehir 2019–23
- Jospin Nshimirimana – Yeni Malatyaspor 2021–23
- Saidi Ntibazonkiza – Akhisar Belediyespor 2014–15

== Cameroon ==
- Vincent Aboubakar – Beşiktaş, Hatayspor 2016–17, 2020–21, 2022–25
- Stéphane Bahoken – Kasımpaşa, Kayserispor 2022–25
- Christian Bassogog – MKE Ankaragücü 2023–24
- Gustave Bebbe – Konyaspor, MKE Ankaragücü, İstanbul Büyükşehir Belediyespor, Diyarbakırspor, Kasımpaşa 2005–06, 2007–11
- Severin Brice Bikoko – Akhisar Belediyespor 2012
- Jean-Claude Billong – Hatayspor 2020–21
- Gilles Binya – Gaziantepspor 2011–15
- Alioum Boukar (Ali Uyanık) – Samsunspor, İstanbulspor, Konyaspor 1995–2005, 2008–10
- Henri Bienvenu – Fenerbahçe, Eskişehirspor 2011–12, 2013–14
- **Malcom Bokele** – **Göztepe** 2024–
- Joseph Boum – Mersin İdmanyurdu, Antalyaspor 2011–14
- Petrus Boumal – BB Erzurumpsor 2020–21
- **Iván Cédric** – **Alanyaspor** 2026–
- Ghislain Lazare Chameni – Altay 2002–03
- Aurélien Chedjou – Galatasaray, İstanbul Başakşehir, Bursaspor, Adana Demirspor 2013–21
- Armand Deumi – Gaziantepspor, Karabükspor 2007–13
- Arnaud Djoum – Akhisar Belediyespor 2014–15
- Lionel Enguene – Antalyaspor 2016
- Mbilla Etame – Antalyaspor, Alanyaspor 2015–19
- Samuel Eto'o – Antalyaspor 2015–18
- Franck Etoundi – Kasımpaşa 2015–17
- Francis Mbonjo Etouke – Adanaspor 2000
- Souleymanou Hamidou – Çaykur Rizespor, Denizlispor, Kayserispor 2000–02, 2003–11
- Charles Itandje – Konyaspor, Çaykur Rizespor, Gaziantepspor 2013–14, 2015–17
- Joseph-Désiré Job – Diyarbakırspor 2009–10
- Raymond Kalla – Sivasspor 2005–06
- Carlos Kameni – Fenerbahçe 2017–18
- Jean-Armel Kana-Biyik – Kayserispor, Gaziantep 2016–21
- **Olivier Kemen** – Kayserispor, **İstanbul Başakşehir** 2021–
- Marc Kibong Mbamba – Konyaspor 2013–14
- Guy Kilama – Hatayspor 2023–25
- Dorge Kouemaha – Gaziantepspor 2013
- Wato Kuaté – Akhisar Belediyespor 2014
- Léonard Kweuke – Çaykur Rizespor 2013–17
- Didier Lamkel Zé – Hatayspor 2023–24
- Georges Mandjeck – Kayseri Erciyesspor 2013–15
- John Mary – Çaykur Rizespor 2023–24
- Jean-Jacques Missé-Missé – Trabzonspor 1997
- Sammy N'Djock – Antalyaspor 2010–13
- Landry N'Guémo – Akhisar Belediyespor, Kayserispor 2015–17
- Geremi Njitap – Gençlerbirliği, MKE Ankaragücü 1997–99, 2010
- Dany Nounkeu – Gaziantepspor, Galatasaray, Beşiktaş, Bursaspor, Karabükspor, Akhisar Belediyespor 2010–14, 2015–19
- Joseph Desire Mawaye – Kasımpaşa 2008–09
- Jean Makoun – Antalyaspor 2015–17
- Stéphane Mbia – Trabzonspor 2015–16
- Jacques Momha – Gençlerbirliği, Diyarbakırspor, Manisaspor 2008–11
- Clinton N'Jie – Sivasspor 2022–24
- Georges-Kévin Nkoudou – Beşiktaş 2019–23
- Nicolas Nkoulou – Gaziantep 2023–24
- Olivier Ntcham – Samsunspor 2023–26
- Paul-Georges Ntep – Kayserispor 2019–20
- Salomon Olembé – Kayserispor 2008–09
- **André Onana** – **Trabzonspor** 2025–
- **Jean Onana** – **Beşiktaş** 2023–
- **Jérôme Onguéné** – **Eyüpspor** 2025–
- Jean-Emmanuel Effa Owona – Elazığspor, MKE Ankaragücü 2002–04
- Alioum Saidou – İstanbulspor, Galatasaray, Kayserispor, Sivasspor 2002–06, 2007–09, 2010–11
- Rigobert Song – Galatasaray, Trabzonspor 2004–10
- Kévin Soni – Hatayspor, Adana Demirspor 2022–23
- Adolphe Teikeu – BB Erzurumspor 2020–21
- Hervé Tum – Bursaspor, Sivasspor, İstanbul Büyükşehir Belediyespor, Gençlerbirliği, Elazığspor 2007–12
- Pierre Webó – İstanbul Büyükşehir Belediyespor, Fenerbahçe, Osmanlıspor 2011–17
- Jacques Zoua – Kayseri Erciyesspor 2014–15

== Canada ==
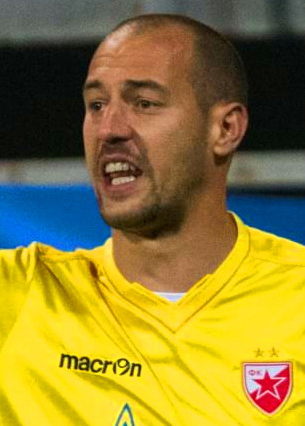
Milan Borjan

- Sam Adekugbe – Hatayspor, Galatasaray 2021–23
- Milan Borjan – Sivasspor 2011–14
- Atiba Hutchinson – Beşiktaş 2013–23
- Michael Klukowski – MKE Ankaragücü, Manisaspor 2010–12
- Cyle Larin – Beşiktaş 2017–19, 2020–22
- Josh Simpson – Manisaspor 2009–12

== Cape Verde ==
- Bébé – Beşiktaş 2011–12
- **David Costa** – **Eyüpspor** 2026–
- **Nuno da Costa** – Kasımpaşa, **İstanbul Başakşehir** 2023–
- Dady – Bucaspor 2010–11
- Djaniny – Trabzonspor 2020–23
- Ivanildo Fernandes – Trabzonspor, Çaykur Rizespor 2019–20
- Ricardo Gomes – BB Erzurumpsor 2020–21
- Kuca – Karabükspor 2015
- **Sidny Lopes Cabral** – **Trabzonspor** 2026–
- Zé Luís – Hatayspor 2022–23
- **Elson Mendes** – **Kasımpaşa** 2026–
- Ryan Mendes – Kayserispor, Fatih Karagümrük, Kocaelispor 2017–18, 2023–24, 2025–26
- Sandro Mendes – Manisaspor 2005
- Jamiro Monteiro – Gaziantep 2023–24
- Néné – Çaykur Rizespor 2003–04
- **Wagner Pina** – **Trabzonspor** 2025–
- Carlos Ponck – İstanbul Başakşehir, Çaykur Rizespor 2019–22
- Garry Rodrigues – Galatasaray, Fenerbahçe S.K., MKE Ankaragücü, Sivasspor 2016–20, 2023–25

== Central African Republic ==
- Habib Habibou – Gaziantepspor 2016
- Isaac Solet – Göztepe 2024–25

== Chad ==
- **Marius Mouandilmadji** – **Samsunspor** 2023–
- Ezechiel N'Douassel – Konyaspor 2013–14
- Casimir Ninga – Sivasspor 2020–21

== Chile ==
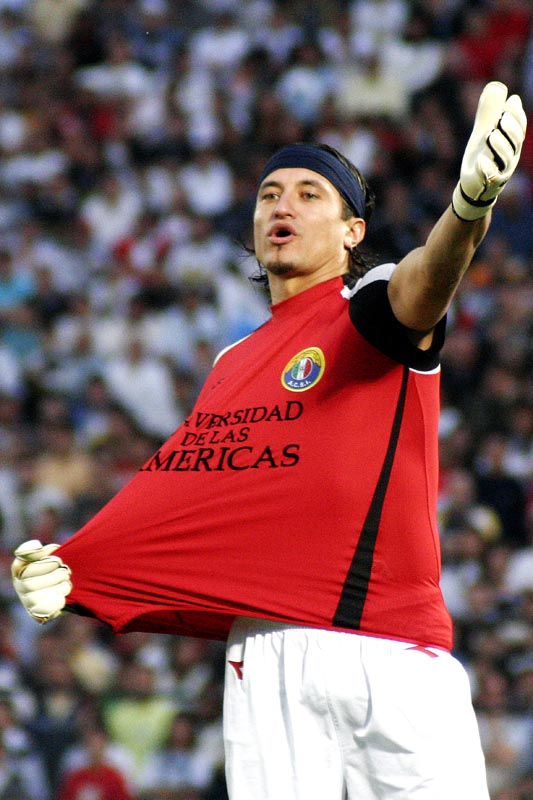
Nicolás Peric

- Gonzalo Espinoza – Kayserispor 2017–18
- Júnior Fernándes – Alanyaspor, İstanbul Başakşehir 2017–21
- Mauricio Isla – Fenerbahçe 2017–20
- Claudio Maldonado – Fenerbahçe 2008–09
- Cristóbal Jorquera – Eskişehirspor, Bursaspor 2013–14, 2015–18
- Igor Lichnovsky – Fatih Karagümrük 2025–26
- Gary Medel – Beşiktaş 2017–20
- Manuel Neira – Gaziantepspor 2007–08
- Nicolás Peric – Gençlerbirliği 2007–09
- César Pinares – Altay 2021–22
- Erick Pulgar – Galatasaray 2021–22
- Sebastián Pinto – Bursaspor, Eskişehirspor 2011–14, 2015–16
- **Martín Rodríguez** – Altay, **Erzurumspor** 2021–22, 2026–
- **Enzo Roco** – Beşiktaş, **Fatih Karagümrük** 2018–21, 2025–
- Ángelo Sagal – Denizlispor, Gaziantep 2020–23
- Rodrigo Tello – Beşiktaş, Eskişehirspor, Elazığspor 2007–14

== China ==
- Wu Shaocong – İstanbul Başakşehir 2022–23

== Colombia ==
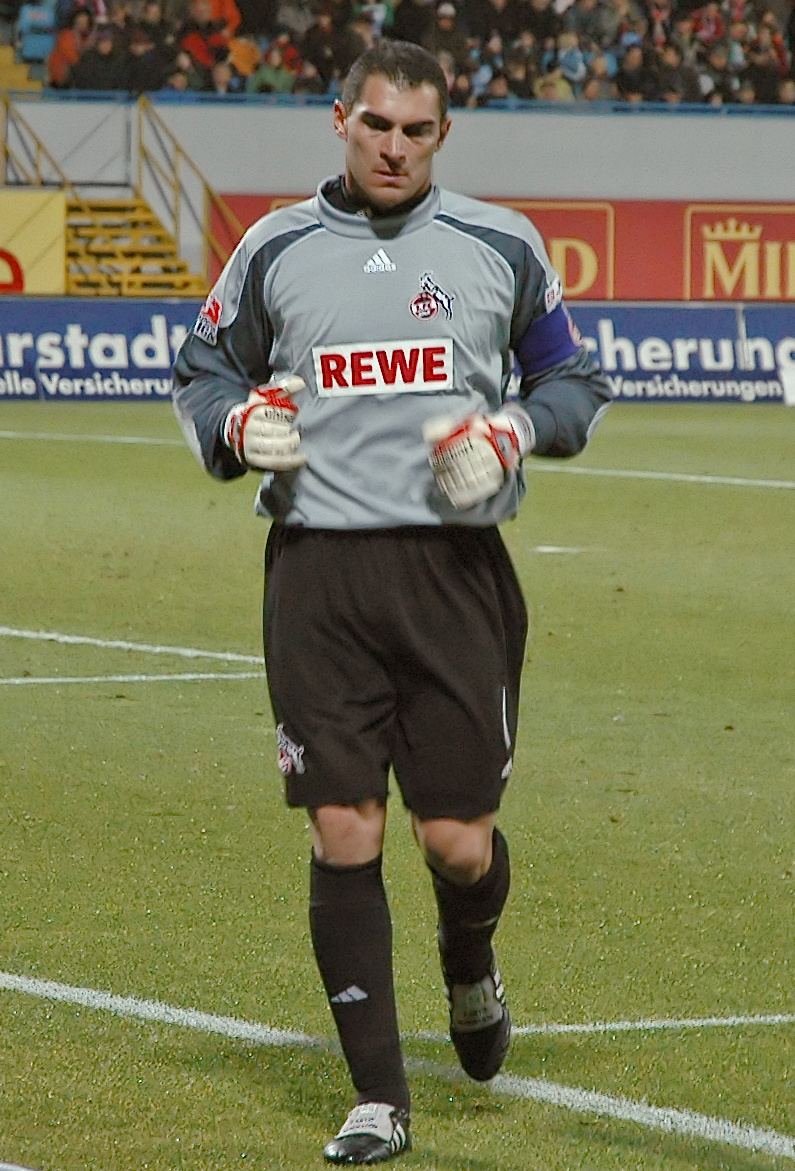
Faryd Mondragon

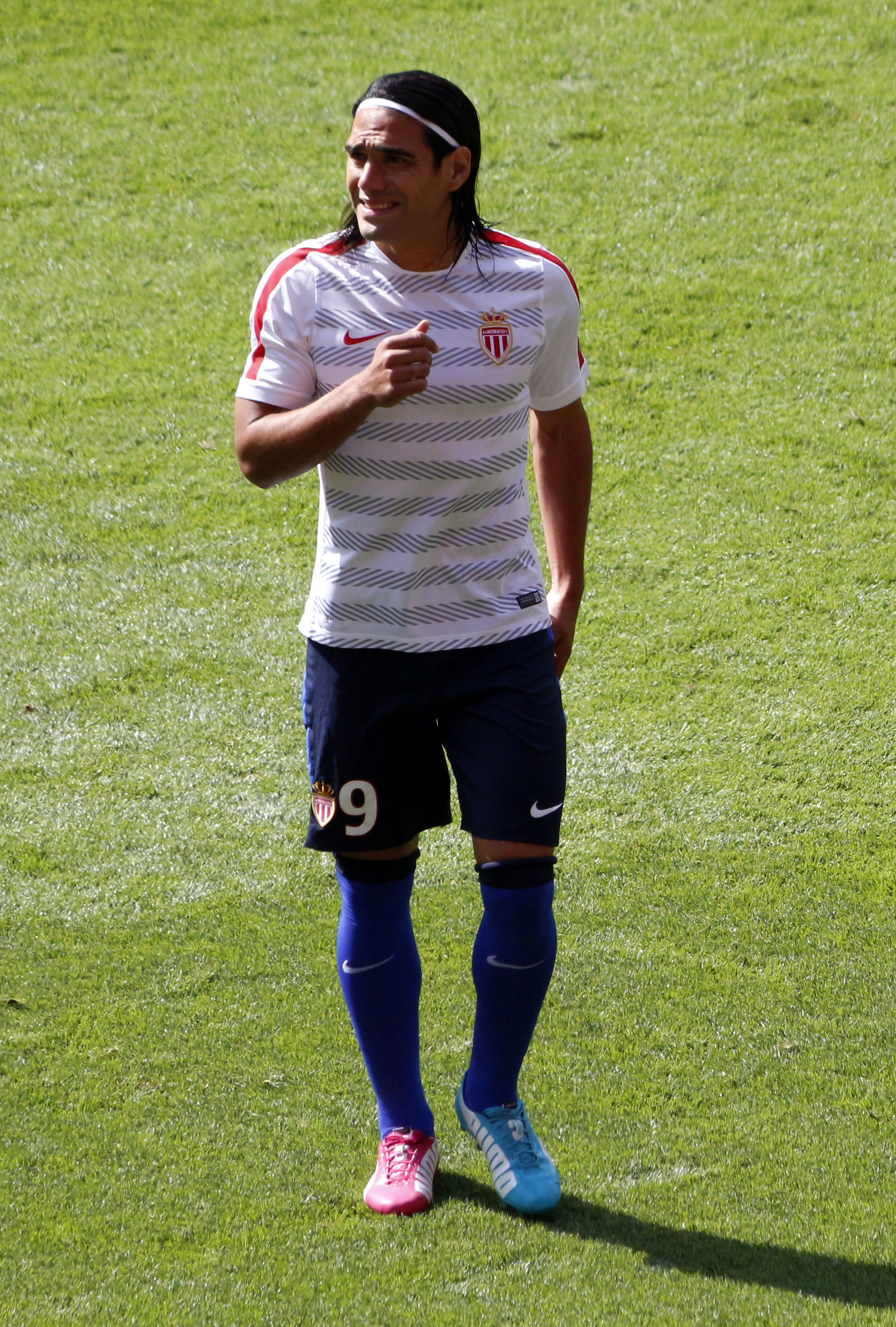
Radamel Falcao

- Yáser Asprilla – Galatasaray 2025–26
- Cristian Borja – Alanyaspor 2021–22
- Jorman Campuzano – Giresunspor 2022–23
- Fabián Castillo – Trabzonspor 2016–18
- Óscar Córdoba – Beşiktaş, Antalyaspor 2002–07
- Carlos Cuesta – Galatasaray 2024–25
- Álvaro Domínguez – Samsunspor 2011–12
- Jhon Durán – Fenerbahçe 2025–26
- Oscar Estupiñán – Denizlispor 2019–20
- Radamel Falcao – Galatasaray 2019–22
- Pedro Franco – Beşiktaş 2014–16
- David González – Çaykur Rizespor 2007–08
- Jersson González – Galatasaray 2001–02
- Teófilo Gutiérrez – Trabzonspor 2010–11
- Luís Martínez – Sakaryaspor, Manisaspor 2006, 2008–09
- Robert Mejía – Giresunspor 2022–23
- Stiven Mendoza – Adana Demirspor 2023–24
- Faryd Mondragón – Galatasaray 2001–07
- Johnnier Montaño – Konyaspor 2010–11
- Marlos Moreno – Konyaspor 2022–24
- Alexis Pérez – Giresunspor 2021–23
- Juan Pablo Pino – Galatasaray 2010–11
- Rubiel Quintana – Çaykur Rizespor 2003–04
- Michael Rangel – Kasımpaşa 2017–18
- Brayan Riascos – Gaziantep 2023–24
- Hugo Rodallega – Akhisar Belediyespor, Trabzonspor, Denizlispor 2015–21
- **Davinson Sánchez** – **Galatasaray** 2023–
- Ángel Torres – Eyüpspor 2025–26
- Devis Vásquez – Beşiktaş 2025–26
- Gustavo Victoria – Galatasaray, Gaziantepspor, Çaykur Rizespor 2001–03, 2005–08
- Róbinson Zapata – Galatasaray 2010–11

== Comoros ==
- Ali Ahamada – Kayserispor 2016–18
- **Rayan Lutin** – **Amedspor** 2026–

== Costa Rica ==
- Esteban Alvarado – Trabzonspor 2015–18
- Hansell Arauz – Kayseri Erciyesspor 2013
- Randall Azofeifa – Gençlerbirliği, Kayseri Erciyesspor 2011–14
- Celso Borges – Göztepe 2018–20
- Francisco Calvo – Konyaspor, Hatayspor 2022–25

== Côte d'Ivoire ==
- Sam Dominique Abouo – Siirtspor 2000–01
- Stephane Acka – BB Erzurumspor 2018–19
- **Emmanuel Agbadou** – **Beşiktaş** 2025–
- Serge Arnaud Aka – Altay 2021–22
- Davy Claude Angan – Gaziantepspor 2016–17
- **Jaurès Assoumou** – **Samsunspor** 2025–
- Serge Aurier – Galatasaray 2023–24
- Eric Bailly – Beşiktaş 2023–24
- Daouda Bamba – Altay 2021–22
- Sol Bamba – Trabzonspor 2012–13
- Yacouba Bamba – Diyarbakırspor 2004–05
- Yohan Boli – Antalyaspor 2025–26
- **Drissa Camara** – **Gaziantep** 2025–
- Kafoumba Coulibaly – Kasımpaşa 2012–14
- Cyriac – Sivasspor 2017–19
- Simon Deli – Adana Demirspor, İstanbulspor 2021–24
- **Ali Badra Diabaté** – **Samsunspor** 2025–
- **Ibrahim Diabate** – **Erzurumspor** 2026–
- Serge Dié – Kayseri Erciyesspor 2005–07
- **Mohamed Diomande** – **Çorum** 2026–
- Brice Dja Djédjé – MKE Ankaragücü, Kayserispor 2018–20
- Serge Djiehoua – Antalyaspor 2008–11
- Ismaël Diomandé – Çaykur Rizespor, Konyaspor 2019–21
- Marius Trésor Doh – Fatih Karagümrük 2025–26
- Idrissa Doumbia – Alanyaspor 2022–23
- Didier Drogba – Galatasaray 2013–14
- Jean-Armel Drolé – Antalyaspor 2017
- Emmanuel Eboué – Galatasaray 2011–14
- David Datro Fofana – Göztepe, Fatih Karagümrük 2024–26
- Moryké Fofana – Konyaspor, Yeni Malatyaspor, Samsunspor 2016–21, 2023–24
- **Yahia Fofana** – **Çaykur Rizespor** 2025–
- Jean-Philippe Gbamin – Trabzonspor 2022–23
- Gervinho – Trabzonspor 2021–22
- Jean-Jacques Gosso – Orduspor, Mersin İdmanyurdu, Gençlerbirliği SK 2011–15
- Max Gradel – Sivasspor, Gaziantep 2020–24
- Christ Inao Oulaï – Trabzonspor 2025–26
- Wilfried Kanga – Kayserispor 2020–21
- Kader Keïta – Galatasaray 2009–10
- Kader Keïta – Sivasspor 2022–24
- Abdul Kader Moussa Koné – Fatih Karagümrük 2025–26
- Arouna Koné – Sivasspor 2017–22
- Moussa Koné – BB Erzurumspor 2018–19
- Jean Evrard Kouassi – Trabzonspor, Fatih Karagümrük 2021–23
- **Alban Lafont** – **Amedspor** 2026–
- **Ulrich Meleke** – **Gaziantep** 2026–
- Anderson Niangbo – Konyaspor 2023–24
- **Christopher Opéri** – **İstanbul Başakşehir** 2024–
- **Kassoum Ouattara** – **Beşiktaş** 2026–
- Nicolas Pépé – Trabzonspor 2023–24
- **Christ Sadia** – **Eyüpspor** 2025–
- Jean Seri – Galatasaray 2019–20
- **Wilfried Singo** – **Galatasaray** 2025–
- Giovanni Sio – Gençlerbirliği 2019–21
- Ibrahim Sissoko – Eskişehirspor, Konyaspor 2014–16
- **Abakar Sylla** – **Gaziantep** 2026–
- Trazié Thomas – Kasımpaşa 2023–24
- Adama Traoré – Göztepe 2017–19
- Ahmed Traoré – Fatih Karagümrük 2025–26
- Djakaridja Traoré – İstanbulspor 2023–24
- Ousmane Viera – Çaykur Rizespor, Adanaspor 2013–17
- Wilfried Zaha – Galatasaray 2023–24
- Didier Zokora – Trabzonspor, Akhisar Belediyespor 2011–15

== Croatia ==
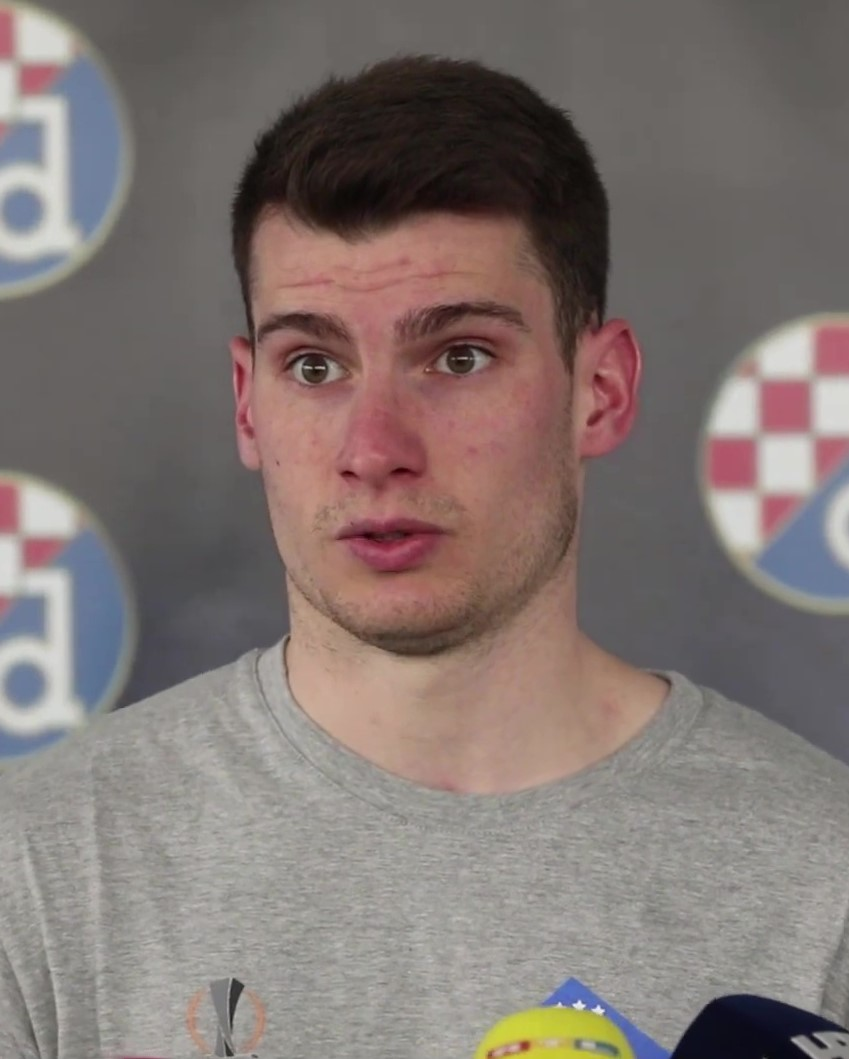
Dominik Livaković

- Borna Barišić – Trabzonspor 2024–25
- Filip Benković – Trabzonspor 2023–24
- Kristijan Bistrović – Kasımpaşa, Fatih Karagümrük 2020–22
- **Toni Borevković** – **Samsunspor** 2025–
- Josip Brekalo – Kasımpaşa 2024–25
- **Ivan Brnić** – **İstanbul Başakşehir** 2024–
- Josip Bulat – Bursaspor 2002–03
- Mijo Caktaš – Sivasspor 2023–24
- Hrvoje Čale – Trabzonspor 2008–11
- **Josip Ćalušić** – **Konyaspor** 2024–
- Damjan Đoković – Çaykur Rizespor, İstanbul Başakşehir 2020–22
- Josip Duvančić – İzmirspor 1966–67
- Tomislav Erceg – Kocaelispor 2001
- Petar Filipović – Konyaspor 2017–19
- Antonio Franja – Bursaspor 2002–03
- Drago Gabrić – Trabzonspor 2009–10, MKE Ankaragücü 2010–11
- Igor Gal – Çaykur Rizespor 2007–08
- Tomislav Glumac – Balıkesirspor, Ümraniyespor 2015, 2022–23
- Ivo Grbić – Çaykur Rizespor, Fatih Karagümrük 2024–26
- Vanja Iveša – Eskişehirspor 2008–12, Elazığspor 2012–14
- Elvis Kokalović – Konyaspor 2013–15
- Ante Kulušić – Hacettepe 2009, Gençlerbirliği 2010–14, 2015–17, Balıkesirspor 2014–15
- Jerko Leko – Bucaspor 2010–11
- **Dominik Livaković** – **Fenerbahçe** 2023–
- Krunoslav Lovrek – Eskişehirspor 2008–09
- Anton Maglica – Kayserispor 2020–21
- **Matej Maglica** – **Kocaelispor** 2026–
- Dario Melnjak – Çaykur Rizespor 2019–21
- Matej Mitrović – Beşiktaş 2017–18
- Marijan Mrmić – Beşiktaş 1996–98
- Antonio Mršić – Ümraniyespor 2022–23
- Karlo Muhar – Kayserispor 2020–21
- Robert Murić – Konyaspor 2022–24
- **Matija Orbanić** – **Erzurumspor** 2026–
- Mislav Oršić – Trabzonspor 2023–25
- Domagoj Pavičić – Konyaspor 2022–23
- Stipe Perica – Kasımpaşa 2018–19
- **Bruno Petković** – **Kocaelispor** 2025–
- Stjepan Poljak – Eskişehirspor 2008–09
- Srebrenko Posavec – MKE Ankaragücü 2006–07
- Niko Rak – Konyaspor 2022–24
- Milan Rapaić – Fenerbahçe 2000–03
- Ante Rebić – Beşiktaş 2023–24
- Vedran Runje – Beşiktaş 2006–07
- Gordon Schildenfeld – Beşiktaş 2008
- Zvonimir Šarlija – Kasımpaşa, MKE Ankaragücü 2019–21
- Anthony Šerić – Beşiktaş, Karabükspor 2007–08, 2010–13
- Mario Šitum – Kayserispor 2019–20
- **Hrvoje Smolčić** – Kocaelispor, **Çorum** 2025–
- Hrvoje Spahija – Elazığspor 2012–13
- Robert Špehar – Galatasaray 2001–02
- Dragan Talajić – Zeytinburnuspor 1994–95
- Tonio Teklić – Trabzonspor, Fatih Karagümrük 2023–24
- Stjepan Tomas – Fenerbahçe, Galatasaray, Gaziantepspor, Bucaspor 2003–07, 2009–11
- Vjekoslav Tomić – Karabükspor 2010–13
- Domagoj Vida – Beşiktaş – 2017–22
- Jurica Vranješ – Gençlerbirliği 2010
- Luka Vučko – Eskişehirspor 2008–11
- Davor Vugrinec – Trabzonspor 1997–00
- Andrija Vuković – Balıkesirspor 2015
- Josip Vuković – Pendikspor 2023–24
- Nikola Žižić – Antalyaspor 2012–13

== Curaçao ==
- **Juninho Bacuna** – **Gaziantep** 2025–
- **Riechedly Bazoer** – **Konyaspor** 2024–
- Joshua Brenet – Kayserispor 2025–26
- Sherel Floranus – Antalyaspor 2021–23
- **Sontje Hansen** – **Gaziantep** 2026–
- Brandley Kuwas – Giresunspor 2022–23

== Cyprus ==
- Dossa Júnior – Konyaspor, Eskişehirspor 2015–16

== Czech Republic ==
- Tomáš Abrahám – Denizlispor 2005–09
- Antonín Barák – Kasımpaşa 2024–25
- Milan Baroš – Galatasaray 2008–13, Antalyaspor 2013
- David Bičík – Mersin İdmanyurdu 2013
- Roman Bednář – MKE Ankaragücü 2011
- Jakub Brabec – Çaykur Rizespor 2018–19
- Tomáš Břečka – Kasımpaşa 2019–22
- Jaroslav Černý – MKE Ankaragücü 2011
- Tomáš Borek – Konyaspor 2013–14
- Erich Brabec – Konyaspor, Ankaraspor, MKE Ankaragücü 2004–05, 2008–10
- Ondřej Čelůstka – Trabzonspor, Antalyaspor, Bodrum 2011–13, 2015–20, 2024–25
- Milan Černý – Sivasspor 2011–12
- **Václav Černý** – **Beşiktaş** 2025–
- Tomáš Čvančara – Antalyaspor 2025–26
- Bořek Dočkal – Konyaspor 2010–11
- Radek Dosoudil – Denizlispor 2005
- Josef Dvorník – Manisaspor 2007–08
- Matěj Hanousek – Gaziantep, MKE Ankaragücü, Gençlerbirliği 2022–24, 2025–26
- Marek Heinz – Galatasaray 2005–06
- Jiří Homola – Malatyaspor 2005–06
- Martin Horák – Denizlispor 2005
- Pavel Horváth – Galatasaray 2001–02
- Petr Janda – Antalyaspor 2012–13
- Rostislav Jeřábek – Adanaspor, Konyaspor 1990–93
- Petr Johana – Manisaspor 2005–06
- Tomáš Jun – Trabzonspor, Beşiktaş 2004–06
- David Jurásek – Beşiktaş 2025–26
- Václav Jurečka – Çaykur Rizespor 2024–26
- Michal Kadlec – Fenerbahçe 2013–16
- Martin Klein – Konyaspor 2010–11
- Daniel Kolář – Gaziantepspor 2016–17
- Roman Květ – Sivasspor 2023–24
- Jiří Mašek – MKE Ankaragücü 2007–08
- Michal Meduna – Manisaspor 2005–07
- Tomáš Michálek – Malatyaspor 2006
- Jakub Navrátil – Sivasspor 2011–14
- Tomáš Necid – Bursaspor 2015–17, 2018–19
- Filip Novák – Trabzonspor, Fenerbahçe 2017–22
- David Pavelka – Kasımpaşa 2015–21
- Tomáš Pekhart – Gaziantep 2022–23
- Tomáš Pešír – Kayserispor 2005
- Adam Petrouš – Ankaraspor 2006–07
- Václav Procházka – Osmanlıspor 2016–18
- Karel Rada – Trabzonspor 1997–98
- Tomáš Rada – Sivasspor 2011–12
- Jan Rajnoch – MKE Ankaragücü, Sivasspor 2010–11, 2012–13
- František Rajtoral – Gaziantepspor 2016–17
- Zdeněk Šenkeřík – Malatyaspor 2006–07
- Tomáš Sivok – Beşiktaş, Bursaspor 2008–17
- Milan Škoda – Çaykur Rizespor 2019–21
- Josef Šural – Alanyaspor 2018–19
- Michal Trávník – Kasımpaşa 2021–22
- Tomáš Ujfaluši – Galatasaray 2011–13
- Ondřej Vaněk – Kayserispor 2014
- Tomáš Zápotočný – Beşiktaş, Bursaspor, Beşiktaş 2008–11
- Luděk Zdráhal – Göztepe 1999–2000
- Lukáš Zelenka – Manisaspor 2005–08
- Zdeněk Zlámal – Alanyaspor 2016–17

== Democratic Republic of the Congo ==
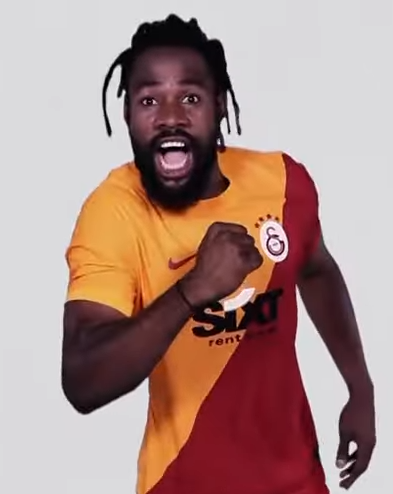
Christian Luyindama

- Benik Afobe – Trabzonspor 2020–21
- Britt Assombalonga – Adana Demirspor, Antalyaspor 2021–24
- Cédric Bakambu – Bursaspor, Galatasaray 2014–15, 2023–24
- Musemestre Bamba – Denizlispor 1994–95
- Simon Banza – Trabzonspor 2024–25
- Samuel Bastien – Kasımpaşa 2023–24
- Jeremy Bokila – Eskişehirspor 2016
- Yannick Bolasie – Çaykur Rizespor 2021–23
- Jonathan Bolingi – MKE Ankaragücü 2020–21
- Théo Bongonda – Trabzonspor – 2017–18
- Walter Bwalya – Yeni Malatyaspor 2021–22
- Nill De Pauw – Çaykur Rizespor 2019–20
- **Meschak Elia** – **Alanyaspor** 2025–
- Hervé Kage – Karabükspor 2017–18
- N'Dayi Kalenga (born 1967) – MKE Ankaragücü, Altay 1994–98
- N'Dayi Kalenga (born 1978) – Kayserispor, Kardemir Karabükspor, Göztepe 1997–99, 2002–03
- Bunene Ngaduane – MKE Ankaragücü 1995–96
- Andre Kona – Gençlerbirliği, Antalyaspor, Diyarbakırspor, İstanbulspor 1993–2003
- Domi Kumbela – Karabükspor 2014–15
- Jason Lokilo – İstanbulspor 2022–23
- Lomana LuaLua – Karabükspor, Çaykur Rizespor, Akhisar Belediyespor 2012–13, 2014–16
- Jody Lukoki – Yeni Malatyaspor 2020–21
- Ali Lukunku – Galatasaray 2002–04
- Arnaud Lusamba – Alanyaspor, Pendikspor 2022–24
- Christian Luyindama – Galatasaray, Antalyaspor 2018–23
- Larrys Mabiala – Karabükspor, Kayserispor 2012–17
- Cédric Makiadi – Çaykur Rizespor 2015–16
- Harrison Manzala – Kayserispor 2020–21
- **Arthur Masuaku** – Beşiktaş, **Konyaspor** 2022–25, 2026–
- Nsumbu Mazuwa – Kocaelispor, İstanbul Büyükşehir Belediyespor 2008–09, 2009–11
- **Salem M'Bakata** – **Gaziantep** 2023–
- Marcel Mbayo – Gençlerbirliği, Malatyaspor 2000–04
- Wilfred Moke – Konyaspor, MKE Ankaragücü 2017–20
- Cédric Mongongu – Eskişehirspor – 2015
- Samuel Moutoussamy – Sivasspor 2024–25
- Paul-José M'Poku – Konyaspor 2021–22
- **Jackson Muleka** – Kasımpaşa, Beşiktaş, **Konyaspor** 2021–
- Landry Mulemo – Bucaspor – 2010–11
- Joachim Mununga – Gençlerbirliği 2011–12
- Fabrice N'Sakala – Alanyaspor, Beşiktaş 2016–22
- Dieumerci Ndongala – Kasımpaşa 2019–20
- Shabani Nonda – Galatasaray 2007–10
- Jonathan Okita – Bodrum 2024–25
- Marcel Tisserand – Fenerbahçe 2020–22
- Nzuzi Toko – Eskişehirspor 2015

== Denmark ==
- Jens Berthel Askou – Kasımpaşa 2007–09
- Oğuz Han Aynaoğlu – Bursaspor, Çaykur Rizespor 2013–14, 2016–17
- Andreas Cornelius – Trabzonspor 2021–23
- Thomas Dalgaard – Manisaspor 2007–08
- Jes Høgh – Fenerbahçe 1995–99
- **Casper Højer** – **Çaykur Rizespor** 2023–
- Carlo Holse – Samsunspor 2023–26
- Elias Jelert – Galatasaray 2024–25
- David Jensen – İstanbulspor 2022–24
- **Jakob Jessen** – **Kasımpaşa** 2026–
- Jens Jønsson – Konyaspor 2016–20
- Mathias Jørgensen – Fenerbahçe 2019–20
- Nicolai Jørgensen – Kasımpaşa 2021–22
- Gökcan Kaya – Pendikspor 2023–24
- Christian Keller – Kasımpaşa 2009–11
- Peter Kjaer – Beşiktaş 2001
- Simon Kjær – Fenerbahçe 2015–17
- Andreas Maxsø – Osmanlispor 2017–18
- Victor Nelsson – Galatasaray 2021–25
- Henrik Nielsen – Fenerbahçe 1989–90
- John Nielsen – Göztepe 1969–71
- Lasse Nielsen – Göztepe 2024–25
- Brian Steen Nielsen – Fenerbahçe 1993–95
- **Andreas Skov Olsen** – **İstanbul Başakşehir** 2026–
- Lars Olsen – Trabzonspor 1991–92
- Frank Pingel – Bursaspor, Fenerbahçe 1993–95
- Louka Prip – Konyaspor 2023–25
- Mikkel Rask – Diyarbakırspor 2009–10
- Morten Rasmussen – Sivasspor 2011–12
- Pione Sisto – Alanyaspor 2023–24
- Martin Spelmann – Gençlerbirliği 2015–16
- Jens Stryger Larsen – Trabzonspor 2022–24

== Ecuador ==
- Rorys Aragón Espinoza – Diyarbakırspor 2009–10
- Keny Arroyo – Beşiktaş 2024–25
- Jordy Caicedo – Sivasspor 2022–23
- Jhon Espinoza – Kasımpaşa 2024–26
- Arturo Mina – Yeni Malatyaspor, BB Erzurumspor 2017–21
- Stiven Plaza – Trabzonspor 2020–21
- Jackson Porozo – Kasımpaşa 2023–24
- Enner Valencia – Fenerbahçe 2020–23

== Egypt ==
- Ayman Abdel-Aziz – Kocaelispor, Malatyaspor, Gençlerbirliği, Trabzonspor, Konyaspor, Diyarbakırspor 2000–04, 2005–06, 2007–10
- Hossam Abdelmoneim – Kocaelispor 1999–2000
- Abdel El Saka – Denizlispor, Gençlerbirliği, Konyaspor, Gençlerbirliği, Eskişehirspor 1999–2008, 2009–10
- Besheer El-Tabei – Çaykur Rizespor 2005–07
- Mohamed Elneny – Beşiktaş 2019–20
- Karim Hafez – Kasımpaşa, Yeni Malatyaspor 2018–22
- Ahmed Hassan – Kocaelispor, Denizlispor, Gençlerbirliği, Beşiktaş 1998–2005
- Samir Kamouna – Bursaspor 1999–2001
- Kahraba – Hatayspor 2021–22
- Kouka – Konyaspor, Alanyaspor, Pendikspor 2021–24
- Sayed Moawad – Trabzonspor 2007–08
- **Mostafa Mohamed** – Galatasaray, **Konyaspor** 2020–22, 2026–
- Effat Nssar – Siirtspor 2000–01
- Ramadan Ragap – Ankaragücü, İstanbulspor A.Ş. 2003-05
- Ahmed Yasser Rayyan – Altay 2021–22
- Ibrahim Said – Çaykur Rizespor, Ankaragücü 2006–08
- **Mohamed Salah** – **Trabzonspor** 2026–
- Mohamed Shawky – Kayserispor 2009–10
- Trezeguet – Kasımpaşa, İstanbul Başakşehir, Trabzonspor 2017–19, 2021–25
- Amr Zaki – Elazığspor 2012–13

== England ==
- Tammy Abraham – Beşiktaş 2025–26
- Dele Alli – Beşiktaş 2022–23
- **Tino Anjorin** – **Göztepe** 2026–
- Dalian Atkinson – Fenerbahçe 1995–96
- Lewis Baker – Trabzonspor 2020–21
- Marc Bola – Samsunspor 2023–25
- **Archie Brown** – **Fenerbahçe** 2025–
- Kevin Campbell – Trabzonspor 1998–99
- Scott Carson – Bursaspor 2011–13
- Danny Drinkwater – Kasımpaşa 2020–21
- Demeaco Duhaney – İstanbulspor 2022–24
- Anton Ferdinand – Bursaspor, Antalyaspor 2012–14
- Les Ferdinand – Beşiktaş 1988–89
- **Mason Greenwood** – **Fenerbahçe** 2026–
- Ian Henderson – MKE Ankaragücü 2009–10
- Cameron Jerome – Göztepe 2018–20
- Jake Jervis – Elazığspor 2012–13
- Jadel Katongo – Kayserispor 2025–26
- Ryan Kent – Fenerbahçe 2023–24
- Aaron Lennon – Kayserispor 2020–21
- **John Lundstram** – **Trabzonspor** 2024–
- Mike Marsh – Galatasaray 1995
- Sam Mather – Kayserispor 2025–26
- **Alex Matos** – **Göztepe** 2026–
- Rob McDonald – Beşiktaş 1989
- Luke Moore – Elazığspor 2013–14
- Richard Offiong – İstanbulspor 2004
- Alex Oxlade-Chamberlain – Beşiktaş 2023–25
- Erhun Oztumer – Fatih Karagümrük, Adana Demirspor 2021–23
- Alex Pritchard – Sivasspor 2024–25
- Nathan Redmond – Beşiktaş 2022–23
- Jonjo Shelvey – Çaykur Rizespor, Eyüpspor 2023–25
- Daniel Sturridge – Trabzonspor 2019–20
- Andros Townsend – Antalyaspor 2024–25
- Darius Vassell – MKE Ankaragücü 2009–10
- Barry Venison – Galatasaray 1995
- Alan Walsh – Beşiktaş 1989–91
- Joe Worrall – Beşiktaş 2023–24

== Equatorial Guinea ==
- Thierry Fidjeu Tazemeta – Diyarbakırspor, Konyaspor 2009–11

== Estonia ==
- Pavel Londak – Bucaspor 2010–11

== Ethiopia ==
- Walid Atta – Gençlerbirliği – 2015–16
- Yilma Ketema – Galatasaray – 1965–1967

== Finland ==
- Atik Ismail – Beşiktaş 1978–79
- Petteri Forsell – Bursaspor 2012–13
- Petri Helin – Denizlispor – 2001–02
- Janne Hietanen – Denizlispor 2002–04
- Janne-Pekka Laine – Çaykur Rizespor 2023–24
- Tommy Lindholm – Beşiktaş 1971–72
- Timo Marjamaa – Yimpaş Yozgatspor – 2001–02
- Miikka Multaharju – Denizlispor 2004–05
- Jussi Nuorela – Elazığspor 2003–04
- Joel Pohjanpalo – Çaykur Rizespor 2021–22
- Antti Sumiala – Yozgatspor, Akçaabat Sebatspor 2001–02, 2003–04

== France ==
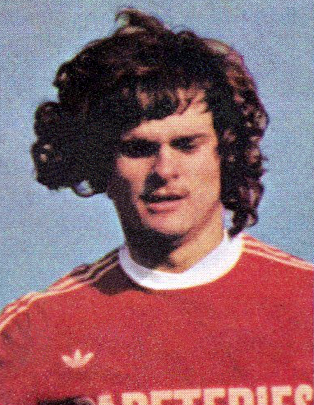
Didier Six

- Rayane Aabid – Hatayspor, Yeni Malatyaspor, Kasımpaşa 2020–24
- Kodjo Afanou – Gaziantepspor 2007–09
- Nabil Alioui – Adana Demirspor 2023–25
- Nicolas Anelka – Fenerbahçe 2005–06
- **Zakaria Ariss** – **Çaykur Rizespor** 2026–
- **Florian Ayé** – **Kocaelispor** 2026–
- Ibrahim Ba – Çaykur Rizespor 2006–07
- Claude Bakadal – Diyarbakırspor, Akçaabat Sebatspor 2003–05
- **Siaka Bakayoko** – **Çaykur Rizespor** 2026–
- Paul Bernardoni – Konyaspor 2023–24
- Sacha Boey – Galatasaray 2021–24, 2025–26
- Stéphane Borbiconi – Manisaspor 2006–09
- Mehdi Boudjemaa – Hatayspor 2021–24
- **Bilal Boutobba** – Hatayspor, **Eyüpspor** 2024–25, 2026–
- Lionel Carole – Galatasaray, Kayserispor 2015–17, 2021–26
- Cédric Carrasso – Galatasaray 2017–18
- Teddy Chevalier – Çaykur Rizespor 2013–16
- Mohammed Lamine Cisse – Konyaspor 2007–08
- Édouard Cissé – Beşiktaş 2007
- Aly Cissokho – Yeni Malatyaspor, Antalyaspor 2017–19
- Gaël Clichy – İstanbul Başakşehir 2017–20
- Charles-Édouard Coridon – MKE Ankaragücü 2005–06
- **Tanguy Coulibaly** – **Samsunspor** 2025–
- Enzo Crivelli – İstanbul Başakşehir, Antalyaspor 2019–22
- Wilfried Dalmat – Orduspor 2011–12
- Quentin Daubin – Gaziantep 2024–25
- Oumar Dieng – Çaykur Rizespor, Trabzonspor, Konyaspor 2000–04
- **Jean-Luc Dompé** – **Konyaspor** 2026–
- Léo Dubois – Galatasaray, İstanbul Başakşehir, Eyüpspor 2022–25
- Jirès Kembo Ekoko – Bursaspor 2017–19
- Julien Escudé – Beşiktaş 2012–14
- Valentin Eysseric – Kasımpaşa, Fatih Karagümrük 2021–24
- Julien Faubert – Elazığspor 2012–13
- Jean-Michel Ferri – İstanbulspor 1998
- Alexis Flips – MKE Ankaragücü 2023–24
- Breyton Fougeu – Adana Demirspor 2023–25
- Sébastien Frey – Bursaspor 2013–14
- Bafétimbi Gomis – Galatasaray 2017–19, 2021–23
- Iron Gomis – Kasımpaşa 2023–24
- Prince-Désir Gouano – Gaziantepspor 2016
- Yoan Gouffran – Göztepe 2017–19
- **Mattéo Guendouzi** – **Fenerbahçe** 2025–
- Christophe Hérelle – Bodrum 2024–25
- Thomas Heurtaux – Ankaragücü 2018–19
- Selim Ilgaz – Hatayspor 2020–21
- Nicolas Isimat-Mirin – Beşiktaş 2018–19
- **Tim Jabol-Folcarelli** – **Trabzonspor** 2024–
- **Nicolas Janvier** – **Alanyaspor** 2023–
- Yannick Kamanan – Sivasspor, Mersin İdmanyurdu 2009–12
- **N'Golo Kanté** – **Fenerbahçe** 2025–
- Yann Karamoh – Fatih Karagümrük 2021–22
- Hamidou Keyta – Konyaspor 2024–25
- Gaëtan Laura – Samsunspor 2023–25
- Kévin Malcuit – MKE Ankaragücü 2022–23
- Florent Malouda – Trabzonspor 2013–14
- Cyril Mandouki – Gaziantep 2024–25
- **Batista Mendy** – **Trabzonspor** 2023–
- Jérémy Ménez – Antalyaspor 2017–18
- Édouard Michut – Adana Demirspor 2023–25
- **Kévin Mouanga** – **Kasımpaşa** 2026–
- Thibault Moulin – Ankaragücü 2018–19
- Rashad Muhammed – BB Erzurumspor 2018–21
- Samir Nasri – Antalyaspor 2017–18
- Tanguy Ndombele – Galatasaray 2023–24
- Axel Ngando – Göztepe 2017–19
- Michaël Niçoise – Gençlerbirliği 2005–07
- Pascal Nouma – Beşiktaş 2000–01, 2002–03
- Steven Nzonzi – Galatasaray, Konyaspor 2019–20, 2023–24
- Gabriel Obertan – BB Erzurumspor – 2018–19
- Kamal Ouejdide – Göztepe 2002–03
- Jérémy Perbet – İstanbul Başakşehir 2014–15
- Sébastien Pérez – Galatasaray 2001–02
- Michaël Pereira – Yeni Malatyaspor 2017–19
- Mathieu Peybernes – Göztepe 2017–18
- **Lenny Pintor** – **Eyüpspor** 2025–
- Pierre-Yves Polomat – Gençlerbirliği 2019–21
- Benoît Poulain – Kayserispor 2019–20
- Grégory Proment – Antalyaspor 2010
- Sébastien Puygrenier – Karabükspor 2013
- Adil Rami – Fenerbahçe 2019–20
- **Charles-André Raux-Yao** – **Eyüpspor** 2025–
- Loïc Rémy – Çaykur Rizespor, Adana Demirspor 2020–22
- Franck Ribéry – Galatasaray 2004–05
- Rémy Riou – Alanyaspor 2017–18
- Valentin Rosier – Beşiktaş 2020–24
- Jérôme Rothen – MKE Ankaragücü 2010
- Cédric Sabin – Konyaspor 2007–08
- Özcan Şahan – İstanbulspor 2023–24
- Allan Saint-Maximin – Fenerbahçe 2024–25
- Yannis Salibur – Fatih Karagümrük 2020–22
- Léo Schwechlen – Göztepe, BB Erzurumspor 2017–20
- Didier Six (Dündar Siz) – Galatasaray 1987–88
- Benjamin Stambouli – Adana Demirspor 2021–24
- Ludovic Sylvestre – Çaykur Rizespor 2013–16
- Flavien Tait – Samsunspor 2023–25
- Jonathan Téhoué – Kasımpaşa, Konyaspor 2007–09
- **Lesley Ugochukwu** – **Galatasaray** 2026–
- William Vainqueur – Antalyaspor 2017–18
- Mathieu Valbuena – Fenerbahçe 2017–19
- Olivier Veigneau – Kasımpaşa 2015–20
- Rémi Walter – Yeni Malatyaspor 2019–20
- **Tanguy Zoukrou** – **Kocaelispor** 2026–

== Gabon ==
- Jim Allevinah – Kasımpaşa 2025–26
- Aaron Appindangoyé – Sivasspor, Kocaelispor 2019–24, 2025–26
- Shavy Babicka – Fatih Karagümrük 2025–26
- André Biyogo Poko – Karabükspor, Göztepe, Altay 2016–22
- Aaron Boupendza – Hatayspor 2020–21
- Malick Evouna – Konyaspor 2017–18
- **Mario Lemina** – **Galatasaray** 2019–20, 2024–
- Bruno Zita Mbanangoyé – Sivasspor 2009–10
- Roguy Méyé – Ankaraspor, MKE Ankaragücü 2008–11
- Axel Méyé – Eskişehirspor 2015–16
- Didier Ndong – Yeni Malatyaspor 2021–22
- David Sambissa – İstanbulspor 2023–24

== Gambia ==
- Modou Barrow – Denizlispor, Sivasspor 2019–20, 2023–24
- **Ebrima Ceesay** – **Samsunspor** 2025–
- Jesper Ceesay – Antalyaspor 2025–26
- **Ebrima Colley** – Fatih Karagümrük, **Konyaspor** 2022–23, 2026–
- Omar Colley – Beşiktaş 2022–25
- Pa Dibba – Adana Demirspor 2021–22
- **Karamba Gassama** – **Gaziantep** 2025–
- **Saikuba Jarju** – **Samsunspor** 2026–
- Bubacarr Sanneh – Göztepe 2019–20
- Noah Sonko Sundberg – Sivasspor 2024–25
- **Ali Sowe** – MKE Ankaragücü, **Çaykur Rizespor** 2022–

== Georgia ==
- Giorgi Aburjania – Hatayspor 2023–24
- Aleksandr Amisulashvili – Kayserispor 2010–11
- Archil Arveladze – Trabzonspor 1993–97
- Shota Arveladze – Trabzonspor 1993–97
- Vato Arveladze – Fatih Karagümrük 2020–22
- Besik Beradze – Trabzonspor 1994
- Giorgi Beridze – MKE Ankaragücü 2022–24
- Giorgi Chelidze – Samsunspor 2009–10
- Lasha Dvali – Kasımpaşa 2015
- Nika Dzalamidze – Çaykur Rizespor 2015–16
- **Guram Giorbelidze** – **Erzurumspor** 2026–
- **Luka Gugeshashvili** – **Göztepe** 2026–
- Grigol Imedadze – Kocaelispor 2003
- Gocha Jamarauli – Trabzonspor 1997–98
- Kakhaber Kacharava – Trabzonspor 1994
- Revaz Kemoklidze – Kocaelispor 2003
- **Saba Kharebashvili** – **İstanbul Başakşehir** 2026–
- Zurab Khizanishvili – Kayserispor 2011–14
- Akaki Khubutia – Samsunspor 2011–12
- Giorgi Kiknadze – Samsunspor 1999–2000
- Saba Lobzhanidze – MKE Ankaragücü, Hatayspor, Fatih Karagümrük 2019–23
- Giorgi Nemsadze – Trabzonspor 1996–97
- Tornike Okriashvili – Eskişehirspor 2016
- Levan Shengelia – Konyaspor 2019–21
- Nikoloz Ugrekhelidze – Fatih Karagümrük 2025–26

== Germany ==
- Rüdiger Abramczik – Galatasaray 1984–85
- Atakan Akkaynak – Çaykur Rizespor 2019–20
- Raimond Aumann – Beşiktaş 1994–95
- Marvin Bakalorz – Denizlispor 2020–21
- **Makana Baku** – Göztepe, **Kocaelispor** 2021–22, 2026–
- Andreas Beck – Beşiktaş 2015–17
- Mërgim Berisha – Fenerbahçe 2021–23
- Thomas Berthold – Adanaspor 2000–01
- Alexander Blessin – Antalyaspor 2001–02
- Can Bozdogan – Beşiktaş 2021–22
- **Taylan Bulut** – **Beşiktaş** 2025–
- **Kerim Çalhanoğlu** – **Gaziantep** 2026–
- **Erdem Canpolat** – Kasımpaşa, Pendikspor, **Çaykur Rizespor** 2020–24, 2025–
- Şahverdi Çetin – MKE Ankaragücü 2020–23
- Yusuf Çoban – Antalyaspor 2017–18
- **Dilhan Demir** – **Gençlerbirliği** 2025–
- **Kerem Demirbay** – Galatasaray, Eyüpspor, **Kasımpaşa** 2023–
- Mustafa Doğan – Fenerbahçe, Beşiktaş 1996–2003, 2004–07
- Robert Enke – Fenerbahçe 2003–04
- Okan Erdoğan – İstanbulspor 2022–24
- Fabian Ernst – Beşiktaş, Kasımpaşa 2008–13
- Pierre Esser – Galatasaray 1997
- Malik Fathi – Kayserispor 2012–13
- Michael Fink – Beşiktaş, Samsunspor 2009–12
- Maurizio Gaudino – Antalyaspor 1999–2002
- Mario Gómez – Beşiktaş 2015–2016
- Falko Götz – Galatasaray 1992–94
- Jürgen Groh – Trabzonspor 1985
- **Gökhan Gül** – Kasımpaşa, **Amedspor** 2023–25, 2026–
- Semih Güler – Eskişehirspor, Adana Demirspor, Gaziantep, Kayserispor 2014–15, 2021–26
- Sinan Gümüş – Galatasaray, Antalyaspor, Fenerbahçe 2014–23
- **İlkay Gündoğan** – **Galatasaray** 2025–
- Koray Günter – Galatasaray, Fatih Karagümrük, Göztepe 2013–16, 2017–18, 2023–25
- Torsten Gütschow – Galatasaray 1993
- Stephan Hanke – Siirtspor 2000–01
- Dirk Hebel – Bursaspor 1997
- Dirk Heinen – Denizlispor 2002–03
- Thomas Hengen – Beşiktaş 1999
- Roberto Hilbert – Beşiktaş 2010–13
- Daniel Hoffmann – Kocaelispor 2000
- Gideon Jung – Kayserispor 2025–26
- Yusuf Kabadayı – Gaziantep 2025–26
- Loris Karius – Beşiktaş 2018–20
- **Fatih Kaya** – **Samsunspor** 2026–
- Erdal Kılıçaslan – Gençlerbirliği, Konyaspor, Mersin İdmanyurdu, Osmanlıspor 2006–12, 2013–14, 2015–17
- Süleyman Koç – Çaykur Rizespor 2017–19
- Derrick Köhn – Galatasaray 2023–25
- Michael Kraft – Bakırköyspor 1990–93
- Max Kruse – Fenerbahçe 2019–20
- Stefan Kuntz – Beşiktaş 1995–96
- Alexander Löbe – Erzurumspor, Trabzonspor, Malatyaspor 1999–2002
- Marko Marin – Trabzonspor 2015–16
- Oğuzhan Matur – Hatayspor 2023–25
- **Levent Mercan** – Fatih Karagümrük, **Fenerbahçe** 2021–
- Max Meyer – Fenerbahçe 2021–22
- **Youssoufa Moukoko** – **Çorum** 2026–
- Detlef Müller (Metin Mert) – Sarıyer, Trabzonspor, Kocaelispor, Konyaspor, Antalyaspor 1990–2003
- Markus Münch – Beşiktaş 1999–2001
- Deniz Naki – Gençlerbirliği 2013–14
- Markus Neumayr – Kasımpaşa 2017–18
- Tobias Nickenig – Orduspor 2011–12
- **Alexander Nübel** – **Beşiktaş** 2026–
- Aaron Opoku – Kayserispor 2025–26
- Barış Özbek – Galatasaray, Trabzonspor, Kayserispor 2007–12, 2015–16
- Mesut Özil – Fenerbahçe, İstanbul Başakşehir 2020–23
- Jürgen Pahl – Çaykur Rizespor 1987–89
- Lukas Podolski – Galatasaray 2015–17
- Alessandro Riedle – Akhisar Belediyespor 2013–14
- Görkem Sağlam – Giresunspor, Hatayspor 2022–25
- Sidney Sam – Antalyaspor 2020–21
- **Leroy Sané** – **Galatasaray** 2025–
- Oliver Schäfer – Beşiktaş 1999–2000
- Sven Scheuer – Adanaspor 2000–01
- Toni Schumacher – Fenerbahçe 1988–91
- Dirk Schuster – Antalyaspor 1999–2000
- **Davie Selke** – **İstanbul Başakşehir** 2025–
- Martin Spanring – Bursaspor 2000
- Reinhard Stumpf – Galatasaray 1992–94
- Serdar Tasci – İstanbul Başakşehir 2018–19
- Selim Teber – Denizlispor, Kayserispor, Samsunspor, Karabükspor 2005–06, 2010–13
- Lennart Thy – Erzurumspor 2018–19
- **Felix Uduokhai** – **Beşiktaş** 2024–
- Sixten Veit – Beşiktaş 2001
- Andreas Wagenhaus – Fenerbahçe 1993–94
- Dominik Werling – Sakaryaspor 2007
- Robin Yalçın – Çaykur Rizespor, Yeni Malatyaspor, Sivasspor, Eyüpspor 2015–21, 2022–23, 2024–26
- Erdoğan Yeşilyurt – Sivasspor, Antalyaspor 2018–26
- Ersin Zehir – Antalyaspor 2021–22
- Marc Ziegler – Bursaspor 2000

== Ghana ==
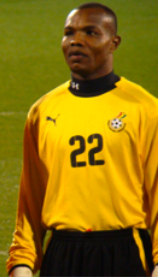
Richard Kingston

- Yaw Ackah – Kayserispor, BB Erzurumspor 2020–21, 2022–26
- Afriyie Acquah – Yeni Malatyaspor 2019–21
- Daniel Addo – Gençlerbirliği, Hacettepe 2008–10
- Enoch Kofi Adu – Akhisar Belediyespor 2017–18
- **Dan Agyei** – **Kocaelispor** 2025–
- Joseph Akomadi – Hatayspor 2020–21
- Kofi Amoako Atta – Bursaspor 2017–18
- **Prince Ampem** – **Eyüpspor** 2024–
- Joseph Larweh Attamah – İstanbul Başakşehir, Çaykur Rizespor, Kayserispor 2016–25
- Emmanuel Agyemang-Badu – Bursaspor 2017–18
- Augustine Ahinful – MKE Ankaragücü, Trabzonspor 2000–08
- Jerry Akaminko – Manisaspor, Eskişehirspor 2011–16
- Daniel Amartey – Beşiktaş 2023–24
- Joseph Amoah – MKE Ankaragücü, Göztepe 2001–03
- Matthew Amoah – Mersin İdmanyurdu 2011–12
- Stephen Appiah – Fenerbahçe 2005–07
- Christian Atsu – Hatayspor 2022–23
- Philip Awuku – Yeni Malatyaspor 2021–23
- André Ayew – Fenerbahçe 2018–19
- Kwame Ayew – Yozgatspor, Kocaelispor 2000–02
- Stephen Baidoo – MKE Ankaragücü, Samsunspor 1996–2005
- Ahmed Barusso – Galatasaray 2007–08
- James Boadu – Gençlerbirliği, Hacettepe 2007–09
- Emmanuel Boateng – Konyaspor 2023–25
- Emmanuel Boateng – Gaziantep 2024–26
- Kevin-Prince Boateng – Beşiktaş 2019–20
- John Boye – Kayseri Erciyesspor, Sivasspor 2014–16
- Raman Chibsah – Gaziantep 2019–20
- Isaac Cofie – Sivasspor 2019–23
- Kofi Deblah – Diyarbakırspor 2002
- Alexander Djiku – Fenerbahçe 2023–26
- Godfred Donsah – Çaykur Rizespor, Yeni Malatyaspor 2020–23
- Emmanuel Duah – Adana Demirspor, Eskişehirspor 1994–96
- Caleb Ekuban – Trabzonspor 2018–21
- Mohammed Fatau – Gaziantepspor 2016–17
- Asamoah Gyan – Kayserispor 2017–19
- Samuel Inkoom – Antalyaspor 2016–17
- Kamal Issah – Gençlerbirliği, Eskişehirspor 2016–19
- Samuel Johnson – Fenerbahçe, Kayserispor 1999–2006
- Ohene Kennedy – MKE Ankaragücü 1997–2002
- Richard Kingson (Faruk Gürsoy) – Sakaryaspor, Göztepe, Antalyaspor, Elazığspor, Galatasaray, Ankaraspor 1998–2000, 2002–03, 2004–05, 2006–07
- Gilbert Koomson – Kasımpaşa 2020–21
- Derrick Luckassen – Kasımpaşa, Fatih Karagümrük 2020–22
- Lumor – Göztepe 2018–19
- Elvis Manu – Gençlerbirliği, Akhisar Belediyespor 2017–19
- Bernard Mensah – Kasımpaşa, Kayserispor, Beşiktaş 2017–23
- Habib Mohamed – MKE Ankaragücü 2007
- Adamu Mohammed – Gençlerbirliği, Hacettepe 2008–09
- **Musah Mohammed** – Bodrum, **Göztepe** 2024–
- Sulley Muniru – Yeni Malatyaspor 2018–19
- Yevhen Opanasenko – Konyaspor 2018–19
- Daniel Opare – Beşiktaş 2015
- **Jerome Opoku** – **İstanbul Başakşehir** 2023–
- Nicholas Opoku – Kasımpaşa 2024–26
- Michael Osei – Vanspor 1997
- Haqi Osman – Yeni Malatyaspor, Bodrum 2021–23, 2024–25
- **Elisha Owusu** – **Erzurumspor** 2026–
- Raymond Owusu – İstanbulspor 2022–23
- Joseph Paintsil – MKE Ankaragücü 2020–21
- **Kojo Peprah Oppong** – **Fenerbahçe** 2026–
- Yaw Preko – Gaziantepspor, Fenerbahçe, Yozgatspor 1997–2004
- Isaac Sackey – Alanyaspor, Denizlispor, Hatayspor, Ümraniyespor 2016–23
- Kingsley Schindler – Samsunspor 2023–25
- Abdul Rahim Sebah – Kasımpaşa 2010–11
- **Jesurun Rak-Sakyi** – Çaykur Rizespor, **Kasımpaşa** 2025–
- Nuru Sulley – Alanyaspor 2016–17
- Prince Tagoe – Bursaspor 2011
- Abdul Aziz Tetteh – Gaziantep 2019–21
- Benjamin Tetteh – Yeni Malatyaspor 2020–22
- Emmanuel Tetteh – Vanspor, Trabzonspor, Bursaspor, Çaykur Rizespor 1999–2003
- Patrick Twumasi – Gaziantep 2019–20
- Abdul Majeed Waris – Trabzonspor 2014–15
- Shaibu Yakubu – Hacettepe 2008–09

== Greece ==
- Anastasios Bakasetas – Alanyaspor, Trabzonspor 2019–24
- Andreas Bouchalakis – Konyaspor 2022–23
- Charis Charisis – Sivasspor 2022–25
- Anastasios Chatzigiovanis – MKE Ankaragücü, Eyüpspor 2022–25
- Dimitrios Chatziisaias – Çaykur Rizespor 2019–21
- Sokratis Dioudis – Gaziantep 2024–26
- Taxiarchis Fountas – Trabzonspor 2023–24
- Theofanis Gekas – Akhisar Belediyespor, Konyaspor, Eskişehirspor 2013–16
- **Andreas Gianniotis** – **Kasımpaşa** 2023–
- **Dimitrios Goutas** – Sivasspor, **Gençlerbirliği** 2021–23, 2025–
- Alexandros Katranis – Hatayspor 2020–21
- Stelios Kitsiou – MKE Ankaragücü, Gaziantep 2019–24
- Dimitrios Kolovetsios – Kayserispor 2020–25
- Efthymis Koulouris – Alanyaspor 2022–23
- Dimitrios Kourbelis – Trabzonspor, Fatih Karagümrük 2023–24
- **Alexandros Kyziridis** – **Çorum** 2026–
- Giannis Maniatis – Alanyaspor 2017–19
- Kostas Mitroglou – Galatasaray 2018–19
- Avraam Papadopoulos – Trabzonspor 2014–15
- Giannis Papanikolaou – Çaykur Rizespor 2024–26
- Dimitrios Pelkas – Fenerbahçe, İstanbul Başakşehir 2020–22, 2023–25
- Achilleas Poungouras – Sivasspor 2023–25
- Manolis Siopis – Alanyaspor, Trabzonspor 2019–23
- Georgios Tzavellas – Alanyaspor, Pendikspor 2017–21, 2023–24
- Alexandros Tziolis – Kayserispor 2014

== Guadeloupe ==
- Andreaw Gravillon – Adana Demirspor 2023–25

== Guinea ==
- Ibrahima Bangoura – Denizlispor, Konyaspor 2009–11
- **Mohamed Bayo** – Gaziantep, **Samsunspor** 2025–
- Demba Camara – Gaziantepspor 2014–16
- **Sidiki Cherif** – **Fenerbahçe** 2025–
- **Amadou Cissé** – **Amedspor** 2026–
- Mohamed Cissé – Bursaspor 2007–08
- Kévin Constant – Trabzonspor 2014–15
- **Ousmane Diabaté** – **Gençlerbirliği** 2025–
- Mamadou Alimou Diallo – Sivasspor, Diyarbakırspor, Sivasspor 2007–10
- Sadio Diallo – Yeni Malatyaspor, Gençlerbirliği 2017–18, 2019–20
- Saliou Diallo – Yozgatspor 2000–01
- Kaba Diawara – Gaziantepspor 2006–08
- Simon Falette – Fenerbahçe – 2019–20
- Pascal Feindouno – Elazığspor 2012
- Daouda Jabi – Kayseri Erciyesspor, Trabzonspor 2005–08
- Julian Jeanvier – Kasımpaşa, Kayserispor – 2020–21, 2023–25
- Torric Jebrin – Bucaspor 2011
- Oumar Kalabane – Manisaspor 2007–11
- Bengali-Fodé Koita – Kasımpaşa, Trabzonspor, Sivasspor 2016–25
- Guy-Michel Landel – Gençlerbirliği, Alanyaspor 2015–18
- Ousmane N'Gom Camara – Konyaspor 2004–05
- Souleymane Oularé – Fenerbahçe 1999–2000
- Florentin Pogba – Gençlerbirliği 2017–18
- Kanfory Sylla – Sivasspor, İstanbul Büyükşehir Belediyespor, Konyaspor 2007–10
- Abdoulaye Touré – Fatih Karagümrük 2021–22
- Ibrahim Yattara – Trabzonspor, Mersin İdmanyurdu 2002–12
- Souleymane Youla – Gençlerbirliği, Beşiktaş, Eskişehirspor, Denizlispor, Orduspor 2003–06, 2008–11
- Kamil Zayatte – Konyaspor, İstanbul Büyükşehir Belediyespor 2011–13

== Guinea-Bissau ==
- Janio Bikel – Gaziantep 2023–24
- **Franculino Djú** – **Trabzonspor** 2026–
- Edgar Ié – Trabzonspor, İstanbul Başakşehir 2020–24
- Carlos Mané – Kayserispor 2021–26
- Nanu – Samsunspor 2023–25
- **Renato Nhaga** – **Galatasaray** 2025–
- Leocísio Sami – Akhisar Belediyespor 2015–17

== Haiti ==
- Wilde-Donald Guerrier – Alanyaspor 2016–17
- Duckens Nazon – Kayserispor 2023–25
- Frantzdy Pierrot – Çaykur Rizespor 2025–26

== Honduras ==
- Bryan Acosta – Gaziantep 2023–24
- Carlo Costly – Gaziantepspor 2014
- **Rigoberto Rivas** – Hatayspor, **Kocaelispor** 2023–
- Maynor Suazo – Antalyaspor 2006–09

== Hungary ==
- **Botond Balogh** – **Kocaelispor** 2025–
- Kevin Csoboth – Gençlerbirliği 2025–26
- Balázs Dzsudzsák – Bursaspor 2015–16
- Márkó Futács – Mersin İdmanyurdu 2014–16
- Péter Kabát – Göztepe, Denizlispor 2001–04
- Attila Kerekes – Bursaspor 1985–87
- Vladimir Koman – Adanaspor 2016–17
- László Kuti – Denizlispor 1985–86
- Joe Erwin Kuzman – Beşiktaş, Boluspor 1966–67, 1968–70
- Pál Lázár – Samsunspor 2011–12
- Balázs Megyeri – Göztepe 2020–21
- **Attila Mocsi** – **Çaykur Rizespor** 2023–
- Kenny Otigba – Kasımpaşa 2016–17
- Zsolt Petry – Gençlerbirliği 1995–96
- **Roland Sallai** – **Galatasaray** 2024–
- Bálint Szabó – Antalyaspor 2022–23
- Attila Szalai – Fenerbahçe, Kasımpaşa 2020–23, 2025–26
- Tibor Szalay – Beşiktaş 1966–67
- **Rajmund Tóth** – **Konyaspor** 2026–
- Mihály Tulipán – Bursaspor 1985–86
- József Varga – Denizlispor 1985–87
- Kevin Varga – Kasımpaşa, Hatayspor 2020–23

== Iceland ==
- **Andri Baldursson** – **Kasımpaşa** 2025–
- Birkir Bjarnason – Adana Demirspor 2021–23
- Atli Eðvaldsson – Gençlerbirliği 1989–90
- Viðar Örn Kjartansson – Yeni Malatyaspor 2019–20
- Rúnar Alex Rúnarsson – Alanyaspor 2022–23
- Eyjólfur Sverrisson – Beşiktaş 1994–95
- Grétar Steinsson – Kayserispor 2012
- Gunnar Heidar Thorvaldsson – Konyaspor 2013–14
- Ólafur Ingi Skúlason – Gençlerbirliği, Karabükspor 2016–18
- Kolbeinn Sigþórsson – Galatasaray 2016–17
- **Logi Tómasson** – **Samsunspor** 2025–

== Ireland ==
- **Sinclair Armstrong** – **Göztepe** 2026–
- **Festy Ebosele** – İstanbul Başakşehir, **Erzurumspor** 2024–
- Billy Mehmet – Gençlerbirliği, Samsunspor 2010–11

== Iran ==
- Vahid Amiri – Trabzonspor 2018–19
- Sohrab Bakhtiarizadeh – Erzurumspor 2000–01
- Ali Gholizadeh – Kasımpaşa 2022–23
- Majid Hosseini – Trabzonspor, Kayserispor 2018–26
- Ali Karimi – Kayserispor 2022–26
- Hamed Kavianpour – Kayserispor 2006
- Mohammad Khakpour – Vanspor 1997
- Milad Mohammadi – Adana Demirspor 2023–25
- Mohammad Momeni – Erzurumspor 2000–01
- Mohammad Naderi – Altay 2021–22
- Naser Sadeghi (Nasır Vanlıoğlu) – Galatasaray, Konyaspor 1987–88
- Payam Sadeghian – Osmanlıspor 2017–18
- Allahyar Sayyadmanesh – Fenerbahçe 2019–20
- Sajjad Shahbazzadeh – Alanyaspor 2016–17
- Reza Shahroudi – Altay 1998–99

== Iraq ==
- Bassim Abbas – Diyarbakırspor, Konyaspor 2009–11
- Ali Adnan – Çaykur Rizespor 2013–15
- Dhurgham Ismail – Çaykur Rizespor 2015–17
- Ali Faez – Çaykur Rizespor 2016–17
- Osama Rashid – Gaziantep – 2020–21
- Ahmed Yasin – Denizlispor 2020–21

== Israel ==
- Ronen Harazi – Bursaspor 1998–99
- Haim Revivo – Fenerbahçe, Galatasaray 2000–03
- Pini Balili – İstanbulspor, Kayserispor, Sivasspor, Antalyaspor 2003–10
- Ofir Haim – İstanbulspor 2004
- Eden Kartsev – İstanbul Başakşehir 2022–24
- **Dia Saba** – Sivasspor, **Amedspor** 2022–23, 2026–
- Ramzi Safouri – Antalyaspor 2023–26
- Salim Tuama – Kayserispor 2004
- Sagiv Yehezkel – Antalyaspor 2023–24

== Italy ==
- Mario Balotelli – Adana Demirspor 2021–24
- **Rayyan Baniya** – Fatih Karagümrük, Trabzonspor, **Konyaspor** 2021–24, 2025–
- Andrea Bertolacci – Fatih Karagümrük, Kayserispor 2020–24
- Davide Biraschi – Fatih Karagümrük 2021–24, 2025–26
- Leonardo Bonucci – Fenerbahçe 2023–24
- Fabio Borini – Fatih Karagümrük 2020–23
- Federico Ceccherini – Fatih Karagümrük 2023–24
- Alessio Cerci – MKE Ankaragücü 2018–19
- Morgan De Sanctis – Galatasaray 2008–09
- Matteo Ferrari – Beşiktaş 2009–11
- **Simone Giordano** – **Eyüpspor** 2026–
- Federico Giunti – Beşiktaş 2003–04
- **Gabriele Guarino** – **Samsunspor** 2026–
- Ciro Immobile – Beşiktaş 2024–25
- Kevin Lasagna – Fatih Karagümrük 2023–24
- Federico Macheda – MKE Ankaragücü 2022–24
- **Fabio Miretti** – **Beşiktaş** 2026–
- Stefano Napoleoni – İstanbul Başakşehir, Göztepe 2016–21
- Cher Ndour – Beşiktaş 2024–25
- Stefano Okaka – İstanbul Başakşehir 2021–23
- Flavio Paoletti – Fatih Karagümrük 2023–24
- João Pedro – Fenerbahçe 2022–23
- Raoul Petretta – Kasımpaşa – 2022–23
- Davide Petrucci – Çaykur Rizespor 2016–19
- Andrea Poli – Antalyaspor 2021–22
- Matteo Ricci – Fatih Karagümrük 2022–23
- Riccardo Saponara – MKE Ankaragücü 2023–24
- Simone Scuffet – Kasımpaşa 2018–19
- Salvatore Sirigu – Fatih Karagümrük 2023–24
- Stefano Sturaro – Fatih Karagümrük 2023–24
- **Franco Tongya** – **Gençlerbirliği** 2025–
- Daniele Verde – Fatih Karagümrük 2025–26
- Emiliano Viviano – Fatih Karagümrük 2020–23
- Nicolò Zaniolo – Galatasaray 2022–23, 2025–26

== Jamaica ==
- Renaldo Cephas – MKE Ankaragücü 2023–24
- Andre Gray – Fatih Karagümrük 2025–26
- Daniel Johnson – Fatih Karagümrük 2025–26
- Dever Orgill – MKE Ankaragücü, Antalyaspor 2019–21
- Luton Shelton – Karabükspor 2011–13
- **Trivante Stewart** – **Gaziantep** 2026–

== Japan ==
- Junichi Inamoto – Galatasaray 2006–07
- Hajime Hosogai – Bursaspor 2015–16
- Shinji Kagawa – Beşiktaş 2019
- Kuryu Matsuki – Göztepe 2024–25
- Yuto Nagatomo – Galatasaray 2018–20
- Shoya Nakajima – Antalyaspor 2022–23
- Takayuki Seto – Osmanlıspor 2015–16

== Jordan ==
- **Ibrahim Sabra** – **Göztepe** 2025–

== Kazakhstan ==
- Abat Aymbetov – Adana Demirspor 2023–25
- Alexander Merkel – Gaziantep 2021–23
- Evgeny Yarovenko – Sarıyer 1992–94
- Bakhtiyar Zaynutdinov – Beşiktaş 2023–25

== Kenya ==
- Johanna Omolo – BB Erzurumspor 2020–21

== Kosovo ==
- Arsim Abazi – Malatyaspor 2001–03
- **Fidan Aliti** – **Alanyaspor** 2023–
- Donis Avdijaj – Trabzonspor 2019–20
- Visar Bekaj – Hatayspor 2023–25
- Zymer Bytyqi – Konyaspor, Antalyaspor 2020–24
- Agim Cana – Gençlerbirliği, Samsunspor 1987–89
- Bersant Celina – Kasımpaşa 2022–23
- **Lumbardh Dellova** – **Amedspor** 2026–
- Ibrahim Drešević – Fatih Karagümrük 2022–24
- Fahrudin Durak – Galatasaray, Bursaspor 1992–93, 1995–97
- **Amar Gërxhaliu** – Antalyaspor, **Erzurumspor** 2022–25, 2026–
- **Florent Hadergjonaj** – Kasımpaşa, **Alanyaspor** 2018–
- **Ermal Krasniqi** – **Amedspor** 2026–
- Florian Loshaj – İstanbulspor 2022–24
- Alban Meha – Konyaspor 2015–17
- Arijanet Muric – Adana Demirspor 2021–22
- **Vedat Muriqi** – Gençlerbirliği, Çaykur Rizespor, **Fenerbahçe** 2016–20, 2026–
- Atdhe Nuhiu – Eskişehirspor 2012–13
- Xhevad Prekazi – Galatasaray, Altay, Bakırköyspor 1985–93
- Elbasan Rashani – BB Erzurumspor 2020–21
- **Milot Rashica** – Galatasaray, **Beşiktaş** 2022–
- Loret Sadiku – Mersin İdmanyurdu, Kasımpaşa 2014–22, 2023–25
- Herolind Shala – Kasımpaşa 2016–17
- Skënder Shengyli – Karşıyaka 1989–91
- Jetmir Topalli – Yeni Malatyaspor, İstanbulspor 2020–21, 2022–24
- Veton Tusha – Denizlispor 2020–21
- Samir Ujkani – Çaykur Rizespor 2018–19
- Valmir Veliu – Gaziantep, İstanbulspor 2022–24
- Idriz Voca – MKE Ankaragücü 2020–21
- Fadil Vokrri – Fenerbahçe 1990–92
- Arbër Zeneli – Adana Demirspor 2023–24
- **Altin Zeqiri** – **Çaykur Rizespor** 2023–

== Latvia ==
- Deniss Ivanovs – Sivasspor 2010–11

== Lebanon ==
- Bilal Aziz Özer – Kayserispor 2008–09
- Joan Oumari – Sivasspor 2016–17

== Liechtenstein ==
- Cengiz Biçer – Mersin İdmanyurdu 2011–13

== Liberia ==
- Joseph Amoah – MKE Ankaragücü, Göztepe 2001–03
- James Debbah – MKE Ankaragücü 1998
- Jimmy Dixon – Manisaspor 2009–12
- Mohammed Kamara – Hatayspor 2020–23
- **Prince Martor Jr.** – **Gençlerbirliği** 2026–
- Amadaiya Rennie – Antalyaspor 2016–17
- Tonia Tisdell – MKE Ankaragücü, Mersin İdmanyurdu, Osmanlıspor 2011–12, 2015–16, 2017–18
- Theo Weeks – Ankaraspor, MKE Ankaragücü 2008–11

== Libya ==
- Al-Musrati – Beşiktaş 2023–25
- Tarik El Taib – Gaziantepspor 2004–06

== Lithuania ==
- Gintaras Staučė – Galatasaray, Karşıyaka, Sarıyer 1994–97
- Gediminas Paulauskas – MKE Ankaragücü 2008
- Žydrūnas Karčemarskas – Gaziantepspor, Osmanlıspor 2010–18
- Arvydas Novikovas – BB Erzurumspor 2020–21
- Darvydas Šernas – Gaziantepspor 2013
- Marius Stankevičius – Gaziantepspor 2013–14
- Ernestas Šetkus – Sivasspor 2015–16
- Modestas Vorobjovas – İstanbulspor 2023–24

== Luxembourg ==
- Gerson Rodrigues – MKE Ankaragücü, Sivasspor 2019–20, 2023–24

== Madagascar ==
- **Rayan Raveloson** – **Amedspor** 2026–

== Malaysia ==
- João Figueiredo – Gaziantep, İstanbul Başakşehir 2021–25
- Natxo Insa – Antalyaspor 2013–14

== Mali ==
- Mahamadou Ba – BB Erzurumspor 2020–21
- Samba Camara – Sivasspor 2019–25
- Fernand Coulibaly – Adana Demirspor, Gaziantepspor, MKE Ankaragücü, Gaziantepspor, Denizlispor, Siirtspor, Diyarbakırspor 1994–99, 2000–03
- Cheick Oumar Dabo – Gençlerbirliği 2001–02
- Cheick Diabaté – Osmanlıspor 2016–18
- **Fousseni Diabaté** – Sivasspor, Trabzonspor, Göztepe, Giresunspor, **Kasımpaşa** 2018–19, 2020–22, 2025–
- Abdoulay Diaby – Beşiktaş, Pendikspor 2019–20, 2023–24
- **Moussa Diakité** – **Çaykur Rizespor** 2026–
- Souleymane Diarra – Gaziantep 2019–20
- **Thiemoko Diarra** – **Kasımpaşa** 2026–
- Nouha Dicko – Gaziantep, Yeni Malatyaspor 2020–22
- Moussa Djenepo – Antalyaspor 2024–25
- Mamadou Fofana – Alanyaspor 2017
- **Massadio Haïdara** – **Kocaelispor** 2025–
- **Habib Keïta** – **Kocaelispor** 2025–
- Souleymane Keita – Sivasspor 2010–12
- **Sékou Koïta** – **Gençlerbirliği** 2025–
- Youssouf Koné – Hatayspor 2020–21
- **Moussa Kyabou** – **Gençlerbirliği** 2025–
- Aly Mallé – Yeni Malatyaspor 2020–21
- **Dorgeles Nene** – **Fenerbahçe** 2025–
- Hadi Sacko – MKE Ankaragücü 2018–19
- **Modibo Sagnan** – **Çaykur Rizespor** 2025–
- Mamadou Samassa – Sivasspor 2019–21
- **Anto Sekongo** – **Samsunspor** 2026–
- Samba Sow – Karabükspor, Kayserispor 2013–17
- Abdul Wahid Sissoko – Akhisar Belediyespor 2016–19
- Yacouba Sylla – Kayseri Erciyesspor 2014–15
- El Bilal Touré – Beşiktaş 2025–26
- **Adama Traoré** – **Gençlerbirliği** 2025–
- Bakaye Traoré – Kayseri Erciyesspor, Bursaspor 2013–16
- Adama Traoré – Hatayspor 2020–22
- Hamidou Traoré – Karabükspor 2017–18
- Mustapha Yatabaré – Trabzonspor, Karabükspor, Konyaspor, Sivasspor 2014–15, 2016–23

== Martinique ==
- Mickaël Malsa – Kasımpaşa 2022–23

== Mauritania ==
- Souleymane Doukara – Osmanlıspor, Antalyaspor, Giresunspor 2017–19, 2021–22
- Diallo Guidileye – Gençlerbirliği 2017–18
- Aboubakar Kamara – Yeni Malatyaspor 2018–19
- El Mami Tetah – Alanyaspor 2021–22

== Mexico ==
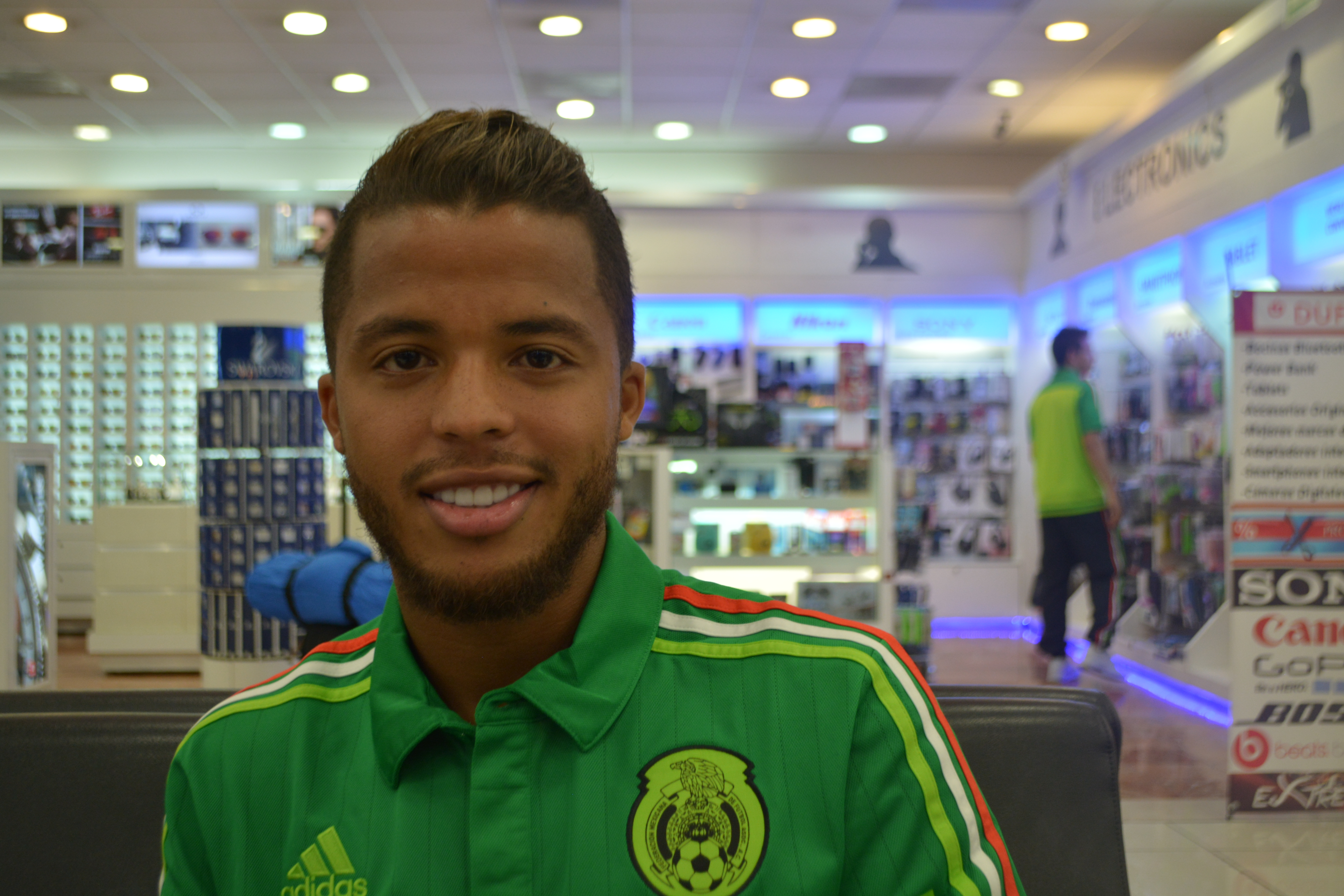
Giovanni Dos Santos

- Sergio Almaguer – Galatasaray 2002
- Edson Álvarez – Fenerbahçe 2025–26
- Antonio de Nigris – Gaziantepspor, Ankaraspor, MKE Ankaragücü 2006–09
- Giovani dos Santos – Galatasaray 2010
- Rogelio Funes Mori – Eskişehirspor 2014–15
- Diego Reyes – Fenerbahçe 2018–19

== Moldova ==
- Serghei Epureanu – Samsunspor, İstanbulspor 2000–01
- Alexandru Epureanu – İstanbul Başakşehir, Ümraniyespor 2014–23

== Montenegro ==
- Radoslav Batak – Ankaraspor, Antalyaspor 2005–07, 2009–10
- Radomir Đalović – Kayseri Erciyesspor 2006–07
- Ardijan Djokaj – Trabzonspor, Ankaraspor 2005–07
- Petar Grbić – Akhisar Belediyespor 2015–16
- Ivan Kecojević – Gaziantepspor 2012–13
- Miodrag Martać – Karşıyaka 1987–90
- Vukan Perović – Adanaspor 1977–78
- Vasilije Radović – Fenerbahçe 1966–67
- Vladimir Rodić – Karabükspor 2016–17
- **Stefan Savić** – **Trabzonspor** 2024–
- Vukan Savićević – Giresunspor 2022–23
- Marko Simić – Kayserispor 2012–14, 2015–16
- Zoran Simović – Galatasaray 1984–90
- Aleksandar Šćekić – Gençlerbirliği 2016–18
- Žarko Vukčević – Zonguldakspor 1985–87

== Morocco ==
- Mohamed Abarhoun – Çaykur Rizespor 2018–20
- Nordin Amrabat – Kayserispor, Galatasaray 2011–14
- **Sofyan Amrabat** – **Fenerbahçe** 2024–
- Ismaïl Aissati – Antalyaspor, Alanyaspor 2012–13, 2016–17
- Youssef Aït Bennasser – Samsunspor, Kayserispor 2023–26
- Jamal Alioui – Karabükspor 2010
- Yacine Bammou – Alanyaspor 2019–20
- Abdelaziz Barrada – Antalyaspor 2018–19
- Younès Belhanda – Galatasaray, Adana Demirspor 2017–24
- Medhi Benatia – Fatih Karagümrük 2021–22
- Zakarya Bergdich – Denizlispor, BB Erzurumspor 2019–21
- **Benjamin Bouchouari** – **Trabzonspor** 2025–
- Nourdin Boukhari – Kasımpaşa 2009–10
- Mehdi Bourabia – Konyaspor, Kayserispor 2017–18, 2023–24
- Khalid Boutaïb – Yeni Malatyaspor 2017–19
- Aatif Chahechouhe – Sivasspor, Fenerbahçe, Çaykur Rizespor, Antalyaspor, Fatih Karagümrük, BB Erzurumspor 2012–21
- Issam Chebake – Yeni Malatyaspor 2017–21
- Mounir Chouiar – Yeni Malatyaspor, İstanbul Başakşehir, Kasımpaşa 2021–23
- Michaël Chrétien Basser – Bursaspor 2011–14
- Manuel da Costa – Sivasspor, İstanbul Başakşehir F.K., Trabzonspor, BB Erzurumspor 2013–15, 2017–21
- Nabil Dirar – Fenerbahçe, Kasımpaşa 2017–22
- Ayoub El Kaabi – Hatayspor 2021–23
- Moestafa El Kabir – Gençlerbirliği, Çaykur Rizespor 2015–19
- Ahmed El Messaoudi – Gaziantep 2021–22
- **Jawad El Yamiq** – **Eyüpspor** 2026–
- Youssef En-Nesyri – Fenerbahçe 2024–26
- Reda Ereyahi – Göztepe 2000
- Fayçal Fajr – Sivasspor 2020–22
- Zouhair Feddal – Alanyaspor 2022–23
- Youssouf Hadji – Elazığspor 2013
- Amine Harit – İstanbul Başakşehir 2025–26
- Montasser Lahtimi – Trabzonspor 2022–23
- Hamza Mendyl – Gaziantep – 2021–22
- Youness Mokhtar – MKE Ankaragücü 2018–19
- Munir – Hatayspor 2020–22
- Adrien Regattin – Osmanlıspor 2016–18
- Marwane Saâdane – Çaykur Rizespor 2016–19
- **Abdelhamid Sabiri** – **Eyüpspor** 2026–
- Romain Saïss – Beşiktaş 2022–23
- Rial Sellam – Bursaspor 1966–67
- Jamal Sellami – Beşiktaş 1997–98
- Khalid Sinouh – Kasımpaşa 2007–08
- Oussama Tannane – Göztepe 2021–22
- Mehdi Taouil – Sivasspor 2013–16
- Oussama Targhalline – Alanyaspor 2022–23
- Adnane Tighadouini – Kayserispor 2015–16
- Hakim Ziyech – Galatasaray 2023–25

== Namibia ==
- Razundara Tjikuzu – Çaykur Rizespor, İstanbul Büyükşehir Belediyespor, Trabzonspor, Diyarbakırspor, Kasımpaşa 2006–11

== Netherlands ==
- **Nathan Aké** – **Fenerbahçe** 2026–
- Ryan Babel – Kasımpaşa, Beşiktaş, Galatasaray 2013–15, 2017–22
- Nacer Barazite – Yeni Malatyaspor 2017–18
- Bilal Bayazit – Kayserispor 2021–26
- Mike van Beijnen – Gençlerbirliği 2019–20
- Jeffrey Bruma – Kasımpaşa 2021–23
- Cihat Çelik – Kocaelispor 2025–26
- Brahim Darri – BB Erzurumspor, Fatih Karagümrük 2020–21, 2022–24
- Frank de Boer – Galatasaray 2003–04
- Nigel de Jong – Galatasaray 2016–18
- Brahim Darri – Fatih Karagümrük, BB Erzurumspor 2020–21
- Royston Drenthe – Kayseri Erciyesspor 2014–15
- Eljero Elia – İstanbul Başakşehir 2017–20
- Marvin Emnes – Akhisar Belediyespor 2017–18
- Leroy Fer – Alanyaspor 2021–24
- **Godfried Frimpong** – **Kasımpaşa** 2025–
- Dogan Gölpek – Konyaspor 2020–21
- Ferhat Görgülü – Gençlerbirliği, Karabükspor 2013–18
- Vincent Janssen – Fenerbahçe 2017–18
- Dirk Kuyt – Fenerbahçe 2012–15
- Noa Lang – Galatasaray 2025–26
- Jeremain Lens – Fenerbahçe, Beşiktaş, Fatih Karagümrük 2016–22
- Kevin Luckassen – Kayserispor 2020–21
- Adam Maher – Osmanlıspor 2016–17
- Queensy Menig – Sivasspor 2023–25
- Hilmi Mihçi – Sivasspor 2006–07
- **Anthony Musaba** – Samsunspor, **Fenerbahçe** 2025–
- Kiki Musampa – Trabzonspor 2006–07
- **Jayden Oosterwolde** – **Fenerbahçe** 2022–
- Joey Pelupessy – Giresunspor 2021–22
- Glynor Plet – Alanyaspor 2017–19
- **Ernest Poku** – **Beşiktaş** 2026–
- Ben Rienstra – Kayserispor 2019–20
- Lodewijk Roembiak – Antalyaspor 1994–96
- Driess Saddiki – Kasımpaşa – 2023–24
- Mustafa Saymak – Çaykur Rizespor 2018–19
- Mats Seuntjens – Gençlerbirliği 2019–20
- Wesley Sneijder – Galatasaray 2013–17
- **Elayis Tavşan** – **Samsunspor** 2025–
- Patrick van Aanholt – Galatasaray 2021–23
- Sander van de Streek – Antalyaspor 2023–26
- John van den Brom – İstanbulspor 1995–96
- Gregory van der Wiel – Fenerbahçe 2016–17
- Rick van Drongelen – Samsunspor 2023–26
- Ulrich van Gobbel – Galatasaray 1995–96
- Pierre van Hooijdonk – Fenerbahçe 2003–05
- Bart van Hintum – Gaziantepspor 2016–17
- Robin van Persie – Fenerbahçe 2015–18
- Peter van Vossen – İstanbulspor 1995
- Tonny Vilhena – Alanyaspor 2024–25
- Boy Waterman – Karabükspor 2013–15
- Wout Weghorst – Beşiktaş – 2022–23
- Nordin Wooter – Sivasspor 2006–07
- Salih Yildiz
- Marvin Zeegelaar – Elazığspor 2012–13, 2014
- Sergio Zijler – Orduspor 2011

== New Zealand ==
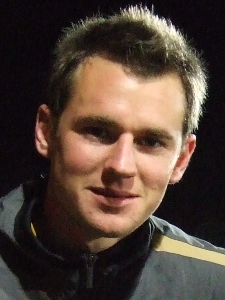
Shane Smeltz

- Joe Champness – Giresunspor 2021–22
- Shane Smeltz – Gençlerbirliği 2010–11

== Nigeria ==
- **Ahmed Abdullahi** – **Eyüpspor** 2026–
- Shehu Abdullahi – Bursaspor – 2017–19
- David Solomon Abwo – Gençlerbirliği 2006
- Victor Agali – Kayseri Erciyesspor, MKE Ankaragücü 2005–07
- Akeem Agbetu – Kocaelispor, Sivasspor 2008–10
- Julius Aghahowa – Kayserispor 2008–09
- Alloysius Agu – Kayserispor 1994–97
- Mikel Agu – Bursaspor 2017–18
- David Akintola – Hatayspor, Adana Demirspor, Çaykur Rizespor 2020–25
- Joseph Akpala – Karabükspor 2013–15
- Daniel Amokachi – Beşiktaş 1996–99
- Gbenga Arokoyo – Gaziantepspor 2014–16
- Iyayi Atiemwen – Çaykur Rizespor 2016–17
- **Chidozie Awaziem** – Çaykur Rizespor, **Konyaspor** 2018–19, 2026–
- Tijani Babangida – Gençlerbirliği 2000–01
- Funsho Bamgboye – Hatayspor 2024–25
- Godfrey Bitok – Gaziantep 2024–25
- John Chibuike – Gaziantepspor, Samsunspor 2014–16, 2017–18
- Macauley Chrisantus – Sivasspor 2014–15
- Fisayo Dele-Bashiru – Hatayspor 2023–24
- Tom Dele-Bashiru – Gençlerbirliği 2025–26
- **Anthony Dennis** – **Göztepe** 2024–
- Emmanuel Dennis – İstanbul Başakşehir 2023–24
- Emem Eduok – Kasımpaşa, Erzurumspor 2016–19
- Ekigho Ehiosun – Samsunspor, Gençlerbirliği 2011–13
- Elderson Echiéjilé – Sivasspor 2017–18
- Bright Edomwonyi – Çaykur Rizespor 2017–18
- Emmanuel Emenike – Karabükspor 2010–11, Fenerbahçe 2013–15, 2016–17
- Michael Eneramo – Sivasspor, Beşiktaş, Karabükspor, İstanbul Başakşehir 2011–16
- Anderson Esiti – Göztepe 2020–21
- **Peter Etebo** – Galatasaray, **Gençlerbirliği** 2020–21, 2025–
- Emeka Friday Eze – İstanbulspor, Pendikspor 2022–24
- Patrick Friday Eze – Konyaspor 2017–18
- Francis Ezeh – Adana Demirspor 2021–22
- Imoh Ezekiel – Konyaspor 2017–18
- Edema Godmin Fuludu – Altay 1994–97
- **Victor Gidado** – **Gaziantep** 2025–
- Brown Ideye – Göztepe 2020–21
- Nosa Igiebor – Çaykur Rizespor 2017
- Dominic Iorfa – Galatasaray 1992–93
- Leke James – Sivasspor 2021–23
- Uche Kalu – Çaykur Rizespor 2013
- Olarenwaju Kayode – Gaziantep, Sivasspor, Ümraniyespor 2019–23
- Lanre Kehinde – MKE Ankaragücü – 2018–19
- Raheem Lawal – Mersin İdmanyurdu, Eskişehirspor, Osmanlıspor 2013–18
- Victor Moses – Fenerbahçe 2018–20
- Paul Mukairu – Antalyaspor 2019–22
- Ahmed Musa – Fatih Karagümrük, Sivasspor 2021–24
- **Wilfred Ndidi** – **Beşiktaş** 2025–
- Lawrence Nicholas – Fatih Karagümrük 2022–24
- **Chibuike Nwaiwu** – **Trabzonspor** 2025–
- Anthony Nwakaeme – Trabzonspor 2018–22, 2024–26
- Obinna Nwobodo – Göztepe 2020–22
- Gabriel Obekpa – Bodrum 2024–25
- Joel Obi – Alanyaspor 2018–19
- Mikel John Obi – Trabzonspor 2019–20
- Godfrey Oboabona – Çaykur Rizespor 2013–17
- Oliver Ogbonnaya – Gençlerbirliği 2011–12
- Uchenna Ogundu – Alanyaspor 2025–26
- Azubuike Okechukwu – Yeni Malatyaspor, Çaykur Rizespor, İstanbul Başakşehir 2017–23
- Uche Okechukwu (Deniz Uygar) – Fenerbahçe, İstanbulspor 1993–2006
- David Okereke – Gaziantep 2024–25
- Jay-Jay Okocha (Muhammet Yavuz) – Fenerbahçe 1996–98
- Christopher Ohen – Beşiktaş 1998–99
- Jonathan Okoronkwo – Hatayspor 2024–25
- **Ibrahim Olawoyin** – **Çaykur Rizespor** 2023–
- Michael Ologo – İstanbulspor 2022–23
- Kenneth Omeruo – Kasımpaşa, Alanyaspor 2015–17, 2023–25
- Ogenyi Onazi – Trabzonspor, Denizlispor 2016–20
- **Paul Onuachu** – **Trabzonspor** 2023–24, 2025–
- Paschal Onyedika Okoli – Bursaspor 2017–18
- Henry Onyekuru – Galatasaray, Adana Demirspor, Gençlerbirliği 2018–21, 2022–23, 2025–26
- **Victor Orakpo** – **Gençlerbirliği** 2026–
- **Gift Orban** – **Amedspor** 2026–
- Wilson Oruma – Samsunspor 1998–99
- Bright Osayi-Samuel – Fenerbahçe 2020–25
- **Victor Osimhen** – **Galatasaray** 2024–
- Nduka Ozokwo – Mersin İdmanyurdu 2011–13
- Valentine Ozornwafor – Galatasaray – 2020–21
- Isaac Promise – Gençlerbirliği, Trabzonspor, Manisaspor, Antalyaspor, Balıkesirspor 2005–15
- Gideon Adinoy Sani – Akhisar Belediyespor 2012–13
- Jesse Sekidika – Galatasaray, Konyaspor, Ümraniyespor 2019–21, 2022–23
- Victor Shaka – Trabzonspor 1997
- Ike Shorunmu – Beşiktaş, Samsunspor 1999–2001, 2002–05
- Seth Sincere – Yeni Malatyaspor 2017–19
- **Yira Sor** – **Amedspor** 2026–
- Taye Taiwo – Bursaspor 2013–14
- William Troost-Ekong – Bursaspor – 2017–18
- Kalu Uche – Kasımpaşa 2012–13
- Aminu Umar – Osmanlıspor, Çaykur Rizespor 2015–22
- John Utaka – Sivasspor 2013–15
- Anthony Uzodimma – Kayserispor 2019–25
- Yakubu – Kayserispor 2015–16
- Joseph Yobo – Fenerbahçe 2010–13
- Ayila Yussuf – Orduspor 2013
- Simon Zenke – Samsunspor, İstanbul Büyükşehir Belediyespor 2011–12, 2013

== North Macedonia ==
- Ezgjan Alioski – Fenerbahçe 2022–23
- Jani Atanasov – Bursaspor 2018–19
- Daniel Avramovski – Kayserispor 2020–22
- **Enis Bardhi** – Trabzonspor, Bodrum, **Konyaspor** 2022–
- Dančo Celeski – Kayserispor 1997–98
- Darko Churlinov – Kocaelispor 2025–26
- Erdon Daci – Konyaspor 2019–21
- Eljif Elmas – Fenerbahçe 2017–19
- Valon Ethemi – İstanbulspor, Konyaspor 2022–24
- Agim Ibraimi – Eskişehirspor 2010–11
- Adis Jahović – Göztepe, Konyaspor, Yeni Malatyaspor, Antalyaspor 2017–22
- Čedomir Janevski – İstanbulspor 1995
- Gjore Jovanovski – Samsunspor, MKE Ankaragücü 1986–89
- Zoran Jovanovski – Samsunspor 2002–03
- Berat Kalkan – Kasımpaşa 2020–24
- Dragan Kanatlarovski – Karşıyaka 1993–94
- Stevica Kuzmanovski – Kocaelispor, Galatasaray, Antalyaspor, Eskişehirspor 1992–96
- Jovan Manev – Adana Demirspor 2022–25
- Goran Maznov – Diyarbakırspor 2005–06
- Petar Miloševski – Trabzonspor, Malatyaspor, Akçaabat Sebatspor 1998–2005
- Ilija Najdoski – Denizlispor 1994–95
- Muarem Muarem – Eskişehirspor 2015–16
- Mensur Nedžipi – Zeytinburnuspor 1990–91
- Igor Nikolovski – Sakaryaspor, Trabzonspor 1998–2001
- Arbën Nuhiji – Yozgatspor 2001–02
- Goran Pandev – Galatasaray 2014–15
- Erdal Rakip – Antalyaspor 2022–25
- Artim Šakiri – Malatyaspor 2001–02
- Goce Sedloski – Diyarbakırspor 2005–06
- Žarko Serafimovski – Trabzonspor 2000–01
- Luka Stankovski – Gaziantep 2021–24
- Goran Stavrevski – Diyarbakırspor 2003–07
- Veliče Šumulikoski – Bursaspor 2006–08
- Leonard Zuta – Konyaspor 2018–20
- Darusselam Hemdil – Türk Telekom, Sakaryaspor 1972–76

== Northern Ireland ==
- Kyle Lafferty – Çaykur Rizespor 2014–15

== Norway ==
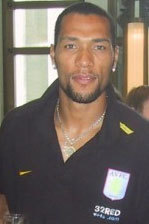
John Carew

- Liban Abdi – Çaykur Rizespor 2014–15
- **Morten Bjørlo** – **Konyaspor** 2024–
- Torgeir Børven – MKE Ankaragücü, Gaziantep 2020–23
- John Carew – Beşiktaş 2004–05
- Omar Elabdellaoui – Galatasaray 2020–22
- Morten Gamst Pedersen – Karabükspor 2013–14
- Fredrik Gulbrandsen – Başakşehir, Adana Demirspor 2019–23
- **Tobias Gulliksen** – **Kocaelispor** 2026–
- Vegar Eggen Hedenstad – Fatih Karagümrük 2020–22
- Tobias Heintz – Kasımpaşa 2018–20
- Etzaz Hussain – Sivasspor 2016
- Ronny Johnsen – Beşiktaş 1995–96
- Azar Karadas – Kasımpaşa 2009–12
- **Markus Karlsbakk** – **Çorum** 2026–
- Joshua King – Fenerbahçe 2022–24
- Rune Lange – Trabzonspor 2000
- Martin Linnes – Galatasaray 2015–21
- Mathias Fjørtoft Løvik – Trabzonspor 2025–26
- Fredrik Midtsjø – Galatasaray, Pendikspor, Eyüpspor 2022–25
- Thomas Myhre – Beşiktaş 2001–02
- Kristian Opseth – Erzurumspor 2018–19
- Branimir Poljac – Konyaspor 2009–10
- Alexander Søderlund – Çaykur Rizespor 2020–21
- Alexander Sørloth – Trabzonspor 2019–20
- Gøran Sørloth – Bursaspor 1993–94
- Arild Stavrum – Beşiktaş 2001–02
- Sander Svendsen – Konyaspor 2025–26
- Jonas Svensson – Adana Demirspor, Beşiktaş 2021–26
- Zlatko Tripić – Göztepe 2019–21
- Anders Trondsen – Trabzonspor 2021–22
- Fredrik Ulvestad – Sivasspor 2021–23
- Ghayas Zahid – MKE Ankaragücü 2022–23

== Pakistan ==
- Maula Bakhsh – Mersin İdmanyurdu 1967–68
- Abdul Jabbar – Mersin İdmanyurdu 1967–68

== Panama ==
- **Michael Amir Murillo** – **Beşiktaş** 2025–

== Paraguay ==
- Emilio Aldama – Göztepe 1999–2000
- Adam Bareiro – Alanyaspor 2020–21
- Óscar Cardozo – Trabzonspor 2014–16
- Jorge Morel – Adana Demirspor 2022–23
- Robert Piris Da Motta – Gençlerbirliği 2020–21
- Cristian Riveros – Kayserispor 2011–13
- Óscar Romero – Pendikspor 2023–24
- Jonathan Santana – Kayserispor 2010–12
- Santiago Salcedo – MKE Ankaragücü 2003–04
- Braian Samudio – Çaykur Rizespor, Antalyaspor 2018–21, 2024–25
- Delio Toledo – Kayserispor 2006–10

== Peru ==
- Luis Advíncula – Bursaspor 2015–16
- Ronald Pablo Baroni – Ankaragücü 1996–97
- Christian Cueva – Yeni Malatyaspor 2020–21
- Paolo Hurtado – Konyaspor 2018–21
- Francesco Manassero Zegarra – Beşiktaş 1993
- Andrés Mendoza – Diyarbakırspor 2009–10
- José del Solar – Beşiktaş 1998–99
- Santiago Salazar – Trabzonspor 2001–02
- Ysrael Zúñiga – Bursaspor 2008–09

== Philippines ==
- Gerrit Holtmann – Antalyaspor 2023–24

== Poland ==
- Karol Angielski – Sivasspor 2022–23
- Jarosław Araszkiewicz – Bakırköyspor 1990–92
- Jarosław Bako – Beşiktaş 1991–93
- **Adrian Benedyczak** – **Kasımpaşa** 2025–
- Jan Biegański – Sivasspor 2024–25
- Jarosław Bieniuk – Antalyaspor 2006–09
- Paweł Brożek – Trabzonspor 2011–12
- Piotr Brożek – Trabzonspor 2011–12
- Adam Buksa – Antalyaspor 2023–24
- Jacek Cyzio – Trabzonspor, Karşıyaka 1992–95
- Roman Dąbrowski (Kaan Dobra) – Kocaelispor, Beşiktaş, Antalyaspor 1994–2007
- **Igor Drapiński** – **Samsunspor** 2026–
- Piotr Dziewicki – Antalyaspor 2006–09
- Dariusz Dźwigała – Diyarbakirspor 2001–02
- Przemysław Frankowski – Galatasaray 2024–25
- Dominik Furman – Gençlerbirliği 2020–21
- Rafał Gikiewicz – MKE Ankaragücü 2023–24
- Arkadiusz Głowacki – Trabzonspor 2010–12
- Adam Grad – Kayserispor 1994–95
- Kamil Grosicki – Sivasspor 2011–13
- Maciej Iwański – Manisaspor 2011
- Jarosław Jach – Çaykur Rizespor 2018–19
- Czesław Jakołcewicz – Fenerbahçe 1990–91
- Damian Kądzior – Alanyaspor 2020–21
- **Jakub Kałuziński** – Antalyaspor, **İstanbul Başakşehir** 2023–
- **Michał Karbownik** – **İstanbul Başakşehir** 2026–
- **Kacper Kozłowski** – **Gaziantep** 2024–
- Janusz Kupcewicz – Adanaspor 1988–89
- Roman Kosecki – Galatasaray 1990–91
- Marcin Kuś – İstanbul Büyükşehir Belediyespor 2008–12
- Mateusz Łęgowski – Eyüpspor 2025–26
- Karol Linetty – Kocaelispor 2025–26
- Mateusz Lis – Altay, Göztepe 2021–22, 2024–26
- Daniel Łukasik – MKE Ankaragücü 2019–22
- Radosław Majdan – Göztepe, Bursaspor 2001–02, 2003–04
- Patryk Małecki – Eskişehirspor 2012
- **Konrad Michalak** – MKE Ankaragücü, Çaykur Rizespor, Konyaspor, **Eyüpspor** 2019–24, 2026–
- Adrian Mierzejewski – Trabzonspor 2011–14
- Olgierd Moskalewicz – Diyarbakirspor 2001–02
- Radosław Murawski – Denizlispor 2019–21
- Michał Nalepa – Gençlerbirliği 2025–26
- Piotr Nowak – Bakırköyspor 1990–92
- Ludovic Obraniak – Çaykur Rizespor 2015
- Paweł Olkowski – Gaziantep 2019–22
- Bogusław Pachelski – Adanaspor 1990–91
- Andrzej Pałasz – Çaykur Rizespor 1989–92
- Mariusz Pawełek – Konyaspor, Çaykur Rizespor 2011, 2013
- Bartłomiej Pawłowski – Gaziantep 2019–20
- Michał Pazdan – MKE Ankaragücü 2018–21
- Krzysztof Piątek – İstanbul Başakşehir 2023–25
- Kamil Piątkowski – Kasımpașa 2024–25
- Arkadiusz Piech – Sivasspor 2013
- Tymoteusz Puchacz – Trabzonspor 2021–22
- Marcin Robak – Konyaspor, Mersin İdmanyurdu 2011–13
- Artur Sarnat – Diyarbakirspor 2001–02
- Jakub Słowik – Konyaspor 2023–25
- Artur Sobiech – Fatih Karagümrük 2019–21
- Piotr Soczyński – Fenerbahçe, Vanspor 1991–92, 1994–96
- Adam Stachowiak – Denizlispor 2019–20
- Mirosław Szymkowiak – Trabzonspor 2004–07
- Łukasz Szukała – Osmanlıspor, MKE Ankaragücü 2015–19
- Jakub Szumski – BB Erzurumspor, Samsunspor 2020–21, 2023–24
- Sebastian Szymański – Fenerbahçe 2023–26
- Patryk Szysz – İstanbul Başakşehir 2022–23, 2024–25
- **Kacper Tobiasz** – **Gaziantep** 2026–
- Patryk Tuszyński – Çaykur Rizespor 2015–17
- Mateusz Wieteska – Kocaelispor 2025–26
- Kamil Wilczek – Göztepe 2019–20
- Tomasz Zdebel – Gençlerbirliği 2000–03
- Adam Zejer – Beşiktaş, Gaziantepspor 1991–93
- Jacek Ziarkowski – Malatyaspor 2003–04
- Michał Żewłakow – MKE Ankaragücü 2010–11

== Portugal ==
- Hugo Almeida – Beşiktaş 2011–14
- Bruno Alves – Fenerbahçe 2013–16
- Zé António – Manisaspor 2008
- Hélder Barbosa – Akhisar Belediyespor, Hatayspor 2017–19, 2020–21
- Beto – Göztepe 2017–20
- Aylton Boa Morte – Kayserispor 2023–25
- José Bosingwa – Trabzonspor 2013–15
- Pedro Brazão – Bodrum 2024–25
- Bruma – Galatasaray, Fenerbahçe 2013–15, 2022–23
- **Cafú** – **Kasımpaşa** 2024–
- João Camacho – Fatih Karagümrük 2025–26
- Daniel Candeias – Alanyaspor, Gençlerbirliği 2016–17, 2019–23
- **Miguel Cardoso** – Kayserispor, **Erzurumspor** 2021–
- André Castro – Kasımpaşa, Göztepe 2013–20
- Ivan Cavaleiro – Alanyaspor 2022–23
- Chiquinho – Giresunspor 2021–22
- Nuno Coelho – Balıkesirspor 2014
- Miguel Crespo – Fenerbahçe, İstanbul Başakşehir 2021–26
- Custódio – Akhisar Belediyespor 2015–17
- **Matchoi Djaló** – **İstanbul Başakşehir** 2024–
- **Tiago Djaló** – **Beşiktaş** 2025–
- Edinho – Kayseri Erciyesspor 2014–15
- Eduardo – İstanbul Büyükşehir Belediyespor 2012–13
- Ricardo Esgaio – Fatih Karagümrük 2025–26
- Gedson Fernandes – Galatasaray, Çaykur Rizespor, Beşiktaş 2020–25
- Joelson Fernandes – Hatayspor 2023–25
- Jorge Fernandes – Kasımpaşa 2019–20
- Manuel Fernandes – Beşiktaş 2011–14
- Miguel Garcia – Orduspor 2011–13
- André Geraldes – İstanbul Büyükşehir Belediyespor 2012–13
- Vítor Gomes – Balıkesirspor 2015
- Zé Gomes – Konyaspor 2008–10
- **Diogo Gonçalves** – **Konyaspor** 2025–
- **Tiago Gouveia** – **Gençlerbirliği** 2026–
- Josué – Bursaspor, Galatasaray, Osmanlıspor, Akhisar Belediyespor 2014–19
- **Rafael Leão** – **Galatasaray** 2026–
- **Nuno Lima** – **Alanyaspor** 2023–
- Miguel Lopes – Akhisar Belediyespor, Kayserispor 2016–21
- Rony Lopes – Alanyaspor 2024–25
- Tiago Lopes – Kayserispor, Denizlispor 2017–21
- **Rafael Luís** – **Gençlerbirliği** 2026–
- Ariza Makukula – Kayserispor, Manisaspor, Karşıyaka 2009–13
- Pedro Malheiro – Trabzonspor 2024–25
- José Marafona – Alanyaspor 2019–22
- **João Mário** – **Beşiktaş** 2024–
- Fernando Meira – Galatasaray 2008–09
- Raul Meireles – Fenerbahçe 2012–16
- João Mendes – Kayserispor 2025–26
- **Pedro Mendes** – **Gençlerbirliği** 2026–
- Manuel Mendoza – Boluspor 1970–71
- Roderick Miranda – Gaziantep 2020–21
- Nani – Fenerbahçe, Adana Demirspor 2015–16, 2023–24
- Neca – Konyaspor, Ankaraspor 2007–09
- Luís Neto – Fenerbahçe 2017–18
- João Novais – Alanyaspor 2021–22, 2023–24
- Nélson Oliveira – Konyaspor – 2023–24
- Sérgio Oliveira – Galatasaray 2022–24
- Marco Paixão – Altay 2021–22
- Pedrinho – MKE Ankaragücü 2022–24
- Rui Pedro – Hatayspor 2023–25
- Pelé – Eskişehirspor 2010–12
- **Alexandre Penetra** – **Çorum** 2026–
- Pepe – Beşiktaş 2017–19
- João Pereira – Trabzonspor 2017–21
- **Pedro Pereira** – Alanyaspor, **Gençlerbirliği** 2022–23, 2025–
- Tiago Pinto – Osmanlıspor, MKE Ankaragücü 2015–22
- Pizzi – İstanbul Başakşehir 2021–22
- Ricardo Quaresma – Beşiktaş, Kasımpaşa 2010–12, 2015–20
- Pedro Rebocho – Beşiktaş 2019–20
- João Ribeiro – Orduspor 2011–12
- Rúben Ribeiro – Hatayspor 2020–23
- Rochinha – Kasımpaşa 2023–24
- Bruno Rodrigues – Fatih Karagümrük 2022–23
- **Kévin Rodrigues** – Adana Demirspor, Kasımpaşa, **Gaziantep** 2022–
- André Santos – Balıkesirspor 2014–15
- **Noah Saviolo** – **Trabzonspor** 2026–
- **Nélson Semedo** – **Fenerbahçe** 2025–
- Nuno Sequeira – Pendikspor 2023–24
- Henrique Sereno – Kayserispor 2013–14
- Jota Silva – Beşiktaş 2025–26
- **Rafa Silva** – **Beşiktaş** 2024–
- Simão – Beşiktaş 2011–12
- **Afonso Sousa** – **Samsunspor** 2025–
- André Sousa – Gaziantep 2019–21
- Diogo Sousa – Antalyaspor, Bodrum 2021–22, 2024–25
- **Gonçalo Sousa** – **Kocaelispor** 2026–
- Dimas Teixeira – Fenerbahçe 1999
- Ricardo Vaz Tê – Akhisar Belediyespor 2015–17
- Ricardo Velho – Gençlerbirliği 2025–26
- Rúben Vezo – Eyüpspor 2024–25
- Miguel Vieira – İstanbul Başakşehir 2019–20
- Abel Xavier – Galatasaray 2003

== Qatar ==
- Mohammed Salem Al-Enazi – Yimpaş Yozgatspor 2000

== Republic of the Congo ==
- **Yhoan Andzouana** – **Konyaspor** 2025–
- Lucien Aubey – Sivasspor 2009–10
- Durel Avounou – Ümraniyespor 2022–23
- Thievy Bifouma – Sivasspor, Osmanlıspor, Ankaragücü, Yeni Malatyaspor 2016–20
- Dzon Delarge – Osmanlıspor, Bursaspor 2016–18
- **Antoine Makoumbou** – **Samsunspor** 2025–
- **Gaius Makouta** – **Alanyaspor** 2024–
- **Chandrel Massanga** – Hatayspor, **Eyüpspor** 2023–25, 2026–
- Bevic Moussiti-Oko – MKE Ankaragücü 2022–23
- Delvin N'Dinga – Sivasspor, Antalyaspor 2017–20
- Dylan Saint-Louis – Hatayspor 2021–23

== Romania ==
- **Ümit Akdağ** – **Alanyaspor** 2022–23, 2025–
- Denis Alibec – Kayserispor 2020–21
- Florin Andone – Galatasaray 2019–20
- Marius Alexe – Karabükspor 2017
- Liviu Antal – Gençlerbirliği 2014–15
- Ion Barbu – Beşiktaş 1970–71
- Cosmin Bodea – Sakaryaspor 1999
- **Andrei Borza** – **Çorum** 2026–
- Alexandru Bourceanu – Trabzonspor 2014
- Florin Bratu – Galatasaray 2003–04
- Stelian Carabaș – MKE Ankaragücü 2002–03
- Florin Cernat – Karabükspor, Çaykur Rizespor 2010–12, 2013–14
- Marius Cheregi – Samsunspor 1993–94
- Alexandru Cicâldău – Galatasaray, Konyaspor 2021–24
- Marius Coporan – Altay 1997
- Ionel Dănciulescu – Altay 1997
- Ilie Datcu – Fenerbahçe, Giresunspor 1969–76
- Nicolae Dică – Manisaspor 2010
- Silvian Dobre – Samsunspor 1993
- **Iustin Doicaru** – **Çaykur Rizespor** 2026–
- Denis Drăguș – Gaziantep, Trabzonspor, Eyüpspor 2023–2026
- Iordan Eftimie – Zeytinburnuspor 1990–91
- Iulian Filipescu – Galatasaray 1996–99
- Cornel Frăsineanu – Bursaspor 2003–04, 2006–07
- Valerică Găman – Karabükspor 2016–18
- Ionel Ganea – Bursaspor 2003–04
- Valentin Gheorghe – Ümraniyespor 2022–23
- Gheorghe Grozav – Karabükspor, Bursaspor 2017–18
- Gheorghe Hagi – Galatasaray 1996–2001
- **Ianis Hagi** – **Alanyaspor** 2025–
- Ovidiu Hanganu – Samsunspor 1993
- Ioan Hora – Konyaspor, Akhisar Belediyespor 2016–17
- Adrian Ilie – Galatasaray, Beşiktaş 1996–98, 2003–04
- **Matei Ilie** – **Kasımpaşa** 2026–
- Sabin Ilie – Fenerbahçe, Kocaelispor 1996–98
- Giani Kiriță – Samsunspor, Gaziantepspor, Ankaragücü, Bursaspor 2003–11
- Viorel Kraus – Altay 1969–70
- Iasmin Latovlevici – Gençlerbirliği, Karabükspor, Galatasaray, Bursaspor 2015–19
- Constantin Luca – Samsunspor 1993–94
- Silviu Lung Jr. – Kayserispor 2017–2022
- Ioan Lupescu – Bursaspor 2000
- Ionuț Luțu – Galatasaray 1998
- Marius Măldărășanu – Beşiktaş 2003
- Ciprian Marica – Konyaspor 2014–15
- Cosmin Matei – Gençlerbirliği 2016–17
- **Alexandru Maxim** – **Gaziantep**, Beşiktaş 2019–
- **Valentin Mihăilă** – **Çaykur Rizespor** 2025–
- Iulian Miu – Bursaspor 2003–04
- Dănuț Moisescu – Altay 1997
- **Horațiu Moldovan** – **Eyüpspor** 2026–
- Viorel Moldovan – Fenerbahçe 1998–2000
- Olimpiu Moruțan – Galatasaray, MKE Ankaragücü 2021–22, 2023–24
- Ion Motroc – Altay 1969–70
- Radu Niculescu – Galatasaray, MKE Ankaragücü 2001–02
- Florin Niță – Gaziantep 2023–24
- Gheorghe Nițu – Bursaspor 1990–92
- Ion Nunweiller – Fenerbahçe 1968–70
- Lică Nunweiller – Beşiktaş 1969
- Vasile Oană – MKE Ankaragücü 1998
- Daniel Pancu – Beşiktaş, Bursaspor 2002–08
- Costel Pantilimon – Denizlispor 2020–21
- Paul Papp – Karabükspor, Sivasspor 2017–20
- Ovidiu Petre – Galatasaray 2003–05
- Daniel Popa – Gençlerbirliği 2025–26
- Gheorghe Popescu – Galatasaray 1997–01
- Octavian Popescu – Mersin İdmanyurdu 1969–71
- Florin Prunea – Erzurumspor 1998–99
- George Puşcaş – Bodrum 2024–25
- Valeriu Răchită – MKE Ankaragücü 1999
- Denis Radu – Eyüpspor 2025–26
- Iosif Rotariu – Galatasaray, Bakırköyspor 1990–93
- Mircea Rednic – Bursaspor 1990–91
- **Dorin Rotariu** – **Eyüpspor** 2025–
- Raul Rusescu – Osmanlıspor 2015–17
- Cristian Săpunaru – Kayserispor, Denizlispor, Kayserispor 2017–21
- Mircea Sasu – Fenerbahçe 1970–71
- **Deian Sorescu** – **Gaziantep** 2023–
- Bogdan Stancu – Galatasaray, Orduspor, Gençlerbirliği, Bursaspor, Gençlerbirliği 2010–21
- Dumitru Stângaciu – Vanspor, Kocaelispor 1995–2000
- **Florin Ștefan** – **Gaziantep** 2026–
- Marius Ștefănescu – Konyaspor 2025–26
- Bogdan Stelea – Samsunspor 1994–95
- Leonard Strizu – Kayseri Erciyesspor, Sakaryaspor 1997–99
- Gabriel Tamaș – Galatasaray 2003–04
- Cristian Tănase – Sivasspor, Karabükspor 2016–18
- Florin Tene – Karabükspor 1997–98
- Daniel Timofte – Samsunspor 1993–99
- Dan Topolinschi – Adana Demirspor, Bakırköyspor 1991–93
- Gabriel Torje – Konyaspor, Osmanlıspor, Karabükspor 2014–17
- Alin Toșca – Gaziantep 2019–23
- Claudiu Vaișcovici – Bursaspor 1990–91
- Adrian Văsâi – Vanspor 1995–96
- Bogdan Vintilă – Bursaspor 2003–04

== Russia ==
- Sergei Agashkov – MKE Ankaragücü 1993-94
- **Aleksey Batrakov** – **Galatasaray** 2026–
- Vladimir Beschastnykh – Fenerbahçe 2003
- Fyodor Chalov – Kayserispor 2025–26
- Vitali Dyakov – Sivasspor 2017–18
- Georgi Dzhikiya – Antalyaspor 2025–26
- Artem Dzyuba – Adana Demirspor 2022
- Ilshat Fayzulin – Altay S.K. 2000
- Vyacheslav Kamoltsev – Kocaelispor 2000
- Dmitri Khlestov – Beşiktaş 2000–02
- Arsen Khubulov – Erzurumspor 2018–19
- Andrei Krivov – Gaziantepspor 2000–01
- Fyodor Kudryashov – İstanbul Başakşehir, Antalyaspor 2018–23
- Yuri Lodygin – Gaziantep 2019–20
- Denis Makarov – Kayserispor 2025–26
- Yuri Matveyev – MKE Ankaragücü 1993–94
- Vyacheslav Melnikov – MKE Ankaragücü 1997
- Mukhsin Mukhamadiev – MKE Ankaragücü 1993–94
- Roman Neustädter – Fenerbahçe 2016–19
- German Onugkha – Kayserispor 2025–26
- Magomed Ozdoev — Fatih Karagümrük 2022–23
- Zaur Sadayev – Ankaragücü 2018–20
- Oleg Salenko – İstanbulspor 1996–97
- Magomed-Shapi Suleymanov – Giresunspor 2021–22

== Rwanda ==
- Gerard Gohou – Kasımpaşa 2019–21
- Désiré Mbonabucya – Gaziantepspor 1997–2000

== São Tomé and Príncipe ==
- Luís Leal – Gaziantepspor 2015

== Scotland ==
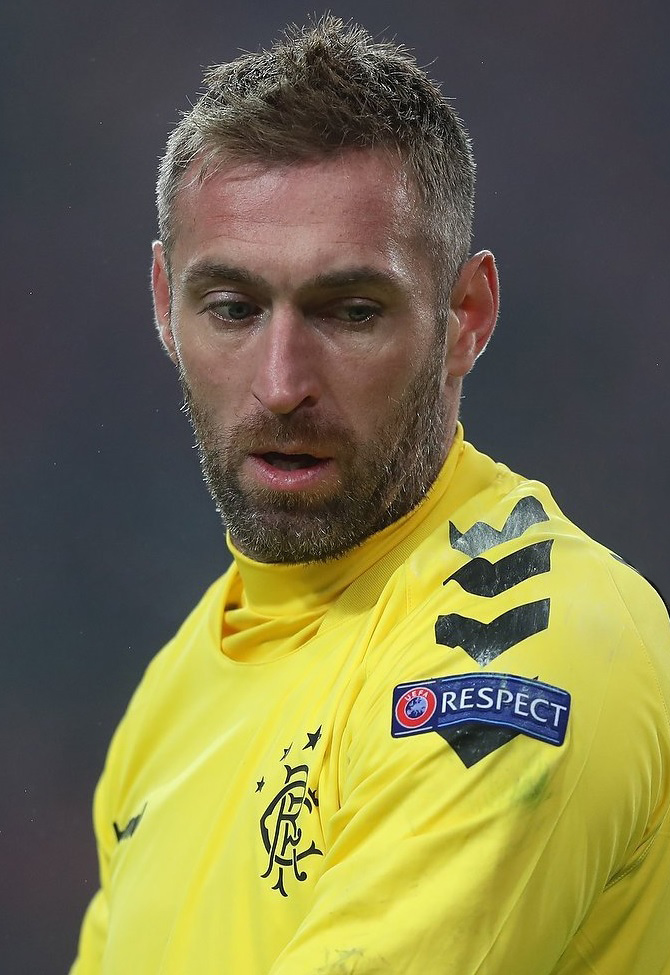
Allan McGregor

- **David Bates** – **Amedspor** 2026–
- Kris Boyd – Eskişehirspor 2011–12
- Barry Douglas – Konyaspor 2016–17
- **Zak Jules** – **Eyüpspor** 2026–
- Steve Mallan – Yeni Malatyaspor 2020–22
- Allan McGregor – Beşiktaş 2012–13
- **Adedire Mebude** – **Çaykur Rizespor** 2025–
- Kenny Miller – Bursaspor 2010–11
- Maurice Ross – Kocaelispor 2009
- Michael Stewart – Gençlerbirliği 2010–11
- **Elliot Watt** – **Samsunspor** 2026–
- Ian Wilson – Beşiktaş 1989–90

== Senegal ==
- Abdoulaye Ba – Fenerbahçe, Alanyaspor 2015–17
- Demba Ba – Beşiktaş, Göztepe SK, İstanbul Başakşehir FK 2014–15, 2016–21
- **Ousseynou Ba** – **İstanbul Başakşehir** 2023–
- Khouma Babacar – Alanyaspor 2020–22
- Aliou Badji – MKE Ankaragücü, Gaziantep 2020–21, 2023–24
- Stéphane Badji – İstanbul Başakşehir 2015–16
- Ibrahima Baldé – Giresunspor 2021–22
- Keita Baldé – Sivasspor 2024–25
- Pape Abou Cissé – Adana Demirspor 2023–24
- Papiss Cissé – Alanyaspor, Fenerbahçe, Çaykur Rizespor 2018–22
- Racine Coly – İstanbulspor 2023–24
- Famara Diédhiou – Alanyaspor 2021–23
- Issiar Dia – Fenerbahçe 2010–12
- Lamine Diack – MKE Ankaragücü, Hatayspor 2022–23, 2024–25
- Fallou Diagne – Konyaspor 2018–20
- **Mbaye Diagne** – Kasımpaşa, Galatasaray, Fatih Karagümrük, **Amedspor** 2017–23, 2026–
- Pape Diakhaté – Kayseri Erciyesspor 2014, 2015
- Mamadou Diallo – Zeytinburnuspor 1996–97
- Lamine Diarra – Antalyaspor 2012–17
- Mamadou Diarra – Giresunspor 2021–22
- Lamine Diatta – Beşiktaş 2007–08
- Abdoulaye Diallo – Çaykur Rizespor 2016–17
- Cheikhou Dieng – İstanbul Başakşehir 2016–17
- Babacar Diop – Kayserispor 2012–14
- Mame Biram Diouf – Hatayspor, Konyaspor 2020–23
- Oumar Diouf – Çaykur Rizespor 2023–24
- Assane Dioussé – MKE Ankaragücü 2020–21
- Papy Djilobodji – Gaziantep, Kasımpaşa 2019–24
- **Mamadou Fall** – **Kasımpaşa** 2021–
- Jacques Faty – Sivasspor 2011–12
- Ricardo Faty – Bursaspor, MKE Ankaragücü 2015–20
- **Mame Faye** – **Çaykur Rizespor** 2023–24, 2026–
- Lamine Gassama – Alanyaspor, Göztepe 2016–21
- Bachir Gueye – Antalyaspor 2025–26
- Ibrahima Gueye – Samsunspor 2005–06
- Magaye Gueye – Adanaspor 2016–17
- **Pape Habib Guèye** – **Kasımpaşa** 2025–
- **Ismail Jakobs** – **Galatasaray** 2024–
- Diomansy Kamara – Eskişehirspor 2011–14
- Philippe Kény – İstanbul Başakşehir 2022–25
- Moussa Konaté – Sivasspor 2021–22
- Mendy Mamadou – İstanbulspor 2023–24
- Kader Mangane – Kayseri Erciyesspor 2013–14
- Victor Mendy – Bucaspor 2010–11
- **Alassane Ndao** – Fatih Karagümrük, Antalyaspor, İstanbulspor, **Konyaspor** 2020–
- Alfred N'Diaye – Bursaspor, Eskişehirspor 2011–12, 2013
- Badou Ndiaye – Osmanlıspor, Galatasaray, Trabzonspor, Fatih Karagümrük, Adana Demirspor, Pendikspor, Gaziantep 2015–21, 2022–26
- **Cherif Ndiaye** – Göztepe, Adana Demirspor, **Samsunspor** 2020–24, 2025–
- Ousmane N'Diaye – Gençlerbirliği 2017–18
- Dame N'Doye – Trabzonspor 2015–18
- Mamadou Niang – Fenerbahçe, Beşiktaş 2010–11, 2013
- M'Baye Niang – Adana Demirspor, Gençlerbirliği 2023–24, 2025–26
- Baye Oumar Niasse – Akhisar Belediyespor 2013–14
- **Cheikh Niasse** – **Gençlerbirliği** 2026–
- Joher Rassoul – Adana Demirspor, Alanyaspor, Pendikspor 2021–24
- Henri Saivet – Sivasspor, Bursaspor 2017–19
- Diafra Sakho – Bursaspor 2018–19
- Bouly Sambou – Konyaspor 2023–24
- Tidiane Sane – Elazığspor 2013–14
- Younousse Sankharé – Giresunspor 2021–22
- Mohamed Sarr – Galatasaray 2002–03
- Faustin Senghor – Giresunspor 2022–23
- Ibrahima Sonko – Akhisar Belediyespor – 12–15
- Moussa Sow – Fenerbahçe 2012–15, 2016–17
- Pape Habib Sow – Elazığspor 2013–14
- **Abdou Khadre Sy** – **Eyüpspor** 2025–
- Tony Sylva – Trabzonspor 2008–10
- Khaly Thiam – Gaziantepspor 2017
- **Mame Baba Thiam** – Kasımpaşa, Fenerbahçe, Kayserispor, Pendikspor, Eyüpspor, **Çorum** 2019–
- Zargo Touré – Trabzonspor, Gençlerbirliği 2018–21

== Serbia ==
- Luka Adžić – MKE Ankaragücü 2020–21
- Duško Ajder – MKE Ankaragücü 1990–91
- Danijel Aleksić – Yeni Malatyaspor, İstanbul Başakşehir, Konyaspor 2018–26
- Dušan Anđelković – Kocaelispor 2008
- Darko Anić – Siirtspor 2001
- Radomir Antić – Fenerbahçe 1976–78
- Goran Bošković – Siirtspor 2000–01
- Aleksandar Bogdanović – Erzurumspor 2000–01
- Nikola Boranijašević – Konyaspor 2024–25
- Goran Čaušić – Eskişehirspor 2012–13, 2014–16
- Filip Damjanović – Konyaspor 2023–25
- Armin Đerlek – Sivasspor 2019–20
- **Strahinja Eraković** – **Samsunspor** 2026–
- Ivan Ergić – Bursaspor 2009–11
- Naser Halitović – Boluspor 1985–90
- Saša Ilić – Galatasaray 2005–07
- Radmilo Ivančević – Fenerbahçe 1977–79
- Miodrag Ješić – Altay, Trabzonspor 1985–90, 1991–94
- Nenad Jestrović – Kocaelispor 2008–09
- Dragoslav Jevrić – Ankaraspor 2006–07
- **Marko Jevtović** – **Konyaspor**, Gaziantep 2018–21, 2022–
- Milan Jevtović – Antalyaspor 2016–18
- Miloš Jojić – İstanbul Başakşehir 2018–19
- Bojan Jorgačević – Kayseri Erciyesspor 2013–14
- Dušan Jovančić – Çaykur Rizespor 2020–21
- **Aleksandar Jovanović** – **Kocaelispor** 2025–
- Nikola Jozić – Gaziantepspor 2006
- Dragi Kaličanin – Bursaspor 1987–88
- Damir Kahriman – Konyaspor 2008
- Mateja Kežman – Fenerbahçe 2006–08
- Milorad Korać – Erzurumspor, Kocaelispor 2000–03
- Miloš Kosanović – Göztepe 2017–18
- Filip Kostić – Fenerbahçe 2024–25
- Zlatko Krmpotić – Gençlerbirliği 1986–88
- Miloš Krasić – Fenerbahçe 2012–13
- Nikola Lazetić – Fenerbahçe 2000–02
- Darko Lazić – Alanyaspor 2016–17
- Dejan Lekić – Gençlerbirliği 2012–13
- Lazar Lemić – Fenerbahçe 1966–67
- Adem Ljajić – Beşiktaş, Fatih Karagümrük 2018–24
- Živan Ljukovčan – Fenerbahçe 1986–88
- Milan Lukač – Akhisar Belediyespor 2015–19
- Nikola Maksimović – Hatayspor 2023–24
- Lazar Marković – Fenerbahçe, Gaziantep, Trabzonspor 2015–16, 2022–24
- Miloš Mihajlov – Konyaspor 2008–09
- Srđan Mijailović – Kayserispor 2013–14, 2015–17
- Đorđe Milić – Adanaspor, Beşiktaş 1971–75
- Marko Milinković – Gençlerbirliği 2016–18
- Nemanja Milunović – Alanyaspor 2021–22
- Miško Mirković (Mert Meriç) – Kocaelispor, Fenerbahçe, Elazığspor 1992–2003
- Zoran Mirković – Fenerbahçe 2000–03
- Milan Mitrović – Mersin İdmanyurdu 2013, 2014–16
- Filip Mladenović – Fatih Karagümrük 2025–26
- Danilo Nikolić – Karabükspor 2011–12
- Đorđe Nikolić – Sivasspor 2023–25
- Stevan Ostojić – Fenerbahçe 1971–73
- Sava Paunović – Beşiktaş 1977–78
- Aleksandar Pešić – Fatih Karagümrük 2021–22
- Dušan Pešić – Fenerbahçe, Sakaryaspor 1984–89
- Nikola Petković – Gençlerbirliği 2009
- Radosav Petrović – Gençlerbirliği 2012–15
- Uroš Radaković – MKE Ankaragücü, Sivasspor 2022–25
- Zoran Savić – Siirtspor 2000–01
- Marko Šćepović – Çaykur Rizespor 2019–20
- Veljko Simić – Sivasspor 2024–25
- Petar Škuletić – Gençlerbirliği, Sivasspor 2017–18, 2019–20
- Milan Smiljanić – Gençlerbirliği 2013–14
- Uroš Spajić – Kasımpaşa 2021–22
- Miloš Stanojević – MKE Ankaragücü 2020–21
- Milan Stepanov – Trabzonspor, Bursaspor, Mersin İdmanyurdu 2006–08, 2010–13
- Miladin Stevanović – Kayserispor 2016–17
- Miroslav Stević – Fenerbahçe 2002–03
- Nikola Stojiljković – Kayserispor 2017–18
- Neven Subotić – Denizlispor 2020–21
- Đorđe Tutorić – Kocaelispor 2008
- Dušan Tadić – Fenerbahçe 2023–25
- Miroslav Tanjga – Fenerbahçe 1992
- Nemanja Tomić – Gençlerbirliği 2013–16
- Duško Tošić – Gençlerbirliği, Beşiktaş, Kasımpaşa 2012–18, 2020–21
- Milijan Tupajić – Zonguldakspor, Rizespor 1985–88
- **Dušan Vlahović** – **Beşiktaş** 2026–
- Nemanja Vučićević – Manisaspor 2012
- Jagoš Vuković – Konyaspor 2013–17
- Rade Zalad – Eskişehirspor, Beşiktaş, MKE Ankaragücü 1986–93
- Marko Zorić – Gençlerbirliği 2007–08

== Sierra Leone ==
- Teteh Bangura – Bursaspor 2011–13
- Steven Caulker – Alanyaspor, Gaziantep, Fatih Karagümrük 2018–23
- Khalifa Jabbie – Balıkesirspor 2014
- Jocelyn Janneh – Kayserispor 2021–22
- Musa Kallon – Vanspor 1994–95

== Slovakia ==
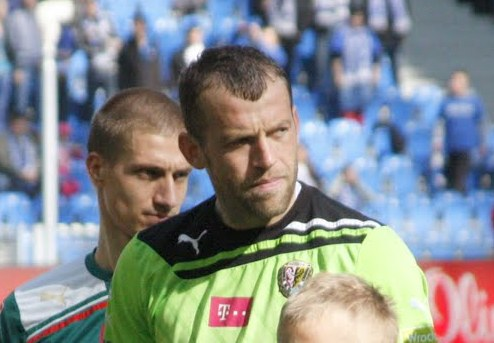
Marian Kelemen

- Miroslav Barčík – Göztepe 2001–02
- László Bénes – Kayserispor 2025–26
- Matúš Bero – Trabzonspor 2016–18
- Marek Čech – Trabzonspor 2011–13
- Juraj Czinege – Elazığspor 2002–04
- Ondrej Debnár – Elazığspor 2003–04
- David Depetris – Çaykur Rizespor 2013
- Ján Ďurica – Trabzonspor 2016–18
- Peter Grajciar – Konyaspor 2010–11
- Marek Hamšík – Trabzonspor 2021–23
- Filip Hološko – Manisaspor, Beşiktaş, İstanbul Büyükşehir Belediyespor, Çaykur Rizespor 2006–15
- Tomáš Hubočan – Trabzonspor 2017–18
- Miroslav Karhan – Beşiktaş 2000–01
- Marián Kelemen – Bursaspor 2002–03
- Miroslav König – Elazığspor 2003–04
- Roman Kratochvíl – Denizlispor, Konyaspor 2002–09
- Juraj Kucka – Trabzonspor – 2017–19
- Ivan Lietava – Denizlispor, Konyaspor 2008–09, 2010–11
- Róbert Mak – Konyaspor 2019–20
- Ľubomír Meszároš – Elazığspor, Adanaspor 2002–04
- Branislav Niňaj – Osmanlıspor 2017–18
- Vytykac Paval – Bursaspor 2002–03
- Peter Pekarík – Kayserispor 2011–12
- Erik Sabo – Fatih Karagümrük, Çaykur Rizespor 2020–22
- Marek Sapara – MKE Ankaragücü, Trabzonspor, Gaziantepspor, 2010–14
- **Ľubomír Šatka** – **Samsunspor** 2023–
- Stanislav Šesták – MKE Ankaragücü, Bursaspor 2010–14
- **Milan Škriniar** – **Fenerbahçe** 2024–
- Martin Škrtel – Fenerbahçe, İstanbul Başakşehir 2016–21
- Miloš Soboňa – Bursaspor 2002–03
- Pavol Straka – Antalyaspor 2006–07
- Tomáš Sedlák – Gaziantepspor 2007
- Štefan Senecký – Ankaraspor, MKE Ankaragücü, Sivasspor 2007–11, 2012–13
- Miroslav Stoch – Fenerbahçe, Bursaspor 2010–13, 2015–17
- Milan Timko – Kocaelispor, Adanaspor 2000–03
- Róbert Vittek – MKE Ankaragücü, Trabzonspor 2010–13
- Marián Zeman – İstanbulspor 1995–97

== Slovenia ==
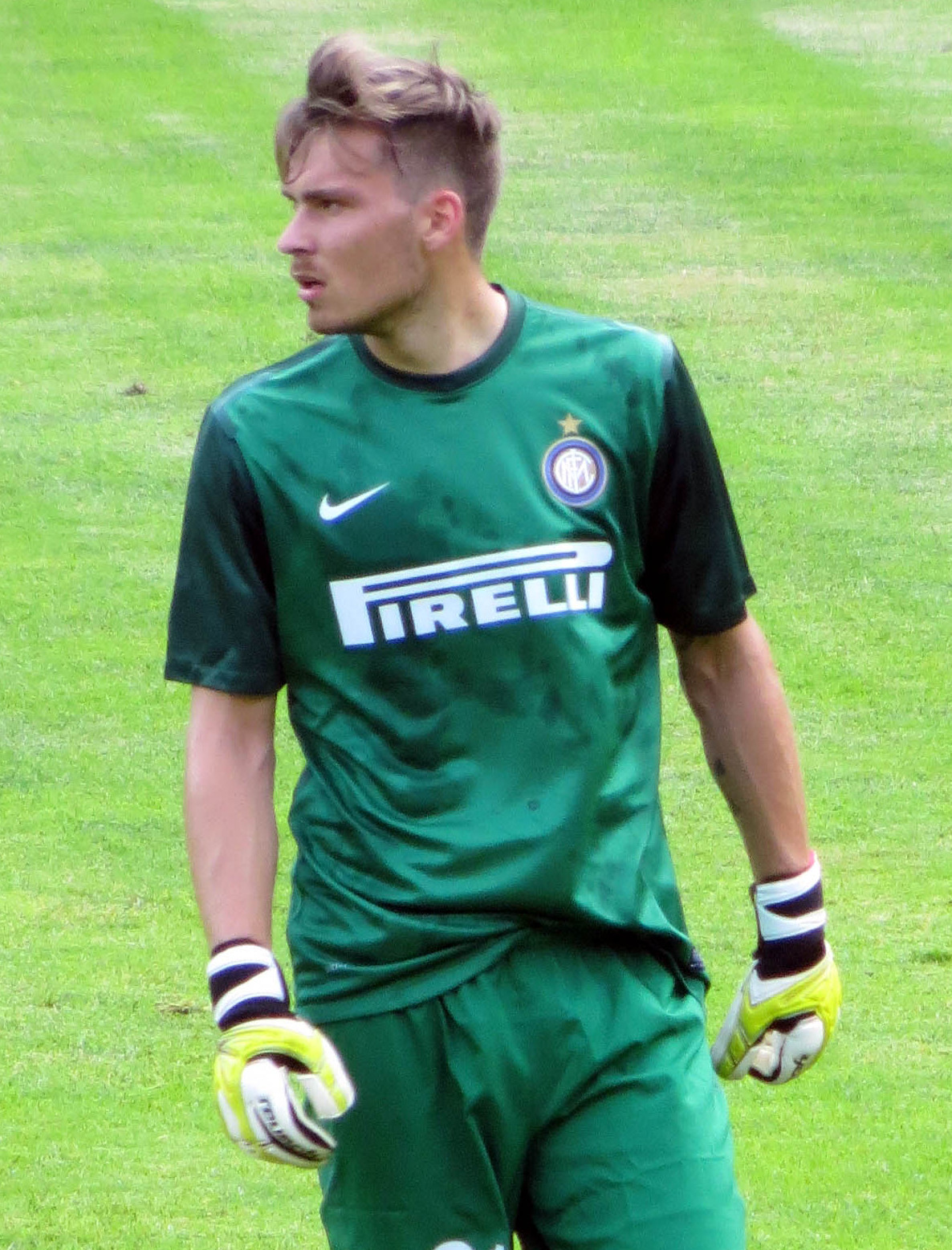
Vid Belec

- Jure Balkovec – Fatih Karagümrük, Alanyaspor 2020–26
- Vid Belec – Konyaspor 2014–15
- Boško Boškovič – Antalyaspor 1994–95
- Damir Botonjič – Gençlerbirliği 1999–04
- Matjaž Cvikl – Zeytinburnuspor 1993–95
- Matic Fink – Çaykur Rizespor 2016–17, 2018–19
- Sašo Fornezzi – Orduspor, Antalyaspor 2011–14, 2015–17
- Dragan Jelić – Çaykur Rizespor 2006–07, 2008
- Boban Jović – Bursaspor 2017–18
- Dejan Kelhar – Samsunspor 2012
- **Blaž Kramer** – **Konyaspor** 2024–
- Dejan Lazarević – Antalyaspor, Karabükspor 2015–17
- Miha Mevlja – Alanyaspor 2021–22
- Džoni Novak – Fenerbahçe 1992–93
- Milan Osterc – Bursaspor 2003–04, Malatyaspor 2004–05
- Miran Pavlin – Samsunspor 2002
- Aleksander Rodić – Kayserispor 2005–06
- Ermin Rakovič – Diyarbakırspor 2006
- Rajko Rotman – İstanbul Başakşehir, Kayserispor, Göztepe, Akhisarspor 2011–19
- Miral Samardžić – Akhisar Belediyespor 2017
- Svit Sešlar – Eyüpspor 2024–26
- Marko Simeunovič – Şekerspor 1997–99
- Nejc Skubic – Konyaspor 2016–22
- Andraž Šporar – Alanyaspor 2024–26
- Emil Šterbal – Siirtspor 2000–01
- David Tijanić – Göztepe 2018–20, 2021–22, 2024–25
- Etien Velikonja – Gençlerbirliği 2016–17
- Amedej Vetrih – Çaykur Rizespor, Gaziantep 2019–22
- Miha Zajc – Fenerbahçe 2018–20, 2021–23
- Luka Žinko – Kocaelispor 2008–09
- **Žan Žužek** – **Gençlerbirliği** 2025–

== South Africa ==
- Ryan Botha – Denizlispor 2004–07
- Elrio van Heerden – Sivasspor 2009–10
- Fani Madida – Beşiktaş, Antalyaspor, Bursaspor, Antalyaspor, Bursaspor 1992–98
- Donald Khuse – Gençlerbirliği, Antalyaspor 1993–97
- Steve Komphela – Gaziantepspor, Çanakkale Dardanelspor 1993–97
- May Mahlangu – Konyaspor 2014–15
- Lebogang Manyama – Konyaspor 2017–18
- Helman Mkhalele – Kayserispor, MKE Ankaragücü, Göztepe, Malatyaspor 1997–2000, 2001–05
- Teboho Moloi – Gaziantepspor 1993–94
- Lebogang Morula – Vanspor 1997–98
- John Moshoeu – Gençlerbirliği, Kocaelispor, Fenerbahçe, Bursaspor 1993–2003
- Pollen Ndlanya – Bursaspor, Göztepe 1996–2000
- Dino Ndlovu – Kocaelispor, Boluspor, Sakaryaspor 2021–22, 2023–
- Dumisa Ngobe – Gençlerbirliği, MKE Ankaragücü, Akçaabat Sebatspor 1999–2001, 2003–04
- David Nyathi – MKE Ankaragücü 2000
- Alfred Phiri – Gençlerbirliği, Vanspor, Samsunspor 1996–2002
- Lebogang Phiri – Çaykur Rizespor 2021–22
- Tokelo Rantie – Gençlerbirliği 2016–18
- Godfrey Sapula – MKE Ankaragücü 1999–2000
- Calvin Sosibo – MKE Ankaragücü 2009–10
- Siphiwe Tshabalala – BB Erzurumspor 2018–19

== South Korea ==
- **Hwang Ui-jo** – **Alanyaspor** 2023–
- **Jo Jin-ho** – **Konyaspor** 2025–
- Kim Do-yong – Karabükspor 1998
- Kim Min-jae – Fenerbahçe 2021–22
- Lee Eul-yong – Trabzonspor 2002–03, 2004–06
- **Oh Hyeon-gyu** – **Beşiktaş** 2025–
- Shin Young-rok – Bursaspor 2009–10
- Suk Hyun-jun – Trabzonspor 2016–17

== Spain ==
- Dani Abalo – Sivasspor 2015–16
- Agus – Orduspor 2012–13
- Alexis – Beşiktaş 2015–16
- Angeliño – Galatasaray 2023–24
- **Marco Asensio** – **Fenerbahçe** 2025–
- David Barral – Orduspor 2012–13
- Marc Bartra – Trabzonspor 2022–23
- Isaac Cuenca – Bursaspor 2015–16
- Julián Cuesta – Antalyaspor 2025–26
- **Paolo Fernandes** – **Alanyaspor** 2026–
- Joaquín Fernández – Trabzonspor 2023–24
- Dani – Denizlispor 2007
- Jordi Figueras – Eskişehirspor 2016
- Carlos García – Alanyaspor 2016–17
- Daniel Güiza – Fenerbahçe 2008–11
- Guti – Beşiktaş 2010–11
- Jorge Félix – Sivasspor 2020–22
- Josico – Fenerbahçe 2008–09
- Juanfran (1976) – Beşiktaş 2004–05
- Juanfran (1988) – Alanyaspor 2019–22
- Juan Mata – Galatasaray 2022–23
- Álvaro Mejía – Konyaspor 2011–12
- Javi Montero – Beşiktaş 2020–23
- Álvaro Morata – Galatasaray 2024–25
- Álvaro Negredo – Beşiktaş 2017–18
- Iñaki Peña – Galatasaray 2021–22
- **Luis Pérez** – **Gaziantep** 2025–
- Pinchi – Çaykur Rizespor 2023–24
- Alejandro Pozuelo – Konyaspor 2022–23
- Fabricio Agosto Ramírez – Beşiktaş 2016–18
- Albert Riera – Galatasaray 2011–13
- José Rodríguez – Galatasaray 2015–16
- José Rodríguez – Adana Demirspor 2023–25
- Jaime Romero – Orduspor 2013
- Víctor Ruiz – Beşiktaş 2019–20
- Enric Saborit – Gaziantep 2024–25
- Borja Sainz – Giresunspor 2022–23
- **Samuel Sáiz** – Sivasspor, **Eyüpspor** 2022–
- Roberto Soldado – Fenerbahçe 2017–19
- **Mahamadou Susoho** – **Kocaelispor** 2025–
- Fernando Varela – Kasımpaşa 2010–11
- Vitolo – Elazığspor 2013

== Suriname ==
- **Myenty Abena** – **Gaziantep** 2025–
- Roland Alberg – Elazığspor 2012–14
- Diego Biseswar – Kayserispor 2012–14, 2015–16
- Tjaronn Chery – Kayserispor 2018–19
- Stefano Denswil – Trabzonspor, Kayserispor 2021–26
- **Anfernee Dijksteel** – **Kocaelispor** 2025–
- Mitchell Donald – Yeni Malatyaspor, BB Erzurumspor 2018–21
- Ryan Donk – Kasımpaşa, Galatasaray 2013–16, 2017–23
- Leandro Kappel – Altay, Pendikspor – 2021–22, 2023–24
- **Gyrano Kerk** – **Erzurumspor** 2026–
- Kenneth Paal – Antalyaspor 2025–26

== Sweden ==
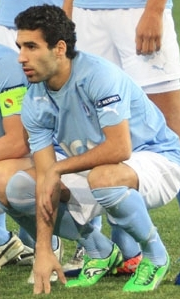
Jimmy Durmaz

- Kennet Andersson – Fenerbahçe 2000–02
- Mattias Asper – Beşiktaş 2002
- Ferhad Ayaz – Gaziantepspor 2015–16
- Mattias Bjärsmyr – Sivasspor, Gençlerbirliği 2017–20
- Eric Björkander – Altay 2021–22
- Patrik Carlgren – Konyaspor 2017–18
- Mervan Çelik – Gençlerbirliği, Akhisar Belediyespor 2013–17
- Johan Dahlin – Gençlerbirliği 2014
- Alper Demirol – Fatih Karagümrük 2025–26
- Panajotis Dimitriadis – Gençlerbirliği 2015–16
- Jimmy Durmaz – Gençlerbirliği, Galatasaray, Fatih Karagümrük 2012–14, 2019–22
- Johan Elmander – Galatasaray 2011–13
- Labinot Harbuzi – Gençlerbirliği, Manisaspor 2009–12
- Samuel Holmén – İstanbul Büyükşehir Belediyespor, Fenerbahçe, Bursaspor, Konyaspor, İstanbul Başakşehir 2010–17
- Sebastian Holmén – Çaykur Rizespor 2021–22
- Johannes Hopf – Gençlerbirliği, MKE Ankaragücü 2015–19
- Andreas Isaksson – Kasımpaşa 2012–16
- Mattias Johansson – Gençlerbirliği 2020–21
- Abdul Khalili – Mersin İdmanyurdu, Gençlerbirliği, Kasımpaşa 2014–20
- Isaac Kiese Thelin – Kasımpaşa 2020–21
- Emir Kujović – Kayserispor, Elazığspor 2011–13
- Daniel Larsson – Gaziantepspor, Akhisar Belediyespor 2015–19
- Sam Larsson – Antalyaspor, Fatih Karagümrük 2022–26
- Tobias Linderoth – Galatasaray 2007–09
- Roger Ljung – Galatasaray 1993–94
- Roland Magnusson – Altay 1967–69
- **Joe Mendes** – **Samsunspor** 2025–
- Alexander Milošević – Beşiktaş 2015–16
- Kristoffer Nordfeldt – Gençlerbirliği 2019–21
- **Marcus Rafferty** – **Kasımpaşa** 2026–
- Jonathan Ring – Gençlerbirliği 2017
- Fredrik Risp – Gençlerbirliği, Trabzonspor, Ankaraspor, MKE Ankaragücü 2005–09
- Marcus Rohdén – Fatih Karagümrük 2023–24
- Besard Sabovic – Kayserispor 2020–21
- Adam Ståhl – Karabükspor 2017–18
- Carlos Strandberg – Hatayspor 2023–25
- Gustav Svensson – Bursaspor 2010–12
- Erkan Zengin – Beşiktaş, Eskişehirspor, Trabzonspor 2008–16

== Switzerland ==
- Albian Ajeti – Gaziantep 2023–24
- **Alexis Antunes** – **Göztepe** 2025–
- Musa Araz – Konyaspor 2017–18
- Kemal Ademi – Fenerbahçe, Fatih Karagümrük 2020–21
- **Samuel Ballet** – Antalyaspor, **Amedspor** 2025–
- Nassim Ben Khalifa – Eskişehirspor 2015
- Eren Derdiyok – Kasımpaşa, Galatasaray, Göztepe 2014–20
- Blerim Džemaili – Galatasaray 2014–15
- Johan Djourou – Antalyaspor 2017–18
- Michael Frey – Fenerbahçe 2018–19
- Mario Gavranović – Kayserispor 2021–23
- Levent Gülen – Kayserispor 2013–14, 2016–20
- Anel Husić – Gaziantep 2024–25
- Gökhan Inler – Beşiktaş, İstanbul Başakşehir, Adana Demirspor 2016–20, 2021–23
- Adrian Knup – Galatasaray 1996
- Christopher Lungoyi – Gaziantep 2024–26
- Admir Mehmedi – Antalyaspor 2021–23
- François Moubandje – Alanyaspor, Göztepe 2020–22
- Ridge Munsy – Erzurumspor – 2018–19
- Kubilay Türkyilmaz – Galatasaray 1993–95
- Hakan Yakin – Galatasaray 2005
- Murat Yakin – Fenerbahçe 1998–99
- Reto Ziegler – Fenerbahçe 2011–13

== Syria ==
- Aias Aosman – Pendikspor 2023–24
- Sanharib Malki – Kasımpaşa 2013–16

== Tanzania ==
- **Novatus Miroshi** – **Göztepe** 2024–
- Mbwana Samatta – Fenerbahçe 2020–22

== Togo ==
- Emmanuel Adebayor – İstanbul Başakşehir F.K., Kayserispor 2017–19
- Serge Akakpo – Trabzonspor 2016–17
- Floyd Ayité – Gençlerbirliği 2019–21
- Jonathan Ayité – Alanyaspor 2016–17
- Arafat Djako – Gaziantepspor 2011
- Matthieu Dossevi – Denizlispor 2020–21
- Hamílton – Ankaraspor 2007–08
- Franck Mawuena – Gençlerbirliği 2011–12
- Gilles Sunu – Erzurumspor 2018–20

== Trinidad and Tobago ==
- John Bostock – Bursaspor – 2017–18
- Darryl Roberts – Denizlispor 2008–11

== Tunisia ==
- Aymen Abdennour – Kayserispor 2019–20
- **Adem Arous** – **Kasımpaşa** 2025–
- Zoubeir Baya – Beşiktaş 2001–02
- **Omar Ben Ali** – **Alanyaspor** 2026–
- Änis Ben-Hatira – Gaziantepspor 2017
- Ayman Ben Mohamed – Denizlispor 2020–21
- **Mortadha Ben Ouanes** – **Kasımpaşa** 2021–
- Wissem Ben Yahia – Mersin İdmanyurdu 2011–13
- Syam Ben Youssef – Kasımpaşa, Denizlispor 2017–20
- Adel Bettaieb – Ümraniyespor 2022–23
- **Salem Bouajila** – **Göztepe** 2025–
- Riadh Bouazizi – Bursaspor, Gaziantepspor, Kayseri Erciyesspor 2000–07
- Ghailene Chaalali – Yeni Malatyaspor 2019–20
- **Amin Cherni** – **Göztepe** 2025–
- Jeremy Dudziak – Hatayspor 2022–23
- Kaies Ghodhbane – Diyarbakırspor, Samsunspor, Konyaspor 2003–06
- Oussama Haddadi – Kasımpaşa, Yeni Malatyaspor 2019–22
- Mohamed Larbi – Samsunspor 2017–18
- Sofiane Melliti – Gaziantepspor 2006
- Yassine Meriah – Kasımpaşa, Çaykur Rizespor 2019–21
- Mootaz Nourani – Adana Demirspor 2023–25
- Al Fahem Riadh – Denizlispor 1987–88
- Montassar Talbi – Çaykur Rizespor 2018–21
- Nabil Taïder – Sivasspor 2009–10
- Mohamed Ali Yacoubi – Çaykur Rizespor 2016–17
- Ali Zitouni – Antalyaspor 2006–07, 2008–12

== Turkmenistan ==
- Alexey Kozlov – Gençlerbirliği 1992–93
- Ravshan Mukhadov – Gençlerbirliği 1992–93
- Sergey Agashkov – MKE Ankaragücü 1993–94
- Charyar Mukhadov – MKE Ankaragücü 1993–94

== Uganda ==
- Farouk Miya – Konyaspor 2019–21
- Majid Musisi – Bursaspor, Çanakkale Dardanelspor 1994–96, 1997–99
- Uche Ikpeazu – Konyaspor 2022–23

== Ukraine ==
- **Arseniy Batahov** – **Trabzonspor** 2024–
- Serhiy Bezhenar – Erzurumspor 1999–2000
- Andriy Bliznichenko – Karabükspor 2017–18
- Andriy Boryachuk – Çaykur Rizespor 2019–20
- Denys Boyko – Beşiktaş 2016
- Bogdan Butko – BB Erzurumspor 2020–21
- Oleksandr Hladkyy – Çaykur Rizespor 2018–19
- Viktor Hryshko – Trabzonspor 1993–95
- Yuriy Kalitvintsev – Trabzonspor 1998–99
- Oleksandr Karavayev – Fenerbahçe 2016–17
- Anton Kravchenko – Karabükspor 2017–18
- Artem Kravets – Kayserispor, Konyaspor 2017–22
- Oleksandr Kucher – Kayserispor 2017–19
- Vladyslav Kulach – Eskişehirspor 2016
- Volodymyr Lyutyi – Bursaspor 1993
- **Ruslan Malinovskyi** – **Trabzonspor** 2026–
- Volodymyr Matsyhura – Kocaelispor 2000
- Artem Milevskyi – Gaziantepspor 2013
- Mykola Morozyuk – Çaykur Rizespor 2018–21
- Oleksandr Petrusenko – Antalyaspor 2024–25
- Yaroslav Rakitskyi – Adana Demirspor 2022–23
- Serhii Rebrov – Fenerbahçe 2003–04
- Serhiy Rybalka – Sivasspor 2017–21
- Oleksandr Rybka – Karabükspor 2017–18
- Yevhen Seleznyov – Karabükspor, Akhisar Belediyespor 2017–19
- Danylo Sikan – Trabzonspor 2024–26
- Taras Stepanenko – Eyüpspor 2024–26
- Oleksandr Syrota – Kocaelispor 2025–26
- Ivan Vyshnevskyi – Fenerbahçe, Sarıyer 1989–92
- Oleksandr Zubkov – Trabzonspor 2024–26

== United Arab Emirates ==
- **Richard Akonnor** – **Göztepe** 2026–

== United States ==
- Freddy Adu – Çaykur Rizespor 2010–11
- Jozy Altidore – Bursaspor 2010–11
- Gboly Ariyibi – MKE Ankaragücü 2022–23
- Tyler Boyd – Ankaragücü, Beşiktaş, Sivasspor, Çaykur Rizespor 2018–23
- Mix Diskerud – Denizlispor 2020–21
- Maurice Edu – Bursaspor 2012–13
- Brad Friedel – Galatasaray 1995–96
- Jermaine Jones – Beşiktaş 2013–14
- Eric Lichaj – Fatih Karagümrük 2020–21
- Haji Wright – Antalyaspor 2021–23
- DeAndre Yedlin – Galatasaray 2020–22

== Uruguay ==
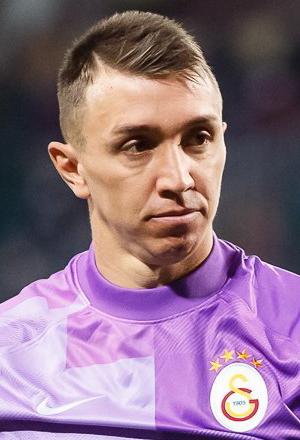
Fernando Muslera

- Ramón Arias – Giresunspor 2022–23
- Andrés Fleurquin – Galatasaray 2001–02
- Santiago García – Kasımpaşa 2012–13
- Maxi Gómez – Trabzonspor 2022–24
- Andrés Lamas – MKE Ankaragücü 2007–08
- Mauricio Lemos – Fenerbahçe 2020–21, 2022–23
- Diego Lugano – Fenerbahçe 2006–11
- Marcelo Méndez – Kayserispor 2006–07
- Sergio Órteman – İstanbul Büyükşehir Belediyespor 2007
- Fernando Muslera – Galatasaray 2011–25
- Pablo Pintos – Kasımpaşa 2012–13
- Sergio Rochet – Sivasspor 2017–18
- Diego Rossi – Fenerbahçe 2021–23
- Marcelo Saracchi – Galatasaray 2019–21
- David Texeira – Sivasspor 2015–16
- **Lucas Torreira** – **Galatasaray** 2022–
- Tabaré Viúdez – Kasımpaşa 2012–15
- Marcelo Zalayeta – Kayserispor 2010–11

== Uzbekistan ==
- **Husniddin Aliqulov** – **Çaykur Rizespor** 2023–
- **Abbosbek Fayzullaev** – **İstanbul Başakşehir** 2025–
- **Eldor Shomurodov** – **İstanbul Başakşehir** 2025–
- Otabek Shukurov – Fatih Karagümrük, Kayserispor 2022–24
- Azizbek Turgunboev – Sivasspor 2023–25

== Venezuela ==
- Wilker Ángel – Göztepe 2021–22
- Sergio Córdova – Alanyaspor 2023–25
- Yonathan Del Valle – Kasımpaşa, Bursaspor 2015–17
- Jhon Murillo – Kasımpaşa 2017–18
- **Jesús Ramírez** – **Çorum** 2026–
- Gelmin Rivas – MKE Ankaragücü 2019–20
- Jobanny Rivero – Konyaspor 2005–06
- Renny Vega – Bursaspor, Denizlispor 2007–09
- Ronald Vargas – Balıkesirspor 2014–15

== Wales ==
- Dean Saunders – Galatasaray 1995–96

== Zambia ==
- Evans Kangwa – Gaziantepspor 2016–17
- Chisamba Lungu – Alanyaspor 2017–18
- Collins Mbesuma – Bursaspor 2007–08

== Zimbabwe ==
- Teenage Hadebe – Yeni Malatyaspor, Konyaspor 2019–21, 2023–24
- Norman Mapeza – Galatasaray, MKE Ankaragücü, Altay, Çanakkale Dardanelspor, Malatyaspor 1994–2000, 2001–02
- Shingayi Kaondera – Gaziantepspor 2005–06
- Joseph Ngwenya – Antalyaspor 2008–09

== Notes ==
1. Born in Algeria
2. Born in Angola
3. Born in Argentina
4. Born in Australia
5. Born in Austria
6. Born in Belarus (then part of the Soviet Union)
7. Born in Belgium
8. Born in Bosnia and Herzegovina
9. Born in Bosnia and Herzegovina (then part of SFR Yugoslavia)
10. Born in Brazil
11. Born in Burkina Faso
12. Born in Burundi
13. Born in Cameroon
14. Born in Cape Verde
15. Born in Croatia
16. Born in Croatia (then part of SFR Yugoslavia)
17. Born in the Democratic Republic of Congo
18. Born in the Democratic Republic of Congo (then Zaïre)
19. Born in Denmark
20. Born in England
21. Born in Finland
22. Born in France
23. Born in French Guiana (Overseas department of the French Republic)
24. Born in Gambia
25. Born in Germany
26. Born in Ghana
27. Born in Guinea-Bissau
28. Born in Italy
29. Born in Ivory Coast
30. Born in Kenya
31. Born in Kosovo
32. Born in Kosovo (then part of SFR Yugoslavia)
33. Born in Morocco
34. Born in Martinique (Overseas department of the French Republic)
35. Born in Montenegro (then SFR Yugoslavia)
36. Born in Mozambique (then Portuguese Mozambique)
37. Born in the Netherlands
38. Born in New Zealand
39. Born in Nigeria
40. Born in Norway
41. Born in North Macedonia
42. Born in North Macedonia (then part of SFR Yugoslavia)
43. Born in Poland
44. Born in Portugal
45. Born in Russia
46. Born in Russia (then part of the Soviet Union)
47. Born in São Tomé and Príncipe
48. Born in Saudi Arabia
49. Born in Senegal
50. Born in Serbia (then SFR Yugoslavia)
51. Born in Serbia (then FR Yugoslavia)
52. Born in Sierra Leone
53. Born in Slovakia
54. Born in Slovakia (then part of Czechoslovakia)
55. Born in Slovenia (then SFR Yugoslavia)
56. Born in Somalia
57. Born in South Africa
58. Born in Spain
59. Born in Suriname
60. Born in Sweden
61. Born in Switzerland
62. Born in Tajikistan (then part of the Soviet Union)
63. Born in Togo
64. Born in Turkey
65. Born in Uganda
66. Born in Ukraine (then part of the Soviet Union)
67. Born in the USA
68. Born in West Germany (now part of Germany)
69. Capped for the Albania national football team
70. Capped for the Albania national under-21 football team
71. Capped for the Albania national under-19 football team
72. Capped for the Albania national under-18 football team
73. Capped for the Albania national under-17 football team
74. Capped for the Argentina national football team
75. Capped for the Argentina national under-20 football team
76. Capped for the Austria national under-21 football team
77. Capped for the Austria national under-20 football team
78. Capped for the Austria national under-19 football team
79. Capped for the Belarus national under-16 football team
80. Capped for the Belgium national under-23 football team
81. Capped for the Belgium national under-21 football team
82. Capped for the Belgium national under-20 football team
83. Capped for the Belgium national under-19 football team
84. Capped for the Belgium national under-18 football team
85. Capped for the Belgium national under-17 football team
86. Capped for the Belgium national under-16 football team
87. Capped for the Belgium national under-15 football team
88. Capped for the Benin national football B team
89. Capped for the Brazil national under-17 football team
90. Capped for the Cameroon B national football team
91. Capped for the Cameroon national under-20 football team
92. Capped for the Catalonia national football team
93. Capped for the Congo national football team
94. Capped for the Croatia national under-20 football team
95. Capped for the DR Congo national under-20 football team
96. Capped for the England national football team
97. Capped for the England C national football team
98. Capped for the England national under-21 football team
99. Capped for the England national under-19 football team
100. Capped for the England national under-17 football team
101. Capped for the England national under-16 football team
102. Capped for the Finland national under-17 football team
103. Capped for the France national football team
104. Capped for the France Olympic football team
105. Capped for the France national under-21 football team
106. Capped for the France national under-20 football team
107. Capped for the France national under-19 football team
108. Capped for the France national under-18 football team
109. Capped for the France national under-17 football team
110. Capped for the France national under-16 football team
111. Capped for the French Guiana national football team
112. Capped for the Germany national football team
113. Capped for the Germany national under-21 football team
114. Capped for the Germany national under-20 football team
115. Capped for the Germany national under-19 football team
116. Capped for the Germany national under-18 football team
117. Capped for the Germany national under-17 football team
118. Capped for the Germany national under-16 football team
119. Capped for the Germany national under-15 football team
120. Capped for the Great Britain men's Olympic football team
121. Capped for the Greece national under-21 football team
122. Capped for the Ivory Coast national under-23 football team
123. Capped for the Ivory Coast national under-20 football team
124. Capped for the Ivory Coast national under-19 football team
125. Capped for the Ivory Coast national under-17 football team
126. Capped for the Kosovo national football team
127. Capped for the Kosovo national under-21 football team
128. Capped for the Kosovo national under-19 football team
129. Capped for the Luxembourg national under-19 football team
130. Capped for the Luxembourg national under-17 football team
131. Capped for the Martinique national football team
132. Capped for the Montenegro national under-21 football team
133. Capped for the Morocco national football team
134. Capped for the Netherlands national football team
135. Capped for the Netherlands national under-21 football team
136. Capped for the Netherlands national under-20 football team
137. Capped for the Netherlands national under-19 football team
138. Capped for the Netherlands national under-18 football team
139. Capped for the Netherlands national under-17 football team
140. Capped for the Netherlands national under-16 football team
141. Capped for the Netherlands national under-15 football team
142. Capped for the New Zealand national football team
143. Capped for the New Zealand national under-20 football team
144. Capped for the North Macedonia national football team
145. Capped for the North Macedonia national under-21 football team
146. Capped for the North Macedonia national under-19 football team
147. Capped for the North Macedonia national under-18 football team
148. Capped for the North Macedonia national under-17 football team
149. Capped for the North Macedonia national under-15 football team
150. Capped for the Northern Cyprus national football team
151. Capped for the Norway national under-21 football team
152. Capped for the Norway national under-20 football team
153. Capped for the Norway national under-19 football team
154. Capped for the Norway national under-18 football team
155. Capped for the Norway national under-17 football team
156. Capped for the Norway national under-16 football team
157. Capped for the Norway national under-15 football team
158. Capped for the Portugal national football team
159. Capped for the Portugal national under-23 football team
160. Capped for the Portugal national under-21 football team
161. Capped for the Portugal national under-20 football team
162. Capped for the Portugal national under-19 football team
163. Capped for the Portugal national under-18 football team
164. Capped for the Portugal national under-17 football team
165. Capped for the Portugal national under-16 football team
166. Capped for the Portugal national under-15 football team
167. Capped for the Russia national under-21 football team
168. Capped for the Russia national under-19 football team
169. Capped for the Russia national under-18 football team
170. Capped for the Russia national under-17 football team
171. Capped for the Russia national under-16 football team
172. Capped for the Serbia national under-17 football team
173. Capped for the Serbia national under-19 football team
174. Capped for the Serbia and Montenegro national football team
175. Capped for the Serbia and Montenegro national under-21 football team
176. Capped for the Serbia and Montenegro national under-18 football team
177. Capped for the Soviet Union national football team
178. Capped for the Sweden national under-21 football team
179. Capped for the Sweden men's national under-19 football team
180. Capped for the Sweden men's national under-17 football team
181. Capped for the Switzerland national football team
182. Capped for the Switzerland national under-21 football team
183. Capped for the Switzerland national under-20 football team
184. Capped for the Switzerland national under-19 football team
185. Capped for the Switzerland national under-18 football team
186. Capped for the Switzerland national under-17 football team
187. Capped for the Switzerland national under-16 football team
188. Capped for the Switzerland national under-15 football team
189. Capped for the Tajikistan national football team
190. Capped for the Turkey national under-21 football team
191. Capped for the Turkey national under-20 football team
192. Capped for the Turkey national under-19 football team
193. Capped for the Turkey national under-18 football team
194. Capped for the Turkey national under-17 football team
195. Capped for the Turkey national under-16 football team
196. Capped for the Turkey national under-15 football team
197. Capped for the Ukraine national football team
198. Capped for the United States national under-20 football team
199. Capped for the United States national under-17 football team
200. Capped for the Yugoslavia national football team
201. Capped for the Yugoslavia national under-21 football team
