= 2023–24 Hatayspor season =

Hatayspor
2023–24 season
- President: Nihat Tazeaslan
- Head coach: Volkan Demirel (until 3 May); Özhan Pulat (from 3 May)
- Stadium: Mersin Stadium (temporary)
- Süper Lig: 15th
- Turkish Cup: Round of 16
- Top goalscorer: League: Carlos Strandberg; Fisayo Dele-Bashiru; 8 goals each All: Carlos Strandberg (13)
- Average home league attendance: 5,821

The 2023–24 season is Hatayspor's 57th season in existence and fourth consecutive in the Süper Lig. They also competed in the Turkish Cup. This season, the team temporarily moved its home matches to Mersin Stadium.

== Players ==
=== Squad ===
As of 9 February 2024

Note: Flags indicate national team as defined under FIFA eligibility rules; some limited exceptions apply. Players may hold more than one non-FIFA nationality.

No.	Pos.	Nation	Player
1	GK	TUR	Erce Kardeşler (vice-captain)
2	DF	TUR	Kamil Çörekçi (captain)
3	DF	CMR	Guy Kilama
4	MF	CGO	Chandrel Massanga
5	MF	GER	Görkem Sağlam
6	MF	TUR	Abdülkadir Parmak
7	MF	TUR	Ömer Faruk Beyaz (on loan from VfB Stuttgart)
8	MF	FRA	Mehdi Boudjemaa
9	FW	AZE	Renat Dadaşov (on loan from Grasshoppers)
10	FW	SWE	Carlos Strandberg
11	FW	TUR	Halil Dervişoğlu (on loan from Galatasaray)
12	GK	KOS	Visar Bekaj
13	DF	ALG	Faouzi Ghoulam
14	FW	POR	Rui Pedro
15	DF	TUR	Recep Burak Yılmaz
17	MF	NGR	Fisayo Dele-Bashiru

No.	Pos.	Nation	Player
18	MF	BIH	Armin Hodžić
19	DF	SRB	Nikola Maksimović
20	MF	FRA	Rayane Aabid
22	DF	TUR	Kerim Alıcı
25	MF	TUR	Ali Yıldız
27	DF	TUR	Cengiz Demir
29	MF	GEO	Giorgi Aburjania
31	DF	GER	Oğuzhan Matur
34	GK	TUR	Demir Sarıcalı
57	DF	TUR	Engin Can Aksoy
70	FW	TUR	Doğukan Sinik (on loan from Hull City)
77	MF	POR	Joelson Fernandes
78	GK	TUR	Emir Dadük
88	MF	TUR	Cemali Sertel (on loan from İstanbul Başakşehir)
99	FW	HON	Rigoberto Rivas
—	DF	TUR	Nazım Özcan

=== Out on loan ===
Note: Flags indicate national team as defined under FIFA eligibility rules; some limited exceptions apply. Players may hold more than one non-FIFA nationality.

No.	Pos.	Nation	Player
—	GK	TUR	Yavuz Buğra Boyar (at Yeni Mersin İdmanyurdu until 30 June 2024)
—	GK	TUR	Arel Ekinci (at Nevşehir Belediyespor until 30 June 2024)
—	GK	TUR	Abdullah Yiğiter (at Kastamonuspor 1966 until 30 June 2024)
—	MF	TUR	Sarper Çağlar (at Silifke Belediyespor until 30 June 2024)
—	MF	TUR	Baran Sarka (at Yeni Mersin İdmanyurdu until 30 June 2024)
—	MF	TUR	Selimcan Temel (at Kırşehir Futbol SK until 30 June 2024)

No.	Pos.	Nation	Player
—	FW	CMR	Didier Lamkel Zé (at Metz until 30 June 2024)
—	FW	TUR	Onur Arı (at Yeni Mersin İdmanyurdu until 30 June 2024)
—	FW	TUR	İbrahim Demir (at Yeni Mersin İdmanyurdu until 30 June 2024)
—	FW	TUR	Ünal Durmuşhan (at Derince Belediyespor until 30 June 2024)
—	FW	TUR	Berke Önde (at Balıkesirspor until 30 June 2024)
—	FW	TUR	Koray Yağcı (at Diyarbekirspor until 30 June 2024)

=== Out on loan ===
Note: Flags indicate national team as defined under FIFA eligibility rules; some limited exceptions apply. Players may hold more than one non-FIFA nationality.

No.	Pos.	Nation	Player
—	MF	TUR	Sarper Çağlar (at Zonguldak Kömürspor until 30 June 2024)
—	FW	TUR	Koray Yağcı (at Tuzlaspor until 30 June 2024)
—	GK	TUR	Arel Ekinci (at Nevşehir Belediyespor until 30 June 2024)
—	GK	TUR	Abdullah Yiğiter (at Kastamonuspor until 30 June 2024)

== Transfers ==
=== In ===
Pos.	Player	Transferred from	Fee	Date	Source
FW	(Turkey) Onur Arı	(Turkey) Eskişehirspor	€115,000	1 July 2023	
FW	(Sweden) Carlos Strandberg	(Qatar) Al-Sailiya	Undisclosed	5 July 2023	
FW	(Nigeria) Fisayo Dele-Bashiru	(England) Sheffield Wednesday	Undisclosed	6 July 2023	
MF	(Turkey) Ömer Faruk Beyaz	(Germany) VfB Stuttgart	Loan	1 August 2023	
FW	(Cameroon) Didier Lamkel Zé	(Belgium) Kortrijk	Loan	7 August 2023	
DF	(Algeria) Faouzi Ghoulam	Unattached	Free	28 August 2023	
MF	(Republic of the Congo) Massanga Matondo	(Albania) Partizani	€600,000	29 August 2023	
MF	(Turkey) Doğukan Sinik	(England) Hull City	Loan	1 February 2024	
FW	(Turkey) Halil Dervişoğlu	(Turkey) Galatasaray	Loan	9 February 2024	
MF	(Portugal) Rui Pedro	(Slovenia) NK Olimpija	Undisclosed	9 February 2024	

=== Out ===
Pos.	Player	Transferred to	Fee	Date	Source
MF	(Georgia (country)) Saba Lobzhanidze	(United States) Atlanta United	€1,500,000	2 August 2023	
FW	(Turkey) Bertuğ Yıldırım	(France) Rennes	€5,000,000	29 August 2023	
DF	(Bosnia and Herzegovina) Ognjen Vranješ	(Serbia) Čukarički	Undisclosed	1 September 2023	
DF	(Turkey) Musa Çağıran	(Turkey) Gençlerbirliği	Undisclosed	15 September 2023	
FW	(Cameroon) Didier Lamkel Zé	(France) Metz	Loan	1 February 2024	

== Pre-season and friendlies ==
Win Draw Loss Fixtures

9 July 2023 Friendly	Hatayspor (Turkey)	1–1	(England) Hull City	Bursa
19:30 UTC+3				Stadium: Bursa Büyükşehir Belediye Stadyumu

16 July 2023 Friendly	Hatayspor (Turkey)	1–2	(Turkey) Bodrumspor	Kaynaşlı
17:00 UTC+3	Demir 12'		Čelůstka 33'; Tarım 77'	Stadium: Fenerbahce SK Topuk Yaylasi Tesisleri

29 July 2023 Friendly	Napoli (Italy)	4–0	(Turkey) Hatayspor	Castel di Sangro
18:30 UTC+2	Osimhen 23', 28'; Simeone 64', 70'	Report		Stadium: Stadio Teofilo Patini; Referee: Matteo Marchetti (Italy)

1 August 2023 Friendly	Salernitana (Italy)	Cancelled	(Turkey) Hatayspor	Latina, Italy
19:00 UTC+3				Stadium: Stadio Domenico Francioni
Note: The match was cancelled.

5 August 2023 Friendly	Hatayspor (Turkey)	2–1	(Turkey) Antalyaspor	Istanbul
19:00 UTC+3	Yıldırım 33'; Fernandes 78'		Buksa 18'	Stadium: Atatürk Olympic Stadium

== Competitions ==
=== Overall record ===
Competition	First match	Last match	Starting round	Final position	Record							
Competition	First match	Last match	Starting round	Final position	Pld	W	D	L	GF	GA	GD	Win %
Süper Lig	12 August 2023	19 May 2024	Matchday 1	15th	38	9	14	15	45	52	−7	23.68
Turkish Cup	31 October 2023	7 February 2024	Third round	Round of 16	4	3	1	0	10	3	+7	75.00
Total					42	12	15	15	55	55	+0	28.57

Last updated: 26 May 2024
Source: Soccerway

=== Süper Lig ===
==== League table ====
Pos	Team	Pld	W	D	L	GF	GA	GD	Pts	Qualification or relegation
13	Samsunspor	38	11	10	17	42	52	−10	43	
14	Kayserispor (Note: 3 points deducted)	38	11	12	15	44	57	−13	42	
15	Hatayspor	38	9	14	15	45	52	−7	41 (Note: Hatayspor are ahead of Konyaspor on overall goal difference.)	
16	Konyaspor	38	9	14	15	40	53	−13	41	
17	Ankaragücü (R)	38	8	16	14	46	52	−6	40 (Note: Ankaragücü are ahead of Fatih Karagümrük on head-to-head points: Fatih Karagümrük 1–1 Ankaragücü, Ankaragücü 2–0 Fatih Karagümrük.)	Relegation to TFF First League

Source: Süper Lig
Rules for classification: 1) Points; 2) Head-to-head points; 3) Head-to-head goal difference; 4) Head-to-head goals scored; 5) Goal difference; 6) Goals scored; 7) Play-off.
(R) Relegated

==== Results summary ====
Overall								Home						Away					
Pld	W	D	L	GF	GA	GD	Pts	W	D	L	GF	GA	GD	W	D	L	GF	GA	GD
38	9	14	15	45	52	−7	41	7	7	5	30	26	+4	2	7	10	15	26	−11

Last updated: 26 May 2024.
Source: Trendyol Süper Lig

==== Results by round ====
Round	1	2	3	4	5	6	7	8	9	10	11	12	13	14	15	16	17	18	19	20	21	22	23	24	25	26	27	28	29	30	31	32	33	34	35	36	37	38
Ground	A	H	A	H	A	H	A	H	A	H	A	H	A	H	A	H	A	H	A	H	A	H	A	H	A	H	A	H	A	H	A	H	A	H	A	H	A	H
Result	W	D	D	D	D	W	D	W	L	L	L	W	L	D	L	D	D	L	L	D	L	D	W	W	L	D	L	L	D	W	L	L	L	L	D	W	D	W
Position	1	2	4	7	8	5	7	5	7	8	9	9	10	10	10	11	12	15	16	14	17	16	15	12	14	14	15	16	17	15	15	16	17	18	18	17	17	15

Updated to match(es) played on 26 May 2024. Source: Trendyol Süper Lig
A = Away; H = Home; W = Win; D = Draw; L = Loss

==== Matches ====
The league fixtures were unveiled on 19 July 2023.

12 August 2023 1	Pendikspor	1–5	Hatayspor	Istanbul
21:45 TRT (UTC+3)	Thuram 90+3'	Report	Strandberg 3'; Sağlam (yellow card) 19', (goal) 23'; Yıldırım 46'; Dele-Bashiru 57', 85'	Stadium: Ümraniye Municipality City Stadium; Referee: Çağdaş Altay

19 August 2023 2	Hatayspor	0–0	Kasımpaşa	Mersin
21:45 TRT (UTC+3)		Report		Stadium: Mersin Stadium; Referee: Mert Güzenge

27 August 2023 3	Alanyaspor	0–0	Hatayspor	Alanya
21:45 TRT (UTC+3)	Özdemir (yellow card) 74'; Balkovec (yellow card) 90+6'; Karaca (yellow card) 90+6'; Bayır (yellow card) 90+7'	Report	Yıldırım (yellow card) 37'; Aburjania (yellow card) 76'; Joelson (yellow card) 90+7'	Stadium: Alanya Stadium; Referee: Direnç Tonusluoğlu

3 September 2023 4	Hatayspor	3–3	Adana Demirspor	Mersin
21:45 TRT (UTC+3)	Aksoy (yellow card) 26'; Strandberg 53', 73' (pen.), (yellow card) 79'; Beyaz (yellow card) 58'; Dele-Bashiru 75', (yellow card) 76'; Bekaroğlu (yellow card) 81'; Alıcı (yellow card) 90+7'	Report	C. Ndiaye 40', (yellow card) 81'; Gravillon 84'; Güler (yellow card) 88'; Nani 89'	Stadium: Mersin Stadium; Referee: Sarper Barış Saka

18 September 2023 5	Fatih Karagümrük	0–0	Hatayspor	Istanbul
20:00 TRT (UTC+3)	Sturaro (yellow card) 59'; Mendes (yellow card) 62'; Yalçın (yellow card) 90+9'	Report	Lamkel Zé (yellow card) 45' (penalty missed) 73'; Kardeşler (yellow card) 90+9'	Stadium: Atatürk Olympic Stadium; Referee: Yaşar Kemal Uğurlu

25 September 2023 6	Hatayspor	3–2	Trabzonspor	Mersin
20:05 TRT (UTC+3)	Lamkel Zé (yellow card) 39' (goal) 88'; Rivas 72' (yellow card) 90+2'; Joelson (yellow card) 83'; Dadashov (yellow card) 90'; Matur (yellow card) 90+5'; Dele-Bashiru 90+6' (yellow card) 90+6'	Report	Mendy (yellow card) 30'; Višća 44'; Bakasetas (yellow card) 49'; Onuachu 62'	Stadium: Mersin Stadium; Referee: Burak Şeker

30 September 2023 7	Sivasspor	0–0	Hatayspor	Sivas
13:30 TRT (UTC+3)	Vural (yellow card) 51'; Koita (yellow card) 85'; N'Jie (yellow card) 90+3'	Report	Massanga (yellow card) 43'; Beyaz (yellow card) 72'; Matur (yellow card) 80'	Stadium: New Sivas 4 Eylül Stadium; Referee: Murat Erdoğan

8 October 2023 8	Hatayspor	3–1	Konyaspor	Mersin
19:00 TRT (UTC+3)	Dadashov 22', 53' (yellow card) 31'; Hodžić (yellow card) 80'; Strandberg 83'	Report	Prip 32'	Stadium: Mersin Stadium; Referee: Ümit Öztürk

22 October 2023 9	Fenerbahçe	4–2	Hatayspor	Istanbul
19:00 TRT (UTC+3)	Szymański 7'; Osayi-Samuel 15'; Džeko 39'; Kahveci 63'; Becão (yellow card) 73'	Report	Dele-Bashiru (yellow card) 20'; Ghoulam 55'; Kilama (yellow card) 61'; Bekaroğlu (yellow card) 69'; Lamkel Zé (yellow card) 73'; Aabid 90+4'	Stadium: Şükrü Saracoğlu Stadium; Attendance: 41,976; Referee: Volkan Bayarslan

27 October 2023 10	Hatayspor	1–2	Kayserispor	Mersin
20:00 TRT (UTC+3)	Bekaroğlu (yellow card) 12'; Dele-Bashiru (yellow card) 24'; Dadashov 68' (yellow card) 86'; Bekaj (yellow card) 86'; Aabid (yellow card) 90+6'	Report	Bekaroğlu 33' (o.g.); Boa Morte 47'	Stadium: Mersin Stadium; Referee: Sarper Barış Saka

4 November 2023 11	Samsunspor	2–1	Hatayspor	Samsun
16:00 TRT (UTC+3)	Tırpan (yellow card) 45+4'; Kara 77'; Bennasser (yellow card) 77'; Schindler 90+9' (yellow card) 90+10'	Report	Lamkel Zé 36'; Massanga (yellow card) 45+1'; Sağlam (yellow card) 45+3'; Alıcı (yellow card) 62'; Ghoulam (yellow card) 73'; Joelson (yellow card) 76' (yellow-red card) 90+11'; Kardeşler (yellow card) 78'	Stadium: Samsun 19 Mayıs Stadium; Referee: Halil Umut Meler

11 November 2023 12	Hatayspor	2–1	Galatasaray	Mersin
19:00 TRT (UTC+3)	Rivas 14'; Zé 55'; Aburjania (yellow card) 89'; Hodzic (yellow card) 90+6'	Report	Zaha 28'; Sánchez (yellow card) 35'	Stadium: Mersin Stadium; Attendance: 20,573; Referee: Bahattin Şimşek

25 November 2023 13	İstanbulspor	2–1	Hatayspor	Istanbul
13:30 TRT (UTC+3)	Loshaj 26' (yellow card) 77'; Deli (yellow card) 46'; Mamadou 78'	Report	Ghoulam (yellow card) 21'; Dadashov 48' (pen.) (yellow card) 90+7'; Kilama (yellow card) 77'	Stadium: Esenyurt Necmi Kadıoğlu Stadium; Referee: Tugay Kaan Numanoğlu

1 December 2023 14	Hatayspor	3–3	Antalyaspor	Mersin
20:00 TRT (UTC+3)	Strandberg 19'; Massanga (yellow card) 39'; Alıcı 62'; Demir (yellow card) 67'; Kilama 71'	Report	Yeşilyurt 35'; Buksa 57', 88'; Sarı (yellow card) 69'; Safouri (yellow card) 90+13'	Stadium: Mersin Stadium; Referee: Yiğit Arslan

10 December 2023 15	İstanbul Başakşehir	1–0	Hatayspor	Istanbul
16:00 TRT (UTC+3)	Abeid 12'; Opoku (yellow card) 20' (yellow-red card) 90+6'; Babacan (yellow card) 81'	Report	Strandberg (yellow card) 64'; Rivas (yellow card) 86'; Kardeşler (yellow card) 90+5'; Dadashov (penalty missed) 90+9'	Stadium: Başakşehir Fatih Terim Stadium; Referee: Burak Şeker

21 December 2024 17	MKE Ankaragücü	0–0	Hatayspor	Ankara
20:00 TRT (UTC+3)		Report	Sağlam (yellow card) 45+1'; Rivas (yellow card) 71'	Stadium: Eryaman Stadium; Referee: Abdulkadir Bitigen

25 December 2023 18	Hatayspor	1–2	Beşiktaş	Mersin
20:00 TRT (UTC+3)	Rivas (yellow card) 51'; Hodžić 80'	Report	Kılıçsoy 38'; Colley 53'; Amartey (yellow card) 57'	Stadium: Mersin Stadium; Referee: Kadir Sağlam

6 January 2024 19	Çaykur Rizespor	2–0	Hatayspor	Rize
13:30 TRT (UTC+3)	Varešanović 19'; Olawoyin 82'	Report	Ghoulam (yellow card) 56'; Hodžić (yellow card) 64'	Stadium: Rize City Stadium; Referee: Cihan Aydın

10 January 2024 16	Hatayspor	0–0	Gaziantep	Mersin
17:00 TRT (UTC+3)	Beyaz (yellow card) 51'; Kilama (yellow card) 63'; Dadashov (yellow card) 75'	Report		Stadium: Mersin Stadium; Referee: Ümit Öztürk

13 January 2024 20	Hatayspor	1–1	Pendikspor	Mersin
13:30 TRT (UTC+3)	Ghoulam (yellow card) 20'; Rivas 47'; Dele-Bashiru (yellow card) 80'; Kardeşler (yellow card) 86'; Maksimović (yellow card) 88'	Report	Öztürk (yellow card) 72'; Kappel 90+4'	Stadium: Mersin Stadium; Referee: Muhammet Ali Metoğlu

20 January 2024 21	Kasımpaşa	3–0	Hatayspor	Istanbul
13:30 TRT (UTC+3)	Winck 74' (yellow card) 82' da Costa 79'; Fall 89'	Report	Aburjania (yellow card) 18'; Çörekçi (yellow card) 75'	Stadium: Recep Tayyip Erdoğan Stadium; Referee: Abdullah Buğra Taşkınsoy

23 January 2024 22	Hatayspor	1–1	Alanyaspor	Mersin
21:45 TRT (UTC+3)	Rivas 5'; Joelson (yellow card) 68'; Dadashov (yellow card) 69'; Yılmaz (yellow card) 87'; Boudjemaa (yellow card) 88'	Report	Aydın (yellow card) 66' (goal) 89' (pen.); Fer (yellow card) 88'	Stadium: Mersin Stadium; Referee: Emre Kargın

27 January 2024 23	Adana Demirspor	0–1	Hatayspor	Adana
19:00 TRT (UTC+3)	Erdoğan (yellow card) 44'; Güler (yellow card) 48' (yellow-red card) 90+6'; David (yellow card) 57'; Gravillon (yellow card) 85'	Report	Nani 44' (o.g.); Dadashov (yellow card) 48'; Dele-Bashiru (yellow card) 58'; Bekaj (yellow card) 77'; Yılmaz (yellow card) 90+4'	Stadium: New Adana Stadium; Referee: Mert Güzenge

2 February 2024 24	Hatayspor	3–1	Fatih Karagümrük	Mersin
17:00 TRT (UTC+3)	Massanga 41', 90'; Strandberg 51' (pen.)	Report	Ceccherini (yellow card) 49'; Lasagna 86'; Keleş (yellow card) 83'	Stadium: Mersin Stadium; Referee: Ömer Faruk Turtay

12 February 2024 25	Trabzonspor	2–0	Hatayspor	Trabzon
17:00 TRT (UTC+3)	Trézéguet (yellow card) 5' (goal) 49'; Bardhi 77' (yellow card) 77'	Report	Sağlam (yellow card) 15'	Stadium: Papara Park; Referee: Ali Şansalan

17 February 2024 26	Hatayspor	1–1	Sivasspor	Mersin
16:00 TRT (UTC+3)	Pedro (yellow card) 68'; Boudjemaa 75'	Report	Manaj 18'; Çiftçi (yellow card) 74'	Stadium: Mersin Stadium; Referee: Ümit Öztürk

24 February 2024 27	Konyaspor	2–0	Hatayspor	Konya
19:00 TRT (UTC+3)	Damjanović (yellow card) 40'; Oğuz (yellow card) 45'; Yazğılı 52'; Ülgün 56' (yellow card) 69'; Słowik (yellow card) 77'; Sambou (yellow card) 90+7'; Ethemi (yellow card) 90+8'	Report	Kilama (yellow card) 27'; Pedro (yellow card) 90+8'; Kardeşler (yellow card) 90+9'	Stadium: Konya Metropolitan Municipality Stadium; Referee: Ali Şansalan

2 March 2024 28	Hatayspor	0–2	Fenerbahçe	Mersin
19:00 TRT (UTC+3)	Massanga (yellow card) 44'	Report	Osayi-Samuel (yellow card) 8', (goal) 24'; Becão (yellow card) 34'; Ünder 40'; Oosterwolde (yellow card) 78'; Yüksek (yellow card) 90+2'; Söyüncü (yellow card) 90+4'	Stadium: Mersin Stadium; Attendance: 18,547; Referee: Atilla Karaoğlan

10 March 2024 29	Kayserispor	1–1	Hatayspor	Kayseri
13:30 TRT (UTC+3)	Bourabia 23'; Cardoso (yellow card) 71'; Civelek (yellow card) 75'; Kocaman (red card) 76'; Sazdağı (yellow card) 79'	Report	Sinik 2' (yellow card) 17'; Yılmaz (yellow card) 69'; Boudjemaa (yellow card) 82'	Stadium: Kadir Has Stadium; Referee: Halil Umut Meler

17 March 2024 30	Hatayspor	3–0	Samsunspor	Mersin
19:00 TRT (UTC+3)	Strandberg 3'; Alıcı (yellow card) 34'; Ghoulam (yellow card) 60'; Kardeşler (yellow card) 69'; Maksimović (yellow card) 80'; Dele-Bashiru 89'; Rivas 90+2'	Report	Kılınç (yellow card) 41'	Stadium: Mersin Stadium; Referee: Burak Şeker

2 April 2024 31	Galatasaray	1–0	Hatayspor	Istanbul
20:30 TRT (UTC+3)	Icardi 13'; Nelsson (yellow card) 82'; Vinícius (yellow card) 90+1'	Report	Rivas (yellow card) 45+2'; Beyaz (yellow card) 45+3'	Stadium: Rams Park; Attendance: 41,220; Referee: Ali Şansalan

14 April 2024 32	Hatayspor	0–3	İstanbulspor	Mersin
16:00 TRT (UTC+3)	Boudjemaa (yellow card) 48'; Sinik (yellow card) 86'	Report	Loshaj 68'; Mamadou 71'; Temel 87'	Stadium: Mersin Stadium; Referee: Mert Güzenge

21 April 2024 33	Antalyaspor	2–1	Hatayspor	Antalya
19:00 TRT (UTC+3)	van de Streek (yellow card) 59'; Yeşilyurt (yellow card) 60'; Buksa 67'; Sarı (yellow card) 87'; Bytyqi 90+2'; Uzun (yellow card) 90+4'	Report	Ghoulam (yellow card) 8'; Beyaz (yellow card) 15'; Dele-Bashiru 27'; Kardeşler (yellow card) 65'	Stadium: Corendon Airlines Park; Referee: Abdulkadir Bitigen

27 April 2024 34	Hatayspor	1–2	İstanbul Başakşehir	Mersin
19:00 TRT (UTC+3)	Rivas (yellow card) 61'; Dadashov 73'	Report	Piątek 5'; İlkhan (yellow card) 23'; Souza (yellow card) 24'; Duarte (yellow card) 63'; Kemen 69'	Stadium: Mersin Stadium; Referee: Atilla Karaoğlan

5 May 2024 35	Gaziantep	1–1	Hatayspor	Gaziantep
19:00 TRT (UTC+3)	Djilobodji 11' (yellow card) 56'; Kızıldağ (yellow card) 62'	Report	Kilama 15'; Yılmaz (yellow card) 23'; Ghoulam (yellow card) 32'; Çörekçi (yellow card) 52'; Sinik (yellow card) 68'; Beyaz (yellow card) 79'	Stadium: Gaziantep Stadium; Referee: Halil Umut Meler

12 May 2024 36	Hatayspor	2–1	MKE Ankaragücü	Mersin
19:00 TRT (UTC+3)	Sinik (yellow card) 5'; Çörekçi (yellow card) 53'; Sağlam 71'; Ghoulam (yellow card) 74'; Kardeşler (yellow card) 81'; Dadashov 90'; Demir (yellow card) 90+1'; Pedro (yellow card) 90+7'	Report	Çankaya (yellow card) 35'; Macheda 85' (yellow card) 90+1'	Stadium: Mersin Stadium; Referee: Ali Şansalan

18 May 2024 37	Beşiktaş	2–2	Hatayspor	Istanbul
19:00 TRT (UTC+3)	Fernandes 50' (yellow card) 90+8'; Aboubakar (yellow card) 74' (goal) 90+7' (pen.); Masuaku (yellow card) 74'; Muçi (yellow card) 75'; Uçan (yellow card) 90+3'; Sanuç (yellow card) 90+8'	Report	Massanga 26'; Pedro (yellow card) 44'; Joelson (yellow card) 45+2'; Dele-Bashiru 55'; Sertel (yellow card) 90+10'	Stadium: Beşiktaş Stadium; Referee: Cihan Aydın

26 May 2024 38	Hatayspor	2–0	Çaykur Rizespor	Mersin
19:30 TRT (UTC+3)	Dele-Bashiru 3'; Strandberg 57'	Report		Stadium: Mersin Stadium; Referee: Abdulkadir Bitigen

=== Turkish Cup ===
31 October 2023 Third Round	Hatayspor	2–0	Sarıyer	Istanbul
17:30 TRT (UTC+3)	Strandberg 48'; Hodzic (yellow card) 57'; Massanga 90+1'	Report	C.Doğan (yellow card) 51'; B.Doğan (yellow card) 55'	Stadium: Atatürk Olympic Stadium; Referee: Davut Dakul Çelik

6 December 2023 Fourth Round	Hatayspor	2–1	Düzcespor	Mersin
17:00 TRT (UTC+3)	Yılmaz (yellow card) 18'; Hodzic 22', 58'; Bekaroğlu (yellow card) 27'	Report	Zorlu 28' (pen.); Ayyildiz (yellow card) 39'} Başkaya (yellow card) 49'} Kulya (yellow card) 73'}	Stadium: Mersin Stadium; Referee: Davut Dakul Çelik

16 January 2024 Fifth round	Hatayspor	5–1	Sakaryaspor	Mersin
17:00 TRT (UTC+3)	Strandberg 4', 23', 31', 90'; Dele-Bashiru 41'; Beyaz (yellow card) 75'	Report	Dimitrov 19'; Şanlı (yellow card) 37'; Yıldırım (yellow card) 45+1'; Dikmen (yellow card) 54'	Stadium: Mersin Stadium; Referee: Ali Yılmaz

7 February 2024 Round of 16	İstanbul Başakşehir	1–1 (a.e.t.) (3–2 p)	Hatayspor	Istanbul
17:30 TRT (UTC+3)	Kény 23'; Tekdemir (yellow card) 39'; Opoku (yellow card) 71'; Lima (yellow card) 120+3'	Report	Yılmaz (yellow card) 35'; Massanga 58'; Sağlam (yellow card) 68'; Sinik (yellow card) 116'	Stadium: Başakşehir Fatih Terim Stadium; Referee: Bahattin Şimşek
	Penalties
	Szysz (penalty missed); Ba (penalty scored); Türüç (penalty missed); Özcan (penalty scored); Opoku (penalty scored)		(penalty missed) Rivas; (penalty missed) Sağlam; (penalty scored) Massanga; (penalty scored) Sinik; (penalty missed) Strandberg

== Squad statistics ==
As of match played 26 May 2024

=== Appearances and goals ===
Players with no appearances are not included on the list
Italics indicate a loaned in player

No.	Pos	Nat	Player	Total		Süper Lig		Turkish Cup	
No.	Pos	Nat	Player	Apps	Goals	Apps	Goals	Apps	Goals
1	GK	(Turkey) TUR	Erce Kardeşler	35	0	35	0	0	0
2	DF	(Turkey) TUR	Kamil Çörekçi	25	0	19+5	0	0+1	0
3	DF	(Cameroon) CMR	Guy Kilama	37	2	35	2	1+1	0
4	MF	(Republic of the Congo) CGO	Chandrel Massanga	33	5	27+3	3	2+1	2
5	MF	(Germany) GER	Görkem Sağlam	34	2	17+14	2	2+1	0
6	MF	(Turkey) TUR	Musa Çağıran	2	0	0+2	0	0	0
6	MF	(Turkey) TUR	Abdulkadir Parmak	5	0	2+3	0	0	0
7	MF	(Turkey) TUR	Ömer Faruk Beyaz	30	0	17+10	0	1+2	0
8	MF	(France) FRA	Mehdi Boudjemaa	18	1	7+9	1	1+1	0
9	FW	(Azerbaijan) AZE	Renat Dadashov	33	6	13+18	6	1+1	0
10	FW	(Sweden) SWE	Carlos Strandberg	40	13	27+9	8	3+1	5
12	GK	(Kosovo) KOS	Visar Bekaj	8	0	3+1	0	4	0
13	DF	(Algeria) ALG	Faouzi Ghoulam	24	1	18+3	1	2+1	0
14	FW	(Portugal) POR	Rui Pedro	11	0	5+6	0	0	0
15	DF	(Turkey) TUR	Recep Burak Yılmaz	14	0	10+1	0	3	0
17	MF	(Nigeria) NGR	Fisayo Dele-Bashiru	39	9	34+2	8	2+1	1
18	MF	(Bosnia and Herzegovina) BIH	Armin Hodžić	25	3	4+17	1	3+1	2
19	DF	(Serbia) SRB	Nikola Maksimović	20	0	15+3	0	2	0
20	MF	(France) FRA	Rayane Aabid	14	1	1+10	1	3	0
22	DF	(Turkey) TUR	Kerim Alıcı	28	1	16+8	1	3+1	0
26	FW	(Turkey) TUR	Onur Arı	3	0	0+3	0	0	0
27	DF	(Turkey) TUR	Cengiz Demir	8	0	6+1	0	1	0
28	MF	(Turkey) TUR	İbrahim Demir	2	0	0	0	0+2	0
29	MF	(Georgia (country)) GEO	Giorgi Aburjania	21	0	15+5	0	1	0
31	DF	(Germany) GER	Oğuzhan Matur	9	0	3+5	0	0+1	0
57	DF	(Turkey) TUR	Engin Can Aksoy	6	0	5	0	1	0
70	MF	(Turkey) TUR	Doğukan Sinik	10	1	4+5	1	0+1	0
77	MF	(Portugal) POR	Joelson Fernandes	35	0	14+17	0	3+1	0
86	DF	(Turkey) TUR	Burak Bekaroğlu	17	0	12+3	0	2	0
88	DF	(Turkey) TUR	Cemali Sertel	14	0	8+5	0	1	0
99	FW	(Honduras) HON	Rigoberto Rivas	32	5	27+2	5	2+1	0
Players away from the club on loan:
11	FW	(Cameroon) CMR	Didier Lamkel Zé	16	3	9+6	3	0+1	0
Players who featured but departed the club permanently during the season:
11	FW	(Turkey) TUR	Halil Dervişoğlu	11	0	7+4	0	0	0
99	FW	(Turkey) TUR	Bertuğ Yıldırım	3	1	3	1	0	0

=== Goal scorers ===
Place	Position	Nation	Number	Name	Süper Lig	Turkish Cup	Total
1	FW	(Sweden)	10	Carlos Strandberg	8	5	13
2	MF	(Nigeria)	17	Fisayo Dele-Bashiru	8	1	9
3	FW	(Azerbaijan)	9	Renat Dadashov	6	0	6
4	FW	(Honduras)	99	Rigoberto Rivas	5	0	5
4	MF	(Republic of the Congo)	4	Chandrel Massanga	3	2	5
6	FW	(Cameroon)	11	Didier Lamkel Zé	3	0	3
6	MF	(Bosnia and Herzegovina)	18	Armin Hodžić	1	2	3
8	DF	(Cameroon)	3	Guy Kilama	2	0	2
8	DF	(Germany)	5	Görkem Sağlam	2	0	2
10	DF	(Algeria)	13	Faouzi Ghoulam	1	0	1
10	DF	(Turkey)	22	Kerim Alıcı	1	0	1
10	MF	(France)	8	Mehdi Boudjemaa	1	0	1
10	MF	(France)	20	Rayane Aabid	1	0	1
10	MF	(Turkey)	70	Doğukan Sinik	1	0	1
10	FW	(Turkey)	99	Bertuğ Yıldırım	1	0	1
10				Own goal	1	0	1
Total					45	8	53

=== Clean sheets ===
Place	Position	Nation	Number	Name	Süper Lig	Turkish Cup	Total
1	GK	(Turkey)	1	Erce Kardeşler	9	0	9
2	GK	(Kosovo)	12	Visar Bekaj	1	1	2
Total					10	1	11

=== Disciplinary record ===
Number	Nation	Position	Name	Süper Lig		Turkish Cup		Total	
Number	Nation	Position	Name	Yellow card	Red card	Yellow card	Red card	Yellow card	Red card
1	(Turkey)	GK	Erce Kardeşler	8	0	0	0	8	0
2	(Turkey)	DF	Kamil Çörekçi	3	0	0	0	3	0
3	(Cameroon)	DF	Guy Kilama	4	0	0	0	4	0
4	(Republic of the Congo)	MF	Chandrel Massanga	4	0	0	0	4	0
5	(Germany)	MF	Görkem Sağlam	4	0	1	0	5	0
7	(Turkey)	MF	Ömer Faruk Beyaz	6	0	1	0	7	0
8	(France)	MF	Mehdi Boudjemaa	3	0	0	0	3	0
9	(Azerbaijan)	FW	Renat Dadashov	7	0	0	0	7	0
10	(Sweden)	FW	Carlos Strandberg	2	0	0	0	2	0
12	(Kosovo)	GK	Visar Bekaj	2	0	0	0	2	0
13	(Algeria)	DF	Faouzi Ghoulam	8	0	0	0	8	0
14	(Portugal)	FW	Rui Pedro	4	0	0	0	4	0
15	(Turkey)	DF	Recep Burak Yılmaz	4	0	2	0	6	0
17	(Nigeria)	MF	Fisayo Dele-Bashiru	6	0	0	0	6	0
18	(Bosnia and Herzegovina)	MF	Armin Hodžić	3	0	1	0	4	0
19	(Serbia)	DF	Nikola Maksimović	2	0	0	0	2	0
20	(France)	MF	Rayane Aabid	1	0	0	0	1	0
22	(Turkey)	DF	Kerim Alıcı	3	0	0	0	3	0
27	(Turkey)	DF	Cengiz Demir	2	0	0	0	2	0
29	(Georgia (country))	MF	Giorgi Aburjania	3	0	0	0	3	0
31	(Germany)	DF	Oğuzhan Matur	2	0	0	0	2	0
57	(Turkey)	DF	Engin Can Aksoy	1	0	0	0	1	0
70	(Turkey)	FW	Doğukan Sinik	4	0	1	0	5	0
77	(Portugal)	MF	Joelson Fernandes	6	1	0	0	6	1
86	(Turkey)	DF	Burak Bekaroğlu	3	0	1	0	4	0
88	(Turkey)	DF	Cemali Sertel	1	0	0	0	1	0
99	(Honduras)	FW	Rigoberto Rivas	6	0	0	0	6	0
Players away on loan:
11	(Cameroon)	FW	Didier Lamkel Zé	3	0	0	0	3	0
Players who left Hatayspor during the season:
99	(Turkey)	FW	Bertuğ Yıldırım	1	0	0	0	1	0
Total				106	1	7	0	113	1
