= List of Turkish football transfers summer 2023 =

This is a list of Turkish football transfers in the 2023 summer transfer window by club. Only clubs in the 2023–24 Süper Lig are included.

== Transfers ==
Date	Name	Moving from	Moving to	Fee
8 March 2023	(Netherlands) Patrick van Aanholt	Galatasaray	(Netherlands) PSV	Loan
17 April 2023	(Democratic Republic of the Congo) Arthur Masuaku	(England) West Ham United	Beşiktaş	Undisclosed
11 June 2023	(England) Ryan Kent	(Scotland) Rangers	Fenerbahçe	Free
13 June 2023	(Nigeria) Henry Onyekuru	(Greece) Olympiacos	Adana Demirspor	€3.5m
14 June 2023	(Portugal) Bruma	Fenerbahçe	(Portugal) Braga	Undisclosed
14 June 2023	(Egypt) Mostafa Mohamed	Galatasaray	(France) Nantes	Undisclosed
19 June 2023	(Turkey) Okan Kocuk	Galatasaray	Samsunspor	Free
23 June 2023	(Azerbaijan) Mert Çelik	İstanbul Başakşehir	Bandırmaspor	Loan
23 June 2023	(Turkey) Emre Kaplan	İstanbul Başakşehir	Bandırmaspor	Loan
26 June 2023	(Germany) Oğuzhan Matur	Zonguldak Kömürspor	Hatayspor	Free
28 June 2023	(Turkey) Onur Arı	Eskişehirspor	Hatayspor	€115k
28 June 2023	(Bosnia and Herzegovina) Riad Bajić	Giresunspor	MKE Ankaragücü	Undisclosed
28 June 2023	(Turkey) Hayrullah Bilazer	Giresunspor	MKE Ankaragücü	Undisclosed
28 June 2023	(Turkey) Görkem Sağlam	Giresunspor	Hatayspor	Free
29 June 2023	(Turkey) Enes Karakuş	İstanbul Başakşehir	1461 Trabzon	Loan
30 June 2023	(Croatia) Mislav Oršić	(England) Southampton	Trabzonspor	Undisclosed
1 July 2023	(Turkey) Emrecan Bulut	Somaspor	Beşiktaş	Undisclosed
2 July 2023	(Portugal) Nuno Sequeira	(Portugal) Braga	Pendikspor	Undisclosed
3 July 2023	(Brazil) Eduardo Bauermann	(Brazil) Santso	Alanyaspor	Free
3 July 2023	(Brazil) Carlos Eduardo	(Brazil) Palmeiras	Alanyaspor	Undisclosed
3 July 2023	(Brazil) Richard	(Brazil) Ceará	Alanyaspor	Undisclosed
4 July 2023	(Georgia (country)) Giorgi Aburjania	(Portugal) Gil Vicente	Hatayspor	Free
4 July 2023	(Angola) Loide Augusto	(Portugal) Mafra	Alanyaspor	Undisclosed
4 July 2023	(Turkey) Onur Demir	(Netherlands) ADO Den Haag	Alanyaspor	Undisclosed
4 July 2023	(Czech Republic) Matěj Hanousek	(Czech Republic) Sparta Prague	MKE Ankaragücü	Undisclosed
4 July 2023	(France) Nicolas Janvier	(Portugal) Vitória de Guimarães	Alanyaspor	Undisclosed
4 July 2023	(Turkey) Muhammed Emin Sarıgül	(Netherlands) Feyenoord	Alanyaspor	Undisclosed
4 July 2023	(Turkey) Muhammed Emin Sarıkaya	İstanbul Başakşehir	Ümraniyespor	Loan
4 July 2023	(Brazil) Anderson Silva	(Portugal) Vitória de Guimarães	Alanyaspor	Undisclosed
4 July 2023	(Turkey) Ertuğrul Taşkıran	Kasımpaşa	Alanyaspor	Undisclosed
5 July 2023	(Greece) Dimitrios Goutas	Trabzonspor	(Wales) Cardiff City	Free
5 July 2023	(Russia) Fyodor Kudryashov	Antalyaspor	(Russia) Fakel Voronezh	Free
5 July 2023	(Kazakhstan) Alexander Merkel	Gaziantep	(United Arab Emirates) Hatta	Free
5 July 2023	(Sweden) Carlos Strandberg	(Qatar) Al-Sailiya	Hatayspor	Free
6 July 2023	(Turkey) Emre Bilgin	Beşiktaş	Fatih Karagümrük	Loan
6 July 2023	(England) Fisayo Dele-Bashiru	(England) Sheffield Wednesday	Hatayspor	Free
6 July 2023	(Bosnia and Herzegovina) Armin Hodžić	(Bosnia and Herzegovina) Željezničar	Hatayspor	Free
7 July 2023	(Turkey) Tiago Çukur	Fenerbahçe	(Belgium) Beveren	Loan
7 July 2023	(Turkey) Arda Güler	Fenerbahçe	(Spain) Real Madrid	€20m
7 July 2023	(Serbia) Nikola Maksimović	(Italy) Genoa	Hatayspor	Free
8 July 2023	(Kosovo) Visar Bekaj	(Albania) Tirana	Hatayspor	Free
8 July 2023	(Austria) Can Keles	Austria Wien	Fatih Karagümrük	Loan
8 July 2023	(Turkey) Emre Taşdemir	Galatasaray	Pendikspor	Free
9 July 2023	(England) Marc Bola	(England) Middlesbrough	Samsunspor	Undisclosed
10 July 2023	(Algeria) Mehdi Abeid	(United Arab Emirates) Khor Fakkan	İstanbul Başakşehir	Free
10 July 2023	(Turkey) Tayfun Aydoğan	Kocaelispor	Adana Demirspor	Free
10 July 2023	(Croatia) Filip Benković	(Italy) Udinese	Trabzonspor	Loan
10 July 2023	(Italy) Fabio Borini	Fatih Karagümrük	(Italy) Sampdoria	Free
10 July 2023	(Turkey) Mert Çetin	(Italy) Hellas Verona	MKE Ankaragücü	Loan
10 July 2023	(Ghana) Alexander Djiku	(France) Strasbourg	Fenerbahçe	Free
11 July 2023	(Turkey) Efkan Bekiroğlu	Alanyaspor	MKE Ankaragücü	Undisclosed
11 July 2023	(Turkey) Tolga Ciğerci	(Germany) Hertha BSC	MKE Ankaragücü	Undisclosed
11 July 2023	(Turkey) İbrahim Demir	Uşakspor	Hatayspor	Undisclosed
11 July 2023	(Turkey) Caner Erkin	İstanbul Başakşehir	Eyüpspor	Free
11 July 2023	(Portugal) Joelson Fernandes	(Portugal) Sporting CP	Hatayspor	Free
11 July 2023	(Turkey) İlker Karakaş	Gençlerbirliği	Gaziantep	Undisclosed
11 July 2023	(Turkey) Umut Nayir	Eyüpspor	Fenerbahçe	Free
11 July 2023	(Portugal) João Novais	(United Arab Emirates) Al Bataeh	Alanyaspor	Undisclosed
11 July 2023	(Netherlands) Rick van Drongelen	(Germany) Union Berlin	Samsunspor	Undisclosed
12 July 2023	(Turkey) Ahmed Kutucu	İstanbul Başakşehir	Eyüpspor	Undisclosed
12 July 2023	(Gabon) David Sambissa	(Netherlands) Cambuur	İstanbulspor	Free
12 July 2023	(Poland) Sebastian Szymański	(Russia) Dynamo Moscow	Fenerbahçe	Undisclosed
13 July 2023	(Spain) Angeliño	(Germany) RB Leipzig	Galatasaray	Loan
13 July 2023	(Portugal) Nani	(Australia) Melbourne Victory	Adana Demirspor	Free
14 July 2023	(Turkey) Abdullah Aydın	Beşiktaş	Şanlıurfaspor	Loan
14 July 2023	(Turkey) Bilal Ceylan	Beşiktaş	Karşıyaka	Loan
14 July 2023	(Poland) Jakub Kałuziński	(Poland) Lechia Gdańsk	Antalyaspor	Undisclosed
14 July 2023	(Turkey) Kubilay Kanatsızkuş	Çaykur Rizespor	Göztepe	Undisclosed
14 July 2023	(Turkey) Sedat Şahintürk	Adana Demirspor	Menemen	Free
14 July 2023	(Turkey) Erdoğan Yeşilyurt	Sivasspor	Antalyaspor	Undisclosed
15 July 2023	(Turkey) Duhan Aksu	İstanbulspor	Kasımpaşa	Free
15 July 2023	(France) Iron Gomis	(France) Amiens	Kasımpaşa	Undisclosed
16 July 2023	(Turkey) Halil Dervişoğlu	(England) Brentford	Galatasaray	€500k
16 July 2023	(Turkey) Erdem Seçgin	İstanbulspor	Vanspor	Loan
16 July 2023	(Serbia) Dušan Tadić	(Netherlands) Ajax	Fenerbahçe	Free
17 July 2023	(Brazil) Jackson	(Albania) Egnatia	İstanbulspor	€400k
18 July 2023	(Poland) Adam Buksa	(France) Lens	Antalyaspor	Loan
18 July 2023	(Greece) Apostolos Diamantis	(Greece) OFI Crete	İstanbulspor	Free
18 July 2023	(Republic of the Congo) Francis Nzaba	İstanbul Başakşehir	Gençlerbirliği	Loan
18 July 2023	(Poland) Krzysztof Piątek	(Germany) Hertha BSC	İstanbul Başakşehir	Undisclosed
18 July 2023	(China) Wu Shaocong	İstanbul Başakşehir	Gençlerbirliği	Loan
19 July 2023	(Turkey) Göktan Gürpüz	(Germany) Borussia Dortmund	Trabzonspor	Undisclosed
19 July 2023	(Turkey) Mustafa Kapı	Adana Demirspor	Tuzlaspor	Loan
20 July 2023	(Turkey) Işık Kaan Arslan	Galatasaray	Fethiyespor	Loan
20 July 2023	(Brazil) Rodrigo Becão	(Italy) Udinese	Fenerbahçe	Undisclosed
20 July 2023	(Turkey) Necati Bilgiç	Beşiktaş	Adana 1954	Loan
20 July 2023	(Turkey) Bartuğ Elmaz	(France) Marseille	Fenerbahçe	Undisclosed
20 July 2023	(Turkey) Ahmet Gülay	Beşiktaş	Aliağa	Loan
20 July 2023	(Turkey) Erdoğan Kaya	Beşiktaş	Beyoğlu Yeni Çarşı	Loan
20 July 2023	(Algeria) Naoufel Khacef	(Portugal) Tondela	Gaziantep	Free
21 July 2023	(Ghana) Daniel Amartey	(England) Leicester City	Beşiktaş	Free
21 July 2023	(Italy) Andrea Bertolacci	Fatih Karagümrük	(Italy) Cremonese	Free
21 July 2023	(Cameroon) Jean Onana	(France) Lens	Beşiktaş	Undisclosed
21 July 2023	(Greece) Dimitrios Pelkas	Fenerbahçe	İstanbul Başakşehir	Free
21 July 2023	(England) Nathan Redmond	Beşiktaş	(England) Burnley	Free
21 July 2023	(Denmark) Mathias Ross	Galatasaray	(Netherlands) NEC	Loan
21 July 2023	(Turkey) Dorukhan Toköz	Trabzonspor	Adana Demirspor	Free
22 July 2023	(Poland) Rafał Gikiewicz	(Germany) FC Augsburg	MKE Ankaragücü	Free
23 July 2023	(Democratic Republic of the Congo) Cédric Bakambu	(United Arab Emirates) Al-Nasr	Galatasaray	€700k
24 July 2023	(Turkey) Muhammet Arslantaş	İstanbul Başakşehir	Şanlıurfaspor	Loan
24 July 2023	(Spain) Marc Bartra	Trabzonspor	(Spain) Real Betis	Free
24 July 2023	(England) Demeaco Duhaney	(England) Stoke City	İstanbulspor	Free
24 July 2023	(Guadeloupe) Andreaw Gravillon	(France) Reims	Adana Demirspor	Undisclosed
24 July 2023	(Morocco) Romain Saïss	Beşiktaş	(Qatar) AL Sadd	€2.5m
24 July 2023	(Turkey) Eray Sürül	İstanbul Başakşehir	Karaman	Loan
24 July 2023	(Hungary) Attila Szalai	Fenerbahçe	(Germany) 1899 Hoffenheim	€12.3m
24 July 2023	(Turkey) Ali Yavuz Kol	Adana Demirspor	Esenler Erokspor	Loan
24 July 2023	(Ivory Coast) Wilfried Zaha	(England) Crystal Palace	Galatasaray	Free
25 July 2023	(Kosovo) Fidan Aliti	(Switzerland) Zürich	Alanyaspor	Undisclosed
25 July 2023	(Turkey) Taylan Antalyalı	Galatasaray	Samsunspor	Loan
25 July 2023	(Turkey) Oğuzhan Berber	İstanbulspor	Manisa	Free
25 July 2023	(Ivory Coast) Max Gradel	Sivasspor	Gaziantep	Free
25 July 2023	(Turkey) Gökay Güney	Galatasaray	Kırşehir	Undisclosed
25 July 2023	(Turkey) Alper Uludağ	Giresunspor	MKE Ankaragücü	Undisclosed
26 July 2023	(Bosnia and Herzegovina) Adi Mehremić	İstanbulspor	(Azerbaijan) Sabail	Undisclosed
26 July 2023	(Republic of the Congo) Dylan Saint-Louis	Hatayspor	(Portugal) Vizela	Undisclosed
26 July 2023	(Lithuania) Modestas Vorobjovas	(Romania) Chindia Târgoviște	İstanbulspor	Free
27 July 2023	(Senegal) Racine Coly	(Portugal) Estoril	İstanbulspor	Free
28 July 2023	(Senegal) Mendy Mamadou	(Montenegro) Petrovac	İstanbulspor	Free
28 July 2023	(Turkey) Cem Türkmen	(France) Clermont Foot	MKE Ankaragücü	Undisclosed
29 July 2023	(Turkey) Eray Korkmaz	Somaspor	Çaykur Rizespor	Undisclosed
29 July 2023	(Turkey) Mustafa Şengül	Somaspor	Çaykur Rizespor	Undisclosed
30 July 2023	(Argentina) Mauro Icardi	(France) Paris Saint-Germain	Galatasaray	€10m
30 July 2023	(Turkey) Emre Kaplan	İstanbul Başakşehir	Ümraniyespor	Loan
31 July 2023	(Turkey) Atalay Babacan	Galatasaray	Boluspor	Undisclosed
31 July 2023	(Senegal) Lamine Diack	MKE Ankaragücü	(France) Nantes	Loan
31 July 2023	(Croatia) Ante Rebić	(Italy) Milan	Beşiktaş	Undisclosed
1 August 2023	(France) Paul Bernardoni	(France) Angers	Konyaspor	Undisclosed
1 August 2023	(Turkey) Ömer Faruk Beyaz	(Germany) VfB Stuttgart	Hatayspor	Loan
1 August 2023	(Kosovo) Zymer Bytyqi	(Greece) Olympiacos	Antalyaspor	Undisclosed
1 August 2023	(Romania) Alexandru Cicâldău	Galatasaray	Konyaspor	Loan
1 August 2023	(Germany) Kerem Demirbay	(Germany) Bayer Leverkusen	Galatasaray	€3.7m
1 August 2023	(Curaçao) Sherel Floranus	Antalyaspor	(Netherlands) Almere City	Undisclosed
1 August 2023	(Turkey) Günay Güvenç	Gaziantep	Galatasaray	€250k
1 August 2023	(Turkey) Batuhan Şen	Galatasaray	Gaziantep	Loan
2 August 2023	(Ivory Coast) Moussa Guel	Samsunspor	(France) Dunkerque	Loan
2 August 2023	(Georgia (country)) Saba Lobzhanidze	Hatayspor	(United States) Atlanta United	Undisclosed
2 August 2023	(Turkey) Mert Müldür	(Italy) Sassuolo	Fenerbahçe	Undisclosed
2 August 2023	(Uruguay) Diego Rossi	Fenerbahçe	(United States) Columbus Crew	Undisclosed
3 August 2023	(Canada) Sam Adekugbe	Hatayspor	(United States) Vancouver Whitecaps	Undisclosed
3 August 2023	(Cameroon) Guy Kilama	(France) Niort	Hatayspor	Undisclosed
4 August 2023	(Turkey) Emre Kılınç	Galatasaray	Samsunspor	Undisclosed
4 August 2023	(Colombia) Brayan Riascos	(Ukraine) Metalist Kharkiv	Gaziantep	Loan
4 August 2023	(Chile) Ángelo Sagal	Gaziantep	(Cyprus) Apollon Limassol	Free
4 August 2023	(United States) Haji Wright	Antalyaspor	(England) Coventry City	€9m
5 August 2023	(Uzbekistan) Husniddin Aliqulov	(Uzbekistan) Nasaf	Çaykur Rizespor	Undisclosed
5 August 2023	(Slovenia) Amir Feratovič	(Portugal) Estrela	Adana Demirspor	Undisclosed
5 August 2023	(Philippines) Gerrit Holtmann	(Germany) VfL Bochum	Antalyaspor	Loan
6 August 2023	(Turkey) Metehan Baltacı	Galatasaray	Eyüpspor	Loan
6 August 2023	(Turkey) Süleyman Luş	Galatasaray	Çorum	Undisclosed
7 August 2023	(Turkey) Eren Altıntaş	Eskişehirspor	Alanyaspor	Undisclosed
7 August 2023	(Turkey) Eren Aydın	Galatasaray	Çorum	Loan
7 August 2023	(Kosovo) Florent Hadergjonaj	Kasımpaşa	Alanyaspor	Undisclosed
8 August 2023	(Democratic Republic of the Congo) Britt Assombalonga	(England) Watford	Antalyaspor	Free
8 August 2023	(Guinea) Elhadj Bah	Samsunspor	(France) Dunkerque	Loan
8 August 2023	(Jamaica) Renaldo Cephas	(North Macedonia) Shkupi	MKE Ankaragücü	€400k
8 August 2023	(France) Bafétimbi Gomis	Galatasaray	(Japan) Kawasaki Frontale	Free
8 August 2023	(Cameroon) Didier Lamkel Zé	(Belgium) Kortrijk	Hatayspor	Undisclosed
8 August 2023	(Democratic Republic of the Congo) Salem M'Bakata	(Greece) Aris	Gaziantep	€250k
8 August 2023	(Italy) Emiliano Viviano	Fatih Karagümrük	(Italy) Ascoli	Free
9 August 2023	(Senegal) M'Baye Niang	(France) Auxerre	Adana Demirspor	Free
9 August 2023	(Turkey) Baran Sarka	Nevşehir	Hatayspor	Undisclosed
10 August 2023	(Turkey) Ayberk Kaygısız	İstanbul Başakşehir	Isparta 32 Spor	Loan
10 August 2023	(Spain) Pinchi	(Spain) Las Palmas	Çaykur Rizespor	Undisclosed
10 August 2023	(Turkey) Özcan Şahan	23 Elazığ	İstanbulspor	Undisclosed
10 August 2023	(Brazil) Tetê	(Ukraine) Shakhtar Donetsk	Galatasaray	Free
10 August 2023	(Bosnia and Herzegovina) Dal Varešanović	(Bosnia and Herzegovina) Sarajevo	Çaykur Rizespor	Undisclosed
10 August 2023	(Kosovo) Altin Zeqiri	(Finland) Lahti	Çaykur Rizespor	Undisclosed
11 August 2023	(Turkey) Ünal Durmuşhan	(Germany) Viktoria Berlin	Hatayspor	Undisclosed
11 August 2023	(Senegal) Mame Mor Faye	(Senegal) Darou Salam	Çaykur Rizespor	Undisclosed
11 August 2023	(Senegal) Alassane Ndao	(Saudi Arabia) Al-Ahli	İstanbulspor	Free
11 August 2023	(Nigeria) Henry Onyekuru	Adana Demirspor	(Saudi Arabia) Al-Fayha	Undisclosed
11 August 2023	(Turkey) Ogün Özçiçek	Yeni Malatyaspor	Gaziantep	Loan
11 August 2023	(Ivory Coast) Djakaridja Junior Traoré	(South Africa) TS Galaxy	İstanbulspor	Undisclosed
11 August 2023	(Turkey) Berkay Vardar	Beşiktaş	(Moldova) Sheriff Tiraspol	Loan
12 August 2023	(Turkey) Sadik Baş	Hatayspor	Tuzlaspor	Free
12 August 2023	(Turkey) Oğuz Ceylan	Çaykur Rizespor	Kocaelispor	Undisclosed
12 August 2023	(Turkey) İlhami Siraçhan Nas	Ankaraspor	Galatasaray	€337k
13 August 2023	(Brazil) Fred	(England) Manchester United	Fenerbahçe	€10m
13 August 2023	(Turkey) Berkay Görmez	İstanbulspor	Aliağa	Undisclosed
13 August 2023	(Turkey) Cengiz Ünder	(France) Marseille	Fenerbahçe	€15m
14 August 2023	(England) Alex Oxlade-Chamberlain	(England) Liverpool	Beşiktaş	Free
15 August 2023	(Guinea-Bissau) Janio Bikel	(Russia) Khimki	Gaziantep	Free
15 August 2023	(Italy) Federico Ceccherini	(Italy) Hellas Verona	Fatih Karagümrük	Loan
15 August 2023	(Turkey) Arda Okan Kurtulan	Adana Demirspor	Diyarbekirspor	Loan
15 August 2023	(Italy) Kevin Lasagna	(Italy) Hellas Verona	Fatih Karagümrük	Loan
16 August 2023	(Germany) Bünyamin Balat	Adana Demirspor	Diyarbekirspor	Loan
16 August 2023	(Austria) Yusuf Demir	Galatasaray	(Switzerland) Basel	Loan
16 August 2023	(Egypt) Omar Fayed	(Egypt) Al Mokawloon	Fenerbahçe	€551k
16 August 2023	(Kosovo) Milot Rashica	(England) Norwich City	Beşiktaş	Undisclosed
16 August 2023	(Turkey) Hasan Yurtseven	Gaziantep	Kırklarelispor	Free
18 August 2023	(Belgium) Nacer Chadli	İstanbul Başakşehir	(Belgium) Westerlo	Free
18 August 2023	(Bosnia and Herzegovina) Ajdin Hasić	Beşiktaş	(Bosnia and Herzegovina) Sarajevo	Loan
18 August 2023	(Brazil) Naldo	(Saudi Arabia) Al-Taawoun	Antalyaspor	Undisclosed
18 August 2023	(Brazil) Gustavo Sauer	(Brazil) Botafogo	Çaykur Rizespor	Loan
18 August 2023	(Greece) Manolis Siopis	Trabzonspor	(Wales) Cardiff City	Free
18 August 2023	(Netherlands) Sander van de Streek	(Netherlands) Utrecht	Antalyaspor	Undisclosed
18 August 2023	(Italy) Nicolò Zaniolo	Galatasaray	(England) Aston Villa	Loan
19 August 2023	(Cape Verde) Garry Rodrigues	(Greece) Olympiacos	MKE Ankaragücü	Undisclosed
19 August 2023	(Morocco) Hakim Ziyech	(England) Chelsea	Galatasaray	Loan
20 August 2023	(Romania) Olimpiu Moruțan	Galatasaray	MKE Ankaragücü	€3m
20 August 2023	(Turkey) Yusuf Türk	Gaziantep	Kastamonuspor 1966	Undisclosed
21 August 2023	(Kazakhstan) Bakhtiyar Zaynutdinov	(Russia) CSKA Moscow	Beşiktaş	Undisclosed
22 August 2023	(Uruguay) Maxi Gómez	Trabzonspor	(Spain) Cádiz	Loan
23 August 2023	(Turkey) Berk Balaban	Galatasaray	Isparta 32 Spor	Loan
23 August 2023	(Ivory Coast) Simon Deli	Adana Demirspor	İstanbulspor	Free
23 August 2023	(Turkey) Caner Doğan	Galatasaray	Sarıyer	Loan
23 August 2023	(Turkey) Kerem Kalafat	Beşiktaş	Çorum	Undisclosed
23 August 2023	(Turkey) Burak Öksüz	Hatayspor	Kocaelispor	Undisclosed
25 August 2023	(Turkey) Onur Ergün	Hatayspor	İstanbul Başakşehir	Free
25 August 2023	(Croatia) Dominik Livaković	(Croatia) Dinamo Zagreb	Fenerbahçe	€6.65m
25 August 2023	(Hungary) Attila Mocsi	(Hungary) Zalaegerszeg	Çaykur Rizespor	Undisclosed
25 August 2023	(Bosnia and Herzegovina) Dario Šarić	(Italy) Palermo	Antalyaspor	Loan
26 August 2023	(Turkey) Yunus Akgün	Galatasaray	(England) Leicester City	Loan
26 August 2023	(Turkey) Kerem Atakan Kesgin	Beşiktaş	Fatih Karagümrük	Loan
26 August 2023	(Turkey) Yusuf Barası	(Netherlands) AZ	Adana Demirspor	Undisclosed
27 August 2023	(Algeria) Ahmed Touba	İstanbul Başakşehir	(Italy) Lecce	Loan
28 August 2023	(Spain) Javi Montero	Beşiktaş	(Portugal) Arouca	Loan
29 August 2023	(Senegal) Ousseynou Ba	(Greece) Olympiacos	İstanbul Başakşehir	Loan
29 August 2023	(Turkey) Salih Kavrazlı	Adana Demirspor	Nazilli Belediyespor	Loan
29 August 2023	(Cape Verde) Zé Luís	Hatayspor	(Portugal) Farense	Free
29 August 2023	(Turkey) Alpaslan Öztürk	Galatasaray	Pendikspor	Undisclosed
29 August 2023	(Italy) Flavio Paoletti	(Italy) Sampdoria	Fatih Karagümrük	Loan
29 August 2023	(Turkey) İzzet Topatar	Elazığspor	İstanbulspor	Undisclosed
29 August 2023	(Turkey) Bertuğ Yıldırım	Hatayspor	(France) Rennes	Undisclosed
30 August 2023	(Turkey) Emirhan İlkhan	(Italy) Torino	İstanbul Başakşehir	Loan
30 August 2023	(Democratic Republic of the Congo) Giannelli Imbula	Tuzlaspor	İstanbulspor	Free
30 August 2023	(Turkey) İlhami Siraçhan Nas	Galatasaray	Ümraniyespor	Loan
30 August 2023	(Kosovo) Jetmir Topalli	İstanbulspor	Manisa	Loan
31 August 2023	(Algeria) Zinedine Ferhat	Alanyaspor	(France) Angers	Free
31 August 2023	(Norway) Fredrik Gulbrandsen	Adana Demirspor	(Norway) Molde	Undisclosed
31 August 2023	(Turkey) Berkan Kutlu	Galatasaray	(Italy) Genoa	Loan
1 September 2023	(Turkey) Altay Bayındır	Fenerbahçe	(England) Manchester United	€5m
1 September 2023	(Guinea) Sékou Bangoura	İstanbul Başakşehir	Tuzlaspor	Loan
1 September 2023	(Greece) Apostolos Diamantis	İstanbulspor	(Romania) FC U Craiova	Free
1 September 2023	(Algeria) Faouzi Ghoulam	(France) Angers	Hatayspor	Free
1 September 2023	(Denmark) Carlo Holse	(Norway) Rosenborg	Samsunspor	Undisclosed
1 September 2023	(Portugal) Rúben Ribeiro	Hatayspor	(Portugal) Chaves	Free
1 September 2023	(Austria) Enes Tepecik	(Austria) Rapid Wien	MKE Ankaragücü	Undisclosed
1 September 2023	(Bosnia and Herzegovina) Ognjen Vranješ	Hatayspor	(Serbia) Čukarički	Undisclosed
2 September 2023	(Austria) Ercan Kara	(United States) Orlando City	Samsunspor	Undisclosed
2 September 2023	(Republic of the Congo) Chandrel Massanga	(Albania) Partizani	Hatayspor	Undisclosed
3 September 2023	(Spain) Juan Mata	Galatasaray	(Japan) Vissel Kobe	Free
3 September 2023	(Kosovo) Arbër Zeneli	(France) Reims	Adana Demirspor	Undisclosed
4 September 2023	(Switzerland) Albian Ajeti	(Scotland) Celtic	Gaziantep	€585k
4 September 2023	(Turkey) Tayfur Bingöl	Alanyaspor	Beşiktaş	Undisclosed
4 September 2023	(Colombia) Davinson Sánchez	(England) Tottenham Hotspur	Galatasaray	€9.5m
5 September 2023	(Ivory Coast) Eric Bailly	(England) Manchester United	Beşiktaş	Undisclosed
5 September 2023	(France) Mounir Chouiar	İstanbul Başakşehir	(Bulgaria) Ludogorets Razgrad	Undisclosed
5 September 2023	(Azerbaijan) Renat Dadashov	(Switzerland) Grasshoppers	Hatayspor	Loan
5 September 2023	(North Macedonia) Jovan Manev	Adana Demirspor	(Croatia) Osijek	Loan
5 September 2023	(Senegal) Cherif Ndiaye	Adana Demirspor	(Serbia) Red Star Belgrade	€4m
5 September 2023	(France) Tanguy Ndombele	(England) Tottenham Hotspur	Galatasaray	Loan
6 September 2023	(Turkey) Selim Ay	Çaykur Rizespor	Tuzlaspor	Loan
6 September 2023	(Turkey) Emin Bayram	Galatasaray	(Belgium) Westerlo	Loan
6 September 2023	(Turkey) Doğucan Haspolat	Trabzonspor	(Belgium) Westerlo	Undisclosed
7 September 2023	(Norway) Fredrik Midtsjø	Galatasaray	Pendikspor	€3m
7 September 2023	(Honduras) Rigoberto Rivas	(Italy) Reggino	Hatayspor	Undisclosed
9 September 2023	(Bulgaria) Martin Minchev	(Czech Republic) Sparta Prague	Çaykur Rizespor	Undisclosed
9 September 2023	(Brazil) Júnior Morais	(Romania) Rapid București	Gaziantep	Free
9 September 2023	(Romania) Florin Niță	(Czech Republic) Sparta Prague	Gaziantep	Free
10 September 2023	(Denmark) Casper Højer	(Czech Republic) Sparta Prague	Çaykur Rizespor	Undisclosed
11 September 2023	(Cameroon) Nicolas Nkoulou	(Greece) Aris	Gaziantep	Undisclosed
13 September 2023	(Romania) Denis Drăguș	(Belgium) Standard Liège	Gaziantep	Loan
14 September 2023	(Turkey) Oğulcan Çağlayan	Galatasaray	Gaziantep	Undisclosed
14 September 2023	(Argentina) Adolfo Gaich	(Russia) CSKA Moscow	Çaykur Rizespor	Loan
14 September 2023	(Serbia) Adem Ljajić	Fatih Karagümrük	(Serbia) Novi Pazar	Undisclosed
14 September 2023	(Ghana) Jerome Opoku	(Portugal) Arouca	İstanbul Başakşehir	Loan
14 September 2023	(England) Jonjo Shelvey	(England) Nottingham Forest	Çaykur Rizespor	Loan
15 September 2023	(Turkey) Baran Aksaka	Galatasaray	Şanlıurfaspor	Loan
15 September 2023	(Germany) Eyüp Aydın	(Germany) Bayern Munich II	Galatasaray	€250k
15 September 2023	(Turkey) Musa Çağıran	Hatayspor	Gençlerbirliği	Undisclosed
15 September 2023	(Nigeria) Emmanuel Dennis	(England) Nottingham Forest	İstanbul Başakşehir	Loan
15 September 2023	(France) Léo Dubois	Galatasaray	İstanbul Başakşehir	Loan
15 September 2023	(Finland) Janne-Pekka Laine	(Finland) Haka	Çaykur Rizespor	Undisclosed
21 September 2023	(Turkey) Gökdeniz Gürpüz	(Germany) Borussia Dortmund	Galatasaray	€220k
