= 2024–25 Hatayspor season =

Hatayspor
2024–25 season
- Manager: Özhan Pulat (until 7 September); Rıza Çalımbay (from 9 September)
- Stadium: Mersin Stadium
- Süper Lig: 18th
- Turkish Cup: Fifth round
- Top goalscorer: League: Vincent Aboubakar; Carlos Strandberg (3 each); All: Carlos Strandberg (6)
- Average home league attendance: 4,275
- All statistics correct as of 23 December 2024.

The 2024–25 season is Hatayspor's 58th in its history and its fifth consecutive season in the Turkish Süper Lig. The team also competed in the Turkish Cup, starting from the third round.

== Transfers ==
| Pos. | Player | Transferred from | Fee | Date | Source |
|---|---|---|---|---|---|
| FW | (Nigeria) Jonathan Okoronkwo | | Undisclosed | 12 July 2024 | |
| MF | (Senegal) Lamine Diack | | Loan | 30 July 2024 | |
| MF | (France) Bilal Boutobba | | Undisclosed | 2 September 2024 | |
| FW | (Cameroon) Vincent Aboubakar | | Free | 9 September 2024 | |
| DF | (Costa Rica) Francisco Calvo | | Undisclosed | 10 September 2024 | |

== Friendlies ==
| 13 July 2024 Friendly | Hatayspor (Turkey) | 1–1 | (Azerbaijan) Sabail |

| 21 July 2024 Friendly | Hatayspor (Turkey) | 1–1 | (Iran) Sepahan |

| 27 July 2024 Friendly | İstanbulspor (Turkey) | 2–0 | (Turkey) Hatayspor |

| 31 July 2024 Friendly | Hatayspor (Turkey) | 1–1 | (Saudi Arabia) Al-Hazm |

== Competitions ==
=== Overall record ===
| Competition | First match | Last match | Starting round | Final position | Record | | | | | | | |
| Competition | First match | Last match | Starting round | Final position | Pld | W | D | L | GF | GA | GD | Win % |
|---|---|---|---|---|---|---|---|---|---|---|---|---|
| Süper Lig | 9 August 2024 | | Matchday 1 | | 17 | 1 | 6 | 10 | 15 | 29 | −14 | 5.88 |
| Turkish Cup | 30 October 2024 | 19 December 2024 | Third round | Fifth round | 3 | 2 | 0 | 1 | 9 | 1 | +8 | 66.67 |
| Total | | | | | 20 | 3 | 6 | 11 | 24 | 30 | −6 | 15.00 |

Last updated: 5 January 2025
Source: Competitions

=== Süper Lig ===
==== League table ====
| Pos | Team | Pld | W | D | L | GF | GA | GD | Pts | Qualification or relegation |
|---|---|---|---|---|---|---|---|---|---|---|
| 15 | Antalyaspor | 36 | 12 | 8 | 16 | 37 | 62 | −25 | 44 | |
| 16 | Bodrum (R) | 36 | 9 | 10 | 17 | 26 | 43 | −17 | 37 | Relegation to 2025–26 TFF First League |
| 17 | Sivasspor (R) | 36 | 9 | 8 | 19 | 44 | 60 | −16 | 35 | Relegation to 2025–26 TFF First League |
| 18 | Hatayspor (R) | 36 | 6 | 8 | 22 | 47 | 74 | −27 | 26 | Relegation to 2025–26 TFF First League |
| 19 | Adana Demirspor (R) | 36 | 3 | 5 | 28 | 34 | 92 | −58 | 2 (Note: Adana Demirspor had 12 points deducted.) | Relegation to 2025–26 TFF First League |

Source: Süper Lig
Rules for classification: 1) Points; 2) Head-to-head points; 3) Head-to-head goal difference; 4) Head-to-head goals scored; 5) Goal difference; 6) Goals scored; 7) Play-off.
(Note: Head-to-head record is used only after all the matches between the teams in question have been played)
(R) Relegated

==== Results summary ====
| Overall | | | | | | | | Home | | | | | | Away | | | | | |
| Pld | W | D | L | GF | GA | GD | Pts | W | D | L | GF | GA | GD | W | D | L | GF | GA | GD |
|---|---|---|---|---|---|---|---|---|---|---|---|---|---|---|---|---|---|---|---|
| 17 | 1 | 6 | 10 | 15 | 29 | −14 | 9 | 1 | 4 | 4 | 8 | 13 | −5 | 0 | 2 | 6 | 7 | 16 | −9 |

Last updated: 5 January 2025.

==== Results by round ====
| Round | 1 | 2 | 3 | 4 | 5 | 6 | 7 | 8 | 9 | 10 | 11 | 12 | 13 | 14 | 15 | 16 | 17 | 18 |
|---|---|---|---|---|---|---|---|---|---|---|---|---|---|---|---|---|---|---|
| Ground | A | H | A | H | A | H | | H | A | H | A | H | A | H | A | H | H | A |
| Result | L | D | L | L | D | L | B | D | L | L | L | W | D | D | L | D | L | L |
| Position | | | | | | | | | | | | | | | | | | |

Updated to match(es) played on 5 January 2025. Source: TFF
A = Away; H = Home; W = Win; D = Draw; L = Loss

==== Matches ====
The league schedule was released on 11 July.

| 9 August 2024 1 | Galatasaray | 2–1 | Hatayspor | Sarıyer |
| | Icardi 80' (pen.); Batshuayi 90' | | Fernandes 52' | Stadium: Rams Park |

| 19 August 2024 2 | Hatayspor | 1–1 | Kasımpaşa | Mersin |
| | | | | Stadium: Mersin Stadium |

| 25 August 2024 3 | Antalyaspor | 3–2 | Hatayspor |

| 1 September 2024 4 | Hatayspor | 0–3 | Samsunspor | Mersin |
| | | | | Stadium: Mersin Stadium |

| 15 September 2024 5 | Alanyaspor | 0–0 | Hatayspor |

| 20 September 2024 6 | Hatayspor | 0–1 | Bodrum | Mersin |
| | | | | Stadium: Mersin Stadium |

| 7 | Bye |

| 5 October 2024 8 | Hatayspor | 1–1 | Trabzonspor | Mersin |
| | | | | Stadium: Mersin Stadium |

| 20 October 2024 9 | Sivasspor | 3–2 | Hatayspor |

| 26 October 2024 10 | Hatayspor | 0–1 | Kayserispor | Mersin |
| | | | | Stadium: Mersin Stadium |

| 3 November 2024 11 | Eyüpspor | 2–0 | Hatayspor |

| 9 November 2024 12 | Hatayspor | 3–1 | Gaziantep | Mersin |
| | | | | Stadium: Mersin Stadium |

| 24 November 2024 13 | Konyaspor | 1–1 | Hatayspor |

| 2 December 2024 14 | Hatayspor | 1–1 | Beşiktaş | Mersin |
| | | | | Stadium: Mersin Stadium |

| 8 December 2024 15 | İstanbul Başakşehir | 3–0 | Hatayspor |

| 15 December 2024 16 | Hatayspor | 1–1 | Göztepe | Mersin |
| | | | | Stadium: Mersin Stadium |

| 23 December 2024 17 | Hatayspor | 1–3 | Adana Demirspor | Mersin |
| 20:00 UTC+3 | Calvo (yellow card) 7'; Yılmaz (yellow card) 15'; Sağlam (yellow card) 32'; Aboubakar 25'; Demir (red card) 53'; Fernandes (yellow card) 63'; Bamgboye (yellow card) 79' | | Burak (yellow card) 56'; Güler 61'; Demirbağ 70'; Aimbetov 75', (yellow card) 76'; Ersoy (yellow card) 90+6' | Stadium: Mersin Stadium |

| 5 January 2025 18 | Fenerbahçe | 2–1 | Hatayspor | Kadıköy |
| 19:00 UTC+3 | | | | Stadium: Şükrü Saracoğlu Stadium |

=== Turkish Cup ===
| 30 October 2024 Third round | İnegöl Kafkasspor | 0–4 | Hatayspor |
| | | | Strandberg 4'; Parmak 17'; Boutobba 35'; Temel 66' |

| 5 December 2024 Fourth round | Hatayspor | 5–0 | Osmaniyespor |
| | Strandberg 23', 45+1'; Pedro 66'; Bamgboye 74'; Aboubakar 90+2' |

| 19 December 2024 Fifth round | İskenderunspor | 1–0 | Hatayspor |
| | Sağlam 43' (o.g.) |
