= Rigoberto Rivas =

Honduran footballer (born 1998)

Personal information
- Full name: Rigoberto Manuel Rivas Vindel
- Date of birth: 31 July 1998 (age 28)
- Place of birth: Balfate, Honduras
- Height: 1.78 m (5 ft 10 in)
- Positions: Winger; right-back

Team information
- Current team: Kocaelispor
- Number: 99

Youth career
- 2011–2012: Fiorentina
- 2012–2013: Sestese
- 2013–2016: Prato
- 2016–2017: → Inter Milan (loan)

Senior career*
Years	Team	Apps	(Gls)
2016–2017	Prato	1	(0)
2017–2021	Inter Milan	0	(0)
2017–2018	→ Brescia (loan)	15	(0)
2018–2019	→ Ternana (loan)	10	(0)
2019–2021	→ Reggina (loan)	43	(7)
2021–2023	Reggina	65	(5)
2023–2025	Hatayspor	46	(6)
2025–	Kocaelispor	35	(3)

International career^{‡}
2019–2021	Honduras U23	8	(1)
2019–	Honduras	28	(1)
Medal record
Men's football
Representing Honduras
CONCACAF Nations League
Bronze medal – third place	2021
- * Club domestic league appearances and goals as of 16 August 2026 ‡ National team caps and goals as of 16 August 2026

Rigoberto Manuel Rivas Vindel (born 31 July 1998) is a Honduran professional footballer who plays for Süper Lig club Kocaelispor and the Honduras national team. Mainly a winger, he can also play as a forward, an attacking or wide midfielder, and as a full-back.

== Club career ==
=== Early life ===
Rivas was born in Balfate, Honduras. As a young child, his mother left Honduras for Spain in search of a better future, but she was unable to gain employment. She then decided to move to Italy, where there she could establish herself, and Rivas left Honduras at the age of 11 to reunite with his mother. Rivas speaks both Spanish and Italian.

=== Prato ===
After brief stints with local Florence clubs, Fiorentina and Sestese, Rivas joined Lega Pro club Prato in 2013. He made his professional debut on 8 May 2016, in a 3–1 home victory over Savona in the league.

=== Internazionale ===
On 30 August 2016, Rivas joined Inter Milan on a season-long loan from Prato. He was a member of the under-19 team that won 2016–17 Campionato Nazionale Primavera, defeating Fiorentina 2–1 in the final.

He received his first call-up to Inter's first team for the final Serie A match of the season against Udinese on 28 May 2017 by Stefano Vecchi, who was the coach of the youth team as well as a caretaker for the first team. Rivas was an unused substitute in a 5–2 win. He made his non-competitive debut for the first team on 9 July 2017, in a preseason game against WSG Wattens. He was signed by Inter outright on 7 July.

==== Loan to Brescia ====
On 31 August 2017, he was signed by Serie B club Brescia on a season-long loan deal with an option to buy. On 10 September, he made his Serie B debut for Brescia as a substitute, replacing Matteo Cortesi in the 64th minute of a 1–0 away win over Parma. On 8 October, Rivas played his first match as a starter for Brescia, a 3–0 away defeat against Virtus Entella, he was replaced by Alessandro Martinelli in the 74th minute. On 20 October, he played his first entire match for Brescia, a 2–0 away defeat against Cremonese.

==== Loan to Ternana ====
On 21 July 2018, Rivas joined Ternana Calcio on loan until 30 June 2019. He made his debut in the second round of the Coppa Italia against Carpi and scored the second goal in a 2–0 win.

==== Loan to Reggina ====
On 2 September 2019, he joined Serie C side Reggina 1914 on loan. The following 23 November, Rivas scored his first goal in a 4–1 win against Rende. On 27 August 2020, Inter Milan and Reggina renewed the loan spell for another season after Reggina's promotion to Serie B.

=== Reggina ===
On 30 June 2021, he moved to Reggina on a permanent basis and signed a contract until 30 June 2025.

=== Hatayspor ===
On 7 September 2023, Rivas joined Turkish Süper Lig club Hatayspor on a 3-year deal.

=== Kocaelispor ===
On 9 February 2025, Kocaelispor of the Turkish second tier announced the signing of Rivas on a 2.5–year contract.

== International career ==
In June 2017, Rivas received a call-up from Honduras national team and was included in the provisional roster for the 2017 CONCACAF Gold Cup, however he was dropped from the final squad. He did receive a call-up for friendlies against Paraguay and Brazil on 5 and 9 June 2019 and made his debut against Paraguay – as a starter – in a 1–1 draw.

In March 2021, Rivas played in the 2020 CONCACAF Men's Olympic Qualifying Championship and helped Honduras successfully qualify for the nation's fourth straight Olympic football tournament. On 2 July, he was included in the final 22-man squad for the tournament in Tokyo, Japan. He played in all three group stage matches and scored the winning goal in the second match against New Zealand.

On 13 October 2025, Rivas scored his first goal for the senior national team, the opener in a 3–0 win against Haiti in 2026 FIFA World Cup qualifying.

== Career statistics ==
=== Club ===
As of 16 August 2026

Club	Season	League			Cup (Note: Includes Coppa Italia and Turkish Cup)		Continental		Other (Note: Includes Coppa Italia Serie C)		Total	
Club	Season	Division	Apps	Goals	Apps	Goals	Apps	Goals	Apps	Goals	Apps	Goals
Prato	2015–16	Serie C	1	0	0	0	—		0	0	1	0
Internazionale	2016–17	Serie A	0	0	0	0	—		0	0	0	0
Brescia (loan)	2017–18	Serie B	15	0	0	0	—		0	0	15	0
Ternana (loan)	2018–19	Serie C	10	0	2	1	—		1	0	13	1
Ternana (loan)	Total		26	0	2	1	—		1	0	29	1
Reggina (loan)	2019–20	Serie C	16	2	0	0	—		1	0	17	2
Reggina (loan)	2020–21	Serie B	27	5	0	0	—		0	0	27	5
Reggina	2021–22	Serie B	27	2	1	0	—		0	0	28	2
Reggina	2022–23	Serie B	38	3	1	0	—		0	0	39	3
Reggina	Total		108	12	2	0	—		1	0	111	12
Hatayspor	2023–24	Süper Lig	29	5	3	0	—		0	0	32	5
Hatayspor	2024–25	Süper Lig	17	1	0	0	—		0	0	17	1
Hatayspor	Total		46	6	3	0	—		0	0	49	6
Kocaelispor	2024–25	TFF 1. Lig	12	2	1	0	—		0	0	13	2
Kocaelispor	2025–26	Süper Lig	22	1	5	0	—		0	0	27	1
Kocaelispor	2026–27	Süper Lig	1	0	0	0	—		0	0	1	0
Kocaelispor	Total		35	3	6	0	—		0	0	41	3
Career total			215	21	13	1	—		2	0	230	21

=== International ===
As of match played 6 June 2026

Appearances and goals by national team and year
National team	Year	Apps	Goals
Honduras	2019	7	0
Honduras	2020	–	
Honduras	2021	8	0
Honduras	2022	2	0
Honduras	2023	4	0
Honduras	2024	4	0
Honduras	2025	1	1
Honduras	2026	2	0
Total		28	1

Scores and results list Honduras's goal tally first, score column indicates score after each Rivas goal.

List of international goals scored by Rigoberto Rivas
No.	Date	Venue	Opponent	Score	Result	Competition
1	13 October 2025	Chelato Uclés National Stadium, Tegucigalpa, Honduras	Haiti	1–0	3–0	2026 FIFA World Cup qualification

== Honours ==
Internazionale Primavera

- Campionato Nazionale Primavera: 2016–17

Reggina

- Serie C: 2019–20

Kocaelispor

- TFF 1. Lig: 2024–25
