= Kilama =

Kilama is a surname. Notable people with the surname include:

- Guy Kilama (born 1999), Cameroonian footballer
- Jean-Jacques Kilama (born 1985), Cameroonian-born Hong Kong footballer
