= Carlos Strandberg =

Swedish footballer

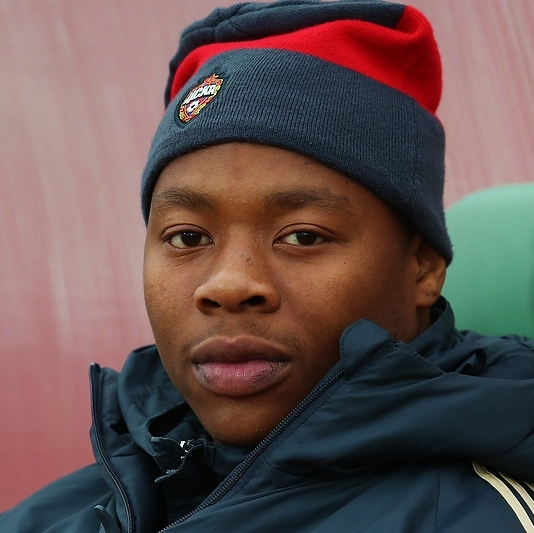
- Strandberg with CSKA Moscow in 2015

Personal information
- Full name: Sergio Carlos Strandberg
- Date of birth: 14 April 1996 (age 30)
- Place of birth: Gothenburg, Sweden
- Height: 1.87 m (6 ft 2 in)
- Position: Forward

Team information
- Current team: Qingdao Hainiu
- Number: 10

Youth career
- 2002–2004: Backa IF
- 2005–2011: Hisingsbacka FC
- 2012–2013: BK Häcken

Senior career*
Years	Team	Apps	(Gls)
2011	Hisingsbacka FC	5	(0)
2013–2014	BK Häcken	30	(9)
2015–2017	CSKA Moscow	19	(5)
2015	→ Ural (loan)	2	(0)
2016	→ AIK (loan)	12	(7)
2017	Club Brugge	0	(0)
2017	→ KVC Westerlo (loan)	5	(1)
2017–2020	Malmö FF	29	(9)
2019	→ Örebro SK (loan)	19	(11)
2019–2020	→ Al-Hazem (loan)	18	(9)
2020–2022	Al-Hazem	23	(5)
2020–2021	→ Abha (loan)	28	(16)
2022–2023	Al-Sailiya	30	(12)
2023–2025	Hatayspor	63	(12)
2026–	Qingdao Hainiu	25	(5)

International career^{‡}
2013	Sweden U17	7	(1)
2013–2015	Sweden U19	13	(4)
2015–2018	Sweden U21	18	(13)
- * Club domestic league appearances and goals as of 22 November 2026 ‡ National team caps and goals as of 9 June 2018 (UTC)

Sergio Carlos Strandberg (born 14 April 1996) is a Swedish professional footballer who plays as a forward for Qingdao Hainiu.

== Club career ==
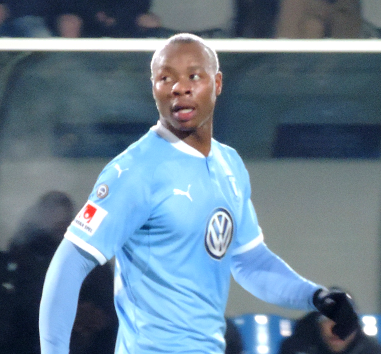
Strandberg playing for Malmö FF in 2018

Born to a Swedish father and a mother who is Portuguese with Mozambican heritage, Strandberg grew up in Backa, Gothenburg, where he joined the local lower league side Backa IF as a six-year-old. In 2005 the club merged with Hisingstads IS to form Hisingsbacka FC which is where Strandberg stayed and eventually got to make his first team debut in the seventh tier of Swedish football at age 15.

In 2012, he signed a youth contract with Gothenburg based Allsvenskan club BK Häcken. There he became the top goalscorer of the U17 league and was moved up to the U19 team at the end of the year. In 2013, he continued scoring goals for the U19 and U21 teams which in the summer resulted in Häcken signing him to a 4.5-year professional contract.

=== CSKA Moscow ===
In the summer of 2014, he was subject for a move to German side Borussia Dortmund but the player failed the medical, so the transfer did not materialize. However, in the following transfer window, he joined Russian Premier League side CSKA Moscow on a 5-year contract, 2 February 2015.

On 21 August 2015, Strandberg joined Ural on loan till the end of 2015.

On 31 March 2016, Strandberg moved to AIK Fotboll on a loan deal until mid-July. After scoring seven goals in ten games Strandberg caught negative attention by grabbing teammate Daniel Sundgren by the throat after a 3–2 win against Falkenberg causing a two-game suspension.

=== Club Brugge ===
On 5 January 2017, he moved to Belgium to Club Brugge, signing a contract that would run until 2021. Twelve days later, he was sent on loan to Westerlo until the end of the 2016–17 season.

=== Malmö FF ===
On 9 August 2017, Club Brugge agreed a fee in the excess of €1 million with Swedish champions Malmö FF for Strandberg who was set for a medical the same day ahead of a permanent move with a contract until 2021. Later that afternoon Strandberg was unveiled as a Malmö FF player. Strandberg scored a goal in the game against IFK Norrköping that won Malmö FF the 2017 Allsvenskan title.

=== Al-Hazem ===
On 30 August 2019, Al-Hazem signed Strandberg for one season from Malmö FF.

==== Loan to Abha ====
On 18 October 2020, Abha signed Strandberg for one season from Al-Hazem.

=== Al-Sailiya ===
Strandberg played for Qatari side Al-Sailiya in the 2022–23 season, where he helped the club win the Qatari Stars Cup by scoring a goal in their thrilling 5–4 victory over Al-Wakrah in the final.

=== Hatayspor ===
On 5 July 2023, he signed with Hatayspor. In the 2023–24 season, he emerged as the joint-top scorer for his club with eight goals along with Fisayo Dele-Bashiru, including a crucial goal on the final matchday in a 2–0 win over Rizespor, securing his club's survival in the top tier.

=== Qingdao Hainiu ===
On 3 February 2026, Strandberg transferred to Chinese Super League club Qingdao Hainiu.

== International career ==
In September 2013, Strandberg was selected to the Sweden men's national under-17 football team that would compete in the 2013 FIFA U-17 World Cup. As his mother is Portuguese with Mozambican roots, he could potentially represent one of those countries at international level, should he be selected.

== Career statistics ==
=== Club ===
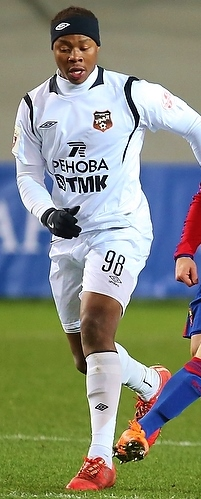
Strandberg playing for Ural Yekaterinburg in 2015

As of match played 31 October 2025

Appearances and goals by club, season and competition
Club	Season	League			National cup (Note: Includes Svenska Cupen, Russian Cup, King Cup, Turkish Cup)		Continental		Total	
Club	Season	Division	Apps	Goals	Apps	Goals	Apps	Goals	Apps	Goals
BK Häcken	2013	Allsvenskan	11	3	1	1	2	0	14	4
BK Häcken	2014	Allsvenskan	19	6	2	0	—		21	6
BK Häcken	Total		30	9	3	1	2	0	35	10
CSKA Moscow	2014–15	Russian Premier League	10	3	1	0	0	0	11	3
CSKA Moscow	2015–16	Russian Premier League	1	0	0	0	1 (Note: Appearance(s) in UEFA Champions League)	0	2	0
CSKA Moscow	2016–17	Russian Premier League	8	2	1	0	3	0	12	2
CSKA Moscow	Total		19	5	2	0	4	0	25	5
Ural Yekaterinburg (loan)	2015–16	Russian Premier League	2	0	1	0	—		3	0
AIK (loan)	2016	Allsvenskan	12	7	0	0	3 (Note: Appearances in UEFA Europa League)	2	15	9
Club Brugge	2016–17	Belgian Pro League	0	0	0	0	0	0	0	0
Westerlo (loan)	2016–17	Belgian Pro League	8	1	0	0	—		8	1
Malmö FF	2017	Allsvenskan	9	2	1	0	0	0	10	2
Malmö FF	2018	Allsvenskan	19	7	6	2	6	3	31	12
Malmö FF	2019	Allsvenskan	1	0	3	0	2	0	6	0
Malmö FF	Total		29	9	10	2	8	3	47	14
Örebro SK (loan)	2019	Allsvenskan	18	8	0	0	—		18	8
Al-Hazem	2019–20	Saudi Pro League	27	13	1	1	—		28	14
Al-Hazem	2021–22	Saudi Pro League	14	1	1	0	0	0	15	1
Al-Hazem	Total		41	14	2	1	0	0	43	15
Abha (loan)	2020–21	Saudi Pro League	28	16	1	0	—		29	16
Al-Sailiya	2021–22	Qatar Stars League	9	1	10	9	—		19	10
Al-Sailiya	2022–23	Qatar Stars League	21	11	8	5	0	0	29	16
Al-Sailiya	Total		30	12	18	14	0	0	48	26
Hatayspor	2023–24	Süper Lig	36	8	4	5	—		40	13
Hatayspor	2024–25	Süper Lig	27	4	3	3	—		30	7
Hatayspor	2025–26	TFF 1. Lig	7	0	0	0	—		7	0
Hatayspor	Total		70	12	7	8	—		77	20
Career total			288	93	44	26	17	5	348	124

== Honours ==
Malmö FF

- Allsvenskan: 2017

Al-Sailiya SC

- Qatari Stars Cup: 2021–22

Sweden U17

- FIFA U-17 World Cup third place: 2013

Individual

- Sweden U21 joint-top scorer: 13 goals (shared with Ola Toivonen)
