= Kerim Alıcı =

Turkish footballer

Personal information
- Date of birth: 24 July 1997 (age 29)
- Place of birth: Bornova, Turkey
- Height: 1.83 m (6 ft 0 in)
- Position: Right-back

Team information
- Current team: Mardin 1969
- Number: 27

Youth career
- 2007–2009: Bergama Gençlerbirliğispor
- 2009–2013: Bucaspor
- 2013–2016: Altınordu

Senior career*
Years	Team	Apps	(Gls)
2016–2020	Altınordu	85	(3)
2020–2022	Göztepe	33	(0)
2020–2021	→ Boluspor (loan)	12	(0)
2022–2026	Hatayspor	60	(2)
2023	→ Altınordu (loan)	12	(1)
2026	Bandırmaspor	19	(2)
2026–	Mardin 1969	4	(0)

International career^{‡}
2015	Turkey U18	1	(0)
2017	Turkey U21	1	(0)
- * Club domestic league appearances and goals as of 19 October 2026 ‡ National team caps and goals as of 19:26, 26 May 2021 (UTC)

Kerim Alıcı (born 24 June 1997) is a Turkish professional footballer who plays as a right-back for TFF 1. Lig club Mardin 1969.

== Career ==
Alıcı beg1an his career with Altınordu, and signed a contract with Göztepe on 2 October 2020, and briefly went to Boluspor on loan. Alıcı made his professional debut with Göztepe in a 3-2 Süper Lig win over Konyaspor on 16 January 2021.

== Personal life ==
Alıcı is the twin brother of the footballer Barış Alıcı.
