= Joelson Fernandes =

Portuguese footballer

Personal information
- Full name: Joelson Augusto Mendes Mango Fernandes
- Date of birth: 28 February 2003 (age 23)
- Place of birth: Bissau, Guinea-Bissau
- Height: 1.72 m (5 ft 8 in)
- Position: Winger

Team information
- Current team: Gil Vicente
- Number: 11

Youth career
- –2020: Sporting CP

Senior career*
Years	Team	Apps	(Gls)
2020	Sporting CP	4	(0)
2020–2023	Sporting CP B	23	(2)
2021–2022	→ Basel (loan)	18	(0)
2022	→ Basel II (loan)	2	(0)
2023–2025	Hatayspor	65	(3)
2025–	Gil Vicente	24	(1)

International career^{‡}
2018	Portugal U15	5	(2)
2018–2019	Portugal U16	8	(1)
2019	Portugal U17	3	(1)
2021	Portugal U18	2	(0)
2021–2022	Portugal U19	10	(1)
2022	Portugal U20	2	(0)
2020–2025	Portugal U21	6	(0)
- * Club domestic league appearances and goals as of 25 May 2026 ‡ National team caps and goals as of 00:37, 12 November 2025 (UTC)

Joelson Augusto Mendes Mango Fernandes (born 28 February 2003), or more simply Joelson, is a professional footballer who plays as a winger for Primeira Liga club Gil Vicente. Born in Guinea-Bissau, he represented Portugal's youth teams.

== Club career ==
Joelson's play has led to him being compared to the ex-Madrid star Cristiano Ronaldo. He gathered the attention of several big European clubs such as RB Leipzig, Borussia Dortmund and Arsenal.

Having started training with the first squad after the COVID-19 pandemic, he first figured on the bench of a Liga NOS game on 18 June 2020 against C.D. Tondela.

On 31 August 2021, Joelson completed a move to Basel on a two-year-loan. He joined Basel's first team during their 2021–22 season under head coach Patrick Rahmen. He played his domestic league debut for the club in the away game in the Cornaredo on 12 September as Basel played a 1–1 draw with Lugano. However, on 2 September 2022, the loan was terminated early by mutual agreement. During his loan period with the club, Joelson played a total of 28 games for Basel scoring a total of 2 goals. 18 of these games were in the Swiss Super League, 3 in the Swiss Cup, 2 in the UEFA Europa Conference League and 5 were friendly games. He scored both goals during the test games.

On 11 July 2023, Joelson signed for Turkish club Hatayspor on a free transfer, with Sporting keeping 50% of the player's economic rights.

On 30 August 2025, following two seasons in Turkey, Joelson returned to Portugal, signing a four-year contract with Primeira Liga club Gil Vicente.

== International career ==
Through his double nationality, Joelson is eligible to play for both Portugal and Guinea-Bissau.

He became an under-17 Portugal youth international in November 2019, aged only 16, in a Euro qualifier match against Albania. He made his debut for Portugal U21 in September 2020.

== Personal life ==
Born in Bissau, the capital of Guinea-Bissau, Joelson moved to Portugal in 2014.

Joelson Fernandes' family has very close ties to both football and Sporting Portugal: his father, Mango, was part of the Sporting youth setups, before becoming a footballing agent, and Joelson's younger brother Saná was also part of the Lions academy. His older brother, Ricardo, and cousin Roger Fernandes are also professional footballers.

== Career statistics ==
As of match played 9 November 2025

Appearances and goals by club, season and competition
Club	Season	League			National cup (Note: Includes Taça de Portugal, Turkish Cup)		Continental		Other		Total	
Club	Season	Division	Apps	Goals	Apps	Goals	Apps	Goals	Apps	Goals	Apps	Goals
Sporting CP	2019–20	Primeira Liga	4	0	0	0	0	0	0	0	4	0
Sporting CP B	2020–21	Campeonato de Portugal	9	1	—		—		—		9	1
Sporting CP B	2021–22	Liga 3	2	0	—		—		—		2	0
Sporting CP B	2022–23	Liga 3	12	1	—		—		—		12	1
Sporting CP B	Total		23	2	—		—		—		23	2
Basel (loan)	2021–22	Swiss Super League	18	0	2	0	2 (Note: Appearances in UEFA Europa Conference League)	0	—		22	0
Basel (loan)	2022–23	Swiss Super League	0	0	1	0	0	0	—		1	0
Basel (loan)	Total		18	0	3	0	2	0	—		23	0
Basel II (loan)	2021–22	Swiss Promotion League	2	0	—		—		—		2	0
Hatayspor	2023–24	Süper Lig	31	0	4	0	—		—		35	0
Hatayspor	2024–25	Süper Lig	34	3	2	0	—		—		36	3
Hatayspor	Total		65	3	6	0	—		—		71	3
Gil Vicente	2025–26	Primeira Liga	6	1	1	0	—		—		7	1
Career total			118	6	10	0	2	0	0	0	130	6
