= Ömer Faruk Beyaz =

Turkish footballer (born 2003)

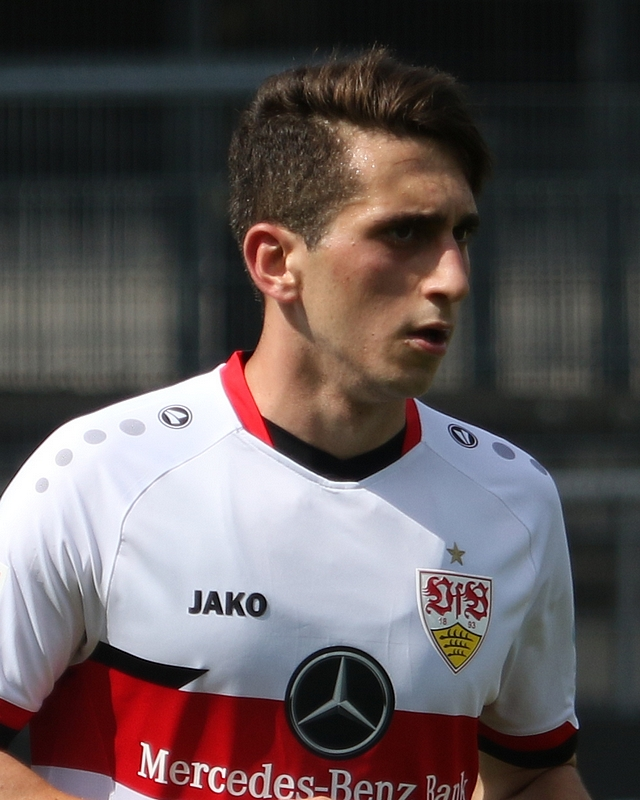
- Beyaz with VfB Stuttgart in 2021

Personal information
- Date of birth: 29 August 2003 (age 23)
- Place of birth: Istanbul, Turkey
- Height: 1.71 m (5 ft 7 in)
- Position: Attacking midfielder

Team information
- Current team: Antalyaspor
- Number: 5

Youth career
- 2013–2020: Fenerbahçe

Senior career*
| Years | Team | Apps | (Gls) |
| 2020–2021 | Fenerbahçe | 5 | (0) |
| 2021–2024 | VfB Stuttgart | 4 | (0) |
| 2022 | → 1. FC Magdeburg (loan) | 3 | (0) |
| 2023–2024 | → Hatayspor (loan) | 27 | (0) |
| 2024–2026 | Başakşehir | 18 | (1) |
| 2026 | Esenler Erokspor | 19 | (1) |
| 2026– | Antalyaspor | 4 | (0) |

International career^{‡}
| 2017–2018 | Turkey U15 | 11 | (4) |
| 2018–2019 | Turkey U16 | 14 | (7) |
| 2019 | Turkey U17 | 10 | (4) |
| 2022 | Turkey U19 | 3 | (0) |
| 2020–2024 | Turkey U21 | 18 | (1) |
- * Club domestic league appearances and goals as of 14 October 2026 ‡ National team caps and goals as of 22:00, 15 October 2024 (UTC)

Ömer Faruk Beyaz (born 29 August 2003) is a Turkish professional footballer who plays as an attacking midfielder for TFF 1. Lig club Antalyaspor.

== Club career ==
On 31 August 2018, Beyaz signed a professional contract with Fenerbahçe. He made his professional debut with Fenerbahçe in a 3–1 Turkish Cup loss to Trabzonspor on 16 June 2020, at the age of 16.

On 14 April 2021, Beyaz signed a professional contract with VfB Stuttgart. On 27 July 2022, he was loaned to 1. FC Magdeburg. The loan was terminated early on 2 January 2023.

On 1 August 2023, Beyaz signed for Süper Lig club Hatayspor on a season-long loan deal with the option to make the move permanent.

On 30 August 2024, the contract between Beyaz and VfB Stuttgart was terminated by mutual consent.

On 4 September 2024, Beyaz returned to Turkey and signed a three-year contract with Başakşehir.

== Career statistics ==
As of match played 3 July 2024

Appearances and goals by club, season and competition
| Club | Season | League | | | National cup | | Continental | | Other | | Total | |
| Club | Season | Division | Apps | Goals | Apps | Goals | Apps | Goals | Apps | Goals | Apps | Goals |
|---|---|---|---|---|---|---|---|---|---|---|---|---|
| Fenerbahçe | 2019–20 | Süper Lig | 4 | 0 | 0 | 0 | 0 | 0 | 0 | 0 | 4 | 0 |
| Fenerbahçe | 2020–21 | Süper Lig | 1 | 0 | 2 | 0 | 0 | 0 | 0 | 0 | 3 | 0 |
| Fenerbahçe | Total | | 5 | 0 | 2 | 0 | 0 | 0 | 0 | 0 | 7 | 0 |
| VfB Stuttgart | 2021–22 | Bundesliga | 4 | 0 | 1 | 0 | — | | — | | 5 | 0 |
| 1. FC Magdeburg (loan) | 2022–23 | 2. Bundesliga | 3 | 0 | 1 | 0 | — | | — | | 4 | 0 |
| Hatayspor (loan) | 2023–24 | Süper Lig | 27 | 0 | 3 | 0 | — | | — | | 30 | 0 |
| Career total | | | 39 | 0 | 7 | 0 | 0 | 0 | 0 | 0 | 46 | 0 |
