= Fisayo Dele-Bashiru =

Nigerian footballer (born 2001)

Personal information
- Full name: Oluwafisayo Faruq Dele-Bashiru
- Date of birth: 6 February 2001 (age 25)
- Place of birth: Lagos State, Nigeria
- Height: 1.76 m (5 ft 9 in)
- Position: Central midfielder

Team information
- Current team: Lazio
- Number: 7

Youth career
- 2009–2020: Manchester City

Senior career*
Years	Team	Apps	(Gls)
2020–2023	Sheffield Wednesday	65	(5)
2023–2025	Hatayspor	36	(8)
2024–2025	→ Lazio (loan)	20	(3)
2025–	Lazio	27	(2)

International career^{‡}
2023–	Nigeria	21	(2)
Medal record
Men's football
Representing Nigeria
Africa Cup of Nations
Third place	2025 Morocco
- * Club domestic league appearances and goals as of 07:04, 19 October 2026 (UTC) ‡ National team caps and goals as of 23:05, 17 November 2026 (UTC)

Oluwafisayo Faruq "Fisayo" Dele-Bashiru (born 6 February 2001) is a Nigerian professional footballer who plays as a central midfielder for Serie A club Lazio and the Nigeria national team.

== Club career ==
After playing for the Manchester City youth team, whom he joined at the age of 8, Dele-Bashiru moved to Sheffield Wednesday in July 2020, signing for an undisclosed fee.

Dele-Bashiru made his senior debut on 5 September 2020, in the EFL Cup, starting the game away to Walsall and would make his first league appearance against Bristol City coming off the bench. In February 2021, he suffered an ankle injury after coming off the bench against Brentford, and it was expected that he would be out-of-action for four-to-six weeks.

Dele-Bashiru broke into the first team again during his second season, and in October 2021 he won the club's Player of the Month award, as well as scoring his first senior goal in a game against Cambridge United.

In September 2022, Dele-Bashiru was nominated for the EFL Cup Player of the Second Round, following a goal and assist against Rochdale, which he subsequently won. Following promotion back to the EFL Championship he was offered a new contract to stay at the club.

On 6 July 2023, it was confirmed Dele-Bashiru had joined Turkish club Hatayspor on a three-year contract. He scored eight goals in his first Süper Lig season, finishing as the club's joint-top scorer along with Carlos Strandberg, including a crucial goal on the final matchday in a 2–0 win over Rizespor, securing his club's survival in the top tier.

On 6 July 2024, Dele-Bashiru joined Italian side Lazio on loan with an obligation to buy. He scored his first goal for the club in the UEFA Europa League on 25 September 2024 in a 3–0 victory over Dynamo Kyiv, and scored his first Serie A goal on 24 November 2024 in the 3–0 victory over Bologna. The clause in his contract was confirmed to be activated (for a figure of €5.4 million) in the club's half-yearly report released in March 2025.

== International career ==
In October 2023, Dele-Bashiru was called up to the Nigeria national team. He scored in his second appearance for Nigeria during their 2026 FIFA World Cup qualifying match against South Africa.

On 11 December 2025, Dele-Bashiru was called up to the Nigeria squad for the 2025 Africa Cup of Nations.

== Personal life ==
His brother Tom Dele-Bashiru is also a footballer.

== Career statistics ==
=== Club ===
As of match played 18 October 2026

Appearances and goals by club, season and competition
Club	Season	League			National cup (Note: Includes FA Cup, Turkish Cup, Coppa Italia)		League cup (Note: Includes EFL Cup)		Europe		Other		Total	
Club	Season	Division	Apps	Goals	Apps	Goals	Apps	Goals	Apps	Goals	Apps	Goals	Apps	Goals
Manchester City U21	2019–20	—			—		—		—		4 (Note: Appearances in EFL Trophy)	0	4	0
Sheffield Wednesday	2020–21	Championship	8	0	2	0	3	0	—		—		13	0
Sheffield Wednesday	2021–22	League One	24	1	2	0	1	0	—		5 (Note: Four appearances in EFL Trophy, one appearance in League One play-offs)	0	32	1
Sheffield Wednesday	2022–23	League One	33	4	4	0	2	1	—		2 (Note: One appearance in EFL Trophy, one appearance in League One play-offs)	0	41	5
Sheffield Wednesday	Total		65	5	8	0	6	1	—		7	0	86	6
Hatayspor	2023–24	Süper Lig	36	8	3	1	—		—		—		39	9
Lazio (loan)	2024–25	Serie A	20	3	1	0	—		8 (Note: Appearances in UEFA Europa League)	2	—		29	5
Lazio	2025–26	Serie A	24	1	4	1	—		—		—		28	2
Lazio	2026–27	Serie A	3	1	1	0	—		—		0	0	4	1
Lazio	Lazio total		47	5	6	1	—		8	2	0	0	61	8
Career total			148	18	17	2	6	1	8	2	11	0	190	23

=== International ===
As of match played 17 November 2026

Appearances and goals by national team and year
National team	Year	Apps	Goals
Nigeria	2023	1	0
Nigeria	2024	5	2
Nigeria	2025	6	0
Nigeria	2026	9	0
Total		21	2

Scores and results list Nigeria's goal tally first, score column indicates score after each Dele-Bashiru goal.

List of international goals scored by Fisayo Dele-Bashiru
No.	Date	Venue	Opponent	Score	Result	Competition
1	7 June 2024	Godswill Akpabio International Stadium, Uyo, Nigeria	South Africa	1–1	1–1	2026 FIFA World Cup qualification
2	11 October 2024	Godswill Akpabio International Stadium, Uyo, Nigeria	Libya	1–0	1–0	2025 Africa Cup of Nations qualification

== Honours ==
Sheffield Wednesday

- EFL League One play-offs: 2023

Lazio

- Coppa Italia runner-up: 2025–26

Nigeria

- Africa Cup of Nations third place: 2025
