= Burak Bekaroğlu =

Turkish footballer

Personal information
- Date of birth: 16 April 1997 (age 29)
- Place of birth: Sakarya, Turkey
- Height: 1.85 m (6 ft 1 in)
- Position: Centre-back

Team information
- Current team: Bandırmaspor
- Number: 86

Youth career
- 2008–2010: Sakarya Tekspor
- 2010–2013: Sakaryaspor

Senior career*
Years	Team	Apps	(Gls)
2013–2019	Sakaryaspor	142	(3)
2019–2021	Boluspor	53	(5)
2021–2022	Fatih Karagümrük	35	(1)
2023–2024	Hatayspor	18	(0)
2024–2026	Iğdır	36	(0)
2026	Sakaryaspor	12	(1)
2026–	Bandırmaspor	6	(0)

International career^{‡}
2014	Turkey U17	5	(0)
2015	Turkey U18	1	(0)
2014–2015	Turkey U19	8	(0)
- * Club domestic league appearances and goals as of 17 October 2026 ‡ National team caps and goals as of 06:33, 28 August 2021 (UTC)

Burak Bekaroğlu (born 16 April 1997) is a Turkish professional footballer who plays as a centre-back for TFF 1. Lig club Bandırmaspor.

== Professional career ==
A youth product of Sakarya Tekspor and Sakaryaspor, Bekaroğlu began his senior career with Sakaryaspor in 2013. In 2019, he transferred to Boluspor in the TFF First League. On 7 July 2021, he signed his first professional contract with Fatih Karagümrük. He made his professional debut with Fatih Karagümrük in a 3–2 Süper Lig win over Gaziantep F.K. on 14 August 2021.
