= Erce Kardeşler =

Turkish footballer (born 1994)

Personal information
- Date of birth: 13 April 1994 (age 32)
- Place of birth: Çanakkale, Turkey
- Height: 1.86 m (6 ft 1 in)
- Position: Goalkeeper

Team information
- Current team: Mardin 1969
- Number: 1

Youth career
- 2005–2008: Bursaspor
- 2008–2009: Çanakkale Dardanelspor
- 2009–2012: Bursaspor

Senior career*
| Years | Team | Apps | (Gls) |
| 2012–2013 | Yeşil Bursa | 2 | (0) |
| 2013–2014 | Altınordu | 0 | (0) |
| 2014 | Aliağa FK | 0 | (0) |
| 2014–2019 | Altınordu | 96 | (0) |
| 2019–2022 | Trabzonspor | 6 | (0) |
| 2022–2025 | Hatayspor | 76 | (0) |
| 2025 | → Amedspor (loan) | 14 | (0) |
| 2025–2026 | Amedspor | 37 | (0) |
| 2026– | Mardin 1969 | 10 | (0) |
- * Club domestic league appearances and goals as of 15 October 2026

Erce Kardeşler (born 14 March 1994) is a Turkish professional footballer who plays for TFF 1. Lig club Mardin 1969..

== Career ==
=== Trabzonspor ===
On 19 July 2019 Kardeşler joined Trabzonspor from Altınordu im return of a TRY2.5 million transfer fee, during 2019 summer transfer window.

He played in starting line up of Trabzonspor up against FC Krasnodar at Group C encounter of 2019–20 UEFA Europa League that ended 3–1 in favour of Russian outfit, held at Krasnodar Stadium, Krasnodar, on 7 November 2019.

=== Hatayspor ===
He joined Hatayspor for transfer fee of 400.000 Euro in July 2022. He signed a four-year contract with the club.

== Personal life ==
Kardeşler is son of former Bursaspor goalkeeper and current coach Eser Kardeşler. Arda Kardeşler, older brother of Erce, is a football referee arbitrating at Süper Lig level, under Turkish Football Federation license.

== Career statistics ==
As of match played 26 May 2024

Appearances and goals by club, season and competition
| Club | Season | League | | | National Cup | | Europe | | Other | | Total | |
| Club | Season | Division | Apps | Goals | Apps | Goals | Apps | Goals | Apps | Goals | Apps | Goals |
|---|---|---|---|---|---|---|---|---|---|---|---|---|
| Yeşil Bursa | 2012–13 | TFF Third League | 2 | 0 | 0 | 0 | — | | — | | 2 | 0 |
| Altınordu | 2013–14 | TFF Second League | 0 | 0 | 1 | 0 | — | | — | | 1 | 0 |
| Altınordu | 2014–15 | TFF First League | 0 | 0 | 1 | 0 | — | | — | | 1 | 0 |
| Altınordu | 2015–16 | TFF First League | 3 | 0 | 0 | 0 | — | | — | | 3 | 0 |
| Altınordu | 2016–17 | TFF First League | 31 | 0 | 0 | 0 | — | | — | | 31 | 0 |
| Altınordu | 2017–18 | TFF First League | 28 | 0 | 0 | 0 | — | | — | | 28 | 0 |
| Altınordu | 2018–19 | TFF First League | 34 | 0 | 0 | 0 | — | | — | | 34 | 0 |
| Altınordu | Total | | 96 | 0 | 2 | 0 | — | | — | | 98 | 0 |
| Trabzonspor | 2019–20 | Süper Lig | 3 | 0 | 5 | 0 | 3 | 0 | — | | 11 | 0 |
| Trabzonspor | 2020–21 | Süper Lig | 1 | 0 | 1 | 0 | — | | 0 | 0 | 2 | 0 |
| Trabzonspor | 2021–22 | Süper Lig | 2 | 0 | 2 | 0 | 0 | 0 | — | | 4 | 0 |
| Trabzonspor | Total | | 6 | 0 | 8 | 0 | 3 | 0 | 0 | 0 | 17 | 0 |
| Hatayspor | 2022–23 | Süper Lig | 21 | 0 | 0 | 0 | — | | — | | 21 | 0 |
| Hatayspor | 2023–24 | Süper Lig | 35 | 0 | 0 | 0 | — | | — | | 35 | 0 |
| Hatayspor | Total | | 56 | 0 | 0 | 0 | — | | — | | 56 | 0 |
| Career total | | | 160 | 0 | 10 | 0 | 0 | 0 | 0 | 0 | 170 | 0 |

== Honours ==
Trabzonspor

- Turkish Cup (1): 2019–20
- Turkish Super Cup (1): 2020
- Süper Lig (1): 2021–22
