= Ilter Ayyildiz =

Austrian footballer (born 1992)

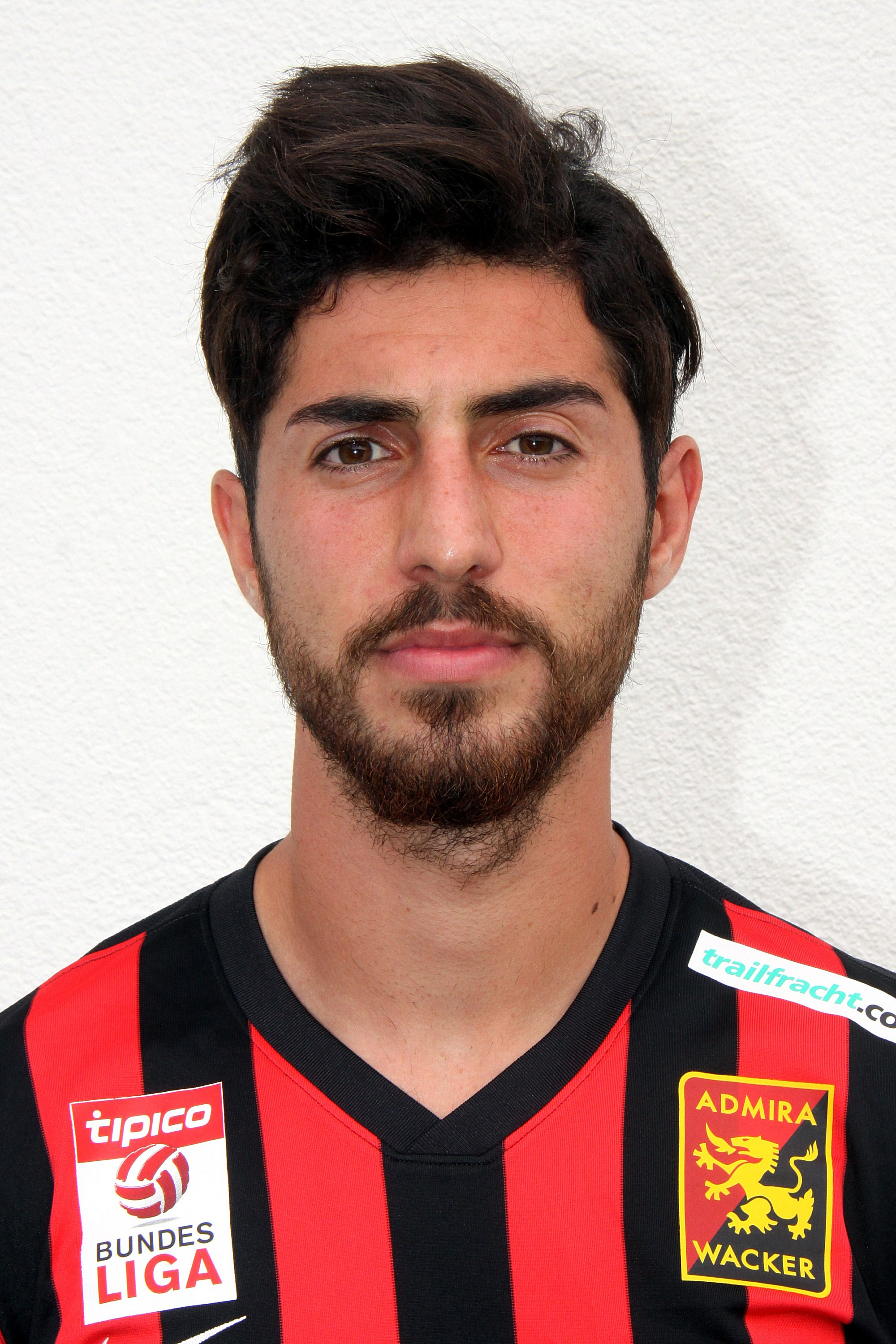
- Ayyildiz for Admira Wacker in 2015

Personal information
- Date of birth: 31 July 1992 (age 34)
- Place of birth: Vienna, Austria
- Height: 1.78 m (5 ft 10 in)
- Position: Midfielder

Team information
- Current team: Düzcespor
- Number: 72

Youth career
- 2000–2002: Union Mauer
- 2002–2009: Admira Wacker
- 2009–2010: Schwechat

Senior career*
Years	Team	Apps	(Gls)
2010–2013	Schwechat	53	(6)
2013–2017	Admira Wacker II	33	(6)
2014–2017	Admira Wacker	12	(1)
2014–2015	→ Horn (loan)	33	(2)
2017	Amed	10	(0)
2018	Nazilli Belediyespor	16	(2)
2018–2019	Kırklarelispor	31	(9)
2019–2020	Sarıyer	23	(3)
2020–2021	Vanspor	1	(0)
2021	Bayburt ÖİS	7	(1)
2021–2022	Horn	12	(0)
2022–2023	Batman Petrolspor	20	(1)
2023–	Düzcespor	0	(0)
- * Club domestic league appearances and goals as of 23 September 2023

Ilter Ayyildiz (Turkish: İlter Ayyıldız, born 31 July 1992) is an Austrian professional footballer who plays as a left winger for Turkish club Düzcespor.

== Career ==
On 26 August 2019, Ayyildiz joined Sarıyer in the TFF Second League.

On 29 July 2021, he returned to Horn.

== Personal life ==
Ayyildiz is of Turkish descent.
