= Engin Can Aksoy =

Turkish footballer (born 2003)

Personal information
- Date of birth: 14 November 2003 (age 22)
- Place of birth: Bakırköy, Turkey
- Height: 1.85 m (6 ft 1 in)
- Position: Left-back

Team information
- Current team: Hatayspor
- Number: 17

Youth career
- 2015–2017: Bağcılar Eğitimspor
- 2017–2018: Bağcılar İstoçspor
- 2018–2019: Bağcılar SK
- 2019–2022: Hatayspor

Senior career*
Years	Team	Apps	(Gls)
2022–	Hatayspor	32	(1)
2023	→ Eyüpspor (loan)	0	(0)
2024–2025	→ Sakaryaspor (loan)	13	(0)

International career^{‡}
2023	Turkey U21	1	(0)
- * Club domestic league appearances and goals as of 1 October 2026 ‡ National team caps and goals as of 7 January 2024

Engin Can Aksoy (born 14 November 2003) is a Turkish professional footballer who plays as a left-back for Hatayspor.

== Professional career ==
Aksoy is a youth product of Bağcılar Eğitimspor, Bağcılar İstoçspor, Bağcılar SK and Hatayspor. He made his professional debut with Hatayspor in a 4–1 Süper Lig win over Giresunspor on 22 May 2022. In the summer of 2022, he was promoted to Hatayspor's senior team. On 23 February 2023, he joined Eyüpspor in the TFF First League after Hatayspor withdrew from the league following the 2023 Turkey–Syria earthquake.
