= Oğuzhan Matur =

German footballer

Personal information
- Date of birth: 19 August 1999 (age 27)
- Place of birth: Berlin, Germany
- Height: 1.73 m (5 ft 8 in)
- Position: Left-back

Team information
- Current team: Muğlaspor
- Number: 5

Youth career
- Viktoria Berlin

Senior career*
| Years | Team | Apps | (Gls) |
| 2018 | Viktoria Berlin | 3 | (0) |
| 2018–2020 | Optik Rathenow | 23 | (0) |
| 2020–2021 | Tennis Borussia | 0 | (0) |
| 2021–2023 | Zonguldak Kömürspor | 55 | (0) |
| 2023–2026 | Hatayspor | 21 | (1) |
| 2025 | → Adanaspor (loan) | 10 | (0) |
| 2026 | Amedspor | 3 | (0) |
| 2026– | Muğlaspor | 8 | (0) |
- * Club domestic league appearances and goals as of 7 November 2026

Oğuzhan Matur (born 17 August 1999) is a German professional footballer who plays as a left-back for Turkish TFF 1. Lig club Muğlaspor.

== Career ==
Matur began his senior career with his local club Viktoria Berlin, and shortly after moved to Optik Rathenow on 12 July 2018. On 13 July 2020, he transferred to Tennis Borussia for a season. On 24 August 2021, he moved to the TFF Second League in Turkey with Zonguldak Kömürspor on a 2-year contract. On 26 June 2023, he transferred to the Süper Lig club on a 3-year contract.

== Personal life ==
Born in Berlin, Germany, Matur is of Turkish descent. He lost 31 relatives during the 2023 Turkey–Syria earthquakes, and made public statements thanking the miners who were digging out survivors.
