= Chandrel Massanga =

Congolese footballer

Personal information
- Full name: Chandrel Géraud Massanga Matondo
- Date of birth: 17 August 1999 (age 27)
- Place of birth: Pointe-Noire, Congo
- Height: 1.72 m (5 ft 8 in)
- Position: Midfielder

Team information
- Current team: Eyüpspor
- Number: 88

Senior career*
Years	Team	Apps	(Gls)
2017–2018	CS La Mancha		
2018–2020	CARA Brazzaville		
2020–2022	Otohô		
2022–2023	Partizani	42	(1)
2023–2026	Hatayspor	58	(4)
2026–	Eyüpspor	8	(0)

International career^{‡}
2019–	Congo	14	(1)
- * Club domestic league appearances and goals as of 17 October 2026 ‡ National team caps and goals as of 24 September 2026

Chandrel Géraud Massanga Matondo (born 17 August 1999) is a Congolese professional footballer who plays as a midfielder for Süper Lig club Eyüpspor in Turkey and the Congo national team.

== Career ==
Massanga began his senior career in the Congo, with the clubs CS La Mancha, CARA Brazzaville, and Otohô with whom he won the Congo Premier League in 2021. In January 2022, Massanga transferred to the Albanian club Partizani on a contract until June 2024. He helped them win the 2022–23 Kategoria Superiore in his second season there. On 2 September 2023 he transferred to the Turkish Süper Lig club Hatayspor on a 4-year contract on 31 August 2023.

== International career ==
Massanga was part of the Congo national team for the 2020 African Nations Championship.

== Honours ==
Otohô

- Congo Premier League: 2020–2021

Partizani

- Kategoria Superiore: 2022–23
