= Cengiz Demir =

Turkish football player

Personal information
- Full name: Cengiz Demir
- Date of birth: 18 April 2001 (age 25)
- Place of birth: Gaziantep, Turkey
- Height: 1.86 m (6 ft 1 in)
- Position: Defender

Team information
- Current team: Fethiyespor
- Number: 4

Youth career
- 2013: Meydan Gençlikspor
- 2013–2020: Antalyaspor

Senior career*
Years	Team	Apps	(Gls)
2020–2022	Antalyaspor	0	(0)
2020–2021	→ Bodrumspor (loan)	9	(0)
2021–2022	→ Akhisarspor (loan)	16	(0)
2022–2026	Hatayspor	26	(0)
2022–2023	→ Kırklarelispor (loan)	11	(0)
2023	→ Uşakspor (loan)	2	(0)
2026	Serikspor	11	(1)
2026–	Fethiyespor	9	(0)
- * Club domestic league appearances and goals as of 14 November 2026

Cengiz Demir (born 18 April 2001) is a Turkish footballer who plays as a defender for TFF 2. Lig club Fethiyespor. His primary position is centre-back, and he sometimes plays left-back.

== Career ==
Demir made his professional debut with Antalyaspor in a 4-3 Turkish Cup win over Göztepe S.K. on 16 January 2020.

On 13 November 2025, Demir was banned from playing for 45 days for his involvement in the 2025 Turkish football betting scandal.
