= Guy Kilama =

Cameroonian footballer

Personal information
- Full name: Guy-Marcelin Kilama Kilama
- Date of birth: 30 May 1999 (age 27)
- Place of birth: Douala, Cameroon
- Height: 1.80 m (5 ft 11 in)
- Positions: Defender; midfielder

Team information
- Current team: Ordabasy
- Number: 3

Youth career
- 2014–2018: EFBC
- 2018: Niort

Senior career*
Years	Team	Apps	(Gls)
2018–	Niort II	15	(0)
2018–2023	Niort	98	(1)
2023–2025	Hatayspor	77	(4)
2026–	Ordabasy	25	(2)

International career^{‡}
2019	Cameroon U23	1	(0)
2024–	Cameroon	5	(0)
- * Club domestic league appearances and goals as of 13:21, 31 October 2026 (UTC) ‡ National team caps and goals as of 9 June 2025

Guy-Marcelin Kilama Kilama (born 30 May 1999) is a Cameroonian professional footballer who plays as a defender for Kazakhstan Premier League club Ordabasy and the Cameroon national team.

== Professional career ==
On 30 January 2018, Kilama joined Chamois Niortais F.C. from EFBC from Cameroon, and can play in midfield and defense. He made his professional debut for Niort in a 4–2 Ligue 2 win over Clermont Foot on 2 August 2018, playing as a leftback.

On 4 August 2023, he signed a three-year contract with Süper Lig club Hatayspor.

== International career ==
Kilama represented the Cameroon U23s at the 2019 Africa U-23 Cup of Nations.

== Career statistics ==
=== Club ===
As of matches played 7 November 2026

Appearances and goals by club, season and competition
Club	Season	League			National cup (Note: Includes Coupe de France, Turkish Cup, Kazakhstan Cup)		League cup (Note: Includes Coupe de la Ligue)		Other		Total	
Club	Season	Division	Apps	Goals	Apps	Goals	Apps	Goals	Apps	Goals	Apps	Goals
Chamois Niortais II	2017–18	National 3	3	0	—		—		—		3	0
Chamois Niortais II	2018–19	National 3	7	0	—		—		—		7	0
Chamois Niortais II	2019–20	National 3	5	0	—		—		—		5	0
Chamois Niortais II	2021–22	National 3	1	0	—		—		—		1	0
Chamois Niortais II	Total		16	0	—		—		—		16	0
Chamois Niortais	2018–19	Ligue 2	2	0	0	0	0	0	—		2	0
Chamois Niortais	2019–20	Ligue 2	14	1	0	0	1	0	—		15	1
Chamois Niortais	2020–21	Ligue 2	31	0	1	0	— (Note: The Coupe de la Ligue was indefinitely suspended following the 2019–20 edition)		2 (Note: Appearances in Ligue 2 relegation play-offs)	0	34	0
Chamois Niortais	2021–22	Ligue 2	19	0	— (Note: Niort excluded from the 2021–22 Coupe de France)		—		—		19	0
Chamois Niortais	2022–23	Ligue 2	32	0	2	0	—		—		34	0
Chamois Niortais	Total		98	1	3	0	—		2	0	103	1
Hatayspor	2023–24	Süper Lig	35	2	2	0	—		—		37	2
Hatayspor	2024–25	Süper Lig	31	1	1	0	—		—		32	1
Hatayspor	2025–26	TFF 1. Lig	11	1	0	0	—		—		11	1
Hatayspor	Total		77	4	3	0	—		—		80	4
Ordabasy	2026	Kazakhstan Premier League	25	2	3	1	—		—		28	3
Career total			216	7	9	1	1	0	2	0	228	8

=== International ===
As of match played 9 June 2025

Appearances and goals by national team and year
National team	Year	Apps	Goals
Cameroon	2024	3	0
Cameroon	2025	2	0
Total		5	0

== Honours ==
Ordabasy

- Kazakhstan Premier League: 2026
- Kazakhstan Cup: 2026
