= Mersin Stadium =

Multi-purpose stadium in Mersin, Turkey

Coordinates: 36°49′14″N 34°32′19″E

Mersin Stadyumu
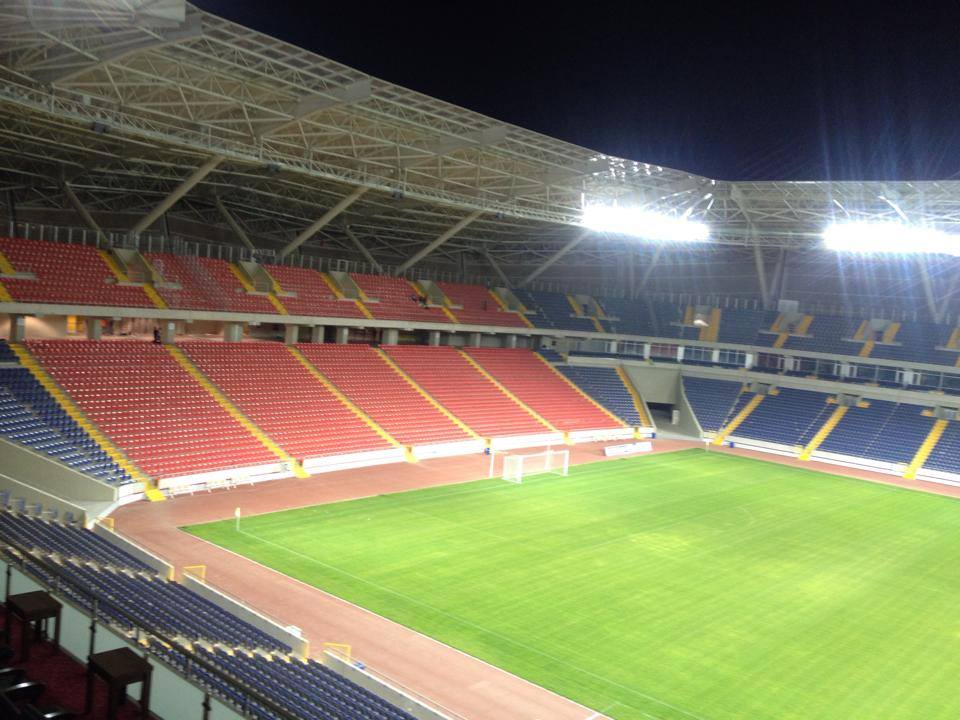
- Interactive map of Mersin Stadyumu
- Former names: Mersin Olympic Stadium
- Location: Yenişehir, Mersin, Turkey
- Capacity: 25,497
- Executive suites: 24

Construction
- Groundbreaking: 1 February 2012
- Opened: 20 June 2013 (Mediterranean Games); 23 March 2014 (Mersin Idman Yurdu)
- Cost: 100 Million Euro

Tenants
- 2013 Mediterranean Games; Mersin İdman Yurdu (2014–2019); Yeni Mersin İdmanyurdu (2019–); Hatayspor (2023–2025)

The Mersin Stadium, is a multi-purpose stadium in Mersin, Turkey. Completed in 2013, it was the new home ground for Mersin İdman Yurdu, replacing the old Tevfik Sırrı Gür Stadium. It hosted the opening and closing ceremonies for the 2013 Mediterranean Games. The all-seater stadium has the capacity to host 25,534 spectators during football games.

== Facts ==
=== Capacity ===
- Normal seats: 20,667
- VIP seats: 3,773
- Protocol: 180
- Suites: 914
- TOTAL: 25,534

=== Construction ===
- Total concrete used during stadium construction: 55,000 m^{2}
- Suit area: 4,812 m^{2}
- Stairways: 34
- Lifts: 17
- Car Parking: 1,295
- Bus Parking 46
