= Görkem Sağlam =

German footballer

Personal information
- Date of birth: 11 April 1998 (age 28)
- Place of birth: Gelsenkirchen, Germany
- Height: 1.78 m (5 ft 10 in)
- Position: Attacking midfielder

Team information
- Current team: Kayserispor
- Number: 61

Youth career
- –2006: SG Wattenscheid 09
- 2006–2017: VfL Bochum

Senior career*
Years	Team	Apps	(Gls)
2015–2020	VfL Bochum	29	(1)
2020–2022	Willem II	46	(3)
2022–2023	Giresunspor	26	(1)
2023–26	Hatayspor	76	(9)
2026-	Kayserispor	11	(0)

International career
2012–2013	Germany U15	7	(2)
2013	Germany U16	3	(0)
2014–2015	Germany U17	17	(4)
2016	Germany U18	3	(0)
2017	Germany U19	3	(0)
2017–2018	Germany U20	7	(2)
Medal record
Men's football
Representing Germany
UEFA European Under-17 Championship
Runner-up	2015 Bulgaria
- * Club domestic league appearances and goals as of 10 June 2026

Görkem Sağlam (born 11 April 1998) is a professional footballer who plays as an attacking midfielder for TFF 1. Lig side Kayserispor. Born in Germany, he has opted to play for Turkey internationally.

== International career ==
Born in Germany, Sağlam is of Turkish descent. He was a youth international for Germany, having played up to the Germany U20s. In November 2020, he was called up to the Turkey U21s for 2021 UEFA European Under-21 Championship qualification matches.

== Career statistics ==
As of 1 January 2020

Appearances and goals by club, season and competition
Club	Season	League			Cup		Total	
Club	Season	Division	Apps	Goals	Apps	Goals	Apps	Goals
VfL Bochum	2014–15	2. Bundesliga	0	0	0	0	0	0
VfL Bochum	2015–16	2. Bundesliga	1	0	0	0	1	0
VfL Bochum	2016–17	2. Bundesliga	14	1	0	0	14	1
VfL Bochum	2017–18	2. Bundesliga	4	0	1	1	5	1
VfL Bochum	2018–19	2. Bundesliga	10	0	0	0	0	0
VfL Bochum	2019–20	2. Bundesliga	0	0	0	0	0	0
VfL Bochum	Total		29	1	1	1	30	2
Willem II Tilburg	2019–20	Eredivisie	0	0	0	0	0	0
Career total			29	1	1	1	30	2
