= Recep Burak Yılmaz =

Turkish footballer

Personal information
- Date of birth: 27 November 1995 (age 30)
- Place of birth: Üsküdar, Turkey
- Height: 1.85 m (6 ft 1 in)
- Position: Centre-back

Team information
- Current team: Hatayspor
- Number: 15

Youth career
- 2005–2008: Fenerbahçe
- 2008–2013: Kartalspor
- 2013–2015: Galatasaray

Senior career*
Years	Team	Apps	(Gls)
2015–2016	Galatasaray	0	(0)
2015–2016	→Kartalspor (loan)	12	(0)
2016–2017	Kartalspor	33	(3)
2017–2020	Sancaktepe	74	(4)
2020–2022	Samsunspor	15	(0)
2020–2021	→ Manisa (loan)	34	(2)
2022–	Hatayspor	71	(1)
- * Club domestic league appearances and goals as of 1 October 2026

Recep Burak Yılmaz (born 27 November 1995), is a Turkish professional footballer who plays as a centre-back for Hatayspor.

== Professional career ==
Yılmaz is a youth product of Fenerbahçe, Kartalspor and Galatasaray. He signed his first professional contract with Galatasaray in 2014, and the following season moved on loan with Kartalspor where he began his senior career. He signed permanently with Kartalspor for the 2016–2017 season. The following year, he moved to Sancaktepe where he was the starter for 3 seasons. He moved to Samsunspor in the TFF Second League in 2020, and helped them win the league in his first season with them. The following season, he joined Manisa on loan where he again won the TFF Second League before returning to Samsunspor. He was a starter for Samsunspor in the TFF First League upon his return, but early in the season had a season-ending toe surgery. On 16 June 2022, he transferred to Hatayspor signing a 3-year contract. He made his professional debut with Hatayspor in a 1–0 Süper Lig loss to Kasımpaşa on 28 August 2022.

== Honours ==
Samsunspor

- TFF Second League: 2019–20

Manisa

- TFF Second League: 2020–21
