= Hatayspor =

Turkish football club in Antakya

- Full name: Hatayspor Kulübü
- Nickname: Güneyin Yıldızı (Star of the South)
- Founded: 23 July 1967; 59 years ago
- Stadium: Sarıseki Fuat Tosyalı Sports Complex (temporary venue)
- Capacity: 9,800
- Coordinates: 36°40′35″N 36°13′05″E
- President: Ethem Çakır
- Head coach: Akan Karasu
- League: TFF 2. Lig
- 2025–26: TFF 1. Lig, 19th of 20 (relegated)
- Website: hatayspor.org.tr
Home colours	Away colours	Third colours

Hatayspor Kulübü, known as Atakaş Hatayspor due to sponsorship reasons, is a Turkish professional football club located in Antakya, Hatay Province. Hatayspor, founded in 1967 through a merger of three local clubs, aimed to promote sports and positive habits among youth. The team's colors symbolize nobility, purity, and peace. They won their first championship in 1969–70, earning promotion. Over the years, they faced relegations and promotions in lower leagues. They reached the Second League in 1989–90 and 1993, and finally promoted to the Süper Lig in the 2019–20 season.

Having played at the 25,000-capacity New Hatay Stadium until 2023, the team currently plays their home matches at the Fuat Tosyalı Stadium in İskenderun because of the extensive damage 2023 Turkey–Syria earthquakes caused in Antakya.

In addition to its men's football team, which competes in the 1. Lig, the club also has a women's football team that competes in the Turkish Women's Football Super League.

== History ==
Hatayspor was founded in 1967 through the merger of Kurtuluşspor, Esnafspor, and Reyhanlı Gençlikspor by the prominent figures of the city. The aim was to attract public interest through competitions and to help young individuals steer clear of negative habits. The team's colors are Maroon-White, with an additional third color, Laurel Leaf Green. Maroon symbolizes nobility, White represents purity, and Laurel Leaf Green signifies peace. The inaugural founding members of Hatayspor were Razık Gazel (President), Orhan Aksuyu (Vice President), Fatih Hocaoğlu (Team Captain), and Hüsnü Hataylı.

Hatayspor secured its first championship during the 1969–70 season under the guidance of coach İlker Tolon, earning promotion from the Third League to the Second League. Subsequently, in the 1975–76 season, the team was relegated to the Third League, but managed to reclaim a spot in the Second League by finishing as runners-up in the 1979–80 season. However, this stay in the Second League was short-lived as the team was relegated again in the 1982–83 season. Due to the elimination of the Third League, Hatayspor competed in the amateur divisions for a single year. In 1984, when the Third League were reinstated, the team was placed in the Third League. In the 1989–90 season, Hatayspor clinched the championship in their Third League group and gained promotion to the Second League . However, they faced relegation once more during the 1991–92 season. Remarkably, just a year after the relegation in the 1992–93 season, Hatayspor achieved another triumph by winning their Third League group and advancing to the Second League. During the 2007–08 season, Hatayspor experienced another relegation to the Third League. In the 2008–09 season, Hatayspor led the Third League Classification group and finished 6th in the Third League Promotion group, earning a spot in the Third League play-offs. Their first opponent was Ankara Demirspor. After a 1–1 draw in regular time and extra time, Hatayspor won 5–2 on aggregate, securing a place in the final against Yalovaspor. Despite taking a 1–0 lead in the final, they were defeated 2–1 and were eliminated. In the 2011–12 season, under the management of İsmail Batur, Hatayspor became champions of their Third League group with a week left to go and earned promotion to the Second League.

During the 2012–13 season, competing in the Second League Red Group, Hatayspor finished 2nd and qualified for the play-offs. Unfortunately, they lost the final match against Fethiyespor, narrowly missing the chance to reach the First League. They faced the same misfortune in the 2013–14 season, losing the final match to Alanyaspor in a penalty shootout, once again failing to secure promotion to the First League. In the 2017–18 season, under the management of İlhan Palut, Hatayspor became champions of the Second League and earned promotion to the First League after 16 years. In the 2018–19 season, now known as the First League, Hatayspor finished in 3rd place. They also made a mark in the Turkish Cup, defeating the First League Lig leader Gençlerbirliği 4–1 in the Round of 16, and further impressing by beating Süper Lig leader İstanbul Başakşehir with a solid 4–1 score at home in the Quarter-finals. However, in the Quarter-finals, despite an impressive performance that saw them score 4 goals to turn around a 2–0 deficit in the second leg against Galatasaray, they were eliminated due to an away goal rule after the aggregate score ended 4–4. In the Play-Offs to qualify for the Süper Lig, Hatayspor eliminated Adana Demirspor in the Semi-finals but lost to Gaziantep in the final on penalties, falling short of promotion to the Süper Lig.

In the 2019–20 season, Hatayspor clinched the championship with one week remaining and, for the first time in its 53-year history, achieved promotion to the Süper Lig. During the 2020–21 season, the team made its debut in the Süper Lig and had a successful season, maintaining a chance to qualify for the inaugural UEFA Europa Conference League until the final weeks. However, despite their efforts, they couldn't secure the opportunity, finishing the season in 6th place. In the 2020–21 season, Hatayspor's forward players excelled, with Aaron Boupendza scoring 22 goals to claim the top scorer title. Additionally, Mame Biram Diouf finished in second place with 19 goals in the top scorer rankings. In January 2022, the club launched a partnership with Philippines Football League club Dynamic Herb Cebu.

During the first of the 2023 Turkey–Syria earthquakes, the club's quarters in Antakya collapsed, trapping players and staff. All were rescued except player Christian Atsu who died, and sporting director Taner Savut, whose body was found on 21 February 2023. Following the earthquake, the club withdrew from the league. Due to the circumstances of their withdrawal, they were allowed to reenter into the league for the 2023-24 season. Relegated to the 1st League in the 2024-25 season

== Rivalries ==
The team which Hatayspor most played against is Tarsus İdman Yurdu. So far, there have been 43 games between the teams. Hatayspor won 17 of 43, Tarsus Idman Yurdu won 15 of 43, and 11 games ended with draw.

== Statistics ==
=== League participations ===
- Süper Lig: 2020–2025,
- TFF First League: 1970–76, 1980–83, 1990–92, 1993–2002, 2018–2020, 2025–2026
- TFF Second League: 1967–70, 1976–80, 1984–90, 1992–93, 2002–08, 2012–18, 2026-
- TFF Third League: 2008–12
- Amateur League: 1983–84

=== League performances ===
Season	League	Pos	Pld	W	D	L	GF	GA	Pts	Turkish Cup
1967–68	2. Lig	8	32	12	10	10	39	35	34	—
1968–69	2. Lig	6	26	10	9	7	28	26	29	—
1969–70	2. Lig	1	40	25	11	4	70	19	61	—
1970–71	1. Lig	10	30	10	8	12	23	33	28	—
1971–72	1. Lig	13	30	10	8	12	24	30	28	—
1972–73	1. Lig	14	30	8	11	11	19	23	27	—
1973–74	1. Lig	4	30	11	11	8	26	21	33	—
1974–75	1. Lig	12	30	10	7	13	22	32	27	—
1975–76	1. Lig	16	30	11	4	15	24	46	26	—
1976–77	2. Lig	6	18	6	6	6	14	13	18	—
1977–78	2. Lig	5	24	9	8	7	22	23	26	—
1978–79	2. Lig	4	20	9	2	9	23	17	20	—
1979–80	2. Lig	2	28	11	10	7	29	29	32	—
1980–81	1. Lig	5	30	13	5	12	38	32	31	—
1981–82	1. Lig	8	28	7	12	9	24	29	26	—
1982–83	1. Lig	12	30	8	11	11	26	31	27	—
During the 1983–84 season, Hatayspor competed at the amateur level.
1984–85	2. Lig	2	18	12	2	4	28	7	26	—
1985–86	2. Lig	3	24	13	6	5	40	19	32	—
1986–87	2. Lig	4	32	11	17	4	31	21	39	—
1987–88	2. Lig	2	32	23	6	3	76	15	75	—
1988–89	2. Lig	3	30	16	9	5	67	29	57	—
1989–90	2. Lig	1	32	24	4	4	67	20	76	—
1990–91	1. Lig	10	32	10	10	12	39	48	40	—
1991–92	1. Lig	15	32	11	6	15	31	38	39	—
1992–93	2. Lig	1	30	20	7	3	68	25	67	—
1993–94	1. Lig	5	32	16	6	10	57	32	54	—
1994–95	1. Lig	9	32	8	10	14	35	46	34	—
1995–96	1. Lig	5	32	11	7	14	40	51	40	—
1996–97	1. Lig	6	32	11	8	13	50	48	41	—
1997–98	1. Lig	6	32	12	6	14	35	38	42	—
1998–99	1. Lig	3	32	11	7	14	35	46	42	—
1999–00	1. Lig	3	36	12	12	12	53	42	48	—
2000–01	1. Lig	10	36	14	5	17	47	72	39	—
2001–02	1. Lig	16	38	12	9	17	43	43	45	—
2002–03	2. Lig	2	32	23	6	3	76	30	75	—
2003–04	2. Lig	3	32	17	7	8	64	42	58	—
2004–05	2. Lig	6	32	14	5	13	32	35	47	—
2005–06	2. Lig	7	50	23	11	16	79	66	80	—
2006–07	2. Lig	3	50	16	22	12	46	40	70	—
2007–08	2. Lig	8	50	5	18	27	42	73	34	—
2008–09	3. Lig	6	36	22	10	4	49	29	72	—
2009–10	3. Lig	3	44	18	12	14	55	57	66	—
2010–11	3. Lig	8	34	15	8	11	46	27	53	—
2011–12	3. Lig	1	36	22	6	8	55	29	72	—
2012–13	2. Lig	2	32	14	13	5	46	26	55	—
2013–14	2. Lig	3	34	18	9	7	50	30	63	—
2014–15	2. Lig	3	34	17	9	8	46	32	60	—
2015–16	2. Lig	13	34	8	11	15	31	39	35	—
2016–17	2. Lig	4	34	22	11	7	39	25	59	—
2017–18	2. Lig	1	34	23	7	4	63	15	76	—
2018–19	1. Lig	3	34	19	10	5	57	22	67	—
2019–20	1. Lig	1	34	19	9	6	48	28	66	—
2020–21	Süper Lig	6	40	17	10	13	62	53	61	—
2021–22	Süper Lig	12	38	15	8	15	56	60	53	—
2022–23	Süper Lig	'19	36	6	5	25	19	83	23	—
2023–24	Süper Lig	15	38	9	14	15	45	52	41	—
2024–25	Süper Lig	18	36	6	8	22	47	74	26	—
2025–26	1. Lig	19	38	2	8	28	33	102	14	—

== Players ==
=== Current squad ===
As of 17 November 2026

Note: Flags indicate national team as defined under FIFA eligibility rules; some limited exceptions apply. Players may hold more than one non-FIFA nationality.

No.	Pos.	Nation	Player
1	GK	TUR	Mert Çiçek
4	DF	NED	Sinan Özen
5	DF	TUR	Melih Şen
6	MF	TUR	Halil Cen Cemali
8	MF	TUR	Birhan Vatansever
9	FW	TUR	Taylan Özgün
10	FW	TUR	Ensar Arslan
11	MF	TUR	İbrahim Efe Sucuoğlu
15	DF	TUR	Burak Yılmaz (captain)
16	DF	TUR	Abdulkadir Adıyaman
17	DF	TUR	Engin Can Aksoy
19	MF	TUR	Ali Eren Tan
20	MF	TUR	Ali Yıldız

No.	Pos.	Nation	Player
23	MF	TUR	Cemil Berk Aksu
21	DF	TUR	Seyit Gazanfer
24	DF	TUR	Ahmet Bayam
25	MF	TUR	Mustafa Said Aydın
31	MF	TUR	Mustafa Çınar Baytar
33	DF	TUR	Ersin Aydemir
34	GK	TUR	Demir Sarıcalı
55	DF	TUR	Alperen Alaca
65	FW	TUR	Volkan Alkan
72	MF	TUR	Bilal Toğ
77	DF	TUR	Barış Uzel
83	DF	TUR	Atakan Özenir
98	GK	TUR	Sedat Keleş

== Coaching staff ==
Position	Name
Head coach	(Turkey) Bekir İrtegün
Assistant coach	(Turkey) Gökhan Alaş (Turkey) Hayati Köse (Turkey) Serkan Demir
Goalkeeper coach	(Turkey) Levent Açıl
Athletic coach	(Turkey) Serkan Salman (Turkey) Şirin Yılmaz
Chief Analyst	(Turkey) Ulaşcan Çakır

== Affiliated clubs ==
The following club is currently affiliated with Hatayspor:

- (Philippines) Dynamic Herb Cebu (2022–present)
