= 2022–23 Hatayspor season =

Hatayspor
2022–23 season
- President: Nihat Tazeaslan
- Head coach: Volkan Demirel
- Stadium: New Hatay Stadium
- Süper Lig: 19th (withdrew)
- Turkish Cup: Third round
- Top goalscorer: League: Ayoub El Kaabi (8); All: Ayoub El Kaabi (8)
- Highest home attendance: 18,628 (vs. Beşiktaş, 24 October 2022, Süper Lig)
- Lowest home attendance: 3,233 (vs. Giresunspor, 24 December 2022, Süper Lig)
Home colours	Away colours	Third colours

The 2022–23 season was the 55th season in the existence of Hatayspor and the club's third consecutive season in the top flight of Turkish football. In addition to the domestic league, Hatayspor participated in this season's edition of the Turkish Cup. The season covers the period from 1 July 2022 to 30 June 2023.

== Season overview ==
=== Turkey–Syria earthquake and aftermath ===
On 12 February 2023, Turkish Football Federation announced Hatayspor's withdrawal from the league due to the 2023 Turkey–Syria earthquake, which widely hit the club's home city.

On 18 February, having been missing since the quake, first-team player Christian Atsu's body was found and he was later pronounced dead. Three days later, the body of sporting director Taner Savut was recovered close to where Atsu had been found.

== Players ==
=== First-team squad ===
As of 3 September 2022

Note: Flags indicate national team as defined under FIFA eligibility rules; some limited exceptions apply. Players may hold more than one non-FIFA nationality.

No.	Pos.	Nation	Player
1	GK	TUR	Erce Kardeşler
3	DF	GUI	Simon Falette
4	MF	TUR	Onur Ergün
5	DF	BIH	Ognjen Vranješ
6	MF	TUR	Musa Çağıran
7	MF	POR	Rúben Ribeiro
8	MF	FRA	Mehdi Boudjemaa
9	FW	CGO	Dylan Saint-Louis
10	MF	FRA	Rayane Aabid
11	FW	GEO	Saba Lobzhanidze
12	DF	TUR	Kamil Çörekçi
15	DF	TUR	Recep Burak Yılmaz
16	MF	TUR	Selimcan Temel
19	MF	BEL	Muhammed Mert

No.	Pos.	Nation	Player
20	FW	LBR	Mohammed Kamara
21	FW	HUN	Kevin Varga
23	DF	CAN	Sam Adekugbe
25	FW	MAR	Ayoub El Kaabi
26	DF	TUR	Kaan Kanak
31	GK	TUR	Abdullah Yiğiter
33	FW	TUR	Koray Yağcı
53	DF	TUR	Burak Öksüz
77	MF	TUR	Sadik Baş
99	FW	TUR	Bertuğ Yıldırım
—	FW	CPV	Zé Luís
—	FW	CMR	Kévin Soni (on loan from Asteras Tripolis)
—	DF	TUR	Kerim Alici
—	MF	GHA	Christian Atsu

=== Out on loan ===
Note: Flags indicate national team as defined under FIFA eligibility rules; some limited exceptions apply. Players may hold more than one non-FIFA nationality.

No.	Pos.	Nation	Player
—	DF	TUR	Nazım Özcan (at Dynamic Herb Cebu)

== Pre-season and friendlies ==
Win Draw Loss Fixtures

=== Pre-season ===
15 July 2022 Friendly	Hatayspor (Turkey)	1–3	(Turkey) Çaykur Rizespor	Erzurum, Turkey
17:00 TRT (UTC+3)				Stadium: Yüksek İrtifa Training Center

18 July 2022 Friendly	Erzurumspor (Turkey)	0–1	(Turkey) Hatayspor	Erzurum, Turkey
17:30 TRT (UTC+3)				Stadium: Yüksek İrtifa Training Center

23 July 2022 Friendly	Ümraniyespor (Turkey)	3–0	(Turkey) Hatayspor	Erzurum, Turkey
17:30 TRT (UTC+3)				Stadium: Yüksek İrtifa Training Center

5 August 2022 Friendly	Adanaspor (Turkey)	2–2	(Turkey) Hatayspor	Adana, Turkey
18:00 TRT (UTC+3)				Stadium: Çatalan Sports Facilities

=== Mid-season ===
8 December 2022 Friendly	Fatih Karagümrük (Turkey)	2–0	(Turkey) Hatayspor	Antalya, Turkey
16:05 TRT (UTC+3)				Stadium: Calista Sports Center

11 December 2022 Friendly	Hatayspor (Turkey)	3–1	(Latvia) Liepāja	Antalya, Turkey
16:00 TRT (UTC+3)				Stadium: Calista Sports Center

14 December 2022 Friendly	Gaziantep (Turkey)	1–2	(Turkey) Hatayspor	Antalya, Turkey
13:00 TRT (UTC+3)				Stadium: Sueno Sports Center - Pitch 1

16 December 2022 Friendly	Hatayspor (Turkey)	2–5	(Italy) Lazio	Antalya, Turkey
18:00 TRT (UTC+3)				Stadium: Arslan Zeki Demirci Sports Complex

== Competitions ==
=== Overall record ===
Competition	First match	Last match	Starting round	Final position	Record							
Competition	First match	Last match	Starting round	Final position	Pld	W	D	L	GF	GA	GD	Win %
Süper Lig	12 August 2022	5 February 2023	Matchday 1	19th (withdrew)	36	6	5	25	19	83	−64	16.67
Turkish Cup	19 October 2022	19 October 2022	Third round	Third round	1	0	0	1	0	2	−2	0.00
Total					37	6	5	26	19	85	−66	16.22

Source: Competitions

=== Süper Lig ===
==== League table ====
Pos	Team	Pld	W	D	L	GF	GA	GD	Pts	Qualification or relegation
15	Alanyaspor	36	11	8	17	54	70	−16	41 (Note: Head-to-head points: İstanbulspor 11, Antalyaspor 10, Sivasspor 8, Alanyaspor 4.)	
16	Giresunspor (R)	36	10	10	16	42	60	−18	40	Relegation to TFF First League
17	Ümraniyespor (R)	36	7	9	20	47	64	−17	30	Relegation to TFF First League
18	Gaziantep (Note: On 12 February 2023, Gaziantep and Hatayspor withdrew from the league following the 2023 Turkey–Syria earthquake and were not relegated at the end of the season.)	36	6	7	23	31	72	−41	25	Withdrawn
19	Hatayspor	36	6	5	25	19	83	−64	23	Withdrawn

Source: Süper Lig
Rules for classification: 1) Points; 2) Head-to-head points; 3) Head-to-head goal difference; 4) Head-to-head goals scored; 5) Goal difference; 6) Goals scored; 7) Play-off.
(R) Relegated

==== Results summary ====
Overall								Home						Away					
Pld	W	D	L	GF	GA	GD	Pts	W	D	L	GF	GA	GD	W	D	L	GF	GA	GD
36	6	5	25	19	83	−64	23	4	4	17	12	37	−25	2	1	8	7	46	−39

Source: TFF.org

==== Results by round ====
Round	1	2	3	4	5	6	7	8	9	10	11	12	13	14	15	16	17	18	19	20	21	22	23	24	25	26	27	28	29	30	31	32	33	34	35	36	37	38
Ground	B	A	H	A	H	A	H	A	H	A	H	A	H	A	H	A	A	H	A	B	H	A	H	A	H	A	H	A	H	A	H	A	H	A	H	H	A	H
Result	B	L	L	L	D	L	L	W	W	L	W	L	D	W	D	L	D	D	L	B	W	L	W	L	L	L	L	L	L	L	L	L	L	L	L	L	L	L
Position	13	16	16	19	17	18	19	18	17	18	15	16	16	14	14	16	16	16	16	17	15	17	14	15	18⁣	18⁣	19⁣	19⁣	19⁣	19⁣	19⁣	19⁣	19⁣	19⁣	19⁣	19⁣	19⁣	19⁣

Source: TFF.org
A = Away; H = Home; B = Bye; W = Win; D = Draw; L = Loss

==== Matches ====
1	Bye

12 August 2022 2	Trabzonspor	1–0	Hatayspor	Trabzon
21:00 TRT (UTC+3)	Ömür 71'; Bakasetas (yellow card) 90'	Report	Ribeiro (yellow card) 11'; Çağıran (yellow card) 45'; Kamara (yellow card) 90+1'	Stadium: Şenol Güneş Sports Complex; Attendance: 29,789; Referee: Abdulkadir Bitigen

20 August 2022 3	Hatayspor	1–2	Gaziantep	Antakya
19:15 TRT (UTC+3)	El Kaabi 31'; Vranješ (yellow card) 58'; Çörekçi (yellow card) 59'	Report	Figueiredo 7'; Maxim (yellow card) 34'; Jevtović 49' (yellow card) 82'; Marković (yellow card) 51'	Stadium: New Hatay Stadium; Attendance: 3,970; Referee: Atilla Karaoğlan

28 August 2022 4	Kasımpaşa	1–0	Hatayspor	Istanbul
19:15 TRT (UTC+3)	Hajradinović 36'; Eysseric (yellow card) 59'; Engin (yellow card) 90+2'; Fall (yellow card) 90+4'	Report	Yılmaz (yellow card) 81'	Stadium: Recep Tayyip Erdoğan Stadium; Attendance: 1,776; Referee: Mert Güzenge

4 September 2022 5	Hatayspor	1–1	Adana Demirspor	Antakya
19:45 TRT (UTC+3)	Ergün 21'; El Kaabi (yellow card) 72'; Falette (yellow card) 72'; Adekugbe (yellow card) 75'; Kardeşler (yellow card) 90+6'; Ribeiro (yellow card) 90+7'; Yiğiter (yellow card) 90+10'	Report	Özbir (yellow card) 72'; Onyekuru (yellow card) 72'; Sanuç 90+9'	Stadium: New Hatay Stadium; Attendance: 8,969; Referee: Burak Şeker

10 September 2022 6	Konyaspor	1–0	Hatayspor	Eskişehir
17:00 TRT (UTC+3)	Bytyqi (yellow card) 33'; Paz 66'	Report	Çörekçi (yellow card) 33'	Stadium: New Eskişehir Stadium; Attendance: 1,625; Referee: Tugay Kaan Numanoğlu

16 September 2022 7	Hatayspor	0–4	Kayserispor	Antakya
20:00 TRT (UTC+3)	Falette (red card) 89'	Report	Mensah 5' (pen.); Cardoso 44'; Bayazit (yellow card) 75'; Bertolacci 87'; Gavranović 90' (pen.)	Stadium: New Hatay Stadium; Attendance: 4,416; Referee: Çağdaş Altay

2 October 2022 8	Sivasspor	1–2	Hatayspor	Sivas
14:30 TRT (UTC+3)	Yeşilyurt 23'; Yatabaré (yellow card) 51'	Report	El Kaabi 14'; Yıldırım 20'; Ribeiro (yellow card) 41' (yellow card) 42' (red card); Kanak (yellow card) 80'; Kardeşler (yellow card) 81'; Vranješ (yellow card) 81'	Stadium: New Sivas 4 Eylül Stadium; Attendance: 3,384; Referee: Erkan Özdamar

9 October 2022 9	Hatayspor	1–0	Alanyaspor	Antakya
17:00 TRT (UTC+3)	Mehdi Boudjemaa (yellow card) 41'; Burak Öksüz 72'; Kamil Ahmet Çörekçi (yellow card) 88'	Report	Karaca (yellow card) 81'; Balkovec (yellow card) 82'	Stadium: New Hatay Stadium; Attendance: 7,373; Referee: Abdulkadir Bitigen

15 October 2022 10	Fatih Karagümrük	3–0	Hatayspor	Istanbul
14:30 TRT (UTC+3)	Durmaz (yellow card) 11'; Caulker 36'; Nicholas (yellow card) 38'; Borini 45+3'; Biraschi (yellow card) 81'; Diagne 90+8' (pen.)	Report	Öksüz (yellow card) 21'; Ergün (yellow card) 81'	Stadium: Necmi Kadıoğlu Stadium; Attendance: 1,042; Referee: Volkan Bayarslan

24 October 2022 11	Hatayspor	2–1	Beşiktaş	Antakya
20:00 TRT (UTC+3)	Boudjemaa (yellow card) 28'; Vranješ (yellow card) 40'; Zé Luís 50'; Çörekçi (yellow card) 90'; Kanak 90'; Ergün (yellow card) 90+6'	Report	Weghorst 1'; Redmond (yellow card) 90+2'	Stadium: New Hatay Stadium; Attendance: 18,628; Referee: Kadir Sağlam

30 October 2022 12	Ankaragücü	4–1	Hatayspor	Ankara
14:30 TRT (UTC+3)	Beridze 3'; Mujakić (yellow card) 58'; Antalyalı 61'; Sowe 69'; Ciğerci (yellow card) 89'; Diack 90+2'	Report	El Kaabi 86' (pen.) (yellow card) 89'	Stadium: Eryaman Stadium; Attendance: 10,327; Referee: Yaşar Kemal Uğurlu

7 November 2022 13	Hatayspor	3–3	İstanbul Başakşehir	Antakya
20:00 TRT (UTC+3)	Yıldırım 12'; Vranješ (yellow card) 74'; El Kaabi 75'; Adekugbe (yellow card) 80'; Zé Luís 81'; Boudjemaa (yellow card) 90+1'	Report	Youssouf Ndayishimiye (yellow card) 42'; Aleksić (yellow card) 45+5' (goal) 65'; Chouiar (yellow card) 56'; Traoré 60'; Gürler 90+1'	Stadium: New Hatay Stadium; Attendance: 6,261; Referee: Suat Arslanboğa

13 November 2022 14	İstanbulspor	0–1	Hatayspor	Istanbul
17:00 TRT (UTC+3)	Rroca (yellow card) 23'; Ologo (yellow card) 76'; Ebert (yellow card) 88'	Report	El Kaabi 24' (pen.) (yellow card) 42'; Ergün (yellow card) 69'; Kanak (yellow card) 72'; Aabid (yellow card) 79'; Boudjemaa (yellow card) 90+1'	Stadium: Esenyurt Necmi Kadıoğlu Stadium; Attendance: 786; Referee: Mert Güzenge

24 December 2022 15	Hatayspor	1–1	Giresunspor	Antakya
13:30 TRT (UTC+3)	Öksüz (yellow card) 23'; Yıldırım 75'; Adekugbe (yellow card) 86'	Report	Uludağ (yellow card) 40'; Campuzano (yellow card) 83'; Bajić 87'; Sağlam (yellow card) 89'	Stadium: New Hatay Stadium; Attendance: 3,233; Referee: Mete Kalkavan

27 December 2022 16	Fenerbahçe	4–0	Hatayspor	Istanbul
20:00 TRT (UTC+3)	King 20', (yellow card) 51'; Batshuayi 26'; Dursun 86'; Gustavo Henrique 90+5'; Yandaş (yellow card) 90+6'	Report	Adekugbe (yellow card) 15'; Yıldırım (yellow card) 71'; Ergün (yellow card) 85'	Stadium: Şükrü Saracoğlu Stadium; Attendance: 32,961; Referee: Sarper Barış Saka

3 January 2023 17	Ümraniyespor	2–2	Hatayspor	Istanbul
17:00 TRT (UTC+3)	Oğuz Gürbulak (yellow card) 30'; Durel Avounou 39'; Umut Nayir 67' (pen.); Allyson Aires dos Santos (red card) 79'; Isaac Sackey (yellow card) 90+4'; Serkan Göksu (yellow card) 90+7'	Report	El Kaabi 24'; Saba Lobjanidze 53'; Simon Falette (yellow card) 65'; Ognjen Vranješ (yellow card) 71'	Stadium: Ümraniye Belediyesi Şehir Stadium; Attendance: 728; Referee: Hüseyin Göçek

7 January 2023 18	Hatayspor	0–0	Antalyaspor	Antakya
16:00 TRT (UTC+3)	Yıldırım (yellow card) 64'; Vranješ (yellow card) 85'	Report	Sertel (yellow card) 49'; Sarı (yellow card) 58'	Stadium: New Hatay Stadium; Attendance: 3,937; Referee: Yasin Kol

13 January 2023 19	Galatasaray	4–0	Hatayspor	Istanbul
20:00 TRT (UTC+3)	Aktürkoğlu 9'; Mata 45+4', 45+6'; Gomis 76'	Report		Stadium: Nef Stadium; Attendance: 42,901; Referee: Kadir Sağlam

20	Bye

28 January 2023 21	Hatayspor	2–1	Trabzonspor	Antakya
16:00 TRT (UTC+3)	El Kaabi 47'; Yıldırım 50'; Çağıran (yellow card) 53'; Boudjemaa (yellow card) 66'; Ribeiro (yellow card) 76'; Çörekçi (yellow card) 90+6'	Report	Bardhi 9'; Çakır (yellow card) 17'; Peres (yellow card) 27'	Stadium: New Hatay Stadium; Attendance: 10,216; Referee: Zorbay Küçük

1 February 2023 22	Gaziantep	4–1	Hatayspor	Gaziantep
17:00 TRT (UTC+3)	Djilobodji (yellow card) 35'; Jevtović 38'; Marković 56', 77'; Soyalp (yellow card) 71'; Artan (yellow card) 87'; Merkel 88'; Stankovski (yellow card) 90+6'	Report	El Kaabi 27'; Kanak (yellow card) 79'; Kardeşler (yellow card) 90+7'	Stadium: Gaziantep Stadium; Attendance: 4,001; Referee: Tugay Kaan Numanoğlu

5 February 2023 23	Hatayspor	1–0	Kasımpaşa	Antakya
16:00 TRT (UTC+3)	Zé Luís (yellow card) 39'; Ribeiro (yellow card) 64'; Atsu 90+7'	Report	Eysseric (yellow card) 63'; Tırpan (yellow card) 64'; Koita (yellow card) 90+1'	Stadium: New Hatay Stadium; Attendance: 4,470; Referee: Murat Erdoğan

24	Adana Demirspor	3–0 (w/o)	Hatayspor	Adana
				Stadium: New Adana Stadium

25	Hatayspor	0–3 (w/o)	Konyaspor	Antakya
				Stadium: New Hatay Stadium

26	Kayserispor	3–0 (w/o)	Hatayspor	Kayseri
				Stadium: Kadir Has Stadium

27	Hatayspor	0–3 (w/o)	Sivasspor	Antakya
				Stadium: New Hatay Stadium

28	Alanyaspor	3–0 (w/o)	Hatayspor	Antalya
				Stadium: Kırbıyık Holding Stadium

29	Hatayspor	0–3 (w/o)	Fatih Karagümrük	Antakya
				Stadium: New Hatay Stadium

30	Beşiktaş	3–0 (w/o)	Hatayspor	Istanbul
				Stadium: Vodafone Park

31	Hatayspor	0–3 (w/o)	Ankaragücü	Antakya
				Stadium: New Hatay Stadium

32	İstanbul Başakşehir	3–0 (w/o)	Hatayspor	Istanbul
				Stadium: Başakşehir Fatih Terim Stadium

33	Hatayspor	0–3 (w/o)	İstanbulspor	Antakya
				Stadium: New Hatay Stadium

34	Giresunspor	3–0 (w/o)	Hatayspor	Giresun
				Stadium: Çotanak Sports Complex

35	Hatayspor	0–3 (w/o)	Fenerbahçe	Antakya
				Stadium: New Hatay Stadium

36	Hatayspor	0–3 (w/o)	Ümraniyespor	Antakya
				Stadium: New Hatay Stadium

37	Antalyaspor	3–0 (w/o)	Hatayspor	Antalya
				Stadium: Antalya Stadium

38	Hatayspor	0–3 (w/o)	Galatasaray	Antakya
				Stadium: New Hatay Stadium

=== Turkish Cup ===
19 October 2022 Third round	Hatayspor	0–2	Düzcespor	Antakya
19:00 TRT (UTC+3)			Gündoğdu 31'; Karadağ 90+6'	Stadium: New Hatay Stadium
