= 2021–22 Hatayspor season =

Hatayspor
2021–22 season
- Chairman: Nihat Tazeaslan
- Manager: Ömer Erdoğan
- Stadium: New Hatay Stadium
- Süper Lig: 12th
- Turkish Cup: Round of 16
- Top goalscorer: League: Ayoub El Kaabi (18); All: Ayoub El Kaabi (18)

The 2021–22 season was the 54th season in the existence of Hatayspor and the club's second consecutive season in the top flight of Turkish football. In addition to the domestic league, Hatayspor participated in this season's edition of the Turkish Cup. The season covered the period from 1 July 2021 to 30 June 2022.

== Players ==
=== First-team squad ===
As of 8 February 2022

Note: Flags indicate national team as defined under FIFA eligibility rules; some limited exceptions apply. Players may hold more than one non-FIFA nationality.

No.	Pos.	Nation	Player
1	GK	(Morocco) MAR	Munir Mohamedi
2	DF	(Turkey) TUR	Burak Çamoğlu
4	MF	(Turkey) TUR	Onur Ergün
5	MF	(Ghana) GHA	Isaac Sackey
6	DF	(Guinea) GUI	Simon Falette
7	MF	(Portugal) POR	Rúben Ribeiro
8	MF	(France) FRA	Mehdi Boudjemaa
9	MF	(Egypt) EGY	Kahraba (on loan from Al Ahly)
11	FW	(Georgia (country)) GEO	Saba Lobzhanidze
12	DF	(Turkey) TUR	Kamil Çörekçi
16	MF	(Turkey) TUR	Selimcan Temel
17	MF	(Mali) MLI	Adama Traoré
19	MF	(Belgium) BEL	Muhammed Mert

No.	Pos.	Nation	Player
22	DF	(Turkey) TUR	Fatih Kuruçuk
23	DF	(Canada) CAN	Sam Adekugbe
25	FW	(Morocco) MAR	Ayoub El Kaabi
31	GK	(Turkey) TUR	Abdullah Yiğiter
33	GK	(Turkey) TUR	Yavuz Bugra Boyar
37	DF	(Azerbaijan) AZE	Emre Kaplan (on loan from İstanbul Başakşehir)
39	MF	(Algeria) ALG	Yassine Benzia (on loan from Dijon)
53	DF	(Turkey) TUR	Burak Öksüz
61	DF	(Turkey) TUR	Bülent Cevahir
77	MF	(Turkey) TUR	Sadik Baş
92	FW	(Senegal) SEN	Mame Biram Diouf
95	MF	(Republic of the Congo) CGO	Dylan Saint-Louis
99	FW	(Turkey) TUR	Bertuğ Yıldırım

=== Out on loan ===
Note: Flags indicate national team as defined under FIFA eligibility rules; some limited exceptions apply. Players may hold more than one non-FIFA nationality.

No.	Pos.	Nation	Player
20	FW	(Liberia) LBR	Mohammed Kamara (at FC Astana)
—	DF	(Turkey) TUR	Nazım Özcan (at Dynamic Herb Cebu)

== Pre-season and friendlies ==
Win Draw Loss

== Competitions ==
=== Overall record ===
Competition	First match	Last match	Starting round	Final position	Record							
Competition	First match	Last match	Starting round	Final position	Pld	W	D	L	GF	GA	GD	Win %
Süper Lig	14 August 2021	22 May 2022	Matchday 1	12th	38	15	8	15	56	60	−4	39.47
Turkish Cup	1 December 2021	9 February 2022	Fourth round	Round of 16	3	1	1	1	2	4	−2	33.33
Total					41	16	9	16	58	64	−6	39.02

Source: Competitions

=== Süper Lig ===
==== League table ====
Pos	Team	Pld	W	D	L	GF	GA	GD	Pts	Qualification or relegation
10	Sivasspor	38	14	12	12	52	50	+2	54	Qualification for the Europa League play-off round (Note: Sivasspor qualified for the Europa League play-off round as the 2021–22 Turkish Cup winners.)
11	Kasımpaşa	38	15	8	15	67	57	+10	53 (Note: Kasımpaşa finished ahead of Hatayspor on head-to-head points: Hatayspor 1–1 Kasımpaşa, Kasımpaşa 3–1 Hatayspor.)	
12	Hatayspor	38	15	8	15	56	60	−4	53	
13	Galatasaray	38	14	10	14	51	53	−2	52	
14	Kayserispor	38	12	11	15	54	61	−7	47	

Source: Süper Lig
Rules for classification: 1) Points; 2) Head-to-head points; 3) Head-to-head goal difference; 4) Head-to-head goals scored; 5) Goal difference; 6) Goals scored; 7) Play-off.

==== Results summary ====
Overall								Home						Away					
Pld	W	D	L	GF	GA	GD	Pts	W	D	L	GF	GA	GD	W	D	L	GF	GA	GD
0	0	0	0	0	0	0	0	0	0	0	0	0	0	0	0	0	0	0	0

Source: Spor Toto Süper Lig

==== Results by round ====
Round	1	2	3	4	5	6	7	8	9	10	11	12	13	14	15	16	17	18	19	20	21	22	23	24	25	26	27	28	29	30	31	32	33	34	35	36	37	38
Ground	H	A	H	A	H	A	H	A	H	A	H	A	H	A	H	A	A	H	A	A	H	A	H	A	H	A	H	A	H	A	H	A	H	A	H	H	A	H
Result	D	L	W	W	W	W	L	W	W	D	W	L	W	L	L	W	L	L	W	L	W	L	D	L	W	L	W	D	W	D	D	L	D	L	L	D	L	W
Position	9	11	9	6	4	3	5	4	2	2	2	2	2	3	4	3	4	6	5	6	4	7	8	9	7	8	8	8	6	7	7	8	9	10	10	11	13	12

Source: Spor Toto Süper Lig
A = Away; H = Home; W = Win; D = Draw; L = Loss

==== Matches ====
The league schedule was released on 13 July.

14 August 2021 1	Hatayspor	1–1	Kasımpaşa	Antakya
21:45 TRT (UTC+3)		Report		Stadium: New Hatay Stadium

23 August 2021 2	Galatasaray	2–1	Hatayspor	Istanbul
21:45 TRT (UTC+3)		Report		Stadium: Nef Stadium

28 August 2021 3	Hatayspor	5–0	Alanyaspor	Antakya
21:45 TRT (UTC+3)		Report		Stadium: New Hatay Stadium

12 September 2021 4	Çaykur Rizespor	0–2	Hatayspor	Rize
17:00 TRT (UTC+3)		Report		Stadium: Yeni Rize Şehir Stadium

19 September 2021 5	Hatayspor	2–1	Kayserispor	Antakya
19:00 TRT (UTC+3)		Report		Stadium: New Hatay Stadium

22 September 2021 6	Göztepe	0–2	Hatayspor	İzmir
20:00 TRT (UTC+3)		Report		Stadium: Gürsel Aksel Stadium

26 September 2021 7	Hatayspor	1–2	Fenerbahçe	Antakya
16:00 TRT (UTC+3)		Report		Stadium: New Hatay Stadium

3 October 2021 8	Yeni Malatyaspor	0–2	Hatayspor	Malatya
13:30 TRT (UTC+3)		Report		Stadium: New Malatya Stadium

18 October 2021 9	Hatayspor	2–1	Gaziantep	Antakya
20:00 TRT (UTC+3)		Report		Stadium: New Hatay Stadium

24 October 2021 10	Fatih Karagümrük	1–1	Hatayspor	Istanbul
13:30 TRT (UTC+3)				Stadium: Atatürk Olympic Stadium

30 October 2021 11	Hatayspor	1–0	Beşiktaş	Antakya
16:00 TRT (UTC+3)		Report		Stadium: New Hatay Stadium

7 November 2021 12	Adana Demirspor	1–0	Hatayspor	Adana
16:00 TRT (UTC+3)		Report		Stadium: New Adana Stadium

20 November 2021 13	Hatayspor	3–1	Antalyaspor	Antakya
13:30 TRT (UTC+3)		Report		Stadium: New Hatay Stadium

28 November 2021 14	Sivasspor	4–0	Hatayspor	Sivas
16:00 TRT (UTC+3)		Report		Stadium: New Sivas 4 Eylül Stadium

5 December 2021 15	Hatayspor	0–3	İstanbul Başakşehir	Antakya
16:00 TRT (UTC+3)		Report		Stadium: New Hatay Stadium; Referee: Erkan Özdamar

10 December 2021 16	Altay	1–2	Hatayspor	İzmir
20:00 TRT (UTC+3)	Rodríguez (yellow card) 18'; Pinares 21'; Kappel (yellow card) 43'; Ünlü (yellow card) 45'	Report	Kamara (yellow card) 18'; Diouf 38', (yellow card) 69', (penalty missed) 86'; Sackey (yellow card) 40'; Dylan Saint-Louis 75'	Stadium: Alsancak Mustafa Denizli Stadium; Referee: Mete Kalkavan

18 December 2021 17	Trabzonspor	2–0	Hatayspor	Trabzon
16:00 TRT (UTC+3)	Djaniny 24'; Cornelius 38'	Report	Ergün (yellow card) 90+5'	Stadium: Şenol Güneş Sports Complex; Referee: Yaşar Kemal Uğurlu

22 December 2021 18	Hatayspor	1–3	Konyaspor	Antakya
17:00 TRT (UTC+3)	El Kaabi 3'; Adekugbe (yellow card) 10' (yellow-red card) 31'; Kuruçuk (yellow card) 57'; Sackey (yellow card) 68'	Report	Šehić (yellow card) 27'; M'Poku 29', 54'; Gürler (yellow card) 68'; Cikalleshi (yellow card) 71'; Çalık (red card) 81'; Mahgoub 90+2'	Stadium: New Hatay Stadium; Referee: Halil Umut Meler

25 December 2021 19	Giresunspor	0–1	Hatayspor	Giresun
16:00 TRT (UTC+3)	Suleymanov (yellow card) 45'; Serginho (yellow card) 56'; Diarra (yellow card) 90'	Report	Ribeiro (yellow card) 15'; Falette (yellow card) 49'; El Kaabi 81'; Lobzhanidze (yellow card) 90'	Stadium: Çotanak Sports Complex; Referee: Volkan Bayarslan

8 January 2022 20	Kasımpaşa	3–1	Hatayspor	Istanbul
16:00 TRT (UTC+3)	Eysseric 1'; Bozok 6'; Trávník 50'	Report	Ergün 75'	Stadium: Recep Tayyip Erdoğan Stadium; Referee: Sarper Barış Saka

16 January 2022 21	Hatayspor	4–2	Galatasaray	Antakya
19:00 TRT (UTC+3)	Adekugbe (yellow card) 25'; Saint-Louis (yellow card) 27'; Diouf 43' (pen.); Kamara (yellow card) 37', (goal) 62'; Kuruçuk (yellow card) 68'; Lobzhanidze 79', 90+1'; Ribeiro (yellow card) 82'	Report	Öztürk (yellow card) 15'; Kılınç 23'; Kutlu (yellow card) 25'; Van Aanholt (penalty missed) 28'; Boey (yellow card) 37'; Bayram (yellow card) 45'; Aktürkoğlu 45+8'; Dervişoğlu (yellow card) 47'; Antalyalı (red card) 82'	Stadium: New Hatay Stadium; Referee: Erkan Özdamar

20 January 2022 22	Alanyaspor	6–0	Hatayspor	Alanya
17:00 TRT (UTC+3)	Akbaba 17', 59', 74'; Eduardo 31'; Bekiroğlu (yellow card) 40'; Aydın 77', 80'	Report	Kuruçuk (yellow card) 70'	Stadium: Kırbıyık Holding Stadium; Referee: Bahattin Şimşek

23 January 2022 23	Hatayspor	0–0	Çaykur Rizespor	Antakya
13:30 TRT (UTC+3)		Report		Stadium: New Hatay Stadium; Referee: Sarper Barış Saka

4 February 2022 24	Kayserispor	4–3	Hatayspor	Kayseri
20:00 TRT (UTC+3)		Report		Stadium: Kadir Has Stadium; Referee: Kadir Sağlam

14 February 2022 25	Hatayspor	2–1	Göztepe	Antakya
20:00 TRT (UTC+3)	Diouf 36'; El Kaabi 45'	Report	Akbunar 59'	Stadium: New Hatay Stadium; Referee: Atilla Karaoğlan

20 February 2022 26	Fenerbahçe	2–0	Hatayspor	Istanbul
19:00 TRT (UTC+3)	Dursun 67' (pen.), 81' (pen.)	Report	Ribeiro (yellow card) 17'; Temel (yellow card) 38'	Stadium: Şükrü Saracoğlu Stadium; Referee: Yasin Kol

27 February 2022 27	Hatayspor	5–2	Yeni Malatyaspor	Antakya
16:00 TRT (UTC+3)		Report		Stadium: New Hatay Stadium; Referee: Çağdaş Altay

7 March 2022 28	Gaziantep	2–2	Hatayspor	Gaziantep
20:00 TRT (UTC+3)		Report		Stadium: Gaziantep Stadium; Referee: Hüseyin Göçek

12 March 2022 29	Hatayspor	3–0	Fatih Karagümrük	Antakya
13:30 TRT (UTC+3)	Lobzhanidze 29'; El Kaabi 34', 58'	Report		Stadium: New Hatay Stadium; Referee: Yaşar Kemal Uğurlu

19 March 2022 30	Beşiktaş	1–1	Hatayspor	Istanbul
19:00 TRT (UTC+3)	Batshuayi 16'; Bozdoğan (yellow card) 60'	Report	Lobzhanidze 41'; El Kaabi (yellow card) 45'; Ergün (yellow card) 62'; Adekugbe (yellow card) 90+1'; Ribeiro (yellow card) 90+7'	Stadium: Vodafone Park; Referee: Yasin Kol

4 April 2022 31	Hatayspor	0–0	Adana Demirspor	Antakya
20:30 TRT (UTC+3)		Report		Stadium: New Hatay Stadium; Referee: Mustafa Kürşad Filiz

11 April 2022 32	Antalyaspor	4–1	Hatayspor	Antalya
20:30 TRT (UTC+3)		Report		Stadium: Antalya Stadium; Referee: Kadir Sağlam

16 April 2022 33	Hatayspor	1–1	Sivasspor	Antakya
13:30 TRT (UTC+3)		Report		Stadium: New Hatay Stadium; Referee: Ozan Ergün

24 April 2022 34	İstanbul Başakşehir	3–0	Hatayspor	Istanbul
16:00 TRT (UTC+3)		Report		Stadium: Başakşehir Fatih Terim Stadium; Referee: Arda Kardeşler

30 April 2022 35	Hatayspor	0–1	Altay	Antakya
19:00 TRT (UTC+3)		Report	Kappel 10'	Stadium: New Hatay Stadium; Referee: Abdulkadir Bitigen

6 May 2022 36	Hatayspor	1–1	Trabzonspor	Antakya
20:00 TRT (UTC+3)	Diouf 90+4'	Report	Djaniny 48'	Stadium: New Hatay Stadium; Referee: Volkan Bayarslan

15 May 2022 37	Konyaspor	3–1	Hatayspor	Konya
19:00 TRT (UTC+3)	Bytyqi 6'; Michalak 73'; Mahgoub 87'	Report	El Kaabi 16' (pen.)	Stadium: Konya Metropolitan Municipality Stadium; Referee: Erkan Özdamar

22 May 2022 38	Hatayspor	4–1	Giresunspor	Antakya
19:00 TRT (UTC+3)	El Kaabi 44', 81'; Yıldırım 55'; Kahraba 66'	Report	Bilazer 24'	Stadium: New Hatay Stadium; Referee: Ali Palabıyık

=== Turkish Cup ===
1 December 2021 Fourth round	Hatayspor	1–1 (a.e.t.) (5–4 p)	Eyüpspor	Antakya
21:00 TRT (UTC+3)	Kurucuk 74'		Keskin 19'	Stadium: New Hatay Stadium
	Penalties
	Diouf (penalty scored); Lobzhanidze (penalty missed); Adekugbe (penalty scored); Ribeiro (penalty scored); Traoré (penalty scored); Falette (penalty scored)		(penalty missed) Kaya; (penalty scored) Yılmaz; (penalty scored) Yardımcı; (penalty scored) Demir; (penalty scored) Alkılıç; (penalty missed) Keskin

28 December 2021 Fifth round	Hatayspor	1–0	Menemenspor	Antakya
15:00 TRT (UTC+3)	Saint-Louis 49'			Stadium: New Hatay Stadium

9 February 2022 Round of 16	Hatayspor	0–2	Antalyaspor	Antakya
17:30 TRT (UTC+3)		Report	Ndao 83'; Wright 87'	Stadium: New Hatay Stadium
