= Murat Yiğiter =

Turkish footballer

Personal information
- Date of birth: 8 May 1971 (age 55)
- Place of birth: Bingöl, Turkey
- Height: 1.89 m (6 ft 2 in)
- Position: Goalkeeper

Senior career*
Years	Team	Apps	(Gls)
1991–1992	Fenerbahçe	0	(0)
1992–1994	Sökespor	47	(0)
1994–1995	Göztepe	26	(0)
1995–2000	Vanspor	84	(0)
2000–2001	Çaykur Rizespor	17	(0)
2001	Trabzonspor	0	(0)
2001–2004	Çaykur Rizespor	51	(0)
2004–2006	Diyarbakırspor	23	(0)
2006	Kocaelispor	5	(0)

Managerial career
- 2007: Diyarbakırspor
- 2011: Diyarbakırspor
- * Club domestic league appearances and goals as of 20:19, 11 January 2022 (UTC)

Murat Yiğiter (born 8 May 1971), is a Turkish professional football manager and former footballer who played as a goalkeeper.

== Career ==
Yiğiter spent his entire career in Turkey, starting as the reserve goalkeeper at Fenerbahçe. He had stints at various pro clubs in the Süper Lig and TFF First League, including Sökespor, Vanspor, Çaykur Rizespor, Trabzonspor, Diyarbakırspor and Kocaelispor.

Yiğiter was briefly appointed as manager for Diyarbakırspor in 2021.

== Personal life ==
Murat is the father of Abdullah Yiğiter, who is also a professional football goalkeeper in Turkey.

== Honours ==
Diyarbakırspor

- TFF First League: 1998–99
