= Rúben Ribeiro (footballer, born 1987) =

Portuguese footballer

Personal information
- Full name: Rúben Tiago Rodrigues Ribeiro
- Date of birth: 1 August 1987 (age 39)
- Place of birth: Porto, Portugal
- Height: 1.75 m (5 ft 9 in)
- Position: Attacking midfielder

Youth career
- 1995–1996: Penafiel
- 1996–2000: Boavista
- 2000–2001: Pasteleira
- 2001–2002: Boavista
- 2002–2006: Leixões

Senior career*
Years	Team	Apps	(Gls)
2006–2011	Leixões	37	(1)
2011–2012	Penafiel	21	(0)
2012–2013	Beira-Mar	24	(6)
2013−2015	Paços Ferreira	11	(1)
2014	→ Rio Ave (loan)	8	(1)
2015	→ Gil Vicente (loan)	17	(2)
2016	Boavista	17	(0)
2016–2018	Rio Ave	47	(3)
2018	Sporting CP	9	(0)
2019	Al Ain	12	(2)
2020	Gil Vicente	13	(4)
2020–2023	Hatayspor	85	(3)
2023–2024	Chaves	23	(1)
Total		324	(24)
- * Club domestic league appearances and goals

Rúben Tiago Rodrigues Ribeiro (born 1 August 1987) is a Portuguese former professional footballer who played as an attacking midfielder.

He achieved Primeira Liga totals of 189 games and 18 goals, for Leixões, Beira-Mar, Paços de Ferreira, Rio Ave, Gil Vicente, Boavista, Sporting CP and Chaves, winning the Taça da Liga with Sporting in 2018. He also played professionally in the United Arab Emirates and Turkey.

== Club career ==
=== Early years ===
Born in Porto, Ribeiro spent most of his youth career with local Boavista F.C. before joining Leixões S.C. in 2002 to complete his development. He only managed to total 13 league appearances in his first three senior seasons, ten of which in 2008–09, spent in the Primeira Liga; his debut in the competition took place on 15 September 2007, when he came on as a late substitute in a 0–0 away draw against precisely Boavista.

Ribeiro played with F.C. Penafiel in the 2011–12 campaign, in the Segunda Liga. On 22 June 2012 he returned to the top flight, signing for four years with S.C. Beira-Mar.

=== Paços Ferreira ===
In the summer of 2013, after scoring a career-best six goals which was not enough to help prevent relegation, Ribeiro joined F.C. Paços de Ferreira of the same league on a three-year contract. He scored once during the first half of his first season, later labelling his spell there as "the worst" of his career, before spending the better part of the following months on loan to Rio Ave F.C. and Gil Vicente F.C. also in the top tier.

=== Boavista and Rio Ave ===
Ribeiro returned to Boavista on 7 January 2016, on a deal running until 30 June. He played his first league match 11 days later, when he featured the entire 4–0 home win over Vitória de Setúbal.

In the subsequent off-season, Ribeiro agreed a to a two-year contract at former club Rio Ave. In one of his first games on 4 August 2016 in the third qualifying round of the UEFA Europa League, he equalised in a 1–1 home draw with SK Slavia Prague, though the Czechs advanced on the away goals rule. He started 27 times in his debut campaign, helping the Luís Castro-led side to a seventh-place finish.

On 13 December 2017, Ribeiro was one of three players on target in the 3–2 home defeat of S.L. Benfica in the Taça de Portugal.

=== Sporting CP ===
Near the end of the calendar year, Ribeiro signed with Sporting CP who paid €400,000 to acquire his services on a two-and-a-half-year deal effective as of 11 January 2018. He was awarded the #7 jersey which had been previously worn by several players who failed to perform at the club, and made his debut on 14 January by starting and playing 66 minutes in a 3–0 victory against C.D. Aves at the Estádio José Alvalade. He started in the Taça da Liga final thirteen days later, being substituted at half time in the win over Vitória de Setúbal.

In the summer of 2018, Ribeiro was one of several players who unilaterally severed their contracts with Sporting, after an attack by fans on the training ground.

=== Later career ===
Ribeiro left his country's league for the first time in October 2018 when he joined Abu Dhabi-based Al Ain FC, with the deal being confirmed the following 30 January. He returned to Portugal late in the same year, agreeing to a short-team contract at former team Gil Vicente.

On 16 August 2020, Ribeiro moved abroad again, joining Turkish Süper Lig side Hatayspor on a free transfer. In July 2022, the 35-year-old signed a two-year extension. He survived an earthquake the following February by jumping out his window.

Ribeiro returned to Portugal on 1 September 2023, on a contract at top-division G.D. Chaves.

== Career statistics ==
As of match played 18 May 2024

Club	Season	League			National cup		League cup		Continental		Total	
Club	Season	Division	Apps	Goals	Apps	Goals	Apps	Goals	Apps	Goals	Apps	Goals
Leixões	2006–07	Liga de Honra	2	0	1	0	—		—		3	0
Leixões	2007–08	Primeira Liga	1	0	0	0	1	0	—		2	0
Leixões	2008–09	Primeira Liga	10	0	0	0	0	0	—		10	0
Leixões	2009–10	Primeira Liga	9	0	2	0	0	0	—		11	0
Leixões	2010–11	Liga de Honra	15	1	3	0	2	0	—		20	1
Leixões	Total		37	1	6	0	3	0	—		46	1
Penafiel	2011–12	Liga de Honra	21	0	3	2	8	0	—		32	2
Beira-Mar	2012–13	Primeira Liga	24	6	1	0	4	2	—		29	8
Paços Ferreira	2013–14	Primeira Liga	8	1	1	0	0	0	5 (Note: Appearances in UEFA Europa League)	0	14	1
Paços Ferreira	2014–15	Primeira Liga	3	0	0	0	2	0	—		5	0
Paços Ferreira	Total		11	1	1	0	2	0	5	0	19	1
Rio Ave (loan)	2013–14	Primeira Liga	8	1	3	1	3	0	—		14	2
Gil Vicente (loan)	2014–15	Primeira Liga	17	2	0	0	0	0	—		17	2
Boavista	2015–16	Primeira Liga	17	0	1	0	0	0	—		18	0
Rio Ave	2016–17	Primeira Liga	31	0	0	0	3	0	2	1	36	1
Rio Ave	2017–18	Primeira Liga	16	3	4	1	3	0	—		23	4
Rio Ave	Total		47	3	4	1	6	0	2	1	59	5
Sporting CP	2017–18	Primeira Liga	9	0	1	0	2	0	6	0	18	0
Al Ain	2018–19	UAE Pro League	12	2	0	0	0	0	0	0	12	2
Gil Vicente	2019–20	Primeira Liga	13	4	0	0	0	0	—		13	4
Hatayspor	2020–21	Süper Lig	37	1	2	0	—		—		39	1
Hatayspor	2021–22	Süper Lig	29	2	2	0	—		—		31	2
Hatayspor	2022–23	Süper Lig	19	0	1	0	—		—		20	0
Hatayspor	Total		85	3	5	0	—		—		90	3
Chaves	2023–24	Primeira Liga	23	1	0	0	0	0	—		23	1
Career total			324	24	25	4	28	2	13	1	390	31

== Honours ==
Leixões

- Segunda Liga: 2006–07

Sporting CP

- Taça da Liga: 2017–18
