= Mehdi Boudjemaa =

Algerian footballer (born 1998)

Mehdi Boudjemaa ⵎⴻⵀⴷⵉ ⴱⵓⵊⴻⵎⴰ
Personal information
- Date of birth: 7 April 1998 (age 28)
- Place of birth: Pontoise, France
- Height: 1.82 m (6 ft 0 in)
- Position: Central midfielder

Team information
- Current team: CR Belouizdad
- Number: 6

Youth career
- 2008–2013: Beauvais
- 2013–2014: Strasbourg
- 2014–2015: Beauvais
- 2015–2016: Saint-Quentin

Senior career*
Years	Team	Apps	(Gls)
2016–2019	Guingamp II	59	(5)
2019–2021	Guingamp	3	(0)
2020	→ Quevilly-Rouen (loan)	5	(0)
2020–2021	→ Laval (loan)	30	(0)
2021–2024	Hatayspor	64	(1)
2023	→ Ferencváros (loan)	3	(0)
2024	Çorum	12	(0)
2025–2026	JS Kabylie	29	(0)
2026	Al Wehda	16	(1)
2026–	CR Belouizdad	0	(0)

International career^{‡}
2025	Algeria A'	2	(0)
- * Club domestic league appearances and goals as of 27 January 2026 ‡ National team caps and goals as of 16:37, 15 August 2025 (UTC)

Mehdi Boudjemaa (Arabic: مهدي بوجمعة; Tamazight: ⵎⴻⵀⴷⵉ ⴱⵓⵊⴻⵎⴰ; born 7 April 1998) is an Algerian professional footballer who plays as central midfielder for CR Belouizdad.

== Career ==
=== Guingamp ===
Born in Pontoise in the Val-d'Oise department of Île-de-France from parents of Tizi Ouzou, Kabylia, Boudjemaa was raised in Beauvais, Oise. He began playing for AS Beauvais Oise, and had a year at RC Strasbourg Alsace when he was 15, before returning to Beauvais to play in the national under-17 division. After their relegation, he had one season at Olympique Saint-Quentin where he attracted the attention of EA Guingamp.

Boudjemaa began playing for Guingamp's reserve team in the fifth-tier Championnat National 3. After turning down an approach from Stade Brestois 29, he was first called up by the first team for their Ligue 1 game at Stade Malherbe Caen on 20 October 2018, remaining unused in a goalless draw. The following 19 February, he signed his first professional contract, for two-and-a-half years. He made his professional debut with the club in a 1–0 Ligue 2 win over Orléans on 9 August 2019, as a 63rd-minute substitute for Bryan Pelé.

On 9 January 2020, Boudjemaa was loaned to third-tier Championnat National team US Quevilly-Rouen Métropole, where he made five appearances before the season was curtailed by the COVID-19 pandemic. He joined Stade Lavallois of the same league on the same basis on 5 June.

=== Hatayspor ===
Boudjemaa moved abroad for the first time on 8 July 2021, joining Hatayspor of the Turkish Süper Lig. The following 4 April, he was sent off for two late yellow cards in a goalless draw at home to local rivals Adana Demirspor.

On 6 January 2023, Boudjemaa survived the earthquake that killed Hatayspor player Christian Atsu and sporting director Taner Savut among tens of thousands of others.

The club withdrew from the season and ten days later, he joined Hungarian Nemzeti Bajnokság I leaders Ferencvárosi TC on loan with the option to buy. He won the 2022–23 Nemzeti Bajnokság I.

=== JS Kabylie ===
In January 2025, Boudjemaa signed a contract, with JS Kabylie, until the end of the 2026–27 season. On 19 January 2026, he left JSK.

=== Al Wehda ===
On 26 January 2026, he joined Saudi club Al Wehda.

=== CR Belouizdad ===
On 10 July 2026, he joined CR Belouizdad.

== International career ==
Born in France, Boudjemaa holds French and Algerian nationalities. In 2017, he expressed interest in representing the Algeria national football team.

In April 2025, he was called by Madjid Bougherra to play a decisive double confrontation against Gambia, with the Algeria A' national football team, as part of the second round of the qualifiers, for the 2024 CHAN.

In July 2025, he was selected by Madjid Bougherra to participate in the 2024 CHAN, with the Algeria A' national football team.

== Honours ==
Ferencváros

- Nemzeti Bajnokság I: 2022–23
