= Bertuğ Yıldırım =

Turkish footballer (born 2002)

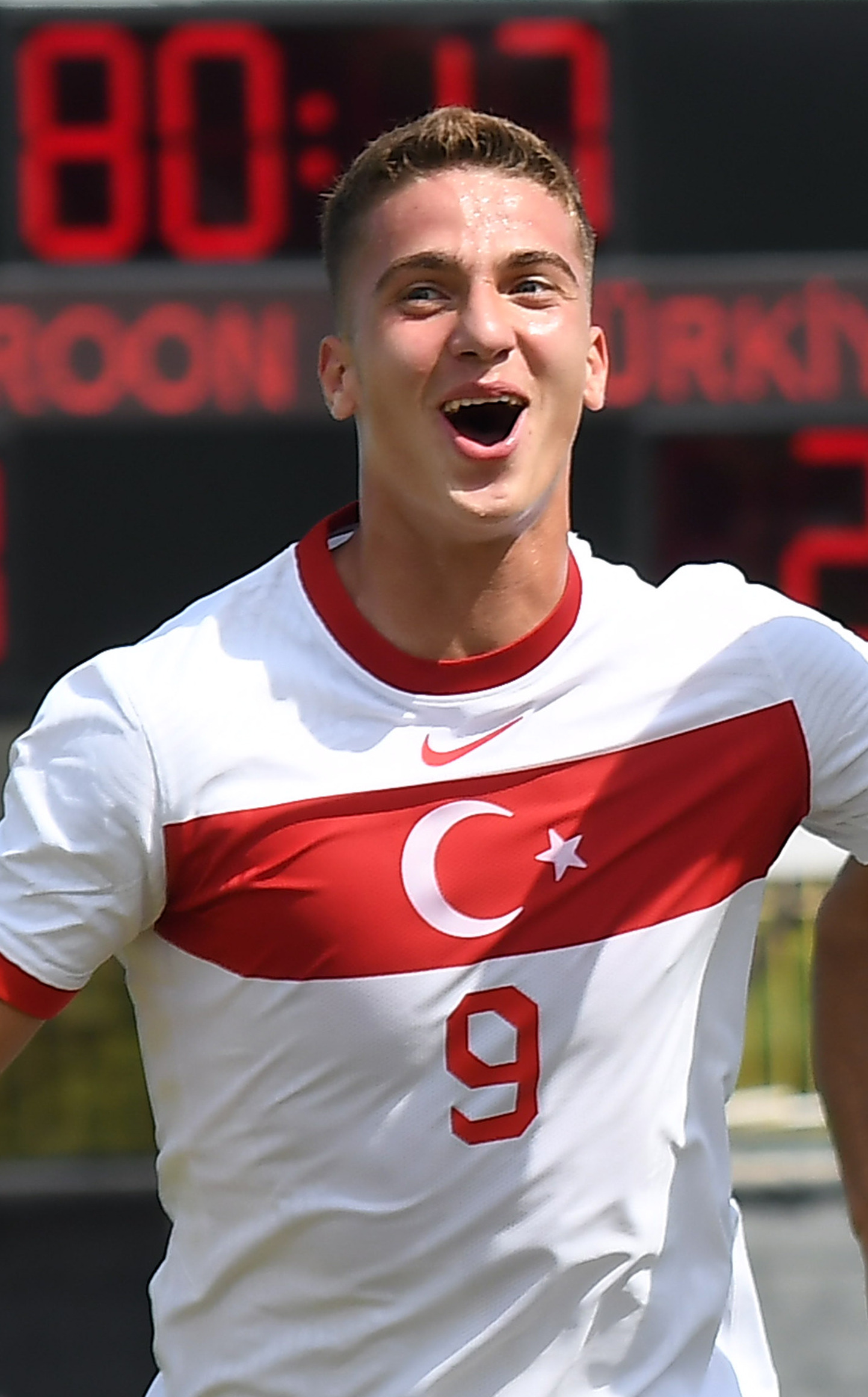
- Yıldırım with Turkey U23 in 2022

Personal information
- Full name: Bertuğ Özgür Yıldırım
- Date of birth: 12 July 2002 (age 24)
- Place of birth: Kâğıthane, Turkey
- Height: 1.93 m (6 ft 4 in)
- Position: Forward

Team information
- Current team: Başakşehir
- Number: 99

Youth career
- 2013–2018: Sarıyer

Senior career*
Years	Team	Apps	(Gls)
2018–2021	Sarıyer	31	(6)
2021–2023	Hatayspor	35	(6)
2023	→ Antalyaspor (loan)	13	(2)
2023–2025	Rennes	21	(0)
2024–2025	→ Getafe (loan)	22	(1)
2025–	Başakşehir	28	(7)

International career^{‡}
2022–2023	Turkey U21	8	(5)
2022	Turkey U23	2	(0)
2023–	Turkey	5	(2)
Medal record
Men's football
Representing Turkey
Islamic Solidarity Games
Gold medal – first place	2021 Konya
- * Club domestic league appearances and goals as of 7 November 2026 ‡ National team caps and goals as of 23:59, 14 October 2024 (UTC)

Bertuğ Özgür Yıldırım (born 12 July 2002) is a Turkish professional footballer who plays as a forward for Süper Lig club Başakşehir, and the Turkey national team.

== Club career ==
=== Sarıyer ===
Yıldırım is a youth product of Sarıyer, and began his senior career with them in the TFF Second League in 2018.

=== Hatayspor ===
Yıldırım transferred to Hatayspor on 3 June 2021. He made his professional debut with Hatayspor in a 1–1 Süper Lig tie against Kasımpaşa on 14 August 2021.

==== Loan to Antalyaspor ====
After 6-7 February 2023 Kahramanmaraş earthquakes, Süper Lig was suspended for over a week to mourn the victims. Clubs from affected regions: Süper Lig clubs Hatayspor, and Gaziantep FK withdrew from competition. On 16 February 2023, Bertuğ loaned to Antalyaspor.

=== Rennes ===
On 29 August 2023, Yıldırım signed a five-year contract with Ligue 1 side Rennes.

==== Loan to Getafe ====
On 23 August 2024, Yıldırım joined La Liga club Getafe on a season-long loan with an option to buy.

=== Başakşehir ===
On 12 September 2025, Yıldırım signed with Süper Lig club Başakşehir.

== International career ==
Yıldırım is a youth international for Turkey, having played for the Turkey U21s, and then with the Turkey U23s at the 2021 Islamic Solidarity Games.

In his first game with the senior national team, he scored the equalizer in 1–1 draw with Armenia.

On 7 June 2024, he is in the final list of 26 players selected by Vincenzo Montella to compete for UEFA Euro 2024.

== Career statistics ==
=== Club ===
As of match played 7 November 2026

Appearances and goals by club, season and competition
Club	Season	League			National cup (Note: Includes Turkish Cup and Coupe de France)		Europe		Total	
Club	Season	Division	Apps	Goals	Apps	Goals	Apps	Goals	Apps	Goals
Sarıyer	2018–19	TFF Second League	1	0	—		—		1	0
Sarıyer	2019–20	TFF Second League	1	0	0	0	—		1	0
Sarıyer	2020–21	TFF Second League	29	6	1	0	—		30	6
Sarıyer	Total		31	6	1	0	—		32	6
Hatayspor	2021–22	Süper Lig	16	1	1	0	—		17	1
Hatayspor	2022–23	Süper Lig	16	4	1	0	—		17	4
Hatayspor	2023–24	Süper Lig	3	1	—		—		3	1
Hatayspor	Total		35	6	2	0	—		37	6
Antalyaspor (loan)	2022–23	Süper Lig	13	2	—		—		13	2
Rennes	2023–24	Ligue 1	21	0	2	0	5 (Note: Appearances in UEFA Europa League)	1	28	1
Rennes	2025–26	Ligue 1	1	0	—		—		1	0
Rennes	Total		22	0	2	0	5	1	29	1
Getafe (loan)	2024–25	La Liga	22	1	4	2	—		26	3
Başakşehir	2025–26	Süper Lig	19	7	3	0	—		22	7
Başakşehir	2026–27	Süper Lig	9	0	0	0	2 (Note: Appearances in UEFA Conference League)	0	11	0
Başakşehir	Total		28	7	3	0	2	0	33	7
Career total			151	22	12	2	7	1	170	25

=== International ===
As of match played 14 October 2024

Appearances and goals by national team and year
National team	Year	Apps	Goals
Turkey	2023	3	2
Turkey	2024	2	0
Total		5	2

Scores and results list Turkey's goal tally first, score column indicates score after each Yıldırım goal.

List of international goals scored by Bertuğ Yıldırım
No.	Date	Venue	Cap	Opponent	Score	Result	Competition
1	8 September 2023	New Eskişehir Stadium, Eskişehir, Turkey	1	Armenia	1–1	1–1	UEFA Euro 2024 qualifying
2	12 September 2023	Cegeka Arena, Genk, Belgium	2	Japan	2–3	2–4	Friendly

== Honours ==
Turkey U23

- Islamic Solidarity Games: 2021
