= Kaan Kanak =

Turkish footballer

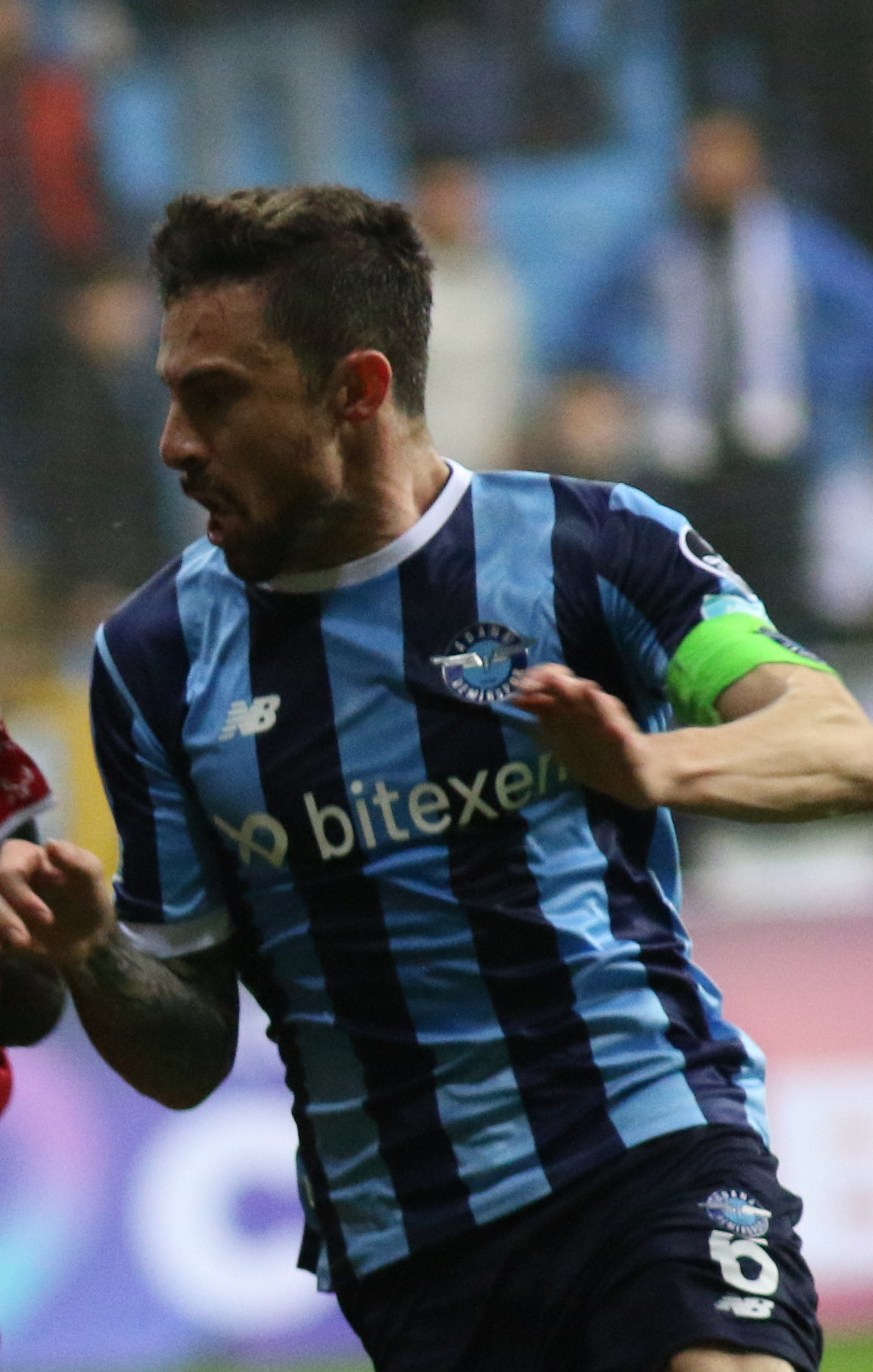
- Kanak in 2022

Personal information
- Date of birth: 6 October 1990 (age 36)
- Place of birth: Yozgat, Turkey
- Height: 1.80 m (5 ft 11 in)
- Position: Left back

Team information
- Current team: Güzide Gebzespor
- Number: 26

Youth career
- 2004–2009: Ankaragücü

Senior career*
Years	Team	Apps	(Gls)
2009–2014	Ankaragücü	155	(24)
2010	→ Bugsaş (loan)	2	(0)
2011	→ Hatayspor (loan)	6	(0)
2011	→ İnegölspor (loan)	1	(0)
2014–2018	Eskişehirspor	109	(12)
2018–2020	Alanyaspor	5	(0)
2019	→ Adana Demirspor (loan)	17	(1)
2020–2021	BB Erzurumspor	13	(1)
2021–2022	Adana Demirspor	34	(0)
2022–2023	Hatayspor	16	(1)
2023–2025	Manisa	49	(1)
2025–	Güzide Gebzespor	10	(0)

International career^{‡}
2015	Turkey U23	2	(0)
- * Club domestic league appearances and goals as of 9 November 2025 ‡ National team caps and goals as of 2 September 2015

Kaan Kanak (born 6 October 1990) is a Turkish professional footballer who plays as a left back for TFF 2. Lig club Güzide Gebzespor.

== International career ==
On 20 March 2015, Kanak was selected for the Turkey national football team to play against Luxembourg.

== Honours ==
Adana Demirspor

- TFF 1. Lig: 2020–21

Alanyaspor

- Turkish Cup: runner-up 2019–20
