= Christian Atsu =

Ghanaian footballer (1992–2023)

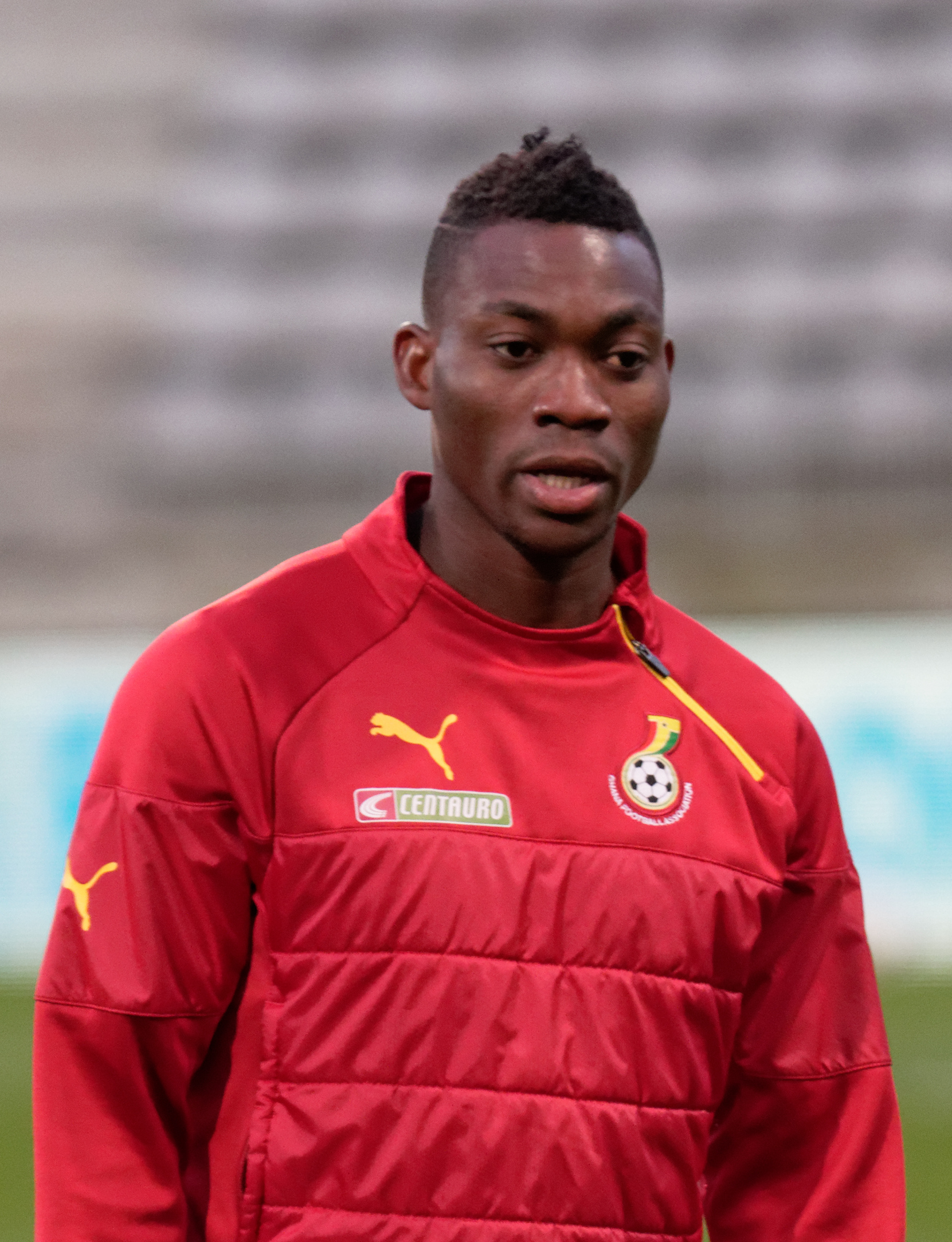
- Atsu with Ghana in 2015

Personal information
- Full name: Christian Atsu Twasam
- Date of birth: 10 January 1992
- Place of birth: Ada Foah, Ghana
- Date of death: 6 February 2023 (aged 31)
- Place of death: Antakya, Turkey
- Height: 1.65 m (5 ft 5 in)
- Position: Winger

Youth career
- Feyenoord Academy Ghana
- Cheetah
- 2009–2011: Porto

Senior career*
Years	Team	Apps	(Gls)
2011–2013	Porto	17	(1)
2011–2012	→ Rio Ave (loan)	27	(6)
2013–2017	Chelsea	0	(0)
2013–2014	→ Vitesse (loan)	28	(5)
2014–2015	→ Everton (loan)	5	(0)
2015–2016	→ Bournemouth (loan)	0	(0)
2016	→ Málaga (loan)	12	(2)
2016–2017	→ Newcastle United (loan)	32	(5)
2017–2021	Newcastle United	75	(3)
2021–2022	Al Raed	8	(0)
2022–2023	Hatayspor	3	(1)
Total		207	(23)

International career
2012–2019	Ghana	65	(9)
Medal record
Representing Ghana
Men's football
Africa Cup of Nations
Runner-up	2015 Equatorial Guinea
- * Club domestic league appearances and goals

Christian Atsu Twasam (10 January 1992 – 6 February 2023) was a Ghanaian professional footballer who primarily played as a winger, although he was deployed as an attacking midfielder or left back.

Atsu began his career with Porto, also spending a season on loan at Rio Ave. In 2013, he was signed by Chelsea for £3.5 million, who subsequently loaned him to Vitesse, Everton, Bournemouth and Málaga. After spending the 2016–17 season on loan at Newcastle United, he completed a permanent transfer to the club in May 2017. Following the end of his four-year contract, he played for Al Raed in Saudi Arabia and Hatayspor in Turkey, where he died in the 2023 Turkey–Syria earthquake at age 31.

A full international with 65 caps from 2012 to 2019, Atsu represented Ghana at the 2014 FIFA World Cup and four Africa Cup of Nations tournaments. He helped the team finish as runners-up at the 2015 Africa Cup of Nations, in which he also won Player of the Tournament and Goal of the Tournament.

== Early life ==
Atsu was born in Ada Foah, Greater Accra Region. He grew up in extreme poverty. He was one of ten siblings, including his twin sister, while his father was a fisherman and farmer on the banks of the Volta River.

Atsu spent a portion of his education at the Feyenoord Football Academy in Gomoa Fetteh, in the Central Region of Ghana and later attended the West African Football Academy at Sogakope, in the Volta Region of Ghana. He later moved to join Cheetah, a club based in Kasoa.

== Club career ==
=== Porto ===
Atsu arrived at Porto at the age of 17. On 14 May 2011, he was called up by first-team manager André Villas-Boas for a Primeira Liga match against Marítimo, but he did not leave the bench.

As with teammate Kelvin, Atsu was sent on loan to fellow league side Rio Ave for the 2011–12 season. He made his debut in the competition on 28 August 2011, in a 0–1 home loss against Olhanense. On 16 December 2011, Atsu opened the score at Estádio da Luz against Benfica in the 24th minute, but the hosts eventually won it 5–1.

He returned to Porto for the 2012–13 campaign, starting in nine of his league appearances as they won the national championship for the third consecutive time.

=== Chelsea ===
On 1 September 2013, Atsu agreed to join Chelsea on a five-year contract, for a reported £3.5 million, being immediately loaned to Dutch club Vitesse, for the rest of the 2013–14 season.

==== Loan to Vitesse ====
On 6 October 2013, Atsu made his debut against Feyenoord as a substitute, replacing Kazaishvili in the 77th minute. He went on to provide an assist to Mike Havenaar, but it was not enough to prevent a 2–1 loss for Vitesse. On 19 October, Atsu made his first start against Heerenveen, which ended in a 3–2 win for Vitesse. On 9 November, he converted a penalty for his first goal with Vitesse, against Utrecht; the match ended in a 3–1 win for Vitesse.

In total, Atsu played 30 games and scored 5 goals for the Dutch side as they finished 6th in the league and qualified to the playoffs.

==== Loan to Everton ====
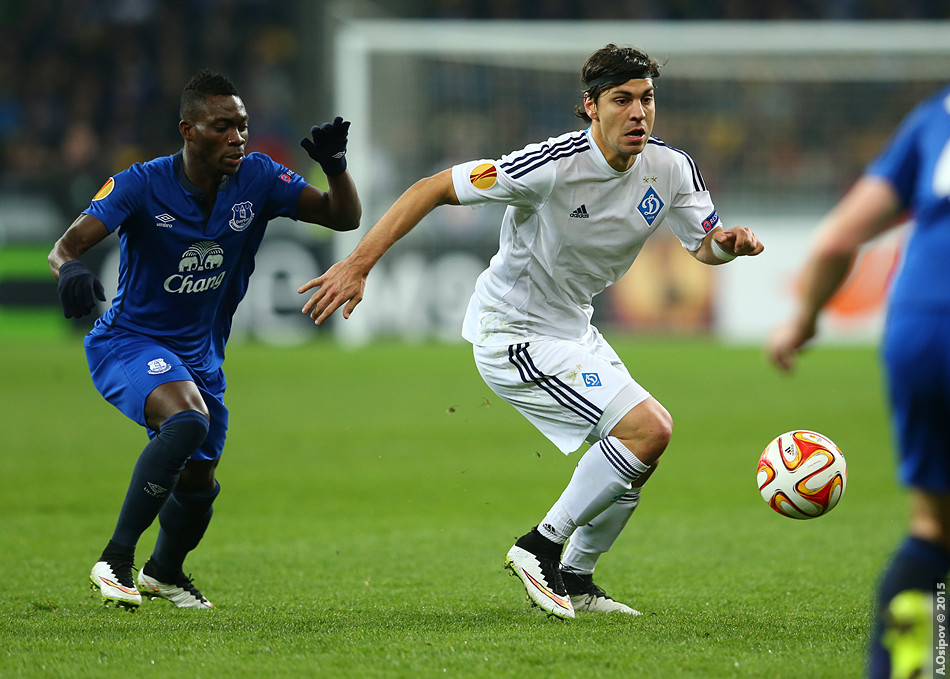
Atsu (left) playing for Everton in 2015

On 13 August 2014, Atsu joined fellow Premier League club Everton on loan until the end of the 2014–15 season. He made his first appearance for the club ten days later, coming on as an 85th-minute substitute for Kevin Mirallas in a 2–2 draw with Arsenal at Goodison Park.

Atsu made his first start in the league on 21 September 2014 against Crystal Palace, which ended in a 2–3 home loss. After his absence due to the Africa Cup of Nations, he returned to the line-up on 19 February 2015 in a Europa League match against Young Boys, playing out the last five minutes after replacing hat-trick scorer Romelu Lukaku. and came off the bench three days later to set up a late equaliser in a 2–2 draw at home to Leicester City.

On 15 March 2015, in the match against Newcastle United, he came off the bench with five minutes remaining, and provided an assist to fellow substitute Ross Barkley for Everton's third goal of a 3–0 home victory. Following Atsu's impact as a substitute in the above games, he was picked to start the second leg of a Europa League Round of 16 match away to Dynamo Kyiv on 19 March with regular right-winger Aaron Lennon cup-tied, with Everton leading 2–1 from the first leg. His team were eliminated after losing 5–2 on the night, he was withdrawn in the 65th minute, and that was his final first-team appearance for Everton.

==== Loan to Bournemouth ====
On 29 May 2015, Atsu was loaned to newly promoted Premier League team Bournemouth for the upcoming season, with club Chief Executive Neill Blake calling the deal "a huge coup". He made his debut on 25 August in the second round of the League Cup, starting in a 4–0 win at Hartlepool United. Atsu's only other appearance was in the next round's victory at Preston North End; he did not feature in any Bournemouth matchday squad in the league and he was recalled from his loan by Chelsea on 1 January 2016.

==== Loan to Málaga ====
On 24 January 2016, Atsu gave an interview with the BBC World Service in which he spoke about leaving Chelsea and his imminent transfer to Levante. The next day, it was confirmed that he would be instead moving to Málaga on loan. On 5 February 2016, Atsu made his debut in the starting eleven and scored in a 3–0 victory over Getafe.

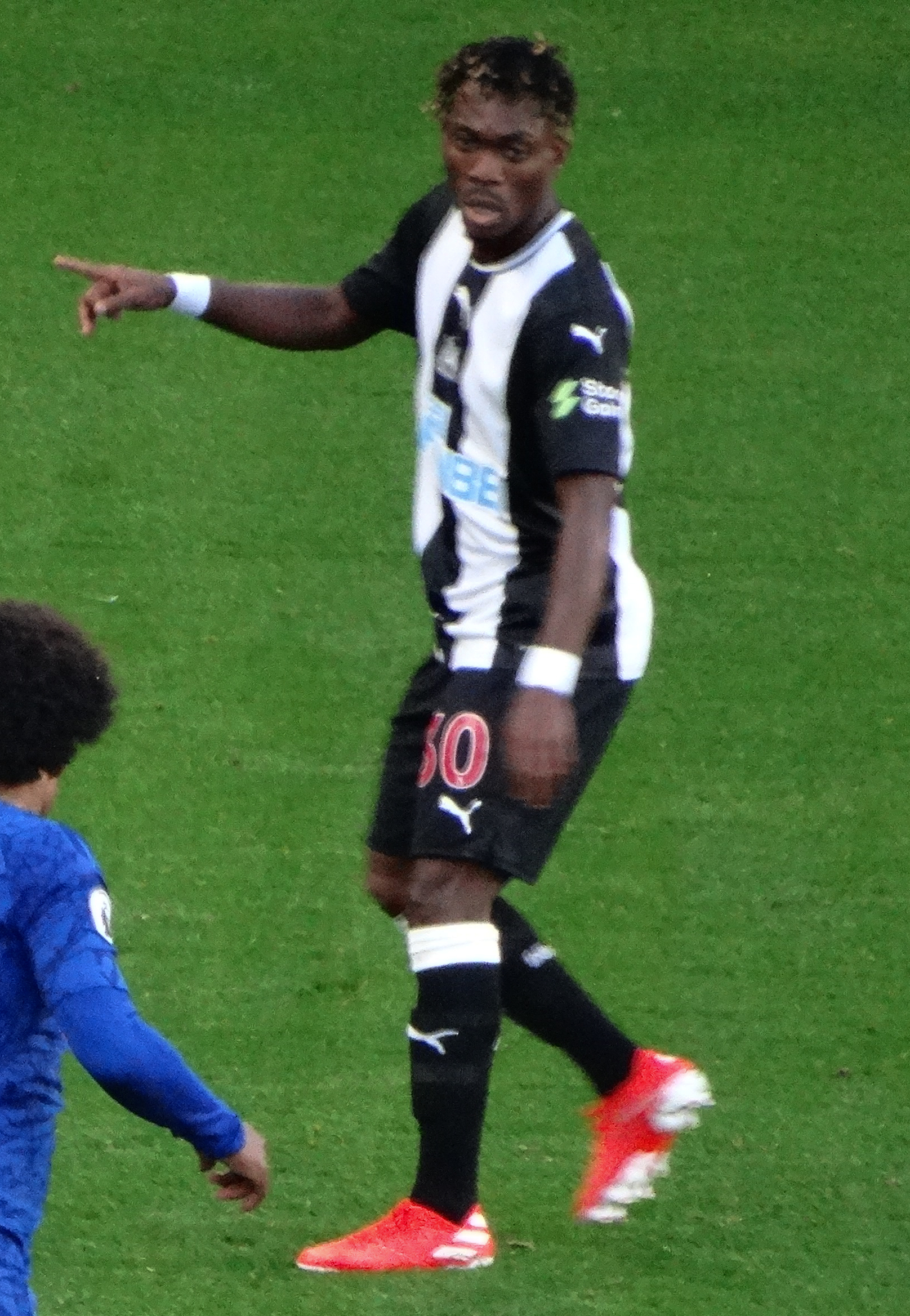
Atsu playing for Newcastle in 2019

=== Newcastle United ===
On 31 August 2016, Atsu joined Newcastle United on a one-year loan deal with an option to buy clause in the contract. On 13 September, his debut for the club came on as a substitute for Yoan Gouffran in the 61st minute in a 6–0 away victory against Queens Park Rangers at Loftus Road, where he provided the assist to Aleksandar Mitrović to earn their fifth goal. Atsu scored his first goal for the club in a 1–0 win against Rotherham United on 1 October, followed by further goals against Cardiff City and Wigan Athletic.

In May 2017, Atsu signed a four-year deal to join Newcastle permanently for £6.2 million from Chelsea. He was released at its conclusion.

=== Al-Raed ===
On 17 July 2021, Atsu joined Al-Raed. Limited by injury, he played only eight games in the Saudi Professional League.

=== Hatayspor ===
On 6 September 2022, Atsu signed for Süper Lig club Hatayspor on an initial one-year contract with the option for a further year. He played three league games and one in the Turkish Cup, and scored the only goal at home to Kasımpaşa in the seventh minute of added time on 5 February 2023, the day before the earthquake that killed him.

== International career ==
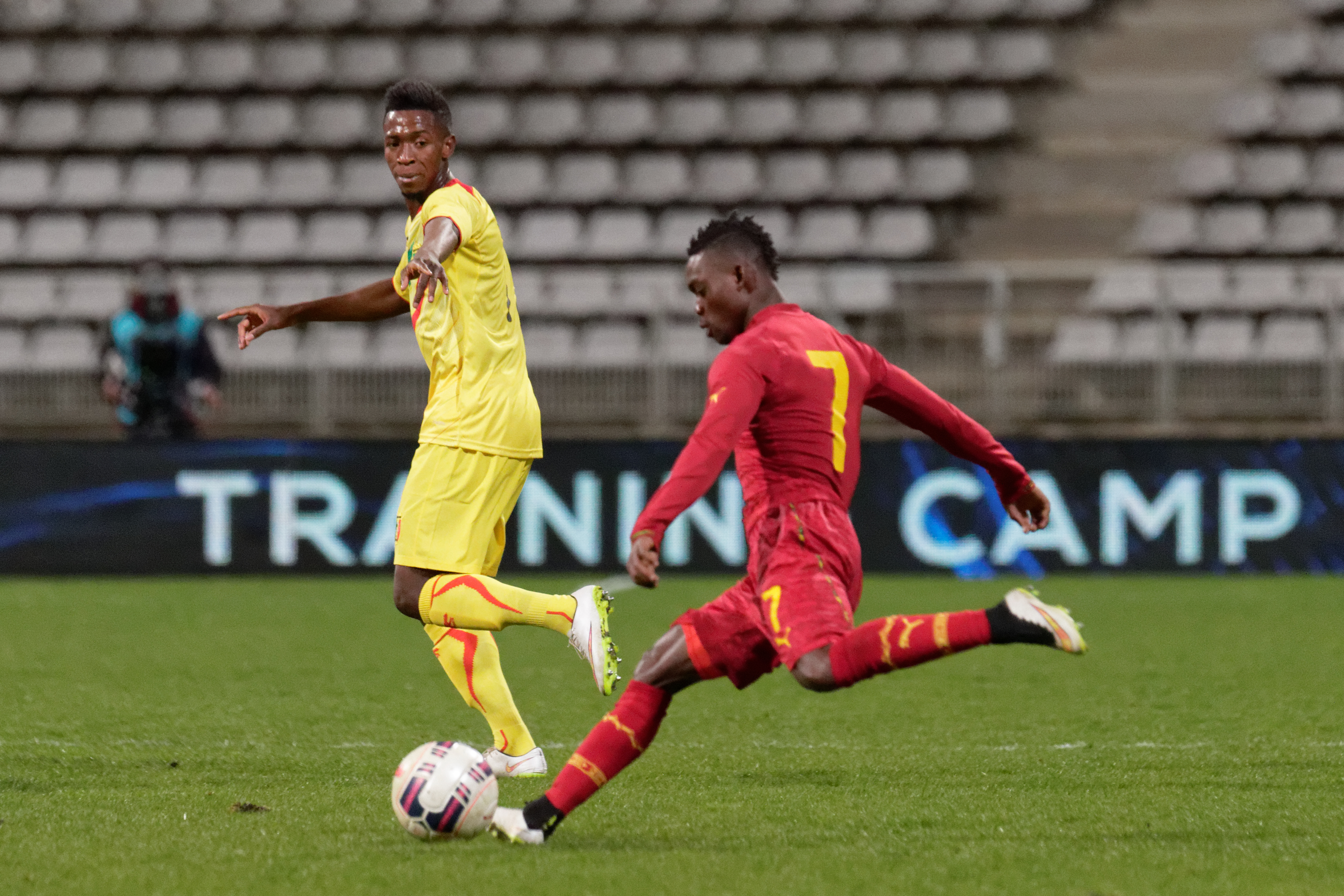
Atsu on the ball in a friendly against Mali 2015

Atsu won his first senior cap for the Ghana national team on 1 June 2012 against Lesotho, scoring in the process. He was described by the BBC as an "excellent prospect", whilst ESPN added he was "quick and technically impressive", and a potential future star for his national team.

The following year, he was in the Ghanaian squad for the 2013 Africa Cup of Nations in South Africa. He started the first match, a 2–2 draw against the DR Congo, and was a substitute in the following 1–0 win over Mali. He returned to the starting line-up in the last group match against Niger in Port Elizabeth, scoring the second goal of a 3–0 win which put his country into the quarter-finals as group winners. Atsu featured in the rest of Ghana's matches as they came fourth, scoring in their penalty shootout elimination by Burkina Faso.

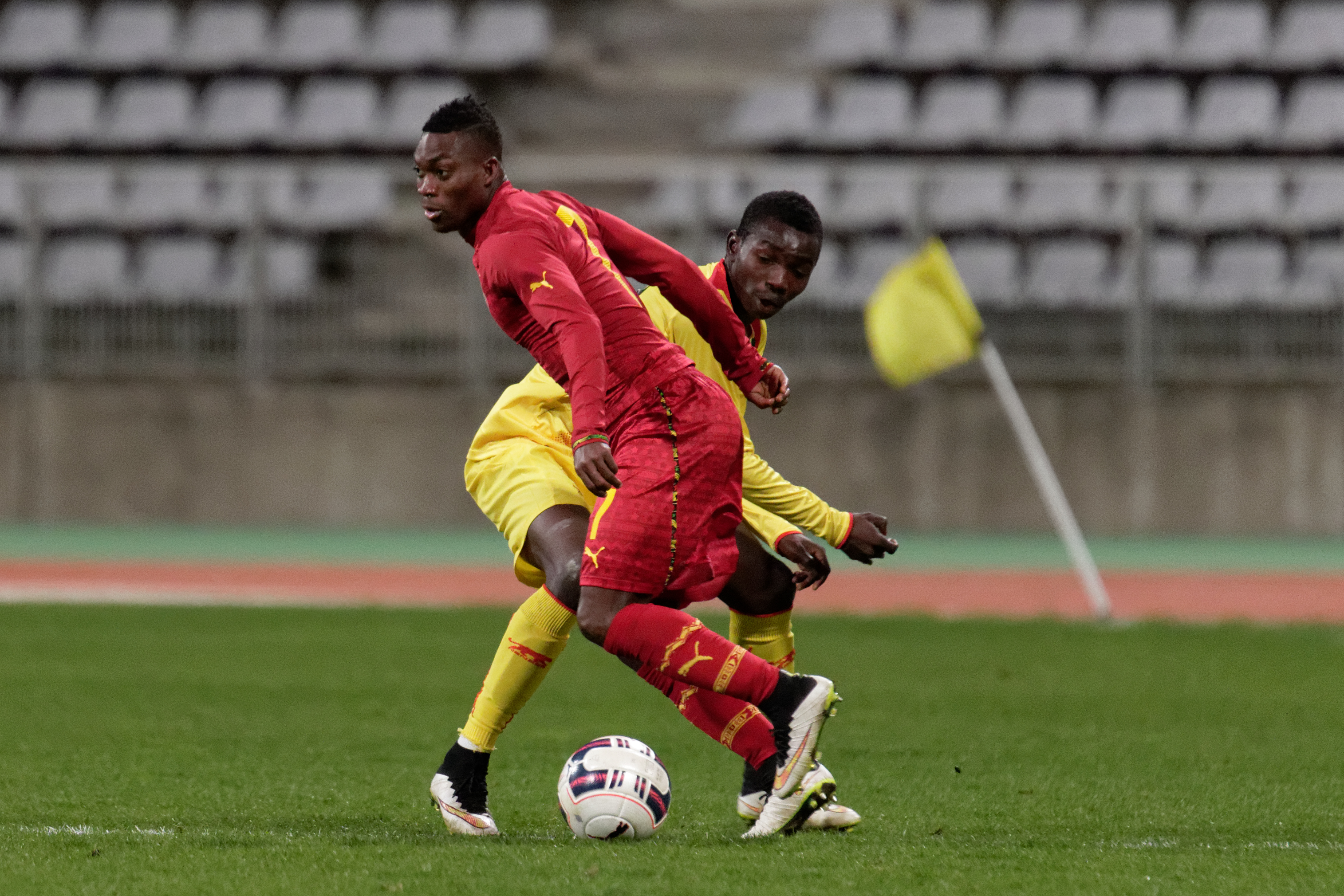
Atsu playing for Ghana in 2015

Atsu was selected for the 2014 FIFA World Cup squad, starting in all the matches as Ghana were eliminated in the group stage.

At the 2015 Africa Cup of Nations, Atsu scored twice in a 3–0 win over Guinea in the quarter-finals. He helped the team to the final, where they lost in a penalty shootout against the Ivory Coast. At the end of the tournament, he was awarded with both the Player of the Tournament award, as well as the Goal of the Tournament award for his strike against Guinea.

Atsu was also named in the Team of the Tournament for the 2017 Africa Cup of Nations in Gabon, where Ghana came fourth. He was called up for the 2019 edition in Egypt.

== Personal life ==
Atsu was a devout Christian who shared Bible verses on social media. He used to attend Hillsong Church Newcastle during his time as a Premier League player. He became a Christian at the age of 16 and had since tried to “imitate the life that Jesus Christ was living”.

Described by The Guardian obituary writer Louise Taylor as "a true Christian in every sense of the word", he was active in charity, being an ambassador for Arms Around the Child, an organisation supporting disadvantaged children; he also paid thousands of pounds of bail money to free Ghanaians who had been jailed for stealing food.

Atsu was married to author Marie-Claire Rupio, with whom he had two sons and a daughter.

== Death and funeral ==
On 6 February 2023, Atsu went missing in the immediate aftermath of the 2023 Turkey–Syria earthquake; he was feared to be among those trapped under the rubble of Hatayspor's headquarters in Antakya following the quake. Atsu had been scheduled to fly out of southern Turkey hours before the quake, but Hatayspor's manager said he stayed with the club after scoring the winning goal in a 5 February match. On 7 February, club vice-president Mustafa Özat said Atsu had been rescued and was recovering in hospital, while on 8 February manager Volkan Demirel said that Atsu and sporting director Taner Savut were still missing. On 14 February, Atsu's agent confirmed two pairs of his shoes had been found, but that Atsu himself had still not been found. On 18 February, confirmation was received by his agent that his body was recovered from the rubble of the building he was residing in. News outlets reported his death at approximately 6 a.m. GMT.

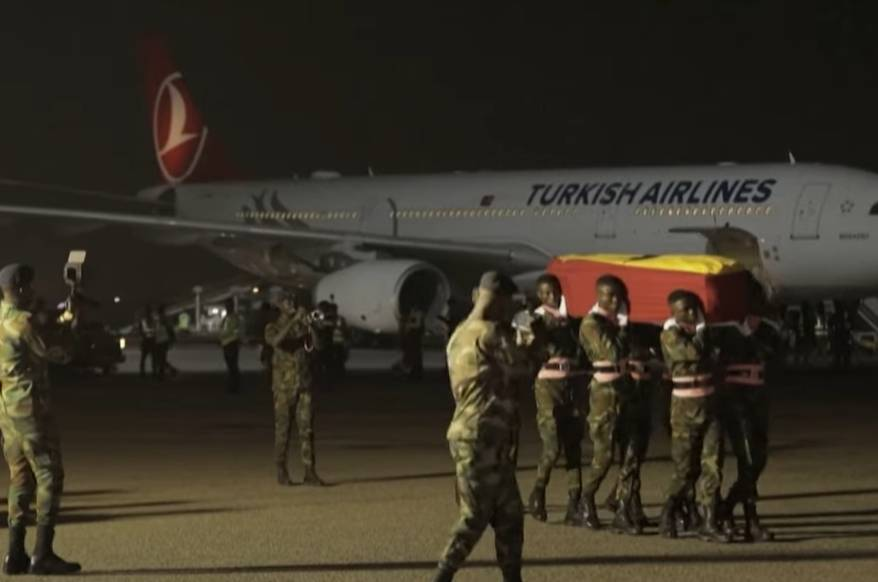
Atsu's funeral procession, 20 February 2023

Atsu's former club Newcastle United paid tribute to him at their game against Liverpool on 18 February. Prior to the start of the game, a minute of applause was held in his honour. Atsu's widow and their children were in attendance. The tribute was also made at other Premier League games that occurred over the weekend. The Premier League's Twitter account tweeted:

We are deeply saddened by the news Christian Atsu lost his life in the devastation of the earthquakes that have hit Turkey and Syria.

Our thoughts and condolences are with Christian's family and friends and everyone affected by this tragic event.

—

His body was flown from Turkey to his family in Ghana on 20 February. Vice President of Ghana Mahamudu Bawumia spoke at his funeral, and a military procession was held in his honour. A one-week observation was made in honour of Christian Atsu on Saturday, 4 March 2023, at the Adjiringanor AstroTurf in Accra, Ghana. On 17 March 2023, Atsu was accorded a state-assisted funeral at the Forecourt of the State House in Accra before being buried in his hometown, Dogobome in Ada Foah.

== Career statistics ==
=== Club ===
Appearances and goals by club, season and competition
Club	Season	League			National cup (Note: Includes Taça de Portugal, KNVB Cup, FA Cup, Turkish Cup)		League cup (Note: Includes Taça da Liga, EFL Cup)		Continental		Total	
Club	Season	Division	Apps	Goals	Apps	Goals	Apps	Goals	Apps	Goals	Apps	Goals
Rio Ave	2011–12	Primeira Liga	27	6	1	0	2	0	—		30	6
Porto	2012–13	Primeira Liga	17	1	3	0	1	0	8 (Note: Appearances in UEFA Champions League)	0	29	1
Vitesse (loan from Chelsea)	2013–14	Eredivisie	28	5	2	0	—		0	0	30	5
Everton (loan from Chelsea)	2014–15	Premier League	5	0	0	0	1	0	7 (Note: Appearances in UEFA Europa League)	0	13	0
Bournemouth (loan from Chelsea)	2015–16	Premier League	0	0	0	0	2	0	—		2	0
Málaga (loan from Chelsea)	2015–16	La Liga	12	2	0	0	—		—		12	2
Newcastle United (loan from Chelsea)	2016–17	Championship	32	5	0	0	3	0	—		35	5
Newcastle United	2017–18	Premier League	28	2	1	0	0	0	—		29	2
Newcastle United	2018–19	Premier League	28	1	3	0	1	0	—		32	1
Newcastle United	2019–20	Premier League	19	0	4	0	1	0	—		24	0
Newcastle United	2020–21	Premier League	0	0	0	0	1	0	—		1	0
Newcastle United	Total		107	8	8	0	6	0	—		121	8
Al-Raed	2021–22	Saudi Pro League	8	0	0	0	—		—		8	0
Hatayspor	2022–23	Süper Lig	3	1	1	0	—		—		4	1
Career total			207	23	15	0	12	0	15	0	249	23

=== International ===
Appearances and goals by national team and year
National team	Year	Apps	Goals
Ghana	2012	7	2
Ghana	2013	13	3
Ghana	2014	11	1
Ghana	2015	12	2
Ghana	2016	6	1
Ghana	2017	8	0
Ghana	2018	2	0
Ghana	2019	6	0
Total		65	9

Scores and results list Ghana's goal tally first, score column indicates score after each Atsu goal. Some sources credit Atsu with scoring a goal against Lesotho on 16 June 2013, but FIFA credited it to John Boye.

List of international goals scored by Christian Atsu
No.	Date	Venue	Opponent	Score	Result	Competition
1	1 June 2012	Baba Yara Stadium, Kumasi, Ghana	Lesotho	5–0	7–0	2014 FIFA World Cup qualification
2	8 September 2012	Accra Sports Stadium, Accra, Ghana	Malawi	1–0	2–0	2013 Africa Cup of Nations qualification
3	28 January 2013	Nelson Mandela Bay Stadium, Port Elizabeth, South Africa	Niger	2–0	3–0	2013 Africa Cup of Nations
4	15 October 2013	Baba Yara Stadium, Kumasi, Ghana	Egypt	6–1	6–1	2014 FIFA World Cup qualification
5	10 September 2014	Stade de Kégué, Lomé, Togo	Togo	3–2	3–2	2015 Africa Cup of Nations qualification
6	1 February 2015	Estadio de Malabo, Malabo, Equatorial Guinea	Guinea	1–0	3–0	2015 Africa Cup of Nations
7	1 February 2015	Estadio de Malabo, Malabo, Equatorial Guinea	Guinea	3–0	3–0	2015 Africa Cup of Nations
8	14 June 2015	Accra Sports Stadium, Accra, Ghana	Mauritius	1–0	7–1	2017 Africa Cup of Nations qualification
9	5 June 2016	Stade Anjalay, Belle Vue Maurel, Mauritius	Mauritius	2–0	2–0	2017 Africa Cup of Nations qualification

== Honours ==
Porto Youth

- Blue Stars/FIFA Youth Cup: 2011

Porto

- Primeira Liga: 2012–13
- Supertaça Cândido de Oliveira: 2012

Newcastle United

- EFL Championship: 2016–17

Ghana

- Africa Cup of Nations runner-up: 2015

Individual

- Blue Stars/FIFA Youth Cup Golden Ball: 2011
- Vitesse Player of the Year: 2013–14
- Africa Cup of Nations Player of the Tournament: 2015
- Africa Cup of Nations Team of the Tournament: 2015, 2017
- Africa Cup of Nations Goal of the Tournament: 2015
- Dragão de Ouro – Young Athlete of the Year: 2011
- Cyrille Regis Players Award: 2018
