= Selimcan Temel =

Welsh association footballer

Personal information
- Date of birth: 27 May 2000 (age 26)
- Place of birth: Bursa, Turkey
- Height: 1.73 m (5 ft 8 in)
- Position: Defensive midfielder

Senior career*
| Years | Team | Apps | (Gls) |
| 2019–2022 | İnegölspor | 78 | (0) |
| 2022–2025 | Hatayspor | 27 | (1) |
| 2023 | → Fethiyespor (loan) | 7 | (0) |
| 2023–2024 | → Karacabey Belediyespor (loan) | 16 | (0) |
| 2024 | → Kırşehir Futbol SK (loan) | 15 | (0) |
| 2026 | Malatya Yeşilyurtspor | 8 | (1) |
- * Club domestic league appearances and goals as of 16 May 2026

Selimcan Temel (born 27 May 2000) is a Turkish professional footballer who plays as a defensive midfielder.

== Career ==
Temel began his senior career with İnegölspor in the TFF First League, playing with them 78 times in the league. He transferred to the Süper Lig club Hatayspor on 19 January 2022. He made his professional debut with Hatayspor in a 2–0 Süper Lig loss to Fenerbahçe on 20 February 2022.

On 13 November 2025, Temel was banned from playing for 45 days for his involvement in the 2025 Turkish football betting scandal.
