= Burak Öksüz =

Turkish footballer

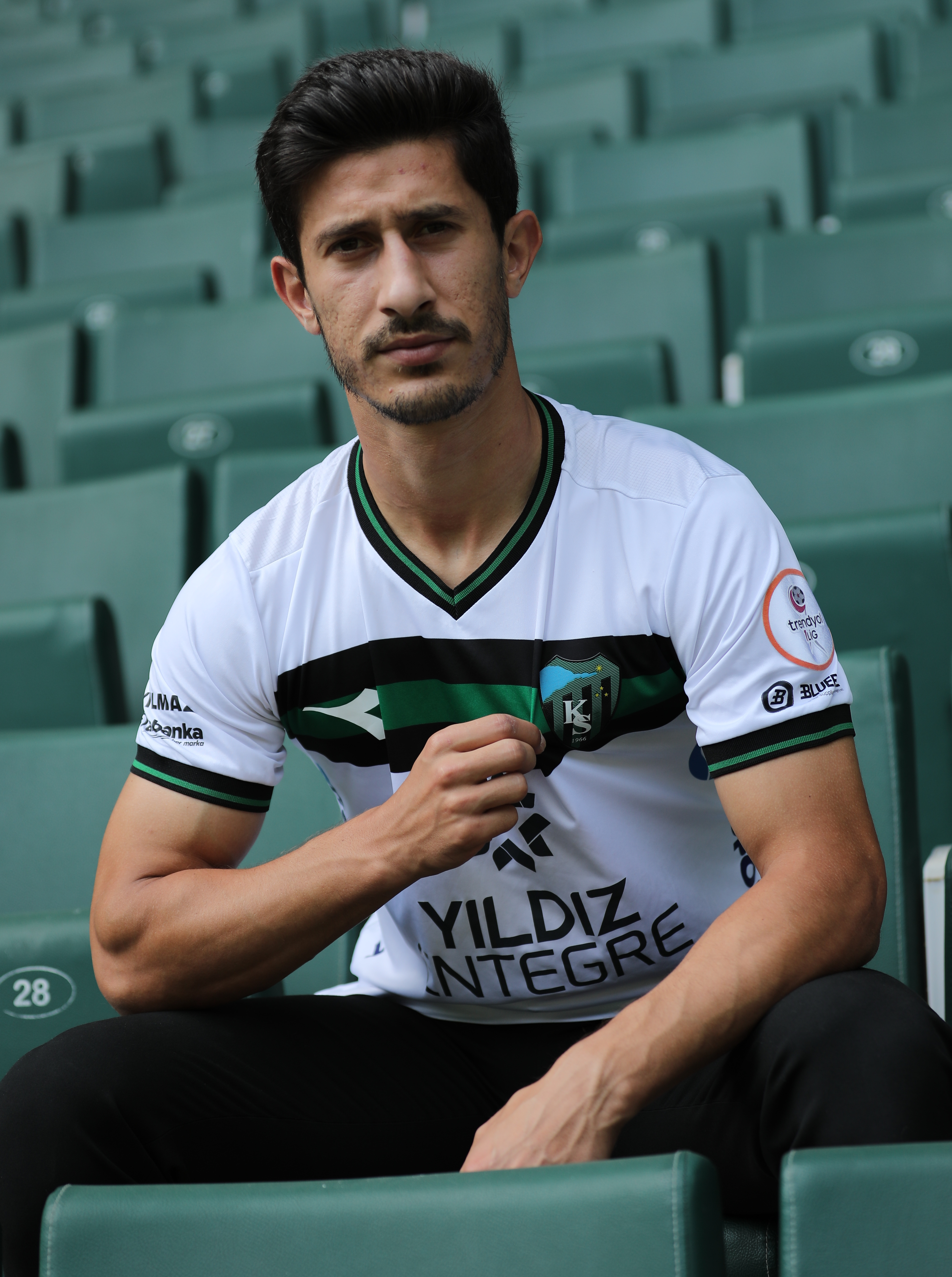

Personal information
- Date of birth: 25 January 1996 (age 30)
- Place of birth: Rize, Turkey
- Height: 1.85 m (6 ft 1 in)
- Position: Centre-back

Team information
- Current team: Ümraniyespor
- Number: 53

Youth career
- 2010–2012: Çaykurspor
- 2012–2014: Ankaraspor
- 2014–2015: Ankaragücü

Senior career*
Years	Team	Apps	(Gls)
2015–2018	Ankara Demirspor	53	(0)
2018–2019	24 Erzincanspor	28	(1)
2019–2020	Ankara Demirspor	25	(3)
2020–2021	Sakaryaspor	37	(3)
2021–2023	Hatayspor	44	(1)
2023	→ Bodrumspor (loan)	4	(0)
2023–2024	Kocaelispor	25	(0)
2024–	Ümraniyespor	47	(3)

International career
2014	Turkey U17	5	(0)
2015	Turkey U18	1	(0)
2014–2015	Turkey U19	8	(0)
- * Club domestic league appearances and goals as of 6 May 2026

Burak Öksüz (born 25 January 1996), is a Turkish professional footballer who plays as a centre-back for Ümraniyespor.

== Professional career ==
A youth product of Çaykurspor, Ankaraspor, and Ankaragücü, Öksüz began his early career with various pro and semi-pro teams in Turkey. On 10 July 2021, he transferred to Hatayspor. He made his professional debut with Hatayspor in a 1–1 Süper Lig tie with Kasımpaşa on 14 August 2021.

On September 14, 2024, he transferred from Kocaelispor to Ümraniyespor.
