= Onur Ergün =

Turkish footballer

Personal information
- Date of birth: 15 November 1992 (age 33)
- Place of birth: Bingöl, Turkey
- Height: 1.85 m (6 ft 1 in)
- Position: Midfielder

Team information
- Current team: İstanbul Başakşehir
- Number: 4

Youth career
- 2003–2005: Karşıyaka Belediyespor
- 2005–2007: Karşıyaka
- 2007–2008: Karşıyaka Belediyespor

Senior career*
Years	Team	Apps	(Gls)
2008–2011	Menemenspor	5	(0)
2011–2012	Çiğli Belediyespor	12	(1)
2012–2013	1928 Bucaspor	23	(4)
2011–2021	İstanbulspor	242	(44)
2021–2023	Hatayspor	44	(2)
2023	→ İstanbulspor (loan)	10	(1)
2023–	İstanbul Başakşehir	55	(0)
- * Club domestic league appearances and goals as of 10 June 2026

Onur Ergün (born 15 November 1992) is a Turkish professional footballer who plays as a midfielder for İstanbul Başakşehir.

== Professional career ==
A youth product of Karşıyaka Belediyespor and Karşıyaka, Ergün began his senior career with Menemenspor in 2008. He had stints with the semi-pro clubs Çiğli Belediyespor and 1928 Bucaspor from 2011 to 2013. In 2013, he transferred to İstanbulspor where he became the captain for 8 years, and helped the team get promoted into the TFF Second League and eventually the TFF First League. After his contract expired, he signed with Hatayspor on 15 July 2021. He made his professional debut with Hatayspor in a 1–1 Süper Lig tie with Kasımpaşa on 14 August 2021.

On 25 August 2023 he signed with İstanbul Başakşehir.
