= Muhammed Mert =

Belgian footballer

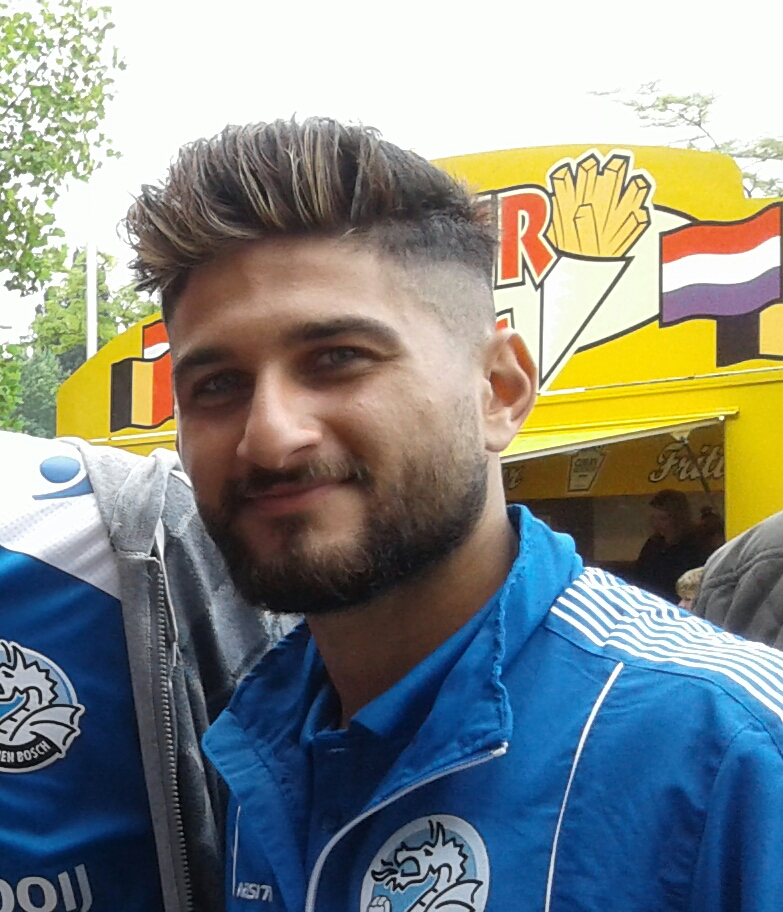
- Mert with FC Den Bosch in 2017

Personal information
- Date of birth: 9 February 1995 (age 31)
- Place of birth: Hasselt, Belgium
- Height: 1.74 m (5 ft 9 in)
- Position: Attacking midfielder

Team information
- Current team: Boluspor
- Number: 21

Youth career
- 2003–2013: Genk

Senior career*
Years	Team	Apps	(Gls)
2013–2014	Genk	0	(0)
2014–2015	NEC Nijmegen	11	(0)
2015–2016	Fortuna Sittard	42	(3)
2017	Víkingur	3	(0)
2017–2018	Den Bosch	11	(2)
2018–2021	Altınordu	69	(7)
2021–2023	Hatayspor	36	(0)
2023	Manisa	10	(1)
2023–2024	Ümraniyespor	29	(2)
2024–2025	Fatih Karagümrük	18	(0)
2025–2026	Sarıyer	10	(0)
2026	İstanbulspor	8	(2)
2026–	Boluspor	10	(0)

International career
2010	Turkey U15	2	(0)
2010	Turkey U16	2	(0)
2011	Belgium U16	3	(0)
2012	Belgium U17	4	(0)
2012	Belgium U18	2	(0)
2013	Belgium U19	1	(0)
- * Club domestic league appearances and goals as of 18 October 2026

Muhammed Mert (born 9 February 1995) is a professional footballer who plays as an attacking midfielder for Turkish TFF 1. Lig club Boluspor. Born in Belgium, he represented both Turkey and Belgium internationally on junior levels.

== Career ==
Mert joined NEC Nijmegen in 2014 from Genk. He made his professional debut on 22 August 2014 against Fortuna Sittard.
