= Taner Savut =

Turkish footballer (1974–2023)

Personal information
- Date of birth: 10 August 1974
- Place of birth: İzmir, Turkey
- Date of death: c. 6 February 2023 (aged 48)
- Place of death: Antakya, Turkey
- Height: 1.76 m (5 ft 9 in)
- Position: Right-back

Senior career*
Years	Team	Apps	(Gls)
1994–1997	İzmirspor		
1997–1999	Fenerbahçe	23	(0)
1999–2000	Göztepe	19	(0)
2000–2002	Siirtspor	29+	(1+)
2002–2004	Sakaryaspor		
2004–2008	Alanyaspor		
2008–2011	Tokatspor		
- * Club domestic league appearances and goals

Taner Savut (10 August 1974 – c. 6 February 2023) was a Turkish sporting director and footballer who played as a right back.

== Playing career ==
Born in İzmir, Savut began his career at hometown club İzmirspor in 1994 before joining Fenerbahçe in 1997. He played his sole European match on 29 September that year as the team lost 2–1 at home to Steaua București in the UEFA Cup first round. In 1999 he moved to fellow Süper Lig team Göztepe and a year later Siirtspor, where he scored his only goal of 71 top-flight appearances, concluding a 3–0 home win over Gençlerbirliği on 6 May 2001. He then played in lower divisions for Sakaryaspor, Alanyaspor and Tokatspor until 2011.

== Administrative career ==
Savut was sporting director at Manisa before joining top-flight Hatayspor in July 2022.

== Death ==
Savut died in the 2023 Turkey–Syria earthquake which struck on 6 February, in the same building collapse that killed Hatayspor player Christian Atsu. He was 48, and his body was found on 21 February.
