= Sadik Baş =

Turkish footballer

Personal information
- Date of birth: 11 May 1994 (age 32)
- Place of birth: Bursa, Turkey
- Height: 1.80 m (5 ft 11 in)
- Position: Winger

Team information
- Current team: Serikspor
- Number: 7

Youth career
- 2005–2008: Hüdavendigar Dikkaldırımspor
- 2008–2009: Makospor
- 2009–2011: Burgazspor
- 2011–2012: Bursa Nilüferspor
- 2012–2013: Mudanyaspor

Senior career*
Years	Team	Apps	(Gls)
2013–2016	Bursa Nilüferspor	87	(7)
2016–2020	Tuzlaspor	128	(24)
2020–2021	Eyüpspor	34	(10)
2021–2023	Hatayspor	24	(0)
2023	→ Bucaspor 1928 (loan)	12	(1)
2023–2024	Tuzlaspor	26	(2)
2024–2026	Kahramanmaraş İstiklalspor	46	(6)
2026–	Serikspor	10	(0)
- * Club domestic league appearances and goals as of 14 November 2026

Sadik Baş (born 11 May 1994) is a Turkish professional footballer who plays as a winger for TFF 2. Lig club Serikspor.

== Professional career ==
Baş is a youth product of the youth academies of Hüdavendigar Dikkaldırımspor, Makospor, Burgazspor, Bursa Nilüferspor and Mudanyaspor. He began his senior career with Bursa Nilüferspor in 2013, and followed that up with stints with Tuzlaspor and Eyüpspor in the TFF Second League. On 3 June 2021, signed his first professional contract with Hatayspor. He made his professional debut with Hatayspor in a 2–1 Süper Lig loss to Galatasaray on 23 August 2021.
