= New Hatay Stadium =

Stadium in Antakya, Turkey

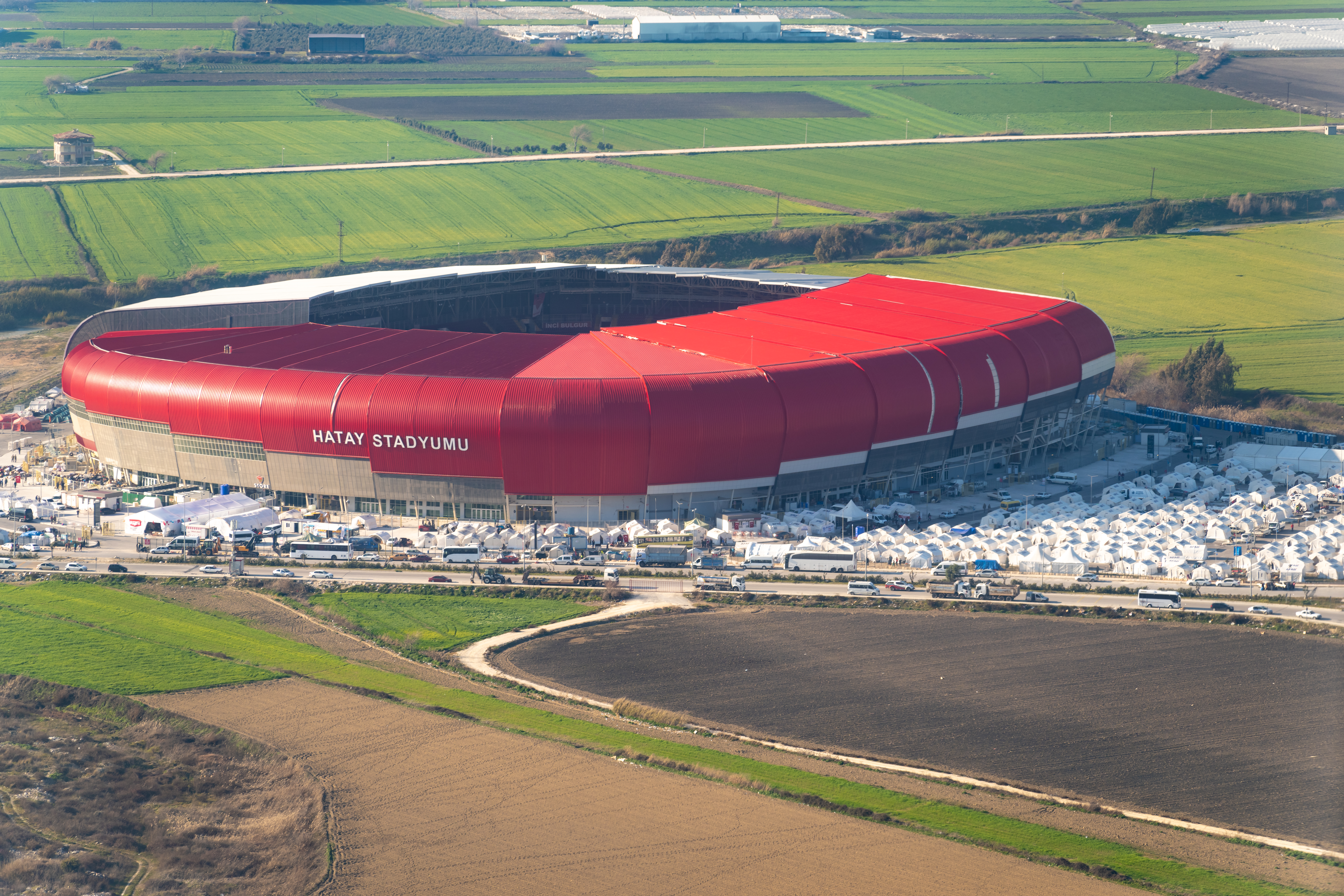
- Interactive map of New Hatay Stadium
- Full name: Yeni Hatay Stadyumu
- Location: Antakya, Turkey
- Coordinates: 36°15′29″N 36°12′28″E
- Owner: General Directorate of Sports Services (SHGM)
- Operator: Hatayspor
- Capacity: 25,000
- Executive suites: 24
- Surface: Grass
- Record attendance: 18,628 (Hatayspor–Beşiktaş, 24 October 2022)

Construction
- Groundbreaking: 1 September 2016
- Built: 2016–2021
- Opened: 25 June 2021
- Cost: ₺129 million
- Architect: Alper Aksoy - Erdem Dokuzer
- General contractors: MD Construction & Sertka Engineering

Tenant
- Hatayspor (2021–present)

The New Hatay Stadium (Turkish: Yeni Hatay Stadyumu) is a stadium in Antakya, Turkey. It was opened to public on 25 June 2021 with a capacity of 25,000 spectators. It is the new home of Hatayspor, currently playing in the Turkish Süper Lig. It has replaced the club's former home, Antakya Atatürk Stadium. On February 6, 2023, the stadium was damaged by the 7.8 and 7.5 earthquakes in Kahramanmaraş and is not in use today. Hatayspor currently plays its matches at Mersin Stadium.
