= Abdullah Yiğiter =

Turkish footballer

Personal information
- Date of birth: 20 February 2000 (age 26)
- Place of birth: Diyarbakır, Turkey
- Height: 1.89 m (6 ft 2 in)
- Position: Goalkeeper

Team information
- Current team: Antalyaspor
- Number: 21

Youth career
- 2012–2014: Diyarbakir DSI Spor
- 2012–2014: Amed

Senior career*
Years	Team	Apps	(Gls)
2015–2016	Amed	0	(0)
2016–2020	Fenerbahçe	0	(0)
2020	İstanbulspor	0	(0)
2020–2021	Amed	29	(0)
2021–2024	Hatayspor	4	(0)
2023	→ Çaykur Rizespor (loan)	1	(0)
2023–2024	→ Kastamonuspor 1966 (loan)	33	(0)
2024–	Antalyaspor	20	(0)
- * Club domestic league appearances and goals as of 10 June 2026

Abdullah Yiğiter (born 20 February 2000) is a Turkish professional footballer who plays as a goalkeeper for Süper Lig club Antalyaspor.

== Professional career ==
A youth product of Diyarbakir DSI Spor and Amed, Yiğiter began his career as the reserve goalkeeper at Amed, Fenerbahçe and İstanbulspor. He returned to Amed SK in 2020, where he was their starter in the TFF Second League. On 30 June 2021, he transferred to the Süper Lig club Hatayspor. He made his professional debut with Hatayspor in a 3–1 Süper Lig loss to Kasımpaşa on 8 January 2022.

== Personal life ==
Abdullah is the son of Murat Yiğiter, who was also a professional football goalkeeper in Turkey.
