= Calvin Sosibo =

Association football player

Personal information
- Full name: Thokozani Calvin Sosibo
- Date of birth: 15 March 1985 (age 41)
- Place of birth: South Africa
- Positions: Midfielder; winger; forward

Senior career*
Years	Team	Apps	(Gls)
- Kaizer Chiefs F.C.
- Maritzburg United F.C.→(loan)
2009/2010	MKE Ankaragücü	3	(0)
2011/2012	Maritzburg United F.C.	4	(0)
- * Club domestic league appearances and goals

Thokozani Calvin Sosibo (born 15 March 1985 in South Africa) is a South African retired footballer.

== Career ==
Sosibo started his career with Kaizer Chiefs, one of the most successful teams in South Africa, before being sent on loan to Maritzburg United.

In 2009, he signed for MKE Ankaragücü in the Turkish top flight, enjoying the passion of the fans there. However, Sosibo was never paid a full salary during his time there.

In 2011, he returned to Maritzburg United before retiring.
